= List of career achievements by Eddy Merckx =

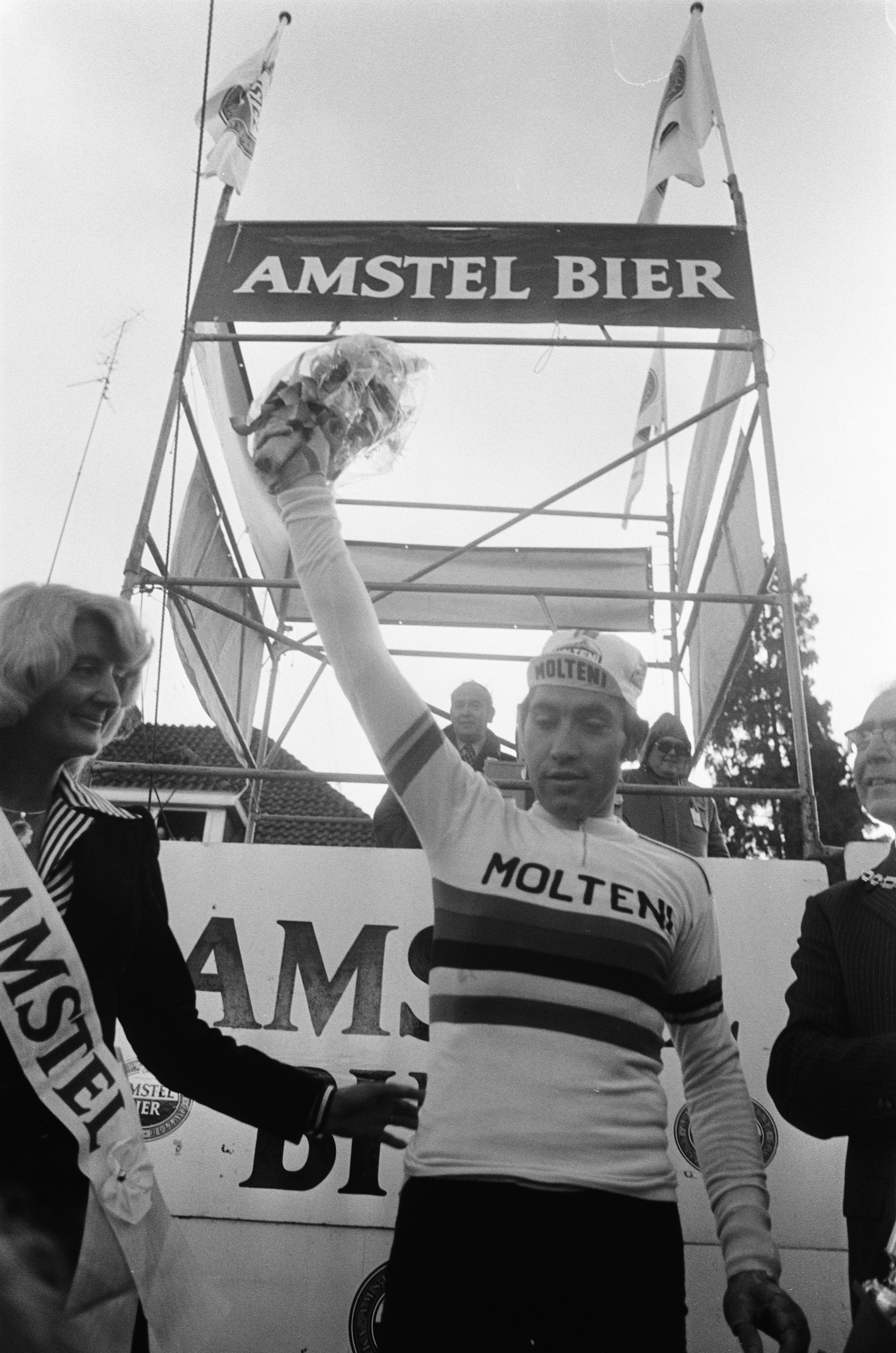
- Merckx after he won the 1975 Amstel Gold Race in the world champion's rainbow jersey.

Cycling career
- Sport: Cycling

Major wins
- Road Grand Tours Tour de France General classification (1969, 1970, 1971, 1972, 1974) Points classification (1969, 1971, 1972) Mountains classification (1969, 1970) Combination classification (1969, 1970, 1971, 1972, 1974) 34 individual stages (1969–1972, 1974, 1975) 6 TTT stages (1969, 1970, 1971, 1972, 1974, 1977) Combativity award (1969, 1970, 1974, 1975) Giro d'Italia General classification (1968, 1970, 1972, 1973, 1974) Points classification (1968, 1973) Mountains classification (1968) Combination classification (1972, 1973) 24 individual stages (1967–1970, 1972, 1973, 1974) 1 TTT stage (1973) Vuelta a España General classification (1973) Points classification (1973) Combination classification (1973) 6 individual stages (1973) 1 TTT stage (1973) Stage races Giro di Sardegna (1968, 1971, 1973, 1975) Tour de Romandie (1968) Volta a Catalunya (1968) Paris–Nice (1969, 1970, 1971) Critérium du Dauphiné Libéré (1971) Grand Prix du Midi Libre (1971) Tour de Suisse (1974) One-day races and Classics World Road Race Championships (1967, 1971, 1974) National Road Race Championships (1970) Milan–San Remo (1966, 1967, 1969, 1971, 1972, 1975, 1976) Paris–Roubaix (1968, 1970, 1973) Tour of Flanders (1969, 1975) Liège–Bastogne–Liège (1969, 1971, 1972, 1973, 1975) Giro di Lombardia (1971, 1972) La Flèche Wallonne (1967, 1970, 1972) Gent–Wevelgem (1967, 1970, 1973) Omloop Het Volk (1971, 1973) Amstel Gold Race (1973, 1975) Other Super Prestige Pernod International (1969, 1970, 1971, 1972, 1973, 1974, 1975) Hour Record (1972) Track European Championships Madison (1970, 1977) Omnium (1975) National Championships Madison (1966, 1967, 1968, 1974, 1975, 1976)
Medal record
Representing Belgium
Men's road bicycle racing
World Championships
| Gold medal – first place | 1964 Sallanches | Amateur Road Race |
| Gold medal – first place | 1967 Heerlen | Elite Road Race |
| Gold medal – first place | 1971 Mendrisio | Elite Road Race |
| Gold medal – first place | 1974 Montréal | Elite Road Race |
Men's track cycling
European Championships
| Gold medal – first place | 1970 Köln | Madison |
| Gold medal – first place | 1975 Grenoble | Omnium |
| Gold medal – first place | 1977 Kopenhagen | Madison |
| Silver medal – second place | 1968 Gent | Omnium |
| Silver medal – second place | 1970 Gent | Omnium |

Eddy Merckx is widely considered to be the greatest bicycle racer in history. His eleven Grand Tour victories are the most ever, and he also won a record of 28 classic cycle races, in addition to a prolific career as an amateur and on the track.

== Career achievements ==
=== Major results ===
Source:

=== Road ===
1961 (Debutant)
1st Petit-Enghien

1962
1st Road race, National Junior Championships
1st Overall Liège-La Gleize

1963 (Amateur)
1st Overall Ronde van Limburg Amateurs
1st Rund um Sebnitz
1st Kampioenschap van Brabant (TTT)

1964
1st Road race, UCI Amateur World Championships
1st Brussels-Opwijk
1st GP Affligem

1965 (Solo-Supéria)
1st GP Stad Vilvoorde
1st Omloop van het Houtland Torhout
2nd Road race, National Championships
2nd Grote Prijs Jef Scherens
2nd Manx Trophy
8th GP du Tournaisis
10th Scheldeprijs

1966 (Team Peugeot–BP)
1st Overall Circuit du Morbihan

1st Stages 3 & 4

1st Overall Escalada a Montjuïc

1st Stage 1a

1st Milan–San Remo
1st Kampioenschap van Vlaanderen
1st Circuit de l'Aulne
1st Circuit des Frontières
1st Druivenkoers Overijse
1st Bruxelles–Meulebeke
1st Grand Prix Pino Cerami
1st Trofeo Baracchi (with Ferdinand Bracke)
1st Stage 2 Grand Prix du Midi Libre
2nd Giro di Lombardia
2nd Coppa Agostoni
3rd Omloop Het Volk
3rd Grand Prix des Nations
4th Overall Paris–Nice
4th Dwars door België
4th Gran Premio di Lugano
6th Critérium des As
8th Liège–Bastogne–Liège
9th Gent–Wevelgem

1967 (Team Peugeot–BP)
1st Road race, UCI World Championships
1st Milan–San Remo
1st La Flèche Wallonne
1st Gent–Wevelgem
1st Nationale Sluitingsprijs
1st GP du Tournaisis
1st Critérium des As
1st Omloop der Zennevallei
1st Tour du Condroz
1st Trofeo Baracchi (with Ferdinand Bracke)
Giro di Sardegna

1st Stages 6 & 7

2nd Liège–Bastogne–Liège
2nd À travers Lausanne
3rd Tour of Flanders
4th GP Union Dortmund
6th Overall Paris–Luxembourg

1st Stage 3

6th Giro di Lombardia
7th Rund um den Henninger Turm
8th Paris–Roubaix
8th Harelbeke–Antwerp–Harelbeke
9th Overall Giro d'Italia

1st Stages 12 & 14

10th Overall Paris–Nice

1st Stages 2 & 6

1968 (Team Faema)
1st Overall Giro d'Italia

1st Points classification
1st Mountains classification
1st Stages 1, 2, 8, & 12

1st Overall Tour de Romandie

1st Stage 1b

1st Overall Volta a Catalunya

1st Stages 2 & 6b (ITT)

1st Overall Giro di Sardegna

1st Stages 1 & 5b

1st Overall À travers Lausanne

1st Stages 1 (ITT) & 2 (ITT)

1st Paris–Roubaix
1st Tre Valli Varesine
1st Gran Premio di Lugano
1st Stage 2 Tour of Belgium
1st Stage 3 (ITT) Setmana Catalana de Ciclisme
1st Stage 4a (TTT) Paris–Nice
2nd Omloop der Zennevallei
3rd Giro di Lombardia
3rd Sassari-Cagliari
5th Nationale Sluitingsprijs
6th Grand Prix Flandria
7th Overall Paris–Luxembourg

1st Stage 3 (TTT)

8th Road race, UCI World Championships
8th Tour of Flanders
8th Paris–Tours
8th Brabantse Pijl
9th Gent–Wevelgem

1969 (Team Faema)
1st Overall Tour de France

1st Points classification
1st Mountains classification
1st Combination classification
1st Stages 1b (TTT), 6, 8a (ITT), 11, 15 (ITT), 17 & 22b (ITT)
Combativity award Overall

1st Overall Paris–Nice

1st Stages 2, 3b (ITT) & 7b (ITT)

1st Overall Vuelta a Levante

1st Points classification
1st Stages 3, 4 & 5

1st Overall Paris–Luxembourg

1st Stage 2

1st Milan–San Remo
1st Tour of Flanders
1st Liège–Bastogne–Liège
1st Circuit de l'Aulne
1st Bruxelles–Meulebeke
Giro d'Italia

1st Stages 3, 4 (ITT), 7 & 15 (ITT)
Held after Stages 9–11 & 14–16
Held after Stages 4–13, 15 & 16

1st Stage 3 Vuelta a Mallorca
2nd Paris–Roubaix
2nd Trofeo Laigueglia
3rd Amstel Gold Race
3rd Trofeo Baracchi (with Davide Boifava)
4th Züri–Metzgete
5th La Flèche Wallonne
6th Overall À travers Lausanne
7th Harelbeke–Antwerp–Harelbeke

1970 (Team Faema–Faemino)
1st Road race, National Championships
1st Overall Tour de France

1st Mountains classification
1st Combination classification
1st Prologue, Stages 3 (TTT), 7a, 10, 11a (ITT), 12, 14, 20b (ITT) & 23 (ITT)
Held after Prologue & Stages 14, 15 & 18
Combativity award Overall

1st Overall Giro d'Italia

1st Stages 2, 7 & 9 (ITT)

1st Overall Paris–Nice

1st Points classification
1st Mountains classification
1st Stages 3, 7b & 8b (ITT)

1st Overall Tour of Belgium

1st Points classification
1st Stages 1b (ITT) & 3b (ITT)

1st Overall Escalada a Montjuïc

1st Mountains classification
1st Stage 1b (ITT)

1st Overall À travers Lausanne

1st Stages 1 (ITT) & 2 (ITT)

1st Paris–Roubaix
1st La Flèche Wallonne
1st Gent–Wevelgem
1st GP Union Dortmund
1st Coppa Agostoni
1st Critérium des As
2nd Overall Giro di Sardegna

1st Stages 2 & 5a (ITT)

2nd Tre Valli Varesine
3rd Tour of Flanders
3rd Liège–Bastogne–Liège
3rd Circuit de l'Aulne
4th Giro di Lombardia
4th Tour du Condroz
5th Polymultipliée
6th Giro del Lazio
6th Mont Faron Hill Climb
7th Omloop Het Volk
7th Giro dell'Emilia
7th Kampioenschap van Vlaanderen
8th Milan–San Remo
8th Amstel Gold Race
8th Rund um den Henninger Turm

1971 (Team Molteni)
1st Road race, UCI World Championships
1st Overall Tour de France

1st Points classification
1st Combination classification
1st Prologue (TTT), Stages 2, 13 (ITT), 17 & 20 (ITT)

1st Overall Critérium du Dauphiné Libéré

1st Prologue (TTT) & Stage 5b (ITT)

1st Overall Paris–Nice

1st Prologue, Stages 2b (ITT) & 7b (ITT)

1st Overall Grand Prix du Midi Libre

1st Stages 1 & 2

1st Overall Giro di Sardegna

1st Stages 1, 3a & 5

1st Overall Tour of Belgium

1st Points classification
1st Stages 1 (ITT), 2 & 4

1st Overall Escalada a Montjuïc

1st Stages 1 & 2

1st Milan–San Remo
1st Liège–Bastogne–Liège
1st Giro di Lombardia
1st Omloop Het Volk
1st Rund um den Henninger Turm
1st Gran Premio Città di Camaiore
1st Stadsprijs Geraardsbergen
1st Baden-Baden (with Herman Vanspringel)
2nd Overall À travers Lausanne
2nd Brabantse Pijl
2nd Grand Prix de Monaco
3rd E3 Prijs Vlaanderen
3rd GP Union Dortmund
4th Trofeo Laigueglia
4th Nationale Sluitingsprijs
5th Road race, National Championships
5th Paris–Roubaix
5th Giro dell'Emilia
7th Coppa Bernocchi
8th Kampioenschap van Vlaanderen

1972 (Team Molteni)
1st Overall Tour de France

1st Points classification
1st Combination classification
1st Prologue, Stages 3b (TTT), 5b (ITT), 8, 13, 14a & 20a (ITT)

1st Overall Giro d'Italia

1st Combination classification
1st Stages 12a (ITT), 14, 16 & 19b (ITT)
Held after Stages 12b, 14, 16 & 17

1st Overall Escalada a Montjuïc

1st Stages 1a (ITT), 1b & 1c (ITT)

1st Overall À travers Lausanne

1st Stages 1 & 2 (ITT)

1st Milan–San Remo
1st Liège–Bastogne–Liège
1st Giro di Lombardia
1st La Flèche Wallonne
1st Scheldeprijs
1st Brabantse Pijl
1st Giro dell'Emilia
1st Giro del Piemonte
1st GP Union Dortmund
1st Grand Prix de Momignies
1st Trofeo Baracchi (with Roger Swerts)
2nd Road race, National Championships
2nd Overall Paris–Nice

1st Prologue, Stages 2 & 5

2nd E3 Prijs Vlaanderen
2nd Rund um den Henninger Turm
2nd Kampioenschap van Vlaanderen
2nd Nationale Sluitingsprijs
3rd Gent–Wevelgem
3rd Omloop Het Volk
3rd Trofeo Laigueglia
3rd Circuit de l'Aulne
4th Road race, UCI World Championships
7th Paris–Roubaix
7th Tour of Flanders
8th Tour du Condroz

1973 (Team Molteni)
1st Overall Giro d'Italia

1st Points classification
1st Combination classification
1st Prologue (TTT), Stages 1, 4, 8, 10 & 18
Held after Stages 6–18

1st Overall Vuelta a España

1st Points classification
1st Combination classification
1st Sprints classification
1st Prologue, Stages 6b (TTT), 8, 10, 15b (ITT), 16 & 17b (ITT)

1st Overall Giro di Sardegna

1st Stage 4a (ITT)

1st Overall Grand Prix de Fourmies

1st Stage 1

1st Overall À travers Lausanne

1st Stages 1 & 2 (ITT)

1st Paris–Roubaix
1st Liège–Bastogne–Liège
1st Gent–Wevelgem
1st Amstel Gold Race
1st Omloop Het Volk
1st Trofeo Laigueglia
1st Paris–Brussels
1st Ronde van Oost-Vlaanderen
1st Grand Prix des Nations
2nd Road race, National Championships
2nd Overall Setmana Catalana de Ciclisme
2nd La Flèche Wallonne
3rd Overall Paris–Nice

1st Stage 1 (ITT)

3rd Tour of Flanders
3rd GP Union Dortmund
3rd Critérium des As
4th Road race, UCI World Championships
4th Milano–Torino
6th Paris–Tours
9th Scheldeprijs

1974 (Team Molteni)
1st Road race, UCI World Championships
1st Overall Tour de France

1st Combination classification
1st Prologue, Stages 6b (TTT), 7, 9, 10, 15, 19b (ITT), 21a & 22
Held after Prologue
Combativity award Overall

1st Overall Giro d'Italia

1st Stages 12 (ITT) & 21

1st Overall Tour de Suisse

1st Points classification
1st Mountains classification
1st Prologue, Stages 2 & 9b (ITT)

1st Overall Escalada a Montjuïc

1st Stages 1a (ITT), 1b & 1c (ITT)

1st Trofeo Laigueglia
1st Grand Prix de Momignies
1st Critérium des As
2nd Overall Setmana Catalana de Ciclisme

1st Points classification
1st Mountains classification

2nd Giro di Lombardia
2nd Gent–Wevelgem
2nd Rund um den Henninger Turm
3rd Overall Paris–Nice

1st Prologue, Stages 1 & 5

3rd Tour of Flanders
3rd Coppa Placci
3rd Trofeo Baracchi (with Roger De Vlaeminck)
4th Overall Giro di Sardegna
4th Overall Four Days of Dunkirk
4th Overall À travers Lausanne
5th Coppa Agostoni
6th Omloop Het Volk
6th Circuit de l'Aulne
9th GP Union Dortmund

1975 (Team Molteni)
1st Overall Giro di Sardegna

1st Stage 2

1st Overall Setmana Catalana de Ciclisme

1st Points classification
1st Stage 3b (ITT)

1st Overall Escalada a Montjuïc

1st Stages 1a & 1c (ITT)

1st Milan–San Remo
1st Tour of Flanders
1st Liège–Bastogne–Liège
1st Amstel Gold Race
1st Circuit de l'Aulne
1st Druivenkoers Overijse
1st Sassari-Cagliari
Tour de Romandie

1st Points classification
1st Stages 1 & 5b (ITT)

2nd Overall Tour de France

1st Stages 6 (ITT) & 9b (ITT)
Held after Stages 6–14
Held after Stage 1a
Combativity award Overall

2nd Overall Paris–Nice

1st Prologue & Stage 5

2nd Overall Tour de Suisse

1st Stage 8

2nd Overall À travers Lausanne
2nd Paris–Roubaix
2nd Züri–Metzgete
2nd Paris–Brussels
2nd Grand Prix de Wallonie
3rd Road race, National Championships
3rd La Flèche Wallonne
3rd Grote Prijs Jef Scherens
4th Critérium des As
5th Coppa Agostoni
5th GP Union Dortmund
6th Giro di Lombardia
6th Gent–Wevelgem
6th Omloop Het Volk
7th Rund um den Henninger Turm
8th Road race, UCI World Championships
9th Paris–Tours
10th Overall Critérium du Dauphiné Libéré

1976 (Team Molteni)
1st Overall Setmana Catalana de Ciclisme

1st Stages 1a (ITT) & 4b (ITT)

1st Milan–San Remo
1st Omloop Leiedal
1st Omloop van de Westhoek
1st Ronde van West-Vlaanderen
2nd Overall Tirreno–Adriatico

1st Mountains classification
1st Stage 2

2nd Brabantse Pijl
2nd Herinneringsprijs Dokter Tistaert – Prijs Groot-Zottegem
2nd Critérium des As
3rd Overall Tour de Romandie

1st Prologue (TTT)

3rd Giro del Lazio
3rd Circuit de l'Aulne
4th La Flèche Wallonne
5th Road race, UCI World Championships
6th Paris–Roubaix
6th Liège–Bastogne–Liège
6th Tre Valli Varesine
7th Züri–Metzgete
7th Rund um den Henninger Turm
7th Grand Prix de Wallonie
8th Overall Giro d'Italia
8th Overall Giro di Sardegna
10th Gent–Wevelgem

1977 (Team Fiat)
1st Overall Tour Méditerranéen
1st Tour du Condroz
1st Stage 5 Paris–Nice
1st Stage 6 Tour de Suisse
2nd Circuit de l'Aulne
2nd Grand Prix d'Isbergues
4th Züri–Metzgete
5th Overall Setmana Catalana de Ciclisme
5th Omloop Het Volk
6th Overall Tour de France

1st Stage 7b (TTT)

6th Liège–Bastogne–Liège
7th Overall Tour de Romandie
8th Overall Critérium du Dauphiné Libéré
~~8th La Flèche Wallonne~~
9th Amstel Gold Race
1978
5th Tour du Haut Var

==== General classification results timeline ====
Grand Tour general classification results
| Grand Tour | 1966 | 1967 | 1968 | 1969 | 1970 | 1971 | 1972 | 1973 | 1974 | 1975 | 1976 | 1977 |
| Vuelta a España | — | — | — | — | — | — | — | 1 | — | — | — | — |
| Giro d'Italia | — | 9 | 1 | DNF | 1 | — | 1 | 1 | 1 | — | 8 | — |
| Tour de France | — | — | — | 1 | 1 | 1 | 1 | — | 1 | 2 | — | 6 |
Major stage race general classification results
| Major stage race | 1966 | 1967 | 1968 | 1969 | 1970 | 1971 | 1972 | 1973 | 1974 | 1975 | 1976 | 1977 |
| Giro di Sardegna | — | 28 | 1 | — | 2 | 1 | 33 | 1 | 4 | 1 | 8 | 20 |
| Paris–Nice | 4 | 10 | DNF | 1 | 1 | 1 | 2 | 3 | 3 | 2 | — | DNF |
| Tirreno–Adriatico | — | — | — | — | — | — | — | — | — | — | 2 | — |
| Tour of Belgium | 11 | — | DNF | — | 1 | 1 | — | ? | — | — | 26 | — |
| Grand Prix du Midi Libre | 11 | — | — | — | — | 1 | — | — | — | — | 3 | 7 |
| Tour of the Basque Country | Not held | | | — | — | — | — | — | — | — | — | — |
| Tour de Romandie | — | — | 1 | — | — | — | — | — | — | 14 | 3 | 7 |
| Critérium du Dauphiné Libéré | — | Not held | | — | — | 1 | — | — | — | 10 | — | 8 |
| Tour de Suisse | — | — | — | — | — | — | — | — | 1 | 2 | — | 12 |
| Volta a Catalunya | — | — | 1 | — | — | — | — | — | — | — | — | — |

==== Classics results timeline ====
| Monument | 1965 | 1966 | 1967 | 1968 | 1969 | 1970 | 1971 | 1972 | 1973 | 1974 | 1975 | 1976 | 1977 |
|---|---|---|---|---|---|---|---|---|---|---|---|---|---|
| Milan–San Remo | — | 1 | 1 | 31 | 1 | 8 | 1 | 1 | — | — | 1 | 1 | 98 |
| Tour of Flanders | — | DNF | 3 | 9 | 1 | 3 | 76 | 7 | 3 | 3 | 1 | 17 | DNF |
| Paris–Roubaix | — | 15 | 8 | 1 | 2 | 1 | 5 | 7 | 1 | 4 | 2 | 6 | 11 |
| Liège–Bastogne–Liège | — | 8 | 2 | — | 1 | 3 | 1 | 1 | 1 | — | 1 | 6 | 6 |
| Giro di Lombardia | — | 2 | 7 | 3 | — | 4 | 1 | 1 | DSQ | 2 | 6 | — | — |
| Classic | 1965 | 1966 | 1967 | 1968 | 1969 | 1970 | 1971 | 1972 | 1973 | 1974 | 1975 | 1976 | 1977 |
| Omloop Het Volk | — | 3 | — | — | 12 | 7 | 1 | 3 | 1 | 6 | 6 | 15 | 5 |
| Brabantse Pijl | — | — | — | 8 | — | — | 2 | 1 | — | — | 18 | 2 | — |
| E3 Prijs Vlaanderen | — | — | 8 | 17 | 7 | — | 3 | 2 | 14 | — | — | — | — |
| Amstel Gold Race | NH | — | 16 | — | 3 | 8 | — | — | 1 | — | 1 | — | 9 |
| Gent–Wevelgem | — | 9 | 1 | 9 | — | 1 | 14 | 3 | 1 | 2 | 6 | 10 | — |
| La Flèche Wallonne | DNF | DNF | 1 | — | 5 | 1 | — | 1 | 2 | — | 3 | 4 | DSQ |
| Paris–Brussels | — | 20 | Not held | | | | | | 1 | — | 2 | — | — |
| Paris–Tours | — | 20 | — | 8 | — | — | — | 115 | 6 | — | 9 | — | 38 |

==== Major championships results timeline ====
| | 1965 | 1966 | 1967 | 1968 | 1969 | 1970 | 1971 | 1972 | 1973 | 1974 | 1975 | 1976 | 1977 |
|---|---|---|---|---|---|---|---|---|---|---|---|---|---|
| World Championships | 29 | 12 | 1 | 8 | DNF | 29 | 1 | 4 | 4 | 1 | 8 | 5 | 33 |
| National Championships | 2 | 15 | — | 11 | 31 | 1 | 5 | 2 | 2 | — | 3 | — | 9 |

Legend
| — | Did not compete |
| NH | Not Held |
| DNF | Did not finish |
| DSQ | Disqualified |

==== Grand Tour record ====
| | 1965 | 1966 | 1967 | 1968 | 1969 | 1970 | 1971 | 1972 | 1973 | 1974 | 1975 | 1976 | 1977 |
| Vuelta a España | DNE | DNE | DNE | DNE | DNE | DNE | DNE | DNE | 1 | DNE | DNE | DNE | DNE |
| Stages won | — | — | — | — | — | — | — | — | 6 | — | — | — | — |
| Mountains classification | — | — | — | — | — | — | — | — | 2 | — | — | — | — |
| Points classification | — | — | — | — | — | — | — | — | 1 | — | — | — | — |
| Giro d'Italia | DNE | DNE | 9 | 1 | DSQ | 1 | DNE | 1 | 1 | 1 | DNE | 8 | DNE |
| Stages won | — | — | 2 | 3 | 4 | 3 | — | 4 | 6 | 2 | — | 0 | — |
| Mountains classification | — | — | 3 | 1 | DSQ | 4 | — | 2 | 2 | 2 | — | 7 | — |
| Points classification | — | — | 2 | 1 | DSQ | 3 | — | 2 | 1 | 4 | — | 2 | — |
| Tour de France | DNE | DNE | DNE | DNE | 1 | 1 | 1 | 1 | DNE | 1 | 2 | DNE | 6 |
| Stages won | — | — | — | — | 6 | 8 | 4 | 6 | — | 8 | 2 | — | 0 |
| Mountains classification | — | — | — | — | 1 | 1 | 3 | 2 | — | 2 | 2 | — | 11 |
| Points classification | — | — | — | — | 1 | 2 | 1 | 1 | — | 2 | 2 | — | 5 |

Legend
| 1 | Winner |
| 2–3 | Top three-finish |
| 4–10 | Top ten-finish |
| 11– | Other finish |
| DNE | Did not enter |
| DNF-x | Did not finish (retired on stage x) |
| DNS-x | Did not start (not started on stage x) |
| HD-x | Finished outside time limit (occurred on stage x) |
| DSQ | Disqualified |
| N/A | Race/classification not held |
| NR | Not ranked in this classification |

=== Criterium ===
1965
1st Trofee Luc Van Biesen
1st GP Itterbeek
1st Wezembeek-Oppem
1st Kessel-Lo
1st Critérium du Renaix
1st Nederbrakel
1st Critérium de Visé
1st Critérium de St. Jansteen
1966
1st Geraardsbergen-Viane
1st Helchteren
1st Rousiès
1st Denderleeuw
1st Rumes
1st GP Le Télégramme à Châteaulin
1st Criterium de Puteaux
1967
1st Critérium de Camors
1st GP Salvarani
1st GP du Tournaisis
1st Nandrin
1st Simpelveld
1st Enter
1st Liedekerkse Pijl
1st La Clayette
1st Critérium de La Panne
1st Critérium de St. Lenaarts
1st Kampioenschap van Brabant
1st Critérium de Liedekerke
1st Critérium d'Armentières
1st Putte-Kapellen
1968
1st Rombano Lombardo
1st Salsiomaggiore
1st La Clayette
1st Bornem
1st Woluwé-St Lambert
1st La Panne
1st Ohain
1st Alsemberg
1st GP Malderen
1st Kampioenschap van Brabant
1st Roue d'Or
1st Trofeo Dicen
1969
1st Ronde du Carnaval d'Aix-en-Provence
1st La Roche-sur-Yon (with R. Lelangue & F. Mintjens)
1st La Trimouille
1st Ottignies
1st Critérium d'Alost
1st Critérium de Woluwé-St Lambert
1st Vincennes omnium
1st Guerlesquin Tro-Ker
1st Remiremont
1st Chateau-Chinon
1st Londerzeel Critérium
1st Saussignac
1st Moorslede Critérium
1st Auvelais Critérium
1st Schaerbeek
1st Alès
1st Circuit de l'Aulne a Châteaulin
1st Scorze
1st G. P. de Wallonie a Charleroi individuelle
1st Coupe du Monde intermarques
1970
1st Sanary
1st Col San Martino
1st Lorient
1st Villafranca
1st Caen
1st Critérium de Renxaix
Critérium de Woluwé-St Lambert

1st Overall
1st Time Trial

1st Ronde de Seignelay
1st Vailly-sur-Sauldre
1st Saint-Cyprien Critérium
1st Bilzen Critérium
1st St. Niklaas Critérium
1st Baussières
1st Varilhes
1st Castelfranco
1st Chateaugiron
1st Bastia
1971
1st Badia a Settimo
1st Ghedi
1st Trofeo Montorsi
1st Cordenons
1972
1st Challenge Gan
1st Castelfranco
1973
1st Challenge Gan
1st Monsummano
1st Pavullo
1st Nandrin
1974
1st GP Malderen
1st Challenge Gan
1975
1st Critérium Professionnel de Châteauroux

=== Track ===
1963
1st Madison, National Amateur Championships (with Patrick Sercu)
1964
1st Madison, National Amateur Championships (with Patrick Sercu)
1965
1st Madison, National Amateur Championships (with Patrick Sercu)
1st Six Days of Ghent (with Patrick Sercu)
1st Rocourt Madison
1966
1st Madison, National Championships (with Patrick Sercu)
1st Roubaix Omnium
1st Brussels Omnium (with Rik Van Looy and Edward Sels)
1st Antwerpen individual
1967
1st Madison, National Championships (with Patrick Sercu)
1st Six Days of Ghent (with Patrick Sercu)
1st Gent Omnium (with Edward Sels & Rik Van Looy)
1st Aulnay-sous-Blois omnium (with Ferdinand Bracke)
1st Milan Omnium
1st Ostende Madison (with Patrick Sercu)
1st Rocourt Madison (with Patrick Sercu)
1st Antwerpen Omnium
1st Gent Omnium (with Daniel Van Ryckeghem)
1st Madrid Madison (with Jan Janssen)
1st Antwerpen Omnium (with Patrick Sercu)
1st Rocourt Omnium (with Patrick Sercu)
1st Ostende Omnium (with Patrick Sercu)
1st Brussels Omnium (24 October) (with Patrick Sercu)
1st Gent Omnium (1 November) (with Walter Godefroot)
1st Gent Omnium (7 November) (with Rik Van Steenbergen, Patrick Sercu, & Noël Van Clooster)
1st Brussels Omnium (15 November) (with Rik Van Steenbergen)
1st Lorient Omnium (Rudi Altig, Tom Simpson, & Howling)
1st Roubaix Omnium
1st Ostende Omnium (with Patrick Sercu)
1st Gent Omnium (with Ferdinand Bracke)
1968
1st Madison, National Championships (with Patrick Sercu)
1st Six Days of Charleroi (with Ferdinand Bracke)
1st Antwerpen Omnium
1st Gent Omnium (with Patrick Sercu)
1st Antwerpen Omnium (with Rik Van Looy)
1st Milan Omnium (with Vittorio Adorni)
1st Rocourt Omnium
1st Ostende Omnium (with Patrick Sercu)
1st Ostende Omnium
1st Rocourt Omnium
1st Milan Omnium (with Rudi Altig, Lucien Aimar, & Jean Jourdan)
1st Rome Omnium (with Vittorio Adorni
1st Milan Pursuit
1st Milan Omnium (with Rudi Altig)
1st Gent Omnium (with Guido Reybrouck)
1969
1st Madison, European Championships (with Patrick Sercu)
1st Gent Omnium (with Roger De Vlaeminck & Walter Godefroot)
1st Antwerpen Omnium
1st Rome Omnium
1st Ostende Omnium
1st Antwerpen Omnium (with Jacques Anquetil, Rudi Altig & Harm Ottenbros)
1st Gent Omnium (with Julien Stevens)
1st Gand Omnium (with Roger De Vlaeminck)
1st Charleroi Omnium (with Ferdinand Bracke)
1970
1st Antwerpen Omnium (with Julien Stevens)
1st Charleroi Omnium
1st Charleroi Madison (with Julien Stevens)
1st Grenoble Omnium
1st Milan Omnium (with Jean-Pierre Monseré)
1971
1st Six Days of Milan (with Julien Stevens)
1st Vincennes Omnium
1972
Hour record: 49.431 km
1st Gent Omnium (with Walter Godefroot and Patrick Sercu)
1973
1st Madison, National Championships (with Patrick Sercu)
1st Six Days of Dortmund (with Patrick Sercu)
1st Six Days of Grenoble (with Patrick Sercu)
1st Oostende Omnium
1st Gent Omnium
1974
1st Six Days of Antwerp (with Patrick Sercu)
1st Genève Omnium
1st Luxembourg Omnium
1st Rotterdam Omnium
1st Madrid Omnium
1975
1st Omnium, European Championships
1st Madison, National Championships (with Patrick Sercu)
1st Six Days of Ghent (with Patrick Sercu)
1st Six Days of Antwerp (with Patrick Sercu)
1st Six Days of Grenoble (with Patrick Sercu)
1st Genève Omnium
1st Zürich Omnium
1st Antwerp Omnium
1st Valkenburg Omnium
1976
1st Madison, National Championships (with Patrick Sercu)
1st Six Days of Antwerp (with Patrick Sercu)
1st Six Days of Rotterdam (with Patrick Sercu)
1st Marseille Omnium
1st Antwerp Omnium (with Rik Van Linden)
1st Gent Omnium
1st Vincennes Omnium
1977
1st Madison, European Championships (with Patrick Sercu)
1st Six Days of Munich (with Patrick Sercu)
1st Six Days of Zürich (with Patrick Sercu)
1st Six Days of Ghent (with Patrick Sercu)
1st Six Days of Maastricht (with Patrick Sercu)
1st Six Days of Berlin (with Patrick Sercu)
1978
1st Zürich Omnium (with Patrick Sercu)

== Win rate ==
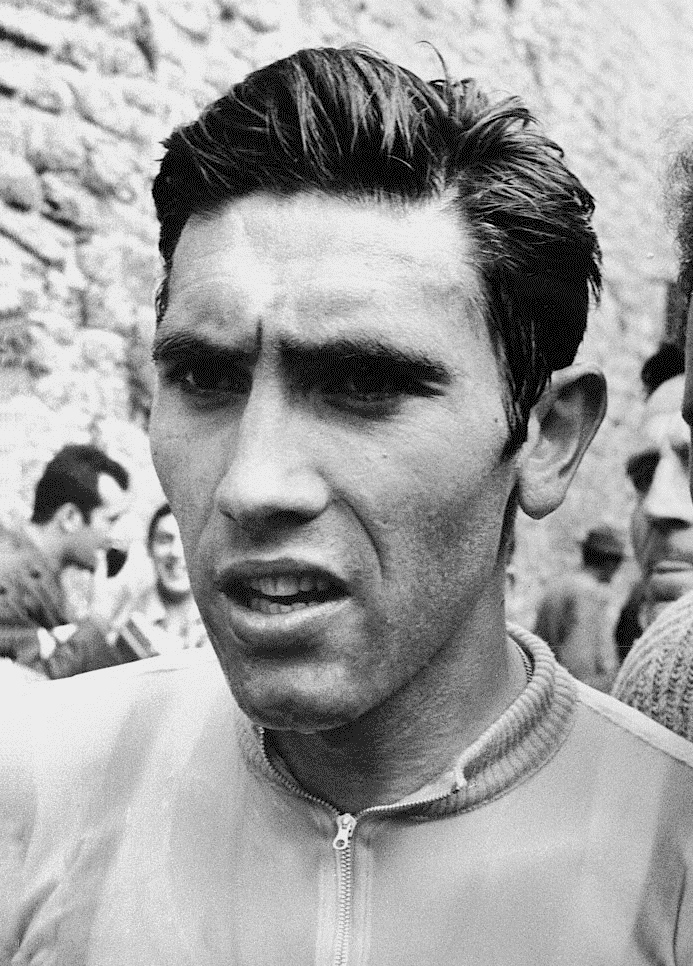
Merckx after finishing a time trial stage of the Giro d'Italia. San Marino, 6 June 1968

In his best year, Merckx won almost every other race he rode. Merckx won the equivalent of a race a week for six years. This table shows his strike rate of wins as a percentage of races undertaken.

| Year | Races | Won | Percentage |
|---|---|---|---|
| 1961 | 14 | 1 | 7,7% |
| 1962 | 55 | 23 | 41,8% |
| 1963 | 78 | 28 | 35,9% |
| 1964 | 74 | 24 | 32,4% |
| 1965 | 74 | 13 | 17,6% |
| 1966 | 95 | 20 | 21,1% |
| 1967 | 113 | 26 | 23,0% |
| 1968 | 129 | 32 | 24,8% |
| 1969 | 129 | 43 | 33,3% |
| 1970 | 138 | 52 | 37,7% |
| 1971 | 120 | 54 | 45,0% |
| 1972 | 127 | 50 | 39,4% |
| 1973 | 136 | 51 | 37,5% |
| 1974 | 140 | 38 | 27,1% |
| 1975 | 151 | 38 | 25,2% |
| 1976 | 111 | 15 | 13,5% |
| 1977 | 119 | 17 | 14,3% |
| 1978 | 5 | 0 | 0,0% |

Overall: 1808 races entered, 525 wins for a win rate of 29%.

1961–1964: Amateur results. 5 of the 74 races in 1965 were as amateur, of which 4 were won.

== Records ==
=== Road ===
See Eddy Merckx records overview

=== Track ===
- 17 Six-day races, of which 15 with Patrick Sercu.
- 3 European championships (Omnium: 1975 Madison: 1969, 1977)
- 8 Belgian Madison championships with Patrick Sercu: 1963, 1964, 1965, 1966, 1967, 1973, 1975 & 1976

=== World record ===
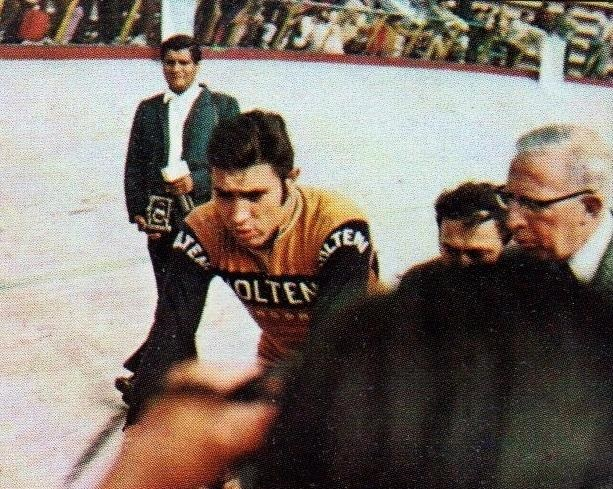
Merckx during his hour record attempt in Mexico City, 1972

| Discipline | Record | Date | Event | Velodrome | Ref |
|---|---|---|---|---|---|
| Hour record | 49.431 km | 25 October 1972 | — | Agustín Melgar Olympic Velodrome, Mexico City | |
