= Antoine Houbrechts =

Belgian cyclist

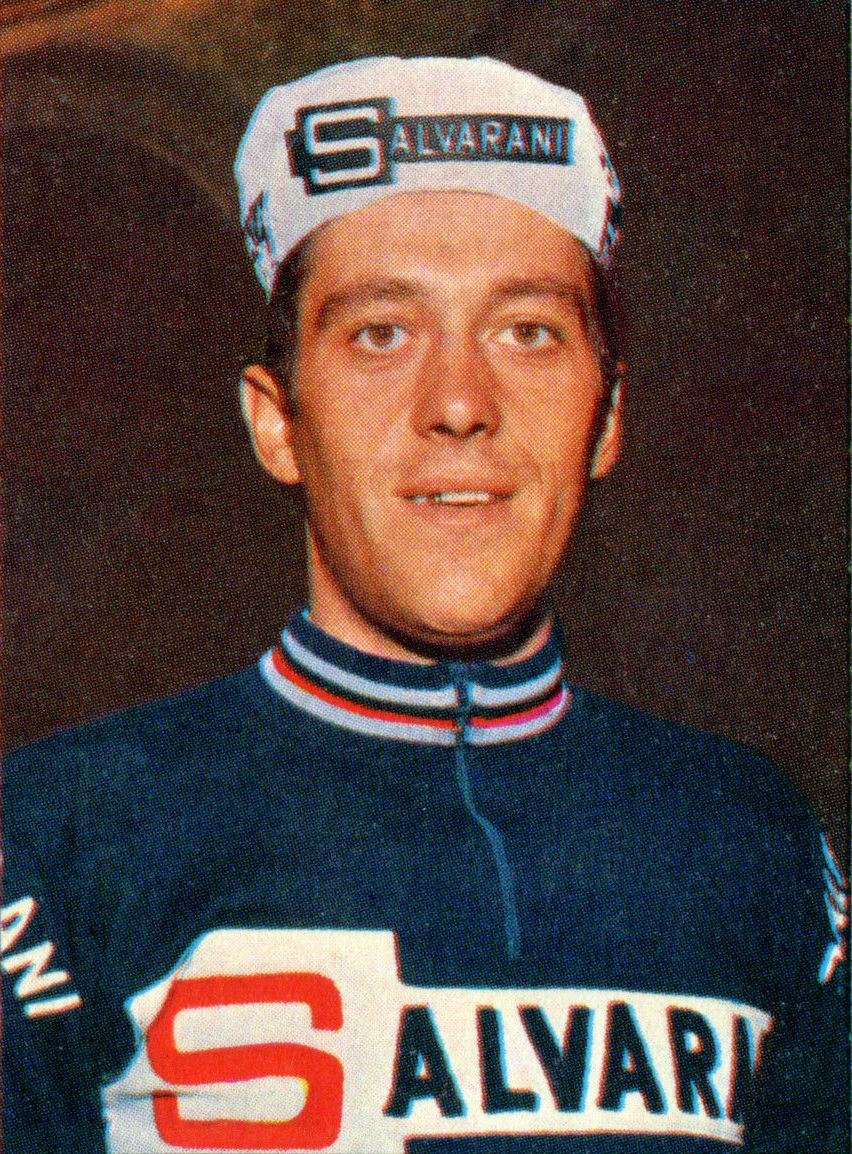

Personal information
- Full name: Antoine Houbrechts
- Nickname: Antoon
- Born: 6 September 1943 (age 83) Tongeren, Belgium

Cycling career
- Sport: Cycling
- Current team: Retired
- Discipline: Road
- Role: Rider

Professional teams
- 1965: Flandria–Romeo
- 1966: Dr. Mann–Grundig
- 1967–1969: Flandria–De Clerck
- 1970–1972: Salvarani
- 1973: Rokado
- 1974–1977: Bianchi–Campagnolo
- 1978: Mini-Flat–Boule d'Or–Colnago
- 1979: Safir–Geuze–Saint-Louis–Ludo

Major wins
- Grand Tours Giro d'Italia 1 TTT stage (1971) Stage races Tirreno–Adriatico (1970)

Antoine Houbrechts (born 6 September 1943) is a Belgian retired road racing cyclist, who competed professionally between 1965 and 1979. He won Tirreno–Adriatico in 1970, and rode the Tour de France five times.

== Major results ==
1965
4th Overall Volta a Portugal

1st Stage 6

7th Druivenkoers Overijse
8th Grand Prix d'Isbergues
9th Grand Prix de Fourmies
1966
5th Druivenkoers Overijse
6th Hoeilaart-Diest-Hoeilaart
1967
1st Overall Volta a Portugal

1st Stages 2b & 5a (ITT)

3rd Heist-op-den-Berg
8th Omloop van het Zuidwesten
10th Grand Prix des Nations
1968
1st Overall Vuelta a Andalucía
5th Overall Tour of Belgium
6th Overall Tour de Suisse
8th Overall Paris–Nice
1969
1st Druivenkoers Overijse
2nd Polymultipliée
3rd Overall Tour de Romandie
4th Overall Vuelta a Andalucía
5th Overall Tour of Belgium
5th Gent–Wevelgem
6th Scheldeprijs
7th Grand Prix Pino Cerami
10th Giro di Lombardia
1970
1st Overall Tirreno–Adriatico
7th Overall Giro di Sardegna

1st Stage 6

8th Overall Tour de France
1971
1st Giro dell'Umbria
2nd Giro di Toscana
2nd Grand Prix Pino Cerami
4th Overall Volta a Catalunya
4th Giro di Lombardia
4th Tre Valli Varesine
5th Liège–Bastogne–Liège
5th Druivenkoers Overijse
6th Coppa Agostoni
8th Overall Giro d'Italia

1st Prologue (TTT)
Held after Prologue

8th Tour of Flanders
10th Giro della Romagna
1972
1st Coppa Sabatini
1st Nokere Koerse
2nd Overall Giro di Sardegna

1st Stage 3

4th Gent–Wevelgem
4th Grand Prix de Monaco
5th Giro di Lombardia
7th Giro dell'Emilia
9th Overall Volta a Catalunya
10th Overall Tirreno–Adriatico
10th Milano–Torino
1973
1st GP Union Dortmund
2nd Overall Vuelta a Mallorca

1st Stage 4b (ITT)

3rd Druivenkoers Overijse
4th Züri-Metzgete
7th Overall Tour of Belgium
7th Overall Giro di Sardegna
8th Grote Prijs Jef Scherens
1974
3rd Omloop van de Fruitstreek
4th Tre Valli Varesine
4th Druivenkoers Overijse
6th Giro del Veneto
10th Giro dell'Emilia
1975
4th Overall Giro di Sardegna
6th Overall Setmana Catalana de Ciclisme
7th Trofeo Laigueglia
9th Giro di Lombardia
1976
2nd Giro dell'Umbria
2nd Circuit des Frontières
3rd Paris–Brussels
6th Trofeo Laigueglia
1978
8th Overall Volta a Catalunya

1st Stage 4

8th Ronde van Limburg
1979
3rd Nokere Koerse
10th Züri-Metzgete

=== Grand Tour general classification results timeline ===
Grand Tour	1966	1967	1968	1969	1970	1971	1972	1973	1974	1975	1976	1977
Vuelta a España	Did not contest during career											
Giro d'Italia	52	—	—	—	20	8	15	—	13	25	15	29
Tour de France	—	—	16	—	8	—	13	16	—	24	—	—

Legend
—	Did not compete
DNF	Did not finish
