= Martin Van Den Bossche =

Belgian cyclist

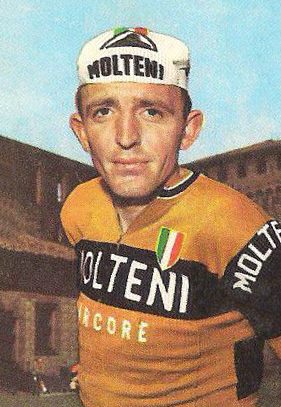

Personal information
- Full name: Martin Van Den Bossche
- Born: 10 March 1941 (age 85) Hingene, Belgium

Cycling career
- Sport: Cycling
- Discipline: Road
- Role: Rider

Major wins
- Grand Tours Giro d'Italia Mountains classification (1970)

Martin Van Den Bossche (born 10 March 1941) is a retired Belgian professional road bicycle racer. Van Den Bossche finished in the top 10 of the Tour de France twice, and won the Mountains classification of the 1970 Giro d'Italia.

== Major results ==
1963
4th Druivenkoers Overijse
1964
1st Schaal Sels-Merksem
4th Grand Prix des Nations
5th Road race, National Road Championships
5th Liège–Bastogne–Liège
5th GP Stad Zottegem
7th Grand Prix de Denain
1965
3rd Liège–Bastogne–Liège
4th Scheldeprijs
5th Grand Prix Pino Cerami
7th Grand Prix de Denain
9th GP Stad Zottegem
1966
2nd Grand Prix de Denain
9th Road race, National Road Championships
10th Road race, UCI Road World Championships
10th Overall Tour de France
1967
3rd Circuit des Frontières
3rd GP Stad Vilvoorde
8th Overall Tour of Belgium
8th Grand Prix Pino Cerami
1968
1st Stage 3a (TTT) Paris–Luxembourg
2nd Coppa Ugo Agostoni
4th Overall Setmana Catalana de Ciclisme

1st Stage 1

5th Giro di Lombardia
5th Tre Valli Varesine
6th Grand Prix Pino Cerami
8th Ronde van Limburg
1969
1st Grote Prijs Beeckman-De Caluwé
2nd Overall À travers Lausanne
2nd Milano–Torino
3rd Druivenkoers Overijse
4th Giro di Lombardia
1970
2nd Druivenkoers Overijse
3rd Overall Giro d'Italia

1st Mountains classification

4th Overall Tour de France
7th Road race, National Road Championships
8th Overall Paris–Nice
9th Overall Giro di Sardegna
10th Overall Tour de Romandie
1971
9th Grand Prix Pino Cerami
1972
1st Giro del Lazio
1st Stage 1a (ITT) Escalada a Montjuïc
4th Scheldeprijs

=== Grand Tour general classification results timeline ===
Grand Tour	1966	1967	1968	1969	1970	1971	1972
Vuelta a España	—	—	38	—	—	—	—
Giro d'Italia	—	—	DNF	—	3	—	29
Tour de France	10	59	—	23	4	—	15

Legend
—	Did not compete
DNF	Did not finish
