= Giancarlo Ferretti =

Italian cyclist (1941–2026)

Personal information
- Full name: Giancarlo Ferretti
- Nickname: 'Iron Sergeant'
- Born: 9 August 1941 Lugo, Italy
- Died: 9 August 2026 (aged 85)

Cycling career
- Sport: Cycling
- Discipline: Road
- Role: Rider, directeur sportif

Professional teams
- 1963–1965: Legnano
- 1966: Sanson
- 1967–1970: Salvarani

Managerial teams
- 1973–1984: Bianchi–Campagnolo
- 1986–1993: Ariostea–Gres
- 1994–1998: GB–MG Maglificio
- 2004–2005: Fassa Bortolo

Giancarlo Ferretti (9 August 1941 – 9 August 2026) was an Italian road cyclist and later the manager of the now-disbanded Italian professional road bicycle racing team, Fassa Bortolo, sponsored by the Italian cement company of the same name.

== Career ==
=== As a manager ===
Fassa Bortolo was a top-ranked team until the 2005 season, during which it was part of the UCI ProTour. Among its former riders was classics specialist Michele Bartoli, super-sprinter Alessandro Petacchi, stage racer Ivan Basso, Juan Antonio Flecha, time trial specialist Fabian Cancellara, and many others.

In pursuit of new sponsorship for the team, Ferretti believed that Sony Ericsson was interested. However, on 14 October 2005, a man claiming to represent proposed new sponsor Sony Ericsson turned out to be an impostor, leaving all staff and riders unemployed.

His strong personality earned him the nickname the Iron Sergeant. He has been criticized by former riders for being too demanding, strict, and commanding. Uniquely in cycling, when he was the manager of Fassa Bortolo he was made an employee of Fassa Bortolo, the company, and earned some respect for it.

== Death ==
Ferretti died on 9 August 2026, at the age of 85.

== Major results ==
1962
5th Overall Tour de l'Avenir
1963
7th Giro dell'Emilia
1964
5th Coppa Sabatini
6th Overall Giro di Sardegna
1965
3rd Tour de Berne
4th Giro di Toscana
10th Corsa Coppi
1966
8th Overall Tour de Suisse
1967
8th Paris–Tours
1968
3rd Overall Volta a Catalunya
5th Coppa Agostoni
7th GP Forli
1969
9th Trofeo Masferrer
1972
1st Trofeo Alcide De Gasperi
