= 1970 Giro d'Italia =

Race details
- Dates: 18 May - 7 June 1970
- Stages: 20
- Distance: 3,292 km (2,046 mi)
- Winning time: 90h 08' 47"

Results
Jersey awarded to the overall winner	Winner	Eddy Merckx (BEL)	(Faemino)
	Second	Felice Gimondi (ITA)	(Salvarani)
	Third	Martin Van Den Bossche (BEL)	(Molteni)
Jersey awarded to the points classification winner	Points	Franco Bitossi (ITA)	(Filotex)
	Mountains	Martin Van Den Bossche (BEL)	(Molteni)
	Team	Faemino	

The 1970 Giro d'Italia was the 53rd edition of the Giro, one of cycling's Grand Tours. The 3,292-kilometre (2,046 mi) race consisted of 20 stages, starting in San Pellegrino Terme on 18 May and finishing Bolzano on 7 June. There was one time trial stage and a single rest day. Eddy Merckx of the Faemino team won the overall general classification, his second victory. Italians Felice Gimondi (Salvarani) placed second, 3 min and 14 s slower than Merckx, and Martin Van Den Bossche (Molteni) was third, nearly five minutes behind Merckx.

== Teams ==
Thirteen teams were invited by the race organizers to participate in the 1970 edition of the Giro d'Italia. In total, 86 riders were from Italy, while the remaining 44 riders came from: Belgium (24), Spain (10), Switzerland (4), Germany (3), Sweden (2), and Denmark (1). Each team sent a squad of ten riders, which meant that the race started with a peloton of 130 cyclists. Of those starting, 48 were riding the Giro d'Italia for the first time. The average age of riders was 26.37 years, ranging from 21–year–old Wilmo Francioni (Ferretti) to 36–year–old Aldo Moser (G.B.C.). The team with the youngest average rider age was Magniflex (23), while the oldest was Scic (28). 97 made it to the finish in Bolzano.

The teams that took part in the race were:

- Cosatto
- Dreher
- Faemino
- Ferretti
- Filotex
- G.B.C.
- Germanvox
- La Casera
- Magniflex
- Molteni
- Sagit
- Salvarani
- Scic

== Pre-race favorites ==
The starting peloton did feature the previous year's winner Felice Gimondi (Salvarani). Despite an initial unwillingness to participate relating to his expulsion the year before, Eddy Merckx chose to enter the race after the race organizers agreed to send all doping controls to Rome rather than conduct them in a van that moved with the race. Merckx entered as the primary favorite to win the race. He entered the race having already won several races that season including: Paris–Nice, Paris–Roubaix, and La Flèche Wallonne, among others. Le Confédéré felt that Merckx's greatest challenge would come not from Italian riders, but the Belgian Walter Godefroot (Salvarani). Godefroot was thought to be the leader for the Salvarani team as Gimondi entered the race in poor form. Gianni Motta was absent from the race as he was recovering from a knee operation earlier in the season.

== Route and stages ==
The route was revealed on 31 March 1970 by race director Vincenzo Torriani. The race covered 3,311 km (2,057 mi) across twenty stages and one rest day. Compared to the previous edition, the 1970 edition was shorter and included only four stages longer than 200 km (124 mi) with stage 14 being the longest at 218 km (135 mi). In April, the route was announced to have nineteen categorized climbs that awarded points towards the mountains classification, while the final route included seven more categorized climbs. In total, 25.6 km (16 mi) were climbed.

San Pellegrino Terme hosted the race's start and then it travelled west, visiting the Alps before turning south and then east towards Treviso. A transfer then occurred to Terracina and the race moved north along the coast. The race made its way to the Dolomites for three stages before finishing in Bolzano. The route did not visit Milan for the first time in race history.

The route featured less transition stages than in previous years, which was thought to allow for more action in the race.

Stage characteristics and results
Stage	Date	Course	Distance	Type	Winner
1	18 May	San Pellegrino Terme to Biandronno	115 km (71 mi)	Plain stage	Franco Bitossi (ITA)
2	19 May	Comerio to Saint-Vincent	164 km (102 mi)	Stage with mountain(s)	Eddy Merckx (BEL)
3	20 May	Saint-Vincent to Aosta	162 km (101 mi)	Stage with mountain(s)	Franco Bitossi (ITA)
4	21 May	Saint-Vincent to Lodi	205 km (127 mi)	Plain stage	Marino Basso (ITA)
5	22 May	Lodi to Zingonia	155 km (96 mi)	Plain stage	Patrick Sercu (BEL)
6	23 May	Zingonia to Malcesine	212 km (132 mi)	Stage with mountain(s)	Enrico Paolini (ITA)
7	24 May	Malcesine to Brentonico	130 km (81 mi)	Stage with mountain(s)	Eddy Merckx (BEL)
8	25 May	Rovereto to Bassano del Grappa	130 km (81 mi)	Stage with mountain(s)	Walter Godefroot (BEL)
9	26 May	Bassano del Grappa to Treviso	56 km (35 mi)	Individual time trial	Eddy Merckx (BEL)
	27 May	Rest day			
10	28 May	Terracina to Rivisondoli	172 km (107 mi)	Stage with mountain(s)	Italo Zilioli (ITA)
11	29 May	Rivisondoli to Francavilla al Mare	180 km (112 mi)	Stage with mountain(s)	Michele Dancelli (ITA)
12	30 May	Francavilla al Mare to Loreto	175 km (109 mi)	Stage with mountain(s)	Miguel María Lasa (ESP)
13	31 May	Loreto to Faenza	188 km (117 mi)	Plain stage	Michele Dancelli (ITA)
14	1 June	Faenza to Casciana Terme	218 km (135 mi)	Plain stage	Michele Dancelli (ITA)
15	2 June	Casciana Terme to Mirandola	215 km (134 mi)	Stage with mountain(s)	Marino Basso (ITA)
16	3 June	Mirandola to Lido di Jesolo	195 km (121 mi)	Plain stage	Dino Zandegù (ITA)
17	4 June	Lido di Jesolo to Arta Terme	165 km (103 mi)	Stage with mountain(s)	Franco Bitossi (ITA)
18	5 June	Arta Terme to Marmolada	180 km (112 mi)	Stage with mountain(s)	Michele Dancelli (ITA)
19	6 June	Rocca Pietore to Dobbiaco	120 km (75 mi)	Stage with mountain(s)	Franco Bitossi (ITA)
20	7 June	Dobbiaco to Bolzano	155 km (96 mi)	Stage with mountain(s)	Luciano Armani (ITA)
	Total		3,292 km (2,046 mi)		

== Classification leadership ==
Two different jerseys were worn during the 1970 Giro d'Italia. The leader of the general classification – calculated by adding the stage finish times of each rider – wore a pink jersey. This classification is the most important of the race, and its winner is considered as the winner of the Giro.

For the points classification, which awarded a cyclamen jersey to its leader, cyclists were given points for finishing a stage in the top 15. Before the start of the 1970, Termozeta replaced Dreher Brewery as the sponsor of the points classification and so the color of the leader's jersey changed from red to cyclamen.

A third classification was the mountains classification. In this ranking, points were won by reaching the summit of a climb ahead of other cyclists. No jersey was worn by its leader. The climbs were ranked in first and second categories, the former awarded 50, 30, and 20 points while the latter awarded 30, 20, and 10 points. In this ranking, points were won by reaching the summit of a climb ahead of other cyclists. In addition there was the Cima Coppi, the Passo Pordoi, which was the highest mountain crossed in this edition of the race, which gave 200, 100, 80, 70, and 50 points to the first five riders summit the climb. The first rider over the Passo Pordoi was Luciano Armani.

There was also one classification for the teams, based on points. Riders scored points for their team if they were amongst the first 15 to finish a stage, at intermediate sprints, and mountain tops, and for leading the general classification.

A minor classification was the intermediate sprints classification, called the traguardi tricolori. On intermediate sprints, the first rider received 30 points for this classification, and the second rider 10 points. No jersey was used to indicate the leader. There was no time bonus at these intermediate sprints, and no points for the points classification.

Classification leadership by stage
Stage	Winner	General classification	Points classification	Mountains classification	Intermediate sprints classification	Team classification
1	Franco Bitossi	Franco Bitossi	Franco Bitossi	not awarded	?	?
2	Eddy Merckx	Franco Bitossi	Franco Bitossi	not awarded	Marino Basso	?
3	Franco Bitossi	Franco Bitossi	Franco Bitossi	Italo Zilioli	Marino Basso	?
4	Marino Basso	Franco Bitossi	Franco Bitossi	Italo Zilioli	Marino Basso	?
5	Patrick Sercu	Franco Bitossi	Franco Bitossi	Italo Zilioli	Marino Basso	?
6	Enrico Paolini	Franco Bitossi	Franco Bitossi	Martin Van Den Bossche	Marino Basso	?
7	Eddy Merckx	Eddy Merckx	Franco Bitossi	Eddy Merckx	Marino Basso	?
8	Walter Godefroot	Eddy Merckx	Franco Bitossi	Eddy Merckx	Marino Basso	?
9	Eddy Merckx	Eddy Merckx	Franco Bitossi	Eddy Merckx	Marino Basso	?
10	Italo Zilioli	Eddy Merckx	Franco Bitossi	Martin Van Den Bossche	Marino Basso	?
11	Michele Dancelli	Eddy Merckx	Franco Bitossi	Martin Van Den Bossche	Marino Basso	?
12	Miguel María Lasa	Eddy Merckx	Franco Bitossi	Martin Van Den Bossche	Marino Basso	?
13	Michele Dancelli	Eddy Merckx	Franco Bitossi	Martin Van Den Bossche	Marino Basso	?
14	Michele Dancelli	Eddy Merckx	Michele Dancelli	Martin Van Den Bossche	Marino Basso	?
15	Marino Basso	Eddy Merckx	Michele Dancelli	Martin Van Den Bossche	Marino Basso	?
16	Dino Zandegù	Eddy Merckx	Michele Dancelli	Martin Van Den Bossche	Marino Basso	?
17	Franco Bitossi	Eddy Merckx	Franco Bitossi	Martin Van Den Bossche	Marino Basso	Faemino
18	Michele Dancelli	Eddy Merckx	Michele Dancelli	Italo Zilioli	Giancarlo Polidori	Faemino
19	Franco Bitossi	Eddy Merckx	Franco Bitossi	Martin Van Den Bossche	Giancarlo Polidori	Faemino
20	Luciano Armani	Eddy Merckx	Franco Bitossi	Martin Van Den Bossche	Giancarlo Polidori	Faemino
Final		Eddy Merckx	Franco Bitossi	Martin Van Den Bossche	Giancarlo Polidori	Faemino

== Final standings ==
Legend
Pink jersey	Denotes the winner of the General classification
Violet jersey	Denotes the winner of the Points classification

=== General classification ===
Final general classification (1–10)
Rank	Name	Team	Time
1	Eddy Merckx (BEL)	Faemino	90h 08' 47"
2	Felice Gimondi (ITA)	Salvarani	+ 3' 14"
3	Martin Van Den Bossche (BEL)	Molteni	+ 4' 59"
4	Michele Dancelli (ITA)	Molteni	+ 7' 07"
5	Italo Zilioli (ITA)	Faemino	+ 8' 14"
6	Gösta Pettersson (SWE)	Ferretti	+ 9' 20"
7	Franco Bitossi (ITA)	Filotex	+ 13' 10"
8	Miguel María Lasa (ESP)	La Casera	+ 19' 25"
9	Ole Ritter (DEN)	Germanvox	+ 21' 17"
10	Vittorio Adorni (ITA)	Scic	+ 21' 29"

=== Mountains classification ===
Final mountains classification (1–10)
	Name	Team	Points
1	Martin Van Den Bossche (BEL)	Molteni	460
2	Italo Zilioli (ITA)	Faemino	420
3	Luciano Armani (ITA)	Scic	300
4	Eddy Merckx (BEL)	Faemino	210
5	Michele Dancelli (ITA)	Molteni	190
6	Franco Bitossi (ITA)	Filotex	100
7	Felice Gimondi (ITA)	Salvarani	70
7	Enrico Maggioni (ITA)	Feretti	70
9	Giancarlo Polidori (ITA)	Scic	60
10	Miguel María Lasa (ESP)	La Casera	50

=== Points classification ===
Final points classification (1–10)
	Name	Team	Points
1	Franco Bitossi (ITA)	Filotex	252
2	Michele Dancelli (ITA)	Molteni	241
3	Eddy Merckx (BEL)	Faemino	193
4	Martin Van Den Bossche (BEL)	Molteni	185
5	Felice Gimondi (ITA)	Salvarani	112
6	Italo Zilioli (ITA)	Faemino	97
7	Walter Godefroot (ITA)	Salvarani	97
8	Ole Ritter (DEN)	Germanvox	97
9	Patrick Sercu (BEL)	Dreher	95
10	Miguel María Lasa (ESP)	La Casera	94

=== Traguardi tricolori classification ===
Final traguardi tricolori classification (1–10)
	Name	Team	Points
1	Giancarlo Polidori (ITA)	Scic	130?
2	Roberto Ballini (ITA)	Dreher	80
3	Georges Vandenberghe (BEL)	Faemino	70
4	Luigi Sgarbozza (ITA)	Dreher	60
5	Michele Dancelli (ITA)	Molteni	60

=== Teams classification ===
Final team classification (1–10)
	Team	Points
1	Faemino	5830
2	Molteni	5350
3	Filotex	3890
4	Salvarani	3380
5	Scic	3140
6	Germanvox	2390
7	Ferretti	2080
8	Dreher	2020
9	La Casera	1840
10	Sagit	1200

== Doping cases ==
Alfio Poli tested positive during the 1970 Giro, and was penalized by 10 minutes in the general classification.
