= Italo Zilioli =

Italian cyclist

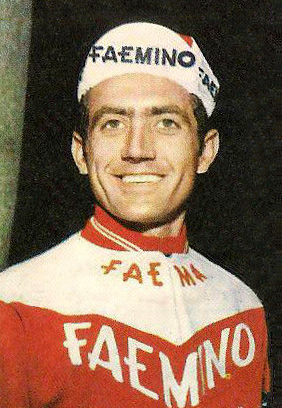

Personal information
- Full name: Italo Zilioli
- Born: 24 September 1941 (age 85) Turin, Italy

Cycling career
- Sport: Cycling
- Current team: Retired
- Discipline: Road
- Role: Rider

Amateur team
- 1960–1962: VC Gios

Professional teams
- 1962–1964: Carpano
- 1965–1966: Sanson
- 1967: Salvarani
- 1968–1969: Filotex
- 1970: Faemino–Faema
- 1971: Ferretti
- 1972: Salvarani
- 1973–1974: Dreherforte
- 1975: Magniflex
- 1976: Furzi–Vibor

Major wins
- Grand Tours Tour de France 1 individual stage (1970) Giro d'Italia 5 individual stages (1965, 1968, 1969, 1970, 1972) Stage races Tirreno–Adriatico (1971) Setmana Catalana de Ciclisme (1970) One-day races and Classics Züri-Metzgete (1966) Giro dell'Emilia (1963) Tre Valli Varesine (1963) Gran Piemonte (1970) Trofeo Laigueglia (1971)

Italo Zilioli (born 24 September 1941) is an Italian former professional cyclist.

Born in Turin, he won 58 races as a professional, including the 1966 Züri-Metzgete. He also totaled 5 stage wins at the Giro d'Italia; however, he never won the major tour of his country. He finished the Giro in the top 5 on six occasions and made the podium four times, finishing 2nd in 1964, 1965 and 1966, and finishing 3rd in 1969 as a member of Filotex.

During the 1970 Tour de France he won stage 2 and took over the Yellow jersey, which caused a minor controversy as it angered his teammate Eddy Merckx, who was anticipated to wear the jersey for the majority of the race and repeat as champion. Zilioli held the jersey for three stages before relinquishing it to Merckx.

Zilioli lives in the province of Cuneo (Piedmont) and is responsible for the stage starts for Giro d'Italia.

== Career achievements ==
=== Major results ===
1959
1st Road race, National Junior Road Championships
1963
1st Giro del Veneto
1st Giro dell'Appennino
1st Tre Valli Varesine
1st Giro dell'Emilia
2nd Gran Piemonte
5th Giro di Lombardia
6th Overall Tour de Suisse

1st Stage 1

1964
1st Coppa Ugo Agostoni
1st Coppa Sabatini
1st Giro del Veneto
1st GP Monaco
2nd Overall Giro d'Italia
2nd Milano–Torino
2nd Giro di Campania
3rd Road race, National Road Championships
3rd Overall Tour de Suisse
3rd Genoa–Nice
5th Giro di Lombardia
8th Trofeo Laigueglia
9th Giro di Romagna
10th Tre Valli Varesine
1965
1st Nice–Mont Agel
1st Caen (with Franco Balmamion)
1st Giro del Ticino
2nd Overall Giro d'Italia

1st Stage 18

2nd Coppa Placci
2nd Giro del Veneto
2nd Giro delle Tre Provincie
2nd Gran Premio Industria e Commercio di Prato
3rd Overall Paris–Nice
4th Tre Valli Varesine
1966
1st Gran Premio Industria e Commercio di Prato
1st Züri-Metzgete
2nd Overall Giro d'Italia
2nd Road race, National Road Championships
2nd Giro del Lazio
2nd Tre Valli Varesine
2nd Giro dell'Appennino
3rd Coppa Placci
3rd GP Montelupo
3rd GP Valsassina
6th Road race, UCI World Road Championships
7th Giro di Lombardia
7th Giro di Romagna
1967
5th Trofeo Laigueglia
7th Overall Paris–Nice
1968
1st Giro di Campania
2nd Overall Tirreno–Adriatico

1st Stage 3

2nd Overall Giro di Sardegna
4th Overall Giro d'Italia

1st Stage 5

1969
3rd Overall Giro d'Italia

1st Stage 19

3rd Road race, National Road Championships
3rd Giro della Provincia di reggio Calabria
4th Gran Premio Città di Camaiore
4th GP Alghero
7th Overall Tirreno–Adriatico
1970
1st Overall Setmana Catalana de Ciclisme

1st Stages 1b & 2

1st Giro del Piemonte
1st Giro delle Marche
Tour de France

1st Stage 2
Held after Stages 2–5b

1st Stage 2 Vuelta Ciclista a la Comunidad Valenciana
2nd Overall Tirreno–Adriatico
2nd Giro del Lazio
2nd Giro dell'Emilia
3rd Giro dell'Appennino
3rd GP Forli
4th Milan–San Remo
5th Overall Giro d'Italia

1st Stage 10

8th Trofeo Laigueglia
9th Liège–Bastogne–Liège
1971
1st Overall Tirreno–Adriatico

1st Stage 2

1st GP Cecina
1st Trofeo Laigueglia
1st Stages 2 & 5 Setmana Catalana de Ciclisme
2nd Giro del Veneto
3rd Tre Valli Varesine
7th Giro di Lombardia
9th Giro dell'Emilia
1972
1st Stage 10 Giro d'Italia
2nd Giro di Campania
3rd Col San Martino
5th G.P. Camaiore
5th Giro di Toscana
7th Giro di Romagna
1973
1st Giro dell'Appennino
1st Coppa Placci
1st GP Montelupo
3rd Road race, National Road Championships
3rd Tre Valli Varesine
9th Giro dell'Emilia
10th Giro di Lombardia
10th Overall Tirreno–Adriatico
1974
1st Stage 2 Tirreno–Adriatico
3rd Milano–Torino
5th Giro dell'Emilia
5th Giro di Romagna
1975
1st GP Cecina
2nd Overall Giro di Sardegna
5th Giro dell'Emilia
8th Trofeo Laigueglia
8th Milan–San Remo
8th Giro di Toscana
9th Overall Tour de Suisse
1976
2nd Giro dell'Emilia

=== Grand Tour general classification results timeline ===
Grand Tour	1963	1964	1965	1966	1967	1968	1969	1970	1971	1972	1973	1974	1975	1976
Vuelta a España	—	—	—	—	—	—	—	—	—	—	—	—	—	—
Giro d'Italia	18	2	2	2	DNF	4	3	5	22	DNF	14	DNF	39	16
Tour de France	—	—	—	—	—	DNF	—	13	—	DNF	—	—	—	—

Legend
—	Did not compete
DNF	Did not finish
