= Faemino–Faema =

Cycling team (1968–1970)

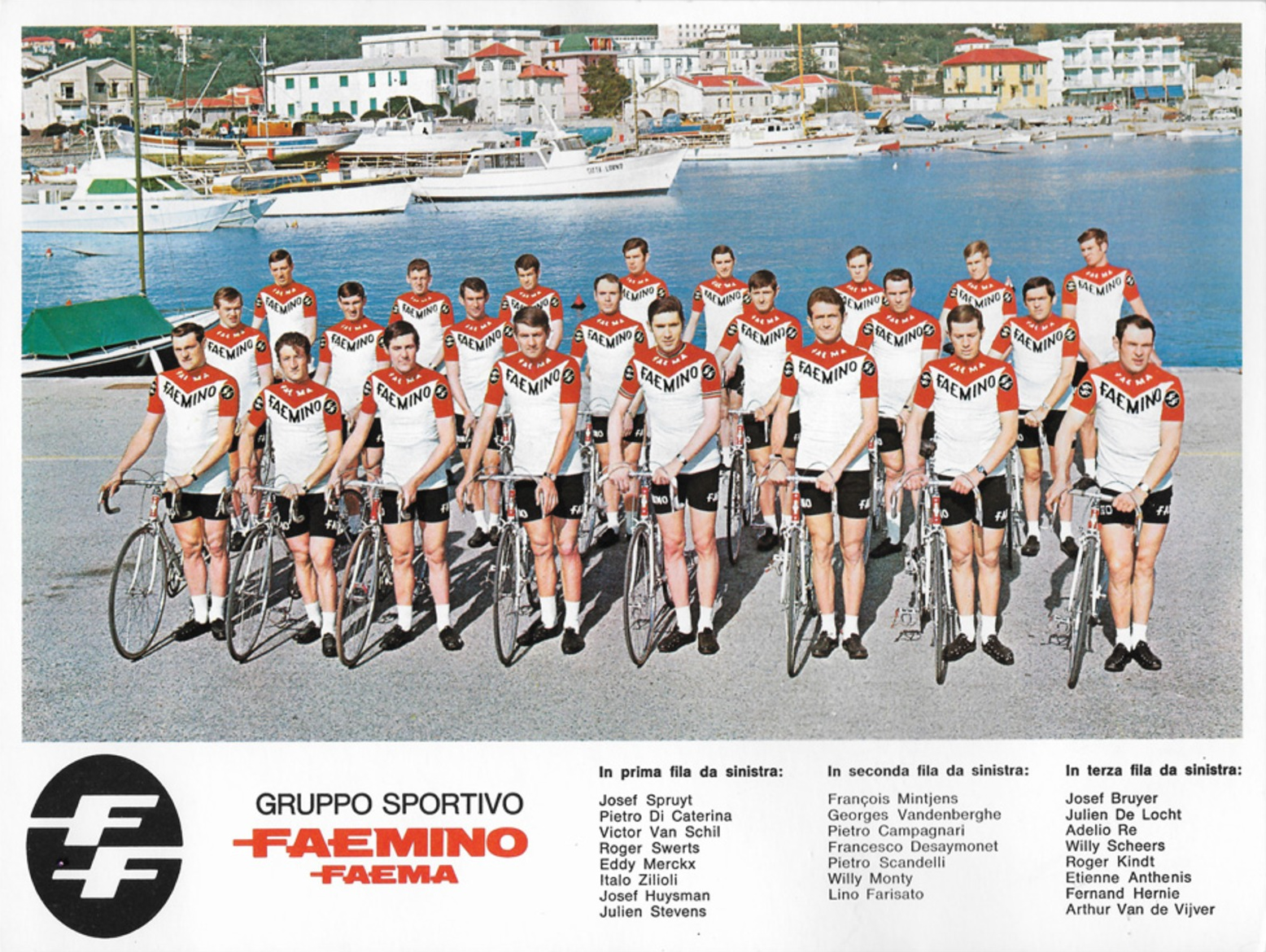
- The Faemino–Faema of 1970

Team information
- Registered: Italy (1968); Belgium (1969–1970)
- Founded: 1968
- Disbanded: 1970
- Discipline: Road
- Bicycles: Masi Bicycles (1968); Eddy Merckx Cycles (1969–1970)

Team name history
- 1968–1969 1970: Faema; Faemino–Faema
Faemino–Faema jersey
Jersey

Faemino–Faema was a professional cycling team that existed from 1968 to 1970. Faema's most prominent rider was Eddy Merckx who won his first four grand tours with the team.

== Major results ==
1968
GP Monaco, Roger Swerts
Romana Lombardo, Eddy Merckx
GP Lugano, Eddy Merckx
Overall Giro di Sardegna, Eddy Merckx

Stages 1 & 5b, Eddy Merckx
Stage 3, Guido Reybrouck

Stage 4a TTT Paris–Nice
Stage 1 Tirreno-Adriatico, Vittorio Adorni
Overall Volta Ciclista a Catalunya, Eddy Merckx

Stage 1, Guido Reybrouck
Stages 2 & 6b, Eddy Merckx
Stage 6a, Roger Swerts

Stages 2 & 4 Setmana-Catalana, Guido Reybrouck
Stage 3 Setmana-Catalana, Eddy Merckx
Trofeo Dicen, Eddy Merckx
Stage 2 Tour of Belgium, Eddy Merckx
Paris-Roubaix, Eddy Merckx
Brabantse Pijl, Victor Van Schil
Stage 13 Vuelta a España, Victor Van Schil
Overall Tour de Romandie, Eddy Merckx

Stage 1b, Eddy Merckx

Overall Giro d'Italia, Eddy Merckx

Team Classification
Mountains Classification, Eddy Merckx
Points Classification, Eddy Merckx
Stages 1, 8 & 12, Eddy Merckx
Stages 3, 11 & 22, Guido Reybrouck
Stage 10, Emilio Casalini
Stage 13, Lino Farisato

Giro delle Tre Provincie, Luciano Armani
Tre Valli Varesine, Eddy Merckx
Omloop der Zennevallei, Victor Van Schil
Stage 2 Paris–Luxembourg, Guido Reybrouck
Baden-Baden, Vittorio Adorni
Heist-op-den-Berg, Victor Van Schil
Circuit des Frontières, Guido Reybrouck
Paris - Tours, Guido Reybrouck
Overall A Travers Lausanne, Eddy Merckx

Stages 1 & 2, Eddy Merckx
