= 1970 Gent–Wevelgem =

Race details
- Dates: 1 April 1970
- Stages: 1
- Distance: 236 km (147 mi)
- Winning time: 5h 47' 50"

Results
	Winner	Eddy Merckx (BEL)	(Faemino–Faema)
	Second	Willy Vekemans (BEL)	(Hertekamp–Magniflex–Novy)
	Third	Walter Godefroot (BEL)	(Salvarani)

The 1970 Gent–Wevelgem was the 32nd edition of the Belgian Gent–Wevelgem cycle race and was held on 1 April 1970. The race started in Ghent and finished in Wevelgem. The race was won by Eddy Merckx of the Faemino–Faema team.

== General classification ==
Final general classification

Rank	Rider	Team	Time
1	Eddy Merckx (BEL)	Faemino–Faema	5h 47' 50"
2	Willy Vekemans (BEL)	Hertekamp–Magniflex–Novy	+ 10"
3	Walter Godefroot (BEL)	Salvarani	+ 10"
4	Roger Rosiers (BEL)	Bic	+ 10"
5	Patrick Sercu (BEL)	Dreher	+ 10"
6	Julien Stevens (BEL)	Faemino–Faema	+ 10"
7	Jan Janssen (NED)	Bic	+ 10"
8	Jean-Pierre Monseré (BEL)	Flandria–Mars	+ 10"
9	Georges Claes (BEL)	Hertekamp–Magniflex–Novy	+ 10"
10	Felice Gimondi (ITA)	Salvarani	+ 25"
