= 1964 Liège–Bastogne–Liège =

Race details
- Dates: 3 May 1964
- Stages: 1
- Distance: 245 km (152 mi)
- Winning time: 7h 06' 09"

Results
	Winner	Willy Bocklant (BEL)	(Flandria–Romeo)
	Second	Georges Van Coningsloo (BEL)	(Peugeot–BP–Englebert)
	Third	Vittorio Adorni (ITA)	(Salvarani)

The 1964 Liège–Bastogne–Liège was the 50th edition of the Liège–Bastogne–Liège cycle race and was held on 3 May 1964. The race started and finished in Liège. The race was won by Willy Bocklant of the Flandria team.

== General classification ==
Final general classification

Rank	Rider	Team	Time
1	Willy Bocklant (BEL)	Flandria–Romeo	7h 06' 09"
2	Georges Van Coningsloo (BEL)	Peugeot–BP–Englebert	+ 0"
3	Vittorio Adorni (ITA)	Salvarani	+ 0"
4	Jef Planckaert (BEL)	Flandria–Romeo	+ 16"
5	Martin Van Den Bossche (BEL)	Wiel's–Groene Leeuw	+ 22"
6	Dick Enthoven (NED)	Pelforth–Sauvage–Lejeune	+ 49"
7	Alfons Hermans (BEL)	Dr. Mann–Labo	+ 1' 20"
8	Willy Monty (BEL)	Pelforth–Sauvage–Lejeune	+ 1' 22"
9	Romain Van Wynsberghe (BEL)	Pelforth–Sauvage–Lejeune	+ 2' 48"
10	Théo Mertens (BEL)	Libertas	+ 3' 47"
