= 1969 Tour of Flanders =

Race details
- Dates: 30 March 1969
- Stages: 1
- Distance: 259 km (160.9 mi)
- Winning time: 6h 20'

Results
	Winner	Eddy Merckx (BEL)	(Faema)
	Second	Felice Gimondi (ITA)	(Salvarani)
	Third	Marino Basso (ITA)	(Molteni)

The 53rd running of the Tour of Flanders cycling race in Belgium was held on Sunday 30 March 1969. Belgian cycling legend Eddy Merckx won ahead of Italians Felice Gimondi and Marino Basso, winning his first of two in the Flemish classic. The race started in Ghent and finished in Gentbrugge.

== Course ==
Eddy Merckx won practically every major cycling event in 1969, including the Tour of Flanders. The race was run in abysmal weather conditions. Before the first climb of the day a group of 22 riders containing all the favourites was in the front. In Vollezele, not far after Geraardsbergen and despite strong headwind, Merckx attacked solo with 73 kilometers to go. His team manager Lomme Driessens heavily objected, thinking it was too soon and telling him to stop his effort, but Merckx powered on towards the finish. He arrived in Gentbrugge with a 5' 36" lead over runner-up Felice Gimondi, the biggest margin in the history of the Tour of Flanders. Marino Basso, leading the pack, finished third at eight minutes.

== Climbs ==
There were four categorized climbs:

- Kwaremont
- Kloosterstraat (Geraardsbergen)
- Valkenberg (Brakel)
- Kasteeldreef (Brakel)

== Results ==
	Cyclist	Team	Time
1	Eddy Merckx (BEL)	Faema	6h 20'
2	Felice Gimondi (ITA)	Salvarani	+ 5'36"
3	Marino Basso (ITA)	Molteni	+ 8'08"
4	Franco Bitossi (ITA)	Filotex	s.t.
5	Bernard Van de Kerckhove (BEL)	Faema	s.t.
6	Michele Dancelli (ITA)	Molteni	s.t.
7	Barry Hoban (GBR)	Mercier–BP–Hutchinson	s.t.
8	Frans Verbeeck (BEL)	Okay–Diamant	s.t.
9	Georges Claes jr (BEL)	Goldor-Hertekamp	s.t.
10	Jos Spruyt (BEL)	Faema	s.t.
