= 1968 Tour de Romandie =

Race details
- Dates: 9–12 May 1968
- Stages: 4
- Distance: 806.6 km (501.2 mi)
- Winning time: 21h 55' 58"

Results
	Winner	Eddy Merckx (BEL)
	Second	Raymond Delisle (FRA)
	Third	Robert Hagmann (SUI)

The 1968 Tour de Romandie was the 22nd edition of the Tour de Romandie cycle race and was held from 9 May to 12 May 1968. The race started and finished in Geneva. The race was won by Eddy Merckx.

== General classification ==
Final general classification
Rank	Rider	Time
1	Eddy Merckx (BEL)	21h 55' 58"
2	Raymond Delisle (FRA)	+ 1' 14"
3	Robert Hagmann (SUI)	+ 1' 27"
4	Mariano Díaz (ESP)	+ 2' 38"
5	Edy Schütz (LUX)	+ 2' 43"
6	Jean Dumont (FRA)	+ 2' 49"
7	Joaquim Galera (ESP)	+ 3' 01"
8	Michele Dancelli (ITA)	+ 3' 19"
9	André Bayssière (FRA)	+ 3' 40"
10	Italo Zilioli (ITA)	+ 3' 50"
