= 1970 Tirreno–Adriatico =

Race details
- Dates: 11–15 March 1970
- Stages: 5
- Distance: 913 km (567.3 mi)
- Winning time: 24h 50' 25"

Results
	Winner	Antoine Houbrechts (BEL)
	Second	Italo Zilioli (ITA)
	Third	Felice Gimondi (ITA)

The 1970 Tirreno–Adriatico was the fifth edition of the Tirreno–Adriatico cycle race and was held from 11 March to 15 March 1970. The race started in Casal Palocco and finished in San Benedetto del Tronto. The race was won by Antoine Houbrechts.

== General classification ==
Final general classification

Rank	Rider	Time
1	Antoine Houbrechts (BEL)	24h 50' 25"
2	Italo Zilioli (ITA)	+ 30"
3	Felice Gimondi (ITA)	+ 35"
4	Vittorio Adorni (ITA)	+ 1' 21"
5	Franco Bitossi (ITA)	+ 1' 22"
6	Patrick Sercu (BEL)	+ 1' 36"
7	Giancarlo Polidori (ITA)	+ 1' 46"
8	Marcello Bergamo (ITA)	+ 1' 59"
9	Renato Laghi (ITA)	+ 2' 34"
10	Aldo Moser (ITA)	+ 2' 40"
