= 1969 Tirreno–Adriatico =

Race details
- Dates: 11–15 March 1969
- Stages: 5
- Distance: 946.3 km (588.0 mi)
- Winning time: 23h 58' 18"

Results
	Winner	Carlo Chiappano (ITA)
	Second	Albert Van Vlierberghe (BEL)
	Third	Giuseppe Fezzardi (ITA)

The 1969 Tirreno–Adriatico was the fourth edition of the Tirreno–Adriatico cycle race and was held from 11 March to 15 March 1969. The race started in Bracciano and finished in San Benedetto del Tronto. The race was won by Carlo Chiappano.

== General classification ==
Final general classification

Rank	Rider	Time
1	Carlo Chiappano (ITA)	23h 58' 18"
2	Albert Van Vlierberghe (BEL)	+ 31"
3	Giuseppe Fezzardi (ITA)	+ 42"
4	Luigi Sgarbozza (ITA)	+ 1' 14"
5	Roberto Ballini (ITA)	+ 1' 31"
6	Ernesto Donghi (ITA)	+ 1' 36"
7	Italo Zilioli (ITA)	+ 2' 00"
8	Arturo Pecchielan (ITA)	+ 2' 15"
9	Aldo Moser (ITA)	+ 2' 55"
10	Franco Mori (ITA)	+ 4' 33"
