= 1969 Tour de Romandie =

Race details
- Dates: 7–11 May 1969
- Stages: 4
- Distance: 804 km (500 mi)
- Winning time: 22h 52' 37"

Results
	Winner	Felice Gimondi (ITA)
	Second	Vittorio Adorni (ITA)
	Third	Antoine Houbrechts (BEL)

The 1969 Tour de Romandie was the 23rd edition of the Tour de Romandie cycle race and was held from 7 May to 11 May 1969. The race started in Geneva and finished in Porrentruy. The race was won by Felice Gimondi.

== General classification ==
Final general classification
Rank	Rider	Time
1	Felice Gimondi (ITA)	22h 52' 37"
2	Vittorio Adorni (ITA)	+ 11"
3	Antoine Houbrechts (BEL)	+ 12"
4	Ugo Colombo (ITA)	+ 36"
5	Raymond Delisle (FRA)	+ 2' 35"
6	Bernard Vifian (BEL)	+ 2' 54"
7	Edy Schütz (LUX)	+ 3' 32"
8	Giuseppe Fezzardi (ITA)	+ 3' 35"
9	Louis Pfenninger (SUI)	+ 3' 50"
10	Michele Dancelli (ITA)	+ 4' 33"
