= 1972 La Flèche Wallonne =

Race details
- Dates: 23 April 1972
- Stages: 1
- Distance: 249 km (154.7 mi)
- Winning time: 6h 25' 00"

Results
	Winner	Eddy Merckx (BEL)	(Molteni)
	Second	Raymond Poulidor (FRA)	(Gan–Mercier–Hutchinson)
	Third	Willy Van Neste (BEL)	(Beaulieu–Flandria)

The 1972 La Flèche Wallonne was the 36th edition of La Flèche Wallonne cycle race and was held on 23 April 1972. The race started in Verviers and finished in Marcinelle. The race was won by Eddy Merckx of the Molteni team.

== General classification ==
Final general classification

Rank	Rider	Team	Time
1	Eddy Merckx (BEL)	Molteni	6h 25' 00"
2	Raymond Poulidor (FRA)	Gan–Mercier–Hutchinson	+ 0"
3	Willy Van Neste (BEL)	Beaulieu–Flandria	+ 0"
4	Gilbert Bellone (FRA)	Rokado–Colders	+ 0"
5	Georges Pintens (BEL)	Van Cauter–Magniflex–de Gribaldy	+ 0"
6	Alain Santy (FRA)	Bic	+ 0"
7	Gustaaf Van Roosbroeck (BEL)	Watney–Avia	+ 0"
8	Wim Schepers (BEL)	Rokado–Colders	+ 0"
9	Leif Mortensen (DEN)	Bic	+ 0"
10	Roger Swerts (BEL)	Molteni	+ 0"
