= 1971 Omloop Het Volk =

Race details
- Dates: 25 March 1971
- Stages: 1
- Distance: 198 km (123 mi)
- Winning time: 4h 45' 00"

Results
	Winner	Eddy Merckx (BEL)
	Second	Roger Rosiers (BEL)
	Third	Bernard Van de Kerckhove (BEL)

The 1971 Omloop Het Volk was the 26th edition of the Omloop Het Volk cycle race and was held on 25 March 1971. The race started and finished in Ghent. The race was won by Eddy Merckx.

== General classification ==
Final general classification
Rank	Rider	Time
1	Eddy Merckx (BEL)	4h 45' 00"
2	Roger Rosiers (BEL)	+ 1' 53"
3	Noël Vantyghem (BEL)	+ 1' 53"
4	Joseph Bruyère (BEL)	+ 1' 53"
5	Joseph Abelshausen (BEL)	+ 1' 53"
6	Jos Deschoenmaecker (BEL)	+ 1' 53"
7	Jos Huysmans (BEL)	+ 2' 00"
8	Guido Reybrouck (BEL)	+ 2' 27"
9	Jürgen Tschan (FRG)	+ 2' 27"
10	Cees Rentmeester (NED)	+ 2' 27"
