= 1966 UCI Road World Championships – Men's road race =

Men's Individual Road Race
1966 UCI Road World Championships
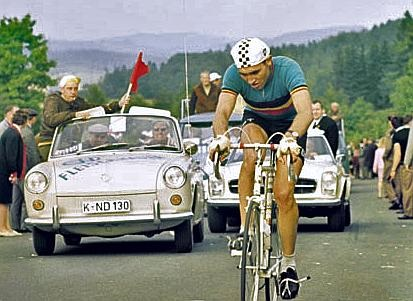
- Eddy Merckx near the finish line of the 1966 World Road Race Championship at the Nürburgring

Race details
- Dates: 28 August 1966
- Stages: 1
- Distance: 263.7 km (163.9 mi)
- Winning time: 7h 21' 10"

Results
	Winner	Rudi Altig (FRG)	(West Germany)
	Second	Jacques Anquetil (FRA)	(France)
	Third	Raymond Poulidor (FRA)	(France)

The men's road race at the 1966 UCI Road World Championships was the 33rd edition of the event. The race took place on Sunday 28 August 1966 in Adenau, West Germany. The race was won by Rudi Altig of West Germany.

Martin Van Den Bossche and Lucien Aimar near the end of the race

== Final classification ==
General classification (1–10)

Rank	Rider	Time
1st place, gold medalist(s)	Rudi Altig (FRG)	7h 21' 10"
2nd place, silver medalist(s)	Jacques Anquetil (FRA)	+ 0"
3rd place, bronze medalist(s)	Raymond Poulidor (FRA)	+ 0"
4	Gianni Motta (ITA)	+ 8"
5	Jean Stablinski (FRA)	+ 10"
6	Italo Zilioli (ITA)	+ 13"
7	Guido Reybrouck (BEL)	+ 35"
8	Jo de Roo (NED)	+ 35"
9	Lucien Aimar (FRA)	+ 35"
10	Martin Van Den Bossche (BEL)	+ 35"
