= 1972 Volta a Catalunya =

Race details
- Dates: 12–17 September 1972
- Stages: 5 + Prologue
- Distance: 927.6 km (576.4 mi)
- Winning time: 26h 01' 43"

Results
	Winner	Felice Gimondi (ITA)
	Second	José Antonio González (ESP)
	Third	Antonio Martos (ESP)

The 1972 Volta a Catalunya was the 52nd edition of the Volta a Catalunya cycle race and was held from 12 September to 17 September 1972. The race started in Tremp and finished in Badalona. The race was won by Felice Gimondi.

== General classification ==
Final general classification

Rank	Rider	Time
1	Felice Gimondi (ITA)	26h 01' 43"
2	José Antonio González (ESP)	+ 7"
3	Antonio Martos (ESP)	+ 56"
4	Santiago Lazcano (ESP)	+ 1' 16"
5	Domingo Perurena (ESP)	+ 1' 27"
6	Eduardo Castelló (ESP)	+ 1' 54"
7	Pedro Torres (ESP)	+ 2' 05"
8	Luis Santamarina (ESP)	+ 2' 18"
9	Antoine Houbrechts (BEL)	+ 2' 20"
10	Lucien Aimar (FRA)	+ 2' 25"
