= 1967 Gent–Wevelgem =

Race details
- Dates: 29 March 1967
- Stages: 1
- Distance: 242 km (150 mi)
- Winning time: 6h 09' 00"

Results
	Winner	Eddy Merckx (BEL)	(Peugeot–BP–Michelin)
	Second	Jan Janssen (NED)	(Pelforth–Sauvage–Lejeune)
	Third	Edward Sels (BEL)	(Flandria–De Clerck)

The 1967 Gent–Wevelgem was the 29th edition of the Belgian Gent–Wevelgem cycle race and was held on 29 March 1967. The race started in Ghent and finished in Wevelgem. The race was won by Eddy Merckx of the Peugeot team.

== General classification ==
Final general classification

Rank	Rider	Team	Time
1	Eddy Merckx (BEL)	Peugeot–BP–Michelin	6h 09' 00"
2	Jan Janssen (NED)	Pelforth–Sauvage–Lejeune	+ 0"
3	Edward Sels (BEL)	Flandria–De Clerck	+ 0"
4	Jos Huysmans (BEL)	Dr. Mann–Grundig	+ 0"
5	Herman Van Springel (BEL)	Dr. Mann–Grundig	+ 0"
6	Noël Foré (BEL)	Goldor–Gerka	+ 0"
7	Willy Planckaert (BEL)	Roméo–Smith's	+ 0"
8	Jaak De Boever (BEL)	Roméo–Smith's	+ 0"
9	Frans Melckenbeeck (BEL)	Groene Leeuw–Tibetan–Pull Over Centrale	+ 40"
10	Arthur Decabooter (BEL)	Groene Leeuw–Tibetan–Pull Over Centrale	+ 40"
