= 1967 Harelbeke–Antwerp–Harelbeke =

Race details
- Dates: 25 March 1967
- Stages: 1
- Distance: 216 km (134 mi)
- Winning time: 5h 26' 00"

Results
	Winner	Willy Bocklant (BEL)
	Second	Jos Huysmans (BEL)
	Third	Armand Desmet (BEL)

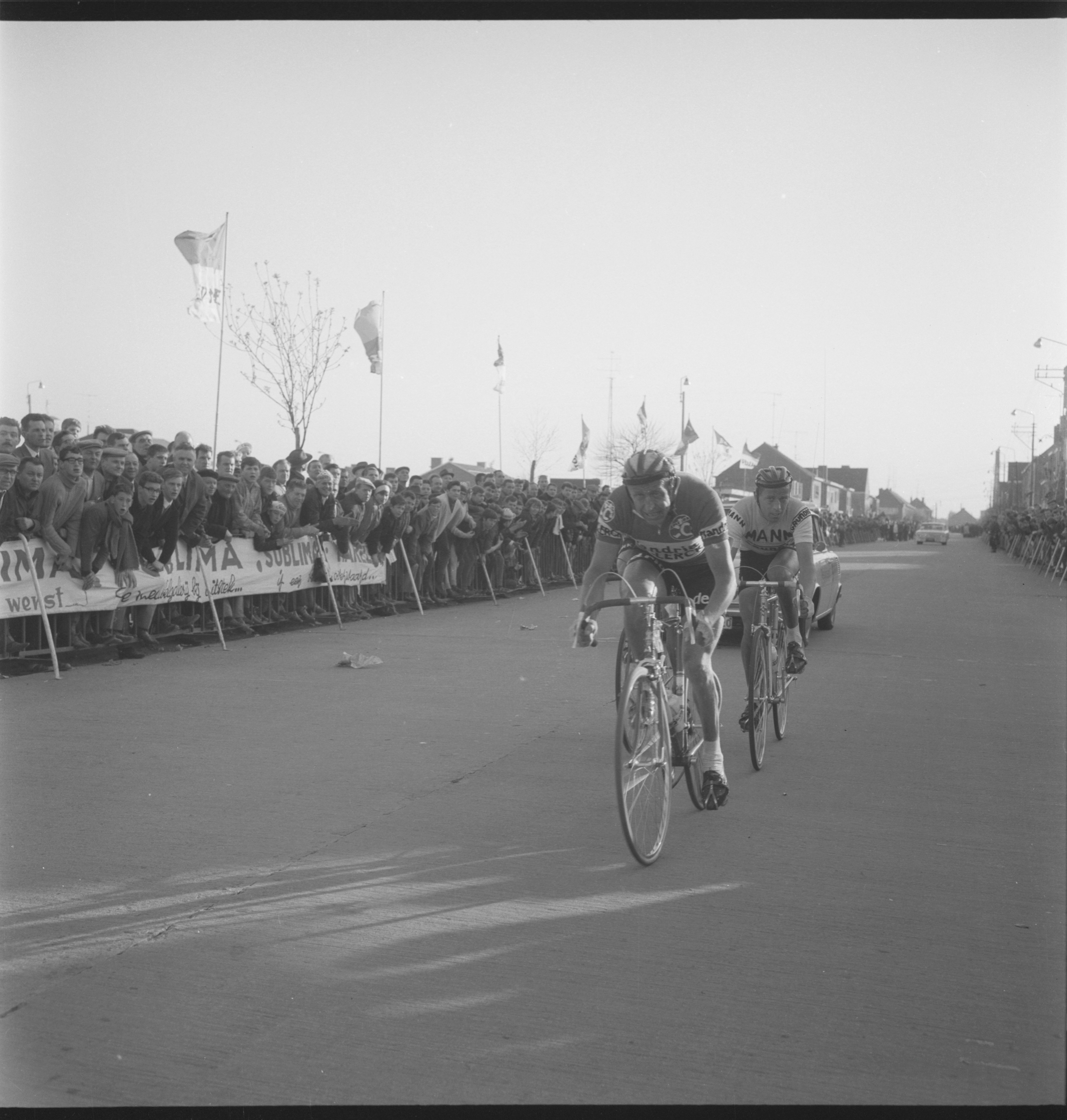
Armand Desmet in the lead through the streets of Harelbeke during the 1967 E3 Prijs Harelbeke.

The 1967 Harelbeke–Antwerp–Harelbeke (Note: The race was known as Harelbeke–Antwerp–Harelbeke (French: Harelbeke–Anvers–Harelbeke) for the first twelve editions. In 1970, the race became known as the E3, after the Belgian road which is now known as the E17.) was the 10th edition of the E3 Harelbeke cycle race and was held on 25 March 1967. The race started and finished in Harelbeke. The race was won by Willy Bocklant.

== General classification ==
Final general classification

Rank	Rider	Time
1	Willy Bocklant (BEL)	5h 26' 00"
2	Jos Huysmans (BEL)	+ 0"
3	Armand Desmet (BEL)	+ 5"
4	Walter Godefroot (BEL)	+ 5"
5	Edward Sels (BEL)	+ 5"
6	Rik Van Looy (BEL)	+ 5"
7	Gerben Karstens (NED)	+ 5"
8	Eddy Merckx (BEL)	+ 5"
9	Herman Van Springel (BEL)	+ 5"
10	Jan Janssen (NED)	+ 5"
