= 1967 La Flèche Wallonne =

Race details
- Dates: 28 April 1967
- Stages: 1
- Distance: 223 km (138.6 mi)
- Winning time: 5h 58' 00"

Results
	Winner	Eddy Merckx (BEL)	(Peugeot–BP–Michelin)
	Second	Peter Post (NED)	(Willem II–Gazelle)
	Third	Willy Bocklant (BEL)	(Flandria–De Clerck)

The 1967 La Flèche Wallonne was the 31st edition of La Flèche Wallonne cycle race and was held on 28 April 1967. The race started in Liège and finished in Marcinelle. The race was won by Eddy Merckx of the Peugeot team.

== General classification ==
Final general classification

Rank	Rider	Team	Time
1	Eddy Merckx (BEL)	Peugeot–BP–Michelin	5h 58' 00"
2	Peter Post (NED)	Willem II–Gazelle	+ 44"
3	Willy Bocklant (BEL)	Flandria–De Clerck	+ 1' 10"
4	Willy In 't Ven (BEL)	Dr. Mann–Grundig	+ 1' 10"
5	Walter Godefroot (BEL)	Flandria–De Clerck	+ 2' 05"
6	Willy Monty (BEL)	Pelforth–Sauvage–Lejeune	+ 2' 05"
7	Noël De Pauw (BEL)	Dr. Mann–Grundig	+ 2' 05"
8	Jos Huysmans (BEL)	Dr. Mann–Grundig	+ 2' 05"
9	Ferdinand Bracke (BEL)	Peugeot–BP–Michelin	+ 2' 10"
10	Georges Vandenberghe (BEL)	Roméo–Smith's	+ 2' 35"
