= 1972 Milan–San Remo =

Race details
- Dates: 18 March 1972
- Stages: 1
- Distance: 288 km (179 mi)
- Winning time: 6h 33' 32"

Results
	Winner	Eddy Merckx (BEL)	(Molteni)
	Second	Gianni Motta (ITA)	(Ferretti)
	Third	Marino Basso (ITA)	(Salvarani)

The 1972 Milan–San Remo was the 63rd edition of the Milan–San Remo cycle race and was held on 18 March 1972. The race started in Milan and finished in San Remo. The race was won by Eddy Merckx of the Molteni team.

== General classification ==
Final general classification

Rank	Rider	Team	Time
1	Eddy Merckx (BEL)	Molteni	6h 33' 32"
2	Gianni Motta (ITA)	Ferretti	+ 9"
3	Marino Basso (ITA)	Salvarani	+ 9"
4	Frans Verbeeck (BEL)	Watney–Avia	+ 9"
5	Rolf Wolfshohl (FRG)	Rokado–Colders	+ 9"
6	Michele Dancelli (ITA)	Scic	+ 9"
7	Domingo Perurena (ESP)	Kas–Kaskol	+ 9"
8	André Dierickx (BEL)	Beaulieu–Flandria	+ 9"
9	Gösta Pettersson (SWE)	Ferretti	+ 9"
10	Tomas Pettersson (SWE)	Ferretti	+ 9"
