= 1966 Omloop Het Volk =

Race details
- Dates: 5 March 1966
- Stages: 1
- Distance: 213 km (132 mi)
- Winning time: 5h 10' 00"

Results
	Winner	Jo de Roo (NED)
	Second	Walter Godefroot (BEL)
	Third	Eddy Merckx (BEL)

The 1966 Omloop Het Volk was the 21st edition of the Omloop Het Volk cycle race and was held on 5 March 1966. The race started and finished in Ghent. The race was won by Jo de Roo.

== General classification ==
Final general classification
Rank	Rider	Time
1	Jo de Roo (NED)	5h 10' 00"
2	Walter Godefroot (BEL)	+ 5"
3	Eddy Merckx (BEL)	+ 5"
4	Jozef Spruyt (BEL)	+ 5"
5	Willy Planckaert (BEL)	+ 5"
6	Herman Van Springel (BEL)	+ 5"
7	Frans Verbeeck (BEL)	+ 5"
8	André Planckaert (BEL)	+ 5"
9	Noël Foré (BEL)	+ 5"
10	Willy Bocklant (BEL)	+ 5"
