= 1972 Giro di Lombardia =

Race details
- Dates: 7 October 1972
- Stages: 1
- Distance: 266 km (165.3 mi)
- Winning time: 6h 47' 54"

Results
	Winner	Eddy Merckx (BEL)	(Molteni)
	Second	Cyrille Guimard (FRA)	(Gan–Mercier–Hutchinson)
	Third	Felice Gimondi (ITA)	(Salvarani)

The 1972 Giro di Lombardia was the 66th edition of the Giro di Lombardia cycle race and was held on 7 October 1972. The race started in Milan and finished in Como. The race was won by Eddy Merckx of the Molteni team.

== General classification ==
Final general classification

Rank	Rider	Team	Time
1	Eddy Merckx (BEL)	Molteni	6h 47' 54"
2	Cyrille Guimard (FRA)	Gan–Mercier–Hutchinson	+ 1' 27"
3	Felice Gimondi (ITA)	Salvarani	+ 1' 27"
4	Frans Verbeeck (BEL)	Watney–Avia	+ 1' 27"
5	Antoine Houbrechts (BEL)	Salvarani	+ 1' 27"
6	Joop Zoetemelk (NED)	Beaulieu–Flandria	+ 1' 27"
7	Raymond Delisle (FRA)	Peugeot–BP–Michelin	+ 1' 30"
8	Willy De Geest (BEL)	Van Cauter–Magniflex–de Gribaldy	+ 1' 39"
9	Franco Bitossi (ITA)	Filotex	+ 1' 39"
10	Michele Dancelli (ITA)	Scic	+ 1' 39"
