= 1968 Volta a Catalunya =

Race details
- Dates: 8–15 September 1968
- Stages: 8
- Distance: 1,417 km (880.5 mi)
- Winning time: 37h 57' 23"

Results
| | Winner | Eddy Merckx (BEL) |
| | Second | Felice Gimondi (ITA) |
| | Third | Giancarlo Ferretti (ITA) |

The 1968 Volta a Catalunya was the 48th edition of the Volta a Catalunya cycle race and was held from 8 September to 15 September 1968. The race started in Tona and finished in Barcelona. The race was won by Eddy Merckx.

== General classification ==
Final general classification

| Rank | Rider | Time |
|---|---|---|
| 1 | Eddy Merckx (BEL) | 37h 57' 23" |
| 2 | Felice Gimondi (ITA) | + 33" |
| 3 | Giancarlo Ferretti (ITA) | + 3' 51" |
| 4 | Luis Ocaña (ESP) | + 4' 19" |
| 5 | Domingo Perurena (ESP) | + 6' 07" |
| 6 | Manuel Galera (ESP) | + 6' 16" |
| 7 | Joaquim Galera (ESP) | + 6' 31" |
| 8 | Eduardo Castelló (ESP) | + 6' 54" |
| 9 | Ángel Ibáñez (ESP) | + 7' 29" |
| 10 | Lino Carletto (ITA) | + 7' 30" |
