= 1972 Gent–Wevelgem =

Race details
- Dates: 12 April 1972
- Stages: 1
- Distance: 245 km (152 mi)
- Winning time: 5h 50' 00"

Results
	Winner	Roger Swerts (BEL)	(Molteni)
	Second	Felice Gimondi (ITA)	(Salvarani)
	Third	Eddy Merckx (BEL)	(Molteni)

The 1972 Gent–Wevelgem was the 34th edition of the Belgian Gent–Wevelgem cycle race and was held on 12 April 1972. The race started in Ghent and finished in Wevelgem. The race was won by Roger Swerts of the Molteni team.

== General classification ==
Final general classification

Rank	Rider	Team	Time
1	Roger Swerts (BEL)	Molteni	5h 50' 00"
2	Felice Gimondi (ITA)	Salvarani	+ 0"
3	Eddy Merckx (BEL)	Molteni	+ 0"
4	Antoine Houbrechts (BEL)	Salvarani	+ 0"
5	Frans Verbeeck (BEL)	Watney–Avia	+ 0" (Note: Verbeeck was relegated to fifth for an irregular sprint, after crossing the line first.)
6	Albert Van Vlierberghe (BEL)	Ferretti	+ 48"
7	Walter Planckaert (BEL)	Watney–Avia	+ 48"
8	Michel Périn (FRA)	Gan–Mercier–Hutchinson	+ 1' 10"
9	Wim Schepers (NED)	Rokado–Colders	+ 1' 10"
10	Yves Hézard (FRA)	Sonolor–Lejeune	+ 1' 10"
