= 1970 Paris–Nice =

Race details
- Dates: 8–16 March 1970
- Stages: 8 + Prologue
- Distance: 1,410.5 km (876.4 mi)
- Winning time: 37h 23' 27"

Results
Jersey awarded to the overall winner	Winner	Eddy Merckx (BEL)	(Faemino–Faema)
	Second	Luis Ocaña (ESP)	(Bic)
	Third	Jan Janssen (NED)	(Bic)

The 1970 Paris–Nice was the 28th edition of the Paris–Nice cycle race and was held from 8 March to 16 March 1970. The race started in Paris and finished in Nice. The race was won by Eddy Merckx of the Faemino–Faema team.

== General classification ==
Final general classification

Rank	Rider	Team	Time
1	Eddy Merckx (BEL)	Faemino–Faema	37h 23' 27"
2	Luis Ocaña (ESP)	Bic	+ 2' 14"
3	Jan Janssen (NED)	Bic	+ 2' 24"
4	Raymond Poulidor (FRA)	Fagor–Mercier–Hutchinson	+ 3' 02"
5	Lucien Aimar (FRA)	Sonolor–Lejeune	+ 3' 55"
6	Cyrille Guimard (FRA)	Fagor–Mercier–Hutchinson	+ 4' 10"
7	Christian Raymond (FRA)	Peugeot–BP–Michelin	+ 4' 37"
8	Martin Van Den Bossche (BEL)	Molteni	+ 5' 21"
9	Gilbert Bellone (FRA)	Sonolor–Lejeune	+ 5' 39"
10	José Catieau (FRA)	Sonolor–Lejeune	+ 5' 40"
