= 1972 Scheldeprijs =

Race details
- Dates: 1 August 1972
- Stages: 1
- Distance: 224 km (139.2 mi)
- Winning time: 5h 31' 00"

Results
	Winner	Eddy Merckx (BEL)
	Second	Herman Van Springel (BEL)
	Third	Willy Planckaert (BEL)

The 1972 Scheldeprijs was the 59th edition of the Scheldeprijs cycle race and was held on 1 August 1972. The race was won by Eddy Merckx.

== General classification ==
Final general classification

Rank	Rider	Time
1	Eddy Merckx (BEL)	5h 31' 00"
2	Herman Van Springel (BEL)	+ 10"
3	Willy Planckaert (BEL)	+ 20"
4	Martin Van Den Bossche (BEL)	+ 20"
5	Gilbert Wuytack (BEL)	+ 20"
6	Walter Godefroot (BEL)	+ 20"
7	Ronald De Witte (BEL)	+ 35"
8	Jozef Abelshausen (BEL)	+ 45"
9	Jos van Beers (NED)	+ 45"
10	August Herijgers (BEL)	+ 45"
