= 1971 Giro di Lombardia =

Race details
- Dates: 9 October 1971
- Stages: 1
- Distance: 266 km (165.3 mi)
- Winning time: 6h 47' 54"

Results
	Winner	Eddy Merckx (BEL)	(Molteni)
	Second	Franco Bitossi (ITA)	(Filotex)
	Third	Frans Verbeeck (BEL)	(Watney–Avia)

The 1971 Giro di Lombardia was the 65th edition of the Giro di Lombardia cycle race and was held on 9 October 1971. The race started in Milan and finished in Como. The race was won by Eddy Merckx of the Molteni team.

== General classification ==
Final general classification

Rank	Rider	Team	Time
1	Eddy Merckx (BEL)	Molteni	6h 47' 54"
2	Franco Bitossi (ITA)	Filotex	+ 3' 31"
3	Frans Verbeeck (BEL)	Watney–Avia	+ 3' 33"
4	Antoine Houbrechts (BEL)	Salvarani	+ 3' 33"
5	Georges Pintens (BEL)	Hertekamp–Magniflex	+ 3' 33"
6	Enrico Maggioni (ITA)	Cosatto–Marsicano	+ 3' 33"
7	Italo Zilioli (ITA)	Ferretti	+ 3' 47"
8	Roger De Vlaeminck (BEL)	Flandria–Mars	+ 3' 49"
9	Felice Gimondi (ITA)	Salvarani	+ 3' 49"
10	Giancarlo Polidori (ITA)	Scic	+ 3' 49"
