= 1966 Milan–San Remo =

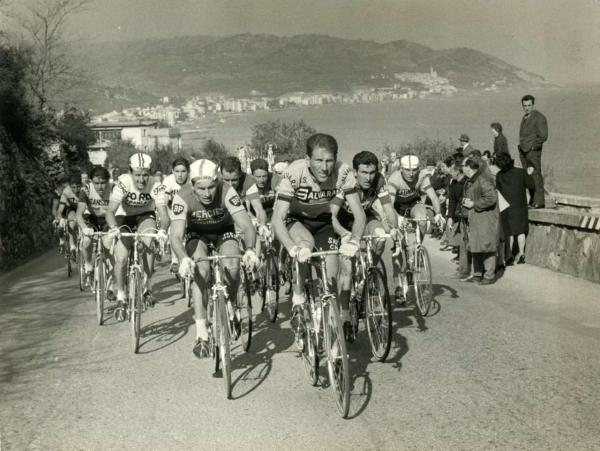
- Vittorio Adorni leads a group of chasers in Liguria

Race details
- Dates: March 20, 1966
- Stages: 1
- Distance: 290 km (180 mi)
- Winning time: 6h 40' 40"

Results
	Winner	Eddy Merckx (BEL)	(Peugeot–BP–Michelin)
	Second	Adriano Durante (ITA)	(Salvarani)
	Third	Herman Van Springel (BEL)	(Dr. Mann–Grundig)

The 57th running of the Milan–San Remo cycling classic was held on March 20, 1966. The race was won by 20-year old Belgian Eddy Merckx, the first of seven victories of the Cannibal in the monument race.

== Summary ==
After the Turchino, 17 riders were in the breakaway, but they were joined by a large peloton before the Poggio. Raymond Poulidor, looking for a second win, broke clear on the Poggio, but was caught before entering San Remo. A large group rushed to the finish on the Via Roma, with Italian champion Michele Dancelli leading out the sprint. Young Belgian Eddy Merckx, on his way to cycling legend, beat Italian Adriano Durante by centimeters, winning his first international classic. At 20, he became the youngest winner of the Classicissima ever. According to legend, his mother in Belgium fainted with emotion in front of the television.

== Results ==
	Rider	Team	Time
1	(Belgium) Eddy Merckx	Peugeot–BP–Michelin	6 h 40' 40"
2	(Italy) Adriano Durante	Salvarani	s.t.
3	(Belgium) Herman Van Springel	Dr. Mann–Grundig	s.t.
4	(Italy) Michele Dancelli	Molteni	s.t.
5	(Italy) Adriano Passuello	Legnano–Pirelli	s.t.
6	(Switzerland) Rolf Maurer	Filotex	s.t.
7	(France) Raymond Poulidor	Mercier–BP–Hutchinson	s.t.
8	(Italy) Franco Balmamion	Sanson	s.t.
9	(Netherlands) Hubertus Zilverberg	Televizier–Batavus	s.t.
10	(Italy) Roberto Poggiali	Bianchi–Mobylette	s.t.
