= 1970 La Flèche Wallonne =

Cycle race

Race details
- Dates: 19 April 1970
- Stages: 1
- Distance: 225 km (139.8 mi)
- Winning time: 5h 49' 00"

Results
	Winner	Eddy Merckx (BEL)	(Faemino–Faema)
	Second	Georges Pintens (BEL)	(Dr. Mann–Grundig)
	Third	Erik De Vlaeminck (BEL)	(Flandria–Mars)

The 1970 La Flèche Wallonne was the 34th edition of La Flèche Wallonne cycle race and was held on 19 April 1970. The race started in Liège and finished in Marcinelle. The race was won by Eddy Merckx of the Faemino–Faema team.

== General classification ==
Final general classification

Rank	Rider	Team	Time
1	Eddy Merckx (BEL)	Faemino–Faema	5h 49' 00"
2	Georges Pintens (BEL)	Dr. Mann–Grundig	+ 53"
3	Erik De Vlaeminck (BEL)	Flandria–Mars	+ 1' 06"
4	Roger Rosiers (BEL)	Bic	+ 1' 06"
5	Daniel Van Ryckeghem (BEL)		+ 1' 06"
6	Frans Verbeeck (BEL)	Geens–Watney	+ 1' 06"
7	Jan Krekels (NED)	Caballero–Laurens	+ 1' 06"
8	Jean-Pierre Monseré (BEL)	Flandria–Mars	+ 1' 06"
9	André Dierickx (BEL)	Flandria–Mars	+ 1' 06"
10	Raymond Poulidor (FRA)	Fagor–Mercier–Hutchinson	+ 1' 06"
