= GP Momignies =

Belgian cycling race

Race details
- Date: April, May, August, September, October
- Region: Hainaut Province, Wallonia (Belgium)
- English name: GP Momignies
- Local name: Grand Prix de Momignies (in French)
- Discipline: Road
- Competition: Cat. 1.2
- Type: One-day race

History
- First edition: 1945
- Editions: 10
- Final edition: 1990
- First winner: Joseph Somers (BEL)
- Most wins: Eddy Merckx (BEL); (2 wins)
- Final winner: Peter Roes (BEL)

The Grand Prix de Momignies was a Belgian cycling race, organized for the last time in 1990.

The starting and finish place of the race was in Momignies, located on the French border.

The competition's roll of honor includes the successes of Eddy Merckx and Willy Planckaert.

== Winners ==
| Year | Winner | Second | Third |
|---|---|---|---|
| 1945 | (Belgium) Joseph Somers | (Belgium) Frans Bonduel | (Belgium) Theo Pirmez |
| 1946 | (France) Jean Maye | (France) Raymond Louviot | (France) Maurice Alphonse Jules De Muer |
| 1947-70 | No race | | |
| 1971 | (Belgium) Dirk Baert | (Belgium) Jozef De Schoenmaecker | (Belgium) Ronny Vanmarcke |
| 1972 | (Belgium) Eddy Merckx | (Belgium) Dirk Baert | (Belgium) Georges Van Coningsloo |
| 1973 | (France) Alain Santy | (Belgium) Frans Verbeeck | (Belgium) Georges Van Coningsloo |
| 1974 | (Belgium) Eddy Merckx | (Belgium) Jean-Pierre Berckmans | (Belgium) Victor Van Schil |
| 1975 | (Belgium) Frans Verhaegen | (Belgium) Frans Mintjens | (Belgium) Paul Aerts |
| 1976 | (Belgium) Willy Planckaert | (Belgium) Jos Gysemans | (Belgium) Christian De Buysschère |
| 1977-78 | No race | | |
| 1979 | (Belgium) Ronny Vanmarcke | (Belgium) Frans Van Looy | (Belgium) Lieven Malfait |
| 1980-89 | No race | | |
| 1990 | (Belgium) Peter Roes | (Belgium) Dirk De Wolf | (Belgium) Michel Dernies |
