= 1970 Paris–Roubaix =

Race details
- Dates: 12 April 1970
- Stages: 1
- Distance: 266 km (165.3 mi)
- Winning time: 6h 23' 15"

Results
	Winner	Eddy Merckx (BEL)	(Faemino–Faema)
	Second	Roger De Vlaeminck (BEL)	(Flandria–Mars)
	Third	Eric Leman (BEL)	(Flandria–Mars)

The 1970 Paris–Roubaix was the 68th edition of the Paris–Roubaix cycle race and was held on 12 April 1970. The race started in Compiègne and finished in Roubaix. The race was won by Eddy Merckx of the Faemino–Faema team by over 5 minutes, the largest (post war) margin of victory in the race.

== General classification ==
Final general classification

Rank	Rider	Team	Time
1	Eddy Merckx (BEL)	Faemino–Faema	6h 23' 15"
2	Roger De Vlaeminck (BEL)	Flandria–Mars	+ 5' 21"
3	Eric Leman (BEL)	Flandria–Mars	+ 5' 29"
4	André Dierickx (BEL)	Flandria–Mars	+ 5' 29"
5	Walter Godefroot (BEL)	Salvarani	+ 7' 07"
6	Frans Verbeeck (BEL)	Geens–Watney	+ 7' 07"
7	Jan Janssen (NED)	Bic	+ 7' 07"
8	Roger Rosiers (BEL)	Bic	+ 7' 07"
9	Gerben Karstens (NED)	Peugeot–BP–Michelin	+ 8' 05"
10	Jean-Pierre Monseré (BEL)	Flandria–Mars	+ 8' 05"
