= 1966 Paris–Nice =

Race details
- Dates: 8–15 March 1966
- Stages: 8
- Distance: 1,312.4 km (815.5 mi)
- Winning time: 34h 02' 01"

Results
| Jersey awarded to the overall winner | Winner | Jacques Anquetil (FRA) | (Ford France–Hutchinson) |
| | Second | Raymond Poulidor (FRA) | (Mercier–BP–Hutchinson) |
| | Third | Vittorio Adorni (ITA) | (Salvarani) |

The 1966 Paris–Nice was the 24th edition of the Paris–Nice cycle race and was held from 8 March to 15 March 1966. The race started in Paris and finished in Nice. The race was won by Jacques Anquetil of the Ford France team.

== Route ==
Stage characteristics and winners
| Stage | Date | Course | Distance | Type | Winner |
|---|---|---|---|---|---|
| 1 | 8 March | Montereau to Auxerre | 143.2 km (89.0 mi) | | Adriano Durante (ITA) |
| 2a | 9 March | Avallon to Montceau-les-Mines | 141 km (88 mi) | | Vittorio Adorni (ITA) |
| 2b | 9 March | Montceau-les-Mines to Mâcon | 66.5 km (41.3 mi) | | Jean-Claude Annaert (FRA) |
| 3 | 10 March | Mâcon to Saint-Étienne | 175 km (109 mi) | | Rudi Altig (GER) |
| 4 | 11 March | Saint-Étienne to Bagnols-sur-Cèze | 205 km (127 mi) | | Rik Van Looy (BEL) |
| 5 | 12 March | Bagnols-sur-Cèze to Marignane | 157 km (98 mi) | | Albertus Geldermans (NED) |
| 6a | 13 March | Bastia to Bastia | 67 km (42 mi) | | Luciano Armani (ITA) |
| 6b | 13 March | Casta to L'Île-Rousse | 35.7 km (22.2 mi) | Individual time trial | Raymond Poulidor (FRA) |
| 7 | 14 March | L'Île-Rousse to Ajaccio | 155 km (96 mi) | | Michele Dancelli (ITA) |
| 8 | 15 March | Antibes to Nice | 167 km (104 mi) | | Jacques Anquetil (FRA) |

== General classification ==
Final general classification

| Rank | Rider | Team | Time |
|---|---|---|---|
| 1 | Jacques Anquetil (FRA) | Ford France–Hutchinson | 34h 02' 01" |
| 2 | Raymond Poulidor (FRA) | Mercier–BP–Hutchinson | + 48" |
| 3 | Vittorio Adorni (ITA) | Salvarani | + 1' 47" |
| 4 | Eddy Merckx (BEL) | Peugeot–BP–Michelin | + 2' 03" |
| 5 | Arie den Hartog (NED) | Ford France–Hutchinson | + 2' 41" |
| 6 | Rudi Altig (FRG) | Molteni | + 3' 10" |
| 7 | Paul Gutty (FRA) | Tigra | + 3' 46" |
| 8 | Désiré Letort (FRA) | Peugeot–BP–Michelin | + 4' 32" |
| 9 | Roger Milliot (FRA) | Pelforth–Sauvage–Lejeune | + 4' 52" |
| 10 | Arnaldo Pambianco (ITA) | Salvarani | + 6' 28" |
