= Emilio Casalini =

Italian cyclist

Personal information
- Born: 5 November 1941
- Died: 14 January 2024 (aged 82)

Cycling career
- Sport: Cycling
- Role: Rider

Emilio Casalini (5 November 1941 – 14 January 2024) was an Italian racing cyclist. He won stage 10 of the 1968 Giro d'Italia. In 1964 he won the Coppa Collecchio.
