= 1968 Paris–Tours =

Race details
- Dates: 6 October 1968
- Stages: 1
- Distance: 249 km (154.7 mi)
- Winning time: 5h 35' 40"

Results
	Winner	Guido Reybrouck (BEL)
	Second	Walter Godefroot (BEL)
	Third	Eric Leman (BEL)

The 1968 Paris–Tours was the 62nd edition of the Paris–Tours cycle race and was held on 6 October 1968. The race started in Paris and finished in Tours. The race was won by Guido Reybrouck.

== General classification ==
Final general classification

Rank	Rider	Time
1	Guido Reybrouck (BEL)	5h 35' 40"
2	Walter Godefroot (BEL)	+ 0"
3	Eric Leman (BEL)	+ 0"
4	Rik Van Looy (BEL)	+ 0"
5	Daniel Van Ryckeghem (BEL)	+ 0"
6	Harry Steevens (NED)	+ 0"
7	Noël Foré (BEL)	+ 0"
8	Eddy Merckx (BEL)	+ 0"
9	Paul Lemeteyer (FRA)	+ 0"
10	Jacques Guiot (FRA)	+ 0"
