= 1968 Tirreno–Adriatico =

Race details
- Dates: 12–16 March 1968
- Stages: 5
- Distance: 1,037.9 km (644.9 mi)
- Winning time: 27h 17' 32"

Results
	Winner	Claudio Michelotto (ITA)
	Second	Italo Zilioli (ITA)
	Third	Rudi Altig (FRG)

The 1968 Tirreno–Adriatico was the third edition of the Tirreno–Adriatico cycle race and was held from 12 March to 16 March 1968. The race started in Santa Marinella and finished in San Benedetto del Tronto. The race was won by Claudio Michelotto.

== General classification ==
Final general classification

Rank	Rider	Time
1	Claudio Michelotto (ITA)	27h 17' 32"
2	Italo Zilioli (ITA)	+ 18"
3	Rudi Altig (FRG)	+ 1' 38"
4	Franco Bitossi (ITA)	+ 1' 39"
5	Vito Taccone (ITA)	+ 1' 43"
6	Roberto Ballini (ITA)	+ 1' 43"
7	Flavio Vicentini (ITA)	+ 1' 45"
8	Gianni Motta (ITA)	+ 1' 47"
9	Michele Dancelli (ITA)	+ 1' 53"
10	Felice Gimondi (ITA)	+ 2' 17"
