= 1968 Paris–Nice =

Race details
- Dates: 7–15 March 1968
- Stages: 8 + Prologue
- Distance: 1,453.2 km (903.0 mi)
- Winning time: 34h 42' 21"

Results
Jersey awarded to the overall winner	Winner	Rolf Wolfshohl (FRG)	(Bic)
	Second	Ferdinand Bracke (BEL)	(Peugeot–BP–Michelin)
	Third	Jean-Louis Bodin (FRA)	(Frimatic–Wolber–de Gribaldy)

The 1968 Paris–Nice was the 26th edition of the Paris–Nice cycle race and was held from 7 March to 15 March 1968. The race started in Paris and finished in Nice. The race was won by Rolf Wolfshohl of the Bic team.

== General classification ==
Final general classification

Rank	Rider	Team	Time
1	Rolf Wolfshohl (FRG)	Bic	34h 42' 21"
2	Ferdinand Bracke (BEL)	Peugeot–BP–Michelin	+ 2' 58"
3	Jean-Louis Bodin (FRA)	Frimatic–Wolber–de Gribaldy	+ 5' 12"
4	Bernard Guyot (FRA)	Pelforth–Sauvage–Lejeune	+ 5' 40"
5	Jan Janssen (NED)	Pelforth–Sauvage–Lejeune	+ 6' 08"
6	Charly Grosskost (FRA)	Bic	+ 6' 22"
7	Lucien Aimar (FRA)	Bic	+ 7' 07"
8	Antoine Houbrechts (BEL)	Flandria–De Clerck	+ 7' 26"
9	Gilbert Bellone (FRA)	Mercier–BP–Hutchinson	+ 7' 53"
10	Jacques Anquetil (FRA)	Bic	+ 8' 09"
