= 1968 Giro d'Italia =

Race details
- Dates: 20 May - 12 June 1968
- Stages: 22 + Prologue
- Distance: 3,917.3 km (2,434.1 mi)
- Winning time: 108h 42' 27"

Results
Jersey awarded to the overall winner	Winner	Eddy Merckx (BEL)	(Faema)
	Second	Vittorio Adorni (ITA)	(Faema)
	Third	Felice Gimondi (ITA)	(Salvarani)
Jersey awarded to the points classification winner	Points	Eddy Merckx (BEL)	(Faema)
	Mountains	Eddy Merckx (BEL)	(Faema)
	Team	Faema	

The 1968 Giro d'Italia was the 51st running of the Giro d'Italia, one of cycling's Grand Tour races. The Giro started in Campione d'Italia, on 20 May, with a 5.7 km (3.5 mi) stage and concluded in Naples, on 11 June, with a 235 km (146.0 mi) mass-start stage. A total of 130 riders from 13 teams entered the 22-stage race, which was won by Belgian Eddy Merckx of the Faema team. The second and third places were taken by Italians Vittorio Adorni and Felice Gimondi, respectively.

== Teams ==
At the route's announcement on 21 March, the organizers announced twelve teams of ten would participate; however, one more team (Peugeot) was later invited. Each team sent a squad of ten riders so the Giro began with a peloton of 130 cyclists. Out of the 130 riders that started this edition of the Giro d'Italia, a total of 98 riders made it to the finish in Naples where eight riders were subsequently disqualified for testing positive for drugs leaving the general classification tally at 90 riders. The starting peloton consisted of 70 Italians, 16 Belgians, 15 Frenchmen, 11 Spanish, 7 Swiss, four Germans, three Dutch, two Danes, one English, and one Luxembourgian rider. The presentation of the teams – where each team's roster and manager were introduced in front the media and local dignitaries – took place on 20 May, in the Campione d'Italia at 9:30 AM local time.

The teams entering the race were:

- Bic
- Faema
- Fagor–Fargas
- Filotex
- G.B.C.
- Germanvox–Wega
- Kelvinator
- Max Meyer
- Molteni
- Pepsi–Cola
- Peugeot–BP–Michelin
- Salvarani
- Smith's

== Pre-race favorites ==
The starting peloton did include the previous year's winner Felice Gimondi. Eddy Merckx was confirmed to participate with his Faema team. Eight-time Grand Tour winner Jacques Anquetil did not participate in the race because of a dispute over pay.

== Route and stages ==
The race route was revealed to the public on 21 March 1968 by race director Vincenzo Torriani. The starting date of the event was moved from 18 or 19 May to the 20th because of the general election taking place within Italy that ended on 19 May. The race was broadcast by RAI throughout Italy. l'Unita writer Gino Sala's felt the route was geared towards climbers, referencing the inclusion of Tre Cime di Lavaredo which had been the previous year and eliminated several riders. Former racer Cino Cinelli felt the Tre Cime di Lavaredo would be the decisive stage, while three-time champion Gino Bartali felt the Spanish would benefit from the route. The average length of the stages was 178 km (111 mi). The second individual time trial, in San Marino, was seen as an important stage as it featured inclines of 5-6%. Gianni Motta commented that "I've never seen so many mountains in a row one after another." Four mountains approached or exceeded 2,000 m (6,562 ft): Monte Grappa, Tre Cime di Lavaredo, Rocca di Cambio, and Blockhaus. Following the route's unveil, El Mundo Deportivo author Juan Plans Bosch wrote that the Giro would always be second to the Tour de France as it was the first premier bike race, while he felt the Giro had better "historical and geographical illustrations."

To begin race festivities there was a parade through the streets of Campione d'Italia before the prologue started during the night. The race started with a 5.7 km (4 mi) prologue, which consisted of a 2.875 km (2 mi) circuit being crossed twice. The times from this stage were not included in the final times for the general classification, but were just done to determine the first person to wear the race leader's maglia rosa (English: pink jersey). This was the first Giro d'Italia to have a prologue to open the race. The 130 starting riders were divided into thirteen groups of ten, with each group of ten contesting the course at the same time. The times of the fastest riders from each group were put together and the fastest of those times was the rider that would wear the first pink jersey. The route finished for the first time in Naples near Mount Vesuvius along the Mediterranean Ocean.

Stage characteristics and winners
Stage	Date	Course	Distance	Type	Winner
P	20 May	Campione d'Italia	5.7 km (4 mi)	Individual time trial	Charly Grosskost (FRA) (Note: The times from the prologue did not count towards the general classification, but were used to determine what rider would wear the race leader's maglia rosa on the first stage of the race.)
1	21 May	Campione d'Italia to Novara	128 km (80 mi)	Plain stage	Eddy Merckx (BEL)
2	22 May	Novara to Saint-Vincent	189 km (117 mi)	Stage with mountain(s)	Eddy Merckx (BEL) (Note: The original stage winner, Gianna Motta, was found to have used performance enhancing drugs and his results were subsequently voided.)
3	23 May	Saint-Vincent to Alba	168 km (104 mi)	Plain stage	Guido Reybrouck (BEL)
4	24 May	Alba to Sanremo	162 km (101 mi)	Stage with mountain(s)	Ward Sels (BEL)
5	25 May	Sanremo to Sanremo	149 km (93 mi)	Stage with mountain(s)	Italo Zilioli (ITA)
6	26 May	Sanremo to Alessandria	223 km (139 mi)	Stage with mountain(s)	José Antonio Momeñe (ESP)
7	27 May	Alessandria to Piacenza	174 km (108 mi)	Stage with mountain(s)	Guerrino Tosello (ITA)
8	28 May	San Giorgio Piacentino to Brescia	225 km (140 mi)	Stage with mountain(s)	Eddy Merckx (BEL)
9	29 May	Brescia to Lido di Caldonazzo	210 km (130 mi)	Stage with mountain(s)	Julio Jiménez (ESP)
10	30 May	Trento to Monte Grappa	136 km (85 mi)	Stage with mountain(s)	Emilio Casalini (ITA)
11	31 May	Bassano del Grappa to Trieste	197 km (122 mi)	Plain stage	Guido Reybrouck (BEL)
12	1 June	Gorizia to Tre Cime di Lavaredo	213 km (132 mi)	Stage with mountain(s)	Eddy Merckx (BEL)
13	2 June	Cortina d'Ampezzo to Vittorio Veneto	163 km (101 mi)	Stage with mountain(s)	Lino Farisato (ITA)
14	3 June	Vittorio Veneto to Marina Romea	199 km (124 mi)	Plain stage	Luigi Sgarbozza (ITA)
15	4 June	Ravenna to Imola	141 km (88 mi)	Plain stage	Marino Basso (ITA)
	5 June	Rest day			
16	6 June	Cesenatico to City of San Marino (San Marino)	49.3 km (31 mi)	Individual time trial	Felice Gimondi (ITA)
17	7 June	City of San Marino (San Marino) to Foligno	196 km (122 mi)	Plain stage	Franco Bitossi (ITA)
18	8 June	Foligno to Abbadia San Salvatore	166 km (103 mi)	Stage with mountain(s)	Julio Jiménez (ESP)
19	9 June	Abbadia San Salvatore to Rome	181 km (112 mi)	Plain stage	Luciano Dalla Bona (ITA)
20	10 June	Rome to Rocca di Cambio	215 km (134 mi)	Stage with mountain(s)	Luis Pedro Santamarina (ESP)
21	11 June	Rocca di Cambio to Blockhaus	198 km (123 mi)	Stage with mountain(s)	Franco Bitossi (ITA) (Note: The original stage winner, Franco Bodrero, was found to have used performance enhancing drugs and his results were subsequently voided.)
22	12 June	Chieti to Naples	235 km (146 mi)	Plain stage	Guido Reybrouck (BEL)
	Total		3,917.3 km (2,434 mi)		

== Race overview ==
The race's twelfth stage saw heavy rain from the start of the stage in Gorizia, which turned to snow as the race began to elevate into the Dolomites. Police lined the sides of the roads of the Tre Cime di Lavaredo as the riders passed through due to incidents that had occurred on the slopes the previous year. The leading group on the road had a ten-minute advantage on Eddy Merckx. Merckx was able to traverse the ten-minute gap, win the stage, and take the lead of the race.

=== Doping ===
At a presentation in Campione d'Italia, Torriani announced the measures for doping controls. This was the first Giro d'Italia to administer tests in attempt to catch riders doping, To determine whether a not tests would be administered, a set of twenty-two envelopes were made with each envelope having a slip of paper inside that read either "Yes" or "No". Following the finish of each stage one envelope was opened, if it read "No," then all riders could leave immediately. If it read "Yes," then riders with high placings on the stage and in the overall classification were tested. The results from these tests, however, would be available fifteen days after the conclusion of the race. On 15 June, the Italian Cycling Federation announced that nine riders had tested positive during the race. The riders were Gimondi, Motta, Franco Balmamion, Franco Bodrero, Raymond Delise, Peter Abt, Victor van Schil, Mariano Diaz, Joaquin Galera. Balmamion was cleared of the charges as the substance found in his urine had not been officially banned. Gimondi's ban was overturned on 13 July as he persuaded the authorities he had used Reactivan. Years later, author John Foot wrote "Doubts remain about how much the influence of Gimondi's fame and his ability to employ expensive lawyers and experts had on his case," casting further doubt on the legitimacy of Gimondi's claims of innocence. The Tour de France organizers adopted the Giro's doping control scheme for their 1968 race.

== Classification Leadership ==
Two different leader's jerseys were worn during the 1968 Giro d'Italia. The leader of the general classification – calculated by adding the stage finish times of each rider – wore a pink jersey. This classification is the most important of the race, and its winner is considered as the winner of the Giro. There were no time bonuses in 1968.

For the points classification, which awarded a red jersey to its leader, cyclists were given points for finishing a stage in the top 15.

A major secondary classification was the mountains classification. In this ranking, points were won by reaching the summit of a climb ahead of other cyclists. There were a total of nineteen categorized climbs, of which the highest one, the Cima Coppi, was the Tre Cime di Lavaredo.

There was also an intermediate sprints classification. Stages had one or two sprints, and the first two riders to reach these sprints scored 30 and 10 points.

Another secondary classification was the secret sprint (or surprise sprint) classification. Each stage (excluding time trials) had a midway sprint, whose location was not shared.

Although no jersey was awarded, there was also one classification for the teams. Here riders scored points for their teams for a high stage finish, leading the general classification, or begin amongst the first riders at a mountain pass or intermediate sprint.

Classification leadership by stage
Stage	Winner	General classification	Points classification	Mountains classification	Intermediate sprints classification	Secret sprints classification	Team classification
P	Charly Grosskost	(Charly Grosskost)	not awarded	not awarded	not awarded	not awarded	
1	Eddy Merckx	Eddy Merckx	Eddy Merckx	not awarded	Adriano Durante	Italo Zilioli	Faema
2	Eddy Merckx	Eddy Merckx	Eddy Merckx	Julio Jiménez	multiple riders	multiple riders	Faema
3	Guido Reybrouck	Michele Dancelli	Eddy Merckx	Julio Jiménez	multiple riders	multiple riders	Faema
4	Ward Sels	Michele Dancelli	Guido Reybrouck	Julio Jiménez	multiple riders	Pietro Campagnari	Faema
5	Italo Zilioli	Michele Dancelli	Guido Reybrouck	Julio Jiménez & Eddy Merckx	multiple riders	Pietro Campagnari	Faema
6	José Antonio Momeñe	Michele Dancelli	Eddy Merckx	Julio Jiménez & Eddy Merckx	multiple riders	Pietro Campagnari	Faema
7	Guerrino Tosello	Michele Dancelli	Eddy Merckx	Mariano Díaz	multiple riders	Pietro Campagnari	Faema
8	Eddy Merckx	Michele Dancelli	Eddy Merckx	Mariano Díaz	Claudio Michelotto	Pietro Campagnari	Faema
9	Julio Jiménez	Michele Dancelli	Eddy Merckx	Julio Jiménez	Claudio Michelotto	Pietro Campagnari	Faema
10	Emilio Casalini	Michele Dancelli	Eddy Merckx	Julio Jiménez	Claudio Michelotto	Pietro Campagnari	Faema
11	Guido Reybrouck	Michele Dancelli	Eddy Merckx	Julio Jiménez	Claudio Michelotto	Pietro Campagnari	Faema
12	Eddy Merckx	Eddy Merckx	Eddy Merckx	Eddy Merckx	Mario Anni	Pietro Campagnari	Faema
13	Lino Farisato	Eddy Merckx	Eddy Merckx	Eddy Merckx	Mario Anni	Pietro Campagnari	Faema
14	Luigi Sgarbozza	Eddy Merckx	Eddy Merckx	Eddy Merckx	Mario Anni	Pietro Campagnari	Faema
15	Marino Basso	Eddy Merckx	Eddy Merckx	Eddy Merckx	multiple riders	multiple riders	Faema
16	Felice Gimondi	Eddy Merckx	Eddy Merckx	Eddy Merckx	multiple riders	multiple riders	Faema
17	Franco Bitossi	Eddy Merckx	Eddy Merckx	Eddy Merckx	multiple riders	Marino Basso	Faema
18	Julio Jiménez	Eddy Merckx	Eddy Merckx	Eddy Merckx	multiple riders	Marino Basso	Faema
19	Luciano Dalla Bona	Eddy Merckx	Eddy Merckx	Eddy Merckx	multiple riders	Marino Basso	Faema
20	Luis Pedro Santamarina	Eddy Merckx	Eddy Merckx	Eddy Merckx	multiple riders	Marino Basso	Faema
21	Franco Bitossi	Eddy Merckx	Eddy Merckx	Eddy Merckx	Franco Bitossi	Marino Basso	Faema
22	Guido Reybrouck	Eddy Merckx	Eddy Merckx	Eddy Merckx	Franco Bitossi	Marino Basso	Faema
Final		Eddy Merckx	Eddy Merckx	Eddy Merckx	Franco Bitossi	Marino Basso	Faema

== Final standings ==
Legend
Pink jersey	Denotes the winner of the General classification
Red jersey	Denotes the winner of the Points classification

=== General classification ===
Final general classification (1–10)
Rank	Name	Team	Time
1	Eddy Merckx (BEL)	Faema	108h 42' 27"
2	Vittorio Adorni (ITA)	Faema	+ 5' 01"
3	Felice Gimondi (ITA)	Salvarani	+ 9' 05"
4	Italo Zilioli (ITA)	Filotex	+ 9' 17"
5	Willy Van Neste (BEL)	Bic	+ 10' 43"
DSQ	~~Gianni Motta (ITA)~~	~~Molteni~~	~~+ 12' 23"~~
6	Michele Dancelli (ITA)	Pepsi Cola	+ 12' 33"
7	Franco Balmamion (ITA)	Molteni	+ 15' 43"
8	Francisco Gabica (ESP)	Fagor	+ 16' 59"
9	Franco Bitossi (ITA)	Filotex	+ 19' 02"
10	Julio Jiménez (ESP)	Bic	+ 19' 51"

=== Points classification ===
Final points classification (1–5)
	Name	Team	Points
1	Eddy Merckx (BEL)	Faema	198
2	Franco Bitossi (ITA)	Filotex	138
3	Michele Dancelli (ITA)	Pepsi Cola	132
DSQ	~~Gianni Motta (ITA)~~	~~Molteni~~	~~122~~
4	Marino Basso (ITA)	Molteni	122
5	Guido Reybrouck (BEL)	Faema	115
6	Felice Gimondi (ITA)	Salvarani	96
7	Vittorio Adorni (ITA)	Faema	88
8	Italo Zilioli (ITA)	Filotex	73
9	Julio Jiménez (ESP)	Bic	73
10	Vito Taccone (ITA)	Germanvox	60

=== Mountains classification ===
Final mountains classification (1–6)
	Name	Team	Points
1	Eddy Merckx (BEL)	Faema	340
DSQ	~~Mariano Díaz (ESP)~~	~~Fagor~~	210
3	Julio Jiménez (ESP)	Bic	180
4	Giancarlo Polidori (ITA)	Pepsi Cola	140
4	Joaquín Galera (ESP)	Fagor	140
6	Franco Bitossi (ITA)	Filotex	90

=== Traguardi a sorpresa classification ===
Final traguardia a sorpresa classification (1–10)
	Name	Team	Points
1	Marino Basso (ITA)	Molteni	22
2	Roberto Ballini (ITA)	Max Meyer	15
3	Pietro Campagnari (ITA)	Molteni	14
4	Luciano Armani (ITA)	Faema	13
5	Giancarlo Polidori (ITA)	Pepsi Cola	10
6	Julio Jiménez (ESP)	Bic	8
6	Luis Santamarina (ESP)	Fagor	8
6	Franco Bitossi (ITA)	Filotex	8
9	Giuseppe Milioli (ITA)	Germanvox-Vega	6
10	Italo Zilioli (ITA)	Filotex	5
10	Rem Stefanoni (ITA)	Max Meyer	5
10	~~Mariano Díaz (ESP)~~	~~Fagor~~	5
10	Lino Farisato (ITA)	Faema	5
10	Raymond Delisle (FRA)		5
10	Claudio Michelotto (ITA)	Max Meyer	5
10	Daminiano Capodivento (ITA)	G.B.C.	5
10	Georges Vandenberghe (BEL)	Smith's	5

=== Team classification ===
Final team classification (1–10)
	Team	Points
1	Faema	?
2	Molteni	?
3	Fagor-Fargas	?
4	Pepsi Cola	?
5	Filotex	?
6	Bic	?
7	Salvarani	?
8	Max Meyer	?
9	Germanvox-Vega	?
10	Smith's	?

=== Minor classifications ===
Franco Bitossi (Filotex) won the traguardi tricolori classification and Merckx won the Trofeo dei Circuiti.
