= Paris–Luxembourg =

Former stage race held between 1963 and 1970

Race details
- Date: August–September
- Region: France, Luxembourg
- English name: Paris–Luxembourg
- Local name: Paris–Luxembourg (in French)
- Discipline: Road
- Competition: Super Prestige Pernod Competition
- Type: Stage race

History
- First edition: 1963
- Editions: 8
- Final edition: 1970
- First winner: Rudi Altig (GER)
- Final winner: Eric de Vlaeminck (BEL)

The Paris–Luxembourg was a professional cycle race held as a stage race between Paris and Luxembourg.

== Winners ==
The winners from 1963 through 1970 were:

Year	Country	Rider	Team
1963	West Germany	Rudi Altig	
1964	Belgium	Rik Van Looy	
1965	France	Jean Stablinski	
1966	France	Anatole Novak	
1967	Netherlands	Jan Janssen	
1968	Italy	Michele Dancelli	
1969	Belgium	Eddy Merckx	
1970	Belgium	Erik De Vlaeminck	
