= Giro di Sardegna =

Cycling race

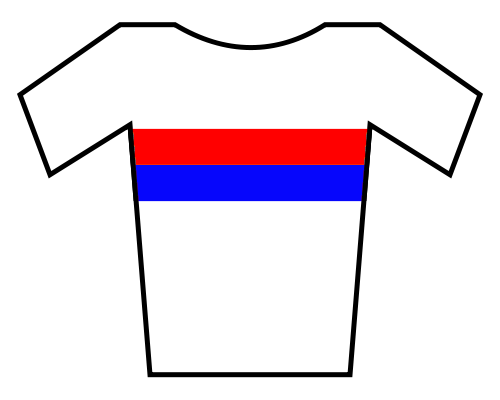
- Winner's jersey

Race details
- Date: Late-February
- Region: Sardinia, Italy
- English name: Tour of Sardinia
- Local name: Giro di Sardegna (in Italian)
- Discipline: Road race
- Competition: UCI Europe Tour
- Type: Stage race

History
- First edition: 1958
- Editions: 30 (as of 2026)
- First winner: Antonin Rolland (FRA)
- Most wins: Eddy Merckx (BEL) (4 wins)
- Most recent: Filippo Zana (ITA)

Giro di Sardegna (Tour of Sardinia) is a stage road bicycle race held on the island of Sardinia, an Italian region. It was rated 2.1 on the UCI Europe Tour. The race returned in 2009 after eleven years, but only lasted a further three editions before being cancelled due to budgetary problems in 2012. The race was revived in the autumn of 2025 and there was a thirtieth edition in February 2026.

== Winners of the Races ==
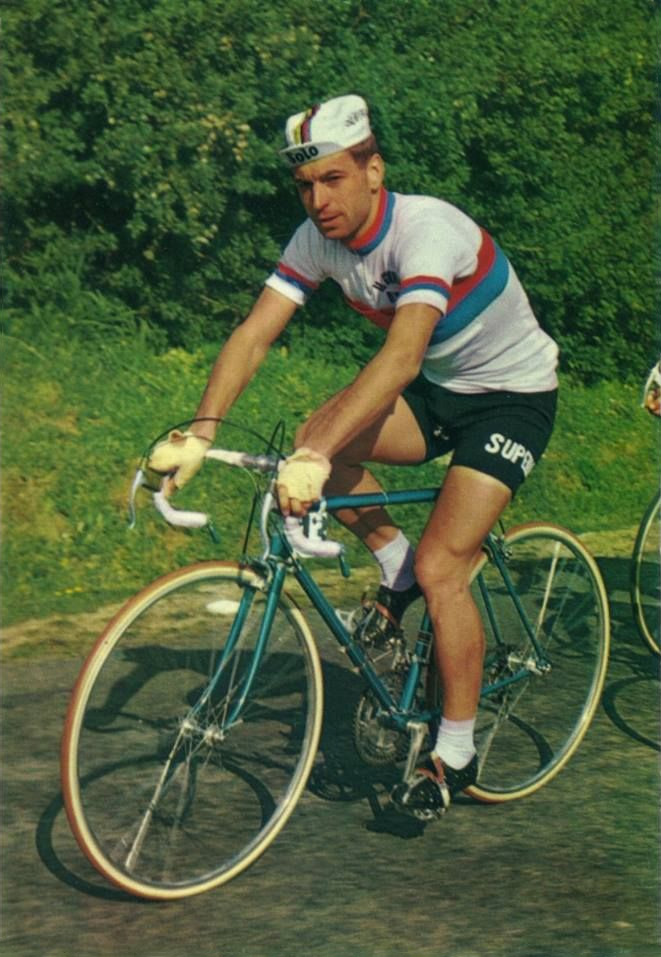
Rik Van Looy wearing the leader's jersey in 1965

Year	Country	Rider	Team
1958	France	Antonin Rolland	L. Bobet–BP–Hutchinson
1959	Belgium	Rik Van Looy	Faema–Guerra
1960	Netherlands	Jo de Roo	Helyett–Fynsec–Leroux
1961	Belgium	Emile Daems	Philco
1962	Belgium	Rik Van Looy	Flandria–Faema–Clément
1963	Italy	Arnaldo Pambianco	Salvarani
1964	Italy	Vittorio Adorni	Salvarani
1965	Belgium	Rik Van Looy	Solo–Superia
1966	France	Jacques Anquetil	Ford France–Geminiani
1967	Italy	Luciano Armani	Salamini–Luxor
1968	Belgium	Eddy Merckx	Faema
1969	Italy	Claudio Michelotto	Max Meyer
1970	Belgium	Patrick Sercu	Dreher
1971	Belgium	Eddy Merckx	Molteni
1972	Italy	Marino Basso	Salvarani
1973	Belgium	Eddy Merckx	Molteni
1974	Belgium	Rik Van Linden	IJsboerke–Colner
1975	Belgium	Eddy Merckx	Molteni
1976	Belgium	Roger De Vlaeminck	Brooklyn
1977	Belgium	Freddy Maertens	Flandria–Velda–Latina Assicurazioni
1978	Norway	Knut Knudsen	Bianchi–Faema
1979	No race		
1980	West Germany	Gregor Braun	Sanson
1981	No race		
1982	Italy	Giuseppe Saronni	Del Tongo
1983	West Germany	Gregor Braun	Vivi–Benotto
1984–1995	No race		
1996	Italy	Gabriele Colombo	Gewiss Playbus
1997	Italy	Roberto Petito	Saeco–Estro
1998–2008	No race		
2009	Italy	Daniele Bennati	Liquigas
2010	Czech Republic	Roman Kreuziger	Liquigas–Doimo
2011	Slovakia	Peter Sagan	Liquigas–Cannondale
2012–2025	No race		
2026	Italy	Filippo Zana	Soudal–Quick-Step
