= 1972 Giro d'Italia =

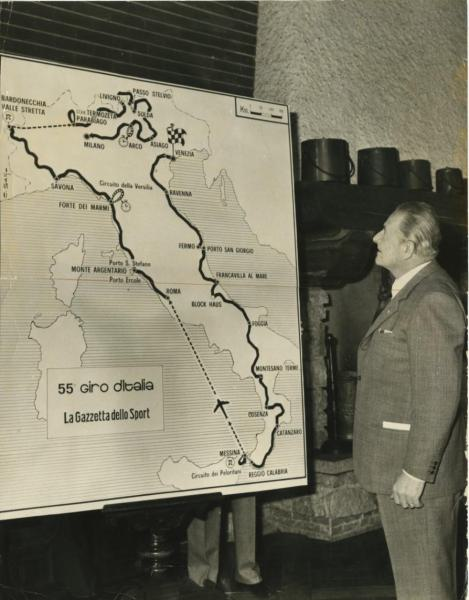
- Alfredo Binda looks at the route of the 1972 Giro d'Italia

Race details
- Dates: 21 May – 11 June 1972
- Stages: 20, including three split stages
- Distance: 3,725 km (2,315 mi)
- Winning time: 103h 04' 04"

Results
| Jersey awarded to the overall winner | Winner | Eddy Merckx (BEL) | (Molteni) |
| | Second | José Manuel Fuente (ESP) | (KAS) |
| | Third | Francisco Galdós (ESP) | (KAS) |
| Jersey awarded to the points classification winner | Points | Roger De Vlaeminck (BEL) | (Dreher) |
| | Mountains | José Manuel Fuente (ESP) | (KAS) |
| | Combination | Eddy Merckx (BEL) | (Molteni) |
| | Team | Molteni | |

The 1972 Giro d'Italia was the 55th running of the Giro, one of cycling's Grand Tours. It started in Venice on 21 May, with a 5.2 km (3.2 mi) prologue and concluded with a 197 km (122 mi) mass-start stage, on 11 June. A total of 100 riders from ten teams entered the 20-stage race, that was won by Belgian Eddy Merckx of the Molteni team. The second and third places were taken by Spaniards José Manuel Fuente and Francisco Galdós, respectively.

== Teams ==
A total of ten teams were invited to participate in the 1972 Giro d'Italia. Each team sent a squad of ten riders, which meant that the race started with a peloton of 100 cyclists. In total, 63 riders were from Italy, while the remaining 37 riders came from: Belgium (18), Spain (10), Switzerland (6), Sweden (2), and Denmark (1). Of those starting, 21 were riding the Giro d'Italia for the first time. The average age of riders was 27.34 years, ranging from 22–year–old Jürg Schneider from GBC to 38–year–old Aldo Moser of GBC. The team with the youngest average rider age was Magniflex (25), while the oldest was Salvarani (29). From the riders that began this edition, 69 made it to the finish on the Milan.

The teams entering the race were:

- Dreher
- Ferretti
- Filotex
- G.B.C.-Sony
- KAS
- Magniflex
- Molteni
- Salvarani
- Scic
- Zonca

== Pre-race favorites ==
Eddy Merckx (Molteni) entered as the unanimous favorite to win the event. He had previously won the race in 1968 and 1970, but did not ride in 1971 in order to race the Tour de France, which he won. Early in the season, he broke a vertebra in a fall during the Paris–Nice. Merckx entered the race as the reigning world champion, with victories at Milan–San Remo and Liège–Bastogne–Liège in the season so far. He was viewed to be in great physical shape coming into the race. Despite his success, there were concerns that Merckx's constant racing during the 1969 and 1970 seasons might have diminished his capabilities. The Molteni team was viewed to have strong supports for Merckx with Roger Swerts, Martin Van Den Bossche, and Jozef Spruyt. It was known that Merckx wished to target the upcoming Tour de France and it was thought that he and his team would try to be conservative with their efforts at the Giro. A third victory would tie Merckx with the likes of Giovanni Brunero, Gino Bartali, and Fiorenzo Magni, whom each had won the race three times. Five-time champion Alfredo Binda commented that Merckx's participation "promises episodes of high competitive value, even if the Belgian is no longer the powerful athlete, almost irresistible from two years ago." Binda commented that Merckx is vulnerable when considering his results from the previous season to the current one.

Reigning champion Gösta Pettersson (Ferretti) was found to be a dangerous opponent. Pettersson's teammate Gianni Motta was also viewed as a general classification threat, which was thought to hinder their chances as Merckx was the sole leader of his Molteni team. The same was thought for the Salvarani team which featured two-time winner Felice Gimondi (1967 and 1969) and Italo Zilioli. Gimondi stated before the race that on the fourth stage where the Blockhaus is climbed, "you will know what I am worth." Binda felt Gimondi had the best chance of all the Italian competitors to win the general classification. Spanish climbers José Manuel Fuente and Miguel María Lasa, both from the KAS team, were expected to disrupt Merckx in the mountains and could challenge for a high general classification ranking. The KAS team was viewed as a strong squad after their stranglehold over the recent Vuelta a España where Fuente was victorious, but it was noted that featured minimal competition for the squad.

Outside contenders for the race were Roger De Vlaeminck (Dreher), Ole Ritter (Dreher), Pierfranco Vianelli (Dreher), and Franco Bitossi (Filotex). De Vlaeminck was viewed as a threat due to his victory at Paris–Roubaix and stage-race Tirreno–Adriatico. He suffered scaphoid fracture before the race and got the cast removed before the race began and started the event with a bandage on his left wrist. He stated he hoped his condition would improve before the race reached the Blockhaus. In addition, one of de Vlaeminck's knees would be operated on in the fall.

Sprinters Marino Basso (Salvarani) and Patrick Sercu (Dreher) were thought to be the favorites to win the opening flat stages. Notable absences from the race included Rik Van Linden (Magniflex) who had injured his foot in the Vuelta.

== Route and stages ==
Race director Vincenzo Torriani revealed the race route on 28 March 1972 in front of several journalists. Torriani reported that Belgium had expressed interest in hosting the start of the race with a cash incentive, but arrived late in the process and would be considered for the 1973 edition. After the routes announcement in March, it was modified and contained twenty days of racing, with three split stages, which covered a grand total of 3,716 km (2,309 mi), which was reduced from the 3,794 km (2,357 mi) initially. The race featured two rest days, the first of which was used to transfer from Messina to Rome on 30 May. There were eleven stages containing seventeen categorized climbs that awarded points for the mountains classification across eleven stages. In total, the race climbed 24.3 km (15.1 mi), 3.4 km (2.1 mi) less than the previous year. The average length of each stage was 185.8 km (115.5 mi). The route contained three time trial stages for a total of 58 km (36 mi). One of the days featured two time trials each in Forte dei Marmi, where Torriani pitched the idea that there could be three winners on the stage, one for each winner of the split time trial stage and one winner for the best combined time from both performances, but in the end it counted as two stages, each with points for the points classification. At the initial route announcement there was speculation that a prologue would take place on 20 May in Venice, but it was later reported to have failed because Torriani did not get approval from the Venetian government.

The route began in Venice for the first time in race history and traveled south and crossed the Apennines until reaching the edge of the continental section of Italy. The race transferred to Sicily for a stage. Following the conclusion of Messina stage, the race had a rest day that was used to transfer for Rome. The event continued north and reached the Alps before reaching the Alps and making a turn south and west to travel towards Milan for the finish. The entire route crossed through the majority of Italian regions.

It was believed Torriani made the race very mountainous in order to keep Merckx from overly dominating the race. Author William Fotheringham shared that sentiment, specifically stating that Torriani designed the route in order to give José Manuel Fuente several opportunities to attack Eddy Merckx. The race was predicted to be under poor weather for the majority of its duration.

Stage characteristics and results
| Stage | Date | Course | Distance | Type | Winner |
|---|---|---|---|---|---|
| 1 | 21 May | Venice to Ravenna | 196 km (122 mi) | Plain stage | Marino Basso (ITA) |
| 2 | 22 May | Ravenna to Fermo | 212 km (132 mi) | Stage with mountain(s) | Gianni Motta (ITA) |
| 3 | 23 May | Porto San Giorgio to Francavilla al Mare | 205 km (127 mi) | Plain stage | Ugo Colombo (ITA) |
| 4a | 24 May | Francavilla al Mare to Blockhaus | 48 km (30 mi) | Stage with mountain(s) | José Manuel Fuente (ESP) |
| 4b | 24 May | Blockhaus to Foggia | 210 km (130 mi) | Plain stage | Wilmo Francioni (ITA) |
| 5 | 25 May | Foggia to Montesano sulla Marcellana | 238 km (148 mi) | Stage with mountain(s) | Fabrizio Fabbri (ITA) |
| 6 | 26 May | Montesano sulla Marcellana to Cosenza | 190 km (118 mi) | Stage with mountain(s) | Roger De Vlaeminck (BEL) |
| 7 | 27 May | Cosenza to Catanzaro | 151 km (94 mi) | Stage with mountain(s) | Gösta Pettersson (SWE) |
| 8 | 28 May | Catanzaro to Reggio Calabria | 160 km (99 mi) | Plain stage | Attilio Benfatto (ITA) |
| 9 | 29 May | Messina to Messina | 110 km (68 mi) | Plain stage | Albert Van Vlierberghe (BEL) |
| | 30 May | Rest day | | | |
| 10 | 31 May | Rome to Monte Argentario | 166 km (103 mi) | Plain stage | Italo Zilioli (ITA) |
| 11 | 1 June | Monte Argentario to Forte dei Marmi | 242 km (150 mi) | Plain stage | Miguel María Lasa (ESP) |
| 12a | 2 June | Forte dei Marmi | 20 km (12 mi) | Individual time trial | Eddy Merckx (BEL) |
| 12b | 2 June | Forte dei Marmi | 20 km (12 mi) | Individual time trial | Roger Swerts (BEL) |
| 13 | 3 June | Forte dei Marmi to Savona | 200 km (124 mi) | Stage with mountain(s) | Wilmo Francioni (ITA) |
| 14 | 4 June | Savona to Monte Jafferau | 256 km (159 mi) | Stage with mountain(s) | Eddy Merckx (BEL) |
| | 5 June | Rest day | | | |
| 15 | 6 June | Parabiago to Parabiago | 168 km (104 mi) | Plain stage | Roger De Vlaeminck (BEL) |
| 16 | 7 June | Parabiago to Livigno | 256 km (159 mi) | Stage with mountain(s) | Eddy Merckx (BEL) |
| 17 | 8 June | Livigno to Stelvio Pass | 88 km (55 mi) | Stage with mountain(s) | José Manuel Fuente (ESP) |
| 18 | 9 June | Sulden to Asiago | 223 km (139 mi) | Stage with mountain(s) | Roger De Vlaeminck (BEL) |
| 19a | 10 June | Asiago to Arco | 163 km (101 mi) | Stage with mountain(s) | Roger De Vlaeminck (BEL) |
| 19b | 10 June | Arco to Arco | 18 km (11 mi) | Individual time trial | Eddy Merckx (BEL) |
| 20 | 11 June | Arco to Milan | 185 km (115 mi) | Plain stage | Enrico Paolini (ITA) |
| | Total | | 3,725 km (2,315 mi) | | |

== Race overview ==
During the fourteenth stage, the race jury disqualified Zilioli, Motta and Bitossi, among others, for being pushed eight times or more.

Eddy Merckx lost the sprint finish to defending champion Gösta Pettersson on stage 7 but took the lead of the race and never looked back en route to the 3rd of his five Giro victories. Roger De Vlaeminck won the points classification as well as four of his career 22 Giro stage victories. José Manuel Fuente won the 2nd of his four Giro King of the Mountains titles.

== Classification leadership ==
There were three main individual classifications contested in the 1972 Giro d'Italia, as well as a team competition. Two of them awarded jerseys to their leaders. The general classification was the most important and was calculated by adding each rider's finishing times on each stage. The rider with the lowest cumulative time was the winner of the general classification and was considered the overall winner of the Giro. The rider leading the classification wore a pink jersey to signify the classification's leadership.

The second classification was the points classification. Riders received points for finishing in the top positions in a stage finish, with first place getting the most points, and lower placings getting successively fewer points down to fifteenth place. The rider leading this classification wore a purple (or cyclamen) jersey. The mountains classification was the third classification. In this ranking, points were won by reaching the summit of a climb ahead of other cyclists. Climbs were ranked in first and second categories, the former awarded 50, 30, and 20 points while the latter awarded 30, 20, and 10 points. In this ranking, points were won by reaching the summit of a climb ahead of other cyclists. Most stages of the race included one or more categorized climbs, in which points were awarded to the riders that reached the summit first. In addition there was the Cima Coppi, the Stelvio Pass, which was the highest mountain crossed in this edition of the race. For this designation it gave 200, 100, 80, 70, and 50 points to the first five riders summit the climb. The first rider over the Stelvio was José Manuel Fuente.

The team classification awarded no jersey to its leaders. This was calculated by adding together points earned by each rider on the team during each stage at the finish line, through the intermediate sprints, the categorized climbs, stage finishes, leading the general classification, etc. The team with the most points led the classification.

A minor classification was the intermediate sprints classification, called the traguardi tricolori. On intermediate sprints, the first rider received 30 points for this classification, and the second rider 10 points. No jersey was used to indicate the leader. There was no time bonus at these intermediate sprints, and no points for the points classification.

There was also the combination classification, calculated by adding the positions in the four most important classifications (general, points, mountains and intermediate sprints).

Classification leadership by stage
| Stage | Winner | General classification | Points classification | Mountains classification | Intermediate sprints classification | Team classification |
|---|---|---|---|---|---|---|
| 1 | Marino Basso | Marino Basso | Marino Basso | not awarded | multiple shared | ? |
| 2 | Gianni Motta | Marino Basso | Marino Basso | Gianni Motta | multiple shared | ? |
| 3 | Ugo Colombo | Ugo Colombo | Franco Bitossi | Gianni Motta | Giancarlo Polidori | ? |
| 4a | José Manuel Fuente | José Manuel Fuente | Gianni Motta | Gianni Motta | Giancarlo Polidori | ? |
| 4b | Wilmo Francioni | José Manuel Fuente | Gianni Motta | Gianni Motta | Giancarlo Polidori | ? |
| 5 | Fabrizio Fabbri | José Manuel Fuente | Franco Bitossi & Gianni Motta | Gianni Motta | Giancarlo Polidori | ? |
| 6 | Roger De Vlaeminck | José Manuel Fuente | Gianni Motta | Gianni Motta | Giancarlo Polidori | ? |
| 7 | Gösta Pettersson | Eddy Merckx | Franco Bitossi | Eddy Merckx & José Manuel Fuente | Giancarlo Polidori | ? |
| 8 | Attilio Benfatto | Eddy Merckx | Franco Bitossi | Eddy Merckx & José Manuel Fuente | Giancarlo Polidori | ? |
| 9 | Albert Van Vlierberghe | Eddy Merckx | Franco Bitossi | Eddy Merckx & José Manuel Fuente | Giancarlo Polidori | ? |
| 10 | Italo Zilioli | Eddy Merckx | Franco Bitossi | Eddy Merckx & José Manuel Fuente | Giancarlo Polidori | ? |
| 11 | Miguel María Lasa | Eddy Merckx | Franco Bitossi | Eddy Merckx & José Manuel Fuente | Giancarlo Polidori | Ferretti |
| 12a | Eddy Merckx | Eddy Merckx | Franco Bitossi | Eddy Merckx & José Manuel Fuente | Giancarlo Polidori | ? |
| 12b | Roger Swerts | Eddy Merckx | Eddy Merckx | Eddy Merckx & José Manuel Fuente | Giancarlo Polidori | ? |
| 13 | Wilmo Francioni | Eddy Merckx | Roger De Vlaeminck | Eddy Merckx & José Manuel Fuente | Giancarlo Polidori | ? |
| 14 | Eddy Merckx | Eddy Merckx | Eddy Merckx | Eddy Merckx | Giancarlo Polidori | Molteni |
| 15 | Roger De Vlaeminck | Eddy Merckx | Roger De Vlaeminck | Eddy Merckx | Giancarlo Polidori | Molteni |
| 16 | Eddy Merckx | Eddy Merckx | Eddy Merckx | José Manuel Fuente | Giancarlo Polidori | ? |
| 17 | José Manuel Fuente | Eddy Merckx | Eddy Merckx | José Manuel Fuente | Giancarlo Polidori | ? |
| 18 | Roger De Vlaeminck | Eddy Merckx | Roger De Vlaeminck | José Manuel Fuente | Giancarlo Polidori | ? |
| 19a | Roger De Vlaeminck | Eddy Merckx | Roger De Vlaeminck | José Manuel Fuente | Giancarlo Polidori | Molteni |
| 19b | Eddy Merckx | Eddy Merckx | Roger De Vlaeminck | José Manuel Fuente | Giancarlo Polidori | Molteni |
| 20 | Enrico Paolini | Eddy Merckx | Roger De Vlaeminck | José Manuel Fuente | Giancarlo Polidori | Molteni |
| Final | | Eddy Merckx | Roger De Vlaeminck | José Manuel Fuente | Giancarlo Polidori | Molteni |

== Final standings ==
Legend
| Pink jersey | Denotes the winner of the General classification |
| Violet jersey | Denotes the winner of the Points classification |

=== General classification ===
Final general classification (1–10)
| Rank | Name | Team | Time |
|---|---|---|---|
| 1 | Eddy Merckx (BEL) | Molteni | 103h 4' 04" |
| 2 | José Manuel Fuente (ESP) | KAS | + 5' 30" |
| 3 | Francisco Galdós (ESP) | KAS | + 10' 39" |
| 4 | Vicente López Carril (ESP) | KAS | + 11' 17" |
| 5 | Wladimiro Panizza (ITA) | Zonca | + 13' 00" |
| 6 | Gösta Pettersson (SWE) | Ferretti | + 13' 09" |
| 7 | Roger De Vlaeminck (BEL) | Dreher | + 13' 52" |
| 8 | Felice Gimondi (ITA) | Salvarani | + 14' 05" |
| 9 | Miguel María Lasa (ESP) | KAS | + 14' 19" |
| 10 | Santiago Lazcano (ESP) | KAS | + 17' 42" |

=== Mountains classification ===
Final mountains classification (1–7)
| | Name | Team | Points |
|---|---|---|---|
| 1 | José Manuel Fuente (ESP) | KAS | 490 |
| 2 | Pierfranco Vianelli (ITA) | Dreher | 350 |
| 3 | Primo Mori (ITA) | Salvarani | 260 |
| 4 | Lino Farisato (ITA) | Ferretti | 150 |
| 5 | Vicente López Carril (ESP) | KAS | 100 |
| 6 | Lino Farisato (ITA) | Ferretti | 60 |
| 7 | Fabrizio Fabbri (ITA) | KAS | 50 |
| 7 | Santiago Lazcano (ESP) | KAS | 50 |
| 7 | Silvano Schiavon (ITA) | G.B.C.-Sony | 50 |

=== Points classification ===
Final points classification (1–10)
| | Name | Team | Points |
|---|---|---|---|
| 1 | Roger De Vlaeminck (BEL) | Dreher | 264 |
| 2 | Eddy Merckx (BEL) | Molteni | 244 |
| 3 | Miguel María Lasa (ESP) | KAS | 182 |
| 4 | Felice Gimondi (ITA) | Salvarani | 167 |
| 5 | Ole Ritter (DEN) | Dreher | 130 |
| 6 | Roger Swerts (BEL) | Molteni | 121 |
| 7 | Michele Dancelli (ITA) | Ferretti | 116 |
| 8 | José Manuel Fuente (ESP) | KAS | 95 |
| 9 | Albert Van Vlierberghe (BEL) | Ferretti | 82 |
| 10 | Gösta Pettersson (SWE) | Ferretti | 78 |

=== Traguardi tricolori classification ===
Final traguardi tricolori classification (1–10)
| | Name | Team | Points |
|---|---|---|---|
| 1 | Giancarlo Polidori (ITA) | Scic | 220 |
| 2 | Eddy Merckx (BEL) | Molteni | 90 |
| 3 | Guerrino Tosello (ITA) | Salvarani | 40 |
| 3 | Giacinto Santambrogio (ITA) | Salvarani | 40 |
| 5 | Marcello Bergamo (ITA) | Filotex | 60 |
| 6 | Michele Dancelli (ITA) | Scic | 50 |
| 7 | Albert Van Vlierberghe (BEL) | Ferretti | 40 |
| 7 | Wladimiro Panizza (ITA) | Zonca | 40 |
| 9 | Roger Swerts (BEL) | Molteni | 30 |
| 9 | Emilio Casalini (ITA) | Salvarani | 30 |
| 9 | Mario Anni (ITA) | Ferretti | 30 |
| 9 | Wilmo Francioni (ITA) | Ferretti | 30 |
| 9 | Joseph Bruyère (BEL) | Molteni | 30 |
| 9 | Ugo Colombo (ITA) | Filotex | 30 |
| 9 | Fabrizio Fabbri (ITA) | Magniflex | 30 |

=== Teams classification ===
Final team classification (1–10)
| | Team | Points |
|---|---|---|
| 1 | Molteni | 6120 |
| 2 | KAS | 4721 |
| 3 | Ferretti | 3851 |
| 4 | Dreher | 3202 |
| 5 | Filotex | 3120 |
| 6 | Salvarani | 2956 |
| 7 | Scic | 2464 |
| 8 | G.B.C.-Sony | 1379 |
| 9 | Magniflex | 1347 |
| 10 | Zonca | 1139 |

=== Minor classifications ===
Merckx also won the combination classification which was calculated by totaling each rider's placement in the general, points, and mountains classifications.

== Doping ==
There was no positive doping test in the Giro of 1972.
