= Knut Knudsen =

Norwegian cyclist (born 1950)

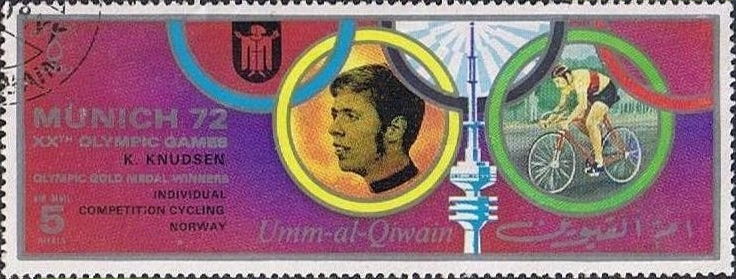
- Kundsen on a stamp of Umm al-Quwain

Personal information
- Born: 12 October 1950 (age 76) Levanger, Norway
- Height: 185 cm (6 ft 1 in)
- Weight: 79 kg (174 lb)

Cycling career
- Sport: Cycling

Major wins
- Grand Tours Giro d'Italia 6 individual stages (1975, 1977, 1979, 1981) Stage races Tirreno–Adriatico (1979) Giro del Trentino (1979)
Medal record
Representing NOR
Men's cycling
Olympic Games
Gold medal – first place	1972 Munich	Individual pursuit
World Championships
Gold medal – first place	1973 San Sebastián	Individual pursuit, amateurs
Silver medal – second place	1975 Rocourt	Individual pursuit, elite
Bronze medal – third place	1976 Monteroni di Lecce	Individual pursuit, elite
Silver medal – second place	1977 San Cristóbal	Individual pursuit, elite

Knut Knudsen (born 12 October 1950) is a retired Norwegian road and track cyclist. As an amateur, he placed fifth in the 4000m individual pursuit at the 1968 Olympics before becoming Olympic champion in the same discipline in 1972. He would follow this up with another gold at the 1973 World Championships. At the 1972 Olympics he also placed fifth in the 100 km team time trial on the road. He won the Norwegian National Road Race Championships in 1972 and 1973.

In 1974 he turned professional and cycled in Italy until 1981. He won six stages of the Giro d'Italia and wore the Maglia Rosa leader's jersey twice, becoming the first Norwegian to do so and the only wearer until Andreas Leknessund managed the same feat some 42 years after Knudsen last held it. The first time he held the pink leader jersey was for two stages after winning Stage 1 of the 1975 Giro d'Italia on 17 May, Norway's constitution day. In 1981 he could once again put on the pink jersey after winning the prologue. After finishing second in the race three times, Knudsen won Tirreno–Adriatico in 1979. He was chosen the world's best time trial cyclist by two biggest sporting magazines from 1979 to 1981. In total he won 49 professional races.

== Major results ==
1966
1st Individual pursuit, National Junior Track Championships
1967
1st Individual pursuit, National Junior Track Championships
1968
1st Road race, National Junior Road Championships
1st Road race, Nordic Junior Road Championships
2nd Team time trial, Nordic Road Championships
1969
National Track Championships

1st Kilo
1st Individual pursuit

1972
1st Individual pursuit, Olympic Games
National Road Championships

1st Road race
1st Time trial

National Track Championships

1st Kilo
1st Individual pursuit

Nordic Amateur Road Championships

1st Road race
2nd Team time trial

1973
1st Individual pursuit, UCI Amateur Track World Championships
National Road Championships

1st Road race
1st Time trial

National Track Championships

1st Kilo
1st Individual pursuit

2nd Team time trial, Nordic Amateur Road Championships
1974
1st Stage 5b Tour de Romandie
2nd Overall Tirreno–Adriatico
1975
Giro d'Italia

1st Stage 1
Held after Stages 1–2
Held after Stage 1

2nd Individual pursuit, UCI Track World Championships
2nd Overall Tirreno–Adriatico

1st Stage 5

3rd Overall Tour de Romandie
3rd Overall Giro di Sardegna
1976
1st Stage 1 Tour de Romandie
3rd Individual pursuit, UCI Track World Championships
1977
1st Stage 9 Giro d'Italia
1st Stage 5 Tirreno–Adriatico
2nd Individual pursuit, UCI Track World Championships
3rd Overall Tour de Romandie

1st Stage 4b

1978
1st Overall Giro di Sardegna

1st Stage 3

1st Overall Giro della Provincia di Reggio Calabria
1st Trofeo Laigueglia
1st Trofeo Baracchi (with Roy Schuiten)
2nd Overall Tirreno–Adriatico

1st Stage 5

3rd Trofeo Pantalica
1979
1st Overall Tirreno–Adriatico

1st Stage 5

1st Overall Giro del Trentino

1st Prologue

Tour de Romandie

1st Stages 3 & 5b

Giro d'Italia

1st Stage 10
Held after Stage 1

2nd Giro del Lazio
3rd Milan–San Remo
1980
1st Stage 1a Paris–Nice
1st Stage 4b Tour de Romandie
1st Prologue Deutschland Tour
1st GP Eddy Merckx
2nd Overall Giro di Sardegna
3rd Trofeo Pantalica
1981
Giro d'Italia

1st Prologue, Stage 13 & 23a
Held & after Prologue

1st Prologue Paris–Nice
1st GP Eddy Merckx
2nd Trofeo Baracchi

=== General classification results timeline ===
Grand Tour general classification results timeline
Grand Tour	1974	1975	1976	1977	1978	1979	1980	1981
Vuelta a España	—	—	—	—	—	—	—	—
Giro d'Italia	54	42	57	70	DNF	DNF	15	22
Tour de France	—	DNF	64	—	—	27	—	—
Major stage race general classification results timeline
Race	1974	1975	1976	1977	1978	1979	1980	1981
Paris–Nice	—	—	—	—	—	—	6	18
Tirreno–Adriatico	2	2	—	31	2	1	—	—
Tour de Romandie	9	3	26	3	N/A	9	6	—
Volta a Catalunya	—	N/A	—	—	—	—	—	—

=== Classics results timeline ===
Monument	1974	1975	1976	1977	1978	1979	1980	1981
Milan–San Remo	—	—	—	—	—	3	—	—
Classic	1974	1975	1976	1977	1978	1979	1980	1981
Amstel Gold Race	—	10	—	—	—	—	—	—
La Flèche Wallonne	—	—	—	—	—	—	34	44

=== Major championships results timeline ===
Event		1972	1973	1974	1975	1976	1977	1978	1979	1980	1981
Olympic Games	Time trial	Not held									
Olympic Games	Road race	—	Not held			—	Not held			—	Not held
Olympic Games	Team Time Trial	5	Not held			—	Not held			—	Not held
Olympic Games	Individual Pursuit	1	Not held			—	Not held			—	Not held
Road World Championships	Time trial	Not held									
Road World Championships	Road race	—	—	DNF	DNF	DNF	DNF	DNF	7	DNF	65
Amateur Track Cycling World Championships	Amateur Individual Pursuit		1	—	—	—	—	—	—	—	—
UCI Track Cycling World Championships	Individual Pursuit	—	—		2	3	2				
National Championships	Time trial	1	1								
National Championships	Road race	1	1								

Legend
—	Did not compete
DNF	Did not finish
	No results available
