= Rik Van Linden =

Belgian cyclist (born 1949)

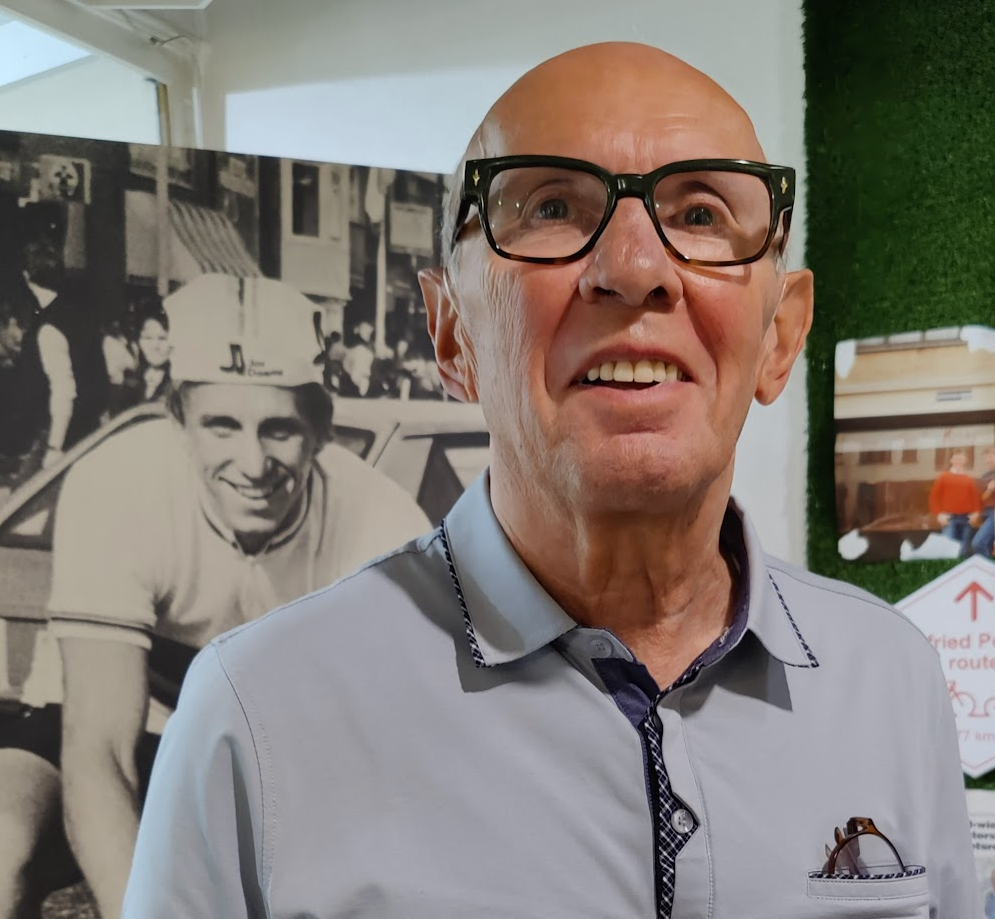
- Van Linden (2025)

Personal information
- Full name: Rik Van Linden
- Born: 28 July 1949 (age 77) Wilrijk, Belgium

Cycling career
- Sport: Cycling
- Discipline: Road
- Role: Rider
- Rider type: Sprinter

Professional teams
- 1971: Hertekamp–Magniflex
- 1972: Van Cauter–Magniflex–de Gribaldy
- 1973: Rokado
- 1974: IJsboerke–Colner
- 1975–1977: Bianchi–Campagnolo
- 1978–1979: Bianchi–Faema
- 1980: DAF Trucks–Lejeune
- 1981: Boule d'Or
- 1982: Hoonved–Bottecchia
- 1983: Batavus–Jos Meesters

Major wins
- Grand Tours Tour de France Points classification (1975) 4 individual stages (1972, 1975) Giro d'Italia 9 individual stages (1973, 1975, 1976, 1977, 1978) Vuelta a España 2 individual stages (1974) One-day races and Classics Paris–Tours (1971, 1973) Stage races Giro di Sardegna (1974) Track Championships National Track Championships Derny (1978, 1979)

Rik Van Linden (born 28 July 1949 in Wilrijk, Antwerp) is a Belgian former road bicycle racer. He won the points classification in the 1975 Tour de France, ahead of Eddy Merckx.

Van Linden also won several stages in all of the three Grand Tours, and the classic cycle race Paris–Tours twice (1971, 1973).

Through his career, he eventually won 359 races, of which 73 as junior cyclist in 1968.

== Major results ==
=== Road ===
1968
1st Road race, National Junior Road Championships
1969
1st Ronde van Vlaanderen Beloften
1971
1st Paris–Tours
2nd Kampioenschap van Vlaanderen
2nd Omloop der Zennevallei
3rd GP di Larciano
8th Trofeo Matteotti
9th Scheldeprijs
1972
Tour de France

1st Stage 2
2nd Points Classification

1st Stage 5a Tirreno–Adriatico
3rd GP van Malderen
8th Paris–Tours
9th Amstel Gold Race
10th Brussel-Ingooigem
1973
1st Paris–Tours
Giro d'Italia

1st Stages 7 & 17

Paris–Nice

1st Stages 2, 3b (TTT), 5 & 7a

Tour of Belgium

1st Prologue (TTT)

Giro di Sardegna

1st Stages 1, 2 & 4b

1st Puivelde Koerse
2nd Grand Prix Pino Cerami
3rd Overall Vuelta a Andalucía

1st Prologue & Stages 1, 4 & 6

3rd Paris–Brussels
4th Milan–San Remo
10th E3 Harelbeke
1974
1st Overall Giro di Sardegna
Vuelta a España

1st Stages 3 & 4

10th Overall Paris–Nice

1st Points Classification
1st Stage 7a

1st Omloop der Zuid-West-Vlaamse Bergen
2nd Grote Prijs Jef Scherens
2nd Omloop Schelde-Durme
3rd Omloop Het Volk
3rd Grand Prix Pino Cerami
3rd GP van Malderen
5th Scheldeprijs
6th Grand Prix of Aargau Canton
7th Tour of Flanders
7th Kampioenschap van Vlaanderen
8th Paris–Tours
9th Road race, National Road Championships
1975
Tour de France

1st Points classification
1st Stages 1b, 19 & 21

1st Milano–Vignola
1st Stage 5 Giro d'Italia
1st Stage 3a Setmana Catalana de Ciclisme
1st GP Union Dortmund
2nd Grand Prix Pino Cerami
3rd Gent–Wevelgem
3rd Dwars door West-Vlaanderen
5th Tour of Flanders
7th Brabantse Pijl
1976
1st Milano–Vignola
1st Giro di Campania
1st Stage 5a Tirreno–Adriatico
1st Stage 1 Giro di Puglia
Giro d'Italia

1st Stages 3 & 15

1st GP Berlare
2nd Gent–Wevelgem
6th Milan–San Remo
6th Rund um den Henninger Turm
1977
1st Milano–Torino
1st Stage 2a Giro d'Italia
1st Stage 4 Tirreno–Adriatico
1st Circuit de Niel
2nd Overall Giro di Sardegna

1st Stage 4

2nd Acht van Chaam
2nd Ronde van Limburg
2nd Maaslandse Pijl
4th Milan–San Remo
1978
1st Milano–Vignola
1st Stage 5a Tirreno–Adriatico
10th Overall Giro d'Italia

1st Stages 1, 5 & 6

Giro di Puglia

1st Stage 3

5th Milan–San Remo
7th Gent–Wevelgem
1979
3rd Grand Prix Pino Cerami
7th Overall Giro di Puglia
1980
1st Stage 7a Paris–Nice
2nd Grand Prix de Cannes
3rd E3 Prijs Vlaanderen
1981
1st Ruddervoorde Koerse
2nd Omloop van Neeroeteren
10th Le Samyn
1982
3rd Milano–Torino

=== Track ===
1969
3rd National Track Championships Juniors, Omnium
1970
1st National Track Championships Amateurs, Omnium
1972
2nd Six Days of Antwerp with (Patrick Sercu and Alain van Lancker)
3rd National Track Championships, Madison (with Norbert Seeuws)
1973
2nd National Track Championships, Derny
3rd European Track Championships – Madison (with Julien Stevens)
1974
2nd National Track Championships, Madison (with Julien Stevens)
2nd Six Days of Antwerp (with René Pijnen)
1975
2nd National Track Championships, Madison (with Julien Stevens)
1976
National Track Championships

2nd Madison (with Dirk Baert)
3rd Omnium
3rd Derny

2nd Six Days of Milan (with Felice Gimondi)
3rd Six Days of Antwerp (with Graeme Gilmore)
1977
2nd National Track Championships, Derny
1st Six Days of Milan (with Felice Gimondi)
3rd Six Days of Antwerp (with René Pijnen)
1978
National Track Championships

1st Derny

1979
National Track Championships

1st Derny

2nd Six Days of Antwerp (with Patrick Sercu and Roger De Vlaeminck)
