= 1974 Tirreno–Adriatico =

Race details
- Dates: 12–16 March 1974
- Stages: 5
- Distance: 780 km (484.7 mi)
- Winning time: 20h 18' 09"

Results
	Winner	Roger De Vlaeminck (BEL)	(Brooklyn)
	Second	Knut Knudsen (NOR)	(Jollj Ceramica)
	Third	Simone Fraccaro (ITA)	(Filcas)

The 1974 Tirreno–Adriatico was the 9th edition of the Tirreno–Adriatico cycle race and was held from 12 March to 16 March 1974. The race started in Santa Marinella and finished in San Benedetto del Tronto. The race was won by Roger De Vlaeminck of the Brooklyn team.

== General classification ==
Final general classification

Rank	Rider	Team	Time
1	Roger De Vlaeminck (BEL)	Brooklyn	20h 18' 09"
2	Knut Knudsen (NOR)	Jollj Ceramica	+ 53"
3	Simone Fraccaro (ITA)	Filcas	+ 1' 07"
4	Josef Fuchs (SUI)	Filotex	+ 1' 08"
5	Francesco Moser (ITA)	Filotex	+ 1' 15"
6	Freddy Maertens (BEL)	Carpenter–Confortluxe–Flandria	+ 1' 18"
7	Ole Ritter (DEN)	Filotex	+ 1' 20"
8	Franco Bitossi (ITA)	Scic	+ 1' 22"
9	Frans Verbeeck (BEL)	Watney–Maes Pils	+ 1' 32"
10	Walter Planckaert (BEL)	Watney–Maes Pils	+ 1' 32"
