= 1970 Omloop Het Volk =

Race details
- Dates: 28 February 1970
- Stages: 1
- Distance: 195 km (121 mi)
- Winning time: 4h 52' 00"

Results
	Winner	Frans Verbeeck (BEL)
	Second	Roger Rosiers (BEL)
	Third	André Dierickx (BEL)

The 1970 Omloop Het Volk was the 25th edition of the Omloop Het Volk cycle race and was held on 28 February 1970. The race started and finished in Ghent. The race was won by Frans Verbeeck.

== General classification ==
Final general classification
Rank	Rider	Time
1	Frans Verbeeck (BEL)	4h 52' 00"
2	Roger Rosiers (BEL)	+ 0"
3	André Dierickx (BEL)	+ 0"
4	Jos van der Vleuten (NED)	+ 0"
5	Georges Pintens (BEL)	+ 0"
6	Daniel Van Ryckeghem (BEL)	+ 25"
7	Eddy Merckx (BEL)	+ 25"
8	Roger De Vlaeminck (BEL)	+ 25"
9	Willy Vekemans (BEL)	+ 25"
10	Norbert Callens (BEL)	+ 25"
