= 1974 Paris–Roubaix =

Race details
- Dates: 7 April 1974
- Stages: 1
- Distance: 274 km (170.3 mi)
- Winning time: 7h 17' 26"

Results
	Winner	Roger De Vlaeminck (BEL)	(Brooklyn)
	Second	Francesco Moser (ITA)	(Filotex)
	Third	Marc Demeyer (BEL)	(Carpenter–Confortluxe–Flandria)

The 1974 Paris–Roubaix was the 72nd edition of the Paris–Roubaix cycle race and was held on 7 April 1974. The race started in Compiègne and finished in Roubaix. The race was won by Roger De Vlaeminck of the Brooklyn team.

== General classification ==
Final general classification

Rank	Rider	Team	Time
1	Roger De Vlaeminck (BEL)	Brooklyn	7h 17' 26"
2	Francesco Moser (ITA)	Filotex	+ 57"
3	Marc Demeyer (BEL)	Carpenter–Confortluxe–Flandria	+ 1' 24"
4	Eddy Merckx (BEL)	Molteni	+ 1' 24"
5	Eric Leman (BEL)	MIC–Ludo–de Gribaldy	+ 1' 24"
6	André Dierickx (BEL)	Merlin Plage–Shimano–Flandria	+ 1' 24"
7	Freddy Maertens (BEL)	Carpenter–Confortluxe–Flandria	+ 4' 26"
8	Herman Van Springel (BEL)	MIC–Ludo–de Gribaldy	+ 4' 26"
9	Herman Vrijders (BEL)	MIC–Ludo–de Gribaldy	+ 4' 26"
10	Michel Périn (FRA)	Gan–Mercier–Hutchinson	+ 4' 26"
