= 1970 Scheldeprijs =

Race details
- Dates: 28 July 1970
- Stages: 1
- Distance: 241 km (149.8 mi)
- Winning time: 5h 30' 00"

Results
	Winner	Roger De Vlaeminck (BEL)
	Second	Raphaël Hooyberghs (BEL)
	Third	Alfons Scheys (BEL)

The 1970 Scheldeprijs was the 57th edition of the Scheldeprijs cycle race and was held on 28 July 1970. The race was won by Roger De Vlaeminck.

== General classification ==
Final general classification

Rank	Rider	Time
1	Roger De Vlaeminck (BEL)	5h 30' 00"
2	Raphaël Hooyberghs (BEL)	+ 10"
3	Alfons Scheys (BEL)	+ 10"
4	Daniel Van Ryckeghem (BEL)	+ 3' 30"
5	Frans Kerremans (BEL)	+ 3' 30"
6	Marc Sohet (BEL)	+ 3' 30"
7	Gilbert Wuytack (BEL)	+ 4' 30"
8	Georges Pintens (BEL)	+ 4' 30"
9	Ronald De Witte (BEL)	+ 4' 30"
10	Jacky Coene (BEL)	+ 4' 40"
