= 1975 Tour de Suisse =

Race details
- Dates: 12–20 June 1975
- Stages: 10 + Prologue
- Distance: 1,629 km (1,012 mi)
- Winning time: 44h 22' 48"

Results
	Winner	Roger De Vlaeminck (BEL)	(Brooklyn)
	Second	Eddy Merckx (BEL)	(Molteni–RYC)
	Third	Louis Pfenninger (SUI)	(Zonca)
	Points	Roger De Vlaeminck (BEL)	(Brooklyn)
	Mountains	Giancarlo Bellini (ITA)	(Brooklyn)
	Team	Brooklyn	

The 1975 Tour de Suisse was the 39th edition of the Tour de Suisse cycle race and was held from 12 June to 20 June 1975. The race started in Baden and finished in Affoltern am Albis. The race was won by Roger De Vlaeminck of the Brooklyn team.

== General classification ==
Final general classification

Rank	Rider	Team	Time
1	Roger De Vlaeminck (BEL)	Brooklyn	44h 22' 48"
2	Eddy Merckx (BEL)	Molteni–RYC	+ 55"
3	Louis Pfenninger (SUI)	Zonca	+ 1' 28"
4	Bert Pronk (NED)	TI–Raleigh	+ 4' 07"
5	Walter Riccomi (ITA)	Scic	+ 4' 32"
6	André Dierickx (BEL)	Rokado	+ 4' 39"
7	Giancarlo Bellini (ITA)	Brooklyn	+ 9' 21"
8	Edward Janssens (BEL)	Molteni–RYC	+ 9' 35"
9	Italo Zilioli (ITA)	Magniflex	+ 10' 27"
10	Dietrich Thurau (FRG)	TI–Raleigh	+ 10' 50"
