= 1977 Milan–San Remo =

Race details
- Dates: 19 March 1977
- Stages: 1
- Distance: 288 km (179 mi)
- Winning time: 6h 41' 59"

Results
	Winner	Jan Raas (NED)	(Frisol–Thirion–Gazelle)
	Second	Roger De Vlaeminck (BEL)	(Brooklyn)
	Third	Wilfried Wesemael (BEL)	(Frisol–Thirion–Gazelle)

The 1977 Milan–San Remo was the 68th edition of the Milan–San Remo cycle race and was held on 19 March 1977. The race started in Milan and finished in San Remo. The race was won by Jan Raas of the Frisol team.

== General classification ==
Final general classification

Rank	Rider	Team	Time
1	Jan Raas (NED)	Frisol–Thirion–Gazelle	6h 41' 59"
2	Roger De Vlaeminck (BEL)	Brooklyn	+ 3"
3	Wilfried Wesemael (BEL)	Frisol–Thirion–Gazelle	+ 5"
4	Rik Van Linden (BEL)	Bianchi–Campagnolo	+ 5"
5	Freddy Maertens (BEL)	Flandria–Velda–Latina Assicurazioni	+ 5"
6	Pierino Gavazzi (ITA)	Jollj Ceramica	+ 5"
7	Walter Planckaert (BEL)	Maes Pils–Mini-Flat	+ 5"
8	Patrick Sercu (BEL)	Fiat France	+ 5"
9	Gabriele Landoni (ITA)	GBC–Itla TV	+ 5"
10	Jean-Luc Vandenbroucke (BEL)	Peugeot–Esso–Michelin	+ 5"
