= 1973 Milan–San Remo =

Race details
- Dates: 19 March 1973
- Stages: 1
- Distance: 288 km (179 mi)
- Winning time: 6h 53' 34"

Results
	Winner	Roger De Vlaeminck (BEL)	(Brooklyn)
	Second	Wilmo Francioni (ITA)	(GBC–Sony–Furzi)
	Third	Felice Gimondi (ITA)	(Bianchi–Campagnolo)

The 1973 Milan–San Remo was the 64th edition of the Milan–San Remo cycle race and was held on 19 March 1973. The race started in Milan and finished in San Remo. The race was won by Roger De Vlaeminck of the Brooklyn team.

== General classification ==
Final general classification

Rank	Rider	Team	Time
1	Roger De Vlaeminck (BEL)	Brooklyn	6h 53' 34"
2	Wilmo Francioni (ITA)	GBC–Sony–Furzi	+ 2"
3	Felice Gimondi (ITA)	Bianchi–Campagnolo	+ 4"
4	Rik Van Linden (BEL)	Rokado–De Gribaldy	+ 6"
5	Patrick Sercu (BEL)	Brooklyn	+ 6"
6	Frans Verbeeck (BEL)	Watney–Maes Pils	+ 6"
7	Aldo Parecchini (ITA)	Molteni	+ 6"
8	Franco Ongarato (ITA)	Dreherforte	+ 6"
9	Cyrille Guimard (FRA)	Gan–Mercier–Hutchinson	+ 6"
10	Walter Godefroot (BEL)	Flandria–Carpenter–Shimano	+ 6"
