= 1975 Tirreno–Adriatico =

Race details
- Dates: 12–16 March 1975
- Stages: 5
- Distance: 816 km (507.0 mi)
- Winning time: 21h 34' 38"

Results
	Winner	Roger De Vlaeminck (BEL)	(Brooklyn)
	Second	Knut Knudsen (NOR)	(Jollj Ceramica)
	Third	Wladimiro Panizza (ITA)	(Brooklyn)

The 1975 Tirreno–Adriatico was the 10th edition of the Tirreno–Adriatico cycle race and was held from 12 March to 16 March 1975. The race started in Santa Marinella and finished in San Benedetto del Tronto. The race was won by Roger De Vlaeminck of the Brooklyn team.

== General classification ==
Final general classification

Rank	Rider	Team	Time
1	Roger De Vlaeminck (BEL)	Brooklyn	21h 34' 38"
2	Knut Knudsen (NOR)	Jollj Ceramica	+ 19"
3	Wladimiro Panizza (ITA)	Brooklyn	+ 48"
4	Francesco Moser (ITA)	Filotex	+ 1' 01"
5	Felice Gimondi (ITA)	Bianchi–Campagnolo	+ 1' 09"
6	Frans Verbeeck (BEL)	Maes Pils–Watney	+ 1' 15"
7	Giancarlo Polidori (ITA)	Furzi–FT	+ 1' 34"
8	Enrico Paolini (ITA)	Scic	+ 2' 08"
9	Hennie Kuiper (NED)	Frisol–G.B.C.	+ 2' 11"
10	Alfredo Chinetti (ITA)	Furzi–FT	+ 2' 15"
