= 1970 E3 Prijs Vlaanderen =

1970 E3 Harelbeke
Race details
- Dates: 21 March 1970
- Stages: 1
- Distance: 210 km (130 mi)
- Winning time: 5h 01' 00"

Results
	Winner	Daniel Van Ryckeghem (BEL)	(Dr. Mann–Grundig)
	Second	Roger De Vlaeminck (BEL)	(Flandria–Mars)
	Third	Roger Rosiers (BEL)	(Bic)

The 1970 E3 Harelbeke was the 13th edition of the E3 Harelbeke cycle race and was held on 21 March 1970. The race started and finished in Harelbeke. The race was won by Daniel Van Ryckeghem of the Dr. Mann team.

== General classification ==
Final general classification

Rank	Rider	Team	Time
1	Daniel Van Ryckeghem (BEL)	Dr. Mann–Grundig	5h 01' 00"
2	Roger De Vlaeminck (BEL)	Flandria–Mars	+ 0"
3	Roger Rosiers (BEL)	Bic	+ 0"
4	Gerard Vianen (NED)	Caballero–Laurens	+ 0"
5	Julien Stevens (BEL)	Faemino–Faema	+ 0"
6	Willy Van Neste (BEL)	Dr. Mann–Grundig	+ 0"
7	Eric Leman (BEL)	Flandria–Mars	+ 12"
8	Eddy Peelman (BEL)	Fagor–Mercier–Hutchinson	+ 12"
9	Frans Melckenbeeck (BEL)	Goldor–Fryns	+ 12"
10	Georges Vandenberghe (BEL)	Faemino–Faema	+ 12"
