= 1971 E3 Prijs Vlaanderen =

1971 E3 Harelbeke
Race details
- Dates: 27 March 1971
- Stages: 1
- Distance: 235 km (146 mi)
- Winning time: 5h 57' 00"

Results
	Winner	Roger De Vlaeminck (BEL)
	Second	Georges Pintens (BEL)
	Third	Eddy Merckx (BEL)

The 1971 E3 Harelbeke was the 14th edition of the E3 Harelbeke cycle race and was held on 27 March 1971. The race started and finished in Harelbeke. The race was won by Roger De Vlaeminck.

== General classification ==
Final general classification

Rank	Rider	Time
1	Roger De Vlaeminck (BEL)	5h 57' 00"
2	Georges Pintens (BEL)	+ 3"
3	Eddy Merckx (BEL)	+ 8"
4	Walter Godefroot (BEL)	+ 40"
5	Erik De Vlaeminck (BEL)	+ 42"
6	Frans Verbeeck (BEL)	+ 45"
7	Guido Reybrouck (BEL)	+ 48"
8	Eric Leman (BEL)	+ 48"
9	Willy Planckaert (BEL)	+ 48"
10	Daniel Van Ryckeghem (BEL)	+ 48"
