= 1971 Gent–Wevelgem =

Race details
- Dates: 31 March 1971
- Stages: 1
- Distance: 237 km (147 mi)
- Winning time: 5h 19' 00"

Results
| | Winner | Georges Pintens (BEL) | (Hertekamp–Magniflex) |
| | Second | Roger De Vlaeminck (BEL) | (Flandria–Mars) |
| | Third | Gerben Karstens (NED) | (Goudsmit–Hoff) |

The 1971 Gent–Wevelgem was the 33rd edition of the Belgian Gent–Wevelgem cycle race and was held on 31 March 1971. The race started in Ghent and finished in Wevelgem. The race was won by Georges Pintens of the Hertekamp team.

== General classification ==
Final general classification

| Rank | Rider | Team | Time |
|---|---|---|---|
| 1 | Georges Pintens (BEL) | Hertekamp–Magniflex | 5h 19' 00" |
| 2 | Roger De Vlaeminck (BEL) | Flandria–Mars | + 0" |
| 3 | Gerben Karstens (NED) | Goudsmit–Hoff | + 0" |
| 4 | Leif Mortensen (DEN) | Bic | + 0" |
| 5 | Daniel Van Ryckeghem (BEL) | Sonolor–Lejeune | + 0" |
| 6 | Frans Kerremans (BEL) | Hertekamp–Magniflex | + 0" |
| 7 | Cyrille Guimard (FRA) | Fagor–Mercier–Hutchinson | + 0" |
| 8 | Marino Basso (ITA) | Molteni | + 0" |
| 9 | Jan Janssen (NED) | Bic | + 0" |
| 10 | Frans Verbeeck (BEL) | Watney–Avia | + 0" |
