= 1976 Giro di Lombardia =

Race details
- Dates: 9 October 1976
- Stages: 1
- Distance: 253 km (157 mi)
- Winning time: 6h 26' 00"

Results
	Winner	Roger De Vlaeminck (BEL)	(Brooklyn)
	Second	Bernard Thévenet (FRA)	(Peugeot–Esso–Michelin)
	Third	Wladimiro Panizza (ITA)	(Scic)

The 1976 Giro di Lombardia was the 70th edition of the Giro di Lombardia cycle race and was held on 9 October 1976. The race started in Milan and finished in Como. The race was won by Roger De Vlaeminck of the Brooklyn team.

== General classification ==
Final general classification

Rank	Rider	Team	Time
1	Roger De Vlaeminck (BEL)	Brooklyn	6h 26' 00"
2	Bernard Thévenet (FRA)	Peugeot–Esso–Michelin	+ 0"
3	Wladimiro Panizza (ITA)	Scic	+ 0"
4	Joop Zoetemelk (NED)	Gan–Mercier–Hutchinson	+ 0"
5	Raymond Poulidor (FRA)	Gan–Mercier–Hutchinson	+ 0"
6	Francesco Moser (ITA)	Sanson	+ 1' 12"
7	Frans Verbeeck (BEL)	IJsboerke–Colnago	+ 1' 12"
8	Franco Bitossi (ITA)	Zonca–Santini	+ 1' 12"
9	Tino Conti (ITA)	Magniflex–Torpado	+ 1' 12"
10	Walter Riccomi (ITA)	Scic	+ 1' 12"
