= 1971 Tirreno–Adriatico =

Cycling race in Italy

Race details
- Dates: 10–14 March 1971
- Stages: 5
- Distance: 985 km (612.1 mi)
- Winning time: 26h 33' 18"

Results
	Winner	Italo Zilioli (ITA)
	Second	Georges Pintens (BEL)
	Third	Marcello Bergamo (ITA)

The 1971 Tirreno–Adriatico was the sixth edition of the Tirreno–Adriatico cycle race and was held from 10 March to 14 March 1971. The race started in Ladispoli and finished in San Benedetto del Tronto. The race was won by Italo Zilioli.

== General classification ==
Final general classification

Rank	Rider	Time
1	Italo Zilioli (ITA)	26h 33' 18"
2	Georges Pintens (BEL)	+ 1' 24"
3	Marcello Bergamo (ITA)	+ 1' 31"
4	Pierfranco Vianelli (ITA)	+ 1' 46"
5	Aldo Moser (ITA)	+ 1' 48"
6	Enrico Maggioni (ITA)	+ 2' 16"
7	Gianni Motta (ITA)	+ 3' 16"
8	Giancarlo Polidori (ITA)	+ 3' 36"
9	Noël Van Clooster (BEL)	+ 3' 51"
10	Davide Boifava (ITA)	+ 3' 55"
