= 1973 Giro di Lombardia =

Race details
- Dates: 13 October 1973
- Stages: 1
- Distance: 266 km (165.3 mi)
- Winning time: 7h 07' 42"

Results
	Winner	Felice Gimondi (ITA)	(Bianchi–Campagnolo)
	Second	Roger De Vlaeminck (BEL)	(Brooklyn)
	Third	Herman Van Springel (BEL)	(Rokado–De Gribaldy)

The 1973 Giro di Lombardia was the 67th edition of the Giro di Lombardia cycle race and was held on 13 October 1973. The race started in Milan and finished in Como. The race was won by Felice Gimondi of the Bianchi team.

== General classification ==
Final general classification (Note: Eddy Merckx arrived first with a time of 7h 03' 27", ahead of Gimondi by 4' 15", but was disqualified for failing a dope test.)

Rank	Rider	Team	Time
1	Felice Gimondi (ITA)	Bianchi–Campagnolo	7h 07' 42"
2	Roger De Vlaeminck (BEL)	Brooklyn	+ 0"
3	Herman Van Springel (BEL)	Rokado–De Gribaldy	+ 0"
4	Marcello Bergamo (ITA)	Filotex	+ 0"
5	André Dierickx (BEL)	Flandria–Carpenter–Shimano	+ 0"
6	Miguel María Lasa (ESP)	Kas–Kaskol	+ 0"
7	Régis Ovion (FRA)	Peugeot–BP–Michelin	+ 0"
8	Frans Verbeeck (BEL)	Watney–Maes Pils	+ 0"
9	Franco Bitossi (ITA)	Sammontana	+ 0"
10	Italo Zilioli (ITA)	Dreherforte	+ 0"
