= 1977 Paris–Roubaix =

Race details
- Dates: 17 April 1977
- Stages: 1
- Distance: 250.5 km (155.7 mi)
- Winning time: 6h 11' 26"

Results
	Winner	Roger De Vlaeminck (BEL)	(Brooklyn)
	Second	Willy Teirlinck (BEL)	(Gitane–Campagnolo)
	Third	Freddy Maertens (BEL)	(Flandria–Velda–Latina Assicurazioni)

The 1977 Paris–Roubaix was the 75th edition of the Paris–Roubaix cycle race and was held on 17 April 1977. The race started in Compiègne and finished in Roubaix. The race was won by Roger De Vlaeminck of the Brooklyn cycling team from Italy.

== General classification ==
Final general classification

Rank	Rider	Team	Time
1	Roger De Vlaeminck (BEL)	Brooklyn	6h 11' 26"
2	Willy Teirlinck (BEL)	Gitane–Campagnolo	+ 1' 30"
3	Freddy Maertens (BEL)	Flandria–Velda–Latina Assicurazioni	+ 1' 39"
4	Ronald De Witte (BEL)	Brooklyn	+ 1' 39"
5	Piet van Katwijk (NED)	TI–Raleigh	+ 1' 39"
6	Jan Raas (NED)	Frisol–Thirion–Gazelle	+ 1' 39"
7	Willem Peeters (BEL)	IJsboerke–Colnago	+ 1' 39"
8	Dietrich Thurau (FRG)	TI–Raleigh	+ 1' 39"
9	Herman Van Springel (BEL)	IJsboerke–Colnago	+ 1' 39"
10	Hennie Kuiper (NED)	TI–Raleigh	+ 1' 39"
