= Giancarlo Bellini =

Italian cyclist

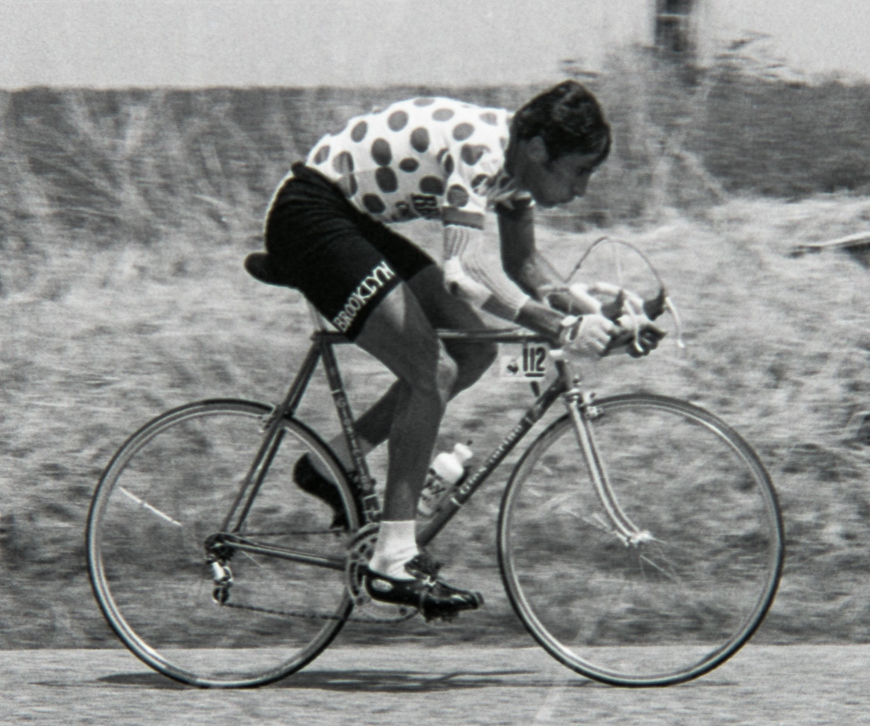
- Bellini at the 1976 Tour de France

Personal information
- Full name: Giancarlo Bellini
- Born: 15 September 1945 (age 81) Crosa, Italy

Cycling career
- Sport: Cycling
- Discipline: Road
- Role: Rider

Professional teams
- 1971–1973: Molteni
- 1974–1977: Brooklyn
- 1978–1979: Zonca–Santini

Major wins
- Grand Tours Tour de France Mountains classification (1976) Giro d'Italia 1 individual stage (1978)

Giancarlo Bellini (born 15 September 1945 in Crosa) is an Italian former road bicycle racer who won the mountains classification in the 1976 Tour de France. He also won a stage in the 1978 Giro d'Italia.

Bellini won the first edition of the Amateur Giro d'Italia in 1970 before spending three years at Molteni in the service of Eddy Merckx.

If doping controls to the standard that the sport has in 2024 existed then Bellini would've finished eighth in the 1978 1978 Giro d'Italia.

== Major results ==
1970
1st Overall Giro Ciclistico d'Italia

1st Stage 5 (ITT)

1972
10th Overall Tour de la Nouvelle France
1973
6th Giro di Sicilia
10th Giro del Veneto
1975
1st Giro di Campania
1st Stage 3 (ITT) Cronostaffetta
5th Giro dell'Appennino
7th Overall Tour de Suisse

1st Mountains classification
1st Stage 6

8th Overall Tour de Romandie
8th GP Cannes
1976
1st Mountains classification Tour de France
7th Overall Tirreno–Adriatico
8th Overall Tour de Romandie

1st Mountains classification
1st Stage 3

1977
9th Overall Tour de Romandie

1st Stage 4

9th Overall Giro di Campania
10th Overall Tour de Suisse
1978
1st Stage 12 Giro d'Italia
1st Stage 10 Tour de Suisse
