= 1969 Omloop Het Volk =

Race details
- Dates: 1 March 1969
- Stages: 1
- Distance: 193 km (120 mi)
- Winning time: 4h 44' 00"

Results
	Winner	Roger De Vlaeminck (BEL)
	Second	Daniel Van Ryckeghem (BEL)
	Third	Valere Van Sweevelt (BEL)

The 1969 Omloop Het Volk was the 24th edition of the Omloop Het Volk cycle race and was held on 1 March 1969. The race started and finished in Ghent. The race was won by Roger De Vlaeminck.

== General classification ==
Final general classification
Rank	Rider	Time
1	Roger De Vlaeminck (BEL)	4h 44' 00"
2	Daniel Van Ryckeghem (BEL)	+ 0"
3	Valere Van Sweevelt (BEL)	+ 0"
4	Jos Schoeters (BEL)	+ 0"
5	Patrick Sercu (BEL)	+ 0"
6	Eric Leman (BEL)	+ 0"
7	Cees Zoontjens (NED)	+ 0"
8	Roger Rosiers (BEL)	+ 0"
9	Jacques Guiot (FRA)	+ 0"
10	Frans Verbeeck (BEL)	+ 0"
