= 1973 Tirreno–Adriatico =

Race details
- Dates: 13–17 March 1973
- Stages: 5
- Distance: 582 km (361.6 mi)
- Winning time: 14h 26' 12"

Results
	Winner	Roger De Vlaeminck (BEL)
	Second	Frans Verbeeck (BEL)
	Third	Gösta Pettersson (SWE)

The 1973 Tirreno–Adriatico was the eighth edition of the Tirreno–Adriatico cycle race and was held from 13 March to 17 March 1973. The race started in Ostia and finished in San Benedetto del Tronto. The race was won by Roger De Vlaeminck.

== General classification ==
Final general classification

Rank	Rider	Time
1	Roger De Vlaeminck (BEL)	14h 26' 12"
2	Frans Verbeeck (BEL)	+ 42"
3	Gösta Pettersson (SWE)	+ 1' 20"
4	Roger Swerts (BEL)	+ 1' 25"
5	Davide Boifava (ITA)	+ 1' 37"
6	Ole Ritter (DEN)	+ 1' 40"
7	Pietro Guerra (ITA)	+ 1' 44"
7	Felice Gimondi (ITA)	+ 1' 44"
9	Francesco Moser (ITA)	+ 1' 48"
10	Italo Zilioli (ITA)	+ 1' 49"
