= 1971 La Flèche Wallonne =

Race details
- Dates: 22 April 1971
- Stages: 1
- Distance: 225 km (139.8 mi)
- Winning time: 5h 55' 00"

Results
	Winner	Roger De Vlaeminck (BEL)	(Flandria–Mars)
	Second	Frans Verbeeck (BEL)	(Watney–Avia)
	Third	Jos Deschoenmaecker (BEL)	(Molteni)

The 1971 La Flèche Wallonne was the 35th edition of La Flèche Wallonne cycle race and was held on 22 April 1971. The race started in Liège and finished in Marcinelle. The race was won by Roger De Vlaeminck of the Flandria team.

== General classification ==
Final general classification

Rank	Rider	Team	Time
1	Roger De Vlaeminck (BEL)	Flandria–Mars	5h 55' 00"
2	Frans Verbeeck (BEL)	Watney–Avia	+ 0"
3	Jos Deschoenmaecker (BEL)	Molteni	+ 6"
4	Joop Zoetemelk (NED)	Flandria–Mars	+ 1' 13"
5	Walter Godefroot (BEL)	Peugeot–BP–Michelin	+ 4' 45"
6	Herman Van Springel (BEL)	Molteni	+ 5' 32"
7	Edy Schütz (LUX)	Flandria–Mars	+ 6' 28"
8	Gerben Karstens (NED)	Goudsmit–Hoff	+ 11' 25"
9	Christian Callens (BEL)	Hertekamp–Magniflex–Novy	+ 11' 25"
10	Gianni Motta (ITA)	Salvarani	+ 11' 25"
