= Roger De Vlaeminck =

Belgian cyclist (born 1947)

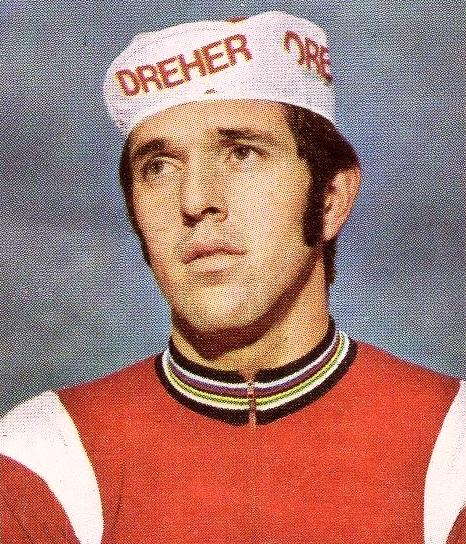
- De Vlaeminck in 1972

Personal information
- Full name: Roger De Vlaeminck
- Nicknames: Le gitan (The Gypsy); Monsieur Paris–Roubaix
- Born: 24 August 1947 (age 79) Eeklo, East Flanders, Belgium

Cycling career
- Sport: Cycling
- Disciplines: Road; Cyclo-cross
- Role: Rider
- Rider type: Classics specialist

Professional teams
- 1969–1971: Flandria–De Clerck–Krüger
- 1972: Dreher
- 1973–1977: Brooklyn
- 1978: Sanson–Campagnolo
- 1979: Gis Gelati
- 1980: Boule d'Or–Studio Casa
- 1981–1982: DAF Trucks–Côte d'Or
- 1983: Gios–Clement
- 1984: Gis Gelati–Tuc Lu

Major wins
- Cyclo-cross World Championships (1975) National Championships (1974, 1975, 1978) Road Grand Tours Tour de France 1 individual stage (1970) Giro d'Italia Points classification (1972, 1974, 1975) 22 individual stages (1972–1976, 1979) Vuelta a España 1 individual stage (1984) Stage races Tirreno–Adriatico (1972, 1973, 1974, 1975, 1976, 1977) Tour de Suisse (1975) One-day races and Classics National Road Race Championships (1969, 1981) Milan–San Remo (1973, 1978, 1979) Tour of Flanders (1977) Paris–Roubaix (1972, 1974, 1975, 1977) Liège–Bastogne–Liège (1970) Giro di Lombardia (1974, 1976) Omloop Het Volk (1969, 1979) Milano-Torino (1972, 1974) La Flèche Wallonne (1971) E3 Prijs Vlaanderen (1971)
Medal record
Representing Belgium
Men's cyclo-cross
World Championships
| Gold medal – first place | 1975 Melchnau | Elite |
| Silver medal – second place | 1974 Bera | Elite |
Men's road bicycle racing
World Championships
| Silver medal – second place | 1975 Yvoir | Elite road race |

Roger De Vlaeminck (Flemish pronunciation: [rɔˈʑeː də ˈvlaːmɪŋk]; born 24 August 1947) is a Belgian former professional racing cyclist. He was described by Rik Van Looy as "The most talented and the only real classics rider of his generation". Nicknamed "The Gypsy" because he was born into a family of traveling clothiers, he is known for exploits in the cobbled classic Paris–Roubaix race, but his performances in other "Monument" races gave him a record that few can match. His record in Paris–Roubaix earned him another nickname, "Monsieur Paris–Roubaix".

== Early life and amateur career ==
De Vlaeminck was born on 24 August 1947 in the East Flanders town of Eeklo, His first love was football. At the age of 16 he debuted for F.C. Eeklo. He could have made a career in the sport, however his elder brother Erik was having success as a pro cyclist and this persuaded Roger to try cycling. He raced as a junior in 1965, gaining one win, but 1966 saw 25 victories. Roger and Erik spent their winters riding cyclo-cross. In Luxembourg in 1968, Erik became world professional champion and Roger the amateur champion on the same day. Roger eventually took the professional title in 1975.

In 1968 De Vlaeminck rode the road race at the 1968 Summer Olympics in Mexico and finished 18th.

== Professional career ==
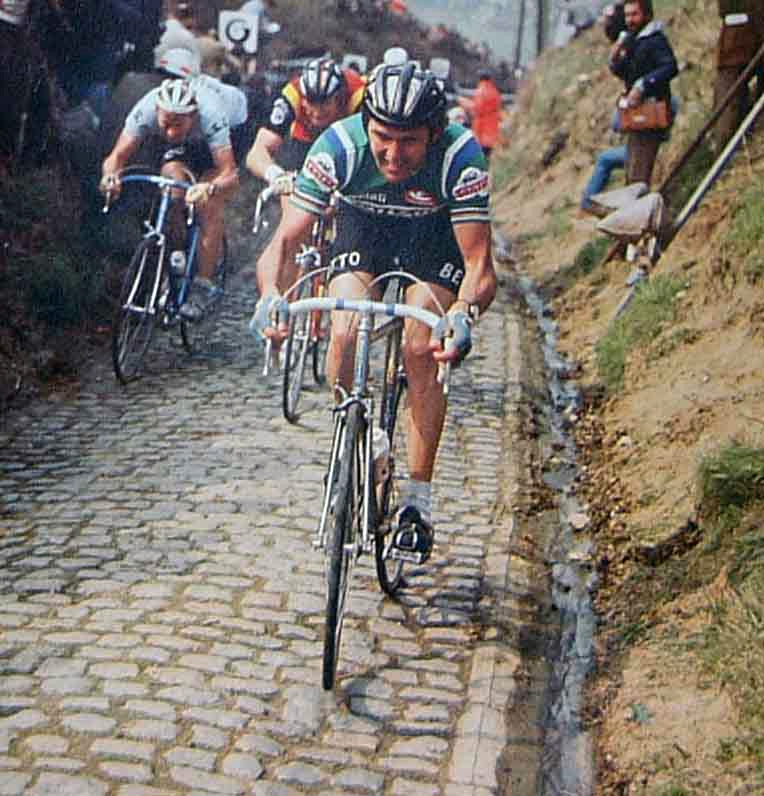
De Vlaeminck attempting to defend his Tour of Flanders title in 1978

De Vlaeminck turned professional at the start of the 1969 season with Flandria-Declerck and won the Omloop "Het Volk" in his first race. De Vlaeminck's career ran parallel with Eddy Merckx and he battled for ascendancy with Merckx throughout his career. De Vlaeminck rode Paris–Roubaix on 14 occasions, winning four times (1972, 1974, 1975, 1977), finished second four times, third once, fifth once, sixth once, seventh twice and abandoned only in 1980. His skills as a cyclo-cross rider made him an expert on the cobbles of northern France which the race crosses. De Vlaeminck used the early season Italian stage race Tirreno–Adriatico as training for the spring classics. He dominated the race between 1972 and 1977, winning every edition and taking 15 stages. His six victories are the most of all time and no other rider has won the race more than twice.

De Vlaeminck is one of only three riders to have won all five 'Monuments of Cycling' (i.e., Milan–San Remo, Tour of Flanders, Paris–Roubaix, Liège–Bastogne–Liège, and the Giro di Lombardia). The other two are fellow Belgians Rik van Looy and Eddy Merckx. In total De Vlaeminck won 11 Monument races, and finished in the top ten on an additional 25 occasions. The only major one-day race he did not win was the world road race championship, his best performance was second to Dutchman Hennie Kuiper in 1975.

He rode three Tours de France, winning stage 6 in 1970 between Amiens and Valenciennes. De Vlaeminck took the points jersey in the Giro d'Italia on three occasions as well as 22 stages overall including seven stages in 1975. He took a stage win in the Vuelta a España in his final season in 1984. His career lasted 15 years and he eventually had 259 road race victories. He always kept active in cyclo-cross, resulting in 70 cyclo-cross victories and a world title in 1975. De Vlaeminck also had a few successes on track, with several podium finishes in Six-Day races and a national Madison title in 1972 alongside Patrick Sercu. This makes him the only cyclist who won a Belgian national championship in road cycling, cyclo-cross and track cycling.

=== Rivalry with Merckx ===
In 1970, Rik Van Looy ended his career and many fans then focused on Roger De Vlaeminck as his successor. Another young rider who could succeed Van Looy was Eddy Merckx. When the professional careers of both riders had just started, De Vlaeminck always wanted to beat Merckx. He was even disappointed if someone else came in second, because then people could say he had no opposition. After racing against each other for a number of years, the two started to think differently about each other. De Vlaeminck gained respect for Merckx's performance and Merckx appreciated that his competitor always fought him with an open mind.

De Vlaeminck also believes that there were others who benefited from the competition between him and Merckx. He often restricted his competitor, but this cost so much strength that someone else took advantage of it. De Vlaeminck also says that he could have won some races if Merckx had not participated, but in other races he drove better because he never wanted to be inferior to his competitor.

Ultimately, De Vlaeminck named his son Eddy De Vlaeminck, after his competitor.

== Post-career ==
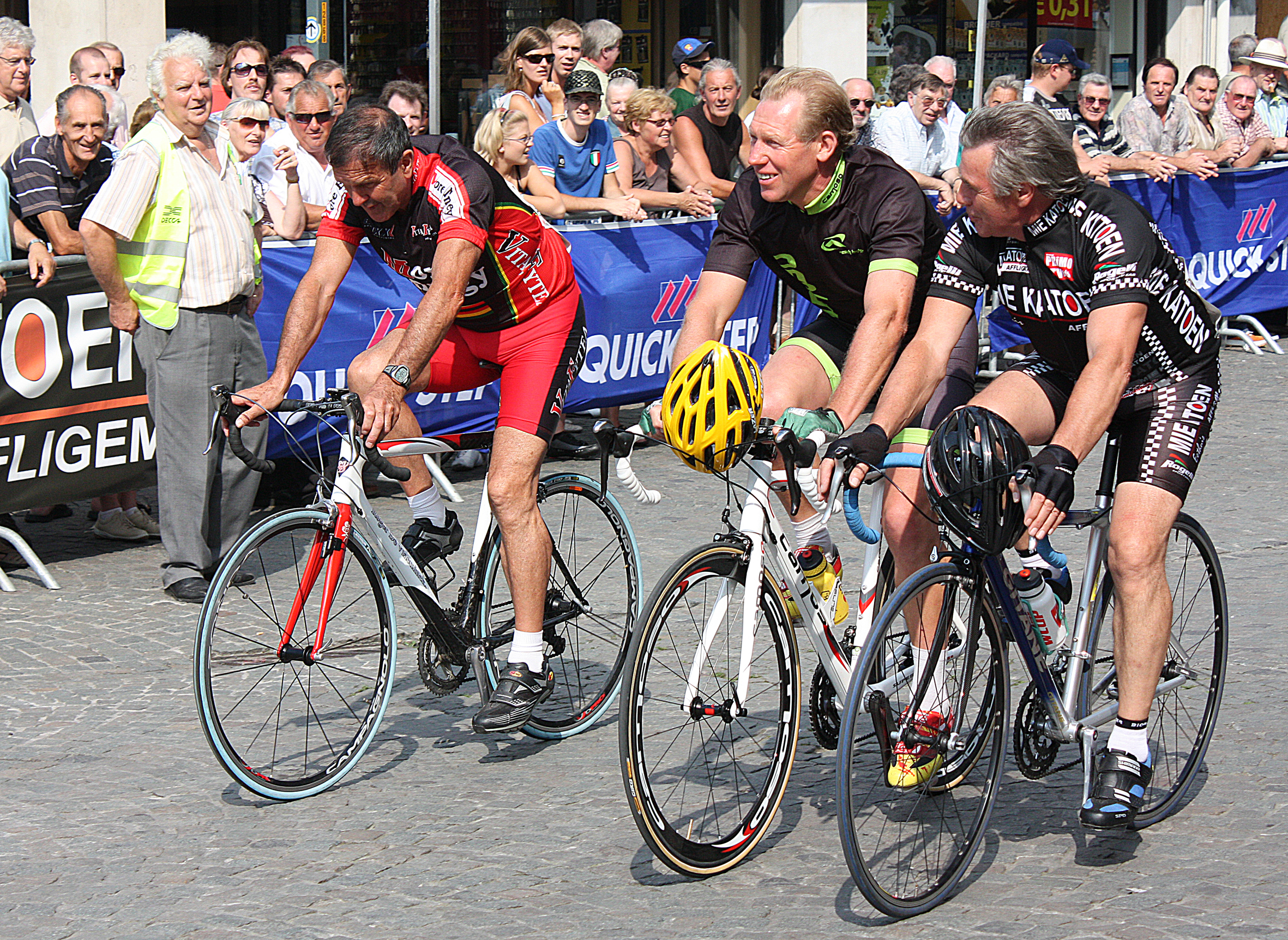
De Vlaeminck (left) with former professional cyclists Etienne De Wilde and Lucien Van Impe at a criterium in Aalst, Belgium in 2008

De Vlaeminck, who lives on a farm in Kaprijke, is still in cycling. He has been coaching cyclo-cross riders. In April 2004 he quit his job as coach to the John Saey-Deschacht team in Belgium to spend more time with his family, However he was tempted back to the sport in November 2004 as advisor to the Zimbabwe team as it prepared for the world championship in St. Wendel, Germany, at the end of January 2005.

De Vlaeminck is known for firm opinions about cycling and is often consulted by journalists. In particular, he criticizes the trend to have multiple leaders in a team. That, he says, means the best racers share important races between them. De Vlaeminck is also known for his harsh opinion of Tom Boonen, calling him unworthy of equaling his Paris–Roubaix record of 4 wins, claiming cycling is not as hard as it used to be. This led to the meme "In den tijd van Roger De Vlaeminck ..." ("in the days of Roger De Vlaeminck") where De Vlaeminck was attributed to doing all kinds of unrealistic stuff.

== Major results ==
=== Cyclo-cross ===
1967
2nd National Championships
1968
1st UCI World Amateur Championships
1st National Amateur Championships
1st Noordzeecross Middelkerke
1969
1st National Amateur Championships
1st Duinencross Koksijde
2nd UCI World Amateur Championships
2nd National Championships
1970
1st Vlaamse Druivenveldrit Overijse
3rd Jaarmarktcross Niel
1972
1st Duinencross Koksijde
1st Vlaamse Druivenveldrit Overijse
1974
1st National Championships
1st Vlaamse Druivenveldrit Overijse
2nd UCI World Championships
1975
1st UCI World Championships
1st National Championships
3rd Vlaamse Druivenveldrit Overijse
1978
1st National Championships
1st Vlaamse Druivenveldrit Overijse
1979
1st Superprestige Diegem
2nd National Championships
1981
1st Superprestige Diegem

=== Road ===
1966
4th Road race, UCI World Junior Championships
1967
1st Stage 4 Amateur Tour of Belgium
1st Stage 4 Tour de la province de Namur
3rd Road race, National Amateur Championships
7th Road race, UCI World Amateur Championships
1968
1st Road race, National Amateur Championships
1st Overall Amateur Tour of Belgium

1st Stage 8

1st Flèche Ardennaise
10th Overall Tour de l'Avenir

1st Points classification
1st Stages 10a & 10b (ITT)

1969 (5 pro wins)
1st Road race, National Championships
1st Omloop Het Volk
1st Brussels–Ingooigem
1st Baden-Baden (with Herman Vanspringel)
1st Stage 3 Tour of Belgium
2nd Milan–San Remo
2nd Gent–Wevelgem
2nd Scheldeprijs
2nd Omloop der Zennevallei
2nd Grote Prijs Jef Scherens
3rd GP Stad Vilvoorde
3rd Züri–Metzgete
3rd Overall Paris-Luxembourg
3rd Wattrelos-Meulebeke
5th Paris–Roubaix
6th Overall Tour de Luxembourg
6th La Flèche Wallonne
Tour de France

Held after Stages 7–8b
Held after Stages 1a–5

1970 (7)
1st Liège–Bastogne–Liège
1st Omloop der Beide Vlaanderen
1st Scheldeprijs
1st Druivenkoers Overijse
1st Omloop van het Houtland
Tour de France

1st Stage 6
Held after Stage 6

1st Prologue (TTT) Four Days of Dunkirk
2nd Paris–Roubaix
2nd E3 Prijs Vlaanderen
3rd Wattrelos-Meulebeke
3rd GP Roeselare
4th Overall Critérium du Dauphiné Libéré

1st Points classification
1st Stage 4

5th Paris–Tours
5th Circuit des Onze Villes
5th Brussels–Ingooigem
6th Coppa Agostoni
8th Omloop Het Volk
10th Omloop van het Zuidwesten
1971 (13)
1st Overall Four Days of Dunkirk

1st Stage 2

1st La Flèche Wallonne
1st E3 Prijs Vlaanderen
1st Omloop der Beide Vlaanderen
1st Omloop van het Zuidwesten
1st Omloop van de Westhoek
Tour de la Nouvelle France

1st Stage 1 & 4

2nd Gent–Wevelgem
3rd Overall Vuelta a Andalucía

1st Mountains classification
1st Prologue a & Stage 4

3rd Brabantse Pijl
4th Overall Tour de Suisse

1st Points classification
1st Stage 3

4th Circuit des Onze Villes
4th GP Union Dortmund
5th Herinneringsprijs Dokter Tistaert – Prijs Groot-Zottegem
7th Paris–Roubaix
7th Druivenkoers Overijse
8th Giro di Lombardia
10th Kampioenschap van Vlaanderen
Tour de France

Held after Stages 2–6b

1972 (13)
1st Overall Tirreno–Adriatico

1st Stages 4 & 5b

1st Paris–Roubaix
1st Milano–Torino
1st Druivenkoers Overijse
1st Coppa Placci
1st Gran Premio Città di Camaiore
1st Halse Pijl
1st Stage 1 Giro di Sardegna
3rd Grand Prix Pino Cerami
4th Paris–Tours
4th Trofeo Laigueglia
4th Coppa Agostoni
6th Giro di Puglia
6th GP Montelupo
7th Overall Giro d'Italia

1st Points classification
1st Stages 6, 15, 18 & 19a

7th Giro di Toscana
7th Giro del Lazio
8th Kampioenschap van Vlaanderen
9th Giro di Campania
10th Sassari-Cagliari
1973 (12)
1st Overall Tirreno–Adriatico

1st Mountains classification
1st Stage 5a

1st Milan–San Remo
1st Giro di Toscana
1st Trofeo Matteotti
1st Circuit de l'Aulne
1st Omloop van het Zuidwesten
1st Grand Prix de Monaco
Giro d'Italia

1st Stages 2, 11 & 13
Held after Stages 15–17

2nd Giro di Lombardia
2nd Paris–Tours
2nd Coppa Bernocchi
2nd Coppa Sabatini
2nd Omloop Het Volk
2nd Trofeo Laigueglia
2nd Omloop der Zennevallei
3rd Omloop van de Westhoek
3rd Milano–Torino
4th Road race, National Championships
4th Coppa Placci
6th Overall Giro di Sardegna

1st Stage 3 & 6

6th Coppa Placci
7th Paris–Roubaix
8th Brabantse Pijl
8th GP Union Dortmund
10th Gran Premio Città di Camaiore
1974 (11)
1st Overall Tirreno–Adriatico

1st Stage 5

1st Overall Giro di Sicilia
1st Paris–Roubaix
1st Giro di Lombardia
1st Druivenkoers Overijse
1st Giro del Veneto
1st Milano–Torino
1st Coppa Placci
Giro d'Italia

1st Points classification
1st Stage 4

1st Stage 2 Giro di Puglia
2nd La Flèche Wallonne
2nd Giro dell'Emilia
2nd Ronde van Limburg
2nd Paris–Brussels
2nd Giro della Provincia di Reggio Calabria
2nd GP Montelupo
3rd Milan–San Remo
3rd Gent–Wevelgem
3rd Circuit de l'Aulne
3rd Coppa Agostoni
3rd Grand Prix de Wallonie
3rd Gran Premio di Lugano
3rd Trofeo Baracchi (with Eddy Merckx)
4th Giro del Lazio
4th Trofeo Matteotti
4th Gran Premio Industria e Commercio di Prato
7th Paris–Tours
7th Critérium des As
8th Giro di Campania
9th Sassari-Cagliari
1975 (28)
1st Overall Tour de Suisse

1st Points classification
1st Prologue & Stages 1, 3, 5, 9a & 9b (ITT)

1st Overall Tirreno–Adriatico

1st Stages 2a, 4 & 5 (ITT)

1st Paris–Roubaix
1st Züri–Metzgete
1st Coppa Agostoni
1st GP Montelupo
1st Giro del Lazio
1st Trofeo Pantalica
1st Critérium des As
1st GP Industria & Artigianato di Larciano
1st Heusden Koers
2nd Road race, UCI World Championships
2nd Grote Prijs Marcel Kint
3rd Paris–Tours
3rd Milano–Torino
3rd Druivenkoers Overijse
3rd Trofeo Laigueglia
3rd Giro di Toscana
4th Road race, National Championships
4th Overall Giro d'Italia

1st Points classification
1st Stages 4, 6, 7b, 10, 11, 18 & 20

4th Giro di Lombardia
4th Scheldeprijs
4th Omloop Het Volk
6th Omloop van de Westhoek
5th Overall À travers Lausanne
5th Tre Valli Varesine
7th Giro dell'Emilia
8th Liège–Bastogne–Liège
9th La Flèche Wallonne
10th Overall Giro di Sardegna

1st Stages 1, 4 & 5b

1976 (22)
1st Overall Tirreno–Adriatico

1st Points classification
1st Stages 3, 4 & 5b (ITT)

1st Overall Giro di Sardegna

1st Stages 1b & 5

1st Giro di Lombardia
1st Giro dell'Emilia
1st Giro del Lazio
1st Coppa Agostoni
1st GP Montelupo
1st Sassari-Cagliari
Giro d'Italia

1st Stages 2, 5, 8 & 16
Held after Stages 2 & 4–5
Held after Stages 4–19

1st Stage 3 Giro di Puglia
2nd Overall Tour de Romandie

1st Points classification
1st Stage 5a

2nd Scheldeprijs
2nd Tre Valli Varesine
2nd Züri–Metzgete
2nd Trofeo Pantalica
2nd Giro delle Marche
3rd Paris–Roubaix
3rd Rund um den Henninger Turm
3rd Giro di Campania
4th Tour of Flanders
5th Overall Volta a Catalunya

1st Points classification
1st Prologue & Stages 2 & 4a

5th Coppa Placci
6th Gent–Wevelgem
6th E3 Prijs Vlaanderen
7th Gran Premio Industria e Commercio di Prato
8th Milan–San Remo
8th Giro della Provincia di Reggio Calabria
1977 (6)
1st Overall Tirreno–Adriatico

1st Stages 2 & 3

1st Paris–Roubaix
1st Tour of Flanders
1st Giro del Piemonte
2nd Milan–San Remo
2nd Giro del Veneto
2nd Giro di Toscana
4th Liège–Bastogne–Liège
4th Paris–Tours
4th Paris–Brussels
4th Critérium des As
5th Overall Giro di Sardegna
6th Amstel Gold Race
6th Coppa Bernocchi
8th Omloop Het Volk
7th Tre Valli Varesine
10th La Flèche Wallonne
1978 (7)
1st Milan–San Remo
1st Druivenkoers Overijse
1st Giro del Friuli
1st Sassari-Cagliari
Giro di Sardegna

1st Points classification
1st Stages 1 & 5

1st Stage 4 Giro di Puglia
2nd Paris–Roubaix
2nd Circuit de l'Aulne
3rd Giro del Lazio
4th Brussels–Ingooigem
5th Coppa Agostoni
6th Gent–Wevelgem
7th Overall Tour de l'Aude
8th Brabantse Pijl
8th Züri–Metzgete
9th Rund um den Henninger Turm
10th Road race, UCI World Championships
10th Tour of Flanders
Giro d'Italia

Held after Stages 7, 9 & 11b

1979 (14)
1st Overall Giro di Puglia

1st Stages 1, 2 & 3

1st Milan–San Remo
1st Omloop Het Volk
1st Milano–Vignola
1st Erpe-Mere
1st Gran Premio Bruno Beghelli
Giro d'Italia

1st Stages 2, 9 & 12
Held after Stages 11 & 12

Four Days of Dunkirk

1st Stages 4a & 5b

2nd Paris–Roubaix
2nd Gent–Wevelgem
2nd Giro del Friuli
3rd Overall Giro del Trentino

1st Stage 1

3rd Tre Valli Varesine
4th Züri–Metzgete
4th Trofeo Matteotti
4th Druivenkoers Overijse
4th Rund um den Henninger Turm
5th Trofeo Laigueglia
6th Overall Tirreno–Adriatico

1st Stage 5a

7th Coppa Agostoni
10th Road race, UCI World Championships
1980 (14)
1st Overall Vuelta a Mallorca

1st Prologue & Stages 1 & 4

1st Trofeo Laigueglia
1st Profronde van Stiphout
1st Heusden Koers
Tirreno–Adriatico

1st Stages 1 & 2

Deutschland Tour

1st Stages 1 & 2

1st Stage 1 Four Days of Dunkirk
4th Overall Giro di Sardegna

1st Stages 1, 2a, 4 & 5

4th Tour of Flanders
5th Milan–San Remo
5th Omloop Het Volk
5th Coppa Bernocchi
6th Grote Scheldeprijs
6th Coppa Agostoni
6th Herinneringsprijs Dokter Tistaert – Prijs Groot-Zottegem
7th Road race, UCI World Championships
1981 (7)
1st Road race, National Championships
1st Paris–Brussels
1st Brabantse Pijl
1st Profronde van Stiphout
1st Omloop van de Grensstreek
Tour de Suisse

1st Stages 2 & 3a

Paris–Nice

1st Stages 2a & 4

2nd Milan–San Remo
2nd Paris–Roubaix
2nd Gent–Wevelgem
2nd Amstel Gold Race
3rd Trofeo Laigueglia
4th E3 Prijs Vlaanderen
5th Kuurne–Brussels–Kuurne
6th Tour of Flanders
6th Kampioenschap van Vlaanderen
6th Herinneringsprijs Dokter Tistaert – Prijs Groot-Zottegem
7th Grand Prix de Fourmies
10th Druivenkoers Overijse
1982
2nd E3 Prijs Vlaanderen
6th Paris–Roubaix
7th Overall Three Days of De Panne
7th Liège–Bastogne–Liège
7th Trofeo Laigueglia
1983
2nd GP Dr. Eugeen Roggeman
1984 (3)
1st Giro di Campania
1st Stage 8 Vuelta a España
1st Stage 5 Settimana Internazionale di Coppi e Bartali
3rd Milano–Torino
3rd Giro della Provincia di Reggio Calabria
5th Grand Prix of Aargau Canton

==== Grand Tour general classification results timeline ====
| Grand Tour | 1969 | 1970 | 1971 | 1972 | 1973 | 1974 | 1975 | 1976 | 1977 | 1978 | 1979 | 1980 | 1981 | 1982 | 1983 | 1984 |
|---|---|---|---|---|---|---|---|---|---|---|---|---|---|---|---|---|
| Vuelta a España | — | — | — | — | — | — | — | — | — | — | — | — | — | — | — | DNF |
| Giro d'Italia | — | — | — | 7 | 11 | 11 | 4 | DNF | DNF | DNF | DNF | — | — | — | — | DNF |
| Tour de France | DNF | DNF | DNF | — | — | — | — | — | — | — | — | — | — | — | — | — |

==== Classics results timeline ====
| Monument | 1969 | 1970 | 1971 | 1972 | 1973 | 1974 | 1975 | 1976 | 1977 | 1978 | 1979 | 1980 | 1981 | 1982 | 1983 | 1984 |
|---|---|---|---|---|---|---|---|---|---|---|---|---|---|---|---|---|
| Milan–San Remo | 2 | — | — | 12 | 1 | 3 | 31 | 8 | 2 | 1 | 1 | 5 | 2 | 13 | — | — |
| Tour of Flanders | — | 13 | 17 | — | — | 29 | 11 | 4 | 1 | 10 | 12 | 4 | 6 | 25 | — | — |
| Paris–Roubaix | 5 | 2 | 7 | 1 | 7 | 1 | 1 | 3 | 1 | 2 | 2 | DNF | 2 | 6 | — | — |
| Liège–Bastogne–Liège | 22 | 1 | — | — | — | 11 | 8 | — | 4 | — | — | — | — | 7 | — | — |
| Giro di Lombardia | — | — | 8 | — | 2 | 1 | 4 | 1 | 15 | — | 15 | — | — | — | — | — |
| Classic | 1969 | 1970 | 1971 | 1972 | 1973 | 1974 | 1975 | 1976 | 1977 | 1978 | 1979 | 1980 | 1981 | 1982 | 1983 | 1984 |
| Omloop Het Volk | 1 | 8 | 33 | — | 2 | 26 | 4 | 19 | 8 | — | 1 | 4 | 6 | 38 | — | — |
| Amstel Gold Race | — | — | — | — | — | — | — | — | 6 | — | — | — | 2 | — | — | — |
| Gent–Wevelgem | 2 | 12 | 2 | 16 | — | 3 | — | 6 | — | 6 | 2 | 39 | 2 | 22 | — | — |
| La Flèche Wallonne | 6 | 15 | 1 | — | — | 2 | 9 | — | 10 | — | — | — | — | — | — | — |
| Züri-Metzgete | 3 | — | — | — | — | — | 1 | 2 | — | — | 8 | 4 | — | — | — | — |
| Paris–Brussels | Not held | | | | 13 | 2 | — | — | 4 | — | 12 | — | 1 | — | — | — |
| Paris–Tours | 30 | 5 | 22 | 4 | 2 | 7 | 3 | 16 | 4 | — | — | — | 50 | — | — | — |

==== Major championships results timeline ====
| | 1969 | 1970 | 1971 | 1972 | 1973 | 1974 | 1975 | 1976 | 1977 | 1978 | 1979 | 1980 | 1981 | 1982 | 1983 | 1984 |
|---|---|---|---|---|---|---|---|---|---|---|---|---|---|---|---|---|
| World Championships | 14 | 11 | 46 | 12 | 31 | DNF | 2 | — | DNF | 10 | 10 | 7 | DNF | — | — | — |
| National Championships | 1 | — | 8 | 11 | 4 | 8 | 4 | — | — | 17 | — | — | 1 | — | — | — |

Legend
| — | Did not compete |
| DNF | Did not finish |

=== Track ===
1970
2nd Six Days of Ghent (with Peter Post)
1971
1st Six Days of Ghent (with Patrick Sercu)
2nd Six Days of Brussels (with Patrick Sercu)
1972
1st Madison, National Championships (with Patrick Sercu)
1979
2nd Six Days of Antwerp (with Patrick Sercu and Rik Van Linden)
1980
1st Six Days of Antwerp (with René Pijnen and Wilfried Peffgen)
2nd Six Days of Milan (with Alfons De Wolf)
1982
1st Six Days of Antwerp (with Patrick Sercu)
3rd Six Days of Ghent (with Patrick Sercu)

=== Records ===
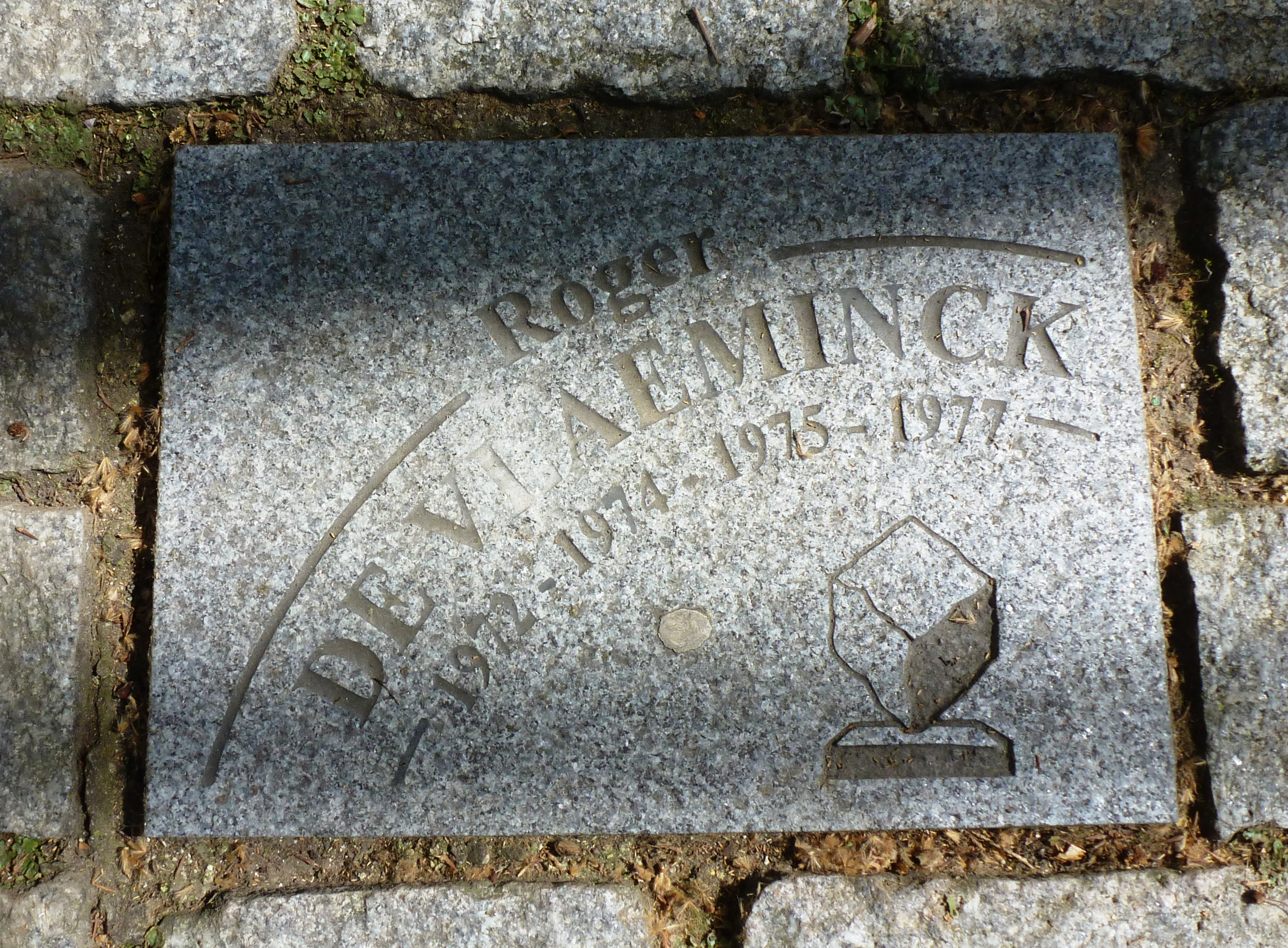
De Vlaeminck's paving stone on the Allée Ch. Crupelandt in Roubaix

- Most Tirreno–Adriatico wins: 6 in 1972, 1973, 1974, 1975, 1976 and 1977.
- Most Paris–Roubaix wins: 4 1972, 1974, 1975 and 1977 (record shared with Tom Boonen).
- Most Druivenkoers Overijse wins: 4 1970, 1972, 1974 and 1978 (record shared with Björn Leukemans).
- The only professional who won a national championship in road cycling (1969, 1981), cyclo-cross (1974, 1975, 1978) and track cycling (1972).

== Awards and honours ==
- Mendrisio d'Or: 1975
- Winner of 7 of the 8 original Classic cycle races (shared with Eddy Merckx). Rik van Looy won all 8.
- Union Cycliste Internationale Hall of Fame: 2002
- UCI Top 100: 19th place
- Procyclingstats.com – All Time Wins Ranking: 3rd place (161 wins, shared with Mario Chipollini)
- CyclingRanking – Overall ranking: 8th place

== See also ==
- List of riders with stage wins at all three cycling Grand Tours
- Belgium at the UCI Cyclo-cross World Championships
- Belgium at the UCI Road World Championships
- Cycling records
- A Sunday in Hell
