= 1976 Tirreno–Adriatico =

Race details
- Dates: 12–16 March 1976
- Stages: 5
- Distance: 882 km (548.0 mi)
- Winning time: 23h 39' 13"

Results
	Winner	Roger De Vlaeminck (BEL)	(Brooklyn)
	Second	Eddy Merckx (BEL)	(Molteni–Campagnolo)
	Third	Gianbattista Baronchelli (ITA)	(Scic)

The 1976 Tirreno–Adriatico was the 11th edition of the Tirreno–Adriatico cycle race and was held from 12 March to 16 March 1976. The race started in Santa Marinella and finished in San Benedetto del Tronto. The race was won by Roger De Vlaeminck of the Brooklyn team.

== General classification ==
Final general classification

Rank	Rider	Team	Time
1	Roger De Vlaeminck (BEL)	Brooklyn	23h 39' 13"
2	Eddy Merckx (BEL)	Molteni–Campagnolo	+ 53"
3	Gianbattista Baronchelli (ITA)	Scic	+ 1' 36"
4	Francesco Moser (ITA)	Sanson	+ 1' 53"
5	Giancarlo Bellini (ITA)	Brooklyn	+ 2' 05"
6	Wladimiro Panizza (ITA)	Scic	+ 2' 43"
7	Felice Gimondi (ITA)	Bianchi–Campagnolo	+ 3' 01"
8	Roberto Poggiali (ITA)	Sanson	+ 3' 26"
9	Franco Bitossi (ITA)	Zonca	+ 3' 27"
10	Giuseppe Perletto (ITA)	Magniflex–Torpado	+ 3' 46"
