= 1979 Omloop Het Volk =

Race details
- Dates: 3 March 1979
- Stages: 1
- Distance: 215 km (134 mi)
- Winning time: 5h 19' 20"

Results
	Winner	Roger De Vlaeminck (BEL)
	Second	Jan Raas (NED)
	Third	Frank Hoste (BEL)

The 1979 Omloop Het Volk was the 34th edition of the Omloop Het Volk cycle race and was held on 3 March 1979. The race started and finished in Ghent. The race was won by Roger De Vlaeminck.

== General classification ==
Final general classification
Rank	Rider	Time
1	Roger De Vlaeminck (BEL)	5h 19' 20"
2	Jan Raas (NED)	+ 0"
3	Frank Hoste (BEL)	+ 0"
4	Jos Schipper (NED)	+ 12"
5	Michel Pollentier (BEL)	+ 14"
6	Dietrich Thurau (FRG)	+ 16"
7	Alfons De Wolf (BEL)	+ 56"
8	Frits Pirard (NED)	+ 1' 42"
9	Marc Demeyer (BEL)	+ 1' 42"
10	Sean Kelly (IRL)	+ 1' 42"
