= 1969 La Flèche Wallonne =

Race details
- Dates: 20 April 1969
- Stages: 1
- Distance: 222 km (137.9 mi)
- Winning time: 5h 31' 00"

Results
	Winner	Jos Huysmans (BEL)	(Dr. Mann–Grundig)
	Second	Erik De Vlaeminck (BEL)	(Flandria–De Clerck–Krüger)
	Third	Eric Leman (BEL)	(Flandria–De Clerck–Krüger)

The 1969 La Flèche Wallonne was the 33rd edition of La Flèche Wallonne cycle race and was held on 20 April 1969. The race started in Liège and finished in Marcinelle. The race was won by Jos Huysmans of the Dr. Mann team.

== General classification ==
Final general classification

Rank	Rider	Team	Time
1	Jos Huysmans (BEL)	Dr. Mann–Grundig	5h 31' 00"
2	Erik De Vlaeminck (BEL)	Flandria–De Clerck–Krüger	+ 10"
3	Eric Leman (BEL)	Flandria–De Clerck–Krüger	+ 10"
4	Walter Godefroot (BEL)	Flandria–De Clerck–Krüger	+ 10"
5	Eddy Merckx (BEL)	Faema	+ 10"
6	Roger De Vlaeminck (BEL)	Flandria–De Clerck–Krüger	+ 10"
7	Roger Rosiers (BEL)	Dr. Mann–Grundig	+ 10"
8	Herman Van Springel (BEL)	Dr. Mann–Grundig	+ 10"
9	Georges Pintens (BEL)	Dr. Mann–Grundig	+ 10"
10	Victor Van Schil (BEL)	Faema	+ 10"
