= Ole Ritter =

Danish cyclist (born 1941)

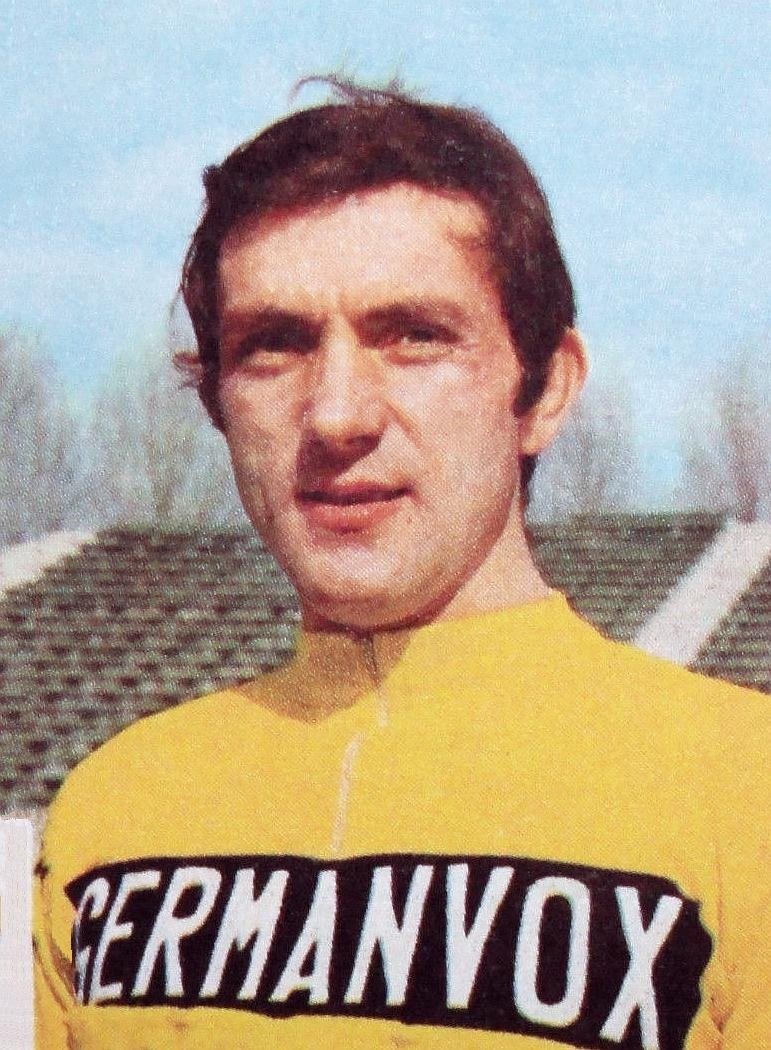
- Ole Ritter c. 1970

Personal information
- Full name: Ole Jørgen Phister Ritter
- Born: 29 August 1941 (age 85) Slagelse, Denmark
- Height: 1.78 m (5 ft 10 in)
- Weight: 74 kg (163 lb; 11 st 9 lb)

Cycling career
- Sport: Cycling
- Disciplines: Road & Track
- Role: Rider
- Rider type: Time trial

Professional teams
- 1967–1970: Germanvox–Wega
- 1971–1972: Dreher
- 1973: Bianchi–Campagnolo
- 1974–1977: Filotex

Major wins
- Grand Tours Giro d'Italia 3 individual stages (1967, 1969, 1971) One-day races and classics Gran Premio di Lugano (1970, 1974) Trofeo Matteotti (1968) Other Hour record 48.653 km (10 October 1968)
Medal record
Representing Denmark
World Championships
Silver medal – second place	1962 Salò	Amateur's road race
Silver medal – second place	1962 Salò	Team time trial

Ole Ritter (born 29 August 1941) is a Danish former racing cyclist, mainly known for breaking the hour record in 1968.

== Amateur years ==
As an amateur he rode for ABC Denmark. His breakthrough came in 1962 where he won 2 silver medals at the world championship in Italy, Individual & 100 km team time trial. Ritter took part in the 1964 Summer Olympics. He rode the individual road race and finished in 74th place, and was part of the Danish team in the team time trial that finished seventh.

He became Danish champion twice (1962 and 1966), and Scandinavian champion once (1966) and in 1965 went to Italy to break the world record on the 100 km.

== Professional years ==
In 1967 he became professional in Italy with the Germanvox-Wega team and his career took off. He won the individual time trial in the Giro d'Italia in front of Rudi Altig, Eddy Merckx and Jacques Anquetil. This time trial was just short of one hour, and Anquetil remarked that Ritter would have broken the hour record.

In 1968 he went to Mexico City before the Olympic Games, to accompany the Italian amateur cyclists and help them get used to the altitude. Since time on the track was scarce, the Italian team did not want to give Ritter much track time. On the day before the Olympics started, Ritter was allowed to ride in the morning, and he beat the hour record. He was the first rider to take the record at altitude since Willie Hamilton in 1898. He covered 48.653 km and it took four years and Eddy Merckx to beat it (49.431 km in 1972).

In 1974 at the age of 33 he went to Mexico again and beat his personal record twice in a week, with 48.739 and 48.879 km.

== Grand Tours ==
Ritter rode the Giro d'Italia nine times, and is the Danish rider with the best GC finish (seventh, in 1973) and the most stage wins (three). He rode the Tour de France just once, finishing 47th in 1975.

== Other achievements ==
Near the end of his career, Ritter again became a Danish cycling hero when six-day racing returned to the country. He won three races: in 1974 and 1975 in Herning with Dutchman Leo Duyndam and in 1977 in Forum with Belgian six-day star Patrick Sercu. Ritter's last sixth-day race was in Copenhagen in 1978.

== Films ==
Stars and Watercarriers (Danish: Stjernerne og vandbærerne), a 1974 film by Danish director Jørgen Leth, follows Ritter's fortunes in the 1973 Giro d'Italia. The film provides insight into a three-week stage race, dramatizing the roles and aims of different riders in the race. The heartbreak of the mountain stages, the intensity of the time trial (known as "the race of truth"), quiet moments on the road and the mundane daily signing-in are all part of the film. Ritter is featured in the time-trial segment, with his technical, physical and psychological preparations and later performance detailed to the accompaniment of a single, prolonged violin note.

A 1974 Danish documentary, The Impossible Hour (Danish: Den umulige time), explores Ritter's attempt to regain the one-hour distance record in Mexico City.

== Major Road Race Results ==
1967
1st Stage 16 (ITT) Giro d'Italia
3rd Giro del Lazio
3rd Milano–Vignola
9th Overall Tirreno–Adriatico
9th Trofeo Baracchi (with Eddy Beugels)
10th Coppa Bernocchi
1968
1st Trofeo Matteotti
2nd Giro della Provincia di Reggio Calabria
2nd Trofeo Baracchi (with Herman Van Springel)
3rd Milano–Vignola
8th Milano–Torino
10th Overall Giro di Sardegna
1969
1st Stage 17 Giro d'Italia
2nd Giro del Piemonte
2nd Gran Premio di Lugano (ITT)
2nd Trofeo Baracchi (with Gianni Motta)
3rd Stage 15 Giro d'Italia (ITT)
4th Giro dell'Emilia
4th Grand Prix des Nations (ITT)
5th Giro della Romagna
8th Gran Premio Città di Camaiore
9th Overall Giro di Sardegna

1st Stage 5b (ITT)

1970
1st Stage 2 Paris–Nice
1st Gran Premio di Lugano (ITT)
2nd Grand Prix des Nations (ITT)
2nd Trofeo Baracchi (with Leif Mortensen)
3rd Giro della Romagna
4th Trofeo Laigueglia
6th Giro di Lombardia
8th Overall Giro di Sardegna
9th Overall Giro d'Italia

2nd Stage 9 (ITT)

1971
1st Stage 20b (ITT) Giro d'Italia
2nd Stage 12 (ITT) Giro d'Italia
2nd Giro del Lazio
2nd Giro dell'Emilia
3rd Stage 4 Giro d'Italia
3rd Giro della Provincia di Reggio Calabria
3rd Giro della Romagna
4th Gran Premio Città di Camaiore
6th Trofeo Baracchi (with Gianni Motta)
7th Giro di Toscana
8th Gran Premio di Lugano (ITT)
9th Tour of Flanders
9th World Championships – Men's road race
9th Giro dell'Appennino
10th Overall Giro di Sardegna

1st Stage 4a (ITT)

10th Tre Valli Varesine
1972
3rd Stage 20 Giro d'Italia
3rd Gran Premio di Lugano (ITT)
4th Trofeo Baracchi (with Josef Fuchs)
8th Overall Tirreno–Adriatico
8th Giro dell'Emilia
9th Paris–Roubaix
10th Giro del Piemonte
1973
4th Overall Giro di Puglia
6th Overall Tirreno–Adriatico
7th Overall Giro d'Italia

2nd Stages 13 & 16 (ITT)
3rd Stages 6 & 19

7th Overall Tour de Romandie
7th Milano–Torino
1974
1st Gran Premio di Lugano (ITT)
2nd Overall Giro di Puglia

1st Stage 3

4th Giro dell'Emilia
5th Trofeo Matteotti
9th Giro di Lombardia
9th Overall Vuelta a Levante

1st Stage 2

1975
2nd Stage 18 (ITT) Tour de France
6th Overall Giro di Puglia
9th Gran Premio di Lugano (ITT)
1976
4th Overall Giro di Puglia
5th Giro della Provincia di Reggio Calabria
8th Giro di Campania

=== Grand Tour general classification results timeline ===
Grand Tour	1967	1968	1969	1970	1971	1972	1973	1974	1975	1976
Giro d'Italia	DNF	49	DNF	9	24	11	7	DNF	—	DNF
Tour de France	—	—	—	—	—	—	—	—	47	—
Vuelta a España	—	—	—	—	—	—	—	—	—	—

Legend
—	Did not compete
DNF	Did not finish

Records
Preceded by Ferdi Bracke	UCI hour record (48.653 km); 10 October 1968 – 25 October 1972	Succeeded by Eddy Merckx
