= 1979 Tirreno–Adriatico =

Race details
- Dates: 9–14 March 1979
- Stages: 5 + Prologue
- Distance: 915.5 km (568.9 mi)
- Winning time: 24h 40' 33"

Results
	Winner	Knut Knudsen (NOR)	(Bianchi–Faema)
	Second	Giuseppe Saronni (ITA)	(Scic–Bottecchia)
	Third	Giovanni Battaglin (ITA)	(Inoxpran)

The 1979 Tirreno–Adriatico was the 14th edition of the Tirreno–Adriatico cycle race and was held from 9 March to 14 March 1979. The race started in Santa Severa and finished in San Benedetto del Tronto. The race was won by Knut Knudsen of the Bianchi team.

== General classification ==
Final general classification

Rank	Rider	Team	Time
1	Knut Knudsen (NOR)	Bianchi–Faema	24h 40' 33"
2	Giuseppe Saronni (ITA)	Scic–Bottecchia	+ 1"
3	Giovanni Battaglin (ITA)	Inoxpran	+ 25"
4	Franco Conti (ITA)	San Giacomo	+ 34"
5	Francesco Moser (ITA)	Sanson–Luxor TV–Campagnolo	+ 36"
6	Roger De Vlaeminck (BEL)	Gis Gelati	+ 1' 10"
7	Michel Pollentier (BEL)	Splendor–Euro Soap	+ 1' 25"
8	Gianbattista Baronchelli (ITA)	Magniflex–Famcucine	+ 1' 33"
9	Alfons De Wolf (BEL)	Lano–Boule d'Or	+ 1' 48"
10	Wladimiro Panizza (ITA)	Sanson–Luxor TV–Campagnolo	+ 1' 50"
