= 1977 Tour de Romandie =

Race details
- Dates: 10–15 May 1977
- Stages: 5 + Prologue
- Distance: 774.7 km (481.4 mi)
- Winning time: 21h 02' 21"

Results
	Winner	Gianbattista Baronchelli (ITA)
	Second	Joop Zoetemelk (NED)
	Third	Knut Knudsen (NOR)

The 1977 Tour de Romandie was the 31st edition of the Tour de Romandie cycle race and was held from 10 May to 15 May 1977. The race started in Fribourg and finished in Geneva. The race was won by Gianbattista Baronchelli.

== General classification ==
Final general classification
Rank	Rider	Time
1	Gianbattista Baronchelli (ITA)	21h 02' 21"
2	Joop Zoetemelk (NED)	+ 1' 22"
3	Knut Knudsen (NOR)	+ 2' 43"
4	Felice Gimondi (ITA)	+ 3' 42"
5	Johan De Muynck (BEL)	+ 4' 23"
6	Raymond Delisle (FRA)	+ 4' 23"
7	Eddy Merckx (BEL)	+ 4' 38"
8	Lucien Van Impe (BEL)	+ 4' 45"
9	Giancarlo Bellini (ITA)	+ 4' 49"
10	Sean Kelly (IRL)	+ 4' 53"
