= 1979 Milan–San Remo =

Race details
- Dates: 17 March 1979
- Stages: 1
- Distance: 288 km (179 mi)
- Winning time: 7h 05' 44"

Results
	Winner	Roger De Vlaeminck (BEL)	(Gis Gelati)
	Second	Giuseppe Saronni (ITA)	(Scic–Bottecchia)
	Third	Knut Knudsen (NOR)	(Bianchi–Faema)

The 1979 Milan–San Remo was the 70th edition of the Milan–San Remo cycle race and was held on 17 March 1979. The race started in Milan and finished in San Remo. The race was won by Roger De Vlaeminck of the Gis Gelati team.

== General classification ==
Final general classification

Rank	Rider	Team	Time
1	Roger De Vlaeminck (BEL)	Gis Gelati	7h 05' 44"
2	Giuseppe Saronni (ITA)	Scic–Bottecchia	+ 0"
3	Knut Knudsen (NOR)	Bianchi–Faema	+ 0"
4	Francesco Moser (ITA)	Sanson–Luxor TV–Campagnolo	+ 0"
5	Giuseppe Martinelli (ITA)	San Giacomo–Mobilificio	+ 0"
6	Luciano Borgognoni (ITA)	CBM Fast–Gaggia	+ 0"
7	Bernard Hinault (FRA)	Renault–Gitane	+ 0"
8	Daniel Willems (BEL)	IJsboerke–Warncke Eis	+ 0"
9	Giovanni Mantovani (ITA)	Inoxpran	+ 0"
10	Mario Beccia (ITA)	Mecap–Hoonved	+ 0"
