= 1973 Paris–Tours =

Race details
- Dates: 30 September 1973
- Stages: 1
- Distance: 264 km (164.0 mi)
- Winning time: 6h 17' 10"

Results
	Winner	Rik Van Linden (BEL)
	Second	Roger De Vlaeminck (BEL)
	Third	Frans Verbeeck (BEL)

The 1973 Paris–Tours was the 67th edition of the Paris–Tours cycle race and was held on 30 September 1973. The race started in Paris and finished in Tours. The race was won by Rik Van Linden.

== General classification ==
Final general classification

Rank	Rider	Time
1	Rik Van Linden (BEL)	6h 17' 10"
2	Roger De Vlaeminck (BEL)	+ 0"
3	Frans Verbeeck (BEL)	+ 0"
4	Eric Leman (BEL)	+ 0"
5	Jack Mourioux (FRA)	+ 0"
6	Eddy Merckx (BEL)	+ 0"
7	Walter Godefroot (BEL)	+ 0"
8	Herman Van Springel (BEL)	+ 0"
9	Michel Pollentier (BEL)	+ 0"
10	Willy De Geest (BEL)	+ 0"
