= André Dierickx =

Belgian cyclist (born 1947)

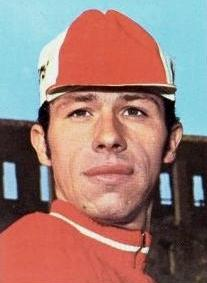
- Dierickx in 1971

Personal information
- Born: 29 October 1947 (age 78) Oudenaarde, Belgium

Cycling career
- Sport: Cycling
- Current team: Retired
- Discipline: Road
- Role: Rider
- Rider type: Classics specialist

Professional teams
- 1969: Peugeot–BP–Michelin
- 1970: Flandria–Mars
- 1971: Watney–Avia
- 1972–1973: Beaulieu–Flandria
- 1974: Merlin Plage–Shimano–Flandria
- 1975: Rokado
- 1976–1977: Maes Pils–Rokado
- 1978–1980: IJsboerke–Gios
- 1981: Safir–Ludo–Galli

Major wins
- One-day races and Classics La Flèche Wallonne (1973, 1975) Züri-Metzgete (1973) Grand Prix de Denain (1971) Stage races Tour de Luxembourg (1971) Tour of Belgium (1978)

André Dierickx (born 29 October 1947) is a Belgian former professional road racing cyclist who competed between 1969 and 1981. He competed in the individual road race at the 1968 Summer Olympics. He also won the La Flèche Wallonne in 1973 and 1975, the 1971 Tour de Luxembourg, the 1978 Tour of Belgium and the 1973 Züri-Metzgete among other races.

== Notable results ==
1968
1st Ronde van Vlaanderen Amateurs
1969
1st Stage 3a Tour de Romandie
1970
1st Grand Prix Cerami
1st Nokere Koerse
1st Grote Prijs Beeckman-De Caluwé
1st Omloop der Vlaamse Gewesten
1st De Kustpijl
1st Gullegem Koerse
1st Grote Prijs Dr. Eugeen Roggeman
1st Stage 1 Grand Prix du Midi Libre
2nd Grand Prix d'Isbergues
3rd Omloop Het Volk
3rd Amstel Gold Race
3rd Züri-Metzgete
3rd Le Samyn
4th Paris–Roubaix
7th Dwars door België
9th La Flèche Wallonne
1971
1st Overall Tour de Luxembourg

1st Stage 2

1st Overall Tour de l'Oise

1st Stage 2b

1st Grand Prix de Denain
1st Omloop van het Houtland
1st Stages 2 & 4 Critérium du Dauphiné Libéré
2nd Schaal Sels
3rd Overall Grand Prix du Midi Libre
1972
1st Stage 4a Paris–Nice
1st Stage 2 Tour of Belgium
2nd Paris–Roubaix
2nd Tour of Flanders
2nd Omloop Het Volk
6th Amstel Gold Race
7th E3 Prijs Vlaanderen
8th Milan–San Remo
1973
1st La Flèche Wallonne
1st Züri-Metzgete
1st Grote Prijs Dr. Eugeen Roggeman
5th Giro di Lombardia
6th Rund um den Henninger Turm
1974
1st Le Samyn
1st GP Stad Zottegem
2nd Omloop der Zennevallei
6th Paris–Roubaix
7th Züri-Metzgete
7th Rund um den Henninger Turm
8th La Flèche Wallonne
10th Paris–Tours
1975
1st La Flèche Wallonne
1st Grand Prix du canton d'Argovie
1st Grand Prix de Wallonie
1st Grote Prijs Beeckman-De Caluwé
1st Stage 1 Tour d'Indre-et-Loire
2nd Omloop van het Houtland
2nd GP Union Dortmund
3rd Paris–Roubaix
3rd Paris–Brussels
3rd Grand Prix de Denain
4th Amstel Gold Race
5th Liège–Bastogne–Liège
6th Overall Tour de Suisse
7th Gent–Wevelgem
6th Rund um den Henninger Turm
7th Omloop Het Volk
8th Züri-Metzgete
1976
1st GP Union Dortmund
1st Grote Prijs Beeckman-De Caluwé
8th La Flèche Wallonne
9th Gent–Wevelgem
10th Tour of Flanders
1977
1st Leeuwse Pijl
1st Grand Prix d'Antibes
1st Puivelde Koerse
1st Stage 1 Étoile de Bessèges
2nd Liège–Bastogne–Liège
2nd Tour du Condroz
3rd GP Stad Vilvoorde
4th Rund um den Henninger Turm
5th Züri-Metzgete
6th Gent–Wevelgem
1978
1st Overall Tour of Belgium
4th Omloop Het Volk
5th Paris–Tours
9th Road race, UCI Road World Championships
1979
1st Stage 8 Tour de Suisse
1st Prologue (TTT) Vuelta a Andalucía
2nd Paris–Brussels
1981
2nd Overall Three Days of De Panne
