= 1974 Paris–Tours =

Race details
- Dates: 29 September 1974
- Stages: 1
- Distance: 254.5 km (158.1 mi)
- Winning time: 5h 52' 55"

Results
	Winner	Francesco Moser (ITA)
	Second	Jean-Pierre Danguillaume (FRA)

The 1974 Paris–Tours was the 68th edition of the Paris–Tours cycle race and was held on 29 September 1974. The race started in Tours and finished in Versailles. The race was won by Francesco Moser.

== General classification ==
Final general classification

Rank	Rider	Time
~~1~~	~~Gerben Karstens (NED)~~	(Note: Disqualified for attempted fraud on a dope test.)
1	Francesco Moser (ITA)	5h 52' 55"
2	Jean-Pierre Danguillaume (FRA)	+ 14"
4	Eric Leman (BEL)	+ 18"
5	Freddy Maertens (BEL)	+ 18"
6	Frans Verbeeck (BEL)	+ 18"
7	Roger De Vlaeminck (BEL)	+ 18"
8	Rik Van Linden (BEL)	+ 18"
9	Bernard Bourreau (FRA)	+ 18"
10	André Dierickx (BEL)	+ 18"
