= Tirreno–Adriatico =

Italian multi-day road cycling race

Race details
- Date: Mid March
- Region: Central Italy
- English name: Tyrrhenian–Adriatic
- Local name: Tirreno–Adriatico (in Italian)
- Nickname(s): La corsa dei due mari (in Italian); The Race of the two Seas (in English)
- Discipline: Road
- Competition: UCI World Tour
- Type: Major one week stage race
- Organiser: RCS Sport – Gazzetta dello Sport
- Web site: www.tirrenoadriatico.it

History
- First edition: 1966
- Editions: 61 (as of 2026)
- First winner: Dino Zandegù (ITA)
- Most wins: Roger De Vlaeminck (BEL) (6 wins)
- Most recent: Isaac del Toro (MEX)

Tirreno–Adriatico, nicknamed the "Race of the Two Seas", is an elite road cycling stage race in Italy, run between the Tyrrhenian and Adriatic coasts. Traditionally held in the early part of the season, and usually counter-programmed with the Paris-Nice/'Race to the Sun', it is considered to be an important preparation for the Giro d'Italia. It is part of the UCI World Tour, cycling's highest level of professional men's races.

First held in 1966, the race was held over three stages. Since 2002 it is held over seven stages. Except for the first edition, the last stage has always finished in San Benedetto del Tronto on the Adriatic Seaside. Belgian Roger De Vlaeminck holds the record for most wins with six consecutive victories in the 1970s. Italian Francesco Moser also finished six times on the podium and won the race twice.

== History ==
The Tirreno–Adriatico was created in 1966 by the Lazio-based cycling club Forze Sportive Romane. As all the illustrious Italian cycling races were held in Northern Italy, the race was named "Tre Giorni del Sud" (English: Three days of the South). The first edition was a three-day race, starting on 11 March 1966 in Rome and finishing two days later in Pescara. Dino Zandegù won the inaugural edition. In 1967 the second edition was run over five stages, won by Franco Bitossi.

In the 1970s the young race manifested itself as an ideal preparation race for the monument classic Milan–San Remo which was run one week later. Belgian classics specialist Roger De Vlaeminck monopolized the race with six consecutive wins. After De Vlaeminck's reign, the race was the scene of the rivalry between Italian cycling icons Giuseppe Saronni and Francesco Moser, each winning the event twice.

From 1984 to 2001 the race grew to an event raced over six to eight stages and the location shifted more towards northern Central Italy. Swiss time trial specialist Tony Rominger and Danish rider Rolf Sørensen won the race twice in the 1990s.

Since 2002 the Tirreno–Adriatico is raced over seven stages, starting on Italy's western, Tyrrhenian seashore and finishing in San Benedetto del Tronto on the Adriatic Sea. In 2005 it was included in the inaugural UCI ProTour calendar, but was reclassified in 2008 as a continental tour event when organizer RCS Sport withdrew all its events from the UCI's premier calendar. Since 2011 it is part of the UCI World Tour.

In recent years the race regularly includes mountain stages in the Apennines and many Grand Tours specialists use it as an early-season test towards the stage races later in the year. Tour de France winners Vincenzo Nibali, Cadel Evans and Alberto Contador feature on the roll of honour of the Tirreno since 2010. Colombian climber Nairo Quintana won the 50th edition in 2015 and again in 2017.

The 2020 event was postponed due to the COVID-19 pandemic and held in September.

== Route ==
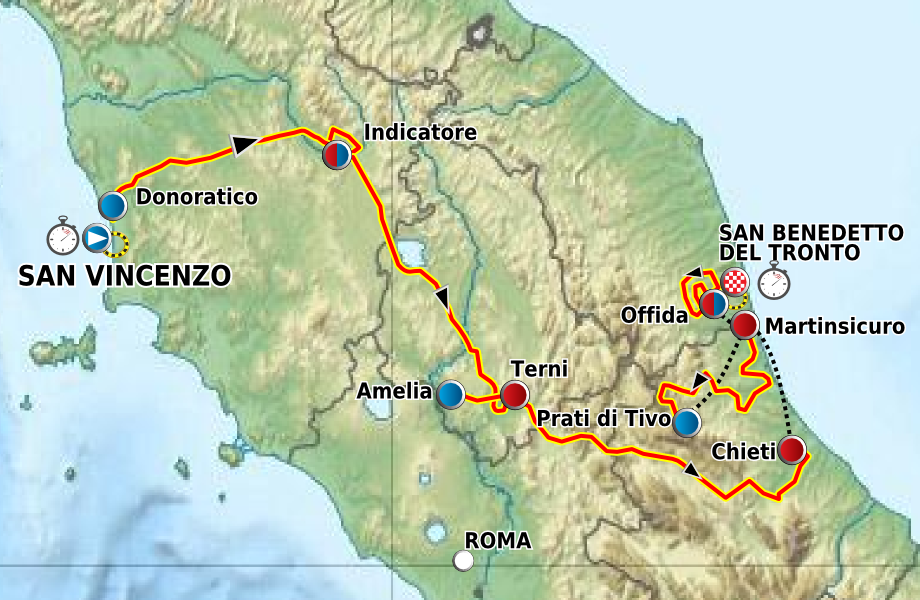
Route of the 2012 Tirreno–Adriatico

In its early years Tirreno–Adriatico often started close to Rome and even Naples. Since the 1990s the start is usually higher up in seaside resorts on the Tuscan coast of the Tyrrhenian Sea, before crossing the spine of the Italian Peninsula to its eastern coast on the Adriatic Sea. Raced over seven days, there are several stages for sprinters, some for climbers, usually one or two time trials and at least one uphill sprint finish for puncheurs.

The route of the 2015 edition is exemplary for the trend to suit stage racers. In recent years the race starts on Wednesday with a short team time trial or prologue and continues with stages for the sprinters and a stage ending in a short hilltop finish. The middle stages – raced over the weekend – are the high mountain stages of the event. In 2015, the Saturday stage ended with a 14 km climb towards the top of Selva Rotonda before the Sunday stage which ended in an uphill finish with slopes of more than 25%. The Tirreno finishes midweek, on Tuesday, in San Benedetto del Tronto in the province of Ascoli Piceno, in the Marche region.

== Trophy and leader's jersey ==
Since 2010, the overall winner of Tirreno–Adriatico is presented with a large gilded trident, the weapon associated with Neptune, the Roman god of the sea. Owing to the event's coast-to-coast format, it is officially named the Sea Master Trophy. In the days preceding the race, the trophy is ceremonially raised from the Tyrrhenian Sea by divers of the Italian Coast Guard. In keeping with the marine theme, the general classification leader's jersey is blue.

== Winners ==
Year	Winner	Stages	Distance (km)
1966	Dino Zandegù (ITA)	3	604
1967	Franco Bitossi (ITA)	5	1,068
1968	Claudio Michelotto (ITA)	5	1,037
1969	Carlo Chiappano (ITA)	5	946
1970	Antoon Houbrechts (BEL)	5	913
1971	Italo Zilioli (ITA)	5	985
1972	Roger De Vlaeminck (BEL)	5	884
1973	Roger De Vlaeminck (BEL)	5	582
1974	Roger De Vlaeminck (BEL)	5	781
1975	Roger De Vlaeminck (BEL)	5	816
1976	Roger De Vlaeminck (BEL)	5	882
1977	Roger De Vlaeminck (BEL)	5	809
1978	Giuseppe Saronni (ITA)	5	864
1979	Knut Knudsen (NOR)	5	916
1980	Francesco Moser (ITA)	5	814
1981	Francesco Moser (ITA)	5	835
1982	Giuseppe Saronni (ITA)	5	820
1983	Roberto Visentini (ITA)	5	857
1984	Tommy Prim (SWE)	6	1,043
1985	Joop Zoetemelk (NED)	6	1,011
1986	Luciano Rabottini (ITA)	6	981
1987	Rolf Sørensen (DEN)	6	936
1988	Erich Mächler (SUI)	6	930
1989	Tony Rominger (SUI)	7	1,071
1990	Tony Rominger (SUI)	8	1,041
1991	Herminio Díaz-Zabala (ESP)	8	1,317
1992	Rolf Sørensen (DEN)	8	1,166
1993	Maurizio Fondriest (ITA)	8	1,431
1994	Giorgio Furlan (ITA)	8	1,316
1995	Stefano Colagé (ITA)	8	1,422
1996	Francesco Casagrande (ITA)	8	1,370
1997	Roberto Petito (ITA)	8	1,162
1998	Rolf Järmann (SUI)	8	1,437
1999	Michele Bartoli (ITA)	8	1,412
2000	Abraham Olano (ESP)	8	1,249
2001	Davide Rebellin (ITA)	8	1,155
2002	Erik Dekker (NED)	7	1,049
2003	Filippo Pozzato (ITA)	7	1,235
2004	Paolo Bettini (ITA)	7	1,228
2005	Óscar Freire (ESP)	7	1,214
2006	Thomas Dekker (NED)	7	1,108
2007	Andreas Klöden (GER)	7	1,097
2008	Fabian Cancellara (SUI)	7	1,122
2009	Michele Scarponi (ITA)	7	1,095
2010	Stefano Garzelli (ITA)	7	1,229
2011	Cadel Evans (AUS)	7	1,075
2012	Vincenzo Nibali (ITA)	7	1,063
2013	Vincenzo Nibali (ITA)	7	1,060
2014	Alberto Contador (ESP)	7	1,034
2015	Nairo Quintana (COL)	7	1,006
2016	Greg Van Avermaet (BEL)	6	851
2017	Nairo Quintana (COL)	7	1,030.7
2018	Michał Kwiatkowski (POL)	7	992.5
2019	Primož Roglič (SLO)	7	1,048.5
2020	Simon Yates (GBR)	8	1,138.1
2021	Tadej Pogačar (SLO)	7	1,104.1
2022	Tadej Pogačar (SLO)	7	1,133.9
2023	Primož Roglič (SLO)	7	1,170.5
2024	Jonas Vingegaard (DEN)	7	1,119.0
2025	Juan Ayuso (ESP)	7	1,147.5
2026	Isaac del Toro (MEX)	7	1,165.5

=== Multiple winners ===
Wins	Rider	Editions
6	Roger De Vlaeminck (BEL)	1972, 1973, 1974, 1975, 1976, 1977
2	Giuseppe Saronni (ITA)	1978, 1982
2	Francesco Moser (ITA)	1980, 1981
2	Rolf Sørensen (DEN)	1987, 1992
2	Tony Rominger (SUI)	1989, 1990
2	Vincenzo Nibali (ITA)	2012, 2013
2	Nairo Quintana (COL)	2015, 2017
2	Primož Roglič (SLO)	2019, 2023
2	Tadej Pogačar (SLO)	2021, 2022

=== Wins per country ===
Wins	Country
24	Italy
8	Belgium
5	Switzerland; Spain
4	Slovenia
3	Denmark; Netherlands
2	Colombia
1	Australia; Germany; Great Britain; Mexico; Norway; Poland; Sweden
