= 1979 Giro del Trentino =

Race details
- Dates: 27 February–1 March 1979
- Stages: 2 + Prologue
- Distance: 289.5 km (179.9 mi)
- Winning time: 7h 19' 01"

Results
	Winner	Knut Knudsen (NOR)
	Second	Francesco Moser (ITA)
	Third	Roger De Vlaeminck (BEL)

The 1979 Giro del Trentino was the third edition of the Tour of the Alps cycle race and was held on 27 February to 1 March 1979. The race started and finished in Riva del Garda. The race was won by Knut Knudsen.

== General classification ==
Final general classification

Rank	Rider	Time
1	Knut Knudsen (NOR)	7h 19' 01"
2	Francesco Moser (ITA)	+ 2"
3	Roger De Vlaeminck (BEL)	+ 6"
4	Alfredo Chinetti (ITA)	+ 30"
5	Roberto Visentini (ITA)	+ 31"
6	Vittorio Algeri (ITA)	+ 58"
7	Wladimiro Panizza (ITA)	+ 1' 19"
8	Dante Morandi (ITA)	+ 1' 24"
9	Giuseppe Favero (ITA)	+ 1' 27"
10	Pietro Algeri (ITA)	+ 1' 28"
