= 1980 Omloop Het Volk =

Race details
- Dates: 1 March 1980
- Stages: 1
- Distance: 216 km (134 mi)
- Winning time: 5h 26' 00"

Results
	Winner	Joseph Bruyère (BEL)
	Second	Walter Planckaert (BEL)
	Third	Sean Kelly (IRL)

The 1980 Omloop Het Volk was the 35th edition of the Omloop Het Volk cycle race and was held on 1 March 1980. The race started and finished in Ghent. The race was won by Joseph Bruyère.

== General classification ==
Final general classification
Rank	Rider	Time
1	Joseph Bruyère (BEL)	5h 26' 00"
2	Walter Planckaert (BEL)	+ 6"
3	Sean Kelly (IRL)	+ 6"
4	Jan Raas (NED)	+ 6"
5	Roger De Vlaeminck (BEL)	+ 6"
6	Fons van Katwijk (NED)	+ 6"
7	Alfons De Wolf (BEL)	+ 6"
8	Jean-Luc Vandenbroucke (BEL)	+ 6"
9	Marc Demeyer (BEL)	+ 6"
10	Guido Van Calster (BEL)	+ 6"
