= 1976 Tour de Romandie =

Race details
- Dates: 4–9 May 1976
- Stages: 5 + Prologue
- Distance: 800.3 km (497.3 mi)
- Winning time: 23h 25' 53"

Results
	Winner	Johan De Muynck (BEL)
	Second	Roger De Vlaeminck (BEL)
	Third	Eddy Merckx (BEL)

The 1976 Tour de Romandie was the 30th edition of the Tour de Romandie cycle race and was held from 4 May to 9 May 1976. The race started in Geneva and finished in Fribourg. The race was won by Johan De Muynck.

== General classification ==
Final general classification
Rank	Rider	Time
1	Johan De Muynck (BEL)	23h 25' 53"
2	Roger De Vlaeminck (BEL)	+ 2' 51"
3	Eddy Merckx (BEL)	+ 2' 58"
4	Raymond Delisle (FRA)	+ 4' 56"
5	Roland Salm (SUI)	+ 5' 17"
6	Giovanni Battaglin (ITA)	+ 8' 12"
7	Juan Pujol Pagés (ESP)	+ 8' 15"
8	Giancarlo Bellini (ITA)	+ 9' 24"
9	Ronald De Witte (BEL)	+ 10' 09"
10	Ueli Sutter (SUI)	+ 10' 42"
