= 1977 Tirreno–Adriatico =

Race details
- Dates: 12–16 March 1977
- Stages: 5
- Distance: 808.5 km (502.4 mi)
- Winning time: 22h 06' 32"

Results
	Winner	Roger De Vlaeminck (BEL)	(Brooklyn)
	Second	Francesco Moser (ITA)	(Sanson)
	Third	Giuseppe Saronni (ITA)	(Scic)

The 1977 Tirreno–Adriatico was the 12th edition of the Tirreno–Adriatico cycle race and was held from 12 March to 16 March 1977. The race started in Ferentino and finished in San Benedetto del Tronto. The race was won by Roger De Vlaeminck of the Brooklyn team.

== General classification ==
Final general classification

Rank	Rider	Team	Time
1	Roger De Vlaeminck (BEL)	Brooklyn	22h 06' 32"
2	Francesco Moser (ITA)	Sanson	+ 5"
3	Giuseppe Saronni (ITA)	Scic	+ 32"
4	Alfio Vandi (ITA)	Magniflex–Torpado	+ 58"
5	Josef Fuchs (SUI)	Sanson	+ 1' 46"
6	Gianbattista Baronchelli (ITA)	Scic	+ 1' 55"
7	Claudio Bortolotto (ITA)	Sanson	+ 2' 08"
8	Giovanni Battaglin (ITA)	Jollj Ceramica	+ 2' 09"
9	Wladimiro Panizza (ITA)	Scic	+ 2' 14"
10	Remo Rocchia (ITA)	Vibor	+ 2' 24"
