= 1972 Paris–Roubaix =

Race details
- Dates: April 16, 1972
- Stages: 1
- Distance: 272 km (169 mi)
- Winning time: 7h 24' 05"

Results
	Winner	Roger De Vlaeminck (BEL)	(Dreher)
	Second	André Dierickx (BEL)	(Beaulieu-Flandria)
	Third	Barry Hoban (GBR)	(Gan - Mercier)

The 1972 Paris–Roubaix, the 70th edition of the Paris–Roubaix race taking place on 16 April 1972, marked the real beginning of Roger De Vlaeminck's mastery of the cobbles of the north. De Vlaeminck had already placed second two years earlier, but in 1972 there was no stopping Mr. Paris-Roubaix.

Most of the race were undertaken under terrible weather condition with low temperatures and rain. The usual spectacle in the Arenberg Forest was there once more, and this year enhanced by the conditions that made the passage very difficult. A massive 40 rider crash took amongst others Eddy Merckx down. Due to the harshness of the weather and the scrutinizing pace in the Arenberg forest just 49 of the starting 160 riders finished the race.

After the crashes in the Arenberg forest a 17 rider group formed with De Vlaeminck pushing the pace and gradually dropping riders on the cobbled sections. With 50 km to go Willy Van Malderghem and Alain Santy broke away and at one time held almost a two-minute lead. On his own De Vlaeminck caught first Santy, then Van Malderghem and proceeded alone onto the velodrome in Roubaix with a convincing margin of nearly two minutes.

== Results ==
Places 1-10

=== 1972: Paris(Compiègne)–Roubaix, 272.5km ===
	Cyclist	Time
1	Roger De Vlaeminck (BEL)	7h 24'05"
2	André Dierickx (BEL)	at 1'57
3	Barry Hoban (GBR)	at 2'13
4	Willy Teirlinck (BEL)	at 2'34
5	Willy Van Malderghem (BEL)	at 2'36
6	Gustaaf Van Roosbroeck (BEL)	at 2'39
7	Eddy Merckx (BEL)	s.t.
8	Eddy Peelman (BEL)	s.t.
9	Ole Ritter (DEN)	s.t.
10	Raymond Poulidor (FRA)	s.t.
