= Marcello Bergamo =

Italian cyclist

Personal information
- Full name: Marcello Bergamo
- Born: 16 December 1946 Ponte di Piave, Italy

Cycling career
- Sport: Cycling
- Discipline: Road
- Role: Rider

Major wins
- Milano–Torino (1973); Giro di Campania (1974)

Marcello Bergamo (born 16 December 1946 in Ponte di Piave, Veneto) is a retired Italian cyclist, who rode as a professional from 1969 until 1978.

Presently he runs the sports clothing company Bergamo Maglifico Sportivo.

== Career ==
His best results are victories in Milano–Torino in 1973 and two stages in the Tour de Romandie in 1971 and 1973. He also achieved podium finishes in the Italian semi-classics Giro dell'Emilia, Giro del Piemonte, and Giro del Lazio. The most successful years of his career he rode for the cycling team Filotex.

=== Palmares ===
Year	Competition	Result
1972	Giro del Lazio	2nd
1972	Giro di Campania	3rd
1973	Milano–Torino	1st
1973	Tre Valli Varesine	2nd
1973	Giro dell'Emilia	2nd
1973	Giro del Piemonte	2nd
1973	Giro di Lombardia	4th
1974	Milano–Torino	2nd
1974	Giro di Campania	1st
1976	Züri-Metzgete	5th
1977	Giro di Campania	2nd
