= 1972 Tirreno–Adriatico =

Race details
- Dates: 11–15 March 1972
- Stages: 5
- Distance: 884 km (549.3 mi)
- Winning time: 23h 46' 52"

Results
	Winner	Roger De Vlaeminck (BEL)
	Second	Josef Fuchs (SUI)
	Third	Tomas Pettersson (SWE)

The 1972 Tirreno–Adriatico was the seventh edition of the Tirreno–Adriatico cycle race and was held from 11 March to 15 March 1972. The race started in Ladispoli and finished in San Benedetto del Tronto. The race was won by Roger De Vlaeminck.

== General classification ==
Final general classification

Rank	Rider	Time
1	Roger De Vlaeminck (BEL)	23h 46' 52"
2	Josef Fuchs (SUI)	+ 12"
3	Tomas Pettersson (SWE)	+ 31"
4	Frans Verbeeck (BEL)	+ 47"
5	Noël Van Clooster (BEL)	+ 1' 14"
6	Felice Gimondi (ITA)	+ 1' 32"
7	Davide Boifava (ITA)	+ 1' 41"
8	Ole Ritter (DEN)	+ 1' 41"
9	Gösta Pettersson (SWE)	+ 2' 00"
10	Antoine Houbrechts (BEL)	+ 2' 02"
