= Daniel Van Ryckeghem =

Belgian cyclist

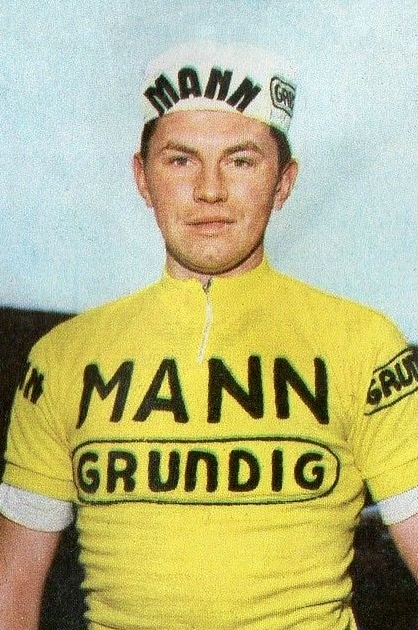
- Van Ryckeghem c. 1970

Personal information
- Full name: Daniel Van Ryckeghem
- Born: 29 May 1945 Meulebeke, Belgium
- Died: 26 May 2008 (aged 62) Meulebeke, Belgium

Cycling career
- Sport: Cycling
- Discipline: Road
- Role: Rider

Daniel Van Ryckeghem (29 May 1945 – 26 May 2008) was a Belgian professional road bicycle racer.

== Major results ==
1966
1st GP Briek Schotte
1st Stage 3 Tour du Nord
2nd Kampioenschap van Vlaanderen
3rd Grand Prix d'Isbergues
1967
1st Ruddervoorde Koerse
Volta a Catalunya

1st Points classification
1st Stages 2, 6 & 10

Tour de Suisse

1st Points classification
1st Stage 1

1st Wortegem
1st Halle–Ingooigem
1st Dwars door Vlaanderen
1st Kuurne–Brussels–Kuurne
1st Rund um den Henninger-Turm
1st Omloop der Zuid-West-Vlaamse Bergen
1st Stage 1 (TTT) Tour of Belgium
3rd Overall Tweedaagse van Bertrix
3rd Omloop van het Houtland
3rd Brussel-Bever
3rd Wattrelos-Meulebeke

1st Stage 1

6th Road race, UCI Road World Championships
1968
Tour de France:

1st stages 3 (TTT), 8 & 11

Tour de Suisse

1st Points classification
1st Stage 3 & 10

1st Omloop van het Zuidwesten
7th Overall Four Days of Dunkirk

1st Stage 1

1st Gavere
1st Moorslede
1st Arras
1st Beernem

2nd Kuurne–Brussels–Kuurne
3rd Amstel Gold Race

3rd Wattrelos-Meulebeke
3rd Omloop der Vlaamse Gewesten
1969
1st Omloop van de Grensstreek
1st Leeuwse Pijl
1st Omloop van Oost-Vlaanderen
1st Deinze
1st Hooglede
3rd Circuit de la Region Liniere
2nd GP de Denain
2nd Omloop Het Volk
5th Overall Tour du Nord

1st Stage 5

1970
1st Dwars door Vlaanderen
1st E3 Prijs Vlaanderen
1st Elfstedenronde
1st Nationale Sluitingsprijs
1st Stage 1 Critérium du Dauphiné Libéré
2nd Omloop van het Houtland
3rd Kuurne–Brussels–Kuurne
3rd Omloop van het Waasland
1971
1st Grand Prix d'Isbergues
1st Ruiselede
1st Lokeren
3rd Circuit de la Region Liniere
3rd Circuit du Port de Dunkerque
1972
3rd Étoile de Bessèges
