= Brooklyn (cycling team) =

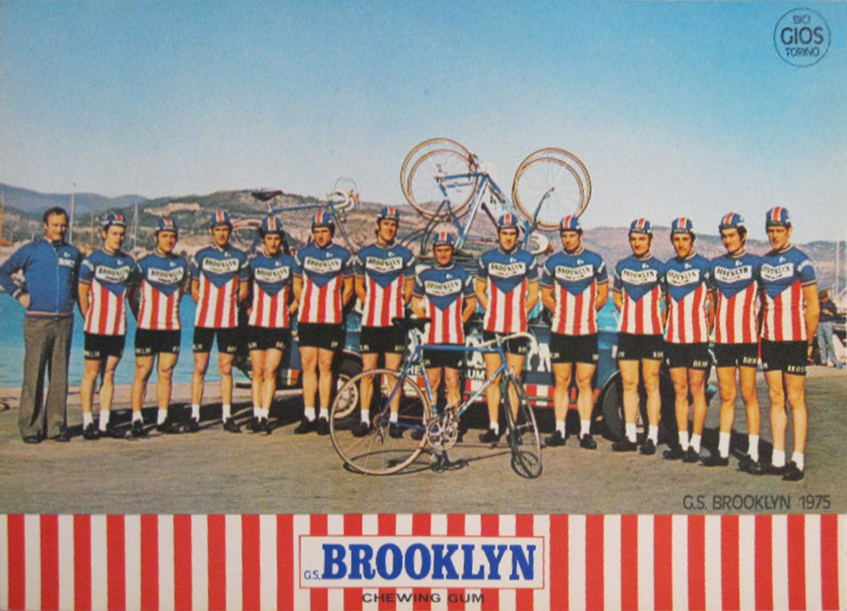
- The Brooklyn team of 1975

Team information
- Registered: Italy
- Founded: 1970
- Disbanded: 1977
- Discipline: Road

Team name history
- 1970–1972 1973–1977: Dreher; Brooklyn
Brooklyn jersey
Jersey

Brooklyn was an Italian professional cycling team that existed from 1973 to 1977. It was a mainly a one-day classics team and featured riders such as Roger De Vlaeminck, who won Paris–Roubaix four times. For the first three seasons it was sponsored by the Italian beer Dreher, and then for the following seasons by Italy's Brooklyn Chewing Gum.

Brooklyn won the Giro d'Italia team classification in 1975 and 1976.

The documentary film A Sunday in Hell features the team during the 1976 Paris–Roubaix.
