= Freddy Maertens =

Belgian cyclist (born 1952)

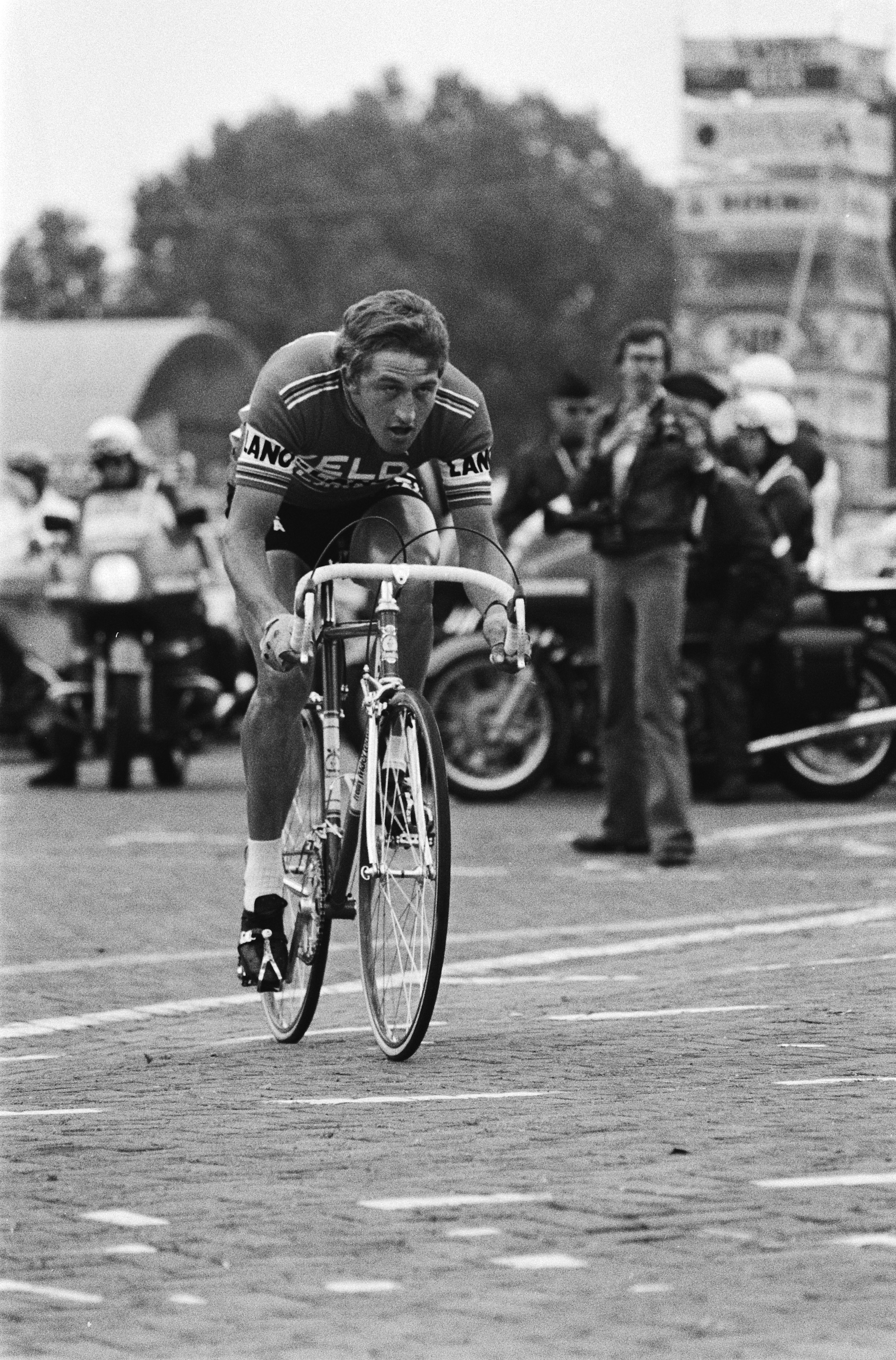
- Maertens in the 1978 Tour de France prologue

Personal information
- Full name: Freddy Maertens
- Born: 13 February 1952 (age 74) Nieuwpoort, Belgium

Cycling career
- Sport: Cycling
- Discipline: Road
- Role: Rider
- Rider type: All-rounder

Professional teams
- 1973–1979: Flandria–Carpenter–Shimano
- 1980: San Giacomo–Benotto
- 1981–1982: Boule d'Or–Sunair
- 1983: Masta–Concorde
- 1984: Splendor–Jacky Aernoudt Meubelen
- 1984: AVP–Viditel
- 1985: Nikon–Van Schilt
- 1985: Eurosoap–Crack
- 1986: Robland–La Claire Fontaine

Major wins
- Grand Tours Tour de France Points classification (1976, 1978, 1981) 15 individual stages (1976, 1978, 1981) Giro d'Italia 7 individual stages (1977) Vuelta a España General classification (1977) Points classification (1977) 13 individual stages (1977) Stage races Four Days of Dunkirk (1973, 1975, 1976, 1978) Paris–Nice (1977) Volta a Catalunya (1977) One-day races and Classics World Road Race Championships (1976, 1981) National Road Race Championships (1976) Gent–Wevelgem (1975, 1976) Amstel Gold Race (1976) Scheldeprijs (1973) Paris–Tours (1975) Omloop Het Volk (1977, 1978) E3 Prijs Vlaanderen (1978) Other Super Prestige Pernod International (1975–1976) Ruban Jaune (1975–1997)
Medal record
Representing Belgium
Men's road bicycle racing
World Championships
Gold medal – first place	1976 Ostuni	Elite Men's Road Race
Gold medal – first place	1981 Prague	Elite Men's Road Race
Silver medal – second place	1971 Mendrisio	Amateur's Road Race
Silver medal – second place	1973 Barcelona	Elite Men's Road Race

Freddy Maertens (born 13 February 1952) is a Belgian former professional racing cyclist who was twice world road race champion. Maertens' career swung between winning more than 50 races in a season to winning almost none and then back again. His life has been marked by debt and alcoholism. It took him more than two decades to pay a tax debt. At one point early in his career, between the 1976 Tour and 1977 Giro, Maertens won 28 out of 60 Grand Tour stages that he entered before abandoning the Giro due to injury on stage 8b. He achieved eight Tour stage wins, thirteen Vuelta stage wins and seven Giro stage wins in less than one calendar year.

== Personal life ==
Maertens was the son of what his wife, Carine, described as a hard-working middle-class couple: Gilbert Maertens and Silonne Verhaege. His mother was the daughter of a shipbuilder in Nieuwpoort harbour. She had a grocery and newspaper shop, which delivered newspapers. Gilbert Maertens, the son of a self-employed bill-sticker, was a flamboyant and restless man who was a member of the local council and on the committee of the town football club. He ran a laundry with a staff of four behind his wife's shop.

Maertens is one of four brothers: he, Mario, Luc and Marc. Marc also rode as a professional. Maertens went to the St-Bernadus college in Nieuwpoort. He read enthusiastically and showed a talent for languages. He could make himself understood in French, Italian and English as well as his native Dutch by the time he turned professional. He then went to the Onze Lieve Vrouw [Our Lady] college in Ostend.

Maertens and Carine Brouckaert met at a cycling club dance when she was 15. She had been sewing shoes for her father, a cobbler, since the previous year. The two were introduced by Jean-Pierre Monseré and his wife, Annie. Carine was Annie's niece. She had never heard of Maertens.

They married in November 1973 and rented a house in Lombardsijde. She said: "I got to know a young boy who was more adult than his years and who knew what he wanted: to be a professional bike rider. I fell for him. Not because I thought he could become a great rider but because I felt straight away that I could play a role in his life, that he needed me. Three years later we were married. Our dream had started. We didn’t know then that it would turn into a nightmare".

On 25 May 1979 he flew to the United States to see a doctor, to confirm that he had no drug problems. He and a medical advisers flew from Amsterdam to New York City in a McDonnell Douglas DC-10. Maertens mentioned to his colleague, Paul de Nijs, that one of the engines made an odd noise. After Maertens disembarked in New York the plane continued towards Chicago but crashed on take-off when an engine fell off, killing 279.

== Amateur career ==
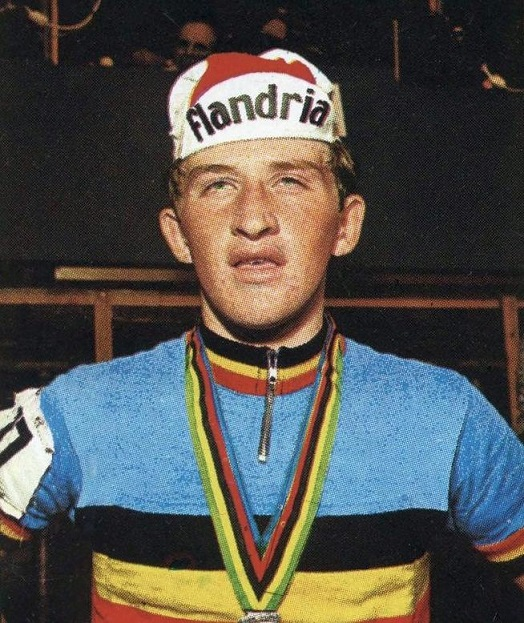
Freddy Maertens became Belgium amateur road champion in 1971

Maertens rode his first race at Westhoek when he was 14, in 1966. The field included riders of 17 and 18, including some from France. The race was open to riders who did not have a licence from the Belgian federation, the BWB. He had trouble riding in a group. His second race went better. Among the riders he beat was Michel Pollentier, later a friend and a team colleague as a professional.

Maertens continued to ride unlicensed races in 1967. In 1968 he took his first licence from the BWB, riding in the nieuweling or beginners' class. He won 21 times and came second 19 times to a rider named Vandromme.

Maertens asked his father permission to leave school in his second year as a junior, or under-19, rider. He won 64 times as a junior. His father made him promise that he would train regardless of the weather.

=== Relationship with father ===
Gilbert Maertens gave his son his first bike, which Freddy Maertens described as "a second-hand thing that he’d got from a beach business for a bargain". Not until he won a race on that would he get a better one. His biographer Rik Vanwalleghem said: "The training school that Maertens went through with his father was hard. Horribly hard. Gilbert never lost sight of anything. He knew how much and how often his son trained, what he ate and drank, how much he slept, who he went around with. He imposed a merciless regime. And he had an eye open for the slightest thing that would obstruct his son's progress. He worried, for instance, that Freddy's male hormones would get the better of his son and drive him into the arms of bewitching young girl who’d put the slides under his mission. Women were the devil's work; it had been like that in the Garden of Eden and little had changed since".

Gilbert caught his son flirting with a girl and took revenge by cutting his racing bike in half. He intervened with the army, when his son was called for national service, to ask that he not be given an easier time because of his reputation.

Maertens' relationship with his father affected the rest of his life. He rode well only when he had a dominant figure behind him: first his father, then Briek Schotte and then Lomme Driessens. His wife described him as trusting and vulnerable, that he needed care because otherwise he would be "like a bird waiting for a cat".

== Professional career ==
Maertens won 50 times as a senior, including the national championship at Nandrin. In 1970 he came second to the Frenchman, Régis Ovion, in the world amateur championship. He competed in the individual road race at the 1972 Summer Olympics. He turned professional in 1972. The frame-maker Ernest Colnago and the former champion Ercole Baldini came to his house with an offer to join their SCIC team. They offered to support him in his last year as an amateur and then take him as a professional.

Gilbert Maertens was more impressed by the Belgian businessman, Paul Claeys, who had inherited the Flandria bicycle company. Flandria already sponsored Maertens' club, SWC Torhout, and Maertens rode a Flandria bike. Claeys came to the Maertens house with his team manager, Briek Schotte, a legend in Belgian cycling. Claeys offered Gilbert Maertens a concession for Flandria bikes, allowing him to sell them without first buying them. Maertens pushed his son to sign a contract for 40,000 francs a month as an amateur and then double in his first full year as a professional. The family needed the bike concession because Silonne Maertens had fallen ill and closed her shop.

Maertens said: "I would have preferred to go to SCIC and Colnago but my father said, 'You have to do something for us too.'"

Colnago and Baldini had promised more money and a gentle start as a professional. But with Flandria Maertens rode more than 200 road races a year and on the track and in cyclo-cross in the winter. He suffered what he called the poor organisation and penny-pinching attitude of Claeys and his Flandria company. He also complained about the weight of Flandria frames; rather than ride them, he had his frames made in Italy, by Gios Torino, and had them painted in Flandria colours.

He was never paid in 1979, his last season with Flandria, which had failed. It was the start of financial troubles with tax officials (see below).

Rik Vanwalleghem says Maertens was naïve as a new professional. Belgian racing was dominated by Eddy Merckx and Roger De Vlaeminck. Maertens did not observe an unwritten rule that new professionals establish themselves gradually and not try to humiliate established riders. Instead, Maertens, just 21, charged in and upset everyone by demanding they make room for him and make room quickly". What Vanwalleghem saw as his blunder was greeted, he said, by Belgian journalists eager to write of something else after years of Merckx's international domination. That worsened relations between them.

=== 1973 world championship ===
Relations between the riders and their fans reached their nadir on 2 September 1973 in the world road championship around the Montjuich climb near Barcelona. Maertens had said he was not willing to ride for Merckx. That angered Merckx's supporters who, Maertens said, six times threw cold water over his legs.

Merckx broke clear on a hill. Maertens said none of the others took up the chase and so he chased by himself. Merckx was angry that Maertens, in his view, had sabotaged his chances of winning. Maertens was the better sprinter.

The two were unable to cooperate and were caught by Luis Ocaña and Felice Gimondi. Maertens agreed to lead Merckx in the sprint and allow him to win. He would be well paid, he understood – "a fantastic offer." But Maertens rode too fast for Merckx to stay with him. Gimondi rode in Maertens' shelter instead. Maertens realised too late and Gimondi won.

Enmity between Merckx and Maertens lasted decades. It ended in 2007 when the two met in a hotel in France.

"I was smoking a cigarette and he asked me for a cigarette. He said to me, 'Freddy, we have to talk about Barcelona.' I said, 'I think so too.' And then we spoke about it for three hours and we shook hands and everything was over".

=== Lomme Driessens ===
Guillaume "Lomme" Driessens was one of three father figures in Maertens' life (see above). He started as a masseur and soigneur for Fausto Coppi. Riders in his care won the Tour seven times. He was a team director from 1947 to 1984. He died in 2006.

Maertens said: "There was my father, then in the beginning as a professional I had Schotte, then I had Driessens..." Driessens provoked the rivalry between Maertens and Merckx by insisting that far from Maertens' having betrayed Merckx by chasing him, Merckx had ensured that Maertens did not win. He had, he said, hidden his exhaustion and therefore his ability to win so as to mislead Maertens into losing. The historian Olivier Dazat said Merckx had dropped Driessens as manager of his teams and that Driessens had never forgiven him. Driessens had directed his Romeo-Smith team to ride all year against Rik Van Looy in similar circumstances and now he wanted his revenge against Merckx.

Maertens said: "I enjoyed working with Driessens. There were no problems. When you work with Driessens there are no problems. A lot of people complained about Driessens, saying he took the racers' money, that he did this, he did that. But in the morning, he was the first to wake you, he prepared your food. He was a fabulous organiser".

He was a dominant figure whose wish to control extended to standing over Carine Maertens to tell her she was not cooking minestrone correctly. Freddy Maertens said Driessens' visits and interventions meant they were no longer bosses in their own house.

=== Equipment war ===
The world championship at Barcelona was complicated by commercial interests. Professional cycling had been dominated by an Italian component maker, Campagnolo. A Japanese rival, Shimano, had recently entered the market. It supplied the Flandria team and designed a range of components specifically for it. Of the Belgian team, Maertens and Walter Godefroot used Shimano; Merckx and the others used Campagnolo.

The Belgian world championship team was training on the championship circuit two days before the race, along with some of the Italian team. Maertens said what he called the "big boss" [grand patron], since dead, at Campagnolo [named in his biography as Tullio Campagnolo] drove beside the group and shouted "Sort it out between you but Shimano mustn't be allowed to win the championship".

Maertens said Gimondi won because he pushed him into the barriers at the finish. When he demanded Belgian officials protest, he said, they answered: "We can't do that to our Italian friends".

=== 1974 world championship ===
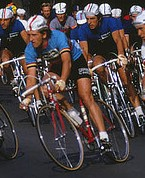
Maertens in the 1974 world championship

Maertens alleges that a laxative was put in his drink during the world championship in Montreal in 1974. He was handed it while he was in the lead with Bernard Thévenet and Constantino Conti. He said his masseur, Jef D’Hont, had told Gust Naessens – Merckx's soigneur – that he was going to eat and asked him to hand a bottle to his rider. Maertens took the bottle because he trusted Naessens, with whom he worked from 1981 to 1983. Maertens said: "I got confirmation of that from Gust Naessens. I asked him, 'What did you do in Montreal?'" He said Naessens replied: "It was normal, Freddy. I was asked to give you your drink and I put something in it. You were too good for my guy, so I put something in it to block you". Merckx won.

Naessens, now dead, was also Tom Simpson's soigneur when he died in the Tour de France of 1967. The following year he was banned from working in cycling for two years.

=== 1976 world championship ===
Maertens started favourite for the 1976 world championship, held at Ostuni, in Italy. He came to the race in good form and with the Belgian team lined in his support. His rival, Eddy Merckx, was in decline.

The race was over hilly eight laps, a total of 288 km. The first moves came on the last lap. Yves Hézard attacked, followed by Francesco Moser and Joop Zoetemelk. Maertens made his move seven kilometres later, with Tino Conti. Maertens and Conti regained the leaders in seven kilometres. Moser attacked twice again and Maertens stayed with him. Zoetemelk and Conti lost ground. Moser realised he had no chance in a sprint with Maertens. The Belgian won by two lengths.

=== 1977 Tour of Flanders ===
The Ronde van Vlaanderen museum in Oudenaarde has in its window a lettered brick with the name of each year's winner. The 1977 race is shown as won by Roger De Vlaeminck. But above it is another, that reads: "Moral winner: Freddy Maertens."

Freddy Maertens was disqualified during the race after changing his bike on the Koppenberg hill. But he was not withdrawn from the race and he carried on riding with De Vlaeminck, a rival in another team. Maertens knew he could not win and he rode the last 80 km with De Vlaeminck in his shelter. Maertens says De Vlaeminck promised 300,000 francs, which De Vlaeminck denies. He says they never discussed money. Maertens says De Vlaeminck paid 150,000 francs, which Maertens gave to Michel Pollentier and Marc Demeyer for their help. Maertens expected a further 150,000 for his own services. De Vlaeminck says they never discussed money and the argument has never closed.

=== Successes ===
Freddy Maertens often benefited by the help of his team-mates, Michel Pollentier and Marc Demeyer. They cleared a path through the bunch in the style of an earlier sprinter, Rik Van Looy. Journalists called them the Three Musketeers.

In 1976 he won eight stages of the Tour de France. He won the points classification in 1976 and again in 1978 and 1981.

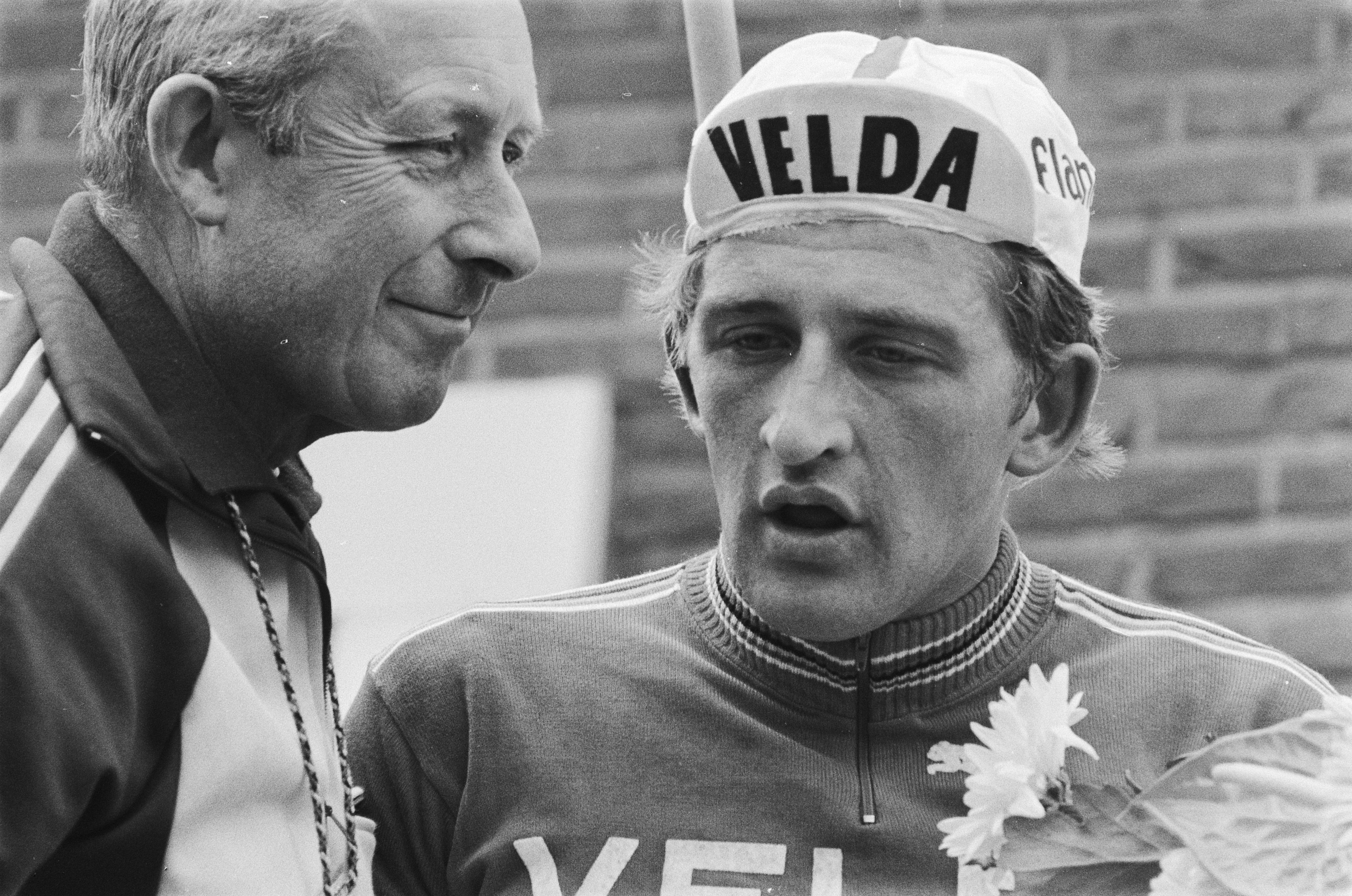
Maertens at the 1978 Tour de France

1977 Vuelta

Maertens won the 1977 Vuelta a España by winning 13 stages, half the total. He imposed his will "like a South American dictator", according to the writer Olivier Dazat. He won the prologue time-trial and led the race from start to finish. 14 of the 20 stages were won by Flandria, with Pollentier taking the other stage win.

1977 Giro

Maertens again took the lead at the start by winning the prologue. He kept it until Francesco Moser became the race leader on stage five. Maertens was expected to take the lead again after Mugello, when there would be a time-trial. He had already won seven stages. The finish at Mugello ended in a crash. Michel Pollentier led Marc Demeyer into the last few hundred metres, with Maertens behind Demeyer. One by one they moved aside to let Maertens through. But he crashed, with Rik Van Linden, and broke a wrist. He abandoned the race and the rest of the team would have returned to Belgium had Maertens not persuaded them otherwise.

Wilderness years

There followed a wilderness period in which he did little of note. He started big races but often stopped after 100 km, or was dropped on unremarkable hills.

It made his performance in the 1981 Tour de France and victory in the 1981 world championship in Prague the more remarkable and was regarded as one of the greatest comebacks in cycling history. In the Tour he won the points classification as well as five stages including the final stage into Paris. In the world championship he finished in front of Giuseppe Saronni and Bernard Hinault, two short and stocky riders like himself. Journalists wondered whether the era of tall, lean riders such as Merckx, Gimondi, and De Vlaeminck was over.

A year later his record faded again. He rarely finished races and shone only in round-the-houses races, where his contract fees were needed to pay his tax debts. He did not defend his title in the 1982 world championship at Goodwood, saying he had injured his knee on a gate. He became fatter and rode for small teams for equally small salaries.

Olivier Dazat said: "His employers sacked him and others stepped in to benefit from the publicity. Freddy often forgot to go to races and was fired again. The press and those around him begged him to stop".

Other successes

As well as the Tour, Vuelta and Giro, his stage race victories included Paris–Nice (1977), the Four Days of Dunkirk (1973, 1975, 1976 and 1978), the Tour of Andalucia (1974, 1975), Tour of Belgium (1974, 1975), Tour de Luxembourg (1975), Tour of Sardinia (1977) and Vuelta y Catalunya (1977).

Despite his sprinting dominance, Maertens never won a one-day classic, coming closest with second places in the Tour of Flanders (1973) and Liège–Bastogne–Liège (1976). He was disqualified from second place in the 1977 Ronde after changing his bike on the Koppenberg climb.

Maertens also won the season-long Super Prestige Pernod International in 1976 and 1977.

== Riding style ==
Maertens was an aggressive rider who pushed high gears. He frequently rode 53 x 13 or 14. He was a talented time-triallist and an excellent sprinter. He nurtured another sprinter Sean Kelly. His time-trial record includes winning the Grand Prix des Nations in 1976.

== Financial problems ==
Maertens and his wife were naïve about money. Carine Maertens said money "flooded in" when her husband reached the top as a professional. Maertens estimated his earnings throughout his career as 10–15 million French francs, "which was a lot of money in the 1970s".

Carine Maertens said: "We let ourselves be sweet-talked by sponsors, team directors, managers, architects, accountants, tax advisers, bankers, investment advisers, doctors. We believed all these people. We believed them because they dressed well and they’d been to school and they could talk well. We had no experience with money, fame, celebrity. We built far too large a villa, we borrowed money until we were raw, we invested in businesses we knew nothing about. We were honest people who trusted others, who never knew there was such nastiness in the world. By the time we realised what was happening, our bank accounts had been plundered. We had a chic villa and not a franc between us".

The Flandria team was riding the Giro d'Italia when it heard rumours of trouble at the Flandria company. He received only half his salary in 1978 and none of the cash to be paid without its being registered in the accounts. In 1979, he was not paid at all. He lost money entrusted to others to invest, including 500 000 francs in the Flandria Ranch, run by his sponsor. He also lost 750 000 francs in a furniture business which burned down. By then he was being challenged by the tax authorities. He won little of significance. He said he was riding for nothing during the day and spending every evening with lawyers. He still disputes the tax that the government demanded. He and his wife lost their house, their car and their furniture.

He owed interest on interest and lost all he had. He calculated his tax bill at 30 million francs [almost US$1 million]. He insisted he owed 1.5 million francs [US$50,000]. He spent long periods without a job and without unemployment benefit and his wife cleaned houses. The problems lasted 30 years. They ended on 10 June 2011. He felt so bitter about Paul Claeys – "not a good guy; he promised and promised and..." – that he refused to attend his funeral in 2012.

== Doping ==
Maertens told L'Équipe that "like everyone else", he had used amphetamines in round-the-houses races but he insisted that he had ridden without drugs in big Tours – not least because he knew he would be tested for them. He was angry when Belgian television used his photograph as a backdrop to discussions about drug-taking in the sport. Rumours intensified when Maertens' successes became erratic.

Maertens was caught in drugs tests. He was first found positive after Professor Michel Debackere perfected a test in 1974 for pemoline, a drug in the amphetamine family that riders believed to be undetectable.

He was disqualified in the Flèche Wallonne of 1977 and found guilty the same year in the Tour de France, the Tour of Belgium and the Tour of Flanders. He also had a positive finding for cortisone in 1986.

Michel Pollentier is quoted as saying: "I told him I could see only one way out for him: to see a psychiatrist, advice he considered stupid. I’ve never hesitated to confess that I spent three weeks under the surveillance of Dr Dejonckheere at the St-Joseph clinic at Ostend and that after treatment I stayed under his control for another two years. Why hide it? It's impossible to come out of a situation like that without the help of a doctor."

== Alcohol ==
Maertens drank champagne during races. And he was for a while salesman for Lanson, a champagne company. Journalists saw crates of champagne at his house and interpreted them as confirmation that he had a drinking problem.

Legend says that on the Friday before the world championship at Goodwood, England, he asked his taxi driver to join him for a pint of beer, "because he sweating so much." Lomme Driessens said: "Too much wine and not enough riding, that's his problem."

Maertens told a reporter, Guy Roger, that the stories were exaggerated. But he acknowledged later that he did have a problem. He attended meetings of Alcoholics Anonymous until word spread that he was there. Now he drinks only non-alcoholic drinks. His body, he said, reacted quickly to alcohol and he could get drunk on a single glass of beer.

== Retirement ==
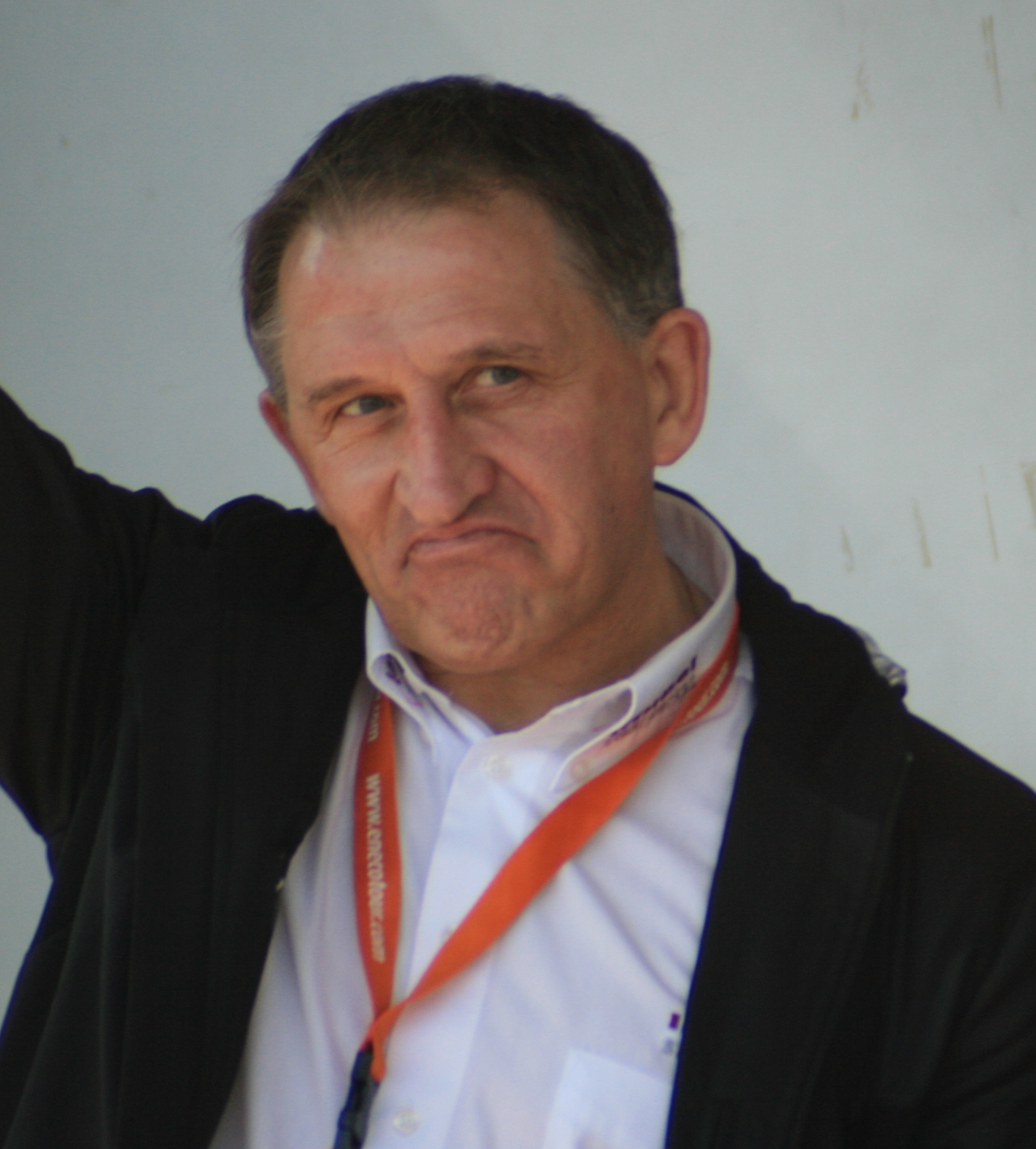
Maertens at the 2008 Eneco Tour

Maertens retired at the age of 35 in 1987 after deciding during a training ride that he no longer wanted to train in the wind and rain of Flanders. He worked as a salesman after retiring, including in Belgium and Luxembourg for Assos, a Swiss clothing company. He left Assos, he said, when supplies became erratic. He kept a distance from the sport. His weight rose to 100 kg. In 2000 he began to work in the Belgian National Cycling Museum ('Nationaal Wielermuseum') in his hometown Roeselare. Many visitors of the museum liked the presence of a real world champion during their visit. In 2008 he moved to the Centrum Ronde van Vlaanderen (Tour of Flanders Center) in Oudenaarde. In 2017, after health problems, he retired. He works when possible as a volunteer or special guest in both museums. The museum in Roeselare is now renamed to 'KOERS. Museum of Cycle Racing'. The bicycle shop "Maertens Sport" in Evergem on the outskirts of Ghent is owned by Freddy's brother Mario.

== Career achievements ==
=== Road ===
==== Amateur ====
1971
1st Road race, National Amateur Road Championships
2nd Road race, UCI Road World Amateur Championships
1972
1st GP Roeselare
1st Omloop Het Volk U23 (nl)
1st Omloop van de Westhoek
2nd Ronde Van Vlaanderen Beloften
4th Circuit des Frontières
5th Flèche Ardennaise

==== Professional ====
1973
1st Overall Four Days of Dunkirk

1st Stage 5b (ITT)

1st Scheldeprijs
1st Bruxelles–Meulebeke
1st Leeuwse Pijl
1st Omloop van de Westkust
1st Tour du Condroz
1st GP Roeselare
2nd Road race, UCI Road World Championships
2nd Tour of Flanders
2nd Kuurne–Brussels–Kuurne
2nd Elfstedenronde
2nd Tour of the Flemish Ardennes
2nd Omloop van de Westkust
3rd Dwars door België
3rd Rund um den Henninger Turm
3rd Omloop van de Grensstreek
3rd Omloop van Oost-Vlaanderen
3rd Liedekerkse Pijl (fr)
4th E3 Prijs Vlaanderen
4th Boucles de l'Aulne
5th Paris–Roubaix
5th Gent–Wevelgem
8th Road race, National Road Championships
8th Amstel Gold Race
9th Grand Prix de Wallonie
1974
1st Overall Vuelta a Andalucía

1st Prologue a & b, Stages 1, 2, 4, 5 & 6

1st Overall Tour de Luxembourg

1st Stages 1 & 2

1st Tour of Leuven
1st Kampioenschap van Vlaanderen
1st Omloop van Midden-Vlaanderen
1st Nokere Koerse
1st Elfstedenronde
Tour of Belgium

1st Points Classification
1st Stages 2, 3 & 4

1st Bruxelles–Meulebeke
1st Izegem Koers (nl)
2nd E3 Prijs Vlaanderen
2nd Grand Prix de Wallonie
2nd Critérium des As
3rd Overall Four Days of Dunkirk

1st Stage 3b (ITT)

3rd Brabantse Pijl
3rd Omloop van Oost-Vlaanderen
4th Overall Grand Prix du Midi Libre
4th Amstel Gold Race
4th Coppa Ugo Agostoni
4th Rund um den Henninger Turm
5th Paris–Tours
5th Overall GP du Midi Libre
5th Boucles de l'Aulne
5th GP Roeselare
6th Overall Tirreno–Adriatico
6th Gent–Wevelgem
6th La Flèche Wallonne
6th Kuurne–Brussels–Kuurne
6th GP Union Dortmund
7th Paris–Roubaix
8th Omloop Het Volk
9th Milan–San Remo
9th Liège–Bastogne–Liège
9th Gran Piemonte
1975
1st Overall Vuelta a Andalucía

1st Stages 1a, 1b, 5, 6 & 7b

1st Overall Tour of Belgium

1st Points classification
1st Stages 1a (ITT), 1b & 2

1st Overall Four Days of Dunkirk

1st Stage 3b (ITT)

1st Gent–Wevelgem
1st Paris–Tours
1st Paris–Brussels
1st Tour of Leuven
Critérium du Dauphiné Libéré

1st Points classification
1st Prologue, Stages 1, 2a, 2b, 3, 4 & 7b (ITT)

1st Bruxelles–Meulebeke
1st GP Roeselare
2nd Amstel Gold Race
2nd E3 Prijs Vlaanderen
2nd Coppa Ugo Agostoni
2nd Trofeo Baracchi (with Michel Pollentier)
2nd Hyon-Mons
3rd Scheldeprijs
3rd Kuurne–Brussels–Kuurne
3rd Gran Premio di Lugano
3rd Critérium des As
4th La Flèche Wallonne
4th Milano–Torino
4th Kampioenschap van Vlaanderen
4th Rund um den Henninger Turm
5th Giro di Lombardia
5th Overall Paris–Nice

1st Points classification
1st Stage 2

6th Paris–Roubaix
8th Tour of Flanders
9th Milan–San Remo
1976
1st Road race, UCI Road World Championships
1st Road race, National Road Championships
1st Overall Four Days of Dunkirk

1st Stage 2b (ITT)

1st Super Prestige Pernod International
1st Gent–Wevelgem
1st Amstel Gold Race
1st Rund um den Henninger Turm
1st Züri-Metzgete
1st Grand Prix des Nations
1st Brabantse Pijl
1st Kampioenschap van Vlaanderen
1st Trofeo Baracchi (with Michel Pollentier)
1st Critérium des As
1st Stage 1b Escalada a Montjuïc
1st Stage 2 & 3 Tour of Corsica
1st Liedekerkse Pijl (fr)
1st Heusden Koers
2nd Liège–Bastogne–Liège
2nd Grand Prix de Wallonie
2nd Tour de Wallonie
2nd Omloop van de Grensstreek
2nd G.P Betekom
3rd Overall Tour of Belgium

1st Stage 1a (ITT)

3rd La Flèche Wallonne
4th Overall Paris–Nice

1st Points classification
1st Prologue, Stages 2, 3, 4, 6a & 6b

4th Paris–Brussels
4th Tour du Condroz
5th Tour of Flanders
5th GP Roeselare
6th Grand Prix of Aargau Canton
7th Overall Tour de Suisse

1st Points classification
1st Combination classification
1st Prologue & Stage 1

8th Overall Tour de France

1st Points classification
1st Prologue, Stages 1, 3 (ITT), 7, 18a, 18b, 21 & 22a (ITT)
Held after Prologue & Stages 1–8

8th Overall Ronde van Nederland

1st Points classification
1st Stages 5a & 5b (ITT)

1977
1st Overall Vuelta a España

1st Points classification
1st Sprints classification
1st Prologue, Stages 1, 2, 5, 6, 7, 8, 9, 11a (ITT), 11b, 13, 16 & 19

1st Overall Paris–Nice

1st Points classification
1st Prologue, Stages 1a, 1b, 2 & 7b (ITT)

1st Overall Volta a Catalunya

1st Points classification
1st Prologue, Stages 1, 3b, 4b & 7a (ITT)

1st Overall Setmana Catalana de Ciclisme

1st Stages 1b, 4, 5a & 5b (ITT)

1st Overall Giro di Sardegna

1st Stage 1

1st Omloop Het Volk
1st Trofeo Laigueglia
Giro d'Italia

1st Prologue, Stages 1, 4, 6a, 6b, 7 & 8a
Held after Prologue & Stages 1–4
Held after Prologue & Stages 1–8b

1st Stage 1 Tour de Suisse
1st Stage 3 Ronde van Nederland
1st Delta Profronde
1st G.P Malderen
1st Super Prestige Pernod International
2nd Tour of Flanders
2nd Trofeo Baracchi (with Joop Zoetemelk)
2nd Giro del Mendrisiotto
3rd Paris–Roubaix
5th Milan–San Remo
5th Liège–Bastogne–Liège
5th Amstel Gold Race
8th Overall Escalada a Montjuïc
8th Paris–Brussels
8th Grand Prix de Wallonie
9th Overall Tour of Belgium
1978
1st Overall Four Days of Dunkirk

1st Stages 2a & 2b

1st Omloop Het Volk
1st E3 Prijs Vlaanderen
1st Tour du Haut Var
1st Châteauroux Classic
Tour de France

1st Points classification
1st Stages 5 & 7

1st Stage 7a Critérium du Dauphiné Libéré
1st Stage 5 Tour de Suisse
1st Heusden Koers
2nd Overall Tour of Belgium

1st Points Classification

2nd Overall Vuelta a Mallorca

1st Stage 2b

2nd De Kustpijl
2nd Bruxelles–Meulebeke
4th Paris–Roubaix
4th Amstel Gold Race
5th Grand Prix of Aargau Canton
6th Trofeo Laigueglia
8th Tour of Flanders
9th Liège–Bastogne–Liège
9th Gent–Wevelgem

1979

9th Primus Classic
1980
1st Stage 1 Cronostafetta
3rd Omloop van West-Brabant
6th Tour of Flanders
6th Giro di Campania
6th Trofeo Pantalica
1981
1st Road race, UCI Road World Championships
Tour de France

1st Points classification
1st Intermediate sprints classification
1st Stages 1a, 3, 12a, 13, & 22

Vuelta a Andalucía

1st Points Classification
1st Stage 4

3rd Omloop van West-Brabant
7th Milan–San Remo
10th Dwars door West-Vlaanderen
1982
1st Hyon-Mons
9th Overall Three Days of De Panne
1983
1st G.P du Printemps à Hannut (fr)
7th Grand Prix Pino Cerami

=== Track ===
1975
2nd Six Days of Grenoble, Madison
3rd National Track Championships (fr), Madison (with Walter Godefroot)
1976
1st Six Days of Dortmund (with Patrick Sercu)
2nd Six Days of Antwerp (with Dieter Kemper)
3rd National Track Championships (fr), Madison (with Marc Demeyer)
1977
1st National Derny Championships
1st Six Days of Antwerp (with Patrick Sercu)
2nd Six Days of Ghent (with Danny Clark)
2nd Six Days of Milan (with Marc Demeyer)
2nd National Track Championships (fr), Omnium
3rd European Championships, Omnium (with Patrick Sercu and Danny Clark)
1978
1st Six Days of Antwerp (with Danny Clark)
3rd European Championships, Omnium (with Roman Hermann and Danny Clark)

=== Grand Tour general classification results timeline ===
Grand Tour	1976	1977	1978	1979	1980	1981
/ Vuelta a España	—	1	—	—	—	—
Giro d'Italia	—	DNF	—	—	—	—
Tour de France	8	—	13	—	—	66

=== Classics & Monuments results timeline ===
Monument	1972	1973	1974	1975	1976	1977	1978	1979	1980	1981	1982	1983
Milan–San Remo	—	17	9	9	—	5	26	—	12	7	—	—
Tour of Flanders	—	2	12	8	5	DSQ	8	—	6	—	—	—
Paris–Roubaix	—	5	7	6	—	3	4	—	—	—	—	—
Liège–Bastogne–Liège	—	—	9	—	2	5	9	—	—	—	—	—
Giro di Lombardia	—	—	—	5	—	12	—	—	—	—	—	—
Classic	1972	1973	1974	1975	1976	1977	1978	1979	1980	1981	1982	1983
Omloop Het Volk	—	—	8	14	13	1	1	—	—	—	—	—
E3 Prijs Vlaanderen	—	4	2	2	—	—	1	—	—	—	20	—
Gent–Wevelgem	—	5	6	1	1	—	9	—	—	—	—	—
Amstel Gold Race	—	8	4	2	1	5	4	—	—	—	—	40
Paris–Tours	26	—	5	1	23	23	—	—	—	—	—	—

=== Major championship results timeline ===
	1972	1973	1974	1975	1976	1977	1978	1979	1980	1981	1982	1983
World Championships	—	2	DNF	21	1	DNF	DNF	—	—	1	DNF	—
National Championships	—	8	15	18	1	—	—	—	—	—	—	—

Legend
—	Did not compete
DNF	Did not finish
DNS	Did not start
DSQ	Disqualified

=== Records ===
- Most stage wins in 1 Tour de France: 8 in 1976 (record shared with Charles Pélissier and Eddy Merckx)
- Most stage wins in 1 Vuelta a España: 13 in 1977
- Most Grand Tour stage wins in 1 season: 20 in 1977 (13 stages in the Vuelta a España and 7 in the Giro d'Italia)
- Most wins in Four Days of Dunkirk: 4 in 1973, 1975, 1976, 1978
- Most wins in Bruxelles–Meulebeke: 3 in 1973, 1974, 1975

== Awards and honours ==
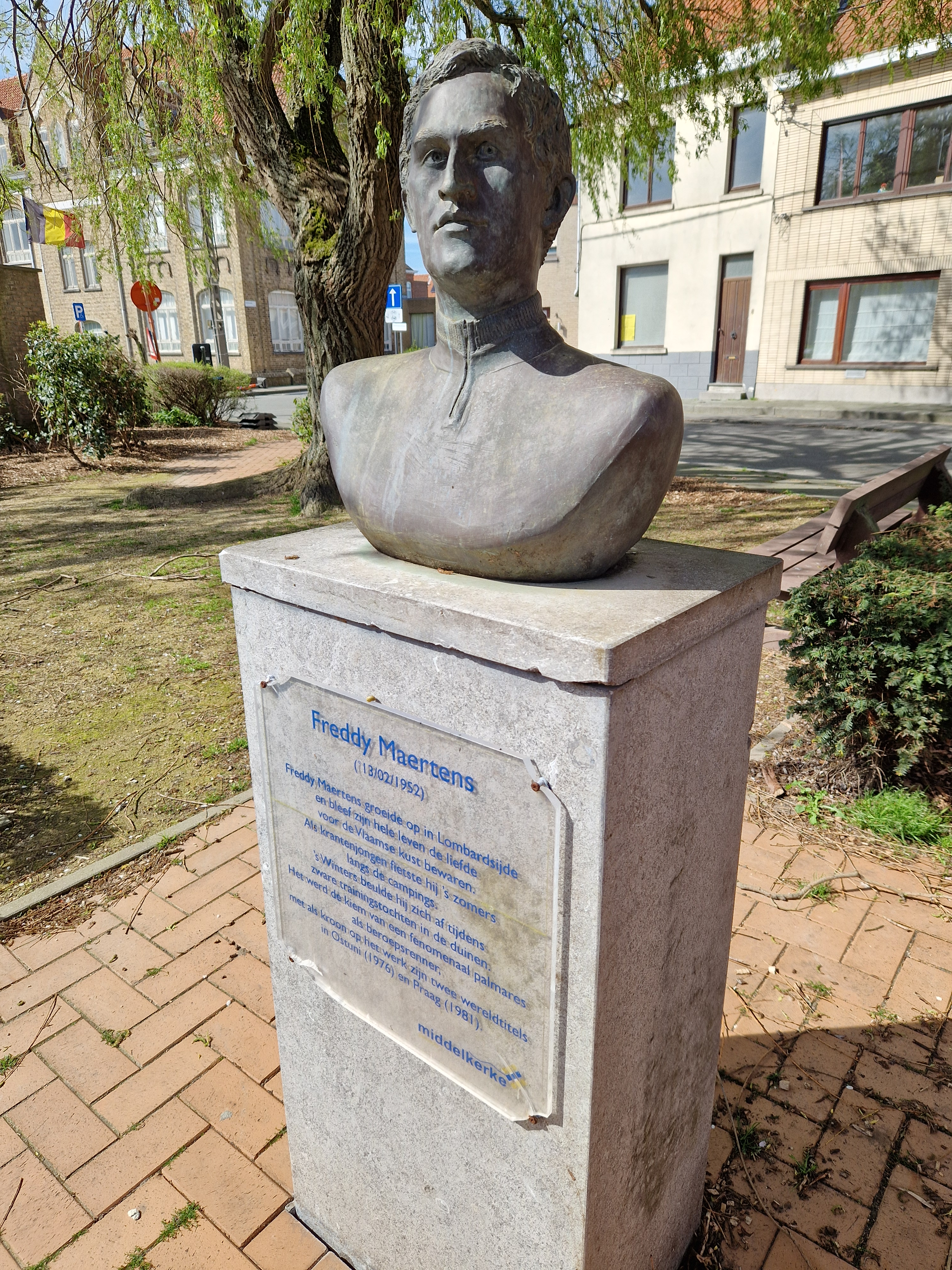

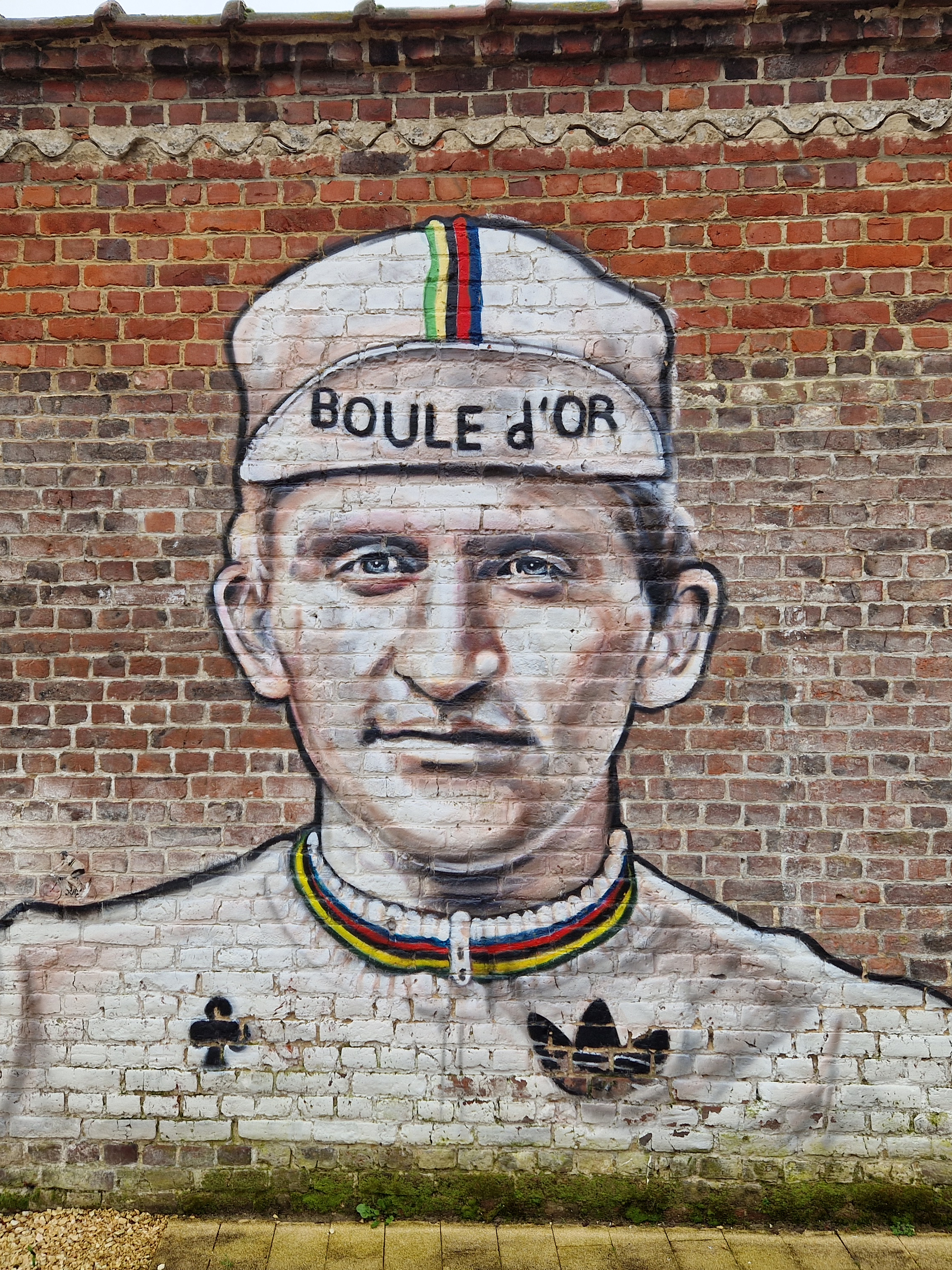
Mural Freddy Maertens

Bust of Maertens in Lombardsijde and mural in Roeselare
- Ruban Jaune: From 1975 to 1997 (record)
- Gan Challenge: 1976, 1977
- Swiss Mendrisio d'Or: 1976
- Belgian Sportsman of the Year: 1981, Runner-up: 1976
- Introduced in the UCI Hall of Fame: 2002
- Memoire du Cyclisme – 20th Greatest Cyclist of all Time: 2002
- Honorary Citizen of Middelkerke: 2004
- Bust in Lombardsijde: 2005
- CyclingNews 5th Best Sprinter of All Time: 2023
- UCI Top 100 of All Time: 3,955 points
- Procyclingstats.com – All Time Wins Ranking: 10th place (147 wins)

== See also ==
- List of doping cases in cycling
