= 1973 Omloop Het Volk =

Race details
- Dates: 3 March 1973
- Stages: 1
- Distance: 198 km (123 mi)
- Winning time: 4h 37' 00"

Results
	Winner	Eddy Merckx (BEL)
	Second	Roger De Vlaeminck (BEL)
	Third	Albert Van Vlierberghe (BEL)

The 1973 Omloop Het Volk was the 28th edition of the Omloop Het Volk cycle race and was held on 3 March 1973. The race started and finished in Ghent. The race was won by Eddy Merckx.

== General classification ==
Final general classification
Rank	Rider	Time
1	Eddy Merckx (BEL)	4h 37' 00"
2	Roger De Vlaeminck (BEL)	+ 2"
3	Albert Van Vlierberghe (BEL)	+ 1' 03"
4	Noël Vantyghem (BEL)	+ 1' 03"
5	Walter Godefroot (BEL)	+ 1' 25"
6	Herman Van Springel (BEL)	+ 1' 25"
7	Eric Leman (BEL)	+ 1' 25"
8	Walter Planckaert (BEL)	+ 1' 25"
9	Frans Verbeeck (BEL)	+ 1' 25"
10	Cees Bal (NED)	+ 1' 25"
