= 1974 Omloop Het Volk =

Race details
- Dates: 2 March 1974
- Stages: 1
- Distance: 193 km (120 mi)
- Winning time: 4h 35' 00"

Results
	Winner	Joseph Bruyère (BEL)
	Second	Patrick Sercu (BEL)
	Third	Rik Van Linden (BEL)

The 1974 Omloop Het Volk was the 29th edition of the Omloop Het Volk cycle race and was held on 2 March 1974. The race started and finished in Ghent. The race was won by Joseph Bruyère.

== General classification ==
Final general classification
Rank	Rider	Time
1	Joseph Bruyère (BEL)	4h 35' 00"
2	Patrick Sercu (BEL)	+ 1' 22"
3	Rik Van Linden (BEL)	+ 1' 22"
4	Frans Verbeeck (BEL)	+ 1' 22"
5	Walter Planckaert (BEL)	+ 1' 22"
6	Eddy Merckx (BEL)	+ 1' 22"
7	Jos Huysmans (BEL)	+ 1' 22"
8	Freddy Maertens (BEL)	+ 1' 22"
9	Walter Planckaert (BEL)	+ 1' 22"
10	Roger Rosiers (BEL)	+ 1' 22"
