= 1974 Liège–Bastogne–Liège =

Race details
- Dates: 21 April 1974
- Stages: 1
- Distance: 246 km (153 mi)
- Winning time: 6h 23' 00"

Results
	Winner	Georges Pintens (BEL)	(MIC–Ludo–de Gribaldy)
	Second	Walter Planckaert (BEL)	(Watney–Maes Pils)
	Third	–	

The 1974 Liège–Bastogne–Liège was the 60th edition of the Liège–Bastogne–Liège cycle race and was held on 21 April 1974. The race started and finished in Liège. The race was won by Georges Pintens of the MIC–Ludo–de Gribaldy team.

== General classification ==
Final general classification

Rank	Rider	Team	Time
DSQ	~~Ronald De Witte (BEL)~~	~~Carpenter–Confortluxe–Flandria~~	~~6h 23' 00"~~ (Note: Disqualified for doping.)
1	Georges Pintens (BEL)	MIC–Ludo–de Gribaldy	6h 23' 00"
2	Walter Planckaert (BEL)	Watney–Maes Pils	+ 2' 00"
4	Wladimiro Panizza (ITA)	Brooklyn	+ 2' 00"
~~5~~	~~Wilfried David (BEL)~~	~~Carpenter–Confortluxe–Flandria~~	~~+ 2' 00"~~
6	Ronny Vanmarcke (BEL)	MIC–Ludo–de Gribaldy	+ 2' 00"
~~7~~	~~Raymond Delisle (FRA)~~	~~Peugeot–BP–Michelin~~	~~+ 2' 00"~~
8	Ferdinand Bracke (BEL)	Watney–Maes Pils	+ 2' 00"
9	Freddy Maertens (BEL)	Carpenter–Confortluxe–Flandria	+ 5' 53"
10	Frans Verbeeck (BEL)	Watney–Maes Pils	+ 5' 53"
