= 1976 Amstel Gold Race =

Dutch cycling race

The 1976 Amstel Gold Race was the 11th edition of the annual Amstel Gold Race road bicycle race, held on Sunday March 27, 1976, in the Dutch provinces of Limburg. The race stretched 230 kilometres, with the start in Heerlen and the finish in Meerssen. There were a total of 118 competitors, and 42 cyclists finished the race.

== Result ==
Final result (1–10)
Rank	Rider	Time
1	Freddy Maertens (BEL)	5:53:08
2	Jan Raas (NED)	+ 4.29
3	Lucien Leman (BEL)	+ 5.19
4	Patrick Béon (FRA)	+ 0
5	Hennie Kuiper (NED)	+ 0
6	Joop Zoetemelk (NED)	+ 5.32
7	Roger Swerts (BEL)	+ 6.36
8	Roy Schuiten (NED)	+ 6.47
9	Frans Verbeeck (BEL)	+ 0
10	Cees Bal (NED)	+ 0
