= 1973 E3 Prijs Vlaanderen =

1973 E3 Harelbeke
Race details
- Dates: 24 March 1973
- Stages: 1
- Distance: 226 km (140 mi)
- Winning time: 5h 39' 00"

Results
	Winner	Willy In 't Ven (BEL)
	Second	Albert Van Vlierberghe (BEL)
	Third	Walter Planckaert (BEL)

The 1973 E3 Harelbeke was the 16th edition of the E3 Harelbeke cycle race and was held on 24 March 1973. The race started and finished in Harelbeke. The race was won by Willy In 't Ven.

== General classification ==
Final general classification

Rank	Rider	Time
1	Willy In 't Ven (BEL)	5h 39' 00"
2	Albert Van Vlierberghe (BEL)	+ 22"
3	Walter Planckaert (BEL)	+ 22"
4	Freddy Maertens (BEL)	+ 22"
5	Georges Pintens (BEL)	+ 22"
6	Patrick Sercu (BEL)	+ 56"
7	Dirk Baert (BEL)	+ 56"
8	Ronald De Witte (BEL)	+ 56"
9	Daniel Van Ryckeghem (BEL)	+ 1' 21"
10	Rik Van Linden (BEL)	+ 1' 21"
