= 1974 Grote Prijs Jef Scherens =

Race details
- Dates: 15 September 1974
- Stages: 1
- Distance: 198 km (123.0 mi)
- Winning time: 5h 02' 00"

Results
	Winner	Freddy Maertens (BEL)
	Second	Rik Van Linden (BEL)
	Third	Frans Verbeeck (BEL)

The 1974 Grote Prijs Jef Scherens was the tenth edition of the Grote Prijs Jef Scherens cycle race and was held on 15 September 1974. The race started and finished in Leuven. The race was won by Freddy Maertens.

== General classification ==
Final general classification

Rank	Rider	Time
1	Freddy Maertens (BEL)	5h 02' 00"
2	Rik Van Linden (BEL)	+ 0"
3	Frans Verbeeck (BEL)	+ 0"
4	Walter Planckaert (BEL)	+ 0"
5	Roger Loysch (BEL)	+ 0"
6	Jean-Pierre Berckmans (BEL)	+ 0"
7	Ludo Van Der Linden (BEL)	+ 0"
8	Victor Van Schil (BEL)	+ 0"
9	Marc Demeyer (BEL)	+ 0"
10	Rafael Constant (BEL)	+ 0"
