= 1978 E3 Prijs Vlaanderen =

1978 E3 Harelbeke
Race details
- Dates: 1 April 1978
- Stages: 1
- Distance: 230 km (140 mi)
- Winning time: 5h 40' 00"

Results
| | Winner | Freddy Maertens (BEL) |
| | Second | Jan Raas (NED) |
| | Third | Ronald De Witte (BEL) |

The 1978 E3 Harelbeke was the 21st edition of the E3 Harelbeke cycle race and was held on 1 April 1978. The race started and finished in Harelbeke. The race was won by Freddy Maertens.

== General classification ==
Final general classification

| Rank | Rider | Time |
|---|---|---|
| 1 | Freddy Maertens (BEL) | 5h 40' 00" |
| 2 | Jan Raas (NED) | + 8" |
| 3 | Ronald De Witte (BEL) | + 44" |
| 4 | Etienne Van Der Helst (BEL) | + 44" |
| 5 | Walter Planckaert (BEL) | + 2' 30" |
| 6 | Marc Demeyer (BEL) | + 2' 30" |
| 7 | Johnny Vanderveken (BEL) | + 2' 30" |
| 8 | Piet Van Katwijk (NED) | + 2' 30" |
| 9 | Walter Godefroot (BEL) | + 2' 30" |
| 10 | Ronny Van De Vijver (BEL) | + 2' 30" |
