= 1976 Gent–Wevelgem =

Race details
- Dates: 6 April 1976
- Stages: 1
- Distance: 262 km (163 mi)
- Winning time: 6h 15' 15"

Results
	Winner	Freddy Maertens (BEL)	(Flandria–Velda–West Vlaams Vleesbedrijf)
	Second	Rik Van Linden (BEL)	(Bianchi–Campagnolo)
	Third	Frans Verbeeck (BEL)	(IJsboerke–Colnago)

The 1976 Gent–Wevelgem was the 38th edition of the Belgian Gent–Wevelgem cycle race and was held on 6 April 1976. The race started in Ghent and finished in Wevelgem. The race was won by Freddy Maertens of the Flandria team.

== General classification ==
Final general classification

Rank	Rider	Team	Time
1	Freddy Maertens (BEL)	Flandria–Velda–West Vlaams Vleesbedrijf	6h 15' 15"
2	Rik Van Linden (BEL)	Bianchi–Campagnolo	+ 0"
3	Frans Verbeeck (BEL)	IJsboerke–Colnago	+ 0"
4	Piet van Katwijk (NED)	TI–Raleigh–Campagnolo	+ 0"
5	Walter Planckaert (BEL)	Maes Pils–Rokado	+ 0"
6	Roger De Vlaeminck (BEL)	Brooklyn	+ 0"
7	Francesco Moser (ITA)	Sanson	+ 0"
8	Dietrich Thurau (FRG)	TI–Raleigh–Campagnolo	+ 0"
9	André Dierickx (BEL)	Maes Pils–Rokado	+ 0"
10	Eddy Merckx (BEL)	Molteni–Campagnolo	+ 0"
