= 1975 E3 Prijs Vlaanderen =

1975 E3 Harelbeke
Race details
- Dates: 22 March 1975
- Stages: 1
- Distance: 226 km (140 mi)
- Winning time: 5h 55' 00"

Results
	Winner	Frans Verbeeck (BEL)	(Maes Pils–Watney)
	Second	Freddy Maertens (BEL)	(Carpenter–Confortluxe–Flandria)
	Third	Cees Bal (NED)	(Gan–Mercier–Hutchinson)

The 1975 E3 Harelbeke was the 18th edition of the E3 Harelbeke cycle race and was held on 22 March 1975. The race started and finished in Harelbeke. The race was won by Frans Verbeeck of the Maes Pils team.

== General classification ==
Final general classification

Rank	Rider	Team	Time
1	Frans Verbeeck (BEL)	Maes Pils–Watney	5h 55' 00"
2	Freddy Maertens (BEL)	Carpenter–Confortluxe–Flandria	+ 0"
3	Cees Bal (NED)	Gan–Mercier–Hutchinson	+ 0"
4	Ronald De Witte (BEL)	Carpenter–Confortluxe–Flandria	+ 5' 14"
5	Gerben Karstens (NED)	Gitane–Campagnolo	+ 6' 27"
6	Jan Raas (NED)	TI–Raleigh	+ 6' 27"
7	Luc D'Hondt (BEL)	Maes Pils–Watney	+ 6' 27"
8	Guido Van Sweevelt (BEL)	Maes Pils–Watney	+ 6' 27"
9	Marc Demeyer (BEL)	Carpenter–Confortluxe–Flandria	+ 6' 27"
10	Herman Van der Slagmolen (BEL)	Brooklyn	+ 6' 27"
