= 1975 Tour of Flanders =

Race details
- Dates: 6 April 1975
- Stages: 1
- Distance: 255 km (158.4 mi)
- Winning time: 6h 16'

Results
	Winner	Eddy Merckx (BEL)	(Molteni)
	Second	Frans Verbeeck (BEL)	(Maes–Watneys)
	Third	Marc Demeyer (BEL)	(Flandria–Carpenter)

The 59th running of the Tour of Flanders cycling race in Belgium was held on Sunday 6 April 1975. Belgian Eddy Merckx won the classic a second time. The race started in Ghent and finished in Meerbeke (Ninove).

== Course ==
World champion Eddy Merckx concluded his second win after another memorable raid to the finish. Merckx broke clear from the peloton on the Oude Kwaremont together with fellow Belgian Frans Verbeeck with 104 km to ride. Merckx and Verbeeck continued working for the remainder of the course, until Merckx distanced his worn-out companion in Denderwindeke, 6 km before the finish in Meerbeke. The best of the other riders came in at more than five minutes.

== Climbs ==
There were eight categorized climbs:

- Oude Kwaremont
- Nieuwe Kruisberg
- Taaienberg
- Eikenberg
- Volkegemberg
- Varent
- Muur
- Bosberg

== Results ==
	Cyclist	Team	Time
1	Eddy Merckx (BEL)	Molteni	6h 16' 00"
2	Frans Verbeeck (BEL)	Maes–Watneys	+ 13"
3	Marc Demeyer (BEL)	Flandria–Carpenter	+ 5'02"
4	Walter Planckaert (BEL)	Maes–Watneys	+ 5'08"
5	Rik Van Linden (BEL)	Bianchi–Campagnolo	s.t.
6	Gerben Karstens (NED)	Gitane	s.t.
7	Staf Van Roosbroeck (BEL)	Alsaver-Jeunet	s.t.
8	Freddy Maertens (BEL)	Flandria–Carpenter	s.t.
9	Roger Rosiers (BEL)	Super Ser	s.t.
10	Willem Peeters (BEL)	Maes–Watneys	s.t.
