= Gerben Karstens =

Dutch cyclist (1942–2022)

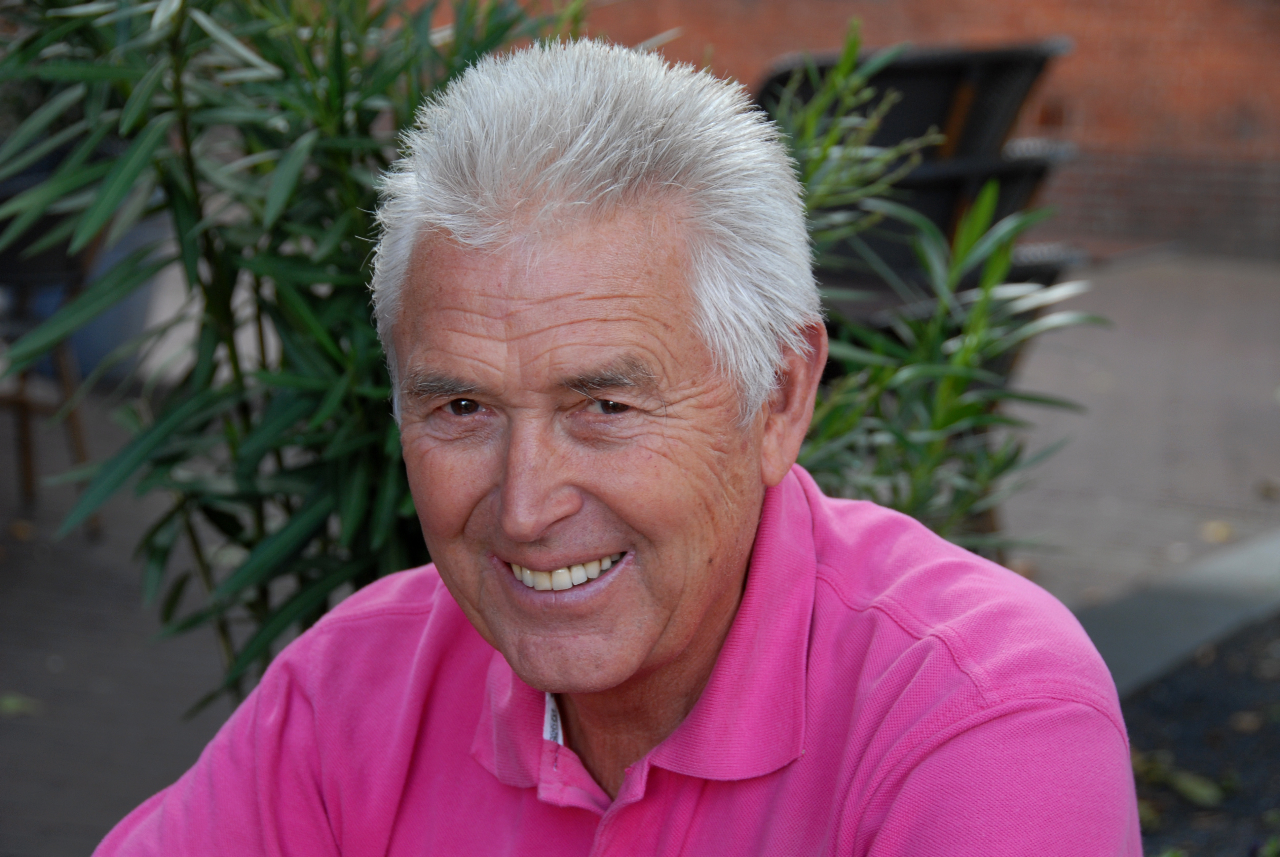

Personal information
- Full name: Gerben Karstens
- Born: 14 January 1942 Voorburg, German-occupied Netherlands
- Died: 8 October 2022 (aged 80) Dongen, Netherlands

Cycling career
- Sport: Cycling
- Discipline: Road
- Role: Rider
- Rider type: Sprinter

Professional teams
- 1965: Televizier
- 1966–1967: Televizier–Batavus
- 1968–1970: Peugeot–BP–Michelin
- 1971: Goudsmit–Hoff
- 1972–1973: Rokado
- 1974: Bic
- 1975: Gitane–Campagnolo
- 1976–1978: TI–Raleigh
- 1979–1980: De Vleeschmeesters

Major wins
- Grand Tours Tour de France 6 individual stages (1965, 1966, 1971, 1976) 2 TTT stages (1966, 1976) Giro d'Italia 1 individual stage (1974) Vuelta a España 14 individual stages (1966, 1967, 1971, 1973, 1974, 1976) One-day races and Classics National Road Race Championships (1966) Paris–Tours (1965)
Medal record
Representing the Netherlands
Men's road bicycle racing
Olympic Games
Gold medal – first place	1964 Tokyo	Team time trial

Gerben Karstens (14 January 1942 – 8 October 2022) was a Dutch professional racing cyclist, who won the gold medal in the 100 km team trial at the 1964 Summer Olympics, alongside Bart Zoet, Evert Dolman, and Jan Pieterse. At the same Olympics he finished 27th in the individual road race. Karstens ranks 6th in all-time stage wins in Vuelta a España history.

== Biography ==
After the Olympic Games, Karstens started a successful professional career, where he won six stages in the Tour de France, 14 stages in the Vuelta a España, 1 stage in the Giro d'Italia, and other races such as Paris–Tours and GP Fourmies. He became Dutch national road race champion in 1966.

In the 1974 Tour de France, Karstens finished second in the fourth stage. Afterwards, he forgot to take the doping tests. The tour organisation set him back to the last place of the stage results, and gave him 10 minutes penalty time in the overall classification, which made him lose his third place. One day later, the jury took the penalty time back. Thanks to 5 seconds of bonification that Karstens won during intermediate sprints, he took over the yellow jersey from Eddy Merckx. He wore yellow for one stage before losing it to Patrick Sercu after stage 6A, but he reclaimed the overall lead after stage 6B to spend another stage in Yellow before Merckx took over the lead for the remainder of the Tour.

Karstens died of complications from a stroke on 8 October 2022, at the age of 80.

== Major results ==
1962
1st Ronde van Limburg
1964
1st Team time trial, Olympic Games
1st Ronde van Noord-Holland
1st Ronde van Overijssel
10th Overall Tour de l'Avenir

1st Stage 13

1965
1st Paris–Tours
1st Stage 21 Tour de France
1st Stage 1 Ronde van Nederland
2nd Giro di Lombardia
7th Trofeo Baracchi (with Henk Nijdam)
8th Nationale Sluitingsprijs
1966
1st Road race, National Road Championships
1st Critérium des As
Tour de France

1st Stages 3a (TTT), 3b & 9

Vuelta a España

1st Stages 12, 15b & 17

1st Stage 6 Critérium du Dauphiné Libéré
1st Stage 2 Paris–Luxembourg
3rd Omloop der Vlaamse Gewesten
3rd Heist-op-den-Berg
3rd Trofeo Baracchi (with Bart Zoet)
5th Rund um den Henninger Turm
5th Gran Premio di Lugano
9th Grand Prix des Nations
10th Paris–Roubaix
10th Bruxelles–Meulebeke
1967
Vuelta a España

1st Stages 7, 10, 17 (ITT) & 18

1st Stage 4 Tour de Suisse
3rd Hoeilaart-Diest-Hoeilaart
4th Overall Giro di Sardegna
5th Road race, National Road Championships
7th Harelbeke–Antwerp–Harelbeke
9th Milan–San Remo
10th Tour of Flanders
Tour de France

Held after Stages 4 & 6

1968
1st Grand Prix de Fourmies
6th Harelbeke–Antwerp–Harelbeke
8th Nokere Koerse
1969
3rd Road race, National Road Championships
3rd Coppa Agostoni
4th Trofeo Baracchi (with René Pijnen)
5th Overall Four Days of Dunkirk

1st Stage 6a

6th Züri-Metzgete
9th Road race, UCI Road World Championships
1970
2nd Milan–San Remo
7th Overall Tour of Belgium

1st Stage 4

7th Trofeo Laigueglia
9th Paris–Roubaix
10th Bruxelles–Meulebeke
1971
Tour de France

1st Stage 1b
Held after Stages 1c, 7 & 8

1st Stage 11a Vuelta a España
1st stage 6 Tour de Suisse
2nd Amstel Gold Race
3rd Road race, National Road Championships
3rd Gent–Wevelgem
3rd Paris–Tours
3rd Nationale Sluitingsprijs
7th Brabantse Pijl
7th GP Ouest-France
8th La Flèche Wallonne
1972
1st Stage 8a Tour de Suisse
1st Stage 4 Giro di Sardegna
1st Stage 4b (TTT) Paris–Nice
3rd GP Union Dortmund
8th Amstel Gold Race
8th Rund um den Henninger Turm
1973
1st Critérium des As
Vuelta a España

1st Stages 2, 5, 7 & 12
Held after Stages 2 & 3
Held after Stages 2 & 5–14

1st Stage 5 Giro d'Italia
3rd Road race, National Road Championships
6th Circuit des Onze Villes
1974
1st Tour du Haut Var
1st Stage 16 Vuelta a España
Setmana Catalana de Ciclisme

1st Stages 3 & 4a

3rd Critérium des As
4th Overall Tour Méditerranéen
4th Grand Prix de Fourmies
4th Circuit de l'Aulne
6th Tour of Flanders
6th E3 Prijs Vlaanderen
9th Paris–Brussels
Tour de France

Held after Stages 5 & 6b
Held after Stage 2

1975
1st Stage 4 Tour de Luxembourg
3rd Omloop der Zennevallei
4th Gent–Wevelgem
5th Overall Ronde van Nederland
5th E3 Prijs Vlaanderen
5th Grand Prix de Momignies
6th Tour of Flanders
8th Omloop van de Vlaamse Scheldeboorden
9th Le Samyn
10th Paris–Roubaix
1976
Tour de France

1st Stages 5a (TTT), 18c & 22b

1st Stage 12 Vuelta a España
3rd Overall Vuelta a Andalucía

1st Prologue, Stages 1b, 2a & 2b

3rd Critérium des As
10th Paris–Brussels
1977
1st Petegem-aan-de-Leie
1st Stage 1 Ronde van Nederland
9th Road race, National Road Championships
1978
3rd Overall Tour de Luxembourg
5th Grand Prix de Fourmies
6th Omloop van het Waasland

=== Grand Tour general classification results timeline ===
Grand Tour	1965	1966	1967	1968	1969	1970	1971	1972	1973	1974	1975	1976	1977	1978
Vuelta a España	—	21	51	—	—	—	39	—	DNF	48	—	DNF	—	—
Giro d'Italia	—	—	—	—	—	—	—	—	23	—	—	—	—	—
Tour de France	59	46	30	—	65	—	63	60	—	61	50	84	52	DNF

Legend
—	Did not compete
DNF	Did not finish

== See also ==
- List of Dutch Olympic cyclists
- List of Dutch cyclists who have led the Tour de France general classification

Sporting positions
Preceded by Jo de Roo	Dutch National Road Race Champion; 1966	Succeeded by No Winner
