= 1973 Gent–Wevelgem =

Race details
- Dates: 3 April 1973
- Stages: 1
- Distance: 250 km (160 mi)
- Winning time: 5h 30' 00"

Results
	Winner	Eddy Merckx (BEL)	(Molteni)
	Second	Frans Verbeeck (BEL)	(Watney–Maes Pils)
	Third	Walter Planckaert (BEL)	(Watney–Maes Pils)

The 1973 Gent–Wevelgem was the 35th edition of the Belgian Gent–Wevelgem cycle race and was held on 3 April 1973. The race started in Ghent and finished in Wevelgem. The race was won by Eddy Merckx of the Molteni team.

== General classification ==
Final general classification

Rank	Rider	Team	Time
1	Eddy Merckx (BEL)	Molteni	5h 30' 00"
2	Frans Verbeeck (BEL)	Watney–Maes Pils	+ 0"
3	Walter Planckaert (BEL)	Watney–Maes Pils	+ 55"
4	Walter Godefroot (BEL)	Flandria–Carpenter–Shimano	+ 55"
5	Freddy Maertens (BEL)	Flandria–Carpenter–Shimano	+ 55"
6	Frans Mintjens (BEL)	Molteni	+ 55"
7	Eric Leman (BEL)	Bic	+ 55"
8	Roger Rosiers (BEL)	Flandria–Carpenter–Shimano	+ 55"
9	Jozef Abelshausen (BEL)	IJsboerke–Bertin	+ 6' 04"
10	Eddy Peelman (BEL)	Rokado–De Gribaldy	+ 6' 04"
