= 1973 Dwars door België =

Race details
- Dates: 25 March 1973
- Stages: 1
- Distance: 199 km (123.7 mi)
- Winning time: 5h 06' 00"

Results
	Winner	Roger Loysch (BEL)
	Second	Jos Abelshausen (BEL)
	Third	Freddy Maertens (BEL)

The 1973 Dwars door België was the 28th edition of the Dwars door Vlaanderen cycle race and was held on 25 March 1973. The race started and finished in Waregem. The race was won by Roger Loysch.

== General classification ==
Final general classification

Rank	Rider	Time
1	Roger Loysch (BEL)	5h 06' 00"
2	Jos Abelshausen (BEL)	+ 0"
3	Freddy Maertens (BEL)	+ 0"
4	Ronny Vanmarcke (BEL)	+ 0"
5	Ronny Van de Vijver (BEL)	+ 1' 05"
6	Eric Leman (BEL)	+ 1' 10"
7	Walter Planckaert (BEL)	+ 1' 10"
8	Dirk Baert (BEL)	+ 1' 10"
9	Frans Verhaegen (BEL)	+ 1' 10"
10	Hervé Vermeeren (BEL)	+ 1' 10"
