= 1973 Amstel Gold Race =

Dutch cycling race

The 1973 Amstel Gold Race was the eighth edition of the annual Amstel Gold Race road bicycle race, held on Sunday April 7, 1973, in the Dutch provinces of Limburg. The race stretched 238 kilometres, with the start in Heerlen and the finish in Meerssen. There were a total of 165 competitors, and 28 cyclists finished the race.

== Result ==
Final result (1–10)
Rank	Rider	Time
1	Eddy Merckx (BEL)	6:38:16
2	Frans Verbeeck (BEL)	+ 3.13
3	Herman Van Springel (BEL)	+ 3.15
4	Joop Zoetemelk (NED)	+ 3.49
5	Hennie Kuiper (NED)	+ 4.15
6	Albert Van Vlierberghe (BEL)	+ 5.35
7	Ronny Dewitte (BEL)	+ 5.40
8	Freddy Maertens (BEL)	+ 5.59
9	Walter Godefroot (BEL)	+ 8.05
10	Santiago Lazcano (ESP)	+ 8.10
