= 1975 Amstel Gold Race =

Dutch cycling race

The 1975 Amstel Gold Race was the tenth edition of the annual Amstel Gold Race road bicycle race, held on Sunday March 29, 1975, in the Dutch provinces of Limburg. The race stretched 238 kilometres, with the start in Heerlen and the finish in Meerssen. There were a total of 138 competitors, and 35 cyclists finished the race.

== Result ==
Final result (1–10)
Rank	Rider	Time
1	Eddy Merckx (BEL)	6:23:33
2	Freddy Maertens (BEL)	+ 0.15
3	Joseph Bruyère (BEL)	+ 2.51
4	André Dierickx (BEL)	+ 0
5	Michel Pollentier (BEL)	+ 0
6	Cees Bal (NED)	+ 0
7	Gerrie Knetemann (NED)	+ 0
8	Dietrich Thurau (FRG)	+ 0
9	Hennie Kuiper (NED)	+ 0
10	Knut Knudsen (NOR)	+ 0
