= 1974 La Flèche Wallonne =

Race details
- Dates: 11 April 1974
- Stages: 1
- Distance: 225 km (139.8 mi)
- Winning time: 5h 55' 00"

Results
	Winner	Frans Verbeeck (BEL)	(Watney–Maes Pils)
	Second	Roger De Vlaeminck (BEL)	(Brooklyn)
	Third	~~Walter Godefroot~~	(~~Carpenter–Confortluxe–Flandria~~)

The 1974 La Flèche Wallonne was the 38th edition of La Flèche Wallonne cycle race and was held on 11 April 1974. The race started and finished in Verviers. The race was won by Frans Verbeeck of the Watney team.

== General classification ==
Final general classification

Rank	Rider	Team	Time
1	Frans Verbeeck (BEL)	Watney–Maes Pils	5h 55' 00"
2	Roger De Vlaeminck (BEL)	Brooklyn	+ 0"
~~3~~	~~Walter Godefroot (BEL)~~	~~Carpenter–Confortluxe–Flandria~~	~~+ 0"~~ (Note: Disqualified for doping.)
4	Eric Leman (BEL)	MIC–Ludo–de Gribaldy	+ 0"
5	Alain Santy (FRA)	Gan–Mercier–Hutchinson	+ 0"
6	Freddy Maertens (BEL)	Carpenter–Confortluxe–Flandria	+ 0"
7	Herman Van Springel (BEL)	MIC–Ludo–de Gribaldy	+ 0"
8	Walter Planckaert (BEL)	Watney–Maes Pils	+ 0"
9	André Dierickx (BEL)	Merlin Plage–Shimano–Flandria	+ 0"
10	Miguel María Lasa (ESP)	Kas–Kaskol	+ 0"
