= 1975 La Flèche Wallonne =

Race details
- Dates: 17 April 1975
- Stages: 1
- Distance: 225 km (139.8 mi)
- Winning time: 5h 48' 44"

Results
	Winner	André Dierickx (BEL)	(Rokado)
	Second	Frans Verbeeck (BEL)	(Maes Pils–Watney)
	Third	Eddy Merckx (BEL)	(Molteni–RYC)

The 1975 La Flèche Wallonne was the 39th edition of La Flèche Wallonne cycle race and was held on 17 April 1975. The race started and finished in Verviers. The race was won by André Dierickx of the Rokado team.

== General classification ==
Final general classification

Rank	Rider	Team	Time
1	André Dierickx (BEL)	Rokado	5h 48' 44"
2	Frans Verbeeck (BEL)	Maes Pils–Watney	+ 0"
3	Eddy Merckx (BEL)	Molteni–RYC	+ 0"
4	Freddy Maertens (BEL)	Carpenter–Confortluxe–Flandria	+ 1' 39"
5	Jean-Pierre Danguillaume (FRA)	Peugeot–BP–Michelin	+ 1' 39"
6	Gerrie Knetemann (NED)	Gan–Mercier–Hutchinson	+ 1' 51"
7	Ferdinand Bracke (BEL)	TI–Raleigh	+ 1' 51"
8	Joop Zoetemelk (NED)	Gan–Mercier–Hutchinson	+ 2' 29"
9	Roger De Vlaeminck (BEL)	Brooklyn	+ 2' 29"
10	Walter Planckaert (BEL)	Maes Pils–Watney	+ 7' 02"
