= 1975 Paris–Tours =

Race details
- Dates: 28 September 1975
- Stages: 1
- Distance: 247 km (153.5 mi)
- Winning time: 5h 59' 21"

Results
	Winner	Freddy Maertens (BEL)
	Second	Frans Van Looy (BEL)
	Third	Roger De Vlaeminck (BEL)

The 1975 Paris–Tours was the 69th edition of the Paris–Tours cycle race and was held on 28 September 1975. The race started in Tours and finished in Versailles. The race was won by Freddy Maertens.

== General classification ==
Final general classification

Rank	Rider	Time
1	Freddy Maertens (BEL)	5h 59' 21"
2	Frans Van Looy (BEL)	+ 0"
3	Roger De Vlaeminck (BEL)	+ 0"
4	Frans Verbeeck (BEL)	+ 0"
5	Jan Raas (NED)	+ 0"
6	Marc Renier (BEL)	+ 0"
7	Gerrie Knetemann (NED)	+ 0"
8	René Pijnen (NED)	+ 0"
9	Eddy Merckx (BEL)	+ 0"
10	Cees Priem (NED)	+ 0"
