= 1970 Amstel Gold Race =

Dutch cycling race

The 1970 Amstel Gold Race was the fifth edition of the annual Amstel Gold Race road bicycle race, held on Sunday April 25, 1970, in the Dutch provinces of North Brabant and Limburg. The race stretched 240 kilometres, with the start in Helmond and the finish in Meerssen. There were a total of 125 competitors, and 41 cyclists finished the race.

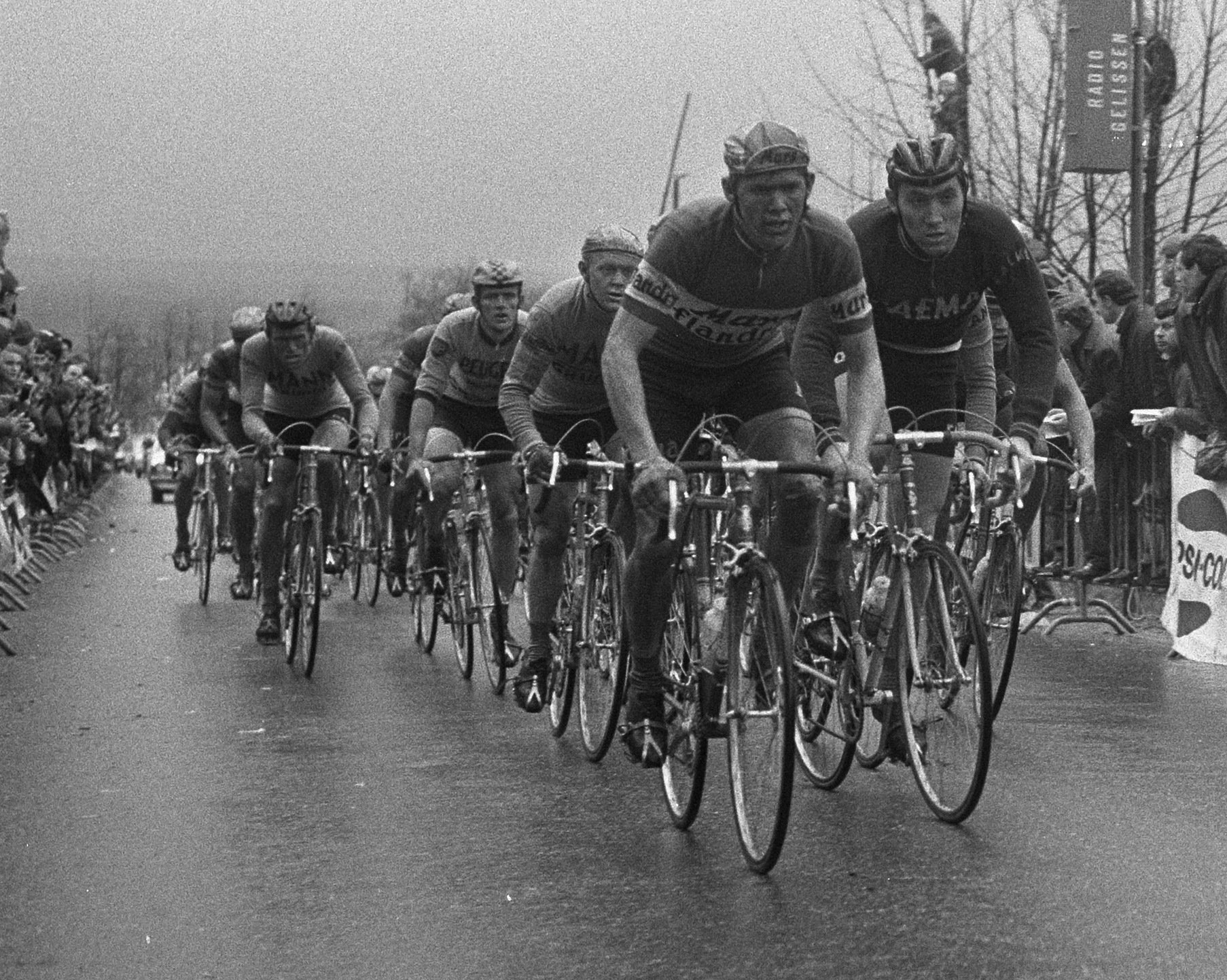
Eddy Merckx and Erik de Vlaeminck leading the peloton

== Result ==
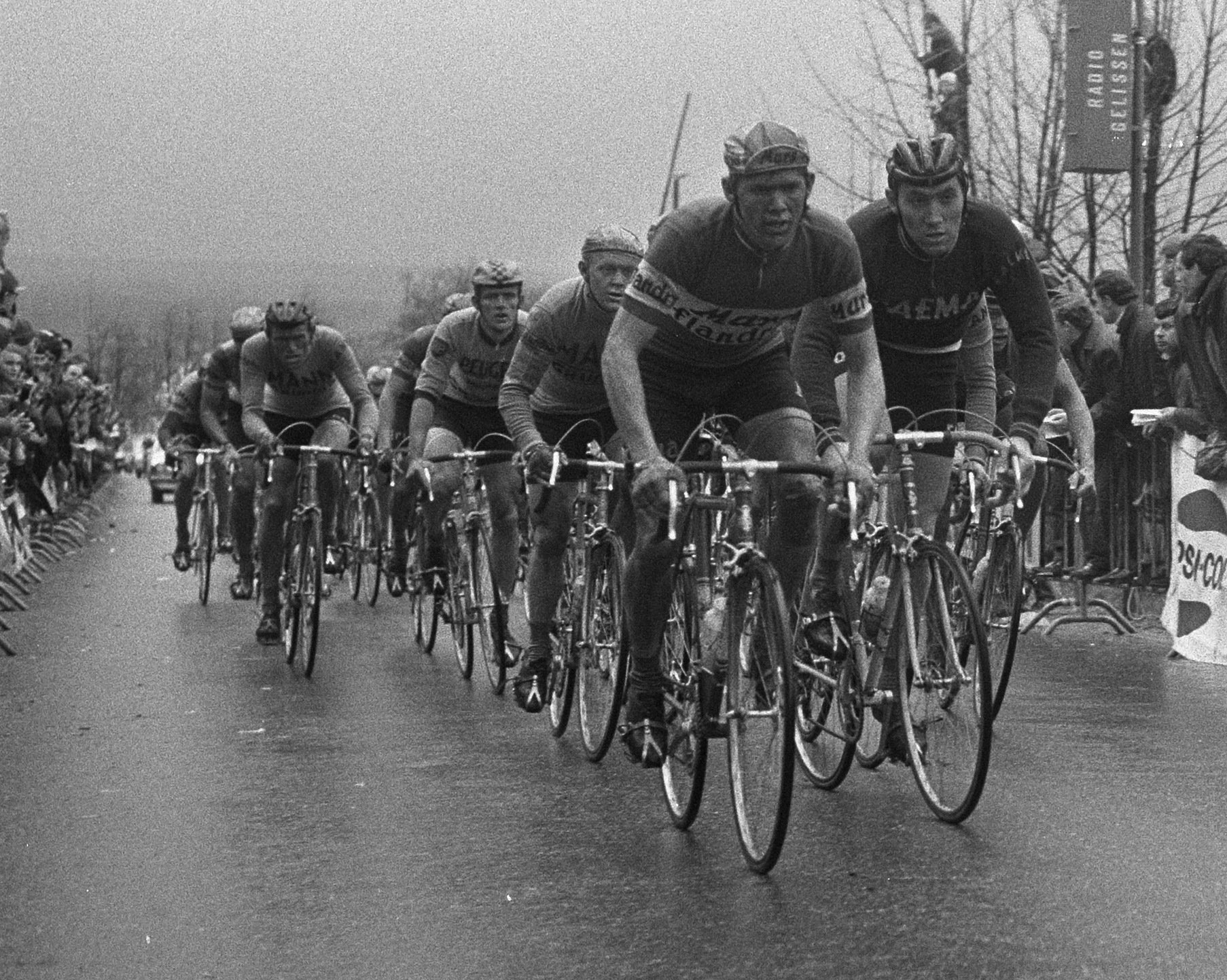
Erik De Vlaeminck leads the peloton, with Eddy Merckx close to him

Final result (1–10)
Rank	Rider	Time
1	Georges Pintens (BEL)	6:21:30
2	Wily Vanneste (BEL)	+ 0
3	André Dierickx (BEL)	+ 0.22
4	Eric Leman (BEL)	+ 0
5	Jos Schoeters (BEL)	+ 0
6	Frans Verbeeck (BEL)	+ 0
7	Jan Krekels (NED)	+ 0
8	Eddy Merckx (BEL)	+ 0
9	Frans Melckenbeeck (BEL)	+ 0
10	Wim Schepers (NED)	+ 0
