= 1976 E3 Prijs Vlaanderen =

1976 E3 Harelbeke
Race details
- Dates: 20 March 1976
- Stages: 1
- Distance: 228 km (142 mi)
- Winning time: 5h 41' 00"

Results
	Winner	Walter Planckaert (BEL)
	Second	Walter Godefroot (BEL)
	Third	Daniel Verplancke (BEL)

The 1976 E3 Harelbeke was the 19th edition of the E3 Harelbeke cycle race and was held on 20 March 1976. The race started and finished in Harelbeke. The race was won by Walter Planckaert.

== General classification ==
Final general classification

Rank	Rider	Time
1	Walter Planckaert (BEL)	5h 41' 00"
2	Walter Godefroot (BEL)	+ 0"
3	Daniel Verplancke (BEL)	+ 25"
4	Eric Leman (BEL)	+ 25"
5	Ronny Van de Vijver (BEL)	+ 25"
6	Roger De Vlaeminck (BEL)	+ 35"
7	Paul Lannoo (BEL)	+ 45"
8	André Delcroix (BEL)	+ 45"
9	Ferdinand Bracke (BEL)	+ 50"
10	Joop Zoetemelk (NED)	+ 1' 35"
