= 1973 Scheldeprijs =

Race details
- Dates: 31 July 1973
- Stages: 1
- Distance: 245 km (152.2 mi)
- Winning time: 5h 54' 00"

Results
	Winner	Freddy Maertens (BEL)
	Second	Louis Verreydt (BEL)
	Third	Marc Demeyer (BEL)

The 1973 Scheldeprijs was the 60th edition of the Scheldeprijs cycle race and was held on 31 July 1973. The race was won by Freddy Maertens.

== General classification ==
Final general classification

Rank	Rider	Time
1	Freddy Maertens (BEL)	5h 54' 00"
2	Louis Verreydt (BEL)	+ 0"
3	Marc Demeyer (BEL)	+ 0"
4	Christian De Buysschere (BEL)	+ 0"
5	Daniel Pauwels (BEL)	+ 0"
6	Jozef Spruyt (BEL)	+ 0"
7	Bernard Bourguignon (BEL)	+ 2' 05"
8	Harm Ottenbros (NED)	+ 2' 05"
9	Eddy Merckx (BEL)	+ 2' 05"
10	Ludo Van Stayen (BEL)	+ 2' 05"
