= 1974 Amstel Gold Race =

Dutch cycling race

The 1974 Amstel Gold Race was the ninth edition of the annual Amstel Gold Race road bicycle race, held on Sunday April 13, 1974, in the Dutch provinces of Limburg. The race stretched 238 kilometres, with the start in Heerlen and the finish in Meerssen. There were a total of 137 competitors, and 31 cyclists finished the race.

== Result ==
Final result (1–10)
Rank	Rider	Time
1	Gerrie Knetemann (NED)	6:06:30
2	Walter Planckaert (BEL)	+ 3.21
3	Walter Godefroot (BEL)	+ 0
4	Freddy Maertens (BEL)	+ 0
5	Staf van Roosbroeck (BEL)	+ 0
6	Gerard Vianen (NED)	+ 0
7	Jan Krekels (NED)	+ 0
8	Tino Tabak (NED)	+ 0
9	Willy Teirlinck (BEL)	+ 0
10	Herman Van Springel (BEL)	+ 0
