= 1974 E3 Prijs Vlaanderen =

1974 E3 Harelbeke
Race details
- Dates: 23 March 1974
- Stages: 1
- Distance: 226 km (140 mi)
- Winning time: 5h 31' 00"

Results
	Winner	Herman Van Springel (BEL)
	Second	Freddy Maertens (BEL)
	Third	Frans Verbeeck (BEL)

The 1974 E3 Harelbeke was the 17th edition of the E3 Harelbeke cycle race and was held on 23 March 1974. The race started and finished in Harelbeke. The race was won by Herman Van Springel.

== General classification ==
Final general classification

Rank	Rider	Time
1	Herman Van Springel (BEL)	5h 31' 00"
2	Freddy Maertens (BEL)	+ 0"
3	Frans Verbeeck (BEL)	+ 8"
4	Walter Godefroot (BEL)	+ 8"
5	Eddy Peelman (BEL)	+ 8"
6	Gerben Karstens (NED)	+ 8"
7	Frans Van Looy (BEL)	+ 8"
8	Eric Leman (BEL)	+ 8"
9	Marc Demeyer (BEL)	+ 8"
10	Marc Lievens (BEL)	+ 8"
