= 1977 Omloop Het Volk =

Race details
- Dates: 5 March 1977
- Stages: 1
- Distance: 201 km (125 mi)
- Winning time: 4h 41' 00"

Results
	Winner	Freddy Maertens (BEL)
	Second	Jan Raas (NED)
	Third	Ludo Peeters (BEL)

The 1977 Omloop Het Volk was the 32nd edition of the Omloop Het Volk cycle race and was held on 5 March 1977. The race started and finished in Ghent. The race was won by Freddy Maertens.

== General classification ==
Final general classification
Rank	Rider	Time
1	Freddy Maertens (BEL)	4h 41' 00"
2	Jan Raas (NED)	+ 0"
3	Ludo Peeters (BEL)	+ 1' 04"
4	Jean-Luc Vandenbroucke (BEL)	+ 1' 04"
5	Eddy Merckx (BEL)	+ 1' 04"
6	Walter Godefroot (BEL)	+ 1' 04"
7	Patrick Sercu (BEL)	+ 1' 04"
8	Roger De Vlaeminck (BEL)	+ 1' 04"
9	Eric Leman (BEL)	+ 1' 04"
10	Wilfried Wesemael (BEL)	+ 1' 04"
