= 1972 Omloop Het Volk =

Race details
- Dates: 4 March 1972
- Stages: 1
- Distance: 198 km (123 mi)
- Winning time: 4h 51' 00"

Results
	Winner	Frans Verbeeck (BEL)
	Second	André Dierickx (BEL)
	Third	Eddy Merckx (BEL)

The 1972 Omloop Het Volk was the 27th edition of the Omloop Het Volk cycle race and was held on 4 March 1972. The race started and finished in Ghent. The race was won by Frans Verbeeck.

== General classification ==
Final general classification
Rank	Rider	Time
1	Frans Verbeeck (BEL)	4h 51' 00"
2	André Dierickx (BEL)	+ 0"
3	Eddy Merckx (BEL)	+ 0"
4	Willy De Geest (BEL)	+ 0"
5	Joseph Abelshausen (BEL)	+ 16"
6	Rolf Wolfshohl (FRG)	+ 16"
7	Walter Godefroot (BEL)	+ 28"
8	Walter Planckaert (BEL)	+ 28"
9	Noël Vantyghem (BEL)	+ 28"
10	Jacky Mourioux (FRA)	+ 28"
