= GP Roeselare =

Recurring sporting event

Race details
- Date: May, June
- Region: Flanders, Belgium
- English name: GP Roeselare
- Local name(s): Bankprijs (Dutch)
- Discipline: Road
- Type: One-day

History
- First edition: 1947
- Editions: 24
- Final edition: 1976
- First winner: Achiel Buysse (BEL)
- Most wins: René Mertens (BEL); Frans Melckenbeeck (BEL); Freddy Maertens (BEL) (2 wins)
- Final winner: Marc De Meyer (BEL)

The GP Roeselare (officially Grote Prijs van de Bank van Roeselare en West-Vlaanderen) was a post WW II-men's cycling race organized for the last time in 1976. The start and finish place was Roeselare (West Flanders, Belgium).

The competition's roll of honor includes the successes of Rik Van Looy, Patrick Sercu and Freddy Maertens.

== Winners ==
Year	Winner	Second	Third
1947	(Belgium) Achiel Buysse	(Belgium) Julien Heernaert	(Belgium) Edward Peeters
1948–1951	No race		
1952	(Belgium) Emmanuel Thoma	(Belgium) Omer Braekevelt	(Belgium) Roger Desmet
1953	(Belgium) René Mertens	(Belgium) Herni Denys	(Belgium) Julien Pascal
1954	(Belgium) René Mertens	(Belgium) Joseph Theuns	(Belgium) Florent Rondelé
1955	(Belgium) Joseph De Feyter	(Belgium) René Mertens	(Belgium) Lucien Demunster
1956	(Belgium) Jean Branckart	(Belgium) Jan Delin	(Netherlands) Wout Wagtmans
1957	(Belgium) Rik Van Looy	(Belgium) Jean Adriaenssens	(Belgium) Noël Foré
1958	(Belgium) Robert Depauw	(Belgium) Briek Schotte	(Belgium) Julien Schepens
1959	(Belgium) Roger Baens	(Belgium) Rik Luyten	(Belgium) Léopold Rosseel
1960	(Belgium) Julien Schepens	(Belgium) Albert Van Eeckhout	(Belgium) Willy Truye
1961	(Belgium) Noël Foré	(Belgium) Yvo Molenaers	(Belgium) Louis Proost
1962	(Belgium) Frans Aerenhouts	(Belgium) Armand Desmet	(Belgium) Marcel Seynaeve
1963	(Belgium) Frans Melckenbeeck	(Belgium) Noël Foré	(Belgium) Gilbert Desmet
1964	(Belgium) Frans Melckenbeeck	(Belgium) Arthur Decabooter	(Belgium) Benoni Beheyt
1965	(Belgium) Gustaaf De Smet	(Belgium) Constant Jongen	(Belgium) Kamiel Vyncke
1966	(Belgium) Edouard Sels	(Belgium) Gustaaf De Smet	(Denmark) Palle Lykke Jensen
1967	No race		
1968	(Belgium) Walter Boucquet	(Belgium) Raymond Steegmans	(Belgium) Gustaaf De Smet
1969	(Belgium) Eric Leman	(Belgium) Erik De Vlaeminck	(United Kingdom) Barry Hoban
1970	(Belgium) André Dierickx	(Belgium) Jean-Pierre Monseré	(Belgium) Roger De Vlaeminck
1971	(Belgium) Patrick Sercu	(Belgium) Noël Van Clooster	(Belgium) Willy Planckaert
1972	No race		
1973	(Belgium) Freddy Maertens	(Belgium) Walter Planckaert	(Netherlands) Théo Van Der Leeuw
1974	(Belgium) Albert Van Vlierberghe	(Belgium) Walter Planckaert	(Belgium) Frans Verbeeck
1975	(Belgium) Freddy Maertens	(Belgium) Frans Verbeeck	(Belgium) Marc Demeyer
1976	(Belgium) Marc Demeyer	(Belgium) Pol Verschuere	(Belgium) Walter Planckaert
