= Bruxelles–Meulebeke =

Belgian cycling race

Brussels–Meulebeke
Race details
- Date: May
- Region: Brabant, East-Flanders, West-Flanders Belgium
- English name: Brussels–Meulebeke
- Local name(s): Brussel–Meulebeke (in Dutch) Bruxelles–Meulebeke (in French)
- Discipline: Road
- Competition: Cat 1.1
- Type: One-day race

History
- First edition: 1964
- Editions: 12
- Final edition: 1975
- First winner: Rik Van Looy (BEL)
- Most wins: Freddy Maertens (BEL); (3 wins)
- Final winner: Freddy Maertens (BEL)

Brussels–Meulebeke (Dutch: Brussel–Meulebeke) was a men's road cycling road race held in Belgium annually in May from 1964 to 1975. The competition's roll of honor includes two victories by Rik Van Looy and Eddy Merckx. The record of victories, however, belongs to Freddy Maertens. The race has always been won by Belgian riders.

The last part of this race was cycled behind Dernys.

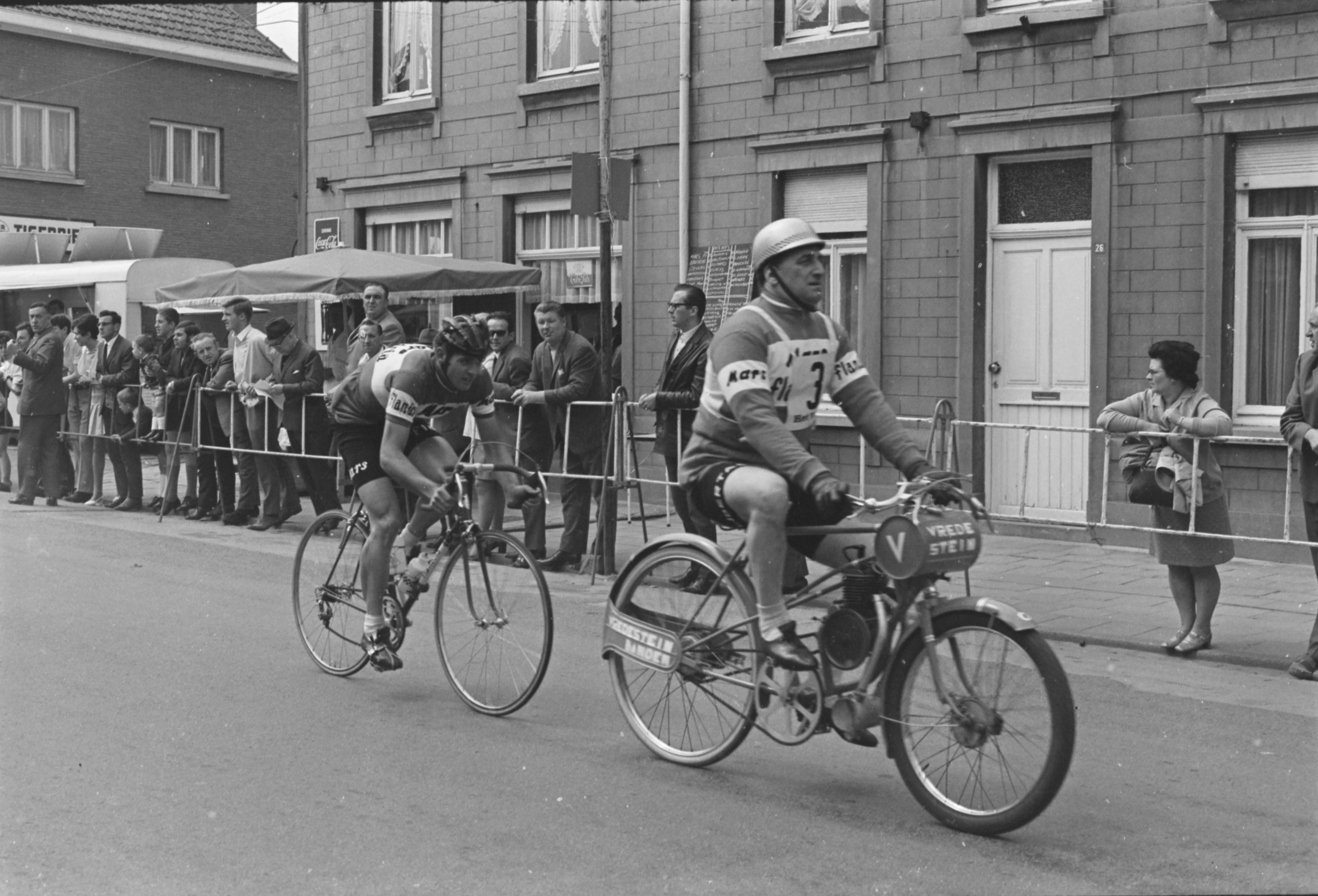
Jean-Pierre Monseré in the 1970 Brussels–Meulebeke final

== Winners ==
Year	Winner	Second	Third
1964	(Belgium) Rik Van Looy	(Belgium) Willy Bocklant	(Belgium) Ward Sels
1965	(Belgium) Rik Van Looy	(Belgium) Jozef Huysmans	(Belgium) Guillaume Van Tongerloo
1966	(Belgium) Eddy Merckx	(Belgium) Walter Godefroot	(Belgium) Bernard Van de Kerckhove
1967	(Belgium) Noël Foré	(Belgium) Walter Godefroot	(Belgium) Daniel Van Rijckeghem
1968	(Belgium) Noël Foré	(Belgium) Herman Van Springel	(Belgium) Daniel Van Rijckeghem
1969	(Belgium) Eddy Merckx	(Belgium) Herman Van Springel	(Belgium) Roger De Vlaeminck
1970	(Belgium) Walter Boucquet	(Belgium) Jean-Pierre Monseré	(Belgium) Roger De Vlaeminck
1971	(Belgium) Herman Van Springel	(Belgium) Albert Van Vlierberghe	(Belgium) Noël Van Clooster
1972	(Belgium) Albert Van Vlierberghe	(Belgium) Noël Van Clooster	(Belgium) Ronny Van De Vijver
1973	(Belgium) Freddy Maertens	(Belgium) Ludo Van Der Linden	(Belgium) Willy Teirlinck
1974	(Belgium) Freddy Maertens	(Belgium) Wilfried Wesemael	(Belgium) Walter Planckaert
1975	(Belgium) Freddy Maertens	(Germany) Dietrich Thurau	(Netherlands) René Pijnen
