= 1975 Grote Prijs Jef Scherens =

Race details
- Dates: 21 September 1975
- Stages: 1
- Distance: 202 km (125.5 mi)
- Winning time: 4h 53' 00"

Results
	Winner	Freddy Maertens (BEL)
	Second	Ronny Van De Vijver (BEL)
	Third	Eddy Merckx (BEL)

The 1975 Grote Prijs Jef Scherens was the 11th edition of the Grote Prijs Jef Scherens cycle race and was held on 21 September 1975. The race started and finished in Leuven. The race was won by Freddy Maertens.

== General classification ==
Final general classification

Rank	Rider	Time
1	Freddy Maertens (BEL)	4h 53' 00"
2	Ronny Van De Vijver (BEL)	+ 0"
3	Eddy Merckx (BEL)	+ 0"
4	Eric Van De Wiele (BEL)	+ 0"
5	Luc Leman (BEL)	+ 0"
6	Jean-Pierre Baert (BEL)	+ 0"
7	Michael Wright (GBR)	+ 0"
8	Herman Van Springel (BEL)	+ 0"
9	Jean Vanderstappen (BEL)	+ 0"
10	Ronald De Witte (BEL)	+ 0"
