= 1977 Paris–Nice =

Race details
- Dates: 10–17 March 1977
- Stages: 7 + Prologue
- Distance: 1,219.4 km (757.7 mi)
- Winning time: 31h 38' 31"

Results
Jersey awarded to the overall winner	Winner	Freddy Maertens (BEL)	(Flandria–Velda–Latina Assicurazioni)
	Second	Gerrie Knetemann (NED)	(TI–Raleigh)
	Third	Bernard Thévenet (FRA)	(Peugeot–Esso–Michelin)

The 1977 Paris–Nice was the 35th edition of the Paris–Nice cycle race and was held from 10 March to 17 March 1977. The race started in Paris and finished in Nice. The race was won by Freddy Maertens of the Flandria team.

== General classification ==
Final general classification

Rank	Rider	Team	Time
1	Freddy Maertens (BEL)	Flandria–Velda–Latina Assicurazioni	31h 38' 31"
2	Gerrie Knetemann (NED)	TI–Raleigh	+ 33"
3	Bernard Thévenet (FRA)	Peugeot–Esso–Michelin	+ 48"
4	Jean-Luc Vandenbroucke (BEL)	Peugeot–Esso–Michelin	+ 1' 25"
5	Joseph Bruyère (BEL)	Fiat France	+ 1' 35"
6	Bernard Hinault (FRA)	Gitane–Campagnolo	+ 1' 42"
7	Raymond Poulidor (FRA)	Miko–Mercier–Vivagel	+ 1' 49"
8	Dietrich Thurau (FRG)	TI–Raleigh	+ 1' 56"
9	Jan Raas (NED)	Frisol–Thirion–Gazelle	+ 2' 03"
10	Roland Salm (SUI)	Zonca	+ 2' 22"
