= 1977 Volta a Catalunya =

Race details
- Dates: 7–14 September 1977
- Stages: 7 + Prologue
- Distance: 1,175.9 km (730.7 mi)
- Winning time: 34h 04' 51"

Results
	Winner	Freddy Maertens (BEL)	(Flandria–Velda–Latina Assicurazioni)
	Second	Johan De Muynck (BEL)	(Brooklyn)
	Third	Joop Zoetemelk (NED)	(Miko–Mercier–Vivagel)
	Points	Freddy Maertens (BEL)	(Flandria–Velda–Latina Assicurazioni)
	Mountains	Manuel Esparza (ESP)	(Teka)
	Sprints	Enrique Martínez Heredia (ESP)	(Kas–Campagnolo)
	Team	Kas–Campagnolo	

The 1977 Volta a Catalunya was the 57th edition of the Volta a Catalunya cycle race and was held from 7 to 14 September 1977. The race started and finished in Sitges. The race was won by Freddy Maertens of the Flandria–Velda–Latina Assicurazioni team.

== General classification ==
Final general classification

Rank	Rider	Team	Time
1	Freddy Maertens (BEL)	Flandria–Velda–Latina Assicurazioni	33h 04' 51"
2	Johan De Muynck (BEL)	Brooklyn	+ 02"
3	Joop Zoetemelk (NED)	Miko–Mercier–Vivagel	+ 1' 27"
4	Juan Pujol (ESP)	Kas–Campagnolo	+ 2' 19"
5	José Luis Viejo (ESP)	Kas–Campagnolo	+ 2' 37"
6	Enrique Martínez Heredia (ESP)	Kas–Campagnolo	+ 2' 39"
7	Manuel Esparza (ESP)	Teka	+ 2' 53"
8	Francisco Galdós (ESP)	Kas–Campagnolo	+ 3' 14"
9	Alfio Vandi (ITA)	Magniflex–Torpado	+ 3' 30"
10	Pedro Torres (ESP)	Teka	+ 3' 42"
