= 1976 Scheldeprijs =

Race details
- Dates: 27 July 1976
- Stages: 1
- Distance: 246 km (152.9 mi)
- Winning time: 5h 45' 50"

Results
	Winner	Frans Verbeeck (BEL)
	Second	Roger De Vlaeminck (BEL)

The 1976 Scheldeprijs was the 63rd edition of the Scheldeprijs cycle race and was held on 27 July 1976. The race was won by Frans Verbeeck.

== General classification ==
Final general classification

Rank	Rider	Time
~~1~~	~~Gustaaf Van Roosbroeck (BEL)~~	(Note: Roosbroeck was disqualified.)
1	Frans Verbeeck (BEL)	5h 45' 50"
2	Roger De Vlaeminck (BEL)	+ 0"
4	Frans Van Looy (BEL)	+ 0"
5	Jos Jacobs (BEL)	+ 0"
6	Eric Leman (BEL)	+ 0"
7	Marc Demeyer (BEL)	+ 0"
8	Ludo Van Stayen (BEL)	+ 0"
9	Willem Peeters (BEL)	+ 0"
10	Ludo Peeters (BEL)	+ 0"
