= 1978 Omloop Het Volk =

Race details
- Dates: 4 March 1978
- Stages: 1
- Distance: 218 km (135 mi)
- Winning time: 5h 07' 30"

Results
	Winner	Freddy Maertens (BEL)
	Second	Fons van Katwijk (NED)
	Third	Jan Raas (NED)

The 1978 Omloop Het Volk was the 33rd edition of the Omloop Het Volk cycle race and was held on 4 March 1978. The race started and finished in Ghent. The race was won by Freddy Maertens.

== General classification ==
Final general classification
Rank	Rider	Time
1	Freddy Maertens (BEL)	5h 07' 30"
2	Fons van Katwijk (NED)	+ 0"
3	Jan Raas (NED)	+ 0"
4	André Dierickx (BEL)	+ 0"
5	Dietrich Thurau (FRG)	+ 0"
6	Etienne Van Der Helst (BEL)	+ 5"
7	Ronan De Meyer (BEL)	+ 25"
8	Guido Van Calster (BEL)	+ 38"
9	Marc Demeyer (BEL)	+ 38"
10	Walter Godefroot (BEL)	+ 38"
