= 1972 Amstel Gold Race =

The 1972 Amstel Gold Race was the seventh edition of the annual Amstel Gold Race road bicycle race, held on Sunday March 26, 1972, in the Dutch province of Limburg. The race stretched 237 kilometres, with the start in Heerlen and the finish in Meerssen. There were a total number of 97 competitors, and 29 cyclists finished the race.

== Result ==
Final result (1–10)
Rank	Rider	Time
1	Walter Planckaert (BEL)	6:17:39
2	Willy de Geest (BEL)	+ 0
3	Joop Zoetemelk (NED)	+ 0
4	Gerard Vianen (NED)	+ 0.14
5	Willy Planckaert (BEL)	+ 0
6	André Dierickx (BEL)	+ 0
7	Frans Verbeeck (BEL)	+ 0
8	Gerben Karstens (NED)	+ 0
9	Rik Van Linden (BEL)	+ 1.32
10	Willy Teirlinck (BEL)	+ 0
