= 1975 Gent–Wevelgem =

- Official poster of the event

Race details
- Dates: 9 April 1975
- Stages: 1
- Distance: 250 km (160 mi)
- Winning time: 6h 14' 00"

Results
	Winner	Freddy Maertens (BEL)	(Carpenter–Confortluxe–Flandria)
	Second	Frans Verbeeck (BEL)	(Maes Pils–Watney)
	Third	Rik Van Linden (BEL)	(Bianchi–Campagnolo)

The 1975 Gent–Wevelgem was the 37th edition of the Belgian Gent–Wevelgem cycle race and was held on 9 April 1975. The race started in Ghent and finished in Wevelgem. The race was won by Freddy Maertens of the Carpenter team.

== General classification ==
Final general classification

Rank	Rider	Team	Time
1	Freddy Maertens (BEL)	Carpenter–Confortluxe–Flandria	6h 14' 00"
2	Frans Verbeeck (BEL)	Maes Pils–Watney	+ 0"
3	Rik Van Linden (BEL)	Bianchi–Campagnolo	+ 0"
4	Gerben Karstens (NED)	Gitane–Campagnolo	+ 0"
5	Marc Demeyer (BEL)	Carpenter–Confortluxe–Flandria	+ 0"
6	Eddy Merckx (BEL)	Molteni–RYC	+ 0"
7	André Dierickx (BEL)	Rokado	+ 0"
8	Francesco Moser (ITA)	Filotex	+ 0"
9	Roger Swerts (BEL)	IJsboerke–Colner	+ 0"
10	Michel Pollentier (BEL)	Carpenter–Confortluxe–Flandria	+ 0"
