= Albert Van Vlierberghe =

Belgian cyclist

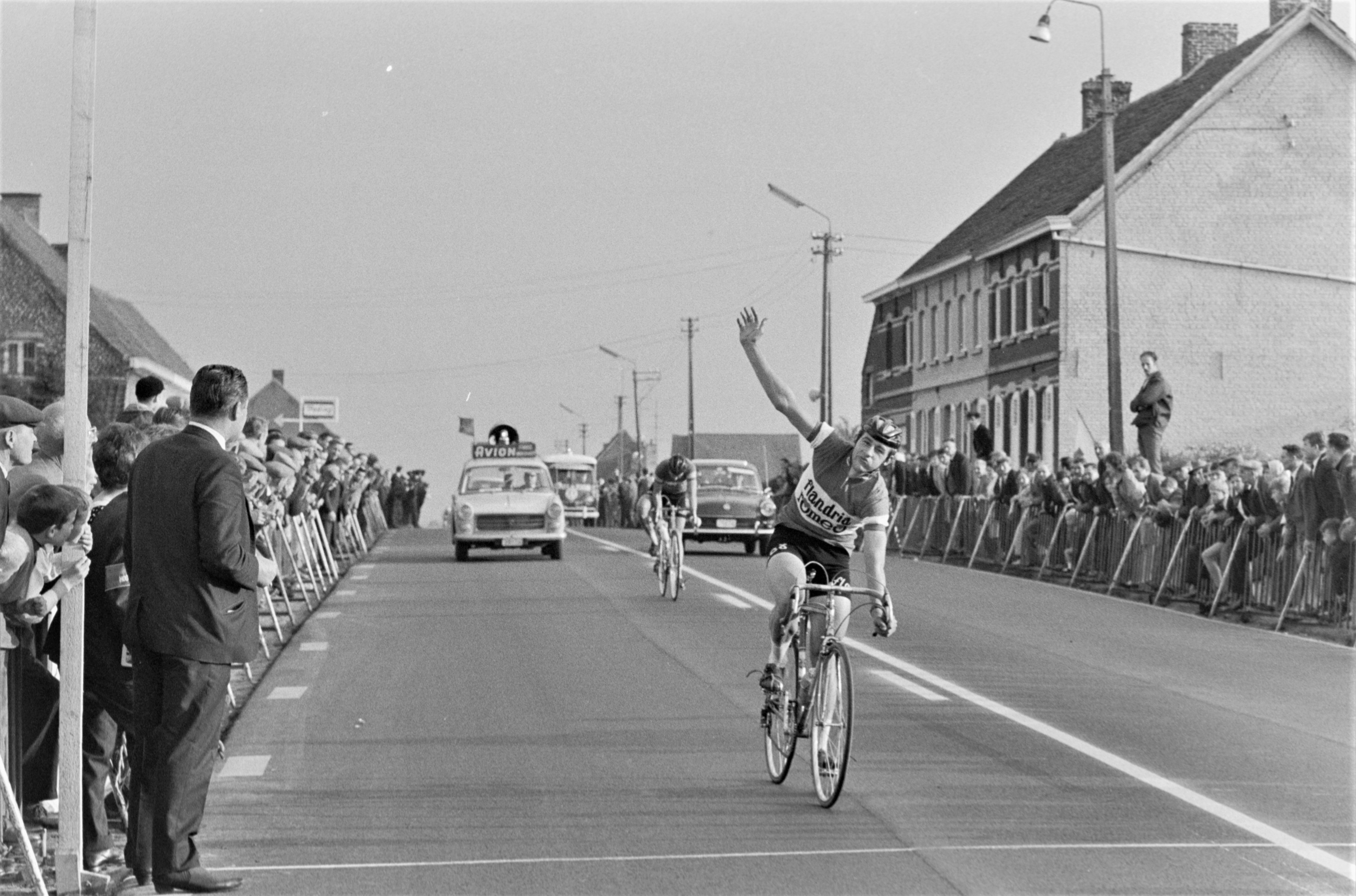
- Albert Van Vlierberghe (1965)

Personal information
- Full name: Albert Van Vlierberghe
- Born: 18 March 1942 Belsele, Belgium
- Died: 20 December 1991 (aged 49) Sint-Niklaas, Belgium

Cycling career
- Sport: Cycling
- Discipline: Road
- Role: Rider

Major wins
- 3 stages Tour de France; 3 stages Giro d'Italia

Albert Van Vlierberghe (18 March 1942 – 20 December 1991) was a Belgian professional road bicycle racer. Van Vlierberghe won three stages in the Tour de France, and three stages in the Giro d'Italia. He also competed in the team time trial and the team pursuit events at the 1964 Summer Olympics.

In his 1999 book, Breaking the Chain: Drugs and Cycling, the True Story, Belgian sports physiotherapist Willy Voet described an incident involving Van Vlierberghe that occurred during the 1979 Deutschland Tour. Voet, then the soigneur with Van Vlierberghe's team, Flandria, claims that Van Vlierberghe, "a decent Belgian racer but with no taste for the hills," asked Voet to drive him ahead of his fellow racers to avoid a six-mile stretch of hill in the course. Voet claims that Van Vlierberghe slipped back into the race without being detected and went on to place sixth on the stage. Voet used the incident to defend his assertion that for many professional riders at the time, cheating was "a way of life."

== Major results ==
1963
National Road Championships

1st Amateur road race

1965
Volta a Portugal

1st stage 17

1st Tour du Loir-et-Cher

1st stage 3

1966
1st Mere
Tour de France:

1st stage 7

1st Westouter
1st Omloop der Vlaamse Gewesten
1st Belsele – Puivelde
Tour de Romandie

1st prologue TTT

1st Strombeek-Bever
2nd Omloop Mandel-Leie-Schelde
3rd GP Stad Vilvoorde
1967
1st Kemzeke
1st Kortrijk
1st Malderen
Giro d'Italia:

1st stage 9

1968
1st Belsele – Puivelde
1st De Kustpijl
1st Stekene
1st Zwijnaarde
3rd Omloop van Oost-Vlaanderen
1969
1st GP Hannut
1st Oostakker
1st Sint-Martens-Lierde
Giro d'Italia:

1st stage 5
2nd stage 2

1st Giro delle Tre Province
Giro di Sardegna

1st stage 4

2nd Dwars door Vlaanderen
2nd Overall Tirreno–Adriatico

2nd stage 4
2nd stage 5

2nd Poperinge – Harelbeke
3rd GP Cemab
1970
Tour de France

Winner stage 16

1st Flèche Rebecquoise
1st Harelbeke – Poperinge – Harelbeke
3rd De Pinte
1971
Tour de France:

1st stage 1c

1st Alassio
1st GP E5 Heverlee
1st Harelbeke – Poperinge – Harelbeke
1st Houthulst
Omloop van de Fruitstreek Alken
1st Sassari – Cagliari
1st Sint-Gillis-Waas
1st Waasmunster
1st GP Hannut
1st Grote Prijs Stad Zottegem
2nd Bruxelles–Meulebeke
1972
1st Bruxelles–Meulebeke
1st De Panne II
Giro d'Italia:

Winner stage 9

1st GP Hannut
1st Maria-Aalter
1st Ottignies
1st Sinaai
2nd Giro della Provincia di Reggio Calabria
5th Overall Giro di Sardegna
1973
1st Grand Prix de Wallonie
Paris-Nice

1st stage 6 TTT

1st Lokeren
1st Omloop Scheldeboorden
Tour of Belgium

1st prologue TTT
1st points classification

3rd Omloop Het Volk
1974
1st GP Roeselare
1st Ninove
1st Oostakker
1st Sinaai
1st Zele
1975
1st Belsele – Puivelde
1st Bilzen
3rd Grand Prix Impanis-Van Petegem
1976
2nd Omloop van Oost-Vlaanderen
1st Zwevezele
1977
1st GP Gemeente Kortemark
1st Zele
3rd Grand Prix de Denain
3rd Stekene
1978
1st Baasrode
2nd Grand Prix de Wallonie
2nd Circuit de la Région Linière
1979
1st Sint-Martens-Lierde
1980
1st Baasrode
1st Belsele
