= Cees Bal =

Dutch racing cyclist

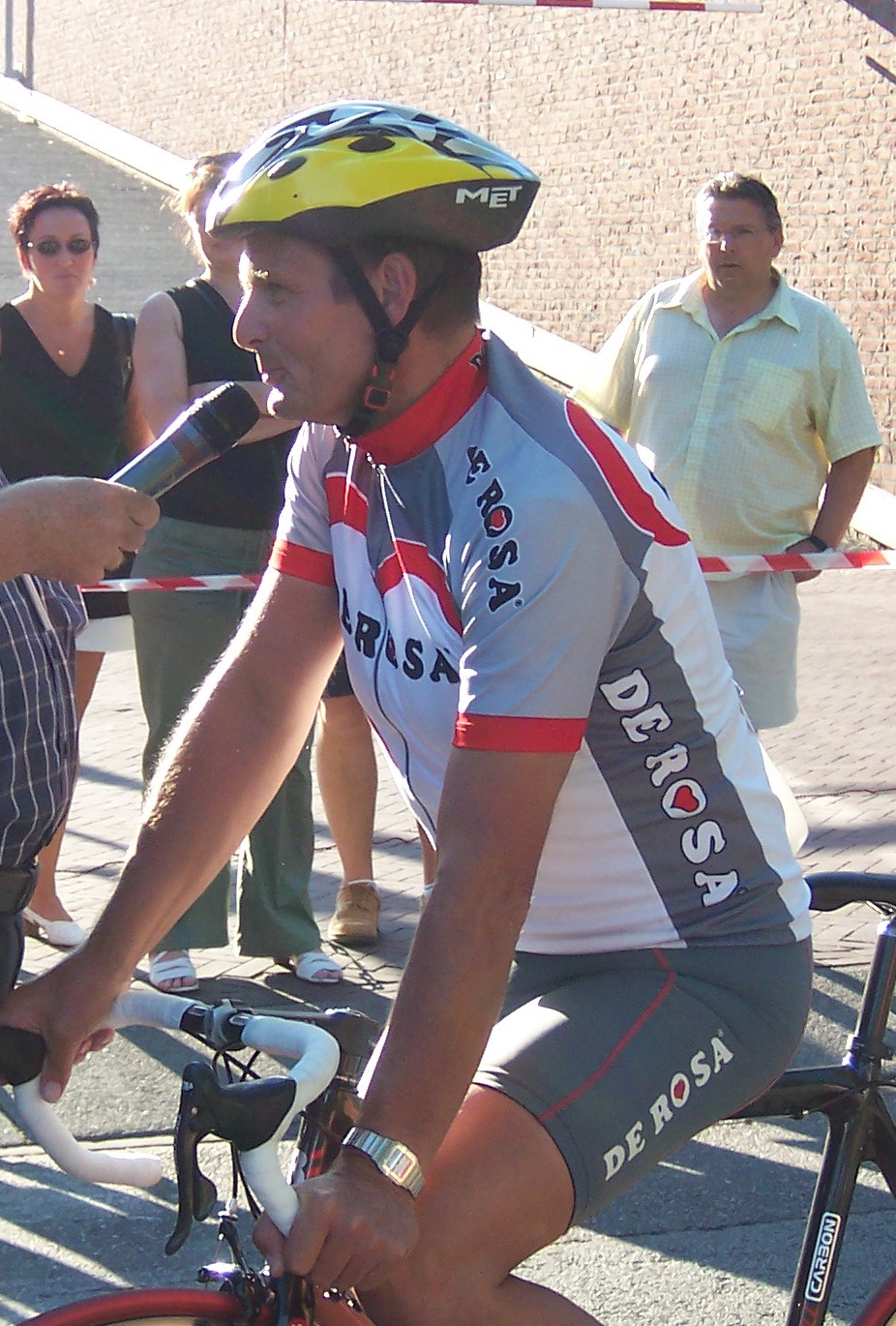
- Cees Bal, was a Dutch racing cyclist

Personal information
- Full name: Cornelius Bal
- Born: 21 November 1951 (age 74) Kwadendamme, Netherlands

Cycling career
- Sport: Cycling
- Discipline: Road
- Role: Rider

Professional teams
- 1973–1975: Gan–Mercier
- 1976: Molteni–Campagnolo
- 1977: Fiat France
- 1978: Bode Deuren–Shimano
- 1979: Lano–Boule d'Or

Major wins
- Tour of Flanders (1974)

Cornelius Bal (born 21 November 1951) is a Dutch former racing cyclist. He is mostly known for winning the Tour of Flanders in 1974.

== Career ==
In 1974, Bal was part of the Gan–Mercier cycling team, and was a team mate of Joop Zoetemelk. In the Setmana Catalana de Ciclisme, Bal won the first stage, and after the fourth stage was still leading the general classification with a margin of four minutes. In the fifth and final stage, Eddy Merckx escaped from the start, and Zoetemelk joined him. Zoetemelk did not need to work because his team mate was leading the race, and Merckx and Zoetemelk did not get far away. Merckx's directeur sportif then told him to stop trying, and save energy for the next race. Hearing this, Zoetemelk escaped, and stayed away, winning the general classification.

Bal was not pleased with this, and felt betrayed. Two days later, the Tour of Flanders would be held, but Bal refused to sleep in the same hotel as Zoetemelk, and preferred to stay in his own house in the Netherlands. In the morning, he rode to the start of the Ronde, and fueled by anger, won the race, age 22.

In the next weekend, during the 1974 Amstel Gold Race, Bal crashed, breaking his ankle. He could not race for six weeks, and was convinced by friends to go to parties. He enjoyed this so much, that he never got back to his former level.

During the 1976 Giro d'Italia, Bal tested positive for strychnine, and got a penalty of ten minutes in the general classification.

Bal later admitted that he used doping during his career, but claimed to be clean during his Tour of Flanders victory.

== Palmarès ==
1974
Tour of Flanders
1979
Stage 18b, Vuelta a España
