= Frans Verbeeck (cyclist) =

Belgian cyclist (1941–2026)

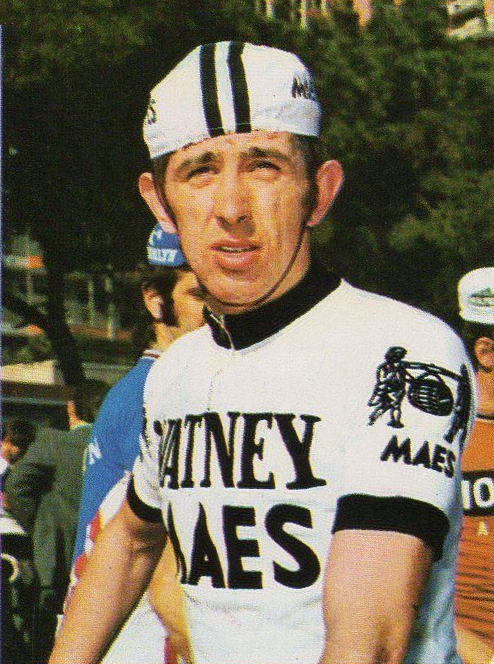
- Verbeeck in 1973

Personal information
- Nickname: Flying Milkman
- Born: 13 June 1941 Langdorp, Belgium
- Died: 21 August 2026 (aged 85)

Cycling career
- Sport: Cycling
- Discipline: Road
- Role: Rider

Professional teams
- 1963: Marcel Kint–Reno
- 1964–1966: Wiel's–Groene Leeuw
- 1968–1969: Okay Whisky–Diamant
- 1970: Geens–Watney
- 1971–1972: Watneys–Avia
- 1973–1975: Maes–Watney
- 1976–1977: IJsboerke–Colnago

Major wins
- Grand Tours Tour de France 1 TTT Stage (1973) Stage races Tour de l'Oise (1970) Tour de Luxembourg (1975, 1976) One-day races and Classics Amstel Gold Race (1970) Omloop Het Volk (1970, 1972) National Road Race Championship (1973) La Flèche Wallonne (1974) E3 Prijs Vlaanderen (1975) Scheldeprijs (1976) Brabantse Pijl (1977)

Frans Verbeeck (13 June 1941 – 21 August 2026) was a Belgian road bicycle racer.

Verbeeck managed to win 66 races in an era of legendary cyclists like Eddy Merckx and Roger De Vlaeminck, something he also combined for a long time with his job as a milkman. After his career, he became a successful businessman with his clothing company, Vermarc Sport.

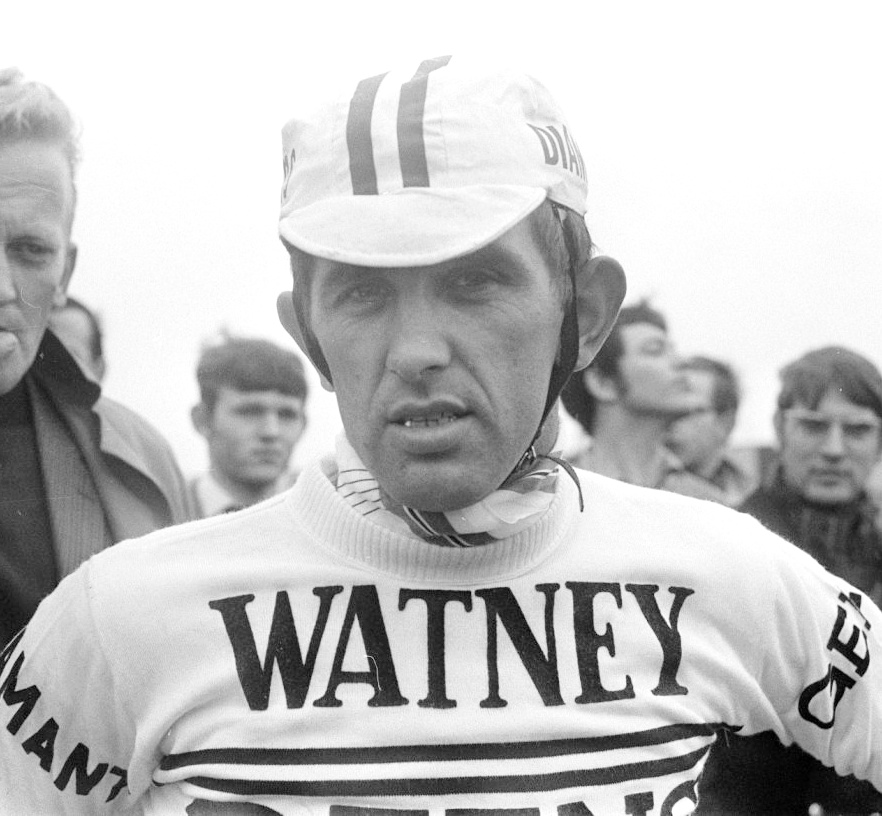
Verbeeck at the start of the 1970 Amstel Gold Race

Verbeeck died on 21 August 2026, at the age of 85.

== Major results ==
1964
1st GP Dr. Eugeen Roggeman
2nd Grand Prix de Denain
1965
2nd Frankfurt Grand Prix
3rd Grand Prix de Denain
1968
3rd GP Union Dortmund
1969
1st Grote Prijs Jef Scherens
1st Omloop der Vlaamse Gewesten
1st Circuit du Tournaisis
2nd Paris–Tours
2nd Druivenkoers Overijse
3rd Grote 1-MeiPrijs
1970
1st Omloop Het Volk
1st Grote Prijs Jef Scherens
1st Stage 1a Tour of Belgium
1st Overall Tour de l'Oise

1st Stage 2

1st Stage 1 Tour de Luxembourg
1st Flèche Hesbignonne
1st Omloop van de Fruitstreek
1st Brussels–Merchtem
1971
1st Amstel Gold Race
1st Grand Prix de Cannes
1st Grote Prijs Jef Scherens
1st Flèche Halloise
1st Stage 1 and 5 Four Days of Dunkirk
1st Stage 1, 3, 4 and 5 Tour de Luxembourg
1st Grand Prix de Monaco
1st Leeuwse Pijl
1st Circuit du Tournaisis
1st Grand Prix d'Antibes
1st Brussels–Merchtem
1st Hoeilaart–Diest–Hoeilaart
1972
1st GP Frans Verbeeck
1st Omloop Het Volk
1st Tour du Haut-Var
1st Grand Prix de Nice
1st Grand Prix de Monaco
1st Stage 2 Critérium du Dauphiné Libéré
1st Stages 3 and 5a Tour of Belgium
1st Stages 1, 3 and 5 Tour du Nord
1st Leeuwse Pijl
1st Grand Prix de Saint-Tropez
1st Trèfle à Quatre Feuilles
3rd Tour of Flanders
1973
1st National Road Race Championship
1st Stage 1 Critérium du Dauphiné Libéré
1st Stage 2 Four Days of Dunkirk
1st Stage 4 Tirreno–Adriatico
1st Stage 2a (TTT) Tour de France
1st Omloop der Vlaamse Ardennen-Ichtegem
1st Grote Prijs Marcel Kint
1st Grand Prix de Saint-Tropez
1st Omloop van de Westkust
1st Flèche rebecquoise
2nd Tirreno–Adriatico
2nd Gent–Wevelgem
2nd Amstel Gold Race
2nd 1973 Liège–Bastogne–Liège
3rd Four Days of Dunkirk
3rd Paris–Brussels
3rd La Flèche Wallonne
3rd Paris–Tours
1974
1st La Flèche Wallonne
1st Grand Prix de Wallonie
1st GP Frans Verbeeck
1st Prologue Tour of Belgium
1st Stage 3 Tour de Luxembourg
1st Ronde van Limburg
1st Tour du Condroz
1st Grand Prix de Nice
1st Circuit du Tournaisis
1st Flèche rebecquoise
1st Omloop van Midden-Brabant
1st Grand Prix d'Orchies
2nd Tour of Flanders
2nd Brabantse Pijl
2nd Grand Prix de Cannes
2nd Tour de Luxembourg
2nd Kampioenschap van Vlaanderen
3rd E3 Harelbeke
3rd Frankfurt Grand Prix
3rd Championship of Zürich
3rd Grand Prix du Midi Libre
3rd Super Prestige Pernod
3rd GP Roeselare
1975
1st E3 Prijs Vlaanderen
1st GP Frans Verbeeck
1st Prologue A Ronde van Nederland
1st Overall Tour de Luxembourg

1st Stage 1 & 3

1st Hyon–Mons
2nd Tour of Flanders
2nd Gent–Wevelgem
2nd Omloop der Vlaamse Ardennen-Ichtegem
2nd La Flèche Wallonne
2nd Frankfurt Grand Prix
2nd Tour of the Netherlands
2nd GP Roeselare
2nd Omloop van Midden-Brabant
2nd Flèche rebecquoise
3rd Tour Belgium
3rd Grand Prix Pino Cerami
1976
1st GP Frans Verbeeck
1st 1976 Scheldeprijs
1st Grote Prijs Jef Scherens
1st Tour du Haut-Var
1st Overall Tour de Luxembourg

1st Stages 1 and 2

1st Grand Prix de Monaco
1st Stage 3 Tour Méditerranéen
1st Grand Prix d'Antibes
1st Grand Prix de Saint-Tropez
1st Brussels–Biévène
1st Omloop van Midden-Brabant
2nd La Flèche Wallonne
2nd Grand Prix Pino Cerami
2nd Frankfurt Grand Prix
2nd Coppa Agostoni
3rd Brabantse Pijl
3rd Gent–Wevelgem
3rd Liège–Bastogne–Liège
3rd Grand Prix de Wallonie
1977
1st Brabantse Pijl
1st Druivenkoers Overijse
1st GP Stad Vilvoorde
1st Circuit de Wallonie
1st Omloop van West-Brabant
3rd Frankfurt Grand Prix
