= Walter Planckaert =

Belgian cyclist

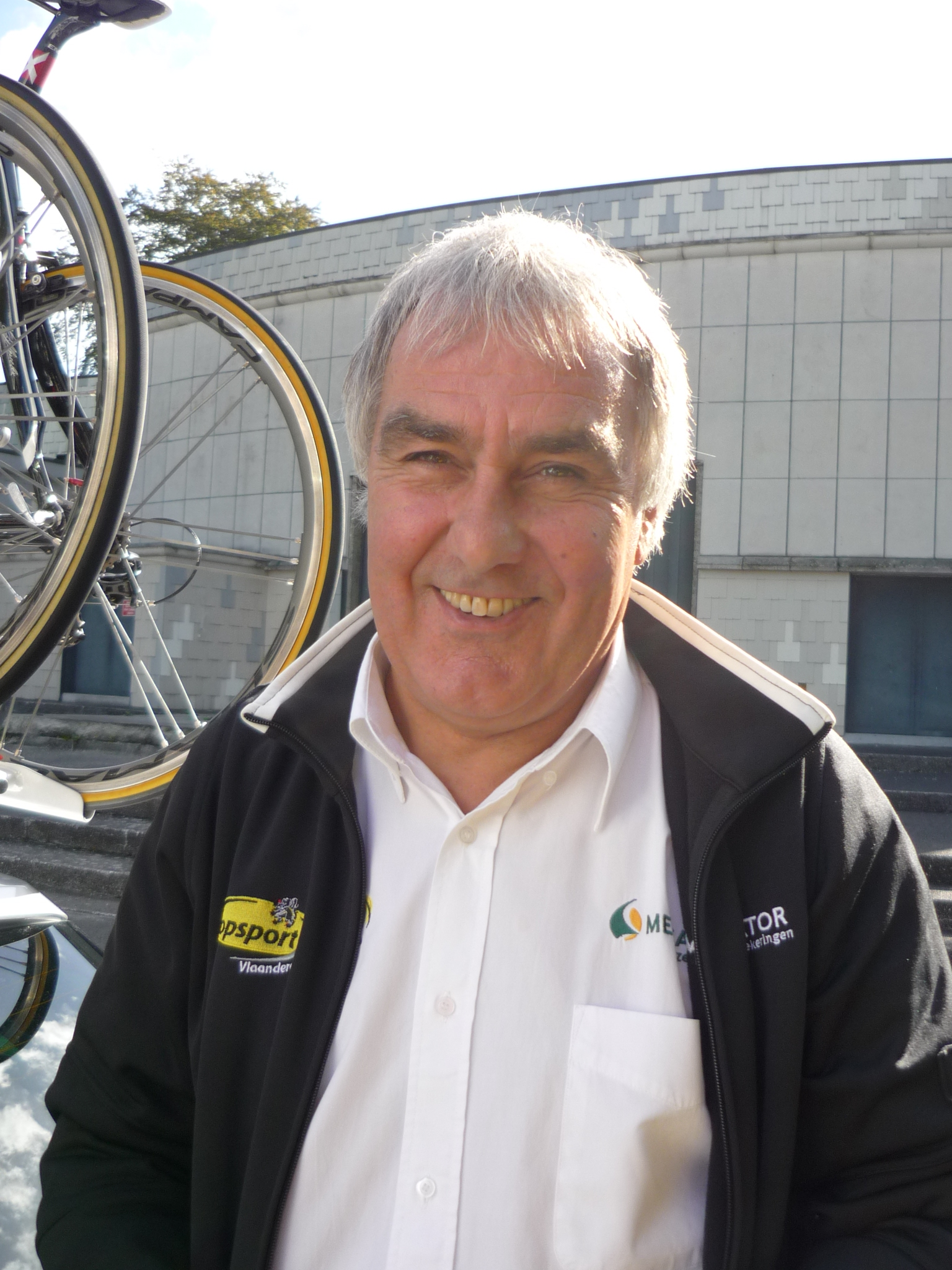
- Planckaert in 2011

Personal information
- Full name: Walter Planckaert
- Born: 8 April 1948 (age 78) Nevele, Belgium

Cycling career
- Sport: Cycling
- Current team: Retired
- Discipline: Road
- Role: Rider

Professional teams
- 1970: Geens-Watney
- 1971: Goldor
- 1972: Watney–Avia
- 1973–1974: Watney–Maes
- 1975: Maes–Watney
- 1976: Maes–Rokado
- 1977: Maes–Miniflat
- 1978: C&A
- 1979: Miniflat–VDB
- 1980: Miniflat–Galli
- 1981: Wickes–Splendor-Europ Decor
- 1982: Wickes–Splendor
- 1983: Splendor–Euroshop
- 1984–1985: Panasonic

Managerial teams
- 1986–1992: Panasonic
- 1993–1994: Novemail–Histor
- 1997–2000: Palmans–Ideal
- 2001–2002: Lotto–Adecco
- 2004-: Chocolade Jacques

Major wins
- Tour of Flanders (1976); Amstel Gold Race (1972); E3 Prijs Vlaanderen (1976); Tour de France 1 stage (1978)

Walter Planckaert (born 8 April 1948) is a Belgian former professional road racing cyclist. He is the younger brother of Willy Planckaert, the older brother of Eddy Planckaert, and the uncle of Jo Planckaert. He had 74 victories in his professional career. After retiring from riding, he commenced a long career in team management, working for the Panasonic, Novemail–Histor, Palmans, Lotto–Adecco and Chocolade Jacques teams.

== Major results ==
1972
Amstel Gold Race
1973
Kuurne–Brussels–Kuurne
1976
Tour of Flanders
E3 Prijs Vlaanderen
1977
Tour of Belgium
Dwars door Vlaanderen
1978
Tour de France:

Winner stage 1B

1979
Kuurne–Brussels–Kuurne
1984
Dwars door Vlaanderen

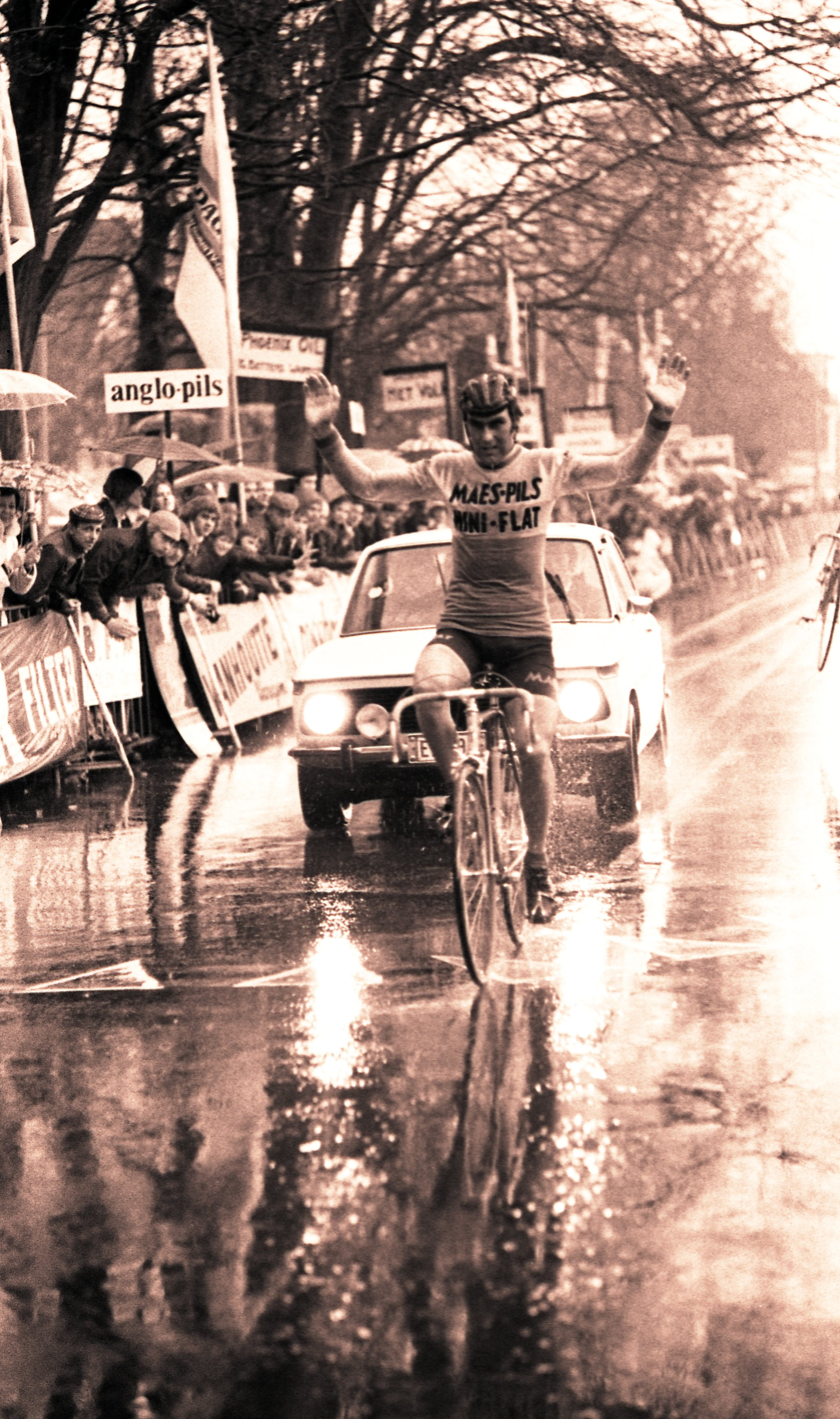
Walter Planckaert arrives first during Dwars door Vlaanderen 1977 (Maurice Terryn, collection: KOERS. Museum of Cycle Racing)
