= Roger Swerts =

Belgian cyclist (born 1942)

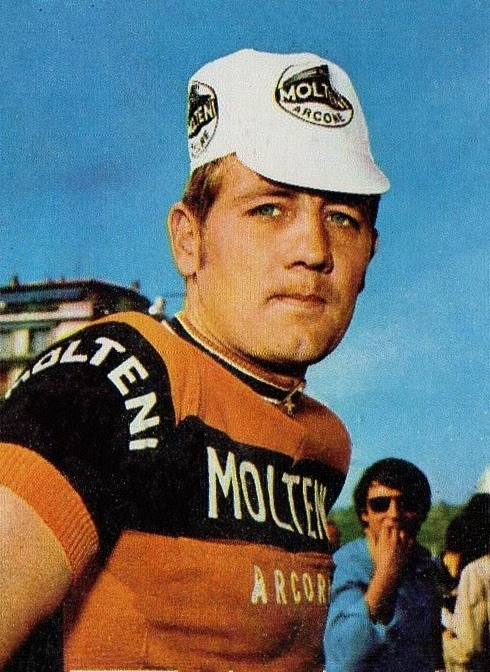
- Swerts c. 1973

Personal information
- Full name: Roger Swerts
- Born: 28 December 1942 (age 83) Heusden-Zolder, Belgium
- Height: 180 cm (5 ft 11 in)
- Weight: 75 kg (165 lb)

Cycling career
- Sport: Cycling
- Current team: Retired
- Discipline: Road
- Role: Rider

Professional teams
- 1965–1967: Mercier-BP-Hutchinson
- 1968–1970: Faema
- 1971–1973: Molteni
- 1974–1975: IJsboerke–Colner
- 1976: Molteni–Campagnolo
- 1977: Fiat
- 1978: Old Lord's–Splendor–K.S.B.

Major wins
- Grand Tours Tour de France 4 TTT stages (1969–1972) Giro d'Italia 1 individual stage (1972) 1 TTT stage (1973) Vuelta a España 5 individual stages (1973, 1974, 1975) 1 TTT stage (1973) One-day races and Classics National Road Race Championship (1974) Gent–Wevelgem (1972)
Medal record
Men's road bicycle racing
Representing Belgium
World Championships
Bronze medal – third place	1965 San Sebastián	Road race

Roger Swerts (born 28 December 1942) is a Belgian former road bicycle racer. As an amateur he placed 18th in the individual road race at the 1964 Summer Olympics and won a bronze medal at the 1965 UCI Road World Championships. He turned professional later in 1965.

== Major results ==
1962
2nd Overall Tour de Pologne

1st Stage 5

1964
1st Stage 10 Tour de l'Avenir
1965
3rd Road race, UCI Road World Championships
3rd Grand Prix de Fourmies
4th Grand Prix d'Isbergues
7th Overall Course de la Paix
1966
1st Stage 2b (TTT) Tour of Belgium
4th Harelbeke–Antwerp–Harelbeke
5th Road race, National Road Championships
5th La Flèche Wallonne
6th Grand Prix d'Isbergues
10th Liège–Bastogne–Liège
1967
4th Overall Four Days of Dunkirk
1968
1st Grand Prix de Monaco
1st Stage 6a Volta a Catalunya
4th Brabantse Pijl
4th Heist-op-den-Berg
5th Sassari-Cagliari
6th Overall Tour of Belgium
8th Giro del Veneto
8th Omloop der Zennevallei
1969
1st Züri–Metzgete
1st Stage 1b (TTT) Tour de France
5th Road race, UCI Road World Championships
6th Overall Giro di Sardegna
6th Liège–Bastogne–Liège
6th Trofeo Laigueglia
6th Omloop van de Fruitstreek
7th Druivenkoers Overijse
1970
1st Stage 3a (TTT) Tour de France
1971
1st Nationale Sluitingsprijs
1st Prologue (TTT) Tour de France
2nd Brussels–Ingooige
4th Züri–Metzgete
6th Paris–Tours
8th Amstel Gold Race
8th Brabantse Pijl
10th Road race, UCI Road World Championships
1972
1st Overall Tour of Belgium

1st Stages 4 & 5b (ITT)

1st Gent–Wevelgem
1st Grand Prix des Nations
1st Trofeo Baracchi (with Eddy Merckx)
1st Stage 12b (ITT) Giro d'Italia
1st Stage 1a (ITT) Escalada a Montjuïc
1st Stage 3b (TTT) Tour de France
2nd Gran Premio di Lugano
3rd Brabantse Pijl
4th Liège–Bastogne–Liège
6th Tour of Flanders
9th Tour du Condroz
10th La Flèche Wallonne
10th Züri–Metzgete
1973
1st Druivenkoers Overijse
1st Stage 2 Tour of Belgium
Giro d'Italia

1st Prologue (TTT)
Held after Prologue

3rd Gran Premio Città di Camaiore
4th Overall Tirreno–Adriatico

1st Stage 5b (ITT)

7th Overall Setmana Catalana de Ciclisme
9th Road race, National Road Championships
9th Overall Vuelta a España

1st Stages 6a & 6b (TTT)

1974
1st Road race, National Road Championships
1st Overall Tour of Belgium
7th Brabantse Pijl
8th Ronde van Limburg
9th Circuit des Onze Villes
10th Overall Vuelta a España

1st Prologue, Stages 8a & 12
Held after Prologue & Stage 1

10th Gent–Wevelgem
1975
1st Heist-op-den-Berg
Vuelta a España

1st Prologue
Held after Prologue & Stage 1

3rd Dwars door België
5th Road race, National Road Championships
5th Overall Tour of Belgium
7th Paris–Roubaix
8th Nationale Sluitingsprijs
9th Gent–Wevelgem
9th Omloop van Oost-Vlaanderen
1976
7th Amstel Gold Race
8th Brabantse Pijl
1977
8th Overall Tour of Belgium

=== Grand Tour general classification results timeline ===
Grand Tour	1965	1966	1967	1968	1969	1970	1971	1972	1973	1974	1975	1976	1977	1978
Vuelta a España	—	—	—	—	—	—	—	—	9	10	29	—	—	—
Giro d'Italia	—	—	—	25	—	53	21	16	20	—	—	—	—	—
Tour de France	41	63	54	—	44	24	35	14	—	—	—	—	—	—

=== Classics results timeline ===
Monuments results timeline
Monument	1965	1966	1967	1968	1969	1970	1971	1972	1973	1974	1975	1976	1977	1978
Milan–San Remo	—	—	—	—	—	143	—	30	34	26	35	55	—	—
Tour of Flanders	—	—	14	—	—	—	61	6	—	14	18	—	—	—
Paris–Roubaix	—	—	15	29	—	—	—	12	—	—	7	17	—	—
Liège–Bastogne–Liège	—	6	19	—	6	—	—	4	—	—	—	—	—	45
Giro di Lombardia	Did not contest during career													

=== Major championship results timeline ===
	1965	1966	1967	1968	1969	1970	1971	1972	1973	1974	1975	1976	1977	1978
World Championships	3	—	—	—	5	—	10	DNF	—	DNF	—	—	—	—
National Championships	37	5	14	—	27	18	11	16	9	1	5	22	—	—

Legend
—	Did not compete
DNF	Did not finish
