= Walter Godefroot =

Belgian cyclist (1943–2025)

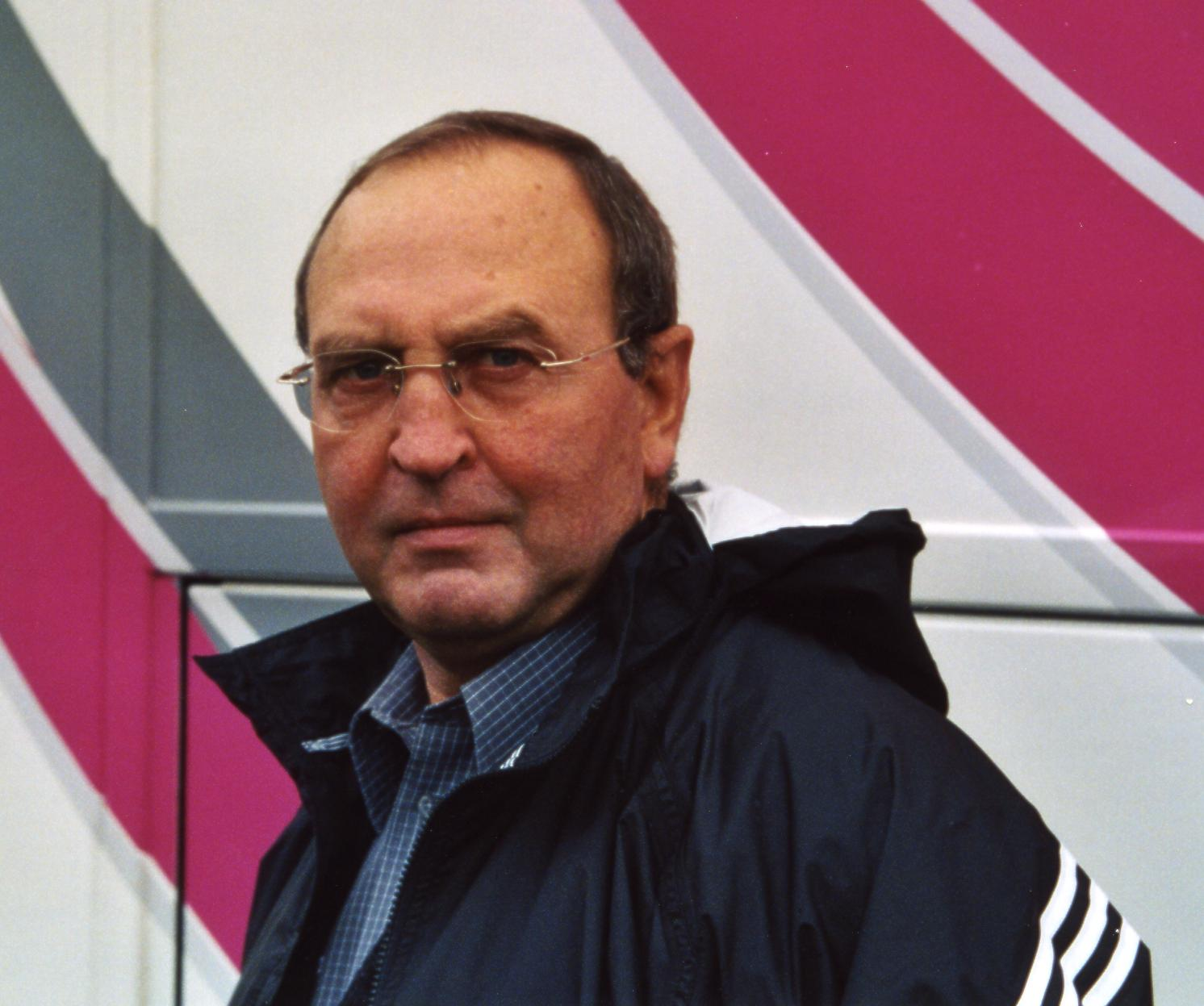
- Godefroot at the 1997 Paris–Nice

Personal information
- Nickname: The Bulldog of Flanders
- Born: 2 July 1943 Ghent, German-occupied Belgium
- Died: 1 September 2025 (aged 82)

Cycling career
- Sport: Cycling
- Discipline: Road
- Rider type: Classics specialist

Professional teams
- 1965–1966: Wiel's–Groene Leeuw
- 1967–1969: Flandria–De Clerck
- 1970: Salvarani
- 1971–1972: Peugeot–BP–Michelin
- 1973–1975: Flandria–Carpenter–Shimano
- 1976–1979: IJsboerke–Colnago

Managerial teams
- 1991–2005: Team Telekom
- 2006: Astana–Würth
- 2007: Astana

Major wins
- Grand Tours Tour de France Points classification (1970) 10 individual stages (1967, 1968, 1970–1973, 1975) Giro d'Italia 1 individual stage (1970) Vuelta a España 2 individual stages (1971) One-day races and Classics National Road Race Championships (1965, 1972) Tour of Flanders (1968, 1978) Liège–Bastogne–Liège (1967) Paris–Roubaix (1969) Gent–Wevelgem (1968)
Medal record
Representing Belgium
Men's road bicycle racing
Olympic Games
Bronze medal – third place	1964 Tokyo	Individual road race

Walter Godefroot (2 July 1943 – 1 September 2025) was a Belgian professional road bicycle racer and directeur sportif of Team Telekom, later known as T-Mobile Team.

== Biography ==
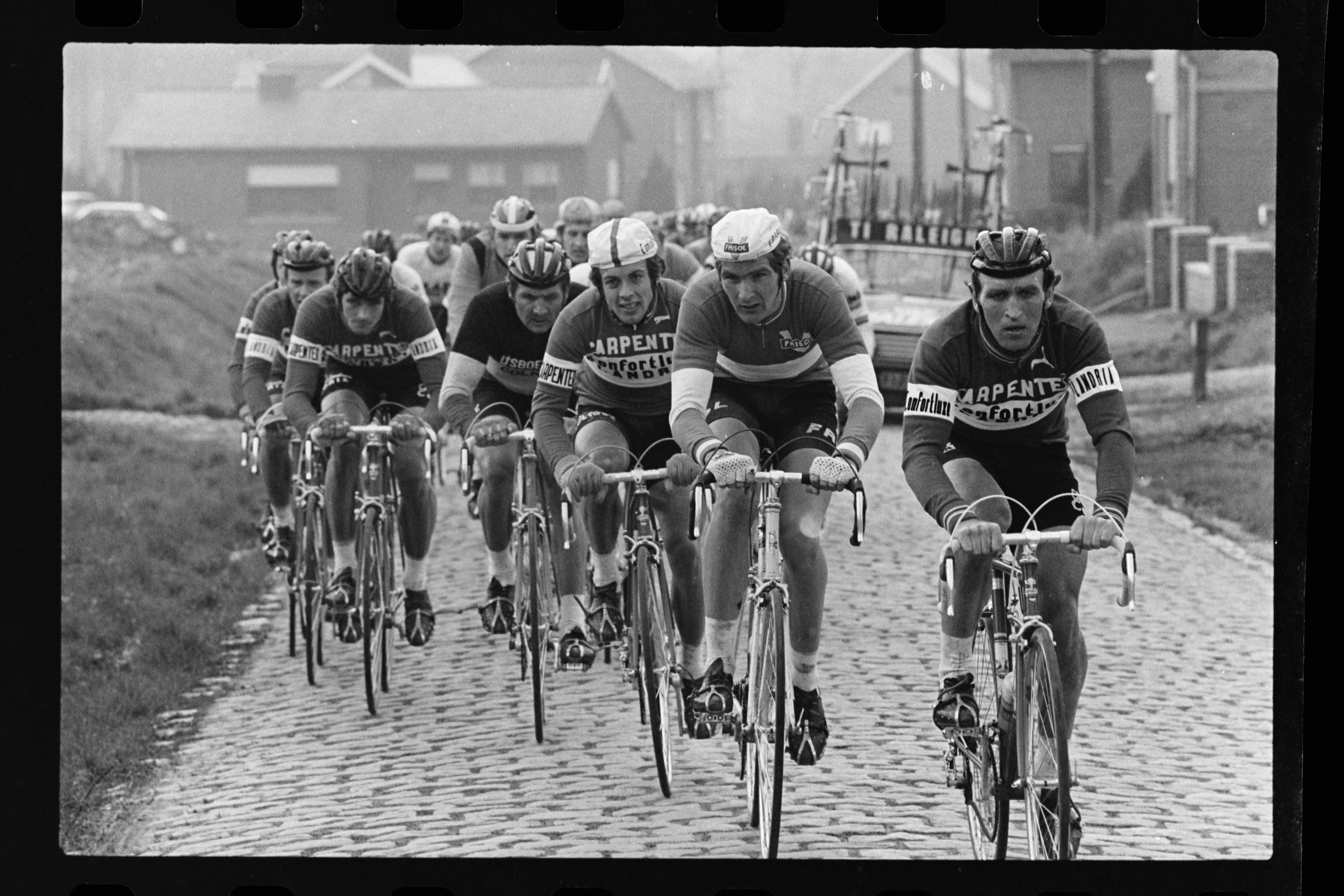
The peloton led by Godefroot in Dwars door België, 1975

As an amateur cyclist, Godefroot won the bronze medal in the individual road race of the 1964 Summer Olympics after his young compatriot Eddy Merckx was caught in the final. Both men turned professional in 1965, and Godefroot was presented as Merckx's bane in his early days, winning several races ahead of him: the Belgian championship in 1965, Liège–Bastogne–Liège (1967) and Paris–Roubaix (1969).

However, Godefroot eventually lacked Merckx's abilities in stage races and focused on the individual stages in the grand tours. He won ten stages in the Tour de France, including the stage on the Champs-Élysées in 1975, where the Tour finished for the first time, and the green jersey in the 1970 Tour de France, one stage in the 1970 Giro d'Italia and two stages in the 1971 Vuelta a España.

Being a specialist in one-day classic cycle races, he won another Belgian champion title in 1972, two Tours of Flanders at ten-year intervals in 1968 and 1978, two Bordeaux–Paris in 1969 and 1976 and had numerous runner-ups in other classics.

Remarkably, Godefroot informed the Tour de Flandres organization about the existence of the Koppenberg. Since 1976, the hill has been part of the race course.

At the end of his career, following the classics campaign in April 1977, he tested positive for a doping product along with several other top riders.

In 1981, Godefroot and his wife established a cycling shop in Deurle, which remains operational as of September 2025.

He managed the Capri-Sonne-Koga Miyata, T-Mobile, and Astana teams. He was notably the sports director of Bjarne Riis, Jan Ullrich and Erik Zabel during the victorious Tour de France editions in 1996 and 1997. However, Riis and Zabel later admitted they used EPO in the 1996 Tour de France.

Godefroot stepped down as team manager before the 2006 season and was replaced by Olaf Ludwig. After the exclusion of Astana–Würth from the 2006 Tour de France, Godefroot returned to the peloton when he became manager of Astana. His contract was not renewed when it ran out in July 2007. He then withdrew from professional cycling.

In his racing days, he was called 'The Bulldog of Flanders'.

Godefroot died on 1 September 2025, at the age of 82. He had been diagnosed with Parkinson's disease a few years before.

== Major results ==
=== Road ===
1964
1st Stage 2 Tour de Berlin
3rd Road race, Olympic Games
3rd Overall Tour de Tunisie

1st Stages 1, 4 & 8

1965
1st Road race, National Championships
1st Omloop van het Zuidwesten
3rd Tielt–Antwerpen–Tielt
4th GP du Tournaisis
7th Grand Prix d'Isbergues
8th Overall Tour du Nord
10th Omloop van Oost-Vlaanderen
1966
1st Dwars door België
1st Grote Prijs Beeckman-De Caluwé
1st Maaslandse Pijl
Volta a Catalunya

1st Stages 1a, 1b, 3, 6a & 8

1st Stage 3 Tour of Belgium
1st Points classification, Four Days of Dunkirk
2nd Omloop Het Volk
2nd Rund um den Henninger Turm
2nd Grand Prix d'Isbergues
2nd Bruxelles–Meulebeke
2nd Circuit des Onze Villes
4th Liège–Bastogne–Liège
4th Paris–Brussels
4th Grote Prijs Jef Scherens
6th Gent–Wevelgem
7th Overall Grand Prix du Midi Libre

1st Stage 1

1967
1st Liège–Bastogne–Liège
1st Nokere Koerse
1st Maaslandse Pijl
1st Memorial Fred De Bruyne
1st Porto–Lisboa
Tour de France

1st Stage 1b
Held after Stage 1b

1st Stage 7a Tour de Suisse
1st Stage 1 Tour de Romandie
2nd Gullegem Koerse
2nd Bruxelles–Meulebeke
2nd Omloop van de Vlasstreek
4th Harelbeke–Antwerp–Harelbeke
5th La Flèche Wallonne
6th Dwars door België
7th Milan–San Remo
8th Grote Prijs Jef Scherens
9th Overall Paris–Nice
9th Kuurne–Brussels–Kuurne
1968
1st Tour of Flanders
1st Gent–Wevelgem
1st Dwars door België
Tour de France

1st Stages 3b & 9
Held after Stages 5a, 9 & 11–18

Paris–Nice

1st Stages 2 & 6

1st Stage 2 Tour de Suisse
2nd Liège–Bastogne–Liège
2nd Paris–Tours
3rd Paris–Roubaix
3rd Omloop van de Vlasstreek
4th Omloop Het Volk
4th Bruxelles–Meulebeke
4th Baden-Baden (with Herman Vanspringel)
6th Overall Four Days of Dunkirk
8th Overall Vuelta a Andalucía

1st Stages 3 & 8

9th Milan–San Remo
9th La Flèche Wallonne
1969
1st Paris–Roubaix
1st Scheldeprijs
1st Omloop van de Fruitstreek
1st Heusden Koers
1st GP du canton d'Argovie
1st Critérium des As
1st Bordeaux–Paris
1st Stage 6b Critérium du Dauphiné Libéré
1st Stage 3a Tour de Suisse
2nd Road race, National Championships
3rd GP Union Dortmund
4th La Flèche Wallonne
5th Milan–San Remo
5th Dwars door België
5th Bruxelles–Meulebeke
10th Rund um den Henninger Turm
1970
1st Züri-Metzgete
1st Circuit de l'Aulne
1st Giro della Provincia di Reggio Calabria
1st Grand Prix d'Aix-en-Provence
Tour de France

1st Points classification
1st Stages 4 & 5a

1st Stage 8 Giro d'Italia
2nd Overall Tour of Belgium

1st Stage 3a

2nd Tour of Flanders
3rd Gent–Wevelgem
4th Coppa Placci
4th Brussels–Ingooigem
5th Milan–San Remo
5th Paris–Roubaix
7th Road race, UCI World Championships
9th Rund um den Henninger Turm
10th GP du Tournaisis
1971
1st Textielprijs Vichte
Tour de France

1st Stage 9
Held after Stages 1b & 9

Vuelta a España

1st Stages 7 & 8

1st Stage 1 Setmana Catalana de Ciclisme
2nd Grand Prix de Wallonie
4th E3 Prijs Vlaanderen
4th Paris–Tours
5th La Flèche Wallonne
9th Circuit de l'Aulne
1972
1st Road race, National Championships
1st Stage 5a Tour de France
2nd Circuit de l'Aulne
3rd E3 Prijs Vlaanderen
3rd Nationale Sluitingsprijs
3rd Kampioenschap van Vlaanderen
3rd Critérium des As
5th Circuit des Onze Villes
6th Scheldeprijs
7th Omloop Het Volk
1973
1st Omloop van Oost-Vlaanderen
1st Omloop der drie Provinciën
1st GP Briek Schotte
1st Circuit du Brabant central
Tour de France

1st Stages 5 & 16a

1st Stage 4a Paris–Nice
1st Stage 5 Vuelta a Andalucía
2nd Paris–Roubaix
2nd Flèche Halloise
3rd Liège–Bastogne–Liège
3rd Grand Prix de Wallonie
3rd Bordeaux–Paris
4th Gent–Wevelgem
5th Overall Tour of Belgium

1st Stage 1

5th Omloop Het Volk
6th Tour of Flanders
7th La Flèche Wallonne
7th Paris–Tours
8th Rund um den Henninger Turm
9th Amstel Gold Race
10th Milan–San Remo
10th Circuit des Onze Villes
1974
1st Overall Four Days of Dunkirk

1st Stage 3a

1st Rund um den Henninger Turm
1st Züri-Metzgete
~~3rd Tour of Flanders~~
3rd Amstel Gold Race
3rd Circuit des Onze Villes
4th E3 Prijs Vlaanderen
7th Milan–San Remo
8th Gent–Wevelgem
10th Dwars door België
1975
1st Stage 22 Tour de France
2nd Omloop van de Westkust
3rd Liège–Bastogne–Liège
3rd Rund um den Henninger Turm
3rd Ronde van Limburg
3rd Grote Prijs Marcel Kint
4th Dwars door België
8th Paris–Roubaix
1976
1st Bordeaux–Paris
1st Prologue (TTT) Tour de Luxembourg
2nd E3 Prijs Vlaanderen
2nd Maël-Pestivien
3rd Züri-Metzgete
3rd Tour du Condroz
4th Rund um den Henninger Turm
5th Paris–Roubaix
5th La Flèche Wallonne
5th Grand Prix de Wallonie
6th Paris–Brussels
6th Omloop van het Leiedal
7th Circuit de l'Aulne
8th Overall Tour of Belgium

1st Stage 2

8th Tour of Flanders
8th Herinneringsprijs Dokter Tistaert – Prijs Groot-Zottegem
10th Milan–San Remo
10th Grand Prix Pino Cerami
10th Grand Prix de Monaco
1977
1st Heusden Koers
1st Stage 3 Four Days of Dunkirk
2nd Tour of Flanders
2nd Milano–Torino
2nd Bordeaux–Paris
3rd Züri-Metzgete
4th Gent–Wevelgem
5th Omloop van het Zuidwesten
6th Omloop Het Volk
6th Omloop der Beide Vlaanderen
6th Rund um den Henninger Turm
8th Amstel Gold Race
10th Road race, UCI World Championships
1978
1st Tour of Flanders
2nd Herinneringsprijs Dokter Tistaert – Prijs Groot-Zottegem
2nd Grand Prix d'Aix-en-Provence
8th Dwars door België
9th E3 Prijs Vlaanderen
9th Critérium des As
10th Omloop Het Volk
1979
1st Circuit des Frontières
1st Ruddervoorde Koerse
1st Stage 1a (TTT) Tour de Belgium
2nd Circuit de l'Aulne
2nd Omloop Mandel-Leie-Schelde
3rd Memorial Fred De Bruyne
6th Rund um den Henninger Turm
8th Tour of Flanders
8th Dwars door België
9th Druivenkoers Overijse

==== Grand Tour general classification results timeline ====
Grand Tour	1965	1966	1967	1968	1969	1970	1971	1972	1973	1974	1975	1976	1977	1978	1979
Vuelta a España	—	—	—	—	—	—	30	—	—	—	—	—	—	—	—
Giro d'Italia	—	—	—	—	—	55	—	—	—	—	—	—	—	—	—
Tour de France	—	—	60	20	—	29	DNF	44	65	—	51	—	—	—	—

==== Monuments results timeline ====
Monument	1965	1966	1967	1968	1969	1970	1971	1972	1973	1974	1975	1976	1977	1978	1979
Milan–San Remo	—	—	7	9	5	5	21	—	10	7	30	10	16	—	—
Tour of Flanders	—	27	15	1	13	2	19	—	6	~~3~~	14	8	2	1	8
Paris–Roubaix	—	20	34	3	1	5	13	—	2	18	8	5	15	11	13
Liège–Bastogne–Liège	—	4	1	2	18	—	—	—	3	14	3	12	—	—	30
Giro di Lombardia	—	—	—	14	—	—	—	—	—	22	—	—	—	—	—

==== Major championships results timeline ====
	1965	1966	1967	1968	1969	1970	1971	1972	1973	1974	1975	1976	1977	1978	1979
World Championships	20	—	—	DNF	19	7	41	DNF	11	—	—	19	10	22	DNF
National Championships	1	13	27	17	2	6	—	1	6	—	8	11	11	16	—

Legend
—	Did not compete
DNF	Did not finish

Criteriums
1965
1st Critérium de Libramont
1967
1st Circuit de l'Armorique à Ploudalmézeau
1st Circuit du Maasland
1970
1st Critérium de Boulogne-sur-Mer
1975
1st Critérium De Panne

=== Track ===
1966
1st Six Days of Madrid (with Emiel Severeyns)
1971
3rd Six Days of Antwerp
1972
3rd Six Days of Ghent (with Graeme Gilmore)
1973
2nd Madison, National Championships (with Norbert Seeuws)
3rd Six Days of Antwerp
1975
3rd Madison, National Championships (with Freddy Maertens)
