= 1971 Super Prestige Pernod =

European road cycling competition

- Thirteenth edition of the Super Prestige Pernod

Details
- Dates: March – October
- Location: Europe
- Races: 16

Champions
- Individual champion: Eddy Merckx (BEL) (Molteni)

The 1971 Super Prestige Pernod was the thirteenth edition of the Super Prestige Pernod, a season-long competition for road bicycle racing. It included sixteen races in Europe. Belgian Eddy Merckx of the Molteni team won the overall title.

== Races ==
1971 Super Prestige Pernod races
Date	Race	Country	Winner	Team	Report
10–17 March	Paris–Nice	France	Eddy Merckx (BEL)	Molteni	Report
19 March	Milan–San Remo	Italy	Eddy Merckx (BEL)	Molteni	Report
4 April	Tour of Flanders	Belgium	Evert Dolman (NED)	Flandria–Mars	Report
18 April	Paris–Roubaix	France	Roger Rosiers (BEL)	Bic	Report
25 April	Liège–Bastogne–Liège	Belgium	Eddy Merckx (BEL)	Molteni	Report
29 April – 16 May	Vuelta a España	Spain	Ferdinand Bracke (BEL)	Peugeot–BP–Michelin	Report
1 May	Rund um den Henninger Turm	West Germany	Eddy Merckx (BEL)	Molteni	Report
4–9 May	Four Days of Dunkirk	France	Roger De Vlaeminck (BEL)	Flandria–Mars	Report
18–23 May	Critérium du Dauphiné Libéré	France	Eddy Merckx (BEL)	Molteni	Report
20 May – 10 June	Giro d'Italia	Italy	Gösta Pettersson (SWE)	Ferretti	Report
3–6 June	Grand Prix du Midi Libre	France	Eddy Merckx (BEL)	Molteni	Report
26 June – 18 July	Tour de France	France	Eddy Merckx (BEL)	Molteni	Report
5 September	UCI Road World Championships	Switzerland	Eddy Merckx (BEL)	Molteni	Report
3 October	Paris–Tours	France	Rik van Linden (BEL)	Hertekamp–Magniflex	Report
9 October	Giro di Lombardia	Italy	Eddy Merckx (BEL)	Molteni	Report
24 October	Grand Prix des Nations	France	Luis Ocaña (ESP)	Bic	Report

== Final standings ==
1971 Super Prestige Pernod final standings (1–10)
Rank	Cyclist	Team	Points
1	Eddy Merckx (BEL)	Molteni	571
2	Luis Ocaña (ESP)	Bic	150
3	Joop Zoetemelk (NED)	Flandria–Mars	140
3	Gösta Pettersson (SWE)	Ferretti	140
5	Cyrille Guimard (FRA)	Fagor–Mercier–Hutchinson	118
6	Felice Gimondi (ITA)	Salvarani	103
7	Herman van Springel (BEL)	Molteni	90
8	Ferdinand Bracke (BEL)	Peugeot–BP–Michelin	75
8	Marino Basso (ITA)	Molteni	75
10	Frans Verbeeck (BEL)	Watney–Avia	73
