= 1975 Paris–Roubaix =

Race details
- Dates: 13 April 1975
- Stages: 1
- Distance: 277.5 km (172.4 mi)
- Winning time: 6h 52' 04"

Results
	Winner	Roger De Vlaeminck (BEL)	(Brooklyn)
	Second	Eddy Merckx (BEL)	(Molteni–RYC)
	Third	André Dierickx (BEL)	(Rokado)

The 1975 Paris–Roubaix was the 73rd edition of the Paris–Roubaix cycle race and was held on 13 April 1975. The race started in Compiègne and finished in Roubaix. The race was won by Roger De Vlaeminck of the Brooklyn team.

== General classification ==
Final general classification

Rank	Rider	Team	Time
1	Roger De Vlaeminck (BEL)	Brooklyn	6h 52' 04"
2	Eddy Merckx (BEL)	Molteni–RYC	+ 0"
3	André Dierickx (BEL)	Rokado	+ 0"
4	Marc Demeyer (BEL)	Carpenter–Confortluxe–Flandria	+ 0"
5	Francesco Moser (ITA)	Filotex	+ 2' 41"
6	Freddy Maertens (BEL)	Carpenter–Confortluxe–Flandria	+ 2' 41"
7	Roger Swerts (BEL)	IJsboerke–Colner	+ 5' 13"
8	Walter Godefroot (BEL)	Carpenter–Confortluxe–Flandria	+ 7' 44"
9	Guido Van Sweevelt (BEL)	Maes Pils–Watney	+ 9' 19"
10	Gerben Karstens (NED)	Gitane–Campagnolo	+ 10' 33"
