= 1974 Milan–San Remo =

Race details
- Dates: 18 March 1974
- Stages: 1
- Distance: 288 km (179 mi)
- Winning time: 6h 46' 16"

Results
| | Winner | Felice Gimondi (ITA) | (Bianchi–Campagnolo) |
| | Second | Eric Leman (BEL) | (MIC–Ludo–de Gribaldy) |
| | Third | Roger De Vlaeminck (BEL) | (Brooklyn) |

The 1974 Milan–San Remo was the 65th edition of the Milan–San Remo cycle race and was held on 18 March 1974. The race started in Milan and finished in San Remo. The race was won by Felice Gimondi of the Bianchi team.

== General classification ==
Final general classification

| Rank | Rider | Team | Time |
|---|---|---|---|
| 1 | Felice Gimondi (ITA) | Bianchi–Campagnolo | 6h 46' 16" |
| 2 | Eric Leman (BEL) | MIC–Ludo–de Gribaldy | + 1' 53" |
| 3 | Roger De Vlaeminck (BEL) | Brooklyn | + 1' 54" |
| 4 | Franco Bitossi (ITA) | Scic | + 1' 55" |
| 5 | Enrico Paolini (ITA) | Scic | + 2' 05" |
| 6 | Marino Basso (ITA) | Bianchi–Campagnolo | + 2' 05" |
| 7 | Walter Godefroot (BEL) | Carpenter–Confortluxe–Flandria | + 2' 05" |
| 8 | Frans Verbeeck (BEL) | Watney–Maes Pils | + 2' 05" |
| 9 | Freddy Maertens (BEL) | Carpenter–Confortluxe–Flandria | + 2' 05" |
| 10 | Jaime Huélamo (ESP) | Kas–Kaskol | + 2' 05" |
