= 1970 Milan–San Remo =

Race details
- Dates: 19 March 1970
- Stages: 1
- Distance: 288 km (179 mi)
- Winning time: 6h 32' 56"

Results
	Winner	Michele Dancelli (ITA)	(Molteni)
	Second	Gerben Karstens (NED)	(Peugeot–BP–Michelin)
	Third	Eric Leman (BEL)	(Flandria–Mars)

The 1970 Milan–San Remo was the 61st edition of the Milan–San Remo cycle race and was held on 19 March 1970. The race started in Milan and finished in San Remo. The race was won by Michele Dancelli of the Molteni team.

== General classification ==
Final general classification

Rank	Rider	Team	Time
1	Michele Dancelli (ITA)	Molteni	6h 32' 56"
2	Gerben Karstens (NED)	Peugeot–BP–Michelin	+ 1' 39"
3	Eric Leman (BEL)	Flandria–Mars	+ 1' 39"
4	Italo Zilioli (ITA)	Faemino–Faema	+ 1' 39"
5	Walter Godefroot (BEL)	Salvarani	+ 1' 39"
6	Rolf Wolfshohl (FRG)	Fagor–Mercier–Hutchinson	+ 1' 39"
7	Mauro Simonetti (ITA)	Ferretti	+ 1' 43"
8	Eddy Merckx (BEL)	Faemino–Faema	+ 1' 56"
9	Frans Verbeeck (BEL)	Geens–Watney	+ 1' 56"
10	Guido Reybrouck (BEL)	Germanvox–Wega	+ 1' 56"
