= 1965 UCI Road World Championships – Men's road race =

Men's Individual Road Race
1965 UCI Road World Championships
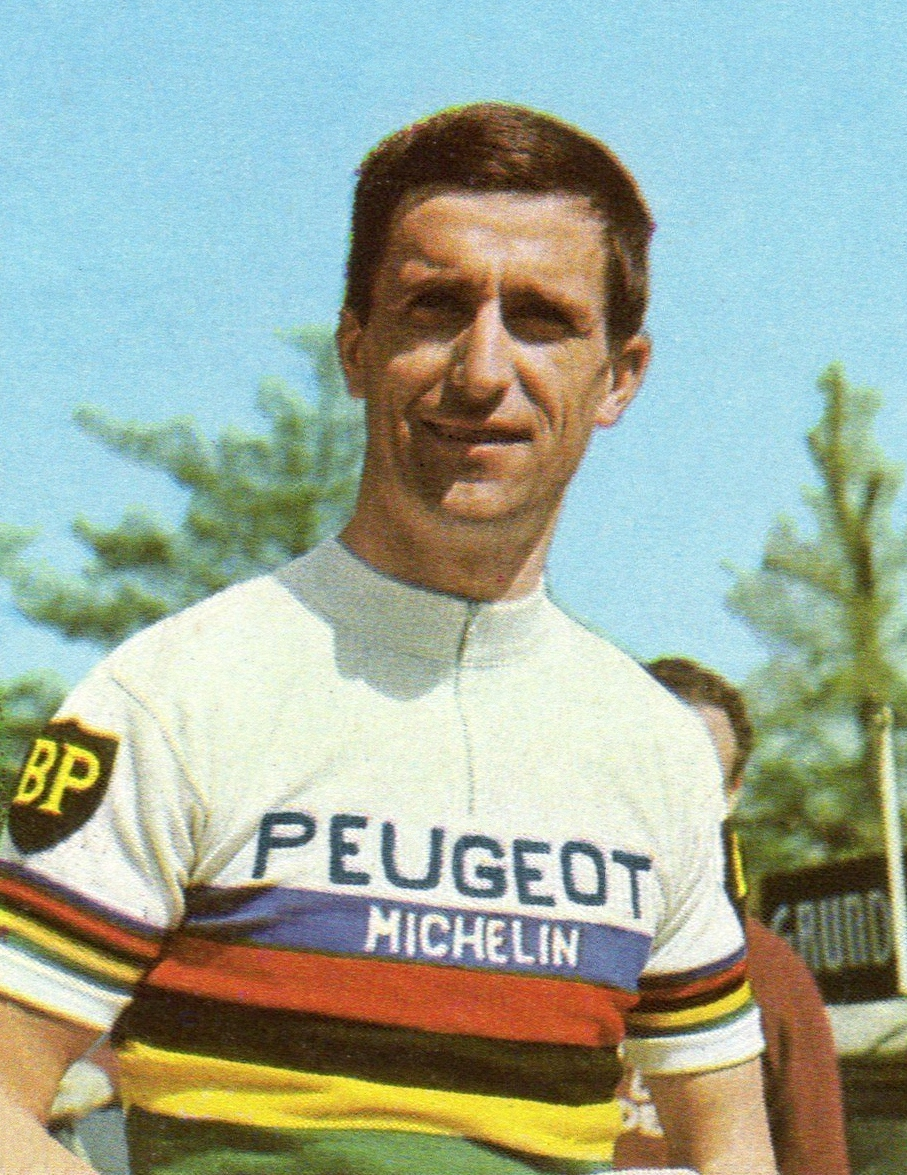
- Later picture of Tom Simpson in the rainbow jersey

Race details
- Dates: 5 September 1965
- Stages: 1
- Distance: 267.4 km (166.2 mi)
- Winning time: 6h 39' 19"

Medalists
	Gold	Tom Simpson (GBR)	(Great Britain)
	Silver	Rudi Altig (GER)	(Germany)
	Bronze	Roger Swerts (BEL)	(Belgium)

The Men's Individual Road Race of the 1965 UCI Road World Championships cycling event took place on 5 September in San Sebastián, Basque Country, Spain.

The race was won by Great Britain's Tom Simpson, outsprinting Germany's Rudi Altig after the two had broken away with 40 km (24.9 mi) to go.

== Final classification ==
Rank	Rider	Country	Time
1	Tom Simpson	Great Britain	6h 39' 19"
1	Rudi Altig	Germany	s.t.
1	Roger Swerts	Belgium	+ 3'40"
4	Peter Post	Netherlands	s.t.
5	Karl-Heinz Kunde	Germany	s.t.
6	René Binggeli	Switzerland	+ 3' 50"
7	Arie Den Hartog	Netherlands	s.t.
8	Franco Balmamion	Italy	s.t.
9	Francisco Gabica	Spain	s.t.
10	Jean Stablinski	France	+ 4' 58"
11	Antonio Gómez del Moral	Spain	+ 6' 06"
12	Bruno Mealli	Italy	s.t.
13	Sebastián Elorza Uría	Spain	+ 7' 44"
14	Edward Sels	Belgium	+ 9'06"
15	Valentín Uriona	Spain	s.t.
16	Italo Zilioli	Italy	s.t.
17	Fernando Manzaneque	Spain	s.t.
18	Bernard Vandekerkhove	Belgium	s.t.
19	Barry Hoban	Great Britain	+ 9' 55"
20	Walter Godefroot	Belgium	+ 12' 56"
21	Hans Junkermann	Germany	s.t.
22	Joseph Groussard	France	s.t.
23	Willi Altig	Germany	s.t.
24	Winfried Bölke	Germany	s.t.
25	Joseph Huysmans	Belgium	s.t.
26	Franco Cribiori	Italy	s.t.
27	Michele Dancelli	Italy	s.t.
28	Rolf Maurer	Switzerland	s.t.
29	Eddy Merckx	Belgium	s.t.
30	João Roque	Portugal	s.t.
31	André Foucher	France	s.t.
32	Eddy Schutz	Luxembourg	s.t.
33	Ginés García Perán	Spain	s.t.
34	Adriano Passuello	Italy	s.t.
35	Alan Ramsbottom	Great Britain	s.t.
36	Gilbert Bellone	France	s.t.
37	André Zimmermann	France	s.t.
38	Werner Weber	Switzerland	s.t.
39	Cornelius Haast	Netherlands	s.t.
40	Gianni Motta	Italy	s.t.
41	Guido De Rosso	Italy	s.t.
42	Robert Hagmann	Switzerland	s.t.
43	Jan Janssen	Netherlands	s.t.
44	Jo de Roo	Netherlands	s.t.
45	Gerben Karstens	Netherlands	s.t.
46	Cornelis Lute	Netherlands	s.t.
47	Leonel Miranda	Portugal	+ 15' 33"
48	Luis Otaño	Spain	s.t.
49	Mário Pereira Da Silva	Portugal	+ 16' 00"
50	Dieter Wiedemann	Germany	s.t.
51	Keith Butler	Great Britain	s.t.
52	Peter Glemser	Germany	s.t.
53	Vin Denson	Great Britain	s.t.
54	Bill Lawrie	Australia	s.t.
55	Jos van der Vleuten	Netherlands	+ 28' 00"
56	João Alves Peixoto	Portugal	s.t.
