= 1973 Liège–Bastogne–Liège =

Race details
- Dates: 22 April 1973
- Stages: 1
- Distance: 236 km (147 mi)
- Winning time: 6h 13' 55"

Results
| | Winner | Eddy Merckx (BEL) | (Molteni) |
| | Second | Frans Verbeeck (BEL) | (Watney–Maes Pils) |
| | Third | Walter Godefroot (BEL) | (Flandria–Carpenter–Shimano) |

The 1973 Liège–Bastogne–Liège was the 59th edition of the Liège–Bastogne–Liège cycle race and was held on 22 April 1973. The race started and finished in Liège. The race was won by Eddy Merckx of the Molteni team.

== General classification ==
Final general classification

| Rank | Rider | Team | Time |
|---|---|---|---|
| 1 | Eddy Merckx (BEL) | Molteni | 6h 13' 55" |
| 2 | Frans Verbeeck (BEL) | Watney–Maes Pils | + 0" |
| 3 | Walter Godefroot (BEL) | Flandria–Carpenter–Shimano | + 0" |
| 4 | Raymond Poulidor (FRA) | Gan–Mercier–Hutchinson | + 0" |
| 5 | Régis Ovion (FRA) | Peugeot–BP–Michelin | + 0" |
| 6 | Bernard Thévenet (FRA) | Peugeot–BP–Michelin | + 0" |
| 7 | Leif Mortensen (DEN) | Bic | + 0" |
| 8 | Georges Pintens (BEL) | Rokado–De Gribaldy | + 0" |
| 9 | Joop Zoetemelk (NED) | Gitane–Frigécrème | + 0" |
| 10 | Victor Van Schil (BEL) | Molteni | + 0" |
