= 1978 Tour of Flanders =

62nd Tour of Flanders
Race details
- Dates: 9 April 1978
- Stages: 1
- Distance: 260 km (161.6 mi)
- Winning time: 6h 12'

Results
	Winner	Walter Godefroot (BEL)	(IJsboerke–Gios)
	Second	Michel Pollentier (BEL)	(Flandria–Velda)
	Third	Gregor Braun (FRG)	(Peugeot–Esso)

The 62nd Tour of Flanders cycling classic was held on Sunday, 9 April 1978. The race was won by Belgian Walter Godefroot in a three-man sprint with Michel Pollentier and Gregor Braun. It was Godefroot's second win in the Tour of Flanders, after the 1968 event. 47 of 174 riders finished.

== Route ==
The race started in Sint Niklaas and finished in Meerbeke (Ninove) – covering 260 km. There were eight categorized climbs:

- Oude Kwaremont
- Koppenberg
- Taaienberg
- Eikenberg
- Volkegemberg
- Boigneberg
- Muur van Geraardsbergen
- Bosberg

== Results ==
Result
Rank	Rider	Team	Time
1	Walter Godefroot (BEL)	IJsboerke–Gios	6h 12' 00"
2	Michel Pollentier (BEL)	Flandria–De Clerck	s.t.
3	Gregor Braun (FRG)	Peugeot–Esso	s.t.
4	Jos Jacobs (BEL)	IJsboerke–Gios	+ 50"
5	Jean-Luc Vandenbroucke (BEL)	Peugeot–Esso	s.t.
6	Herman Van Springel (BEL)	Zeepcentrale Marc	s.t.
7	Francesco Moser (ITA)	Sanson	s.t.
8	Freddy Maertens (BEL)	Flandria–De Clerck	s.t.
9	Walter Planckaert (BEL)	C&A	s.t.
10	Roger De Vlaeminck (BEL)	Sanson	s.t.
