= 1970 Tour of Flanders =

Race details
- Dates: 5 April 1970
- Stages: 1
- Distance: 265 km (164.7 mi)
- Winning time: 6h 24'

Results
	Winner	Eric Leman (BEL)	(Flandria–Mars)
	Second	Walter Godefroot (BEL)	(Salvarani-Chiorda)
	Third	Eddy Merckx (BEL)	(Faemino–Faema)

The 54th running of the Tour of Flanders cycling race in Belgium was held on Sunday 5 April 1970. Belgian Eric Leman won ahead of Walter Godefroot and Eddy Merckx, winning his first of three in the classic The race started in Ghent and finished in Gentbrugge. 37 out of 173 riders arrived.

== Course ==
On the ascent of the Muur van Geraardsbergen Frenchman Roger Pingeon broke clear from the peloton. Eddy Merckx was the favourite to win the race and counter-attacked with Walter Godefroot and Eric Leman. They caught Pingeon on the Bosberg, the climb that made its first appearance in the Tour of Flanders. Pingeon was distanced in the finale and Merckx suffered a puncture in the ultimate kilometer. Leman beat Godefroot in a highly contested two-man sprint and won the race, Merckx finished third.

== Climbs ==
There were eight categorized climbs:

- Kwaremont
- Kruisberg
- Edelareberg
- Steenbeekberg
- Muur van Geraardsbergen
- Bosberg
- Valkenberg
- Semmerzake

== Results ==
	Cyclist	Team	Time
1	Eric Leman (BEL)	Flandria–Mars	6h 24'
2	Walter Godefroot (BEL)	Salvarani-Chiorda	s.t.
3	Eddy Merckx (BEL)	Faemino–Faema	+ 10"
4	Frans Verbeeck (BEL)	Geens–Watney	s.t.
5	Roger Rosiers (BEL)	Bic	s.t.
6	Jean-Pierre Monseré (BEL)	Flandria–Mars	+ 25"
7	Patrick Sercu (BEL)	Dreher	s.t.
8	Jan Janssen (NED)	Bic	s.t.
9	Daniel Van Ryckeghem (BEL)	Mann–Grundig	s.t.
10	Evert Dolman (NED)	Willem II–Gazelle	s.t.
