= 1975 Liège–Bastogne–Liège =

Race details
- Dates: 20 April 1975
- Stages: 1
- Distance: 246.7 km (153.3 mi)
- Winning time: 6h 27' 00"

Results
	Winner	Eddy Merckx (BEL)	(Molteni–RYC)
	Second	Bernard Thévenet (FRA)	(Peugeot–BP–Michelin)
	Third	Walter Godefroot (BEL)	(Carpenter–Confortluxe–Flandria)

The 1975 Liège–Bastogne–Liège was the 61st edition of the Liège–Bastogne–Liège cycle race and was held on 20 April 1975. The race started and finished in Liège. The race was won by Eddy Merckx of the Molteni team.

== General classification ==
Final general classification

Rank	Rider	Team	Time
1	Eddy Merckx (BEL)	Molteni–RYC	6h 27' 00"
2	Bernard Thévenet (FRA)	Peugeot–BP–Michelin	+ 2"
3	Walter Godefroot (BEL)	Carpenter–Confortluxe–Flandria	+ 2"
4	Frans Verbeeck (BEL)	Maes Pils–Watney	+ 15"
5	André Dierickx (BEL)	Rokado	+ 15"
6	Gerrie Knetemann (NED)	Gan–Mercier–Hutchinson	+ 15"
7	Jean-Pierre Danguillaume (FRA)	Peugeot–BP–Michelin	+ 15"
8	Roger De Vlaeminck (BEL)	Brooklyn	+ 15"
9	Christian Seznec (FRA)	Gan–Mercier–Hutchinson	+ 15"
10	Wladimiro Panizza (ITA)	Brooklyn	+ 15"
