= 1971 Critérium du Dauphiné Libéré =

Race details
- Dates: 18–23 May 1971
- Stages: 6
- Distance: 992.5 km (616.7 mi)
- Winning time: 26h 42' 39"

Results
	Winner	Eddy Merckx (BEL)	(Molteni)
	Second	Luis Ocaña (ESP)	(Bic)
	Third	Bernard Thévenet (FRA)	(Peugeot–BP–Michelin)
	Mountains	Luis Ocaña (ESP)	(Bic)
	Team	Bic	

The 1971 Critérium du Dauphiné Libéré was the 23rd edition of the cycle race and was held from 18 May to 23 May 1971. The race started in Avignon and finished at Montceau-les-Mines. The race was won by Eddy Merckx of the Molteni team.

== Teams ==
Nine teams, containing a total of 90 riders, participated in the race:

- Bic
- Hoover–de Gribaldy–Wolber
- Flandria–Mars
- Fagor–Mercier–Hutchinson
- Molteni
- Orbea–Legnano
- Peugeot–BP–Michelin
- Sonolor–Lejeune
- Watney–Avia

== Route ==
Stage characteristics and winners
Stage	Date	Course	Distance	Type	Winner
P	18 May	Avignon	8.5 km (5.3 mi)	Team time trial	Molteni
1a	19 May	Orange to Tournon-sur-Rhône	128 km (80 mi)		Eric Leman (BEL)
1b	19 May	Tournon-sur-Rhône to Saint-Étienne	76 km (47 mi)		Eric Leman (BEL)
2	20 May	Saint-Étienne to Grenoble	196 km (122 mi)		André Dierickx (BEL)
3	21 May	Grenoble to Annecy	181 km (112 mi)		Bernard Labourdette (FRA)
4	22 May	Annecy to Mâcon	230 km (140 mi)		André Dierickx (BEL)
5a	23 May	Mâcon to Le Creusot	146 km (91 mi)		Eric Leman (BEL)
5b	23 May	Le Creusot to Montceau-les-Mines	27 km (17 mi)	Individual time trial	Eddy Merckx (BEL)

== General classification ==
Final general classification

Rank	Rider	Team	Time
1	Eddy Merckx (BEL)	Molteni	26h 42' 39"
2	Luis Ocaña (ESP)	Bic	+ 54"
3	Bernard Thévenet (FRA)	Peugeot–BP–Michelin	+ 1' 43"
4	Raymond Poulidor (FRA)	Fagor–Mercier–Hutchinson	+ 1' 46"
5	Désiré Letort (FRA)	Bic	+ 2' 24"
6	Yves Hézard (FRA)	Sonolor–Lejeune	+ 2' 31"
7	Lucien Van Impe (BEL)	Sonolor–Lejeune	+ 3' 20"
8	Jean Jourden (FRA)	Fagor–Mercier–Hutchinson	+ 3' 38"
9	Ferdinand Bracke (BEL)	Peugeot–BP–Michelin	+ 3' 51"
10	Robert Bouloux (FRA)	Peugeot–BP–Michelin	+ 4' 18"
