= 1973 Paris–Roubaix =

Race details
- Dates: 15 April 1973
- Stages: 1
- Distance: 272.5 km (169.3 mi)
- Winning time: 7h 28' 43"

Results
	Winner	Eddy Merckx (BEL)	(Molteni)
	Second	Walter Godefroot (BEL)	(Flandria–Carpenter–Shimano)
	Third	Roger Rosiers (BEL)	(Bic)

The 1973 Paris–Roubaix was the 71st edition of the Paris–Roubaix cycle race and was held on 15 April 1973. The race started in Compiègne and finished in Roubaix. The race was won by Eddy Merckx of the Molteni team.

== General classification ==
Final general classification

Rank	Rider	Team	Time
1	Eddy Merckx (BEL)	Molteni	7h 28' 43"
2	Walter Godefroot (BEL)	Flandria–Carpenter–Shimano	+ 2' 20"
3	Roger Rosiers (BEL)	Bic	+ 2' 20"
4	Walter Planckaert (BEL)	Watney–Maes Pils	+ 7' 18"
5	Freddy Maertens (BEL)	Flandria–Carpenter–Shimano	+ 7' 18"
6	Frans Verbeeck (BEL)	Watney–Maes Pils	+ 7' 46"
7	Roger De Vlaeminck (BEL)	Brooklyn	+ 7' 46"
8	Herman Van Springel (BEL)	Rokado–De Gribaldy	+ 7' 46"
9	Régis Delépine (FRA)	Gan–Mercier–Hutchinson	+ 11' 53"
10	Raymond Poulidor (FRA)	Gan–Mercier–Hutchinson	+ 11' 53"
