= 1973 Tour of Flanders =

Race details
- Dates: 1 April 1973
- Stages: 1
- Distance: 263 km (163 mi)
- Winning time: 6h 17'

Results
| | Winner | Eric Leman (BEL) | (Peugeot–BP) |
| | Second | Freddy Maertens (BEL) | (Flandria-Shimano) |
| | Third | Eddy Merckx (BEL) | (Molteni) |

The 57th running of the Tour of Flanders cycling race in Belgium was held on Sunday 1 April 1973. Belgian Eric Leman won the classic ahead of Freddy Maertens and Eddy Merckx. The race started in Ghent and finished for the first time in Meerbeke (Ninove). 37 out of 174 riders arrived.

== Course ==
Cycling icon Eddy Merckx was the pre-race favourite, but despite several attempts, he failed to distance Leman, Maertens and De Geest on the Muur van Geraardsbergen and the run-in to the finish. In a four-man sprint Eric Leman narrowly beat Freddy Maertens. Merckx was third. Leman became the third rider to win the Tour of Flanders three times, equalling the previous record of Achiel Buysse and Fiorenzo Magni.

== Climbs ==
There were six categorized climbs:

- Oude Kwaremont
- Nieuwe Kruisberg
- Edelareberg
- Varent
- Valkenberg
- Muur of Geraardsbergen

== Results ==
| | Cyclist | Team | Time |
|---|---|---|---|
| 1 | Eric Leman (BEL) | Peugeot–BP | 6h 17' 00" |
| 2 | Freddy Maertens (BEL) | Flandria-Shimano | s.t. |
| 3 | Eddy Merckx (BEL) | Molteni | s.t. |
| 4 | Willy De Geest (BEL) | Rokado | s.t. |
| 5 | Joop Zoetemelk (NED) | Gitane | + 45" |
| 6 | Walter Godefroot (BEL) | Flandria-Shimano | + 51" |
| 7 | Frans Verbeeck (BEL) | Watneys–Maes | s.t. |
| 8 | Herman Van Springel (BEL) | Rokado | s.t. |
| 9 | Patrick Sercu (BEL) | Brooklyn | + 1'20" |
| 10 | Willy In't Ven (BEL) | Molteni | s.t. |
