= 1968 Gent–Wevelgem =

Race details
- Dates: 16 April 1968
- Stages: 1
- Distance: 250 km (160 mi)
- Winning time: 5h 50' 00"

Results
	Winner	Walter Godefroot (BEL)	(Flandria–De Clerck)
	Second	Willy Van Neste (BEL)	(Bic)
	Third	Felice Gimondi (ITA)	(Salvarani)

The 1968 Gent–Wevelgem was the 30th edition of the Belgian Gent–Wevelgem cycle race and was held on 16 April 1968. The race started in Ghent and finished in Wevelgem. The race was won by Walter Godefroot of the Flandria team.

== General classification ==
Final general classification

Rank	Rider	Team	Time
1	Walter Godefroot (BEL)	Flandria–De Clerck	5h 50' 00"
2	Willy Van Neste (BEL)	Bic	+ 0"
3	Felice Gimondi (ITA)	Salvarani	+ 0"
4	André Planckaert (BEL)	Goldor–Gerka	+ 0"
5	Bernard Van de Kerckhove (BEL)	Pelforth–Sauvage–Lejeune	+ 0"
6	Roger Cooreman (BEL)	Dr. Mann–Grundig	+ 0"
7	Herman Van Springel (BEL)	Dr. Mann–Grundig	+ 32"
8	Rik Van Looy (BEL)	Willem II–Gazelle	+ 40"
9	Eddy Merckx (BEL)	Faema	+ 40"
10	Jaak De Boever (BEL)	Smith's	+ 40"
