= 1974 Tour of Flanders =

Race details
- Dates: 31 March 1974
- Stages: 1
- Distance: 256 km (159.1 mi)
- Winning time: 6h 10'

Results
	Winner	Cees Bal (NED)	(Gan–Mercier)
	Second	Frans Verbeeck (BEL)	(Maes–Watneys)
	Third	~~Walter Godefroot~~ (BEL)	(Flandria–Carpenter)

The 58th running of the Tour of Flanders cycling race in Belgium was held on Sunday 31 March 1974. Dutchman Cees Bal won the classic ahead of Frans Verbeeck and Eddy Merckx. The race started in Ghent and finished in Meerbeke (Ninove).

== Course ==
A group of 40 was formed after the Oude Kwaremont, further reduced on the Muur van Geraardsbergen. At six kilometers from the finish Cees Bal broke clear from the group, powering on to the victory in Meerbeke.

In 1974, Bal was part of the Gan–Mercier cycling team, and was a team mate of Joop Zoetemelk. Shortly before the Ronde, in the Setmana Catalana de Ciclisme, Zoetemelk took over the lead from Bal in the final stage, and Bal felt betrayed. In the night before the Tour of Flanders, Bal refused to sleep in the same hotel as Zoetemelk, and preferred to stay in his own house in the Netherlands. In the morning, he rode to the start of the Ronde, and fueled by anger, won the race.

== Climbs ==
There were seven categorized climbs:

- Oude Kwaremont
- Nieuwe Kruisberg
- Taaienberg
- Eikenberg
- Volkegemberg
- Varent
- Muur of Geraardsbergen

== Results ==
	Cyclist	Team	Time
1	Cees Bal (NED)	Gan–Mercier	6h 10' 00"
2	Frans Verbeeck (BEL)	Watneys–Maes	+ 19"
3	~~Walter Godefroot~~ (BEL)	Flandria–Carpenter	s.t.
4	Eddy Merckx (BEL)	Molteni	s.t.
5	Eric Leman (BEL)	Mic–Ludo	s.t.
6	Marc Demeyer (BEL)	Flandria–Carpenter	+ 0'45"
7	Gerben Karstens (NED)	Bic	+0'51"
8	Rik Van Linden (BEL)	IJsboerke–Colner	s.t.
9	Patrick Sercu (BEL)	Brooklyn (cycling team)	s.t.
10	Wilfried Wesemael (BEL)	Mic–Ludo	+ 1' 23"

Note: third-place finished Walter Godefroot tested positive for doping after the race and was disqualified, moving Merckx up to third.
