= 1969 Milan–San Remo =

Race details
- Dates: 19 March 1969
- Stages: 1
- Distance: 288 km (179 mi)
- Winning time: 6h 37' 56"

Results
	Winner	Eddy Merckx (BEL)	(Faema)
	Second	Roger De Vlaeminck (BEL)	(Flandria–De Clerck–Krüger)
	Third	Marino Basso (ITA)	(Molteni)

The 1969 Milan–San Remo was the 60th edition of the Milan–San Remo cycle race and was held on 19 March 1969. The race started in Milan and finished in San Remo. The race was won by Eddy Merckx of the Faema team.

== General classification ==
Final general classification

Rank	Rider	Team	Time
1	Eddy Merckx (BEL)	Faema	6h 37' 56"
2	Roger De Vlaeminck (BEL)	Flandria–De Clerck–Krüger	+ 12"
3	Marino Basso (ITA)	Molteni	+ 12"
4	Dino Zandegù (ITA)	Salvarani	+ 12"
5	Walter Godefroot (BEL)	Flandria–De Clerck–Krüger	+ 12"
6	René Pijnen (NED)	Willem II–Gazelle	+ 12"
7	Jan Janssen (NED)	Bic	+ 12"
8	Georges Van Coningsloo (BEL)	Peugeot–BP–Michelin	+ 12"
9	Eric Leman (BEL)	Flandria–De Clerck–Krüger	+ 12"
10	Daniel Van Ryckeghem (BEL)	Dr. Mann–Grundig	+ 12"
