= 1969 Dwars door België =

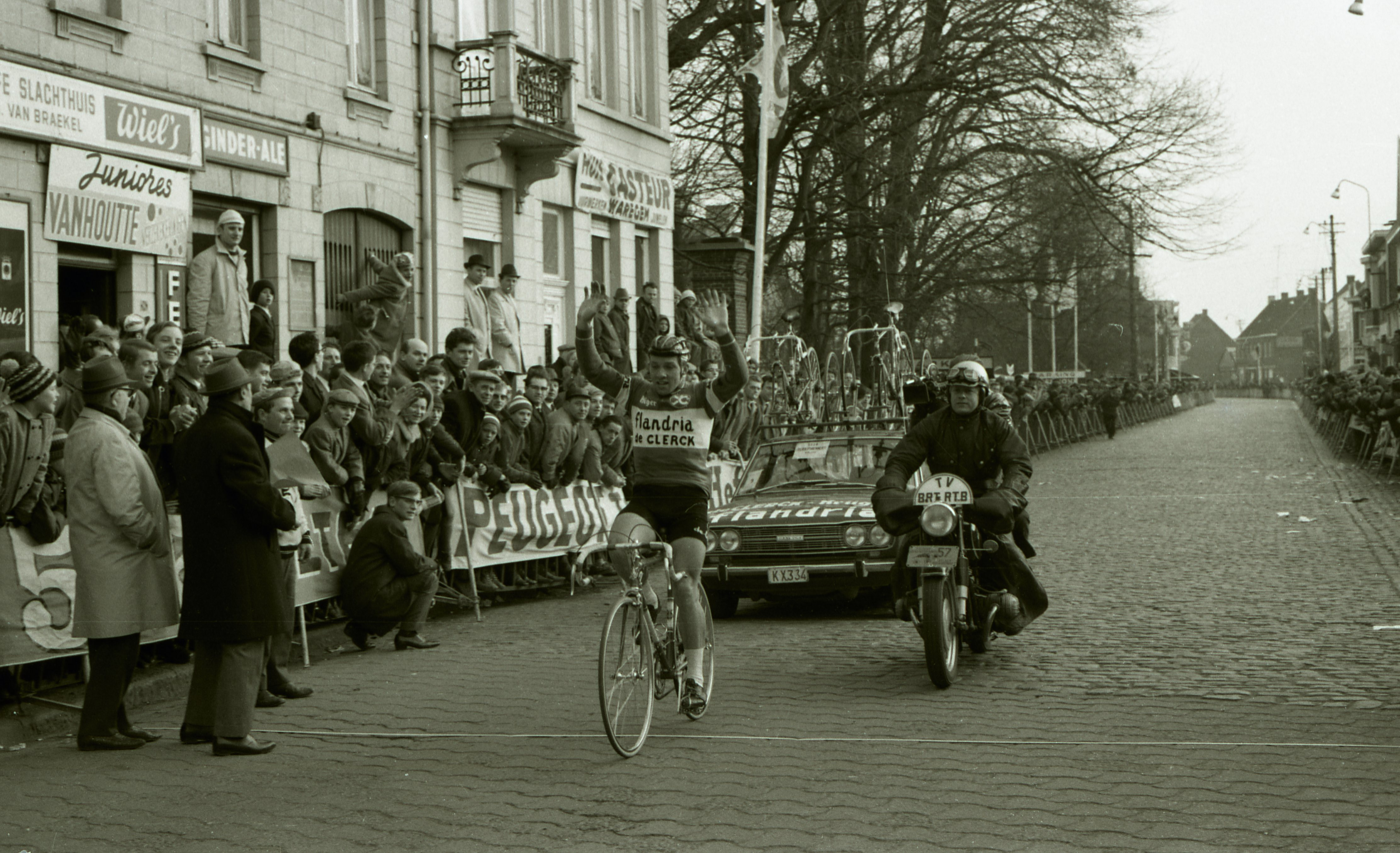
- Leman winning 1969 Dwars Door België in Waregem, (Collection KOERS. Museum van de Wielersport)

Race details
- Dates: 25 March 1969
- Stages: 1
- Distance: 200 km (124.3 mi)
- Winning time: 5h 14' 00"

Results
	Winner	Eric Leman (BEL)
	Second	Albert Van Vlierberghe (BEL)
	Third	Willy Van Neste (BEL)

The 1969 Dwars door België was the 25th edition of the Dwars door Vlaanderen cycle race and was held on 25 March 1969. The race started and finished in Waregem. The race was won by Eric Leman.

== General classification ==
Final general classification

Rank	Rider	Time
1	Eric Leman (BEL)	5h 14' 00"
2	Albert Van Vlierberghe (BEL)	+ 25"
3	Willy Van Neste (BEL)	+ 25"
4	Wim du Bois (NED)	+ 1' 10"
5	Walter Godefroot (BEL)	+ 1' 45"
6	Jacques De Boever (BEL)	+ 2' 00"
7	Walter Boucquet (BEL)	+ 2' 05"
8	Christian Callens (BEL)	+ 2' 15"
9	Roger Rosiers (BEL)	+ 2' 15"
10	Leo Van Dam (BEL)	+ 2' 15"
