= 1975 Dwars door België =

Race details
- Dates: 23 March 1975
- Stages: 1
- Distance: 210 km (130.5 mi)
- Winning time: 5h 07' 00"

Results
	Winner	Cees Priem (NED)
	Second	Tino Tabak (NED)
	Third	Roger Swerts (BEL)

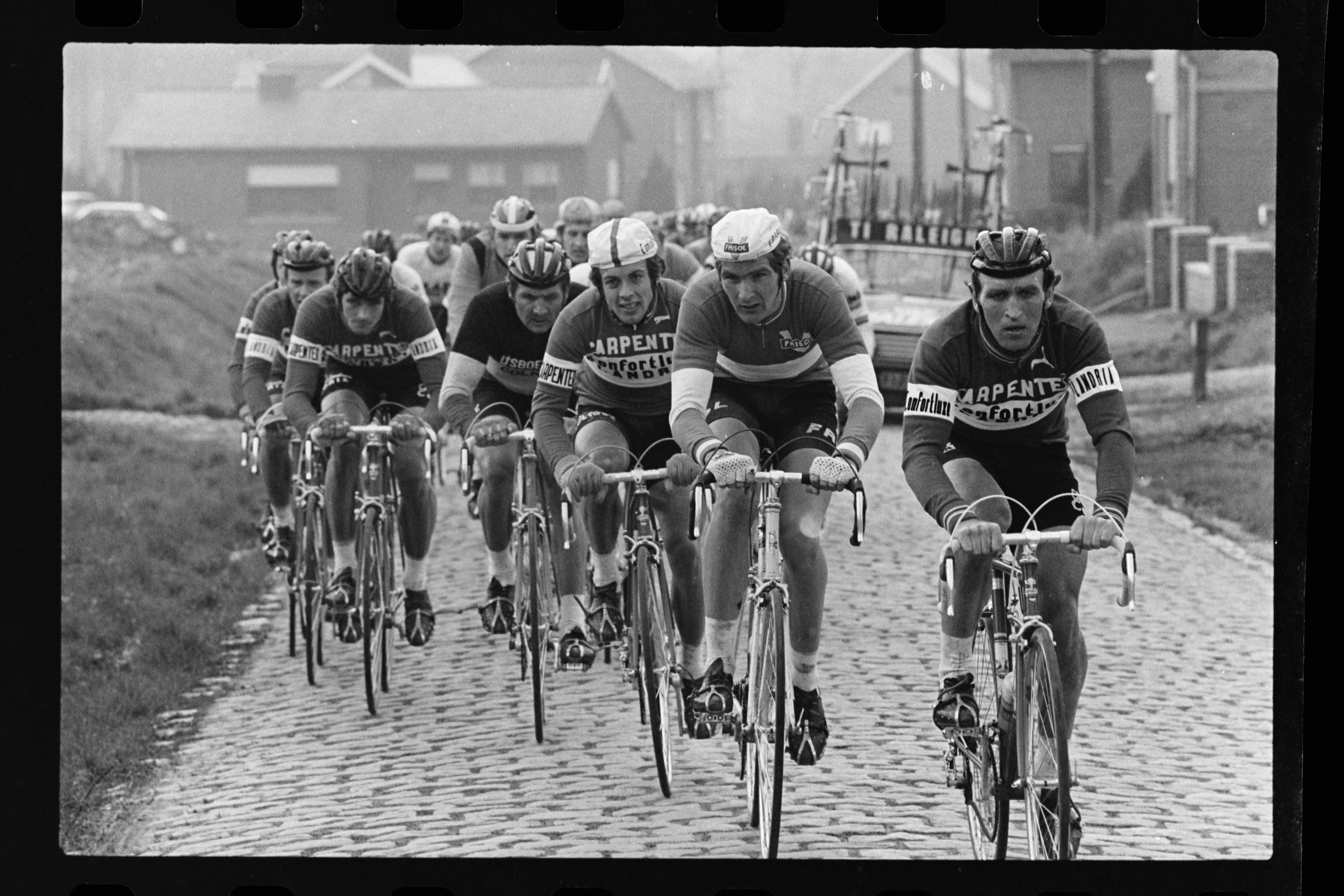
Walter Godefroot leads the peloton, before Dutch champion Cees Priem, a teammate and Belgian champion Roger Swerts. Photo: Maurice Terryn.

The 1975 Dwars door België was the 30th edition of the Dwars door Vlaanderen cycle race and was held on 23 March 1975. The race started and finished in Waregem. The race was won by Cees Priem.

== General classification ==
Final general classification

Rank	Rider	Time
1	Cees Priem (NED)	5h 07' 00"
2	Tino Tabak (NED)	+ 20"
3	Roger Swerts (BEL)	+ 20"
4	Walter Godefroot (BEL)	+ 20"
5	Frans Verhaegen (BEL)	+ 20"
6	Luc Leman (BEL)	+ 20"
7	Marcel Laurens (BEL)	+ 53"
8	Serge Vandaele (BEL)	+ 53"
9	Wim de Waal (NED)	+ 53"
10	Roy Schuiten (NED)	+ 53"
