= 1976 Tour of Flanders =

Race details
- Dates: 4 April 1976
- Stages: 1
- Distance: 261 km (162.2 mi)
- Winning time: 6h 10' 00"

Results
	Winner	Walter Planckaert (BEL)	(Maes–Rokado)
	Second	Francesco Moser (ITA)	(Sanson)
	Third	Marc Demeyer (BEL)	(Flandria–Velda)

The 60th running of the Tour of Flanders cycling race in Belgium was held on Sunday 4 April 1976. Belgian Walter Planckaert won before Francesco Moser and Marc Demeyer. It was the last time the race started in its original starting place, Ghent. The finish was in Meerbeke (Ninove).

== Course ==
The Koppenberg climb, stirring much controversy for its steep and unevenly cobbled surface, was included in the route for the first time. Only the first five riders managed to make it all the way riding, the rest had to shoulder their bikes to the top. Cycling legend Eddy Merckx was seen strolling helplessly through a tangle of riders and spectators.

In the final kilometers a group of five headed to the finish. Freddy Maertens and Roger De Vlaeminck, two of Belgium's star riders, were favourites to win the sprint, but the two did not get on and let themselves jointly be dropped 4 km before the finish. Walter Planckaert won in a three-man sprint before Italian Francesco Moser and Marc Demeyer. De Vlaeminck beat Maertens for fourth place, recognizing his mistake, but stated "he did not want Maertens to win".

== Climbs ==
There were nine categorized climbs in this edition:

- Oude Kwaremont
- Nieuwe Kruisberg
- Koppenberg
- Taaienberg
- Eikenberg
- Volkegemberg
- Varent
- Muur van Geraardsbergen
- Bosberg

== Results ==
	Cyclist	Team	Time
1	Walter Planckaert (BEL)	Maes–Rokado	6h 10' 00"
2	Francesco Moser (ITA)	Sanson	s.t.
3	Marc Demeyer (BEL)	Flandria–Velda	s.t.
4	Roger De Vlaeminck (BEL)	Brooklyn	+ 16"
5	Freddy Maertens (BEL)	Flandria–Velda	s.t.
6	Willy Teirlinck (BEL)	Gitane–Campagnolo	+ 22"
7	Eric Leman (BEL)	Zoppas–Splendor	s.t.
8	Walter Godefroot (BEL)	IJsboerke–Colnago	s.t.
9	Frans Verbeeck (BEL)	IJsboerke–Colnago	s.t.
10	André Dierickx (BEL)	Maes–Rokado	s.t.
