= Kerselare =

- Hamlet and pilgrimage site
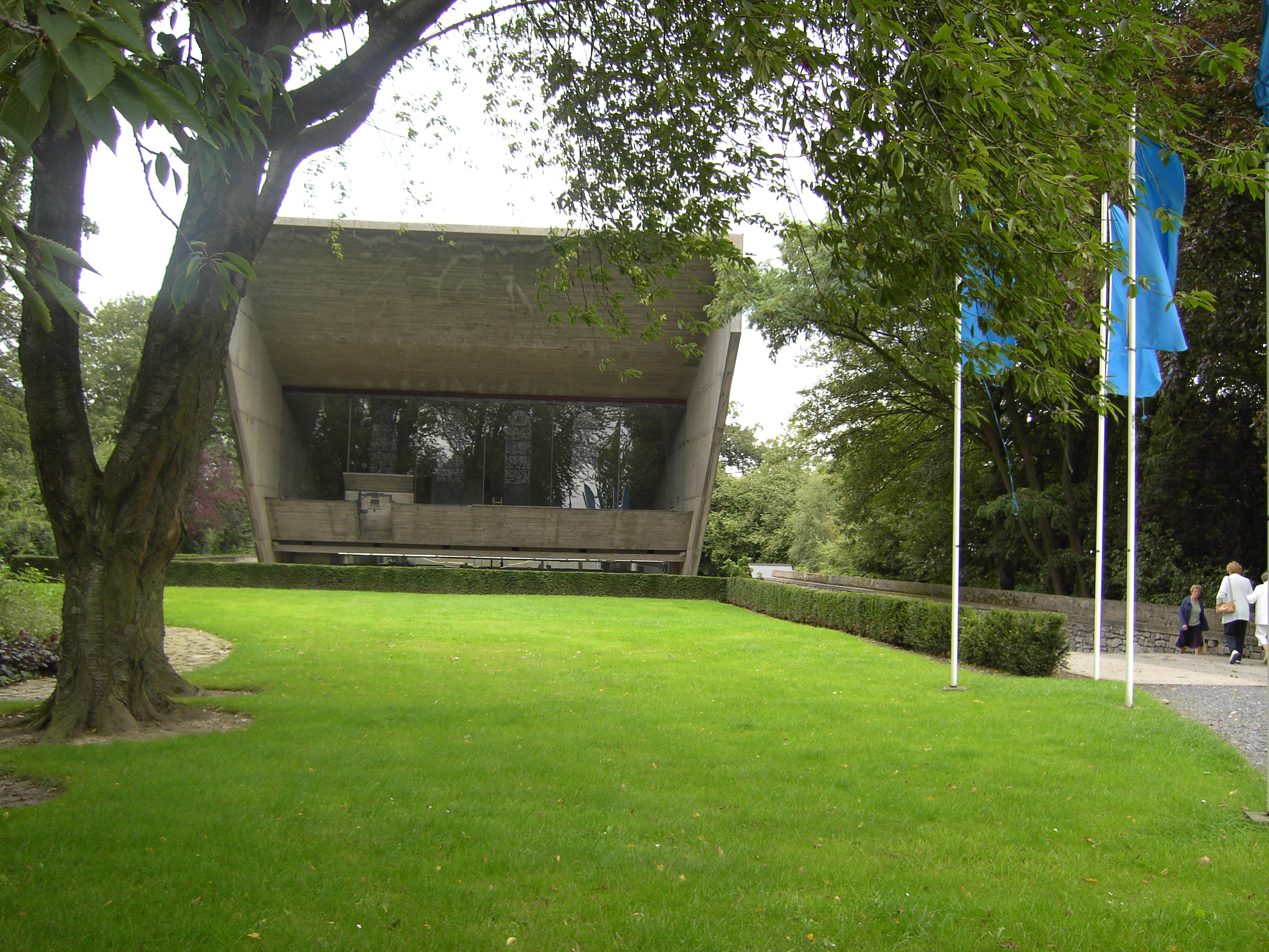
- Chapel of Kerselare (2007)

- Location in Belgium
- Coordinates: 50.83012°N 3.62958°E
- Country: Belgium
- Region: Flemish Region
- Province: East Flanders
- Municipality: Oudenaarde

Area
  - Total: 1.40 km^{2} (0.54 sq mi)

Population (2021)
  - Total: 199
  - Density: 142/km^{2} (368/sq mi)
- Time zone: CET

Kerselare (also Kerzelare) is a hamlet and pilgrimage site in Edelare, a village belonging to the municipality of Oudenaarde in the province of East Flanders, Belgium. Kerselare is located on the Edelareberg, the highest point of Edelare

Kerselare is host to a pilgrimage chapel, which origins goes back to the 15th century. A Mary statue had been placed underneath a cherry tree (Kerselaar in Dutch), and several miracles had occurred. Later inns were later built to the north and east of the site.

A new chapel in Gothic Revival style was constructed in 1614. This chapel underwent renovation in 1887, but was destroyed by a fire in 1961. A new, post-modernic chapel building arose in 1966.
