= 1972 Tour of Flanders =

Race details
- Dates: 9 April 1972
- Stages: 1
- Distance: 250 km (155.3 mi)
- Winning time: 6h 05'

Results
	Winner	Eric Leman (BEL)	(Bic)
	Second	André Dierickx (BEL)	(Flandria–Beaulieu)
	Third	Frans Verbeeck (BEL)	(Watneys–Avia)

The 56th running of the Tour of Flanders cycling race in Belgium was held on Sunday 9 April 1972. Belgian Eric Leman won ahead of André Dierickx and Frans Verbeeck, winning the classic for the second time. The race started in Ghent and finished in Gentbrugge. 80 out of 171 riders arrived.

== Course ==
The race was run in bad weather, leading to a group of 30. Eddy Merckx and Eric Leman broke away from the group, but Felice Gimondi brought the rest back. Merckx, suffering severe back pain, was forced to walk up the Muur van Geraardsbergen, but returned afterwards. At 10 km from the finish, a group of seven was formed, sprinting for the win. Leman narrowly beat André Dierickx. Merckx finished seventh.

== Climbs ==
There were six categorized climbs:

- Oude Kwaremont
- Hoogberg-Hotond
- Steenbeekberg
- Muur of Geraardsbergen
- Valkenberg
- Berg Hostellerie

== Results ==
	Cyclist	Team	Time
1	Eric Leman (BEL)	Bic	6h 05'
2	André Dierickx (BEL)	Flandria–Beaulieu	s.t.
3	Frans Verbeeck (BEL)	Watneys–Avia	s.t.
4	Willy De Geest (BEL)	Van Cauter – Magniflex – De Gribaldy	s.t.
5	Roger Rosiers (BEL)	Bic	s.t.
6	Roger Swerts (BEL)	Molteni	s.t.
7	Eddy Merckx (BEL)	Molteni	s.t.
8	Alain Santy (FRA)	Bic	+ 20"
9	Herman Van Springel (BEL)	Molteni	s.t.
10	Willy Planckaert (BEL)	Goldor-IJsboerke	s.t.
