= 1976 Milan–San Remo =

Race details
- Dates: 19 March 1976
- Stages: 1
- Distance: 288 km (179 mi)
- Winning time: 6h 55' 28"

Results
	Winner	Eddy Merckx (BEL)	(Molteni–Campagnolo)
	Second	Wladimiro Panizza (ITA)	(Scic)
	Third	~~Jean-Luc Vandenbroucke~~	(~~Peugeot–Esso–Michelin~~)

The 1976 Milan–San Remo was the 67th edition of the Milan–San Remo cycle race and was held on 19 March 1976. The race started in Milan and finished in San Remo. The race was won by Eddy Merckx of the Molteni team.

== General classification ==
Final general classification

Rank	Rider	Team	Time
1	Eddy Merckx (BEL)	Molteni–Campagnolo	6h 55' 28"
2	Wladimiro Panizza (ITA)	Scic	+ 28"
~~3~~	~~Jean-Luc Vandenbroucke (BEL)~~	~~Peugeot–Esso–Michelin~~	~~+ 28"~~ (Note: Vandenbroucke failed a drug test and was disqualified from third place.)
4	Michel Laurent (FRA)	Miko–de Gribaldy–Superia	+ 31"
5	Walter Planckaert (BEL)	Maes Pils–Rokado	+ 33"
6	Rik Van Linden (BEL)	Bianchi–Campagnolo	+ 33"
7	Patrick Sercu (BEL)	Brooklyn	+ 33"
8	Roger De Vlaeminck (BEL)	Brooklyn	+ 33"
9	Francesco Moser (ITA)	Sanson	+ 33"
10	Walter Godefroot (BEL)	IJsboerke–Colnago	+ 33"
