= 1969 Paris–Roubaix =

Race details
- Dates: 13 April 1969
- Stages: 1
- Distance: 264 km (164.0 mi)
- Winning time: 6h 46' 47"

Results
	Winner	Walter Godefroot (BEL)	(Flandria–De Clerck–Krüger)
	Second	Eddy Merckx (BEL)	(Faema)
	Third	Willy Vekemans (BEL)	(Goldor–Hertekamp–Gerka)

The 1969 Paris–Roubaix was the 67th edition of the Paris–Roubaix cycle race and was held on 13 April 1969. The race started in Compiègne and finished in Roubaix. The race was won by Walter Godefroot of the Flandria team.

== General classification ==
Final general classification

Rank	Rider	Team	Time
1	Walter Godefroot (BEL)	Flandria–De Clerck–Krüger	6h 46' 47"
2	Eddy Merckx (BEL)	Faema	+ 2' 39"
3	Willy Vekemans (BEL)	Goldor–Hertekamp–Gerka	+ 2' 39"
4	Felice Gimondi (ITA)	Salvarani	+ 2' 39"
5	Roger De Vlaeminck (BEL)	Flandria–De Clerck–Krüger	+ 2' 39"
6	Cees Zoontjens (NED)	Caballero	+ 10' 25"
7	Cyrille Guimard (FRA)	Mercier–BP–Hutchinson	+ 10' 39"
8	Patrick Sercu (BEL)	Faema	+ 10' 39"
9	Willy Bocklant (BEL)	Pull Over Centrale–Novy	+ 10' 39"
10	Barry Hoban (GBR)	Mercier–BP–Hutchinson	+ 10' 39"
