= 1969 Scheldeprijs =

Race details
- Dates: 29 July 1969
- Stages: 1
- Distance: 241 km (149.8 mi)
- Winning time: 5h 35' 00"

Results
	Winner	Walter Godefroot (BEL)
	Second	Roger De Vlaeminck (BEL)
	Third	Rini Wagtmans (NED)

The 1969 Scheldeprijs was the 56th edition of the Scheldeprijs cycle race and was held on 29 July 1969. The race was won by Walter Godefroot.

== General classification ==
Final general classification

Rank	Rider	Time
1	Walter Godefroot (BEL)	5h 35' 00"
2	Roger De Vlaeminck (BEL)	+ 45"
3	Rini Wagtmans (NED)	+ 47"
4	Christian Callens (BEL)	+ 1' 00"
5	Etienne Buysse (BEL)	+ 1' 30"
6	Antoine Houbrechts (BEL)	+ 1' 40"
7	Victor Van Schil (BEL)	+ 1' 40"
8	Frans Verstraeten (BEL)	+ 1' 40"
9	Eddy Reyniers (BEL)	+ 1' 40"
10	Hubert Hutsebaut (BEL)	+ 1' 40"
