= 1966 Liège–Bastogne–Liège =

Race details
- Dates: 2 May 1966
- Stages: 1
- Distance: 253 km (157 mi)
- Winning time: 6h 59' 45"

Results
	Winner	Jacques Anquetil (FRA)	(Ford France–Hutchinson)
	Second	Victor Van Schil (BEL)	(Mercier–BP–Hutchinson)
	Third	Willy In 't Ven (BEL)	(Dr. Mann–Grundig)

The 1966 Liège–Bastogne–Liège was the 52nd edition of the Liège–Bastogne–Liège cycle race and was held on 2 May 1966. The race started and finished in Liège. The race was won by Jacques Anquetil of the Ford France team.

== General classification ==
Final general classification

Rank	Rider	Team	Time
1	Jacques Anquetil (FRA)	Ford France–Hutchinson	6h 59' 45"
2	Victor Van Schil (BEL)	Mercier–BP–Hutchinson	+ 4' 53"
3	Willy In 't Ven (BEL)	Dr. Mann–Grundig	+ 4' 54"
4	Walter Godefroot (BEL)	Wiel's–Gancia-Groene Leeuw	+ 5' 04"
5	Willy Planckaert (BEL)	Roméo–Smith's	+ 5' 24"
6	Michele Dancelli (ITA)	Molteni	+ 5' 24"
7	Willy Bocklant (BEL)	Dr. Mann–Grundig	+ 5' 24"
8	Eddy Merckx (BEL)	Peugeot–BP–Michelin	+ 5' 24"
9	Jos Huysmans (BEL)	Dr. Mann–Grundig	+ 5' 24"
10	Roger Swerts (BEL)	Mercier–BP–Hutchinson	+ 5' 24"
