= 1966 Dwars door België =

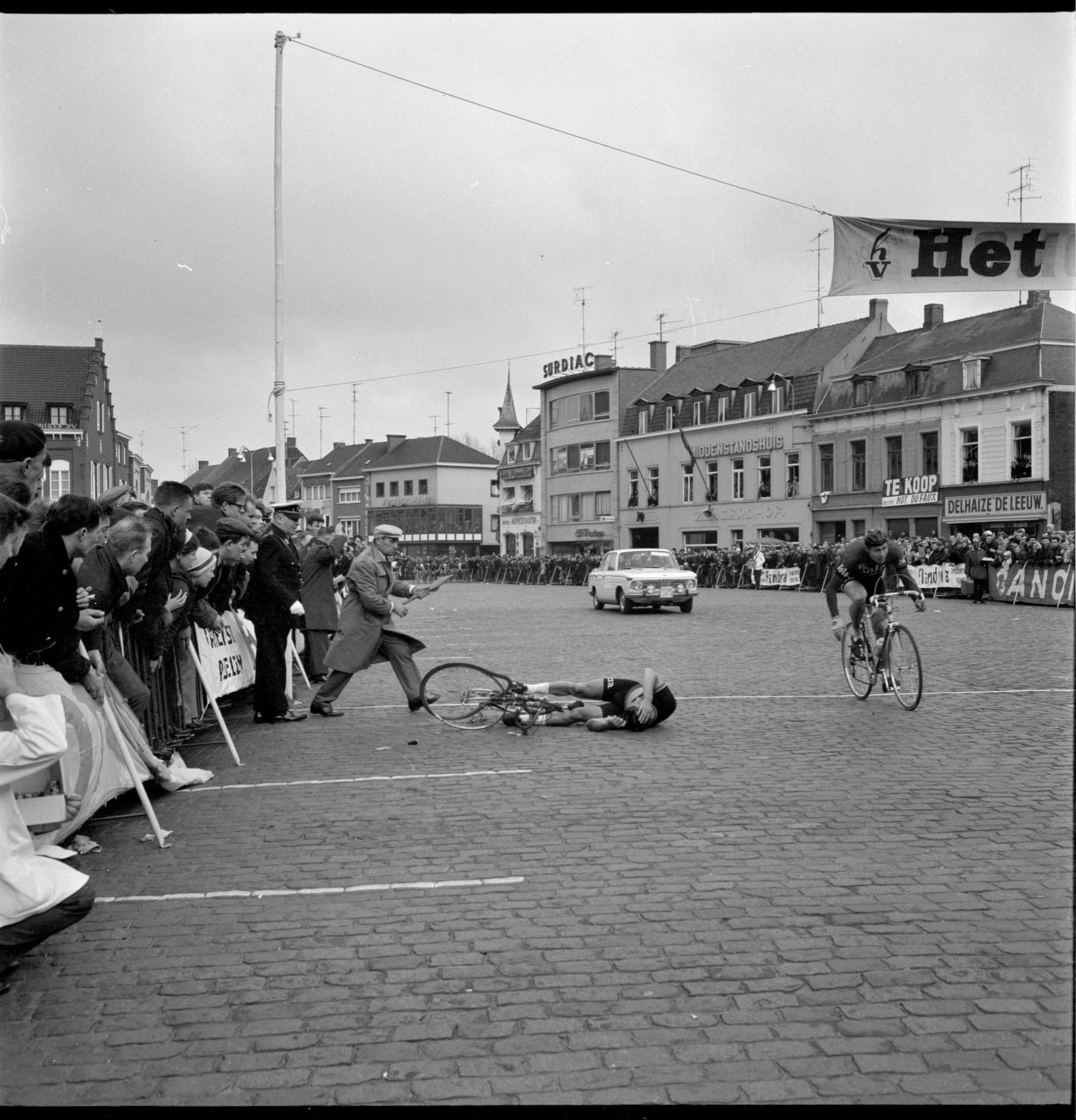
- Walter Godefroot crashing across the finish line. Peter Post finishing alongside him.

Race details
- Dates: 3 April 1966
- Stages: 1
- Distance: 200 km (124.3 mi)
- Winning time: 4h 45' 00"

Results
	Winner	Walter Godefroot (BEL)
	Second	Willy Bocklant (BEL)
	Third	Peter Post (NED)

The 1966 Dwars door België was the 22nd edition of the Dwars door Vlaanderen cycle race and was held on 3 April 1966. The race started and finished in Waregem. The race was won by Walter Godefroot.

== General classification ==
Final general classification

Rank	Rider	Time
1	Walter Godefroot (BEL)	4h 45' 00"
2	Willy Bocklant (BEL)	+ 0"
3	Peter Post (NED)	+ 0"
4	Eddy Merckx (BEL)	+ 0"
5	Gilbert Desmet (BEL)	+ 6"
6	Jan Janssen (NED)	+ 6"
7	Arthur Decabooter (BEL)	+ 6"
8	Georges Van Coningsloo (BEL)	+ 6"
9	Edward Sels (BEL)	+ 6"
10	Roger de Wilde (BEL)	+ 6"
