= 1967 Liège–Bastogne–Liège =

Race details
- Dates: 1 May 1967
- Stages: 1
- Distance: 256 km (159 mi)
- Winning time: 7h 07' 00"

Results
	Winner	Walter Godefroot (BEL)	(Flandria–De Clerck)
	Second	Eddy Merckx (BEL)	(Peugeot–BP–Michelin)
	Third	Willy Monty (BEL)	(Pelforth–Sauvage–Lejeune)

The 1967 Liège–Bastogne–Liège was the 53rd edition of the Liège–Bastogne–Liège cycle race and was held on 1 May 1967. The race started and finished in Liège. The race was won by Walter Godefroot of the Flandria team.

== General classification ==
Final general classification

Rank	Rider	Team	Time
1	Walter Godefroot (BEL)	Flandria–De Clerck	7h 07' 00"
2	Eddy Merckx (BEL)	Peugeot–BP–Michelin	+ 0"
3	Willy Monty (BEL)	Pelforth–Sauvage–Lejeune	+ 10"
4	Georges Vandenberghe (BEL)	Roméo–Smith's	+ 3' 10"
5	Vittorio Adorni (ITA)	Salamini–Luxor TV	+ 3' 25"
6	Flaviano Vicentini (ITA)	Salvarani	+ 3' 40"
7	Roger Rosiers (BEL)	Dr. Mann–Grundig	+ 3' 40"
8	Herman Van Springel (BEL)	Dr. Mann–Grundig	+ 3' 40"
9	Ferdinand Bracke (BEL)	Peugeot–BP–Michelin	+ 5' 00"
10	Franco Bitossi (ITA)	Filotex	+ 5' 30"
