= 1967 Milan–San Remo =

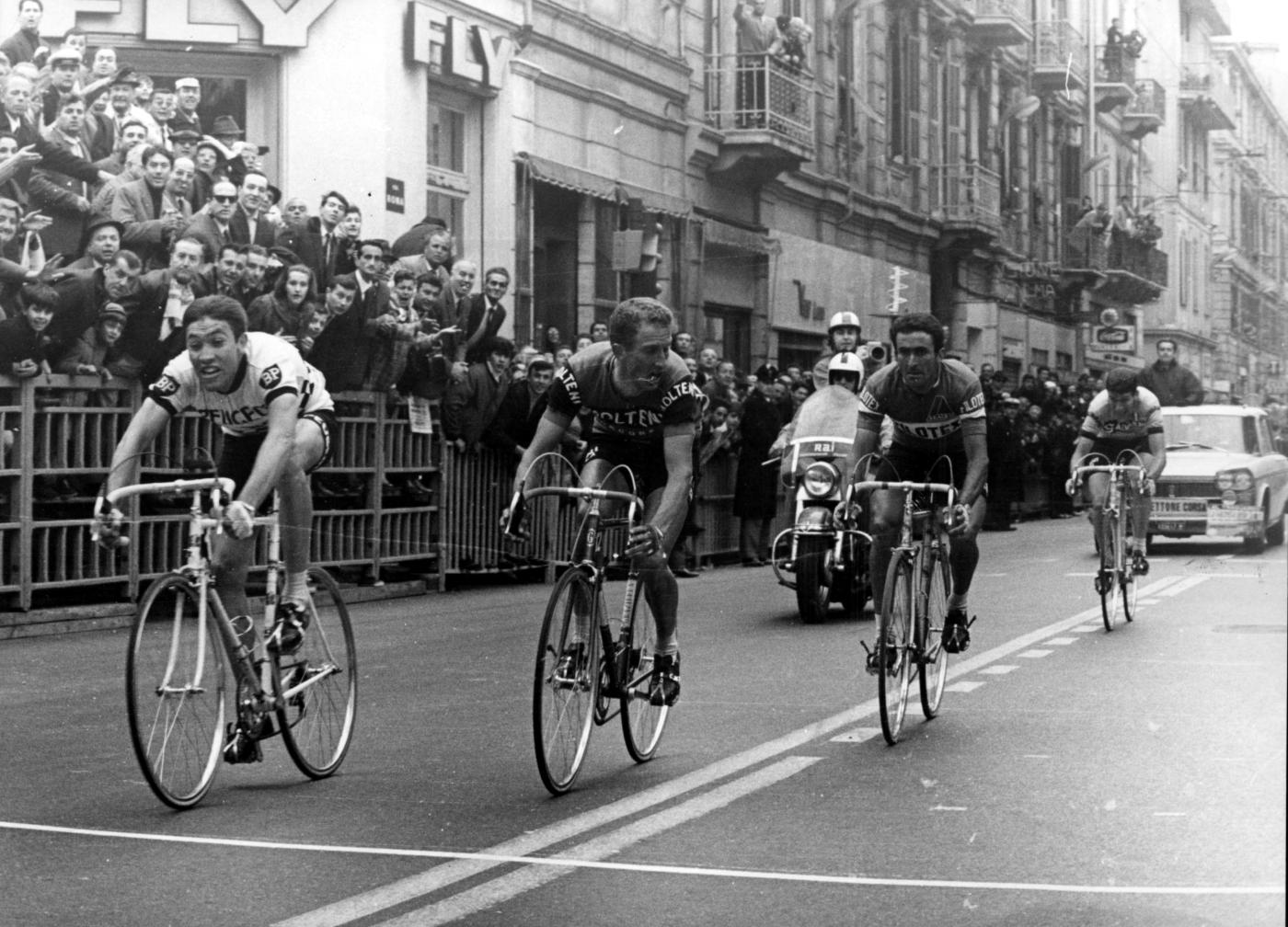
- Merckx wins ahead Motta, Bitossi and Gimondi

Race details
- Dates: March 18, 1967
- Stages: 1
- Distance: 288 km (179 mi)
- Winning time: 6h 25' 40"

Results
	Winner	Eddy Merckx (BEL)	(Peugeot–BP–Michelin)
	Second	Gianni Motta (ITA)	(Molteni)
	Third	Franco Bitossi (ITA)	(Filotex)

The 1967 Milan–San Remo cycling race took place on March 18, 1967, and was won by Peugeot-BP-Englebert's Eddy Merckx. It was the 58th edition of the Milan–San Remo "monument" classic race.

== Summary ==
The decisive attack was launched at 50 km from the finish by 20 riders, including Italians Felice Gimondi, Dino Zandegù, Gianni Motta, Franco Bitossi and the previous year's winner, Eddy Merckx. Merckx, left without teammates in the breakaway, broke solo at 20 km from the finish, before being joined by Gianni Motta. After the descent of the Poggio, Gimondi and Bitossi returned to the two leaders, leading to a four-man sprint on the Via Roma. Merckx easily won the sprint, sealing his second Primavera victory, and also established a new record average speed.

== Results ==
	Cyclist	Team	Time
1	Eddy Merckx (BEL)	Peugeot–BP–Michelin	6h 25' 40"
2	Gianni Motta (ITA)	Molteni	s.t.
3	Franco Bitossi (ITA)	Filotex	s.t.
4	Felice Gimondi (ITA)	Salvarani	s.t.
5	Georges Van Coningsloo (BEL)	Pelforth–Sauvage–Lejeune	+4"
6	Dino Zandegù (ITA)	Salvarani	s.t.
7	Walter Godefroot (BEL)	Flandria–De Clerck	s.t.
8	Willy Planckaert (BEL)	Roméo–Smith's	s.t.
9	Gerben Karstens (NED)	Televizier–Batavus	s.t.
10	Noël van Clooster (BEL)	Flandria–De Clerck	s.t.
