= 1965 Milan–San Remo =

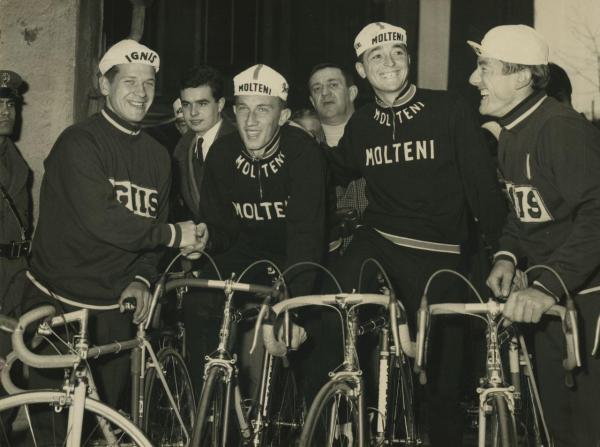
- Emile Daems, Gianni Motta, Michele Dancelli and Adriano Durante before the start

Race details
- Dates: 19 March 1965
- Stages: 1
- Distance: 287 km (178 mi)
- Winning time: 6h 53' 32"

Results
	Winner	Arie den Hartog (NED)	(Ford France–Gitane)
	Second	Vittorio Adorni (ITA)	(Salvarani)
	Third	Franco Balmamion (ITA)	(Sanson)

The 1965 Milan–San Remo was the 56th edition of the Milan–San Remo cycle race and was held on 19 March 1965. The race started in Milan and finished in San Remo. The race was won by Arie den Hartog of the Ford France team.

== General classification ==
Final general classification

Rank	Rider	Team	Time
1	Arie den Hartog (NED)	Ford France–Gitane	6h 53' 32"
2	Vittorio Adorni (ITA)	Salvarani	+ 0"
3	Franco Balmamion (ITA)	Sanson	+ 0"
4	Rolf Wolfshohl (FRG)	Mercier–BP–Hutchinson	+ 51"
5	Willy Vannitsen (BEL)	Ford France–Gitane	+ 55"
6	Jan Janssen (NED)	Pelforth–Sauvage–Lejeune	+ 55"
7	Franco Cribiori (ITA)	Ignis	+ 55"
8	Guido Reybrouck (BEL)	Flandria–Romeo	+ 55"
9	Gianni Motta (ITA)	Molteni	+ 55"
10	Flaviano Vicentini (ITA)	Ignis	+ 55"
