= 1968 Paris–Roubaix =

Race details
- Dates: 7 April 1968
- Stages: 1
- Distance: 264 km (164.0 mi)
- Winning time: 7h 09' 26"

Results
	Winner	Eddy Merckx (BEL)	(Faema)
	Second	Herman Van Springel (BEL)	(Dr. Mann–Grundig)
	Third	Walter Godefroot (BEL)	(Flandria–De Clerck)

The 1968 Paris–Roubaix was the 66th edition of the Paris–Roubaix cycle race and was held on 7 April 1968. The race started in Compiègne and finished in Roubaix. The race was won by Eddy Merckx of the Faema team. The 264 kilometres (164 mi) course included 56.5 kilometres (35.1 mi) of cobbles, with the Trouée d'Arenberg featuring for the first time.

== Result ==
Result (1–10)
Rank	Rider	Team	Time
1	Eddy Merckx (BEL)	Faema	7h 09' 26"
2	Herman Van Springel (BEL)	Dr. Mann–Grundig	+ 0"
3	Walter Godefroot (BEL)	Flandria–De Clerck	+ 1' 37"
4	Edward Sels (BEL)	Bic	+ 3' 11"
5	Victor Van Schil (BEL)	Faema	+ 3' 11"
6	Raymond Poulidor (FRA)	Mercier–BP–Hutchinson	+ 5' 05"
7	Henk Nijdam (NED)	Peugeot–BP–Michelin	+ 7' 46"
8	Jan Janssen (NED)	Pelforth–Sauvage–Lejeune	+ 8' 03"
9	Guido Reybrouck (BEL)	Faema	+ 8' 03"
10	Frans Melckenbeeck (BEL)	Pull Over Centrale–Novy	+ 8' 03"
