= 1970 Liège–Bastogne–Liège =

Race details
- Dates: 17 April 1970
- Stages: 1
- Distance: 235 km (146 mi)
- Winning time: 7h 02' 00"

Results
	Winner	Roger De Vlaeminck (BEL)	(Flandria–Mars)
	Second	Frans Verbeeck (BEL)	(Geens–Watney)
	Third	Eddy Merckx (BEL)	(Faemino–Faema)

The 1970 Liège–Bastogne–Liège was the 56th edition of the Liège–Bastogne–Liège cycle race and was held on 17 April 1970. The race started and finished in Liège. The race was won by Roger De Vlaeminck of the Flandria team.

== General classification ==
Final general classification

Rank	Rider	Team	Time
1	Roger De Vlaeminck (BEL)	Flandria–Mars	7h 02' 00"
2	Frans Verbeeck (BEL)	Geens–Watney	+ 12"
3	Eddy Merckx (BEL)	Faemino–Faema	+ 12"
4	Erik De Vlaeminck (BEL)	Flandria–Mars	+ 12"
5	Georges Pintens (BEL)	Dr. Mann–Grundig	+ 12"
6	Herman Van Springel (BEL)	Dr. Mann–Grundig	+ 12"
7	Willy In 't Ven (BEL)	Dr. Mann–Grundig	+ 4' 10"
8	Raymond Poulidor (FRA)	Fagor–Mercier–Hutchinson	+ 4' 10"
9	Italo Zilioli (ITA)	Faemino–Faema	+ 4' 10"
10	Lucien Van Impe (BEL)	Sonolor–Lejeune	+ 4' 10"
