= 1969 Liège–Bastogne–Liège =

Race details
- Dates: April 22, 1969
- Stages: 1
- Distance: 253 km (157 mi)
- Winning time: 6h 50'

Results
	Winner	Eddy Merckx (BEL)	(Faema)
	Second	Victor Van Schil (BEL)	(Faema)
	Third	Barry Hoban (GBR)	(Mercier–BP–Hutchinson)

The 55th running of Liège–Bastogne–Liège classic cycling race in Belgium was held on Thursday 22 April 1969. Eddy Merckx won the race, his first of five victories in the monument classic.

== Summary ==
Five riders were in an early breakaway, two of which were teammates of Eddy Merckx, the young Belgian who had already won every major classic in the spring of 1969, apart from Paris–Roubaix. At 98 km from the finish, Merckx broke clear from the pack on the Stockeu and combined with his two teammates Roger Swerts and Vic Van Schil in the front of the race. Swerts was dropped, and Merckx and Van Schil powered on to Liège, with Merckx doing most of the work. Merckx wanted to give the victory to his teammate, but Van Schil insisted Merckx should win. Britain's Barry Hoban won the sprint for third place, trailing eight minutes behind Merckx and Van Schil.

== Results ==
#	Rider	Time
1	(Belgium) Eddy Merckx	6h50'00"
2	(Belgium) Victor Van Schil	s.t.
3	(United Kingdom) Barry Hoban	+ 8'05"
4	(Belgium) Eric Leman	s.t.
5	(Netherlands) Wim Schepers	s.t.
6	(Belgium) Roger Swerts	s.t.
7	(Italy) Felice Gimondi	s.t.
8	(Belgium) Frans Verbeeck	s.t.
9	(Belgium) Herman Van Springel	s.t.
10	(Belgium) Willy In 't Ven	s.t.
