= 1977 Tour of Flanders =

- Event poster

Race details
- Dates: 3 April 1977
- Stages: 1
- Distance: 260 km (161.6 mi)
- Winning time: 6h 44' 00"

Results
	Winner	Roger De Vlaeminck (BEL)	(Brooklyn)
	Second	~~Freddy Maertens~~ (BEL)	(Flandria–Velda)
	Third	~~Walter Planckaert~~ (BEL)	(Maes–Miniflat)

The 61st running of the Tour of Flanders cycling race in Belgium was held on 3 April 1977. Belgian Roger De Vlaeminck won in a two-man sprint before Freddy Maertens, although the latter was later disqualified for an illegal bike change. The race started in Sint-Niklaas and finished in Meerbeke.

== Race Summary ==
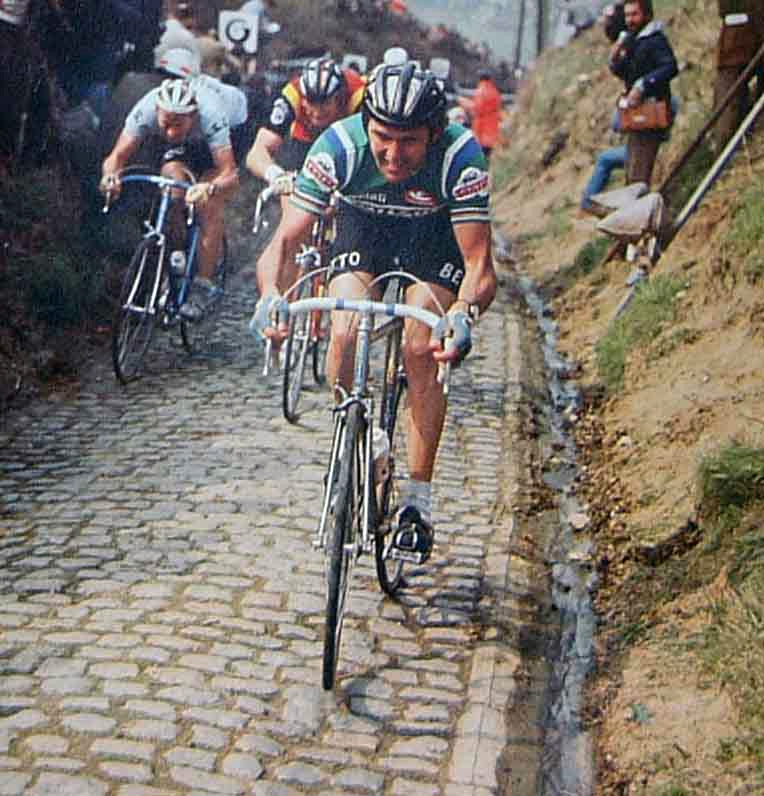
Roger De Vlaeminck on the Koppenberg

The race was one of the most peculiar in the history of the Tour of Flanders. Eddy Merckx, seeking a third win in his home classic, attacked early in the race and addressed the first climbs as frontrunner. Freddy Maertens punctured on the Koppenberg and was given a wheel by a spectator who pushed him all the way up. De Vlaeminck broke clear on the Koppenberg in pursuit of Merckx, but punctured shortly after and was caught by a returning Maertens. After the Taaienberg a three-man group with Belgian cycling icons De Vlaeminck, Maertens and Merckx was ahead of the peloton.

On the Varent climb, 70 km from the finish, a faltering Merckx was distanced by his companions and would not finish the race, spelling the end of his career. De Vlaeminck suddenly refused to work and cameras registered the two arguing. For the remaining 70 km Freddy Maertens rode to the finish with De Vlaeminck on his wheel and was easily beaten by the latter in the sprint. It was De Vlaeminck's first and only win in the classic. At two minutes, Walter Planckaert won the sprint for third place.

== Controversy ==
During the podium ceremony, De Vlaeminck was booed off stage by angry spectators who were displeased with his "cowardly" ride. The two protagonists made contradictory statements about what happened. Maertens stated that the judges had told him during the race he would be disqualified for his illegal wheel-change on the Koppenberg and that De Vlaeminck had offered him 300.000 francs to keep riding to the finish. De Vlaeminck denied this report, saying that he tactically stayed on Maertens' wheel for 70 km (43 mi), as he considered Maertens the better sprinter.

Days after the race, the controversy heightened even more, when news broke that Maertens and third-place finisher Walter Planckaert had tested positive for amphetamines and were both disqualified. Organizers decided to keep second and third place blank for this edition, unique in the Tour of Flanders' history.

== Climbs ==
There were eight categorized climbs in this edition:

- Oude Kwaremont
- Koppenberg
- Taaienberg
- Eikenberg
- Volkegemberg
- Varent
- Muur
- Bosberg

== Results ==
	Cyclist	Team	Time
1	Roger De Vlaeminck (BEL)	Brooklyn	6h 44' 00"
2	~~Freddy Maertens~~ (BEL)	Flandria–Velda	+ 2"
3	~~Walter Planckaert~~ (BEL)	Maes–Miniflat	+ 2' 00"
4	Walter Godefroot (BEL)	IJsboerke–Colnago	s.t.
5	Jan Raas (NED)	Frisol–Gazelle	s.t.
6	Francesco Moser (ITA)	Sanson	s.t.
7	Michel Pollentier (BEL)	Flandria–Velda	s.t.
8	Frans Verbeeck (BEL)	IJsboerke–Colnago	s.t.
9	Marc Demeyer (BEL)	Flandria–Velda	s.t.
10	Willy Planckaert (BEL)	Maes–Miniflat	s.t.
