= 1971 Paris–Roubaix =

Race details
- Dates: 18 April 1971
- Stages: 1
- Distance: 265.2 km (164.8 mi)
- Winning time: 6h 17' 53"

Results
	Winner	Roger Rosiers (BEL)	(Bic)
	Second	Herman Van Springel (BEL)	(Molteni)
	Third	Marino Basso (ITA)	(Molteni)

The 1971 Paris–Roubaix was the 69th edition of the Paris–Roubaix cycle race and was held on 18 April 1971. The race started in Compiègne and finished in Roubaix. The race was won by Roger Rosiers of the Bic team.

== General classification ==
Final general classification

Rank	Rider	Team	Time
1	Roger Rosiers (BEL)	Bic	6h 17' 53"
2	Herman Van Springel (BEL)	Molteni	+ 1' 26"
3	Marino Basso (ITA)	Molteni	+ 1' 26"
4	Jan Janssen (NED)	Bic	+ 1' 26"
5	Eddy Merckx (BEL)	Molteni	+ 1' 26"
6	Eric Leman (BEL)	Flandria–Mars	+ 1' 26"
7	Roger De Vlaeminck (BEL)	Flandria–Mars	+ 1' 26"
8	Felice Gimondi (ITA)	Salvarani	+ 1' 26"
9	Erik De Vlaeminck (BEL)	Flandria–Mars	+ 4' 26"
10	Georges Pintens (BEL)	Hertekamp–Magniflex–Novy	+ 4' 26"
