= 1969 UCI Road World Championships – Men's road race =

Men's Individual Road Race
1969 UCI Road World Championships
- Rainbow jersey

Race details
- Dates: 10 August 1969
- Stages: 1
- Distance: 262.86 km (163.3 mi)
- Winning time: 6h 23' 44"

Results
	Winner	Harm Ottenbros (NED)	(Netherlands)
	Second	Julien Stevens (BEL)	(Belgium)
	Third	Michele Dancelli (ITA)	(Italy)

The men's road race at the 1969 UCI Road World Championships was the 36th edition of the event. The race took place on Sunday 10 August 1969 in Zolder, Belgium. The race was won by Harm Ottenbros of the Netherlands.

== Final classification ==
General classification (1–10)

Rank	Rider	Time
1st place, gold medalist(s)	Harm Ottenbros (NED)	6h 23' 44"
2nd place, silver medalist(s)	Julien Stevens (BEL)	+ 0"
3rd place, bronze medalist(s)	Michele Dancelli (ITA)	+ 2' 18"
4	Guido Reybrouck (BEL)	+ 2' 21"
5	Roger Swerts (BEL)	+ 2' 21"
6	Jan Harings (NED)	+ 2' 21"
7	José Catieau (FRA)	+ 2' 21"
8	Enrico Paolini (ITA)	+ 2' 21"
9	Gerben Karstens (NED)	+ 2' 21"
10	Rolf Wolfshohl (FRG)	+ 2' 21"
