= 1968 Tour of Flanders =

52nd Tour of Flanders
Race details
- Dates: 30 March 1968
- Stages: 1
- Distance: 249 km (154.7 mi)
- Winning time: 5h 52'

Results
	Winner	Walter Godefroot (BEL)	(Flandria)
	Second	Rudi Altig (FRG)	(Salvarani)
	Third	Jan Janssen (NED)	(Pelforth–Sauvage–Lejeune)

The 52nd Tour of Flanders cycling classic was held on Saturday, 30 March 1968. The race was won by Belgian sprinter Walter Godefroot ahead of Guido Reybrouck, who was being led out by Eddy Merckx. After the race, Reybrouck tested positive for doping and Rudi Altig was promoted to second place. 82 of 175 riders finished.

== Route ==
The race started in Ghent and finished in Gentbrugge – covering 249 km. There were four categorized climbs:

- Kwaremont
- Kloosterstraat (Geraardsbergen)
- Valkenberg
- Kasteelstraat

== Results ==
Result
Rank	Rider	Team	Time
1	Walter Godefroot (BEL)	Flandria–De Clerck	5h 52' 00"
~~2~~	~~Guido Reybrouck~~ (BEL)	~~Romeo–Smiths~~	~~s.t.~~
2	Rudi Altig (FRG)	Salvarani	s.t.
3	Jan Janssen (NED)	Pelforth–Sauvage–Lejeune	s.t.
4	Daniel Van Ryckeghem (BEL)	Mann–Grundig–Libertas	s.t.
5	Roger Rosiers (BEL)	Mann–Grundig–Libertas	s.t.
6	Jo de Roo (NED)	Willem II–Gazelle	s.t.
7	Bernard Van de Kerckhove (BEL)	Pelforth–Sauvage–Lejeune	s.t.
8	Eddy Merckx (BEL)	Faema	s.t.
9	Ludo Vandromme (BEL)	Flandria–De Clerck	s.t.
10	Rik Van Looy (BEL)	Willem II–Gazelle	s.t.
