= 1971 Paris–Tours =

Race details
- Dates: 3 October 1971
- Stages: 1
- Distance: 285 km (177.1 mi)
- Winning time: 6h 59' 28"

Results
	Winner	Rik Van Linden (BEL)
	Second	Marino Basso (ITA)
	Third	Gerben Karstens (NED)

The 1971 Paris–Tours was the 65th edition of the Paris–Tours cycle race and was held on 3 October 1971. The race started in Paris and finished in Tours. The race was won by Rik Van Linden.

== General classification ==
Final general classification

Rank	Rider	Time
1	Rik Van Linden (BEL)	6h 59' 28"
2	Marino Basso (ITA)	+ 0"
3	Gerben Karstens (NED)	+ 0"
4	Walter Godefroot (BEL)	+ 0"
5	Cyrille Guimard (FRA)	+ 0"
6	Roger Swerts (BEL)	+ 0"
7	Frans Verbeeck (BEL)	+ 0"
8	Enzo Mattioda (FRA)	+ 0"
9	Jos van Beers (NED)	+ 0"
10	Robert Mintkiewicz (FRA)	+ 0"
