= 1971 Tour of Flanders =

Cycling race in Belgium

Race details
- Dates: 4 April 1971
- Stages: 1
- Distance: 268 km (166.5 mi)
- Winning time: 6h 12'

Results
	Winner	Evert Dolman (NED)	(Flandria–Mars)
	Second	Frans Kerremans (BEL)	(Hertekamp–Magniflex–Novy)
	Third	Cyrille Guimard (FRA)	(Fagor–Mercier–Hutchinson)

The 55th running of the Tour of Flanders cycling race in Belgium was held on Sunday 4 April 1971, and won by Dutchman Evert Dolman. It started in Ghent and finished in Gentbrugge, over a 268-km course. It was considered one of the weakest editions of the Tour of Flanders ever, causing organizers to restyle the route in subsequent years.

== Course ==
Eddy Merckx tried to break clear on the Kwaremont and the Muur, but was unable to make a decisive move. At 15 km from the finish, a group of 15 relative outsiders was formed. Evert Dolman, practically unknown, made an ultimate attack and finished two seconds ahead of the group. Frans Kerremans won the sprint for second place ahead of Cyrille Guimard.

== Climbs ==
There were eight categorized climbs:

- Kwaremont
- Kruisberg
- Edelareberg
- Stokstraat (Schorisse)
- Muur
- Bosberg
- Valkenberg
- Berg Hostellerie

== Results ==
	Cyclist	Team	Time
1	Evert Dolman (NED)	Flandria-Mars	6h 12'
2	Frans Kerremans (BEL)	Hertekamp–Magniflex–Novy	+ 2"
3	Cyrille Guimard (FRA)	Fagor–Mercier–Hutchinson	s.t.
4	Georges Van Coningsloo (BEL)	Molteni	s.t.
5	Frans Mintjens (BEL)	Molteni	s.t.
6	Jan Janssen (NED)	Bic	s.t.
7	Jan Krekels (NED)	Goudsmit–Hoff	s.t.
8	Tony Houbrechts (BEL)	Salvarani	s.t.
9	Ole Ritter (DEN)	Dreher	s.t.
10	Frans Maes (BEL)	Goldor	s.t.
