= 1972 Liège–Bastogne–Liège =

Race details
- Dates: 20 April 1972
- Stages: 1
- Distance: 239 km (149 mi)
- Winning time: 6h 33' 00"

Results
	Winner	Eddy Merckx (BEL)	(Molteni)
	Second	Wim Schepers (NED)	(Rokado–Colders)
	Third	Herman Van Springel (BEL)	(Molteni)

The 1972 Liège–Bastogne–Liège was the 58th edition of the Liège–Bastogne–Liège cycle race and was held on 20 April 1972. The race started and finished in Liège. The race was won by Eddy Merckx of the Molteni team.

== General classification ==
Final general classification

Rank	Rider	Team	Time
1	Eddy Merckx (BEL)	Molteni	6h 33' 00"
2	Wim Schepers (NED)	Rokado–Colders	+ 2' 40"
3	Herman Van Springel (BEL)	Molteni	+ 4' 35"
4	Roger Swerts (BEL)	Molteni	+ 5' 26"
5	Georges Pintens (BEL)	Van Cauter–Magniflex–de Gribaldy	+ 5' 26"
6	Leif Mortensen (DEN)	Bic	+ 5' 26"
7	Raymond Delisle (FRA)	Peugeot–BP–Michelin	+ 5' 26"
8	Gilbert Bellone (FRA)	Rokado–Colders	+ 6' 38"
9	Victor Van Schil (BEL)	Molteni	+ 6' 46"
10	Robert Bouloux (FRA)	Peugeot–BP–Michelin	+ 6' 46"
