= 1971 UCI Road World Championships – Men's road race =

Men's Individual Road Race
1971 UCI Road World Championships
- Rainbow jersey

Race details
- Dates: 5 September 1971
- Stages: 1
- Distance: 268.8 km (167.0 mi)
- Winning time: 6h 39' 06"

Results
	Winner	Eddy Merckx (BEL)	(Belgium)
	Second	Felice Gimondi (ITA)	(Italy)
	Third	Cyrille Guimard (FRA)	(France)

The men's road race at the 1971 UCI Road World Championships was the 38th edition of the event. The race took place on Sunday 5 September 1971 in Mendrisio, Switzerland. The race was won by Eddy Merckx of Belgium.

== Final classification ==
General classification (1–10)

Rank	Rider	Time
1st place, gold medalist(s)	Eddy Merckx (BEL)	6h 39' 06"
2nd place, silver medalist(s)	Felice Gimondi (ITA)	+ 0"
3rd place, bronze medalist(s)	Cyrille Guimard (FRA)	+ 1' 13"
4	Giancarlo Polidori (ITA)	+ 1' 13"
5	Georges Pintens (BEL)	+ 1' 13"
6	Leif Mortensen (DEN)	+ 1' 13"
7	Michele Dancelli (ITA)	+ 6' 51"
8	Frans Verbeeck (BEL)	+ 6' 51"
9	Ole Ritter (DEN)	+ 6' 51"
10	Roger Swerts (BEL)	+ 6' 51"
