= Michele Dancelli =

Italian cyclist (1942–2025)

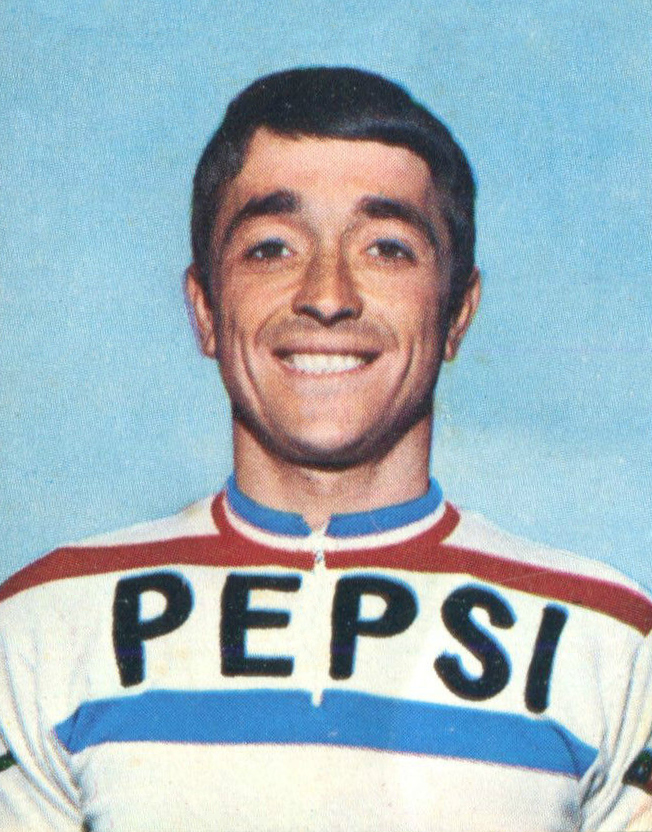
- Dancelli in 1968 or earlier

Personal information
- Born: 8 May 1942 Castenedolo, Italy
- Died: 18 December 2025 (aged 83) Castenedolo, Italy

Cycling career
- Sport: Cycling
- Discipline: Road
- Role: Rider

Professional teams
- 1963–1966: Molteni
- 1967–1968: Vittadello
- 1969–1970: Molteni
- 1971–1973: Scic
- 1974: Dreherforte
- 1976: G.B.C.–TV Color–Sony

Major wins
- Grand Tours Tour de France 1 individual stage (1969) Giro d'Italia 11 individual stages (1964, 1965, 1966, 1967, 1969, 1970) Stage races Tirreno–Adriatico (1971) Setmana Catalana de Ciclisme (1970) One-day races and Classics National Road Race Championships (1965, 1966) Milan–San Remo (1970) La Flèche Wallonne (1966) Trofeo Laigueglia (1968, 1970) Giro dell'Emilia (1967)
Medal record
Men's road bicycle racing
Representing Italy
World Championships
Bronze medal – third place	1968 Imola	Road race
Bronze medal – third place	1969 Zolder	Road race

Michele Dancelli (8 May 1942 – 18 December 2025) was an Italian road racing cyclist. His main victories include one Milan–San Remo (1970), the 1966 Flèche Wallonne, three editions of the Giro dell'Appennino (1965–1967), two Trofeo Laigueglia (1968 and 1970). He also won 11 stages in total in the Giro d'Italia and one stage in the 1969 Tour de France. Dancelli died on 18 December 2025, at the age of 83.

== Major results ==
1963
1st Road race, National Amateur Road Championships
3rd Giro di Lombardia
9th Giro dell'Emilia
1964
1st Gran Premio Industria e Commercio di Prato
1st Stage 2 Giro d'Italia
1st Corsa Coppi
1st Col San Martino
3rd Giro di Campania
4th Coppa Placci
6th Giro di Lombardia
1965
1st Road race, National Road Championships
1st Stages 1 & 5 Giro d'Italia
1st Giro del Veneto
1st Giro dell'Appennino
1st Grand Prix de Cannes
1st Gran Premio Industria e Commercio di Prato
1st Giro di Campania
1st GP Montelupo
1st Coppa Placci
1st Giro dell'Emilia
2nd Trofeo Baracchi
2nd Coppa Bernocchi
2nd Tre Valli Varesine
2nd Milano–Vignola
7th Giro di Lombardia
9th Overall Tour de Romandie

1st Stage 4

1966
1st Road race, National Road Championships
1st La Flèche Wallonne
1st Stage 18 Giro d'Italia
1st Giro del Lazio
1st Giro del Veneto
1st Giro dell'Appennino
1st Giro della Provincia di Reggio Calabria
1st Stage 7 Paris–Nice
1st Overall Cronostaffetta (TTT)
2nd Corsa Coppi
2nd Gran Premio Industria e Commercio di Prato
2nd Milano–Torino
3rd Genoa–Nice
3rd Coppa Bernocchi
4th Milan–San Remo
4th Tre Valli Varesine
5th Giro di Lombardia
6th Liège–Bastogne–Liège
6th GP Lugano
9th Overall Paris–Luxembourg
10th Giro di Romagna
1967
1st Coppa Sabatini
1st Giro dell'Appennino
1st Giro della Provincia di Reggio Calabria
1st Gran Premio Industria e Commercio di Prato
1st Stages 3 & 15 Giro d'Italia
1st Giro dell'Emilia
1st Corsa Coppi
2nd Road race, National Road Championships
2nd Coppa Bernocchi
2nd Coppa Placci
3rd Coppa Agostoni
3rd Trofeo Matteotti
3rd Giro delle Tre Provincie
4th GP Alghero
5th Overall Tirreno–Adriatico
7th Trofeo Laigueglia
8th Road race, UCI Road World Championships
1968
1st Overall Paris–Luxembourg

1st Stage 1

1st Giro della Provincia di Reggio Calabria
1st Trofeo Laigueglia
2nd Trofeo Matteotti
2nd Tre Valli Varesine
3rd Road race, UCI Road World Championships
3rd Road race, National Road Championships
3rd Milano–Torino
6th Overall Giro d'Italia
6th Overall Giro di Sardegna
6th Giro dell'Emilia
8th Overall Tour de Romandie

1st Stage 2

8th Giro di Lombardia
9th Overall Tirreno–Adriatico
1969
1st Stage 8b Tour de France
1st GP Cemab
1st Overall Cronostaffetta (TTT)

1st Stage 1c (ITT)

2nd Rund um den Henninger Turm
2nd Giro del Veneto
2nd Romana Lombardo
3rd Road race, UCI Road World Championships
4th Tre Valli Varesine
6th Overall Giro d'Italia

1st Stage 9

6th Tour of Flanders
10th Overall Tour de Romandie

1st Stage 4

1970
1st Milan–San Remo
1st Giro del Lazio
1st Trofeo Laigueglia
1st Prologue Tour de Luxembourg
3rd Giro dell'Emilia
4th Overall Giro d'Italia

1st Stages 11, 13, 14 & 18

4th Tre Valli Varesine
9th Giro di Lombardia
1971
1st Grand Prix de Saint-Raphaël
1st Stage 3b Giro di Sardegna
4th Giro di Romagna
5th Giro di Toscana
7th Road race, UCI Road World Championships
9th Gran Premio Città di Camaiore
1972
3rd Overall Tour de Suisse

1st Stages 4 & 6a

3rd Road race, National Road Championships
3rd Tre Valli Varesine
4th GP Alghero
5th Giro di Puglia
6th Road race, UCI Road World Championships
6th Milan–San Remo
7th Coppa Placci
7th Overall Giro di Sardegna
10th Giro di Lombardia
1973
2nd Giro di Romagna
2nd Giro di Sicilia
3rd Overall Giro di Puglia
3rd Giro dell'Appennino
3rd Giro delle Marche
8th Coppa Sabatini
8th Coppa Placci
10th Milano–Vignola
1974
8th Overall Giro di Sardegna
9th GP Cemab
