= Edelareberg =

Coordinates: 50.83266°N 3.62570°E

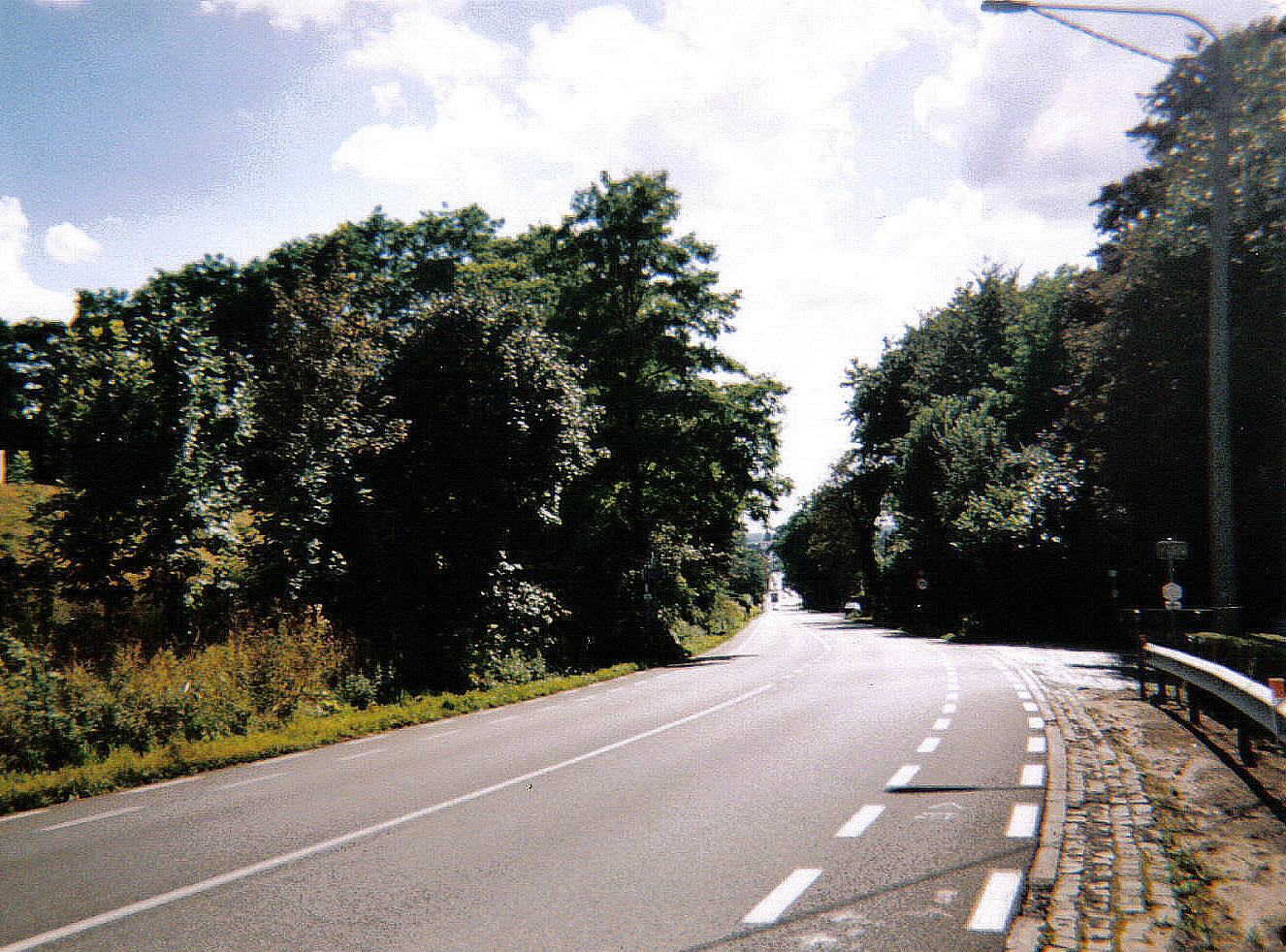
- Edelareberg from the base
- Location: Flanders, Belgium
- Start: Maarkedal
- Gain in altitude: 64 m (210 ft)
- Length of climb: 1.525 km (0.948 mi)
- Maximum elevation: 80 m (260 ft)
- Average gradient: 4.2 %
- Maximum gradient: 7 %

Edelareberg is a hill in Oudenaarde, in the Belgian province of East Flanders. With its top at 80 m, it is one of the many hill formations in the Flemish Ardennes. The top of the Edelareberg is in the village of Edelare, from which the hill takes its name. Colloquially, it is also called Kerselareberg, after Kerselare, the small hamlet which is now part of Edelare. The road was asphalted in the late 1960s and is now a broad and gently rising road, part of the N8 road connecting Oudenaarde and Brakel. The steepest slopes are 7% towards the top of the climb.

== Cycling ==
The hill is best known from cycling, as it is one of the many climbs in the Flemish Ardennes featuring in the spring classics. The climb has been included 35 times in the Tour of Flanders. In the early years of the race it was one of a classic trio of climbs, together with the Kwaremont and Kruisberg, called the dromedaries. The climb had a roughly-cobbled pavement with a sharp hairpin turn and a steep gradient at the end.

In 1970 the road was asphalted, and the hairpin and steepest part were leveled out. Ever since, the climb was less of a difficulty and lost its strategic importance in races. Subsequently it has not been included in the Tour of Flanders sinds 1973. In other races, such as Kuurne–Brussels–Kuurne, Nokere Koerse and the Three Days of De Panne, it still features regularly.
