= Eric Leman =

Belgian cyclist

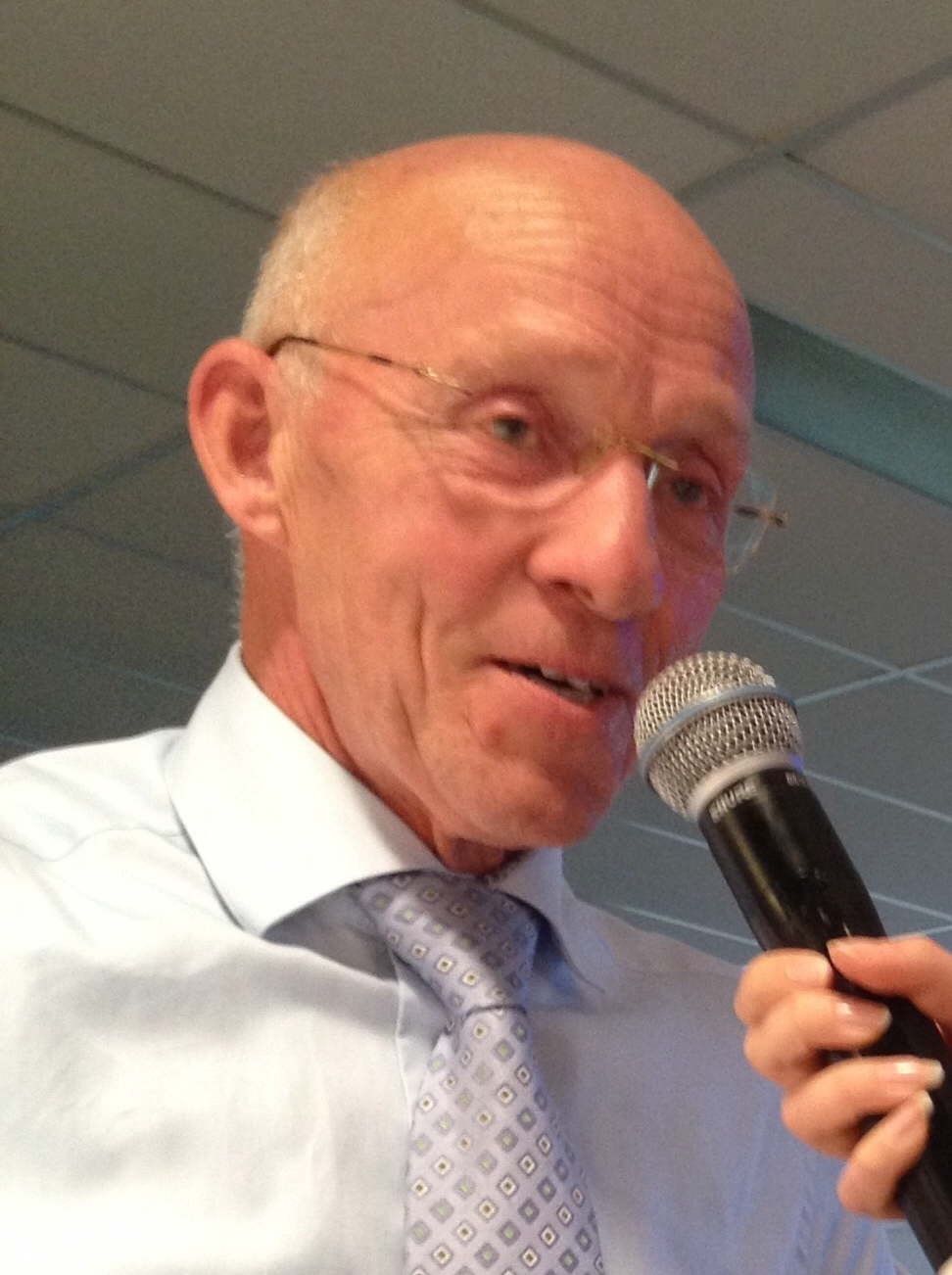
- Leman in 2015

Personal information
- Full name: Eric Leman
- Born: 17 July 1946 (age 80) Ledegem, Belgium

Cycling career
- Sport: Cycling
- Current team: Retired
- Discipline: Road
- Role: Rider
- Rider type: Classics specialist

Professional teams
- 1968–1971: Flandria
- 1972: Bic
- 1973: Peugeot–BP–Michelin
- 1974: MIC–Ludo–De Gribaldy
- 1975: Alsaver-Jeunet-De Gribaldy
- 1976: Zoppas–Splendor
- 1977: Carpenter-Splendor

Major wins
- Grand Tours Tour de France 5 individual stages (1968, 1969, 1971) Vuelta a España 1 individual stage (1974) One-day races and Classics Tour of Flanders (1970, 1972, 1973) Kuurne–Brussels–Kuurne (1968)

Eric Leman (born 17 July 1946) is a former professional road racing cyclist from West Flanders, Belgium. He won the prestigious Tour of Flanders three times.

== Major results ==
1968
1st Kuurne–Brussels–Kuurne
1st Porto–Lisboa
1st Stage 21 Tour de France
1st Stage 2 Four Days of Dunkirk
1969
1st Dwars door Vlaanderen
Vuelta a Andalucía

1st Stages 1, 2, 5 & 7

1st Stage 3 Tour de France
1st Stage 3 Paris–Nice
1970
1st Tour of Flanders
1st GP Briek Schotte
Vuelta a Andalucía

1st Stages 1 & 3b

1st Stage 4 Paris–Nice
1st Prologue Tour of Belgium
1971
1st Gullegem Koerse
1st Kampioenschap van Vlaanderen
1st Omloop der Vlaamse Ardennen
1st Omloop Mandel-Leie-Schelde
Tour de France

1st Stages 1a, 6a & 7

Critérium du Dauphiné Libéré

1st Stages 1a & 5a

Paris–Nice

1st Stages 1, 2a & 4

Vuelta a Andalucía

1st Prologue B & Stage 2

1972
1st Tour of Flanders
Paris–Nice

1st Stages 1 & 3

1st Stage 4 Four Days of Dunkirk
1st Stage 2 Tour of Belgium
1973
1st Tour of Flanders
1st Stage 2b Paris–Nice
1974
1st Stage 2 Vuelta a España
1st Stage 4 Paris–Nice
1975
1st Stage 1 Paris–Nice
1976
1st Omloop van Midden-Vlaanderen
1977
1st Stage 4 Vuelta a Aragón
