= Maes Pils (cycling team) =

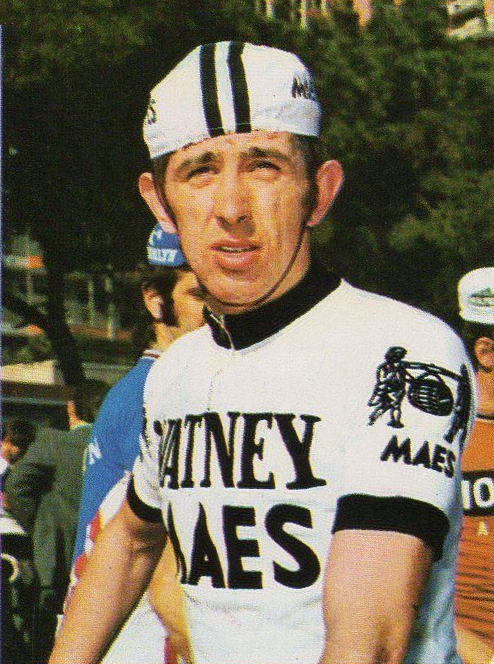
- Frans Verbeeck in 1973

Team information
- Registered: Belgium
- Founded: 1966
- Disbanded: 1977
- Discipline: Road
- Bicycles: Diamant (1966–1969); Groene Leeuw (1970–1977)

Team name history
- 1966 1967 1968 1969 1970 1971–1972 1973–1974 1975 1976 1977: Okay Whisky–Diamant; Okay Whisky–Diamant–De Torrens; Okay Whisky–Diamant–Simons; Okay Whisky–Diamant–Geens; Geens–Watney; Watney–Avia; Watney–Maes Pils; Maes Pils–Watney; Maes Pils–Rokado; Maes Pils–Mini-Flat
Maes Pils jersey
Jersey

Maes Pils was a Belgian professional cycling team that existed from 1966 to 1977. Its most notable result was Walter Planckaert's win of the 1976 Tour of Flanders.
