= Flandria (cycling team) =

Belgian professional cycling team (1957–1979)

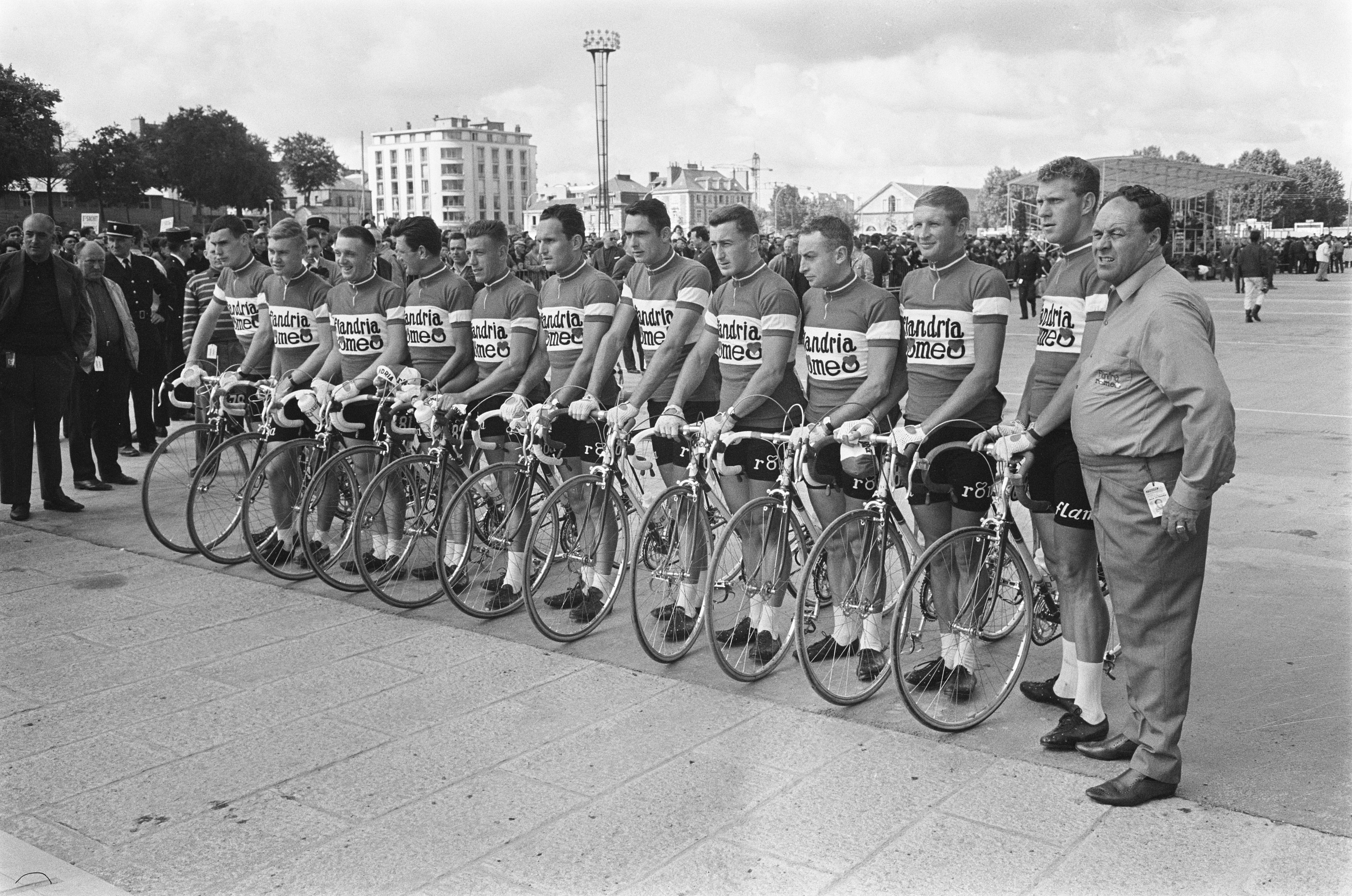
- The Flandria squad of the 1964 Tour de France

Team information
- Registered: Belgium
- Founded: 1957
- Disbanded: 1979
- Discipline: Road
- Status: UCI Division I

Key personnel
- General manager: Briek Schotte
- Team manager: Jean de Gribaldy

Team name history
- 1959 1960–1961 1962 1963 1964–1965 1966 1967–1968 1969 1970–1971 1972 1973 1974–1975 1976 1977 1978 1979: Flandria–Dr.Mann; Wiel's–Flandria; Flandria–Faema–Clément; Flandria–Faema; Flandria–Romeo; Flandria; Flandria–De Clerck; Flandria–De Clerck–Krüger; Flandria–Mars; Beaulieu–Flandria; Flandria–Carpenter–Shimano; Carpenter–Confortluxe–Flandria; Flandria–Velda–West Vlaams Vleesbedrijf; Flandria–Velda–Latina Assicurazioni; Flandria–Velda–Lano; Flandria–Ça va seul
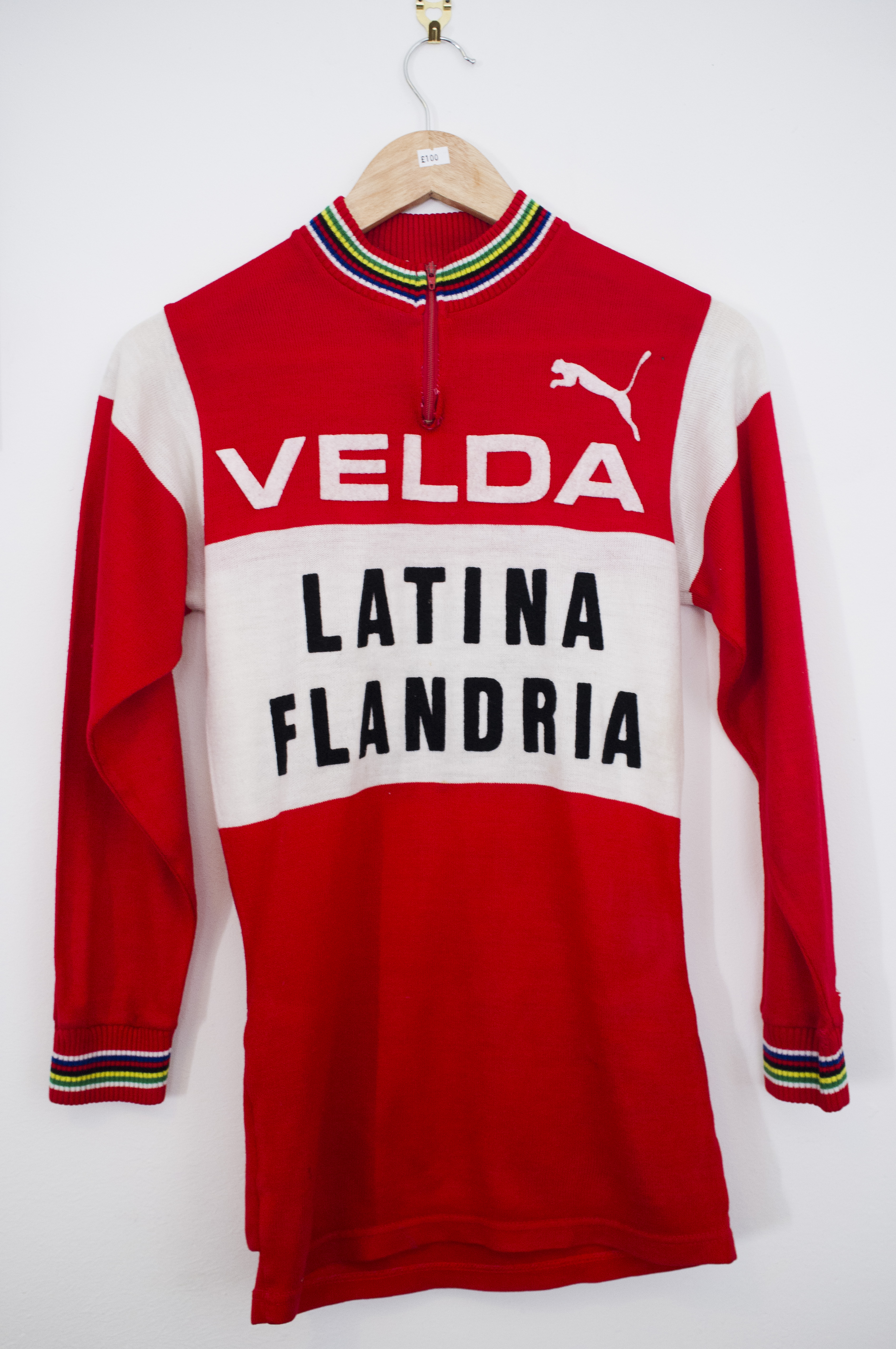
Flandria jersey
Jersey

Flandria was a Belgian professional cycling team that existed from 1957 to 1979. It was sponsored by Flandria a bicycle manufacturer located in West Flanders that also manufactures mopeds, lawnmowers, and motorbikes.

== History ==
Started with a team built around Joseph Planckaert, and Rik Van Looy. Youngsters Eddy Merckx, Peter Post, Herman Van Springel, and Walter Godefroot all joined at early stages of their career, although some such as Merckx left soon after to become leader of his own team.

After Van Looy's retirement, Belgian Freddy Maertens took over the leadership mantle, famous for his rivalry with Eddy Merckx. Irishman Sean Kelly also started his professional career with Flandria, as Maertens' super-domestique.

Joop Zoetemelk rode for the team from 1970-1972 finishing on the podium twice in the Tour de France during this span. He also finished 5th in the 1972 Tour de France and won the King of the Mountains classification in the 1971 Vuelta a España.

== Roster ==
Roster in 1975:

- Christian Ardouin (FRA)
- Eddy Cael (BEL)
- Raphaël Coene (BEL)
- Carlos Cuyle (BEL)
- Wilfried David (BEL)
- Ronald De Witte (BEL)
- Régis Delépine (FRA)
- Marc Demeyer (BEL)
- Robert Fontaine (BEL)
- Walter Godefroot (BEL)
- Cyrille Guimard (FRA)
- Eric Jacques (BEL)
- Freddy Maertens (BEL)
- Gerard Martens (BEL)
- Gérard Moneyron (FRA)
- Michel Pollentier (BEL)
- Jean-Jacques Sanquer (FRA)
- José Sersté (BEL)
- Roger Vandemaele (BEL)
- Arthur Van De Vijver (BEL)
- Marcel Van der Slagmolen (BEL)
- Julien Van Geebergen (BEL)
- Herman Van Springel (BEL)
- Daniel Verplancke (BEL)
- Roger Verschaeve (BEL)
