= List of teams and cyclists in the 1970 Vuelta a España =

For the 1970 Vuelta a España, the field consisted of 109 riders; 59 finished the race.

== By rider ==
Legend
No.	Starting number worn by the rider during the Vuelta
Pos.	Position in the general classification
DNF	Denotes a rider who did not finish

No.	Name	Nationality	Team	Pos.	Ref
2	Gerben Karstens	Netherlands	Peugeot–BP	DNS	
3	Georges Van Coningsloo	Belgium	Peugeot–BP	DNS	
4	Valère Van Sweevelt	Belgium	Peugeot–BP	DNS	
5	Jozef Schoeters	Belgium	Peugeot–BP	DNS	
6	Jean-Pierre Danguillaume	France	Peugeot–BP	DNS	
7	Billy Bilsland	Great Britain	Peugeot–BP	DNS	
8	Robert Bouloux	France	Peugeot–BP	DNS	
9	Charles Rouxel	France	Peugeot–BP	DNS	
10	Jean-Pierre Paranteau	France	Peugeot–BP	DNS	
11	Miguel Rodríguez	Spain	La Casera–Peña Bahamontes	DNF	
12	Joaquim Galera	Spain	La Casera–Peña Bahamontes	8	
13	Manuel Galera	Spain	La Casera–Peña Bahamontes	50	
14	Félix González	Spain	La Casera–Peña Bahamontes	DNF	
15	Miguel María Lasa	Spain	La Casera–Peña Bahamontes	7	
16	José Manuel Lasa	Spain	La Casera–Peña Bahamontes	14	
17	Jorge Mariné	Spain	La Casera–Peña Bahamontes	56	
18	José Antonio Pontón	Spain	La Casera–Peña Bahamontes	27	
19	José Manuel López Rodríguez	Spain	La Casera–Peña Bahamontes	47	
20	Sebastián Fernández Dueñas	Spain	La Casera–Peña Bahamontes	37	
21	Evert Dolman	Netherlands	Willem II–Gazelle	DNF	
22	Rini Wagtmans	Netherlands	Willem II–Gazelle	DNF	
23	Albert van Midden	Netherlands	Willem II–Gazelle	DNF	
24	Jos van der Vleuten	Netherlands	Willem II–Gazelle	38	
25	René Pijnen	Netherlands	Willem II–Gazelle	20	
26	Jan van Katwijk	Netherlands	Willem II–Gazelle	DNF	
27	Frits Hoogerheide	Netherlands	Willem II–Gazelle	58	
28	Herman Hoogzaad	Netherlands	Willem II–Gazelle	DNF	
29	Chris Pepels	Netherlands	Willem II–Gazelle	DNF	
30	Jan Serpenti	Netherlands	Willem II–Gazelle	51	
31	Jean-Claude Genty	France	Bic	46	
32	Michael Wright	Great Britain	Bic	39	
33	Sylvain Vasseur	France	Bic	52	
34	Luis Ocaña	Spain	Bic	1	
35	Anatole Novak	France	Bic	55	
36	Paul Crapez	France	Bic	DNF	
37	Roger Rosiers	Belgium	Bic	28	
38	Johny Schleck	Luxembourg	Bic	26	
39	Jesús Aranzabal	Spain	Bic	DNF	
40	Marc Sohet	France	Bic	42	
41	Jesús Manzaneque	Spain	Werner	4	
42	Ramón Sáez	Spain	Werner	40	
43	Luis-Pedro Santamarina	Spain	Werner	9	
44	Agustín Tamames	Spain	Werner	2	
45	José Gómez Lucas	Spain	Werner	29	
46	Luis Balagué	Spain	Werner	18	
47	Ventura Díaz	Spain	Werner	12	
48	José Grande	Spain	Werner	31	
49	Francisco Julia	Spain	Werner	34	
50	Manuel Mesa	Spain	Werner	33	
51	Raymond Steegmans	Belgium	Hertekamp–Magniflex	DNF	
52	Reinhold Van Den Bosch	Belgium	Hertekamp–Magniflex	DNF	
53	Theo Verschueren	Belgium	Hertekamp–Magniflex	DNF	
54	Roland Callewaert	Belgium	Hertekamp–Magniflex	DNF	
55	Ernie De Blaere	Belgium	Hertekamp–Magniflex	DNF	
56	Marc De Block	Belgium	Hertekamp–Magniflex	DNF	
57	Maurice Dury	Belgium	Hertekamp–Magniflex	DNF	
58	Jacques Zwaenepoel	Belgium	Hertekamp–Magniflex	DNF	
59	Eric Raes	Belgium	Hertekamp–Magniflex	DNF	
60	Jean Ronsmans	Belgium	Hertekamp–Magniflex	54	
61	Domingo Perurena	Spain	Fagor–Mercier	DNF	
62	José María Errandonea	Spain	Fagor–Mercier	35	
63	Rolf Wolfshohl	West Germany	Fagor–Mercier	DNF	
64	Bernard Labourdette	France	Fagor–Mercier	DNF	
65	Eddy Peelman	Belgium	Fagor–Mercier	DNF	
66	Edward Janssens	Belgium	Fagor–Mercier	44	
67	Henk Hiddinga	Netherlands	Fagor–Mercier	43	
68	Gérard Briend	France	Fagor–Mercier	DNF	
69	Léon-Paul Ménard	France	Fagor–Mercier	DNF	
70	Henri Rabaute	France	Fagor–Mercier	DNF	
71	Eduardo Castelló	Spain	Karpy	13	
72	Celerino Martinez	Spain	Karpy	DNF	
73	Juan Silloniz	Spain	Karpy	48	
74	Julián Cuevas	Spain	Karpy	36	
75	Juan Manuel Santisteban	Spain	Karpy	10	
76	José Albelda	Spain	Karpy	21	
77	José Manuel Fuente	Spain	Karpy	16	
78	Gonzalo Aja	Spain	Karpy	30	
79	Antonio Menéndez	Spain	Karpy	DNF	
80	Ángel Barrigón	Spain	Karpy	25	
81	Guido Reybrouck	Belgium	Germanvox–Wega	49	
82	Julien Van Lint	Belgium	Germanvox–Wega	DNF	
83	Paul In 't Ven	Belgium	Germanvox–Wega	DNF	
84	Giovanni Bramucci	Italy	Germanvox–Wega	DNF	
85	Dino Campitelli	Italy	Germanvox–Wega	DNF	
86	Giancarlo Toschi	Italy	Germanvox–Wega	DNF	
87	Celestino Vercelli	Italy	Germanvox–Wega	45	
88	Adriano Pella	Italy	Germanvox–Wega	DNF	
89	Domingo José Fernández	Spain	Germanvox–Wega	59	
90	Demetrio Martí	Spain	Germanvox–Wega	57	
91	Antonio Gómez del Moral	Spain	Kas	23	
92	Andrés Gandarias	Spain	Kas	15	
93	Carlos Echeverría	Spain	Kas	24	
94	Aurelio González	Spain	Kas	11	
95	Francisco Gabica	Spain	Kas	22	
96	Gabriel Mascaró	Spain	Kas	DNF	
97	Gabino Ereñozaga	Spain	Kas	DNF	
98	Francisco Galdós	Spain	Kas	6	
99	Nemesio Jiménez	Spain	Kas	32	
100	Vicente López Carril	Spain	Kas	17	
101	Herman Van Springel	Belgium	Mann–Grundig	3	
102	Tony Daelemans	Belgium	Mann–Grundig	DNF	
103	Willy In 't Ven	Belgium	Mann–Grundig	5	
104	Walter Boucquet	Belgium	Mann–Grundig	53	
105	André Poppe	Belgium	Mann–Grundig	19	
106	Michel L'Hoest	Belgium	Mann–Grundig	DNF	
107	Carmine Preziosi	Italy	Mann–Grundig	DNF	
108	Christian Callens	Belgium	Mann–Grundig	DNF	
109	René De Bie	Belgium	Mann–Grundig	41	
110	Jan Boonen	Belgium	Mann–Grundig	DNF	
