= 1970 Vuelta a España, Stage 10 to Stage 19b =

Cycling race stages

The 1970 Vuelta a España was the 25th edition of the Vuelta a España, one of cycling's Grand Tours. The Vuelta began in Cádiz, with a prologue individual time trial on 23 April, and Stage 10 occurred on 3 May with a stage from Igualada. The race finished in Bilbao on 12 May.

== Stage 10 ==
3 May 1970 - Igualada to Zaragoza, 237 km (147.3 mi)

Route:

Stage 10 result

Rank	Rider	Team	Time
1	Anatole Novak (FRA)	Bic	5h 37' 27"
2	Frits Hoogerheide (NED)	Willem II–Gazelle	+ 10"
3	Julien Van Lint (BEL)	Germanvox–Wega	+ 2' 10"
4	Marc Sohet (FRA)	Bic	+ 2' 16"
5	José María Errandonea (ESP)	Fagor–Mercier	+ 3' 01"
6	Guido Reybrouck (BEL)	Germanvox–Wega	s.t.
7	Ramón Sáez (ESP)	Werner	s.t.
8	Rini Wagtmans (NED)	Willem II–Gazelle	s.t.
9	Jean Ronsmans (BEL)	Hertekamp–Magniflex	s.t.
10	René Pijnen (NED)	Willem II–Gazelle	s.t.

General classification after Stage 10

Rank	Rider	Team	Time
1	Luis Ocaña (ESP)	Bic	48h 46' 32"
2	Miguel María Lasa (ESP)	La Casera–Peña Bahamontes	+ 8"
3	Herman Van Springel (BEL)	Mann–Grundig	s.t.
4	Agustín Tamames (ESP)	Werner	+ 9"
5	Luis-Pedro Santamarina (ESP)	Werner	+ 10"
6	José Manuel Lasa (ESP)	La Casera–Peña Bahamontes	+ 15"
7	Jesús Manzaneque (ESP)	Werner	+ 19"
8	Willy In 't Ven (BEL)	Mann–Grundig	+ 30"
9	Juan Manuel Santisteban (ESP)	Karpy	+ 31"
10	Bernard Labourdette (FRA)	Fagor–Mercier	+ 32"

== Stage 11 ==
4 May 1970 - Zaragoza to Calatayud, 118 km (73.3 mi)

Stage 11 result

Rank	Rider	Team	Time
1	Rini Wagtmans (NED)	Willem II–Gazelle	2h 52' 30"
2	Nemesio Jiménez (ESP)	Kas	+ 12"
3	Giovanni Bramucci (ITA)	Germanvox–Wega	+ 54"
4	Guido Reybrouck (BEL)	Germanvox–Wega	+ 1' 16"
5	René Pijnen (NED)	Willem II–Gazelle	s.t.
6	Miguel María Lasa (ESP)	La Casera–Peña Bahamontes	s.t.
7	Jean Ronsmans (BEL)	Hertekamp–Magniflex	s.t.
8	Jan Serpenti (NED)	Willem II–Gazelle	s.t.
9	Theo Verschueren (BEL)	Hertekamp–Magniflex	s.t.
10	Marc Sohet (FRA)	Bic	s.t.

General classification after Stage 11

Rank	Rider	Team	Time
1	Luis Ocaña (ESP)	Bic	
2	Miguel María Lasa (ESP)	La Casera–Peña Bahamontes	+ 8"
3	Herman Van Springel (BEL)	Mann–Grundig	s.t.
4	Agustín Tamames (ESP)	Werner	+ 9"
5	Luis-Pedro Santamarina (ESP)	Werner	+ 10"
6	José Manuel Lasa (ESP)	La Casera–Peña Bahamontes	
7	Jesús Manzaneque (ESP)	Werner	
8	Willy In 't Ven (BEL)	Mann–Grundig	+ 30"
9	Juan Manuel Santisteban (ESP)	Karpy	
10	Bernard Labourdette (FRA)	Fagor–Mercier	

== Stage 12 ==
5 May 1970 - Calatayud to Madrid, 205 km (127.4 mi)

Stage 12 result

Rank	Rider	Team	Time
1	Johny Schleck (LUX)	Bic	5h 40' 55"
2	Guido Reybrouck (BEL)	Germanvox–Wega	+ 12"
3	Juan Silloniz (ESP)	Karpy	+ 18"
4	José Gómez Lucas (ESP)	Werner	+ 22"
5	Evert Dolman (NED)	Willem II–Gazelle	s.t.
6	Jesús Manzaneque (ESP)	Werner	+ 33"
7	José Manuel Lasa (ESP)	La Casera–Peña Bahamontes	s.t.
8	Rini Wagtmans (NED)	Willem II–Gazelle	s.t.
9	José Antonio Pontón (ESP)	La Casera–Peña Bahamontes	s.t.
10	Julián Cuevas (ESP)	Karpy	s.t.

General classification after Stage 12

Rank	Rider	Team	Time
1	Luis Ocaña (ESP)	Bic	57h 21' 46"
2	Miguel María Lasa (ESP)	La Casera–Peña Bahamontes	+ 8"
3	Herman Van Springel (BEL)	Mann–Grundig	s.t.
4	Agustín Tamames (ESP)	Werner	+ 9"
5	Luis-Pedro Santamarina (ESP)	Werner	+ 10"
6	José Manuel Lasa (ESP)	La Casera–Peña Bahamontes	+ 20"
7	Jesús Manzaneque (ESP)	Werner	+ 24"
8	Willy In 't Ven (BEL)	Mann–Grundig	+ 30"
9	Juan Manuel Santisteban (ESP)	Karpy	+ 31"
10	Bernard Labourdette (FRA)	Fagor–Mercier	+ 33"

== Stage 13 ==
6 May 1970 - Madrid to Soria, 221 km (137 mi)

Route:

Stage 13 result

Rank	Rider	Team	Time
1	Rini Wagtmans (NED)	Willem II–Gazelle	5h 34' 15"
2	Henk Hiddinga (NED)	Fagor–Mercier	+ 1' 01"
3	José María Errandonea (ESP)	Fagor–Mercier	s.t.
4	Julián Cuevas (ESP)	Karpy	s.t.
5	Ramón Sáez (ESP)	Werner	+ 1' 05"
6	Roger Rosiers (BEL)	Bic	s.t.
7	René Pijnen (NED)	Willem II–Gazelle	s.t.
8	René De Bie (BEL)	Mann–Grundig	s.t.
9	Evert Dolman (NED)	Willem II–Gazelle	s.t.
10	Nemesio Jiménez (ESP)	Kas	s.t.

General classification after Stage 13

Rank	Rider	Team	Time
1	Agustín Tamames (ESP)	Werner	62h 57' 05"
2	Luis Ocaña (ESP)	Bic	+ 1"
3	Miguel María Lasa (ESP)	La Casera–Peña Bahamontes	+ 9"
4	Herman Van Springel (BEL)	Mann–Grundig	s.t.
5	Luis-Pedro Santamarina (ESP)	Werner	+ 11"
6	José Manuel Lasa (ESP)	La Casera–Peña Bahamontes	+ 16"
7	Jesús Manzaneque (ESP)	Werner	+ 20"
8	Willy In 't Ven (BEL)	Mann–Grundig	+ 31"
9	Juan Manuel Santisteban (ESP)	Karpy	+ 32"
10	Bernard Labourdette (FRA)	Fagor–Mercier	+ 33"

== Stage 14 ==
7 May 1970 - Soria to Valladolid, 238 km (148 mi)

Route:

Stage 14 result

Rank	Rider	Team	Time
1	Jan Serpenti (NED)	Willem II–Gazelle	6h 54' 08"
2	Guido Reybrouck (BEL)	Germanvox–Wega	+ 10"
3	Nemesio Jiménez (ESP)	Kas	s.t.
4	Jean Ronsmans (BEL)	Hertekamp–Magniflex	s.t.
5	Ramón Sáez (ESP)	Werner	+ 1' 05"
6	Julián Cuevas (ESP)	Karpy	s.t.
7	Giovanni Bramucci (ITA)	Germanvox–Wega	s.t.
8	Rini Wagtmans (NED)	Willem II–Gazelle	s.t.
9	René Pijnen (NED)	Willem II–Gazelle	s.t.
10	Demetrio Martí (ESP)	Germanvox–Wega	s.t.

General classification after Stage 14

Rank	Rider	Team	Time
1	Agustín Tamames (ESP)	Werner	69h 51' 33"
2	Luis Ocaña (ESP)	Bic	+ 1"
3	Miguel María Lasa (ESP)	La Casera–Peña Bahamontes	+ 9"
4	Herman Van Springel (BEL)	Mann–Grundig	s.t.
5	Luis-Pedro Santamarina (ESP)	Werner	+ 11"
6	José Manuel Lasa (ESP)	La Casera–Peña Bahamontes	+ 16"
7	Jesús Manzaneque (ESP)	Werner	+ 20"
8	Willy In 't Ven (BEL)	Mann–Grundig	+ 31"
9	Juan Manuel Santisteban (ESP)	Karpy	+ 32"
10	Bernard Labourdette (FRA)	Fagor–Mercier	+ 33"

== Stage 15 ==
8 May 1970 - Valladolid to Burgos, 134 km (83 mi)

Route:

Stage 15 result

Rank	Rider	Team	Time
1	Ramón Sáez (ESP)	Werner	3h 30' 06"
2	Jan Serpenti (NED)	Willem II–Gazelle	+ 10"
3	Jean Ronsmans (BEL)	Hertekamp–Magniflex	+ 16"
4	Guido Reybrouck (BEL)	Germanvox–Wega	+ 20"
5	Julián Cuevas (ESP)	Karpy	s.t.
6	Roger Rosiers (BEL)	Bic	s.t.
7	Jan van Katwijk (NED)	Willem II–Gazelle	s.t.
8	René De Bie (BEL)	Mann–Grundig	s.t.
9	Johny Schleck (LUX)	Bic	s.t.
10	Edward Janssens (BEL)	Fagor–Mercier	s.t.

General classification after Stage 15

Rank	Rider	Team	Time
1	Agustín Tamames (ESP)	Werner	72h 59' 59"
2	Luis Ocaña (ESP)	Bic	+ 1"
3	Miguel María Lasa (ESP)	La Casera–Peña Bahamontes	+ 9"
4	Herman Van Springel (BEL)	Mann–Grundig	s.t.
5	Luis-Pedro Santamarina (ESP)	Werner	+ 11"
6	José Manuel Lasa (ESP)	La Casera–Peña Bahamontes	+ 16"
7	Jesús Manzaneque (ESP)	Werner	+ 20"
8	Willy In 't Ven (BEL)	Mann–Grundig	+ 31"
9	Juan Manuel Santisteban (ESP)	Karpy	+ 32"
10	Bernard Labourdette (FRA)	Fagor–Mercier	+ 33"

== Stage 16 ==
9 May 1970 - Burgos to Santander, 179 km (111 mi)

Route:

Stage 16 result

Rank	Rider	Team	Time
1	Roger Rosiers (BEL)	Bic	4h 18' 08"
2	Miguel María Lasa (ESP)	La Casera–Peña Bahamontes	+ 11"
3	Agustín Tamames (ESP)	Werner	+ 17"
4	Herman Van Springel (BEL)	Mann–Grundig	+ 21"
5	Jean Ronsmans (BEL)	Hertekamp–Magniflex	s.t.
6	José Manuel Lasa (ESP)	La Casera–Peña Bahamontes	s.t.
7	Carlos Echeverría (ESP)	Kas	s.t.
8	José María Errandonea (ESP)	Fagor–Mercier	s.t.
9	Julián Cuevas (ESP)	Karpy	s.t.
10	Celestino Vercelli (ITA)	Germanvox–Wega	s.t.

General classification after Stage 16

Rank	Rider	Team	Time
1	Agustín Tamames (ESP)	Werner	77h 18' 24"
2	Miguel María Lasa (ESP)	La Casera–Peña Bahamontes	+ 3"
3	Luis Ocaña (ESP)	Bic	+ 5"
4	Herman Van Springel (BEL)	Mann–Grundig	+ 11"
5	Luis-Pedro Santamarina (ESP)	Werner	+ 13"
6	José Manuel Lasa (ESP)	La Casera–Peña Bahamontes	+ 20"
7	Jesús Manzaneque (ESP)	Werner	+ 24"
8	Willy In 't Ven (BEL)	Mann–Grundig	+ 35"
9	Juan Manuel Santisteban (ESP)	Karpy	+ 36"
10	José Antonio Pontón (ESP)	La Casera–Peña Bahamontes	+ 38"

== Stage 17 ==
10 May 1970 - Santander to Vitoria, 191 km (119 mi)

Route:

Stage 17 result

Rank	Rider	Team	Time
1	Willy In 't Ven (BEL)	Mann–Grundig	5h 24' 31"
2	Joaquim Galera (ESP)	La Casera–Peña Bahamontes	+ 11"
3	Agustín Tamames (ESP)	Werner	+ 23"
4	Herman Van Springel (BEL)	Mann–Grundig	+ 27"
5	Jesús Manzaneque (ESP)	Werner	s.t.
6	Aurelio González (ESP)	Kas	s.t.
7	Luis Ocaña (ESP)	Bic	s.t.
8	Francisco Galdós (ESP)	Kas	s.t.
9	Eduardo Castelló (ESP)	Karpy	s.t.
10	José Albelda (ESP)	Karpy	s.t.

General classification after Stage 17

Rank	Rider	Team	Time
1	Agustín Tamames (ESP)	Werner	82h 43' 18"
2	Luis Ocaña (ESP)	Bic	+ 9"
3	Willy In 't Ven (BEL)	Mann–Grundig	+ 12"
4	Herman Van Springel (BEL)	Mann–Grundig	+ 17"
5	Jesús Manzaneque (ESP)	Werner	+ 28"
6	Joaquim Galera (ESP)	La Casera–Peña Bahamontes	+ 39"
7	Francisco Galdós (ESP)	Kas	+ 50"
8	Eduardo Castelló (ESP)	Karpy	+ 51"
9	Miguel María Lasa (ESP)	La Casera–Peña Bahamontes	+ 1' 03"
10	Aurelio González (ESP)	Kas	+ 1' 05"

== Stage 18 ==
11 May 1970 - Vitoria to San Sebastián, 157 km (98 mi)

Route:

Stage 18 result

Rank	Rider	Team	Time
1	José María Errandonea (ESP)	Fagor–Mercier	3h 48' 40"
2	Frits Hoogerheide (NED)	Willem II–Gazelle	+ 2' 33"
3	Ramón Sáez (ESP)	Werner	+ 2' 46"
4	Miguel María Lasa (ESP)	La Casera–Peña Bahamontes	+ 2' 50"
5	Jean Ronsmans (BEL)	Hertekamp–Magniflex	s.t.
6	Johny Schleck (LUX)	Bic	s.t.
7	Nemesio Jiménez (ESP)	Kas	s.t.
8	Julián Cuevas (ESP)	Karpy	s.t.
9	Marc Sohet (FRA)	Bic	s.t.
10	José Manuel López Rodríguez (ESP)	La Casera–Peña Bahamontes	s.t.

== Stage 19a ==
12 May 1970 - San Sebastián to Llodio, 104 km (65 mi)

Route:

Stage 19a result

Rank	Rider	Team	Time
1	Jos van der Vleuten (NED)	Willem II–Gazelle	2h 38' 20"
2	René Pijnen (NED)	Willem II–Gazelle	+ 4' 07"
3	Juan Manuel Santisteban (ESP)	Karpy	+ 4' 12"
4	Guido Reybrouck (BEL)	Germanvox–Wega	+ 4' 43"
5	Jean Ronsmans (BEL)	Hertekamp–Magniflex	s.t.
6	Juan Silloniz (ESP)	Karpy	s.t.
7	José Manuel López Rodríguez (ESP)	La Casera–Peña Bahamontes	s.t.
8	Jan Serpenti (NED)	Willem II–Gazelle	s.t.
9	Julián Cuevas (ESP)	Karpy	s.t.
10	Ramón Sáez (ESP)	Werner	s.t.

== Stage 19b ==
12 May 1970 - Llodio to Bilbao, 29 km (18 mi) (individual time trial)

Route:

Stage 19b result

Rank	Rider	Team	Time
1	Luis Ocaña (ESP)	Bic	39' 24"
2	Jesús Manzaneque (ESP)	Werner	+ 1' 06"
3	Herman Van Springel (BEL)	Mann–Grundig	+ 1' 17"
4	Agustín Tamames (ESP)	Werner	+ 1' 25"
5	Willy In 't Ven (BEL)	Mann–Grundig	+ 1' 55"
6	Miguel María Lasa (ESP)	La Casera–Peña Bahamontes	s.t.
7	Francisco Galdós (ESP)	Kas	+ 2' 24"
8	Luis-Pedro Santamarina (ESP)	Werner	+ 2' 42"
9	Joaquim Galera (ESP)	La Casera–Peña Bahamontes	+ 2' 43"
10	Juan Manuel Santisteban (ESP)	Karpy	+ 3' 07"

General classification after Stage 19b

Rank	Rider	Team	Time
1	Luis Ocaña (ESP)	Bic	89h 57' 12"
2	Agustín Tamames (ESP)	Werner	+ 1' 18"
3	Herman Van Springel (BEL)	Mann–Grundig	+ 1' 27"
4	Jesús Manzaneque (ESP)	Werner	s.t.
5	Willy In 't Ven (BEL)	Mann–Grundig	+ 2' 00"
6	Francisco Galdós (ESP)	Kas	+ 3' 07"
7	Miguel María Lasa (ESP)	La Casera–Peña Bahamontes	+ 3' 09"
8	Joaquim Galera (ESP)	La Casera–Peña Bahamontes	+ 3' 15"
9	Luis-Pedro Santamarina (ESP)	Werner	+ 3' 50"
10	Juan Manuel Santisteban (ESP)	Karpy	+ 4' 15"
