= 1970 Vuelta a España, Prologue to Stage 9 =

Cycling race stages

The 1970 Vuelta a España was the 25th edition of the Vuelta a España, one of cycling's Grand Tours. The Vuelta began in Cádiz, with a prologue individual time trial on 23 April, and Stage 9 occurred on 2 May with a stage to Igualada. The race finished in Bilbao on 12 May.

== Prologue ==
23 April 1970 - Cádiz to Cádiz, 6 km (3.7 mi) (ITT)

Prologue result and General Classification after Prologue

	Rider	Team	Time
1	Luis Ocaña (ESP)	Bic	8' 37"
2	René Pijnen (NED)	Willem II–Gazelle	+ 1"
3	Herman Van Springel (BEL)	Mann–Grundig	+ 2"
4	José Manuel Lasa (ESP)	La Casera–Peña Bahamontes	+ 6"
5	José María Errandonea (ESP)	Fagor–Mercier	+ 7"
6	Miguel María Lasa (ESP)	La Casera–Peña Bahamontes	+ 9"
7	Jesús Manzaneque (ESP)	Werner	+ 10"
8	Jos van der Vleuten (NED)	Willem II–Gazelle	+ 11"
9	Juan Manuel Santisteban (ESP)	Karpy	s.t.
10	Roger Rosiers (BEL)	Bic	+ 14"

== Stage 1 ==
24 April 1970 - Cádiz to Jerez de la Frontera, 170 km (105.6 mi)

Route:

Stage 1 result

Rank	Rider	Team	Time
1	Eddy Peelman (BEL)	Fagor–Mercier	4h 25' 37"
2	Jean Ronsmans (BEL)	Hertekamp–Magniflex	+ 10"
3	Jan Serpenti (NED)	Willem II–Gazelle	+ 16"
4	Eric Raes (BEL)	Hertekamp–Magniflex	+ 20"
5	José Manuel Lasa (ESP)	La Casera–Peña Bahamontes	s.t.
6	Tony Daelemans (BEL)	Mann–Grundig	s.t.
7	Ramón Sáez (ESP)	Werner	s.t.
8	Roger Rosiers (BEL)	Bic	s.t.
9	René Pijnen (NED)	Willem II–Gazelle	s.t.
10	Rini Wagtmans (NED)	Willem II–Gazelle	s.t.

General classification after Stage 1

Rank	Rider	Team	Time
1	René Pijnen (NED)	Willem II–Gazelle	4h 34' 15"
2	Luis Ocaña (ESP)	Bic	s.t.
3	Herman Van Springel (BEL)	Mann–Grundig	+ 2"
4	José Manuel Lasa (ESP)	La Casera–Peña Bahamontes	+ 5"
5	José María Errandonea (ESP)	Fagor–Mercier	+ 6"
6	Miguel María Lasa (ESP)	La Casera–Peña Bahamontes	+ 8"
7	Jesús Manzaneque (ESP)	Werner	+ 9"
8	Jos van der Vleuten (NED)	Willem II–Gazelle	+ 11"
9	Juan Manuel Santisteban (ESP)	Karpy	+ 12"
10	Roger Rosiers (BEL)	Bic	+ 14"

== Stage 2 ==
25 April 1970 - Jerez de la Frontera to Fuengirola, 217 km (134.8 mi)

Route:

Stage 2 result

Rank	Rider	Team	Time
1	Julián Cuevas (ESP)	Karpy	5h 06' 51"
2	Ramón Sáez (ESP)	Werner	+ 10"
3	René Pijnen (NED)	Willem II–Gazelle	+ 16"
4	Evert Dolman (NED)	Willem II–Gazelle	+ 20"
5	Jan Serpenti (NED)	Willem II–Gazelle	s.t.
6	Jan van Katwijk (NED)	Willem II–Gazelle	s.t.
7	Rini Wagtmans (NED)	Willem II–Gazelle	s.t.
8	Juan Manuel Santisteban (ESP)	Karpy	s.t.
9	Christian Callens (BEL)	Mann–Grundig	s.t.
10	Eddy Peelman (BEL)	Fagor–Mercier	s.t.

General classification after Stage 2

Rank	Rider	Team	Time
1	René Pijnen (NED)	Willem II–Gazelle	9h 41' 22"
2	Luis Ocaña (ESP)	Bic	+ 4"
3	Herman Van Springel (BEL)	Mann–Grundig	+ 6"
4	Julián Cuevas (ESP)	Karpy	+ 9"
5	José Manuel Lasa (ESP)	La Casera–Peña Bahamontes	s.t.
6	José María Errandonea (ESP)	Fagor–Mercier	+ 10"
7	Ramón Sáez (ESP)	Werner	+ 11"
8	Miguel María Lasa (ESP)	La Casera–Peña Bahamontes	+ 12"
9	Jesús Manzaneque (ESP)	Werner	+ 13"
10	Jos van der Vleuten (NED)	Willem II–Gazelle	+ 15"

== Stage 3 ==
26 April 1970 - Fuengirola to Almería, 249 km (155 mi)

Route:

Stage 3 result

Rank	Rider	Team	Time
1	Guido Reybrouck (BEL)	Germanvox–Wega	6h 47' 00"
2	Eddy Peelman (BEL)	Fagor–Mercier	+ 10"
3	Michael Wright (GBR)	Bic	+ 16"
4	Roger Rosiers (BEL)	Bic	+ 20"
5	René Pijnen (NED)	Willem II–Gazelle	s.t.
6	Ramón Sáez (ESP)	Werner	s.t.
7	José Manuel Lasa (ESP)	La Casera–Peña Bahamontes	s.t.
8	Christian Callens (BEL)	Mann–Grundig	s.t.
9	José Manuel López Rodríguez (ESP)	La Casera–Peña Bahamontes	s.t.
10	Miguel María Lasa (ESP)	La Casera–Peña Bahamontes	s.t.

General classification after Stage 3

Rank	Rider	Team	Time
1	René Pijnen (NED)	Willem II–Gazelle	16h 28' 42"
2	Luis Ocaña (ESP)	Bic	+ 4"
3	Herman Van Springel (BEL)	Mann–Grundig	+ 6"
4	Julián Cuevas (ESP)	Karpy	+ 9"
5	José Manuel Lasa (ESP)	La Casera–Peña Bahamontes	s.t.
6	José María Errandonea (ESP)	Fagor–Mercier	+ 10"
7	Ramón Sáez (ESP)	Werner	+ 11"
8	Miguel María Lasa (ESP)	La Casera–Peña Bahamontes	+ 12"
9	Jesús Manzaneque (ESP)	Werner	s.t.
10	Jos van der Vleuten (NED)	Willem II–Gazelle	s.t.

== Stage 4 ==
27 April 1970 - Almería to Lorca, 161 km (100 mi)

Route:

Stage 4 result

Rank	Rider	Team	Time
1	Jean Ronsmans (BEL)	Hertekamp–Magniflex	4h 02' 11"
2	Raymond Steegmans (BEL)	Hertekamp–Magniflex	+ 10"
3	Ramón Sáez (ESP)	Werner	+ 16"
4	Eddy Peelman (BEL)	Fagor–Mercier	+ 20"
5	Guido Reybrouck (BEL)	Germanvox–Wega	s.t.
6	Roger Rosiers (BEL)	Bic	s.t.
7	René Pijnen (NED)	Willem II–Gazelle	s.t.
8	Rolf Wolfshohl (FRA)	Fagor–Mercier	s.t.
9	Miguel María Lasa (ESP)	La Casera–Peña Bahamontes	s.t.
10	Demetrio Martí (ESP)	Germanvox–Wega	s.t.

== Stage 5 ==
28 April 1970 - Lorca to Calp, 209 km (130 mi)

Route:

Stage 5 result

Rank	Rider	Team	Time
1	Luis-Pedro Santamarina (ESP)	Werner	5h 15' 26"
2	Jean Ronsmans (BEL)	Hertekamp–Magniflex	+ 10"
3	Raymond Steegmans (BEL)	Hertekamp–Magniflex	+ 16"
4	Roger Rosiers (BEL)	Bic	+ 20"
5	Guido Reybrouck (BEL)	Germanvox–Wega	s.t.
6	Nemesio Jiménez (ESP)	Kas	s.t.
7	Eddy Peelman (BEL)	Fagor–Mercier	s.t.
8	Eric Raes (BEL)	Hertekamp–Magniflex	s.t.
9	Marc Sohet (FRA)	Bic	s.t.
10	Ramón Sáez (ESP)	Werner	s.t.

General classification after Stage 5

Rank	Rider	Team	Time
1	René Pijnen (NED)	Willem II–Gazelle	25h 54' 12"
2	Luis-Pedro Santamarina (ESP)	Werner	+ 4"
3	Luis Ocaña (ESP)	Bic	s.t.
4	Herman Van Springel (BEL)	Mann–Grundig	+ 6"
5	Ramón Sáez (ESP)	Werner	+ 7"
6	Julián Cuevas (ESP)	Karpy	+ 9"
7	José Manuel Lasa (ESP)	La Casera–Peña Bahamontes	s.t.
8	José María Errandonea (ESP)	Fagor–Mercier	+ 10"
9	Miguel María Lasa (ESP)	La Casera–Peña Bahamontes	+ 12"
10	Jesús Manzaneque (ESP)	Werner	+ 13"

== Stage 6 ==
29 April 1970 - Calp to Borriana, 198 km (123 mi)

Route:

Stage 6 result

Rank	Rider	Team	Time
1	Eddy Peelman (BEL)	Fagor–Mercier	4h 02' 11"
2	Jean Ronsmans (BEL)	Hertekamp–Magniflex	+ 10"
3	René Pijnen (NED)	Willem II–Gazelle	+ 16"
4	Guido Reybrouck (BEL)	Germanvox–Wega	+ 20"
5	Julián Cuevas (ESP)	Karpy	s.t.
6	Jan van Katwijk (NED)	Willem II–Gazelle	s.t.
7	Rini Wagtmans (NED)	Willem II–Gazelle	s.t.
8	Miguel María Lasa (ESP)	La Casera–Peña Bahamontes	s.t.
9	Evert Dolman (NED)	Willem II–Gazelle	s.t.
10	Johny Schleck (LUX)	Bic	s.t.

General classification after Stage 6

Rank	Rider	Team	Time
1	René Pijnen (NED)	Willem II–Gazelle	29h 56' 39"
2	Luis-Pedro Santamarina (ESP)	Werner	+ 8"
3	Luis Ocaña (ESP)	Bic	s.t.
4	Herman Van Springel (BEL)	Mann–Grundig	+ 10"
5	Ramón Sáez (ESP)	Werner	+ 11"
6	Julián Cuevas (ESP)	Karpy	+ 13"
7	José Manuel Lasa (ESP)	La Casera–Peña Bahamontes	s.t.
8	José María Errandonea (ESP)	Fagor–Mercier	+ 14"
9	Miguel María Lasa (ESP)	La Casera–Peña Bahamontes	+ 16"
10	Jesús Manzaneque (ESP)	Werner	+ 17"

== Stage 7 ==
30 April 1970 - Borriana to Tarragona, 201 km (125 mi)

Route:

Stage 7 result

Rank	Rider	Team	Time
1	Guido Reybrouck (BEL)	Germanvox–Wega	4h 52' 04"
2	Jean Ronsmans (BEL)	Hertekamp–Magniflex	+ 10"
3	Eddy Peelman (BEL)	Fagor–Mercier	+ 16"
4	José Manuel López Rodríguez (ESP)	La Casera–Peña Bahamontes	+ 20"
5	Rini Wagtmans (NED)	Willem II–Gazelle	s.t.
6	Theo Verschueren (BEL)	Hertekamp–Magniflex	s.t.
7	Ramón Sáez (ESP)	Werner	s.t.
8	René De Bie (BEL)	Mann–Grundig	s.t.
9	Evert Dolman (NED)	Willem II–Gazelle	s.t.
10	Michael Wright (GBR)	Bic	s.t.

General classification after Stage 7

Rank	Rider	Team	Time
1	René Pijnen (NED)	Willem II–Gazelle	34h 49' 03"
2	Luis-Pedro Santamarina (ESP)	Werner	+ 9"
3	Luis Ocaña (ESP)	Bic	s.t.
4	Herman Van Springel (BEL)	Mann–Grundig	+ 10"
5	Ramón Sáez (ESP)	Werner	+ 11"
6	Julián Cuevas (ESP)	Karpy	+ 13"
7	José Manuel Lasa (ESP)	La Casera–Peña Bahamontes	s.t.
8	José María Errandonea (ESP)	Fagor–Mercier	+ 14"
9	Miguel María Lasa (ESP)	La Casera–Peña Bahamontes	+ 16"
10	Guido Reybrouck (BEL)	Germanvox–Wega	+ 17"

== Stage 8a ==
1 May 1970 - Tarragona to Barcelona, 100 km (62 mi)

Route:

Stage 8a result

Rank	Rider	Team	Time
1	Ramón Sáez (ESP)	Werner	2h 18' 26"
2	Eddy Peelman (BEL)	Fagor–Mercier	+ 5"
3	Julián Cuevas (ESP)	Karpy	+ 10"
4	José María Errandonea (ESP)	Fagor–Mercier	s.t.
5	Rini Wagtmans (NED)	Willem II–Gazelle	s.t.
6	Guido Reybrouck (BEL)	Germanvox–Wega	s.t.
7	José Gómez Lucas (ESP)	Werner	s.t.
8	Jean Ronsmans (BEL)	Hertekamp–Magniflex	s.t.
9	Rolf Wolfshohl (FRA)	Fagor–Mercier	s.t.
10	Sylvain Vasseur (FRA)	Bic	s.t.

== Stage 8b ==
1 May 1970 - Barcelona to Barcelona, 48 km (30 mi)

Route:

Stage 8b result

Rank	Rider	Team	Time
1	Guido Reybrouck (BEL)	Germanvox–Wega	53' 28"
2	René Pijnen (NED)	Willem II–Gazelle	+ 5"
3	Jean Ronsmans (BEL)	Hertekamp–Magniflex	+ 8"
4	Ramón Sáez (ESP)	Werner	+ 10"
5	Julián Cuevas (ESP)	Karpy	s.t.
6	Rini Wagtmans (NED)	Willem II–Gazelle	s.t.
7	Sylvain Vasseur (FRA)	Bic	s.t.
8	Celestino Vercelli (ITA)	Germanvox–Wega	s.t.
9	José Gómez Lucas (ESP)	Werner	s.t.
10	José Manuel Lasa (ESP)	La Casera–Peña Bahamontes	s.t.

General classification after Stage 8b

Rank	Rider	Team	Time
1	René Pijnen (NED)	Willem II–Gazelle	38h 01' 12"
2	Ramón Sáez (ESP)	Werner	+ 6"
3	Guido Reybrouck (BEL)	Germanvox–Wega	+ 12"
4	Luis-Pedro Santamarina (ESP)	Werner	+ 13"
5	Luis Ocaña (ESP)	Bic	s.t.
6	Herman Van Springel (BEL)	Mann–Grundig	+ 15"
7	Julián Cuevas (ESP)	Karpy	+ 16"
8	José Manuel Lasa (ESP)	La Casera–Peña Bahamontes	+ 18"
9	José María Errandonea (ESP)	Fagor–Mercier	+ 19"
10	Miguel María Lasa (ESP)	La Casera–Peña Bahamontes	+ 21"

== Stage 9 ==
2 May 1970 - Barcelona to Igualada, 189 km (117 mi)

Route:

Stage 9 result

Rank	Rider	Team	Time
1	Agustín Tamames (ESP)	Werner	5h 04' 31"
2	Miguel María Lasa (ESP)	La Casera–Peña Bahamontes	+ 10"
3	Herman Van Springel (BEL)	Mann–Grundig	+ 16"
4	Luis Ocaña (ESP)	Bic	+ 20"
5	Jesús Manzaneque (ESP)	Werner	s.t.
6	Luis-Pedro Santamarina (ESP)	Werner	s.t.
7	José Manuel Fuente (ESP)	Karpy	s.t.
8	Bernard Labourdette (FRA)	Fagor–Mercier	s.t.
9	José Antonio Pontón (ESP)	La Casera–Peña Bahamontes	s.t.
10	Luis Balagué (ESP)	Werner	s.t.

General classification after Stage 9

Rank	Rider	Team	Time
1	Luis Ocaña (ESP)	Bic	43h 06' 06"
2	Miguel María Lasa (ESP)	La Casera–Peña Bahamontes	+ 8"
3	Herman Van Springel (BEL)	Mann–Grundig	s.t.
4	Agustín Tamames (ESP)	Werner	+ 9"
5	Luis-Pedro Santamarina (ESP)	Werner	+ 10"
6	José Manuel Lasa (ESP)	La Casera–Peña Bahamontes	+ 15"
7	Jesús Manzaneque (ESP)	Werner	+ 19"
8	Willy In 't Ven (BEL)	Mann–Grundig	+ 30"
9	Juan Manuel Santisteban (ESP)	Karpy	+ 31"
10	Bernard Labourdette (FRA)	Fagor–Mercier	+ 32"
