= List of teams and cyclists in the 1971 Vuelta a España =

For the 1971 Vuelta a España, the field consisted of 110 riders; 68 finished the race.

== By rider ==
Legend
No.	Starting number worn by the rider during the Vuelta
Pos.	Position in the general classification
Time	Deficit to the winner of the general classification
DNF	Denotes a rider who did not finish

No.	Name	Nationality	Team	Pos.	Time	Ref
1	Luis Ocaña	Spain	Bic	3	+ 1' 01"	
2	René Pijnen	Netherlands	Bic	28	+ 15' 49"	
3	Marc Sohet	Belgium	Bic	DNF	—	
4	Roger Rosiers	Belgium	Bic	DNF	—	
5	Johny Schleck	Luxembourg	Bic	DNF	—	
6	Désiré Letort	France	Bic	26	+ 15' 25"	
7	Bernard Labourdette	France	Bic	17	+ 11' 09"	
8	Sylvain Vasseur	France	Bic	64	+ 1h 14' 41"	
9	Jesús Aranzabal	Spain	Bic	33	+ 20' 28"	
10	Anatole Novak	France	Bic	DNF	—	
11	Raymond Poulidor	France	Fagor–Mercier	9	+ 6' 01"	
12	Cyrille Guimard	France	Fagor–Mercier	12	+ 8' 33"	
13	Gerard Vianen	Netherlands	Fagor–Mercier	49	+ 43' 05"	
14	Georges Chappe	France	Fagor–Mercier	61	+ 1h 01' 35"	
15	Eddy Peelman	Belgium	Fagor–Mercier	DNF	—	
16	Jacques Cadiou	France	Fagor–Mercier	DNF	—	
17	Régis Delépine	France	Fagor–Mercier	DNF	—	
18	Jean-Pierre Genet	France	Fagor–Mercier	46	+ 38' 28"	
19	René Grelin	France	Fagor–Mercier	47	+ 41' 25"	
20	Rolf Wolfshohl	West Germany	Fagor–Mercier	20	+ 13' 00"	
21	Andrés Oliva	Spain	La Casera–Peña Bahamontes	22	+ 13' 58"	
22	Jesús Esperanza	Spain	La Casera–Peña Bahamontes	DNF	—	
23	Juan Zurano	Spain	La Casera–Peña Bahamontes	42	+ 34' 40"	
24	Germán Martín Sáez	Spain	La Casera–Peña Bahamontes	DNF	—	
25	Eufronio Enrique Sahagún Santos	Spain	La Casera–Peña Bahamontes	13	+ 9' 41"	
26	José Luis Abilleira	Spain	La Casera–Peña Bahamontes	25	+ 14' 46"	
27	Dámaso Torres Cruces	Spain	La Casera–Peña Bahamontes	48	+ 42' 35"	
28	Antonio Menéndez	Spain	La Casera–Peña Bahamontes	14	+ 9' 54"	
29	Francisco Sánchez Muñoz	Spain	La Casera–Peña Bahamontes	DNF	—	
30	José María Errandonea	Spain	La Casera–Peña Bahamontes	DNF	—	
31	Willy Planckaert	Belgium	Goldor	DNF	—	
32	Frans Van De Walle	Belgium	Goldor	DNF	—	
33	Hendrik Marien	Belgium	Goldor	67	+ 1h 23' 38"	
34	Walter Planckaert	Belgium	Goldor	DNF	—	
35	Franky Ebo	Belgium	Goldor	60	+ 1h 01' 03"	
36	Bernard Van de Kerckhove	Belgium	Goldor	DNF	—	
37	Hubert Hutsebaut	Belgium	Goldor	DNF	—	
38	Eric Raes	Belgium	Goldor	DNF	—	
39	Willy Scheers	Belgium	Goldor	68	+ 1h 25' 10"	
40	Christian Brasseur	Belgium	Goldor	DNF	—	
41	José Manuel Fuente	Spain	Kas	54	+ 54' 17"	
42	Francisco Gabica	Spain	Kas	35	+ 22' 29"	
43	Nemesio Jiménez	Spain	Kas	32	+ 19' 51"	
44	Domingo Perurena	Spain	Kas	16	+ 10' 28"	
45	José Antonio González	Spain	Kas	DNF	—	
46	Carlos Pedro Jovellar Fernández	Spain	Kas	DNF	—	
47	José Pesarrodona	Spain	Kas	DNF	—	
48	Gabriel Mascaró Febrer	Spain	Kas	DNF	—	
49	Gregorio San Miguel	Spain	Kas	DNF	—	
50	José Luis Uribezubia	Spain	Kas	27	+ 15' 41"	
51	Harry Steevens	Netherlands	Goudsmit–Hoff	DNF	—	
52	Jan Krekels	Netherlands	Goudsmit–Hoff	DNF	—	
53	Leo Duyndam	Netherlands	Goudsmit–Hoff	DNF	—	
54	Gerben Karstens	Netherlands	Goudsmit–Hoff	39	+ 29' 10"	
55	Wim Prinsen	Netherlands	Goudsmit–Hoff	40	+ 30' 15"	
56	Jan van Katwijk	Netherlands	Goudsmit–Hoff	DNF	—	
57	Piet Rentmeester	Netherlands	Goudsmit–Hoff	59	+ 58' 48"	
58	Wim Schepers	Netherlands	Goudsmit–Hoff	15	+ 10' 19"	
59	Henk Benjamins	Netherlands	Goudsmit–Hoff	DNF	—	
60	Ger Harings	Netherlands	Goudsmit–Hoff	DNF	—	
61	José Manuel López	Spain	Werner	38	+ 26' 58"	
62	Luis Santamarina	Spain	Werner	50	+ 47' 25"	
63	Agustín Tamames	Spain	Werner	7	+ 5' 15"	
64	Ventura Díaz	Spain	Werner	18	+ 11' 32"	
65	José Gómez	Spain	Werner	24	+ 14' 26"	
66	Ramón Sáez Marzo	Spain	Werner	53	+ 51' 27"	
67	Luis Balagué	Spain	Werner	10	+ 6' 17"	
68	José Antonio Pontón Ruiz	Spain	Werner	DNF	—	
69	Antonio Martos Aguilar	Spain	Werner	8	+ 5' 45"	
70	José Grande Sánchez	Spain	Werner	43	+ 36' 08"	
71	Antonio Gómez del Moral	Spain	Karpy	21	+ 13' 15"	
72	Gonzalo Aja	Spain	Karpy	19	+ 12' 05"	
73	Juan Andrés Esnaola Gutiérrez	Spain	Karpy	62	+ 1h 06' 14"	
74	José Albelda Tormo	Spain	Karpy	65	+ 1h 17' 53"	
75	Eduardo Castelló	Spain	Karpy	23	+ 13' 58"	
76	Juan Manuel Santisteban	Spain	Karpy	DNF	—	
77	Joaquim Galera	Spain	Karpy	34	+ 22' 28"	
78	Julián Cuevas González	Spain	Karpy	41	+ 32' 44"	
79	Juan Cariñena Garrigo	Spain	Karpy	66	+ 1h 18' 20"	
80	Manuel Galera Magdelano	Spain	Karpy	5	+ 2' 37"	
81	Gérard Besnard	France	Peugeot–BP	DNF	—	
82	Billy Bilsland	Great Britain	Peugeot–BP	DNF	—	
83	Jean-Pierre Danguillaume	France	Peugeot–BP	31	+ 19' 11"	
84	Ronald De Witte	Belgium	Peugeot–BP	29	+ 18' 35"	
85	Ferdinand Bracke	Belgium	Peugeot–BP	1	73h 50' 05"	
86	Wilfried David	Belgium	Peugeot–BP	2	+ 59"	
87	Walter Godefroot	Belgium	Peugeot–BP	30	+ 18' 36"	
88	Jean-Pierre Paranteau	France	Peugeot–BP	51	+ 50' 21"	
89	Bernard Thévenet	France	Peugeot–BP	44	+ 36' 59"	
90	Charles Rouxel	France	Peugeot–BP	56	+ 55' 12"	
91	Gabino Ereñozaga Lejarreta	Spain	Orbea–Legnano	57	+ 57' 18"	
92	Angel Barrigon Argumusa	Spain	Orbea–Legnano	52	+ 51' 13"	
93	Salvador Canet García	Spain	Orbea–Legnano	DNF	—	
94	Miguel María Lasa	Spain	Orbea–Legnano	4	+ 2' 18"	
95	Demetrio Martí Luján	Spain	Orbea–Legnano	DNF	—	
96	Enrique Sanchidrián Pacho	Spain	Orbea–Legnano	DNF	—	
97	José Martínez Esterlich	Spain	Orbea–Legnano	63	+ 1h 12' 03"	
98	Antonio Ayestarán Beain	Spain	Orbea–Legnano	DNF	—	
99	Manuel Trenco Bomboi	Spain	Orbea–Legnano	DNF	—	
100	Félix González	Spain	Orbea–Legnano	DNF	—	
101	Evert Dolman	Netherlands	Flandria–Mars	36	+ 25' 18"	
102	Joop Zoetemelk	Netherlands	Flandria–Mars	6	+ 2' 48"	
103	Edy Schütz	Luxembourg	Flandria–Mars	11	+ 6' 39"	
104	Gérard David	Belgium	Flandria–Mars	45	+ 38' 12"	
105	Willy In 't Ven	Belgium	Flandria–Mars	DNF	—	
106	Edward Janssens	Belgium	Flandria–Mars	58	+ 58' 32"	
107	Tino Tabak	Netherlands	Flandria–Mars	37	+ 26' 24"	
108	Karl-Heinz Muddemann	West Germany	Flandria–Mars	55	+ 54' 22"	
109	Victor Nuelant	Belgium	Flandria–Mars	DNF	—	
110	Roger Loysch	Belgium	Flandria–Mars	DNF	—	
