= List of teams and cyclists in the 1972 Vuelta a España =

For the 1972 Vuelta a España, the field consisted of 100 riders; 57 finished the race.

== By rider ==
Legend
No.	Starting number worn by the rider during the Vuelta
Pos.	Position in the general classification
Time	Deficit to the winner of the general classification
DNF	Denotes a rider who did not finish

No.	Name	Nationality	Team	Pos.	Time	Ref
1	Rini Wagtmans	Netherlands	Goudsmit–Hoff	DNF	—	
2	Ger Harings	Netherlands	Goudsmit–Hoff	52	+ 1h 43' 36"	
3	Gerard Vianen	Netherlands	Goudsmit–Hoff	36	+ 46' 52"	
4	Wim Prinsen	Netherlands	Goudsmit–Hoff	38	+ 51' 01"	
5	Jos van der Vleuten	Netherlands	Goudsmit–Hoff	32	+ 36' 41"	
6	Jan Krekels	Netherlands	Goudsmit–Hoff	55	+ 1h 50' 16"	
7	Jan van Katwijk	Netherlands	Goudsmit–Hoff	57	+ 2' 03' 07"	
8	Cees Koeken	Netherlands	Goudsmit–Hoff	56	+ 1h 57' 22"	
9	Harrie van Leeuwen	Netherlands	Goudsmit–Hoff	DNF	—	
10	Karel Delnoy	Netherlands	Goudsmit–Hoff	50	+ 1h 27' 13"	
11	José Manuel López	Spain	Werner	34	+ 43' 14"	
12	Agustín Tamames	Spain	Werner	3	+ 7' 00"	
13	Luis Santamarina	Spain	Werner	27	+ 29' 36"	
14	José Gómez	Spain	Werner	DNF	—	
15	José Grande Sánchez	Spain	Werner	43	+ 1h 04' 42"	
16	Luis Balagué	Spain	Werner	45	+ 1h 06' 35"	
17	Ventura Díaz	Spain	Werner	14	+ 10' 47"	
18	José Luis Uribezubia	Spain	Werner	16	+ 11' 22"	
19	José Antonio Pontón Ruiz	Spain	Werner	DNF	—	
20	Manuel Blanco Garea	Spain	Werner	15	+ 10' 55"	
21	Claudio Michelotto	Italy	GBC–Sony	48	+ 1h 23' 15"	
22	Dino Zandegù	Italy	GBC–Sony	DNF	—	
23	Silvano Schiavon	Italy	GBC–Sony	24	+ 24' 36"	
24	Aldo Moser	Italy	GBC–Sony	39	+ 58' 16"	
25	Diego Moser	Italy	GBC–Sony	41	+ 1h 02' 46"	
26	Mario Nicoletti	Italy	GBC–Sony	DNF	—	
27	Silvano Davo	Italy	GBC–Sony	DNF	—	
28	Cipriano Chemello	Italy	GBC–Sony	DNF	—	
29	Mario Lanzafame	Italy	GBC–Sony	49	+ 1h 24' 42"	
30	Selvino Poloni	Italy	GBC–Sony	DNF	—	
31	Walter Planckaert	Belgium	Watney–Avia	DNF	—	
32	Willy Van Malderghem	Belgium	Watney–Avia	DNF	—	
33	Eddy Verstraeten	Belgium	Watney–Avia	DNF	—	
34	Marcel Omloop	Belgium	Watney–Avia	DNF	—	
35	Etienne Antheunis	Belgium	Watney–Avia	DNF	—	
36	Englebert Opdebeeck	Belgium	Watney–Avia	DNF	—	
37	Luc Van Goidsenhoven	Belgium	Watney–Avia	DNF	—	
38	Gustaaf Van Roosbroeck	Belgium	Watney–Avia	DNF	—	
39	Michel Coulon	Belgium	Watney–Avia	DNF	—	
40	Pieter Nassen	Belgium	Watney–Avia	DNF	—	
41	Juan Zurano	Spain	La Casera–Peña Bahamontes	17	+ 12' 46"	
42	José Luis Abilleira	Spain	La Casera–Peña Bahamontes	22	+ 18' 11"	
43	Jesús Esperanza	Spain	La Casera–Peña Bahamontes	33	+ 42' 10"	
44	Germán Martín Sáez	Spain	La Casera–Peña Bahamontes	37	+ 47' 55"	
45	Félix González	Spain	La Casera–Peña Bahamontes	29	+ 31' 54"	
46	Ramón Sáez Marzo	Spain	La Casera–Peña Bahamontes	DNF	—	
47	Andrés Oliva	Spain	La Casera–Peña Bahamontes	11	+ 10' 03"	
48	Eufronio Enrique Sahagún Santos	Spain	La Casera–Peña Bahamontes	20	+ 17' 42"	
49	Pedro Torres	Spain	La Casera–Peña Bahamontes	31	+ 33' 55"	
50	Dámaso Torres Cruces	Spain	La Casera–Peña Bahamontes	DNF	—	
51	Rik Van Linden	Belgium	Van Cauter–Magniflex–de Gribaldy	DNF	—	
52	Joaquim Agostinho	Portugal	Van Cauter–Magniflex–de Gribaldy	DNF	—	
53	Guido Van Sweevelt	Belgium	Van Cauter–Magniflex–de Gribaldy	DNF	—	
54	Sigfrido Fontanelli	Italy	Van Cauter–Magniflex–de Gribaldy	DNF	—	
55	Silvano Ravagli	Italy	Van Cauter–Magniflex–de Gribaldy	46	+ 1h 08' 47"	
56	Roger Kindt	Belgium	Van Cauter–Magniflex–de Gribaldy	54	+ 1h 49' 09"	
57	Mauro Vannucchi	Italy	Van Cauter–Magniflex–de Gribaldy	DNF	—	
58	Vittorio Adorni	Italy	Van Cauter–Magniflex–de Gribaldy	DNF	—	
59	Fabrizio Fabbri	Italy	Van Cauter–Magniflex–de Gribaldy	DNF	—	
60	Pietro Dallai	Italy	Van Cauter–Magniflex–de Gribaldy	40	+ 59' 59"	
61	Bernard Labourdette	France	Bic	10	+ 8' 54"	
62	Jean-Claude Genty	France	Bic	DNF	—	
63	Daniel Ducreux	France	Bic	DNF	—	
64	Désiré Letort	France	Bic	9	+ 8' 42"	
65	Leif Mortensen	Denmark	Bic	23	+ 20' 26"	
66	René Pijnen	Netherlands	Bic	DNF	—	
67	Johny Schleck	Luxembourg	Bic	26	+ 29' 13"	
68	Jesús Aranzabal	Spain	Bic	42	+ 1h 02' 53"	
69	Anatole Novak	France	Bic	DNF	—	
70	Francis Campaner	France	Bic	DNF	—	
71	Hendrik Marien	Belgium	Goldor–IJsboerke	DNF	—	
72	Willy Planckaert	Belgium	Goldor–IJsboerke	DNF	—	
73	Hubert Hutsebaut	Belgium	Goldor–IJsboerke	DNF	—	
74	Alfons Scheys	Belgium	Goldor–IJsboerke	53	+ 1h 46' 00"	
75	Emile Cambré	Belgium	Goldor–IJsboerke	DNF	—	
76	Fernand Hermie	Belgium	Goldor–IJsboerke	DNF	—	
77	Willy Scheers	Belgium	Goldor–IJsboerke	51	+ 1h 35' 19"	
78	Tony Gakens	Belgium	Goldor–IJsboerke	DNF	—	
79	George Claes	Belgium	Goldor–IJsboerke	DNF	—	
80	August Herijgers	Belgium	Goldor–IJsboerke	DNF	—	
81	José Manuel Fuente	Spain	Kas	1	82h 34' 14"	
82	Francisco Galdós	Spain	Kas	18	+ 13' 44"	
83	José Antonio González	Spain	Kas	5	+ 8' 08"	
84	Santiago Lazcano	Spain	Kas	19	+ 15' 07"	
85	Miguel María Lasa	Spain	Kas	2	+ 6' 34"	
86	Vicente López Carril	Spain	Kas	12	+ 10' 08"	
87	Jesús Manzaneque	Spain	Kas	7	+ 8' 27"	
88	Domingo Perurena	Spain	Kas	6	+ 8' 23"	
89	José Pesarrodona	Spain	Kas	8	+ 8' 38"	
90	Nemesio Jiménez	Spain	Kas	44	+ 1h 06' 07"	
91	Eduardo Castelló	Spain	Karpy	13	+ 10' 33"	
92	Antonio Gómez del Moral	Spain	Karpy	30	+ 33' 40"	
93	Antonio Menéndez	Spain	Karpy	25	+ 28' 50"	
94	Gonzalo Aja	Spain	Karpy	4	+ 8' 07"	
95	Antonio Alcón González	Spain	Karpy	28	+ 31' 45"	
96	Julián Cuevas González	Spain	Karpy	DNF	—	
97	José Albelda Tormo	Spain	Karpy	47	+ 1h 11' 48"	
98	José Manuel Fernandez	Spain	Karpy	DNF	—	
99	José Manuel Mesa Fernández	Spain	Karpy	35	+ 43' 37"	
100	Juan Manuel Valls Allegre	Spain	Karpy	21	+ 17' 53"	
