= 1971 Tour de France, Prologue to Stage 9 =

Cycling race stages

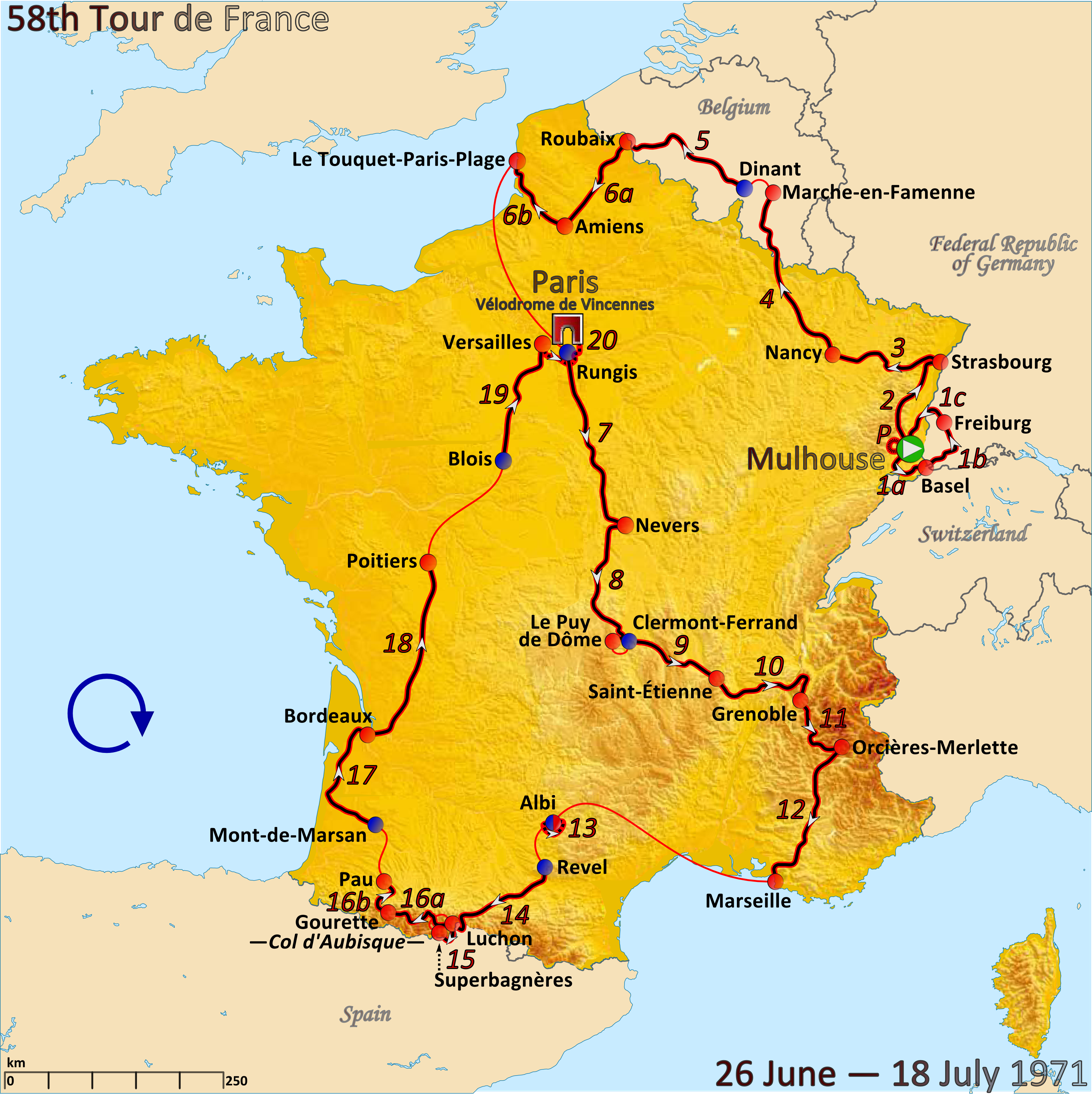
Route of the 1971 Tour de France

The 1971 Tour de France was the 58th edition of the Tour de France, one of cycling's Grand Tours. The Tour began in Mulhouse with a prologue team time trial on 26 June, and Stage 9 occurred on 6 July with a mountainous stage to Saint-Étienne. The race finished in Paris on 18 July.

== Prologue ==
26 June 1971 - Mulhouse to Mulhouse, 11 km (6.8 mi) (TTT)

Prologue result and general classification after prologue

Rank	Team	Time
1	Molteni	1h 05' 16"
2	Ferretti	+ 1' 48"
3	Flandria–Mars	+ 2' 16"
4	Bic	+ 2' 23"
5	Peugeot–BP–Michelin	+ 3' 02"
6	Salvarani	+ 3' 11"
7	Goudsmit–Hoff	+ 3' 15"
8	Sonolor–Lejeune	+ 3' 24"
9	Scic	+ 3' 42"
10	Kas–Kaskol	+ 3' 44"

== Stage 1a ==
27 June 1971 - Mulhouse to Basel, 59.5 km (37.0 mi)

Stage 1a result

Rank	Rider	Team	Time
1	Eric Leman (BEL)	Flandria–Mars	1h 24' 36"
2	Walter Godefroot (BEL)	Peugeot–BP–Michelin	s.t.
3	Guido Reybrouck (BEL)	Salvarani	s.t.
4	Gerben Karstens (NED)	Goudsmit–Hoff	s.t.
5	Roger De Vlaeminck (BEL)	Flandria–Mars	s.t.
6	Cyrille Guimard (FRA)	Fagor–Mercier–Hutchinson	s.t.
7	Jan Krekels (NED)	Goudsmit–Hoff	s.t.
8	Roger Swerts (BEL)	Molteni	s.t.
9	Pieter Nassen (BEL)	Flandria–Mars	s.t.
10	Albert Van Vlierberghe (BEL)	Ferretti	s.t.

General classification after stage 1a

Rank	Rider	Team	Time
1	Marinus Wagtmans (NED)	Molteni	1h 24' 16"
2	Jos Huysmans (BEL)	Molteni	s.t.
3	Eddy Merckx (BEL)	Molteni	s.t.
4	Victor Van Schil (BEL)	Molteni	s.t.
5	Frans Mintjens (BEL)	Molteni	s.t.
6	Julien Stevens (BEL)	Molteni	s.t.
7	Edward Janssens (BEL)	Flandria–Mars	+ 7"
8	Albert Van Vlierberghe (BEL)	Ferretti	+ 10"
9	Gösta Pettersson (SWE)	Ferretti	s.t.
10	Pietro Campagnari (ITA)	Ferretti	s.t.

== Stage 1b ==
27 June 1971 - Basel to Freiburg, 90 km (56 mi)

Stage 1b result

Rank	Rider	Team	Time
1	Gerben Karstens (NED)	Goudsmit–Hoff	2h 28' 26"
2	Roger De Vlaeminck (BEL)	Flandria–Mars	s.t.
3	Walter Godefroot (BEL)	Peugeot–BP–Michelin	s.t.
4	Cyrille Guimard (FRA)	Fagor–Mercier–Hutchinson	s.t.
5	Jos Huysmans (BEL)	Molteni	s.t.
6	Enrico Paolini (ITA)	Scic	s.t.
7	José Gómez Lucas (ESP)	Werner	s.t.
8	Tino Tabak (NED)	Flandria–Mars	s.t.
9	Rolf Wolfshohl (FRG)	Fagor–Mercier–Hutchinson	s.t.
10	Jan Krekels (NED)	Goudsmit–Hoff	s.t.

General classification after stage 1b

Rank	Rider	Team	Time
1	Eddy Merckx (BEL)	Molteni	3h 52' 37"
2	Herman Van Springel (BEL)	Molteni	+ 4"
3	Jos Huysmans (BEL)	Molteni	+ 5"
4	Victor Van Schil (BEL)	Molteni	s.t.
5	Albert Van Vlierberghe (BEL)	Ferretti	+ 15"
6	Gösta Pettersson (SWE)	Ferretti	s.t.
7	Pietro Campagnari (ITA)	Ferretti	s.t.
8	Roger De Vlaeminck (BEL)	Flandria–Mars	+ 20"
9	Tino Tabak (NED)	Flandria–Mars	s.t.
10	Erik De Vlaeminck (BEL)	Flandria–Mars	s.t.

== Stage 1c ==
27 June 1971 - Freiburg to Mulhouse, 74.5 km (46.3 mi)

Stage 1c result

Rank	Rider	Team	Time
1	Albert Van Vlierberghe (BEL)	Ferretti	1h 43' 32"
2	Erik De Vlaeminck (BEL)	Flandria–Mars	s.t.
3	Enrico Paolini (ITA)	Scic	s.t.
4	Cyrille Guimard (FRA)	Fagor–Mercier–Hutchinson	s.t.
5	Gerben Karstens (NED)	Goudsmit–Hoff	s.t.
6	Guido Reybrouck (BEL)	Salvarani	s.t.
7	Roger De Vlaeminck (BEL)	Flandria–Mars	s.t.
8	Jan Krekels (NED)	Goudsmit–Hoff	s.t.
9	Walter Godefroot (BEL)	Peugeot–BP–Michelin	s.t.
10	Albert Fritz (FRG)	Hoover–de Gribaldy–Wolber	s.t.

General classification after stage 1c

Rank	Rider	Team	Time
1	Eddy Merckx (BEL)	Molteni	5h 36' 10"
2	Herman Van Springel (BEL)	Molteni	+ 5"
3	Albert Van Vlierberghe (BEL)	Ferretti	+ 6"
4	Jos Huysmans (BEL)	Molteni	s.t.
5	Victor Van Schil (BEL)	Molteni	s.t.
6	Erik De Vlaeminck (BEL)	Flandria–Mars	+ 13"
7	Gösta Pettersson (SWE)	Ferretti	+ 16"
8	Barry Hoban (GBR)	Sonolor–Lejeune	+ 21"
9	Roger De Vlaeminck (BEL)	Flandria–Mars	s.t.
10	Tino Tabak (NED)	Flandria–Mars	s.t.

== Stage 2 ==
28 June 1971 - Mulhouse to Strasbourg, 144 km (89 mi)

Stage 2 result

Rank	Rider	Team	Time
1	Eddy Merckx (BEL)	Molteni	3h 05' 27"
2	Roger De Vlaeminck (BEL)	Flandria–Mars	s.t.
3	Herman Van Springel (BEL)	Molteni	s.t.
4	Joop Zoetemelk (NED)	Flandria–Mars	s.t.
5	Gianni Motta (ITA)	Salvarani	s.t.
6	Tino Tabak (NED)	Flandria–Mars	s.t.
7	Enrico Paolini (ITA)	Scic	s.t.
8	Christian Raymond (FRA)	Peugeot–BP–Michelin	s.t.
9	Gösta Pettersson (SWE)	Ferretti	s.t.
10	Luis Ocaña (ESP)	Bic	s.t.

General classification after stage 2

Rank	Rider	Team	Time
1	Eddy Merckx (BEL)	Molteni	8h 41' 16"
2	Herman Van Springel (BEL)	Molteni	+ 21"
3	Roger De Vlaeminck (BEL)	Flandria–Mars	+ 32"
4	Gösta Pettersson (SWE)	Ferretti	+ 37"
5	Tino Tabak (NED)	Flandria–Mars	+ 42"
6	Enrico Paolini (ITA)	Scic	s.t.
7	Joop Zoetemelk (NED)	Flandria–Mars	s.t.
8	Gianni Motta (ITA)	Salvarani	+ 44"
9	Leif Mortensen (DEN)	Bic	+ 47"
10	Luis Ocaña (ESP)	Bic	s.t.

== Stage 3 ==
29 June 1971 - Strasbourg to Nancy, 165.5 km (102.8 mi)

Stage 3 result

Rank	Rider	Team	Time
1	Marinus Wagtmans (NED)	Molteni	4h 14' 21"
2	Barry Hoban (GBR)	Sonolor–Lejeune	s.t.
3	Nemesio Jiménez (ESP)	Kas–Kaskol	s.t.
4	Jean-Pierre Genet (FRA)	Fagor–Mercier–Hutchinson	s.t.
5	Willy Van Neste (BEL)	Flandria–Mars	s.t.
6	Pietro Guerra (ITA)	Salvarani	s.t.
7	Victor Van Schil (BEL)	Molteni	s.t.
8	Wilfried David (BEL)	Peugeot–BP–Michelin	s.t.
9	Mauro Simonetti (ITA)	Ferretti	s.t.
10	Jean-Claude Genty (FRA)	Bic	s.t.

General classification after stage 3

Rank	Rider	Team	Time
1	Eddy Merckx (BEL)	Molteni	12h 58' 06"
2	Herman Van Springel (BEL)	Molteni	+ 21"
3	Roger De Vlaeminck (BEL)	Flandria–Mars	+ 32"
4	Gösta Pettersson (SWE)	Ferretti	+ 37"
5	Tino Tabak (NED)	Flandria–Mars	+ 42"
6	Enrico Paolini (ITA)	Scic	s.t.
7	Joop Zoetemelk (NED)	Flandria–Mars	s.t.
8	Gianni Motta (ITA)	Salvarani	+ 44"
9	Leif Mortensen (DEN)	Bic	+ 47"
10	Luis Ocaña (ESP)	Bic	s.t.

== Stage 4 ==
30 June 1971 - Nancy to Marche-en-Famenne, 242 km (150 mi)

Stage 4 result

Rank	Rider	Team	Time
1	Jean-Pierre Genet (FRA)	Fagor–Mercier–Hutchinson	6h 45' 03"
2	José Gómez Lucas (ESP)	Werner	+ 1"
3	Cyrille Guimard (FRA)	Fagor–Mercier–Hutchinson	+ 5"
4	Roger De Vlaeminck (BEL)	Flandria–Mars	s.t.
5	Guido Reybrouck (BEL)	Salvarani	s.t.
6	Gerben Karstens (NED)	Goudsmit–Hoff	s.t.
7	Walter Godefroot (BEL)	Peugeot–BP–Michelin	s.t.
8	Ger Harings (NED)	Goudsmit–Hoff	s.t.
9	Eddy Merckx (BEL)	Molteni	s.t.
10	Jan Krekels (NED)	Goudsmit–Hoff	s.t.

General classification after stage 4

Rank	Rider	Team	Time
1	Eddy Merckx (BEL)	Molteni	19h 43' 14"
2	Herman Van Springel (BEL)	Molteni	+ 21"
3	Roger De Vlaeminck (BEL)	Flandria–Mars	+ 32"
4	Gösta Pettersson (SWE)	Ferretti	+ 37"
5	Tino Tabak (NED)	Flandria–Mars	+ 42"
6	Enrico Paolini (ITA)	Scic	s.t.
7	Joop Zoetemelk (NED)	Flandria–Mars	s.t.
8	Gianni Motta (ITA)	Salvarani	+ 44"
9	Leif Mortensen (DEN)	Bic	+ 47"
10	Luis Ocaña (ESP)	Bic	s.t.

== Stage 5 ==
1 July 1971 - Dinant to Roubaix, 208.5 km (129.6 mi)

Stage 5 result

Rank	Rider	Team	Time
1	Pietro Guerra (ITA)	Salvarani	5h 13' 56"
2	Julien Stevens (BEL)	Molteni	s.t.
3	Robert Bouloux (FRA)	Peugeot–BP–Michelin	+ 3"
4	Willy Van Neste (BEL)	Flandria–Mars	s.t.
5	José Catieau (FRA)	Sonolor–Lejeune	s.t.
6	Albert Van Vlierberghe (BEL)	Ferretti	s.t.
7	Raymond Riotte (FRA)	Sonolor–Lejeune	+ 22"
8	Roger De Vlaeminck (BEL)	Flandria–Mars	+ 1' 16"
9	Erik De Vlaeminck (BEL)	Flandria–Mars	s.t.
10	Eddy Merckx (BEL)	Molteni	s.t.

General classification after stage 5

Rank	Rider	Team	Time
1	Eddy Merckx (BEL)	Molteni	24h 58' 21"
2	Herman Van Springel (BEL)	Molteni	+ 26"
3	Roger De Vlaeminck (BEL)	Flandria–Mars	+ 37"
4	Gösta Pettersson (SWE)	Ferretti	+ 42"
5	Joop Zoetemelk (NED)	Flandria–Mars	+ 44"
6	Tino Tabak (NED)	Flandria–Mars	+ 47"
7	Enrico Paolini (ITA)	Scic	+ 49"
8	Gianni Motta (ITA)	Salvarani	s.t.
9	Lucien Van Impe (BEL)	Sonolor–Lejeune	+ 51"
10	Leif Mortensen (DEN)	Bic	+ 52"

== Stage 6a ==
2 July 1971 - Roubaix to Amiens, 127.5 km (79.2 mi)

Stage 6a result

Rank	Rider	Team	Time
1	Eric Leman (BEL)	Flandria–Mars	3h 03' 19"
2	Gerben Karstens (NED)	Goudsmit–Hoff	s.t.
3	Cyrille Guimard (FRA)	Fagor–Mercier–Hutchinson	s.t.
4	Eddy Peelman (BEL)	Fagor–Mercier–Hutchinson	s.t.
5	Roger De Vlaeminck (BEL)	Flandria–Mars	s.t.
6	Walter Godefroot (BEL)	Peugeot–BP–Michelin	s.t.
7	Marinus Wagtmans (NED)	Molteni	s.t.
8	Albert Fritz (FRG)	Hoover–de Gribaldy–Wolber	s.t.
9	Erik De Vlaeminck (BEL)	Flandria–Mars	s.t.
10	Guido Reybrouck (BEL)	Salvarani	s.t.

General classification after stage 6a

Rank	Rider	Team	Time
1	Eddy Merckx (BEL)	Molteni	28h 01' 40"
2	Herman Van Springel (BEL)	Molteni	+ 26"
3	Roger De Vlaeminck (BEL)	Flandria–Mars	+ 37"
4	Gösta Pettersson (SWE)	Ferretti	+ 42"
5	Joop Zoetemelk (NED)	Flandria–Mars	+ 44"
6	Gianni Motta (ITA)	Salvarani	s.t.
7	Tino Tabak (NED)	Flandria–Mars	+ 47"
8	Enrico Paolini (ITA)	Scic	s.t.
9	Lucien Van Impe (BEL)	Sonolor–Lejeune	+ 51"
10	Leif Mortensen (DEN)	Bic	+ 52"

== Stage 6b ==
2 July 1971 - Amiens to Le Touquet, 133.5 km (83.0 mi)

Stage 6b result

Rank	Rider	Team	Time
1	Mauro Simonetti (ITA)	Ferretti	3h 47' 56"
2	Wilmo Francioni (ITA)	Ferretti	+ 3"
3	Frans Mintjens (BEL)	Molteni	+ 5"
4	Jos van der Vleuten (NED)	Goudsmit–Hoff	s.t.
5	Rolf Wolfshohl (FRG)	Fagor–Mercier–Hutchinson	s.t.
6	Ventura Díaz (ESP)	Werner	s.t.
7	Jean-Claude Genty (FRA)	Bic	s.t.
8	Roger De Vlaeminck (BEL)	Flandria–Mars	s.t.
9	Gerben Karstens (NED)	Goudsmit–Hoff	s.t.
10	Guido Reybrouck (BEL)	Salvarani	s.t.

General classification after stage 6b

Rank	Rider	Team	Time
1	Eddy Merckx (BEL)	Molteni	31h 49' 41"
2	Herman Van Springel (BEL)	Molteni	+ 26"
3	Roger De Vlaeminck (BEL)	Flandria–Mars	+ 37"
4	Gösta Pettersson (SWE)	Ferretti	+ 42"
5	Gianni Motta (ITA)	Salvarani	+ 43"
6	Joop Zoetemelk (NED)	Flandria–Mars	+ 44"
7	Enrico Paolini (ITA)	Scic	+ 47"
8	Tino Tabak (NED)	Flandria–Mars	s.t.
9	Lucien Van Impe (BEL)	Sonolor–Lejeune	+ 51"
10	Leif Mortensen (DEN)	Bic	+ 52"

== Rest day 1 ==
3 July 1971 - Le Touquet

== Stage 7 ==
4 July 1971 - Rungis to Nevers, 257.5 km (160.0 mi)

Stage 7 result

Rank	Rider	Team	Time
1	Eric Leman (BEL)	Flandria–Mars	6h 45' 33"
2	Gerben Karstens (NED)	Goudsmit–Hoff	s.t.
3	Walter Godefroot (BEL)	Peugeot–BP–Michelin	s.t.
4	Cyrille Guimard (FRA)	Fagor–Mercier–Hutchinson	s.t.
5	Gianni Motta (ITA)	Salvarani	s.t.
6	Ercole Gualazzini (ITA)	Salvarani	s.t.
7	Georges Vandenberghe (BEL)	Salvarani	s.t.
8	Mariano Martínez (FRA)	Hoover–de Gribaldy–Wolber	s.t.
9	Jan Van Katwijk (NED)	Goudsmit–Hoff	s.t.
10	Pietro Guerra (ITA)	Salvarani	s.t.

General classification after stage 7

Rank	Rider	Team	Time
1	Eddy Merckx (BEL)	Molteni	38h 35' 14"
2	Herman Van Springel (BEL)	Molteni	+ 26"
3	Roger De Vlaeminck (BEL)	Flandria–Mars	+ 37"
4	Gianni Motta (ITA)	Salvarani	+ 40"
5	Gösta Pettersson (SWE)	Ferretti	+ 42"
6	Joop Zoetemelk (NED)	Flandria–Mars	+ 44"
7	Enrico Paolini (ITA)	Scic	+ 47"
8	Tino Tabak (NED)	Flandria–Mars	s.t.
9	Lucien Van Impe (BEL)	Sonolor–Lejeune	+ 51"
10	Leif Mortensen (DEN)	Bic	+ 52"

== Stage 8 ==
5 July 1971 - Nevers to Puy de Dôme, 221 km (137 mi)

Stage 8 result

Rank	Rider	Team	Time
1	Luis Ocaña (ESP)	Bic	6h 21' 10"
2	Joop Zoetemelk (NED)	Flandria–Mars	+ 7"
3	Joaquim Agostinho (POR)	Hoover–de Gribaldy–Wolber	+ 13"
4	Eddy Merckx (BEL)	Molteni	+ 15"
5	Gösta Pettersson (SWE)	Ferretti	+ 49"
6	Agustín Tamames (ESP)	Werner	+ 1' 10"
7	Cyrille Guimard (FRA)	Fagor–Mercier–Hutchinson	+ 1' 15"
8	Bernard Thévenet (FRA)	Peugeot–BP–Michelin	+ 1' 21"
9	Gianni Motta (ITA)	Salvarani	+ 1' 37"
10	Enrico Paolini (ITA)	Scic	+ 1' 52"

General classification after stage 8

Rank	Rider	Team	Time
1	Eddy Merckx (BEL)	Molteni	44h 56' 39"
2	Joop Zoetemelk (NED)	Flandria–Mars	+ 36"
3	Luis Ocaña (ESP)	Bic	+ 37"
4	Gösta Pettersson (SWE)	Ferretti	+ 1' 16"
5	Bernard Thévenet (FRA)	Peugeot–BP–Michelin	+ 1' 58"
6	Gianni Motta (ITA)	Salvarani	+ 2' 02"
7	Enrico Paolini (ITA)	Scic	+ 2' 24"
8	Tomas Pettersson (SWE)	Ferretti	+ 2' 48"
9	Lucien Van Impe (BEL)	Sonolor–Lejeune	+ 2' 51"
10	Leif Mortensen (DEN)	Bic	+ 3' 12"

== Stage 9 ==
6 July 1971 - Clermont-Ferrand to Saint-Étienne, 153 km (95 mi)

Stage 9 result

Rank	Rider	Team	Time
1	Walter Godefroot (BEL)	Peugeot–BP–Michelin	4h 02' 18"
2	Wilmo Francioni (ITA)	Ferretti	s.t.
3	Jozef Spruyt (BEL)	Molteni	s.t.
4	Jean-Pierre Danguillaume (FRA)	Peugeot–BP–Michelin	s.t.
5	Marinus Wagtmans (NED)	Molteni	s.t.
6	Jean-Pierre Genet (FRA)	Fagor–Mercier–Hutchinson	+ 32"
7	Vicente López Carril (ESP)	Kas–Kaskol	s.t.
8	Jean-Claude Genty (FRA)	Bic	s.t.
9	Lucien Aimar (FRA)	Sonolor–Lejeune	s.t.
10	Gianni Motta (ITA)	Salvarani	+ 6' 08"

General classification after stage 9

Rank	Rider	Team	Time
1	Eddy Merckx (BEL)	Molteni	49h 05' 06"
2	Joop Zoetemelk (NED)	Flandria–Mars	+ 36"
3	Luis Ocaña (ESP)	Bic	+ 37"
4	Gösta Pettersson (SWE)	Ferretti	+ 1' 16"
5	Bernard Thévenet (FRA)	Peugeot–BP–Michelin	+ 1' 58"
6	Gianni Motta (ITA)	Salvarani	+ 2' 02"
7	Enrico Paolini (ITA)	Scic	+ 2' 24"
8	Tomas Pettersson (SWE)	Ferretti	+ 2' 48"
9	Lucien Van Impe (BEL)	Sonolor–Lejeune	+ 2' 51"
10	Leif Mortensen (DEN)	Bic	+ 3' 12"
