= 1970 Paris–Tours =

Race details
- Dates: 2 October 1970
- Stages: 1
- Distance: 286 km (177.7 mi)
- Winning time: 6h 58' 25"

Results
	Winner	Jürgen Tschan (FRG)	(Peugeot–BP–Michelin)
	Second	René Pijnen (NED)	(Willem II–Gazelle)
	Third	Guido Reybrouck (BEL)	(Germanvox–Wega)

The 1970 Paris–Tours was the 64th edition of the Paris–Tours cycle race and was held on 2 October 1970. The race started in Paris and finished in Tours. The race was won by Jürgen Tschan of the Peugeot team.

== General classification ==
Final general classification

Rank	Rider	Team	Time
1	Jürgen Tschan (FRG)	Peugeot–BP–Michelin	6h 58' 25"
2	René Pijnen (NED)	Willem II–Gazelle	+ 56"
3	Guido Reybrouck (BEL)	Germanvox–Wega	+ 3' 21"
4	Marino Basso (ITA)	Molteni	+ 3' 21"
5	Roger De Vlaeminck (BEL)	Flandria–Mars	+ 3' 21"
6	Frans Verbeeck (BEL)	Geens–Watney	+ 3' 21"
7	Jack Mourioux (FRA)	Fagor–Mercier–Hutchinson	+ 3' 21"
8	Roger Rosiers (BEL)	Bic	+ 3' 21"
9	Frans Staes (BEL)	Flandria–Mars	+ 3' 21"
10	Leif Mortensen (DEN)	Bic	+ 3' 21"
