= 1970 Tour of the Basque Country =

Race details
- Dates: 15–19 April 1970
- Stages: 5
- Distance: 877 km (544.9 mi)
- Winning time: 25h 00' 45"

Results
	Winner	Luis Santamarina (ESP)	(Werner)
	Second	Jesús Aranzabal (ESP)	(Bic)
	Third	Andrés Gandarias (ESP)	(Kas–Kaskol)

The 1970 Tour of the Basque Country was the tenth edition of the Tour of the Basque Country cycle race and was held from 15 April to 19 April 1970. The race started and finished in Eibar. The race was won by Luis Santamarina of the Werner team.

== General classification ==
Final general classification

Rank	Rider	Team	Time
1	Luis Santamarina (ESP)	Werner	25h 00' 45"
2	Jesús Aranzabal (ESP)	Bic	+ 41"
3	Andrés Gandarias (ESP)	Kas–Kaskol	+ 49"
4	Vicente López Carril (ESP)	Kas–Kaskol	+ 1' 05"
5	Domingo Perurena (ESP)	Fagor–Mercier–Hutchinson	+ 1' 43"
6	Antonio Gómez del Moral (ESP)	Kas–Kaskol	+ 1' 58"
7	Ventura Díaz (ESP)	Werner	+ 3' 35"
8	Agustín Tamames (ESP)	Werner	+ 3' 43"
9	Roland Berland (FRA)	Bic	+ 4' 50"
10	Aurelio González Puente (ESP)	Kas–Kaskol	+ 7' 07"
