= Team classification in the Vuelta a España =

Secondary classification in the Spanish cycling grand tour

Team classification
- Sport: Road Cycling
- Competition: Vuelta a España
- Awarded for: Fastest team
- Local name: Clasificación por equipos (in Spanish)

History
- First award: 1935
- Editions: 80 (2025)
- First winner: Belgium
- Most wins: Movistar Team (12 times)
- Most recent: UAE Team Emirates XRG

The team classification in the Vuelta a España is a prize that is contested in the Vuelta a España. It has been awarded since the race's inception in 1935.

== Winners ==
Team classification winners

Year	Team
1935	Belgium
1936	Belgium
1941	Spain
1942	Spain
1945	Spain
1946	Spain
1947	Spain
1948	Spain
1950	Spain
1955	France
1956	Spain
1957	Pirenaico
1958	Belgium
1959	Faema–Guerra
1960	Groene Leeuw–Sinalco–SAS
1961	Faema
1962	Saint-Raphaël–Helyett–Hutchinson
1963	Saint-Raphaël–Gitane–R. Geminiani
1964	Kas–Kaskol
1965	Mercier–BP–Hutchinson
1966	Kas–Kaskol
1967	Kas–Kaskol
1968	Kas–Kaskol
1969	Bic
1970	Werner
1971	Werner
1972	Kas–Kaskol

Year	Team
1973	La Casera–Peña Bahamontes
1974	Kas–Kaskol
1975	Kas–Kaskol
1976	Kas–Campagnolo
1977	Teka
1978	Kas–Campagnolo
1979	Kas–Campagnolo
1980	Splendor
1981	Zor–Helios–Novostil
1982	Kelme–Merckx
1983	Zor–Gemeaz Cusin
1984	Teka
1985	Zor–Gemeaz Cusin
1986	Zor–BH
1987	Postobón–Manzana–Ryalcao
1988	BH
1989	Kelme
1990	ONCE
1991	ONCE
1992	Amaya Seguros
1993	Amaya Seguros
1994	Banesto
1995	ONCE
1996	Team Polti
1997	Kelme–Costa Blanca
1998	Banesto

Year	Team
1999	Banesto
2000	Kelme–Costa Blanca
2001	iBanesto.com
2002	Kelme–Costa Blanca
2003	iBanesto.com
2004	Comunidad Valenciana–Kelme
2005	Comunidad Valenciana–Elche
2006	Discovery Channel
2007	Caisse d'Epargne
2008	Caisse d'Epargne
2009	Xacobeo–Galicia
2010	Team Katusha
2011	Geox–TMC
2012	Movistar Team
2013	Euskaltel–Euskadi
2014	Team Katusha
2015	Movistar Team
2016	BMC Racing Team
2017	Astana
2018	Movistar Team
2019	Movistar Team
2020	Movistar Team
2021	Team Bahrain Victorious
2022	Team Jumbo–Visma
2023	Team Jumbo–Visma
2024	UAE Team Emirates
2025	UAE Team Emirates XRG
2026	Decathlon CMA CGM

== Multiple winners ==
Wins	Name	Years
12	Movistar Team	1994, 1998, 1999, 2001, 2003, 2007, 2008, 2012, 2015, 2018, 2019, 2020
10	Kas	1964, 1966, 1967, 1968, 1972, 1974, 1975, 1976, 1978, 1979
7	Amaya Seguros	1981, 1983, 1985, 1986, 1988, 1992, 1993
7	Kelme	1982, 1989, 1997, 2000, 2002, 2004, 2005
6	Spain	1941, 1946, 1947, 1948, 1950, 1956
3	Belgium	1935, 1936, 1958
3	ONCE	1990, 1991, 1995
2	Faema	1959, 1961
2	Saint-Raphaël	1962, 1963
2	Werner	1970, 1971
2	Teka	1977, 1984
2	Team Katusha–Alpecin	2010, 2014
2	Visma–Lease a Bike	2022, 2023
2	UAE Team Emirates XRG	2024, 2025

== See also ==
- Team classification in the Giro d'Italia
- Team classification in the Tour de France
