= Félix González =

Félix González may refer to:

- Félix González (cyclist) (born 1945), Spanish cyclist
- Félix González Canto (born 1968), Mexican politician and economist
- Félix González-Torres (1957–1996), American, Cuban-born, gay visual artist
- Félix González, politician elected in the 2009 Chilean parliamentary election
- Félix González, Argentine boxer who fought Chilean boxer Martín Vargas in 1975
