= Team classification =

The team classification is one of the different rankings for which competitors can compete in a multiple stage cycling race. It differs from the other usual rankings (general classification, points, king of the mountain and best young rider competition) in the sense that it awards the effort of a whole team, rather than the performance of the individual riders.

Examples include:

- Team classification in the Giro d'Italia; awarded since the race's inception. In more recent editions the classification is calculated by adding up the top three riders' times from each team, and then the team with the lowest total time is the leader of the classification. In case of a tie, the teams are separated by the sum of the places obtained by their three best riders at the finish.
- Team classification in the Tour de France; awarded since 1930, and the calculation has changed throughout the years. As of 2011, it is calculated by adding the times of the three best riders of each team per stage; time bonuses and penalties are ignored. In a team time trial, the team gets the time of the fifth rider of that team to cross the finish, or the last rider if there are fewer than 5 left for the team. If a team has fewer than three cyclists remaining, it is removed from this classification.
- Team classification in the Vuelta a España; awarded since its inception in 1935.

== Status ==
The team classification is considered less important than the individual general classification, and it is rare that a team starts one of the major cycling events with the main goal of winning the team classification. This is also subject to cultural preference, as Spanish teams are for instance well known for taking great interest in winning the team classification.

If during the race a team is in a good position to win the team classification, the team may change tactics in order to win. When Lance Armstrong lost hopes of winning the 2010 Tour de France, he instructed his team mates to keep an eye on their main rivals for the team classification, and his Team RadioShack won the team classification for that event.

In some races, a good performance in the team classification may help a team to qualify for the next event. In 2010, a system was set up to determine which teams qualify as UCI ProTeams in the Tour de France, and the team classification in the Tour de France was part of this system.
