= Wagtmans =

Wagtmans is a Dutch surname. Notable people with the surname include:

- Rini Wagtmans (born 1946), Dutch cyclist
- Wout Wagtmans (1929–1994), Dutch cyclist, uncle of Rini
