= Frits Hoogerheide =

Dutch cyclist (1944–2014)

Personal information
- Full name: Frits Hoogerheide
- Born: 27 March 1944 (age 82) Ossendrecht, Netherlands
- Died: 3 November 2014 (aged 70)

Cycling career
- Sport: Cycling
- Discipline: Road
- Role: Rider

Professional team
- 1969–1970: Willem II–Gazelle

Frits Hoogerheide (27 March 1944 – 3 November 2014) was a Dutch racing cyclist. He finished in last place in the 1970 Tour de France. He also rode in the 1970 Vuelta a España, and finished 2nd on two stages.

== Major results ==
1968
2nd Ronde van Midden-Nederland
3rd Overall Olympia's Tour
1969
1st Stage 7 Olympia's Tour
