= Tour de la Nouvelle-France =

Cycling race in Canada

Race details
- Region: Canada
- English name: Tour of New France
- Discipline: Road
- Competition: Super Prestige Pernod
- Type: Stage race

History
- First edition: 1971
- Editions: 2
- Final edition: 1972
- First winner: Guido Reybrouck (BEL)
- Final winner: Guido Reybrouck (BEL)

The Tour de la Nouvelle-France was a professional cycle race held as a stage race in Canada. It was only held twice in two years, in 1971 and 1972. It was won in both years by Guido Reybrouck, a rider from Belgium. In 1972 it was part of the Super Prestige Pernod series.

== Winners ==
Year	Country	Rider	Team
1971	Belgium	Guido Reybrouck	Salvarani
1972	Belgium	Guido Reybrouck	Salvarani
