= 1970 Vuelta a España =

Race details
- Dates: 23 April – 12 May
- Stages: 19
- Distance: 3,568 km (2,217 mi)
- Winning time: 89h 57' 12"

Results
Jersey awarded to the overall winner	Winner	Luis Ocaña (ESP)	(Bic)
	Second	Augustín Tamames (ESP)	(Werner)
	Third	Herman Van Springel (BEL)	(Mann-Grundig)
Jersey awarded to the points classification winner	Points	Guido Reybroeck (BEL)	(Germanwox – Wega)
	Mountains	Augustín Tamames (ESP)	(Werner)
	Combination	Guido Reybroeck (BEL)	(Germanwox – Wega)
	Sprints	Miguel María Lasa (ESP)	(La Casera)

The 1970 Vuelta a España was the 25th Edition Vuelta a España, taking place from 23 April to 12 May 1970. It consisted of 19 stages over 3,568 km (2,217 mi), ridden at an average speed of 39.85 km/h (24.76 mph). The race revealed Augustín Tamames as a contender for the future at the Vuelta as Tamames riding in his first Vuelta held the race lead in the final week until the final individual time trial when Luis Ocaña rode himself into the lead. Ocaña had finished runner up in the previous edition of the race and won the two time trials in the 1970 Vuelta. It would be Ocaña's only win in the Spanish race.

== Route ==
List of stages
Stage	Date	Course	Distance	Type	Winner
P	23 April	Cádiz to Cádiz	6 km (4 mi)	Individual time trial	Luis Ocaña (ESP)
1	24 April	Cádiz to Jerez de la Frontera	170 km (106 mi)		Eddy Peelman (BEL)
2	25 April	Jerez de la Frontera to Fuengirola	217 km (135 mi)		Julián Cuevas (ESP)
3	26 April	Fuengirola to Almería	249 km (155 mi)		Guido Reybrouck (BEL)
4	27 April	Almería to Lorca	161 km (100 mi)		Jean Ronsmans (BEL)
5	28 April	Lorca to Calp	209 km (130 mi)		Luis Santamarina (ESP)
6	29 April	Calp to Borriana	198 km (123 mi)		Eddy Peelman (BEL)
7	30 April	Borriana to Tarragona	201 km (125 mi)		Guido Reybrouck (BEL)
8a	1 May	Tarragona to Barcelona	100 km (62 mi)		Ramón Sáez (ESP)
8b	1 May	Barcelona to Barcelona	48 km (30 mi)		Guido Reybrouck (BEL)
9	2 May	Barcelona to Igualada	189 km (117 mi)		Agustín Tamames (ESP)
10	3 May	Igualada to Zaragoza	237 km (147 mi)		Anatole Novak (FRA)
11	4 May	Zaragoza to Calatayud	118 km (73 mi)		Rini Wagtmans (NED)
12	5 May	Calatayud to Madrid	204 km (127 mi)		Johny Schleck (LUX)
13	6 May	Madrid to Soria	221 km (137 mi)		Marinus Wagtmans (NED)
14	7 May	Soria to Valladolid	238 km (148 mi)		Jan Serpenti (NED)
15	8 May	Valladolid to Burgos	134 km (83 mi)		Ramón Sáez (ESP)
16	9 May	Burgos to Santander	179 km (111 mi)		Roger Rosiers (BEL)
17	10 May	Santander to Vitoria	191 km (119 mi)		Willy In 't Ven (BEL)
18	11 May	Vitoria to San Sebastián	157 km (98 mi)		José María Errandonea (ESP)
19a	12 May	San Sebastián to Llodio	104 km (65 mi)		Jos van der Vleuten (NED)
19b	12 May	Llodio to Bilbao	29 km (18 mi)	Individual time trial	Luis Ocaña (ESP)
	Total		3,568 km (2,217 mi)		

== Results ==
=== Final General Classification ===
Rank	Rider	Team	Time
1	(Spain) Luis Ocaña	Bic	89h 57' 12"
2	(Spain) Agustín Tamames	Werner	+ 1' 18"
3	(Belgium) Herman Van Springel	Mann–Grundig	+ 1' 27"
4	(Spain) Jesús Manzaneque Sánchez	Werner	+ 1' 27"
5	(Belgium) Willy In 't Ven	Mann–Grundig	+ 2' 00"
6	(Spain) Francisco Galdós Gauna	Kas–Kaskol	+ 3' 07"
7	(Spain) Miguel María Lasa	La Casera–Pena Bahamontes	+ 3' 09"
8	(Spain) Joaquim Galera	La Casera–Pena Bahamontes	+ 3' 15"
9	(Spain) Luis Pedro Santamarina	Werner	+ 3' 50"
10	(Spain) Juan Manuel Santisteban	Karpy	+ 4' 15"
11	(Spain) Aurelio González Puente	Kas–Kaskol	
12	(Spain) Ventura Díaz Arrey	Werner	
13	(Spain) Eduardo Castelló Villanova	Karpy	
14	(Spain) José Manuel Lasa Orguia	La Casera-Pena Bahamontes	
15	(Spain) Andrés Gandarias Albizu	Kas-Kaskol	
16	(Spain) José Manuel Fuente	Karpy	
17	(Spain) Vicente López Carril	Kas-Kaskol	
18	(Spain) Luis Balagué Carreño	Werner	
19	(Belgium) André Poppe	Mann-Grundig	
20	(Netherlands) René Pijnen	Willem II – Gazelle	
21	(Spain) José Albelda Tormo	Karpy	
22	(Spain) Francisco Gabica Billa	Kas–Kaskol	
23	(Spain) Antonio Gómez del Moral	Kas–Kaskol	
24	(Spain) Carlos Echeverría Zudaire	Kas–Kaskol	
25	(Spain) Ángel Barrigón Argumusa	Karpy	
