= José Grande =

Spanish cyclist (1944–2024)

Personal information
- Born: 4 October 1944 Minaya, Spain
- Died: 22 September 2024 (aged 79) Valencia, Spain

Cycling career
- Sport: Cycling
- Discipline: Road
- Role: Rider

Professional teams
- 1969: Karpy
- 1970–1972: Werner
- 1973–1975: Kas–Kaskol
- 1976: Scic
- 1977: Teka

José Grande (4 October 1944 – 22 September 2024) was a Spanish racing cyclist. He rode in three editions of the Tour de France, five of the Giro d'Italia, and three of the Vuelta a España. Grande died in Valencia on 22 September 2024, at the age of 79.

== Major results ==
1971
3rd Overall Vuelta a Asturias
1972
3rd Overall Vuelta a Asturias
1973
1st GP Viscaya
2nd GP Pascuas
1974
1st Overall Vuelta a los Valles Mineros
1st Overall Vuelta a Segovia
