= Jan Serpenti =

Dutch cyclist (born 1945)

Personal information
- Born: 6 March 1945 (age 81) Bergen, North Holland, Netherlands

Cycling career
- Sport: Cycling
- Discipline: Road
- Role: Rider

Professional teams
- 1969–1971: Willem II–Gazelle
- 1972: Wybert–Läkerol
- 1973: Kela Carpet
- 1974: Robot–Gazelle

Jan Serpenti (born 6 March 1945) is a Dutch racing cyclist. He rode in the 1970 Tour de France. He also won the 14th stage of the 1970 Vuelta a España.

== Major results ==
1967
1st Stage 5b Peace Race
1968
3rd Ronde van Noord-Holland
1970
1st Stage 14 Vuelta a España
1973
2nd Omloop van de Fruitstreek
