= Billy Bilsland =

Scottish cyclist

Personal information
- Born: 9 November 1945 (age 80) Glasgow, Scotland

Cycling career
- Sport: Cycling

Amateur team
- Glasgow Wheelers

William "Billy" Law Bilsland (born 9 November 1945) is a British former professional racing cyclist.

== Amateur career ==
Bilsland began racing in 1963. As an amateur he raced mostly in the UK, especially in his native Scotland. He did though win in continental Europe taking 2 stages of the 1965 Tour of Slovakia. He also won in continental Europe taking 2 stages of the Peace Race in East Germany in 1966. That year he represented the Scotland team at the 1966 British Empire and Commonwealth Games in Kingston, Jamaica, in the road race event, finishing 9th.

He won another stage of the Peace Race in 1967, this time in Liberec.

He competed in the individual road race at the 1968 Summer Olympics.

In 1969 he raced more prominently in continental Europe, winning a stage and the general classification of the Saint Pourcain 3 day race. He also won a stage of the Tour Nivernais Morvan (finishing second overall in the GC) and of the Tour de l'Avenir. These wins sandwiched a 16th-place finish in the World Amateur Road Race Championship held that year in Brno in Czechoslovakia.

Bilsland attended a second Commonwealth Games when he was selecetd by the 1970 Scottish team at the 1970 British Commonwealth Games in Edinburgh, Scotland, where he competed in the road race.

== Professional career ==
Turned pro in 1970 joining the Peugeot team in France for 3 seasons. He finished 14th in the 1971 World Professional Road race championship, finishing 6 minutes and 51 seconds behind winner Eddy Merckx.

In 1973 he joined the TI Raleigh team for 2 seasons.

== Post racing career ==
He retired from racing in 1974. He opened the eponymous bike shop Billy Bilsland Cycles in 1980 in Glasgow's Saltmarket, since taken over by his son Neil.
