= Juan Manuel Santisteban =

Spanish cyclist (1944–1976)

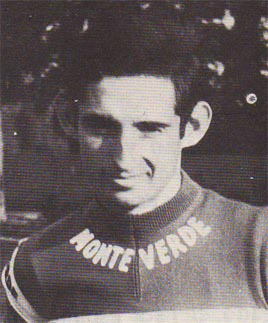

Personal information
- Full name: Juan Manuel Santisteban Lapeire
- Born: October 25, 1944 Ampuero, Spain
- Died: May 21, 1976 (aged 31) Catania, Italy

Cycling career
- Sport: Cycling
- Discipline: Road
- Role: Rider

Professional teams
- 1969: La Casera–Peña Bahamontes
- 1970–1972: Karpy–Licor
- 1973: Monteverde
- 1974–1976: Kas–Kaskol

Juan Manuel Santisteban Lapeire (25 October 1944 – 21 May 1976) was a Spanish road cyclist.

During the first stage of the 1976 Giro d'Italia, Santisteban crashed and hit his head, ultimately dying from his injuries.

He rode in five editions of the Vuelta a España, winning two stages.

== Major results ==
1970
3rd Overall Vuelta a La Rioja
10th Overall Vuelta a España
1971
1st Stage 3 Vuelta a Levante
1st Stage 5 Vuelta a Asturias
1st Stage 3 Vuelta a Cantabria
1972
1st Stage 5 Volta a Catalunya
1973
1st Stage 9 Vuelta a España
1974
1st Overall Vuelta a Asturias

1st Stages 2b (TTT) & 4

1st Stage 15 Vuelta a España
1st Stage 2 Vuelta a Aragón
1st Stage 6 Critérium du Dauphiné Libéré
1st Stage 4 Vuelta a los Valles Mineros
1st Overall Tres Días de Leganés
2nd Overall Vuelta a La Rioja
2nd Overall Vuelta a Segovia
1976
1st Stage 7 Vuelta a Andalucía
