= Dámaso Torres =

Spanish cyclist

Personal information
- Born: 11 December 1945 (age 80)

Cycling career
- Sport: Cycling
- Role: Rider

Dámaso Torres (born 11 December 1945) is a Spanish racing cyclist. He rode in the 1973 Tour de France.
