= Hertekamp =

Team information
- Registered: Belgium
- Founded: 1970
- Disbanded: 1973
- Discipline: Road

Key personnel
- Team managers: Luc Landuyt; Florent Van Vaerenbergh; Carlo Menicagli; Henri De Wolf

Team name history
- 1970–1971 1972–1973: Hertekamp–Magniflex; Hertekamp
Hertekamp jersey
Jersey

Hertekamp was a Belgian professional cycling team that existed from 1970 to 1973. The team participated in the Giro d'Italia in 1970 and 1971 and the 1971 Vuelta a España. Jean Ronsmans won the 4th stage of the latter. The road team folded after 1973, and converted to a cyclo-cross team, which existed until 1988.
