= José Manuel Lasa =

Spanish cyclist (born 1939)

Personal information
- Born: 21 May 1939 (age 87) Oiartzun, Guipúzcoa, Spain
- Height: 1.74 m (5 ft 9 in)
- Weight: 77 kg (170 lb)

Cycling career
- Sport: Cycling
- Current team: Retired
- Discipline: Road

Professional teams
- 1966–1967: Fagor
- 1968: Kas–Kaskol
- 1969: Pepsi-Cola
- 1970: La Casera–Peña Bahamontes

José Manuel Lasa (born 21 May 1939) is a Spanish former cyclist. He competed in the individual road race at the 1964 Summer Olympics and finished fourth overall in the 1969 Vuelta a España. He is the older brother of fellow cyclist Miguel María Lasa.

== Major results ==
1966
3rd Overall Vuelta a La Rioja

1st Stage 1

4th Overall Setmana Catalana de Ciclisme
1967
1st Stage 2 Vuelta a La Rioja
1st Stage 4b Grand Prix du Midi Libre
5th Overall Tour de Romandie
5th Overall Volta a Catalunya
6th Road race, UCI Road World Championships
10th Overall Eibarko Bizikleta
1968
1st Stage 4 Eibarko Bizikleta
1969
1st Klasika Primavera
3rd Overall Vuelta a Andalucía
3rd GP Pascuas
4th Overall Vuelta a España
5th Volta a la Comunitat Valenciana
9th Overall Setmana Catalana de Ciclisme
