= Jesús Aranzabal =

Spanish cyclist (1939–2023)

Personal information
- Born: 25 December 1939 Bergara, Spain
- Died: 27 September 2023 (aged 83) Bergara

Cycling career
- Sport: Cycling
- Current team: Retired
- Discipline: Road
- Role: Rider

Professional teams
- 1964: Inuri
- 1965: GAC–Mobylette
- 1966–1969: Fagor
- 1970–1972: Bic

Major wins
- Grand Tours Vuelta a España 1 individual stage (1972) Stage races Vuelta a Andalucía (1966)

Jesús Aranzabal Ojanguren (25 December 1939 – 27 September 2023) was a Spanish professional cyclist. Professional from 1964 to 1972, he notably won a stage of the 1972 Vuelta a España and the general classification of the 1966 Vuelta a Andalucía. He also finished 2nd and won a stage of the 1970 Tour of the Basque Country. Aranzabal died on 27 September 2023, at the age of 83.

== Major results ==
1963
1st Overall Vuelta al Bidasoa
1966
1st Overall Vuelta a Andalucía
1st Clásica a los Puertos de Guadarrama
1st Stage 2 Vuelta a Ávila
1967
10th Overall Vuelta a Andalucía
1968
1st Stage 3 Vuelta a Mallorca
3rd National Road Race Championships
3rd Trofeo Baracchi
1970
2nd National Road Race Championships
2nd Overall Tour of the Basque Country

1st Stage 5

3rd Klasika Primavera
1971
1st Stages 4 & 6b Volta a Portugal
1972
1st Stage 17a Vuelta a España
