= Jean-Claude Genty =

French cyclist

Personal information
- Born: 17 December 1945 (age 80)

Cycling career
- Sport: Cycling
- Role: Rider

Jean-Claude Genty (born 17 December 1945) is a French racing cyclist. He rode in the 1970 Tour de France.
