= Germanvox–Wega =

Italian cycling team (1967-1970)

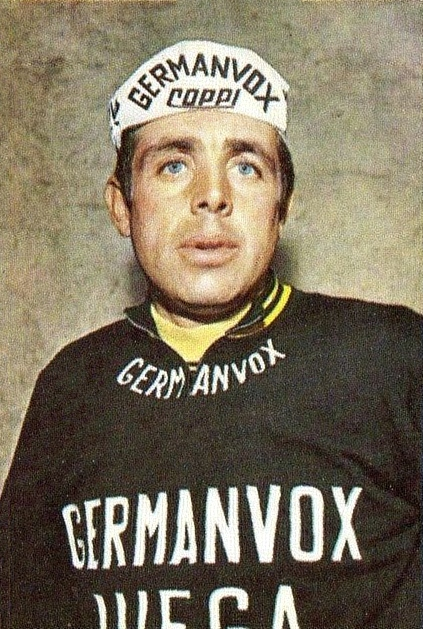
- Guido Reybrouck wearing the team's jersey in 1970

Team information
- Registered: Italy
- Founded: 1967
- Disbanded: 1970
- Discipline: Road

Team name history
- 1967–1970: Germanvox–Wega

Germanvox–Wega was an Italian professional cycling team that existed from 1967 to 1970.

The team was selected to race in four editions of the Giro d'Italia, where they achieved two stage wins.

== Major victories ==
1967
Stage 16 (ITT) Giro d'Italia, Ole Ritter
Stage 4 Tirreno–Adriatico, Bruno Vittiglio
1969
Stage 17 Giro d'Italia, Ole Ritter
Stage 5b (ITT) Giro di Sardegna, Ole Ritter
1970
Vuelta a España

Points classification, Guido Reybrouck
Stages 4, 8 & 10, Guido Reybrouck

Trofeo Matteotti, Ole Ritter
Gran Premio di Lugano, Ole Ritter
Stage 7 Paris–Nice, Guido Reybrouck
Stage 2 Paris–Nice, Ole Ritter
