= René De Bie =

Belgian cyclist

Personal information
- Born: 2 November 1945 (age 80)

Cycling career
- Sport: Cycling
- Role: Rider

René De Bie (born 2 November 1945) is a Belgian racing cyclist. He rode in the 1970 Tour de France.
