= Caballero (cycling team) =

Dutch professional cycling team

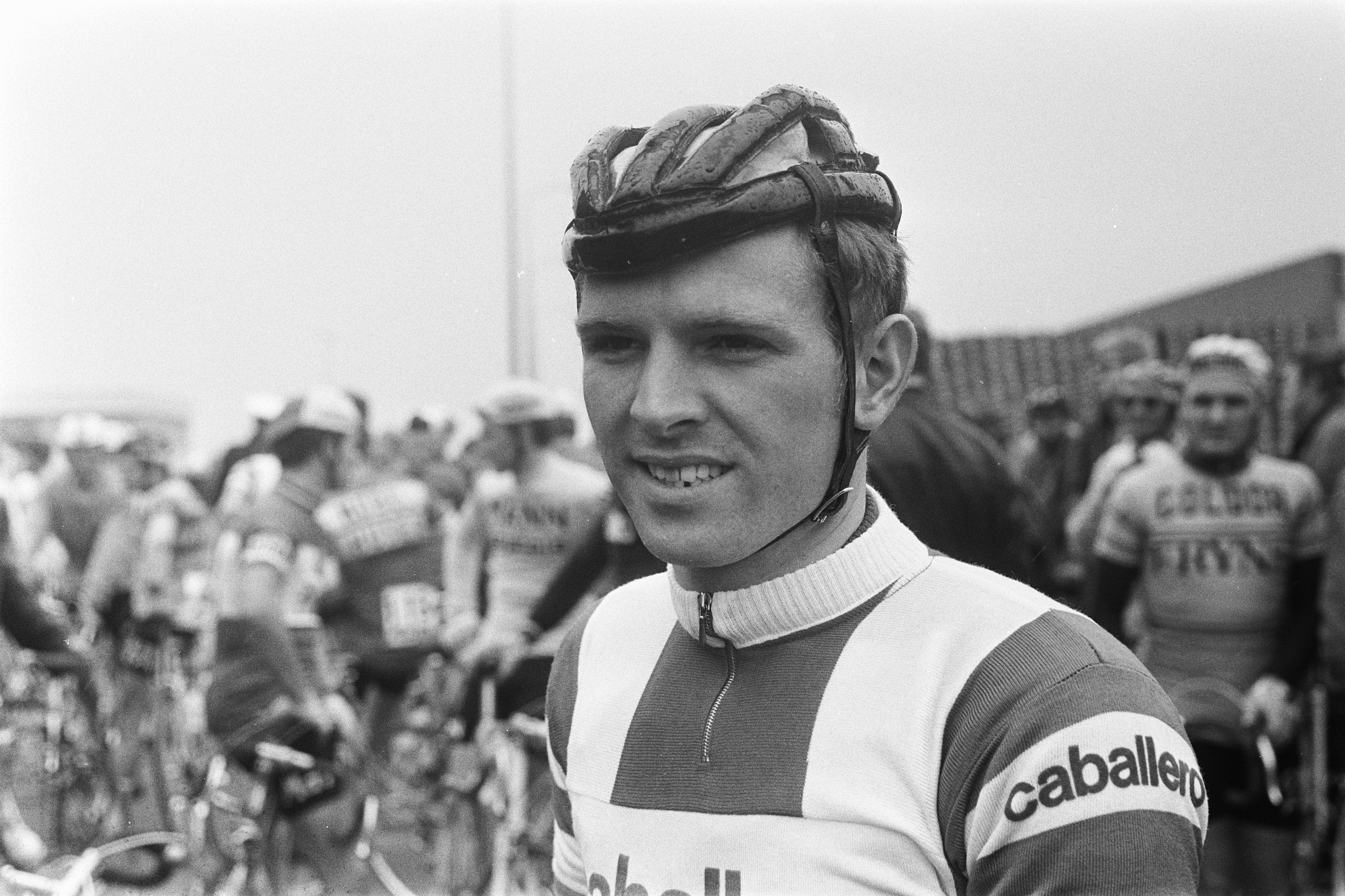
- Wim Schepers at the 1970 Amstel Gold Race

Team information
- Registered: Netherlands
- Founded: 1962
- Disbanded: 1972
- Discipline: Road

Team name history
- 1962–1967 1968 1969 1970 1971–1972: Caballero; Caballero–Wielersport; Caballero; Caballero–Laurens; Goudsmit–Hoff

Caballero was a Dutch professional cycling team that existed from 1962 to 1972.
