= Willy In 't Ven =

Belgian cyclist (born 1943)

Personal information
- Born: 1 March 1943 (age 83) Turnhout, Belgium

Cycling career
- Sport: Cycling
- Current team: Retired
- Discipline: Road
- Role: Rider

Professional teams
- 1966–1970: Dr. Mann–Grundig
- 1971: Flandria–Mars
- 1972–1973: Molteni
- 1974–1975: IJsboerke–Colner
- 1976: Gero–Eurosol–Van Looy
- 1977: Bianchi–Campagnolo
- 1978: Carlos–Galli–Alan

Willy In 't Ven (born 1 March 1943, in Turnhout) is a Belgian former professional racing cyclist. He competed in seven editions of the Tour de France, four of the Giro d'Italia and one Vuelta a España.

His brother, Paul and son Danny were also professional cyclists.

== Major results ==
1964
1st Stage 1 Ronde van Namen
1966
3rd Liège–Bastogne–Liège
1967
2nd Rund um Köln
2nd Road race, National Road Championships
3rd Grand Prix d'Isbergues
3rd Tour du Condroz
1968
1st Grand Prix d'Isbergues
2nd Tour du Condroz
1969
1st Brabantse Pijl
1st Stage 2b Tour of Belgium (TTT)
1st Omloop van de Vlaamse Scheldeboorden
3rd Overall Four Days of Dunkirk

1st Stage 3

1970
1st Stage 17 Vuelta a España
3rd Trofeo Baracchi
1973
1st E3 Prijs Vlaanderen
3rd Tour du Condroz
1978
3rd Tour du Condroz
