= Johny Schleck =

Luxembourgish cyclist

Personal information
- Full name: Johny Schleck
- Born: 22 November 1942 (age 83) Assel, Luxembourg, Luxembourg

Cycling career
- Sport: Cycling
- Current team: Retired
- Role: Rider

Professional teams
- 1965–1968: Pelforth–Sauvage–Lejeune
- 1969–1974: Bic

Major wins
- Grand Tours Vuelta a España 1 individual stage (1970) One-day races and Classics National Road Race Championships (1965, 1973)

Johny Schleck (born 22 November 1942) is a former professional cyclist from Luxembourg.

== Professional life ==
Between 1965 and 1974 Schleck was a professional cyclist. He participated in the Tour de France eight times (1965–1968 and 1970–1973). From 1965 until 1968, he rode in the Pelforth - Sauvage - Lejeune team, and in the Bic-team from 1969 until the end of his career.

Johny rode the Tour de France at the service of 1968 winner Jan Janssen and 1973 winner Luis Ocaña, and also managed to finish in the top 20 of the general classification twice: 19th in 1970 and 20th in 1967. He won a stage in the 1970 Vuelta a España and the Luxembourg National Championships. Johnny's father, Auguste Schleck, also contested events in the 1920s. He also competed in the individual road race at the 1964 Summer Olympics.

== Personal life ==
Schleck is married and has three sons, two of whom were professional cyclists: Fränk (born 1980) and Andy (born 1985).

== Major results ==
1962
4th Overall Grand Prix François Faber
1963
1st Overall Flèche du Sud
1964
1st Stage 2 Tour de l'Avenir
2nd Overall Tour of Austria

1st Stages 3 & 10

1965 (1 Pro win)
1st Road race, National Road Championships
8th Overall Volta a Catalunya
9th Overall Paris–Luxembourg
1966
2nd Road race, National Road Championships
7th Overall Tour de l'Oise
10th Grand Prix d'Isbergues
1967 (2)
1st Stage 3 Tour de l'Oise
2nd Road race, National Road Championships
5th Giro del Ticino
7th GP Petit Varois
9th Omloop Het Volk
9th Overall Tour de Luxembourg

1st Stage 5

1968 (1)
1st Stage 2 Tour de Luxembourg
2nd Road race, National Road Championships
8th Trofeo Masferrer
1969
8th Overall Tour de Luxembourg
1970 (1)
1st Stage 12 Vuelta a España
2nd Overall Tour d'Indre-et-Loire
10th Overall Tour de Luxembourg
1971
10th Tour du Haut Var
10th Tour de la Nouvelle-France
1973 (3)
1st Road race, National Road Championships
1st Prologue (TTT) Critérium du Dauphiné Libéré
1st Prologue (TTT) Tour de Luxembourg
1974
7th Overall Tour de Luxembourg

=== Grand Tour general classification results timeline ===
Grand Tour	1965	1966	1967	1968	1969	1970	1971	1972	1973	1974
Vuelta a España	—	—	40	26	35	26	DNF	26	34	DNF
Giro d'Italia	—	—	—	—	—	—	—	—	—	—
Tour de France	52	35	20	DNF	—	19	22	30	32	—

Legend
—	Did not compete
DNF	Did not finish
