= Félix González (cyclist) =

Spanish cyclist

Personal information
- Born: 25 October 1945 (age 80)

Cycling career
- Sport: Cycling
- Role: Rider

Félix González (born 25 October 1945) is a Spanish racing cyclist. He rode in the 1973 Tour de France.
