= Guido Reybrouck =

Belgian cyclist

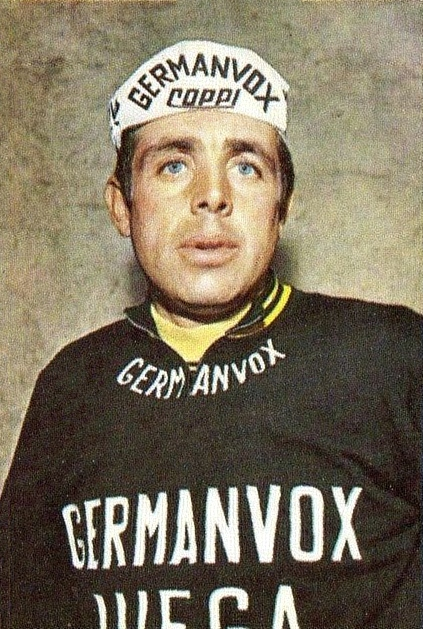
- Reybrouck in 1970

Personal information
- Full name: Guido Reybrouck
- Born: 25 December 1941 (age 84) Bruges, Belgium

Cycling career
- Sport: Cycling
- Current team: Retired
- Discipline: Road
- Role: Rider
- Rider type: Sprinter

Professional teams
- 1965: Flandria–Romeo
- 1966–1967: Roméo–Smith's
- 1968–1969: Faema
- 1970: Germanvox–Wega
- 1971–1972: Salvarani
- 1973: Novy–Total
- 1974: Filcas

Major wins
- Grand Tours Tour de France 6 individual stages (1965–1967, 1969) Giro d'Italia 3 individual stages (1968) Vuelta a España Points classification (1970) Combination classification (1970) 4 individual stages (1967, 1970) One-day races and Classics National Road Race Championships (1966) Amstel Gold Race (1969)

Guido Reybrouck (born 25 December 1941) is a Belgian former road bicycle racer. He is an older brother of Wilfried Reybrouck and the cousin of Gustave Danneels.

== Major results ==
1964
1st Paris–Tours
1st Züri-Metzgete
1st Stage 2 Tour de l'Oise
2nd Overall Tour du Nord
2nd Overall Tour du Loir-et-Cher

1st Stage 1

1965
1st Kuurne–Brussels–Kuurne
Tour de France

1st Stages 6 & 10

1st Stage 5 Tour of Belgium
2nd Overall Paris–Luxembourg
2nd Omloop van het Leiedal
4th Paris–Tours
6th Omloop Het Volk
6th GP de Fourmies
8th Milan–San Remo
9th De Kustpijl
1966
1st Road race, National Road Championships
1st Paris–Tours
1st Stage 2 Tour de France
2nd Omloop der Vlaamse Ardennen Ichtegem
4th Tour of Flanders
7th Road race, UCI Road World Championships
7th Paris–Brussels
1967
1st Elfstedenronde
Tour de France

1st Stages 4 & 9

1st Stage 1 Vuelta a España
Paris–Nice

1st Stages 1 & 3

7th Tour of Flanders
10th De Kustpijl
1968
1st Paris–Tours
1st Circuit des Frontières
Giro d'Italia

1st Stages 3, 11 & 22

Paris–Luxembourg

1st Stage 2 & 3a (TTT)

Setmana Catalana de Ciclisme

1st Stages 2 & 4

1st Stage 1 Volta a Catalunya
1st Stage 3 Giro di Sardegna
3rd Road race, National Road Championships
3rd GP Flandria
9th Paris–Roubaix
1969
1st Amstel Gold Race
1st Barcelona–Andorra
1st Stage 13 Tour de France
1st Stage 1 Setmana Catalana de Ciclisme
4th Road race, UCI Road World Championships
8th Züri-Metzgete
1970
Vuelta a España

1st Points classification
1st Combination classification
1st Stages 4, 8 & 10

1st Stage 7a Paris–Nice
1st Stage 3 Giro di Sardegna
2nd Overall Paris–Luxembourg
2nd Milano–Torino
3rd Paris–Tours
10th Milan–San Remo
1971
1st Overall Tour de la Nouvelle-France
1st Stage 4b Giro di Sardegna
1st Stage 3 Tirreno–Adriatico
1st Stage 4 Volta a Catalunya
2nd GP Alghero
3rd GP Stad Zottegem
7th E3 Prijs Vlaanderen
8th Omloop Het Volk
1972
1st Overall Tour de la Nouvelle-France

1st Stage 1

1st GP Cemab
Vuelta a Levante

1st Stages 4 & 5

3rd Elfstedenronde
6th Paris–Tours
1973
1st Stage 2 Tour de l'Oise
6th De Kustpijl
1974
5th Omloop van de Vlaamse Scheldeboorden
