= José Antonio Pontón =

Spanish cyclist

Personal information
- Born: 22 February 1942 (age 84)

Cycling career
- Sport: Cycling
- Role: Rider

José Antonio Pontón (born 22 February 1942) is a Spanish racing cyclist. He rode in the 1974 Tour de France.
