= Luis Balagué =

Spanish cyclist (1944–2021)

Personal information
- Full name: Luis Balagué Carreño
- Born: 29 March 1944 Oviedo, Spain
- Died: 18 February 2021 (aged 76) Mieres, Spain

Cycling career
- Sport: Cycling
- Discipline: Road
- Role: Rider

Major wins
- Vuelta a España, 1 stage

Luis Balagué Carreño (29 March 1944 – 18 February 2021) was a Spanish professional road bicycle racer.

== Career ==
He was a professional between 1969 and 1977 and won stage 11 in the 1972 Vuelta a España.

== Palmarès ==
1969
1st, Stage 2a, Vuelta a los Valles Mineros
1972
1st, Stage 11, Vuelta a España, Zaragoza
1976
1st, Stage 1, Vuelta a los Valles Mineros
