= Luis Santamarina =

Spanish cyclist

Personal information
- Born: 25 June 1942 Gallarta, Biscay, Spain
- Died: 6 February 2017 (aged 74)

Cycling career
- Sport: Cycling
- Discipline: Road

Luis Santamarina (25 June 1942 – 6 February 2017) was a Spanish cyclist. He competed in the team time trial at the 1964 Summer Olympics. He also rode in four editions of the Tour de France. He died on 6 February 2017, aged 74.

== Major results ==
1966
9th Overall Vuelta a Andalucía

1st Stage 4

1967
1st Road race, National Road Championships
3rd Overall Tour de Suisse
1968
1st Stage 16 Vuelta a España
1st Stage 20 Giro d'Italia
2nd Overall Setmana Catalana de Ciclisme
4th Trofeo Dicen
8th Trofeo Juan Fina
1970
1st Overall Tour of the Basque Country
1st Overall Vuelta a Aragón

1st Stage 4a

9th Overall Vuelta a España

1st Stage 5

9th Overall Vuelta a los Valles Mineros
1971
2nd Overall Vuelta a Asturias
9th Overall Tour of the Basque Country
1972
1st Overall Vuelta a los Valles Mineros

1st Stage 2a

1st Stage 1 GP Leganes
2nd Overall Vuelta Ciclista a La Rioja
2nd Overall Vuelta a Asturias
8th Overall Volta a Catalunya
