= Roger Rosiers =

Belgian cyclist

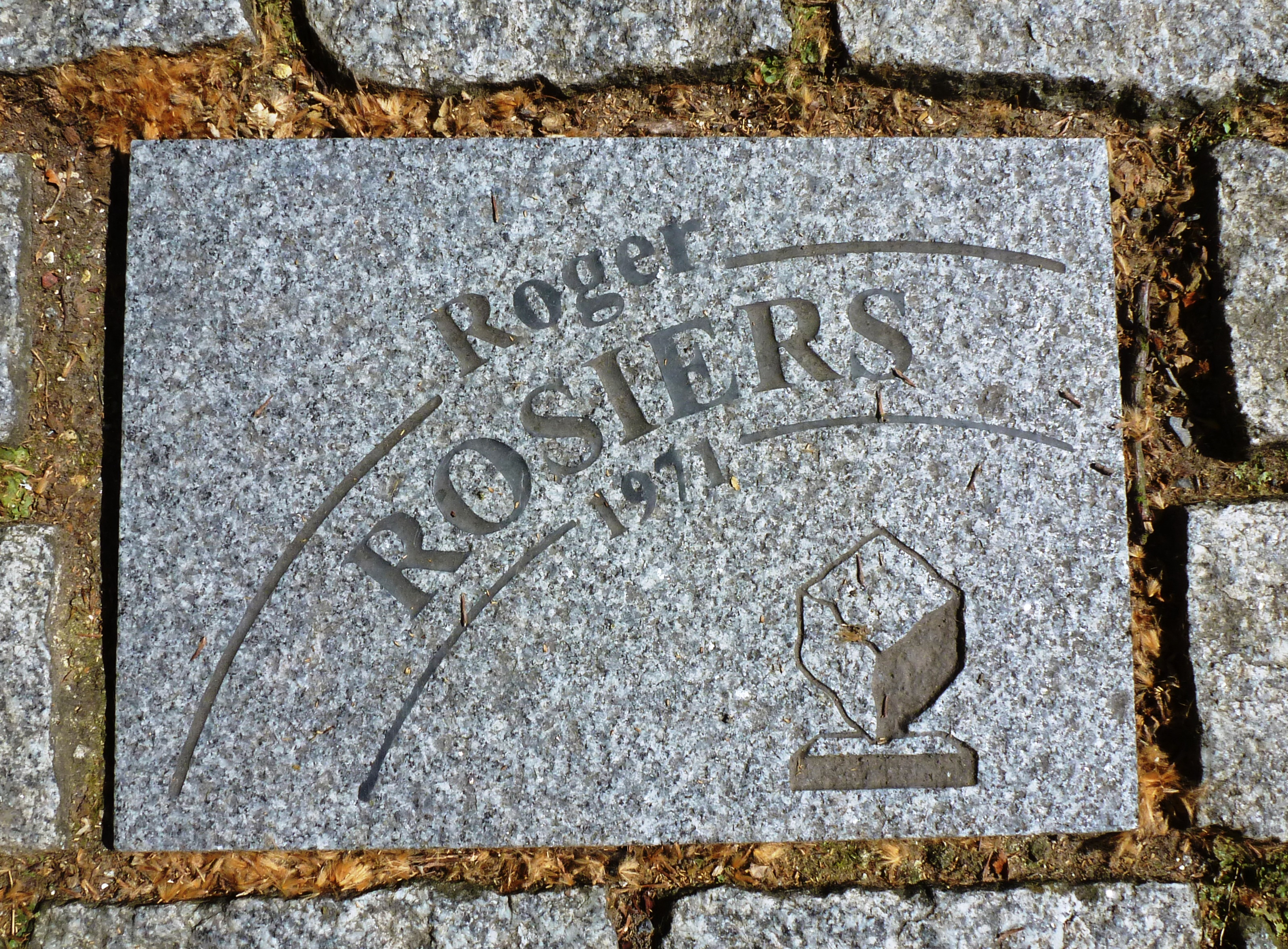

Personal information
- Full name: Roger Rosiers
- Born: 26 November 1946 (age 79) Vremde, Belgium

Cycling career
- Sport: Cycling
- Current team: Retired
- Discipline: Road
- Role: Rider

Professional teams
- 1967–1969: Mann-Grundig
- 1970–1973: BiC
- 1974: Molteni
- 1975–1976: Super Ser
- 1977: Frison-Thirion-Gazelle
- 1978: Peugeot-Esso-Michelin
- 1979–1980: La Redoute-Motobécane

Major wins
- Paris–Roubaix (1971); Vuelta a España, 1 stage

Roger Rosiers (26 November 1946) is a former professional road racing cyclist from Vremde, Belgium.

== Major achievements ==
1965
1st, Schaal Sels-Merksem
1967
1st, Brabantse Pijl
1968
1st, GP Flandria
1969
1st, Nokere Koerse
1st, Stage 2b, Tour of Belgium
1970
1st, Stage 17, Vuelta a España
1971
1st, Paris–Roubaix
1972
1st, Overall, Tour de Luxembourg

1st, Stage 1

1973
1st, Grand Prix d'Isbergues
1977
1st, Overall, Three Days of De Panne
