= Eduardo Castelló =

Spanish cyclist (1940–2020)

Personal information
- Full name: Eduardo Castelló Vilanova
- Born: 4 March 1940 La Vall d'Uixó, Spain
- Died: 31 October 2020 (aged 80)

Cycling career
- Sport: Cycling
- Current team: Retired
- Discipline: Road
- Role: Rider

Professional teams
- 1965–1968: Ferrys
- 1969: Kas–Kaskol
- 1970–1972: Karpy–Licor
- 1973: Louletano

Major wins
- Grand Tours Vuelta a España 1 individual stage (1968) One-day races and Classics National Road Race Championships (1971)

Eduardo Castelló Vilanova (4 March 1940 – 31 October 2020) was a Spanish professional racing cyclist. He rode in three editions of the Tour de France and eight of the Vuelta a España, notably winning a stage in 1968, as well as finishing 13th in the 1972 edition. He also won the Spanish National Road Race Championships and the Vuelta Asturias in 1971, as well as the Vuelta a los Valles Mineros in 1968.

Castelló died on 31 October 2020, at the age of 80.

== Major results ==
1965
7th Overall Critérium du Dauphiné Libéré
1967
1st Subida a Arrate
1968
1st Overall Vuelta a los Valles Mineros

1st Stage 2a

1st Stage 14 Vuelta a España
1st Stage 6 Vuelta a la Comunidad Valenciana
8th Overall Volta a Catalunya
1969
2nd Subida a Arrate
5th Overall Tour of the Basque Country
1970
2nd Subida a Arrate
1971
1st Road race, National Road Championships
1st Overall Vuelta Asturias

1st Stage 2

1972
2nd Gran Premio Nuestra Señora de Oro
6th Overall Volta a Catalunya
