= Jan van Katwijk =

Dutch cyclist

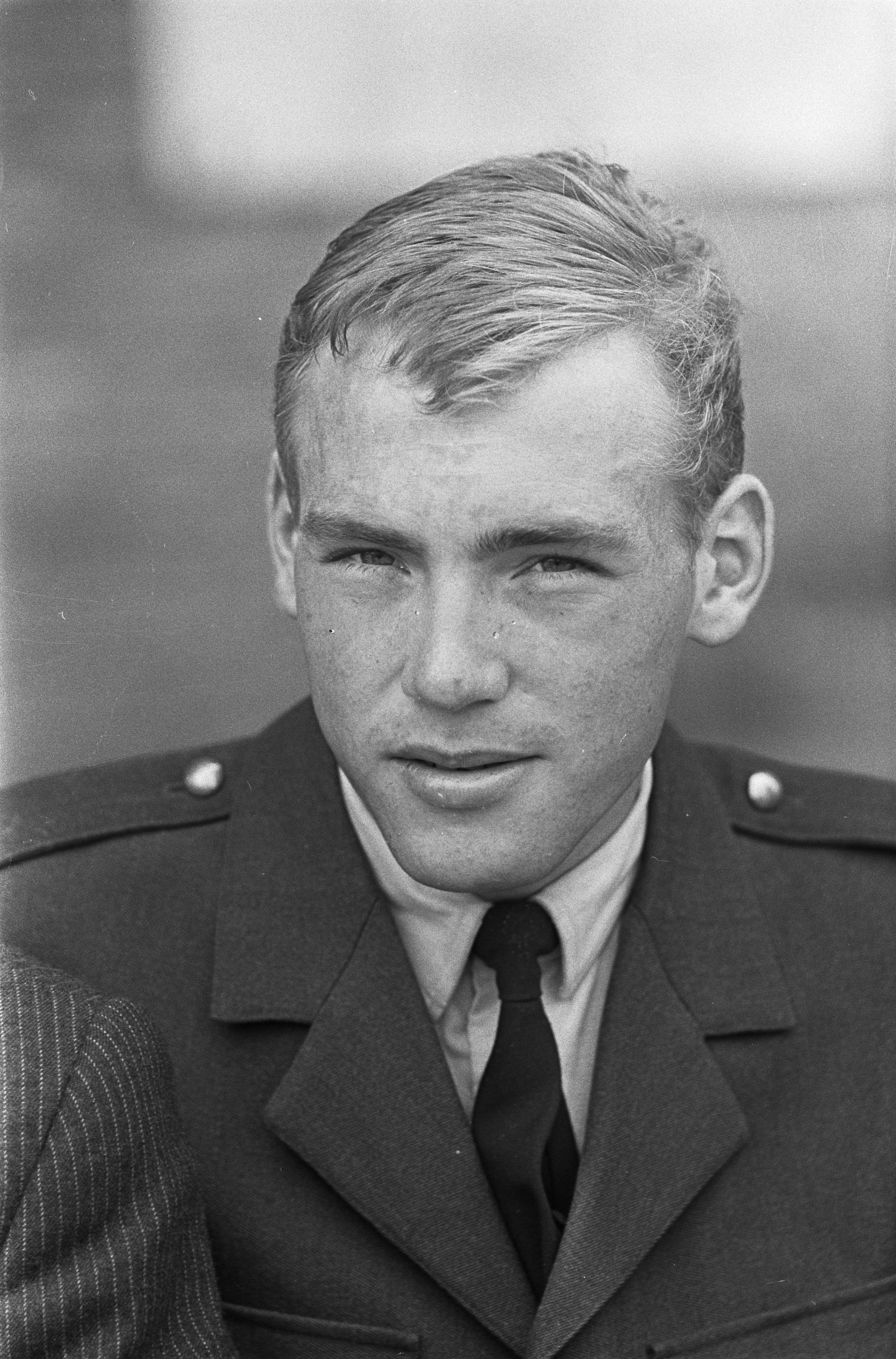
- Jan van Katwijk in 1967

Personal information
- Born: 30 August 1946 (age 79) Oploo, the Netherlands

Sport
- Sport: Cycling

Jan van Katwijk (born 30 August 1946) is a retired Dutch cyclist who was active between 1965 and 1978. He won a number of races including Ronde van Drenthe (1968), Acht van Chaam (1969) and national road championships (1972) as well as one stage of Vuelta a Andalucía (1970) and Tour de France (1976). As an army serviceman he won the national military championships in 1967.

His son Alain, niece Nathalie, younger brothers Piet and Fons as well as son-in-law Bram Schmitz were also professional cyclists.
