= Nemesio Jiménez =

Spanish cyclist

Personal information
- Born: 10 February 1946 (age 80) Toledo, Spain

Cycling career
- Sport: Cycling

Nemesio Jiménez (born 10 February 1946) is a Spanish former cyclist. He competed in the team time trial at the 1968 Summer Olympics.
