= Willem II–Gazelle =

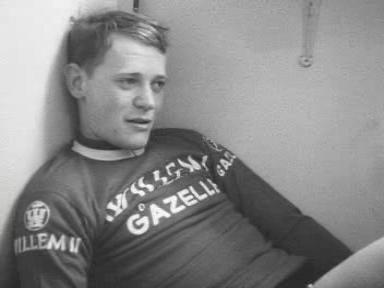
- René Pijnen in 1969

Team information
- Registered: Netherlands
- Founded: 1966
- Disbanded: 1971
- Discipline: Road
- Bicycles: Gazelle

Key personnel
- General manager: Ton Vissers

Team name history
- 1966–1970 1971: Willem II–Gazelle; Gazelle
Willem II–Gazelle jersey
Jersey

Willem II–Gazelle was a Dutch professional cycling team that existed from 1966 to 1971. Its main sponsor was Dutch cigar maker Willem II and the co-sponsor was bicycle manufacturer Gazelle. Their most successful rider was Rik Van Looy, whose most notable wins with the team were the 1967 Paris–Tours, the 1968 La Flèche Wallonne and the 1969 E3 Prijs Vlaanderen. Harry Steevens won the 1968 Amstel Gold Race with the team.
