= Karpy =

Spanish cycling team (1967–1972)

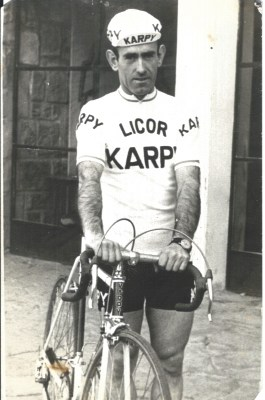
- Alfredo Irusta wearing the team's jersey

Team information
- Registered: Spain
- Founded: 1967
- Disbanded: 1972
- Discipline: Road

Key personnel
- Team manager: Julio San Emeterio

Team name history
- 1967–1969 1970 1971 1972: Karpy; Karpy–Licor; Karpy; Karpy–Licor

Karpy was a Spanish professional cycling team that existed from 1967 to 1972.

The team was selected to race in six editions of the Vuelta a España, where they achieved four stage wins.

== Major wins ==
1968
Vuelta a España

Stages 8 & 18, Manuel Martín Piñera

1969
Subida a Arrate, Domingo Fernández
Vuelta a España

Stage 10, Manuel Martín Piñera

1970
Vuelta a España

Stage 2, Julián Cuevas

1971
Overall Vuelta a Asturias, Eduardo Castelló
Overall Vuelta a Cantabria, Gonzalo Aja
1972
Subida a Arrate, Gonzalo Aja
