= José Gómez (cyclist) =

Spanish cyclist (1944–2014)

José Gómez Lucas
Personal information
- Born: 9 January 1944 Madrid, Spain
- Died: 14 June 2014 (aged 70) Madrid, Spain

Cycling career
- Sport: Cycling

José Gómez Lucas (9 January 1944 – 14 June 2014) was a Spanish cyclist. He competed at the 1968 Summer Olympics, finishing 15th overall in the individual road race and 12th overall with the Spanish team in the team time trial. As a professional, Gómez was the overall general classification winner of the 1970 Vuelta a Andalucía, the 1971 Tour de Menorca and the 1972 Klasika Primavera. He retired from racing after the 1975 Vuelta a España.

== Major results ==
1966
1st in 2nd Stage Tour de l'Avenir
1968
1st in 7th Stage Giro della Valle d'Aosta
1970
1st Overall General classification Vuelta a Andalucía
1st Overall Sprint classification Volta a Catalunya
1971
1st Overall General classification Tour de Menorca
1st in 1st Stage Tour de Menorca
1972
1st Overall General classification Klasika Primavera
