= Rini Wagtmans =

Dutch cyclist (1946–2026)

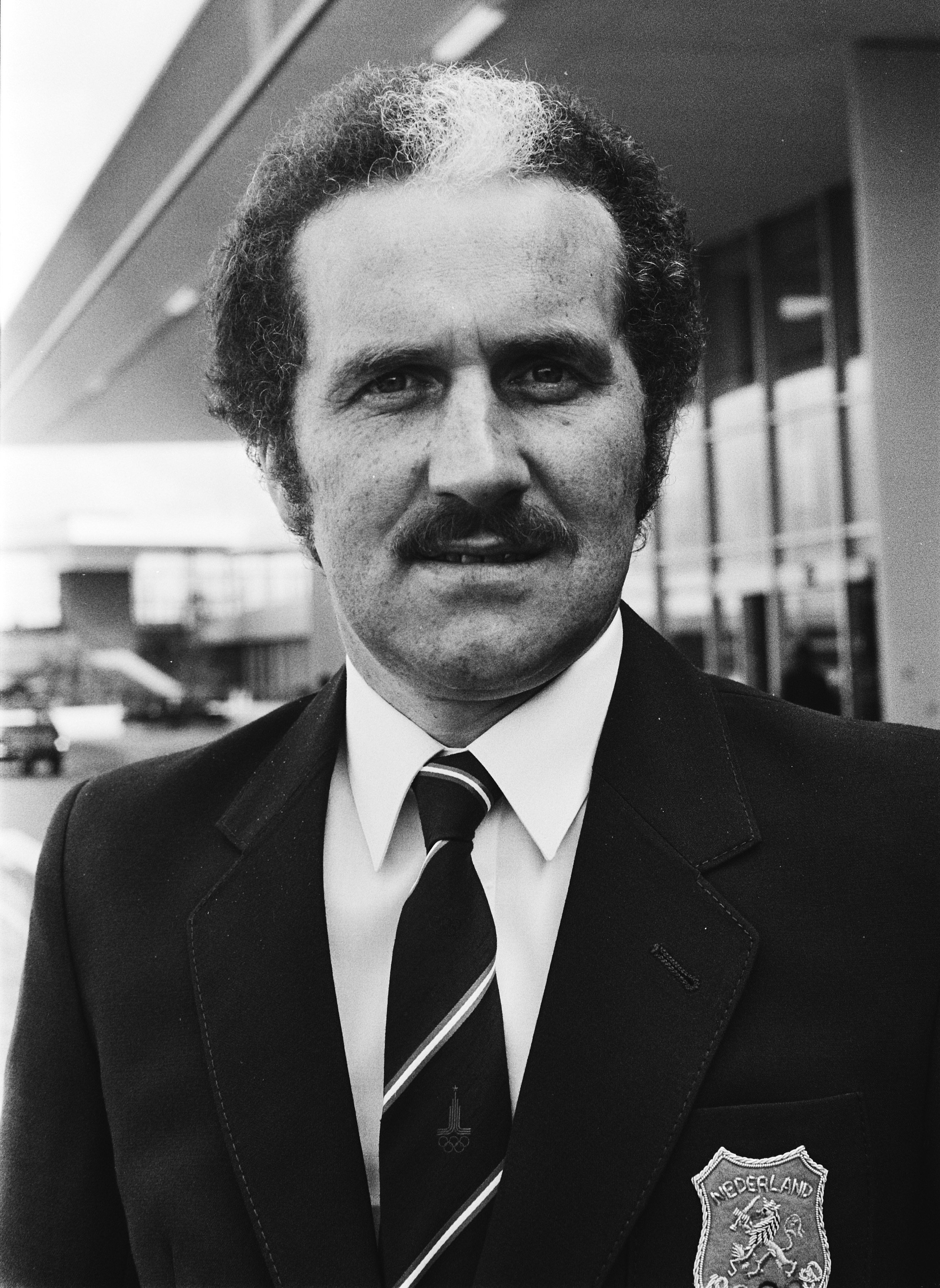
- Wagtmans in 1980

Personal information
- Full name: Marinus Wagtmans
- Born: 26 December 1946 Sint Willebrord, Netherlands
- Died: 25 September 2026 (aged 79) Sint Willebrord, Netherlands

Cycling career
- Sport: Cycling
- Discipline: Road
- Role: Rider

Major wins
- 3 stages of Tour de France
Medal record
Men's road bicycle racing
Representing the Netherlands
World Championships
Silver medal – second place	1966 Nürburgring	Team time trial

Marinus "Rini" Wagtmans (26 December 1946 – 25 September 2026) was a Dutch professional road bicycle racer.

== Biography ==
Wagtmans was the nephew of Wout Wagtmans, a retired professional bicycle racer who won the Tour de Romandie stage race in 1952. His father was a masseur while Tour de France stage winner Wim van Est was his neighbour. In 1968 Rini turned professional. The following year he finished third overall in the 1969 Vuelta a España. He rode four editions of the Tour de France and won three stages, one in 1970, one in 1971 and one in 1972. In the 1970 Tour de France he finished fifth overall. In 1971 Tour de France while riding for Molteni, he wore the yellow jersey as leader of the general classification for one day but teammate and team leader Eddy Merckx took the jersey the following day. He also won two stages in the 1970 Vuelta a España. Wagtmans was known as one of the best descenders in the peloton. His hair earned him the nickname "witte bles", which translates as "white blaze". Wagtmans ended his career early due to heart problems. Afterwards he was a cycling coach, a member of the Royal Dutch Cycling Union, and then a successful businessman. In 2005, Wagtmans was invested as a Knight of the Order of Orange-Nassau. In 2006, Wagtmans’ biography was published.

He was involved in establishing the Kazakh cycling team Astana, which he left in 2009. A year later, he was appointed an honorary consul for Kazakhstan.

Wagtmans was also an honorary citizen of Rucphen, the municipality that includes his hometown Sint Willebrord.

Rini Wagtmans died on 25 September 2026, at the age of 79.

== Major results ==
1966
Ronde van Midden-Zeeland
1967
Tour of Austria
1968
Roosendaal (NED)
Acht van Chaam
1969
Sint-Willebrord
Ulvenhout
Kortenhoef
Tour de France:

6th place overall classification

1970
Vuelta a España:

Winner stages 11 and 13

Koksijde
Tour de France:

Winner stage 15
5th place overall classification

Plumeliau
1971
Sint-Willebrord
Tour de France:

Winner stage 3
Wearing yellow jersey for one day

Acht van Chaam
1972
Tour de France:

Winner stage 18

== See also ==
- List of Dutch cyclists who have led the Tour de France general classification
