= La Casera–Peña Bahamontes =

Spanish cycling team (1968–1974)

Team information
- Registered: Spain
- Founded: 1968
- Disbanded: 1974
- Discipline: Road
- Bicycles: Bahamontes

Team name history
- 1968–1974: La Casera–Peña Bahamontes

La Casera–Peña Bahamontes was a Spanish professional cycling team that existed from 1968 to 1974. Pedro Torres won the mountains classification in the 1973 Tour de France with the team.
