= Agustín Tamames =

Spanish cyclist

Personal information
- Full name: Agustín Tamames Iglesias
- Born: 19 October 1944 (age 81) Monterrubio de Armuña, Spain
- Height: 173 cm (5 ft 8 in)
- Weight: 66 kg (146 lb)

Cycling career
- Sport: Cycling
- Current team: Retired
- Discipline: Road
- Role: Rider

Major wins
- 1975 Vuelta a España

Agustín Tamames Iglesias (Note: In this Spanish name, the first or paternal surname is Tamames and the second or maternal family name is Iglesias.) (born 19 October 1944) is a former Spanish road racing cyclist. In 1975, he won the overall title and five stages of the Vuelta a España. Over his entire career, Tamames won 11 stage wins at the Vuelta a España. He also competed in the individual road race at the 1968 Summer Olympics.

== Major achievements ==
1970

- 2nd, Overall, Vuelta a España
  - 1st, KoM
  - 1st, Stage 9

1971

- 7th, Overall, Vuelta a España
- 1st, Stage 9

1972

- 3rd, Overall, Vuelta a España
  - 1st, Stage 13
  - 1st, Stage 16

1974

- 17th, Overall, Vuelta a España
  - 1st, Stage 17
  - 1st, Stage 18

1975

- 1st, Overall, Vuelta a España
  - 1st, Stage 3
  - 1st, Stage 12
  - 1st, Stage 14
  - 1st, Stage 15
  - 1st, Stage 16
- 3rd, Overall, Tour of the Basque Country
  - 1st, Stage 1
  - 1st, Stage 4

1976

- Spain National Road Race Champion
