= Werner (cycling team) =

Team information
- Registered: Spain
- Founded: 1969
- Disbanded: 1972
- Discipline: Road

Team name history
- 1969–1972: Werner

Werner was a Spanish professional cycling team that existed from 1969 to 1972. It participated in the 1971 Tour de France.
