= List of teams and cyclists in the 1971 Tour de France =

List of cyclists

The 1971 Tour de France started with the following 13 teams, each with 10 cyclists:

The number of riders per nation that participated in the 1971 Tour de France: 30+ / 20–29 / 10–19 / 0–9

Eddy Merckx, who had won the 1969 and 1970 Tours, was the big favourite. Pre-race predictions were certain that if he would not become ill or crash, Merckx would be the winner, and were speculating whether he would be able to lead the race from start to end.

With fewer flat stages, fewer time trials and more mountain stages, it was thought that climbers would have an advantage.

== Teams ==
- Molteni (riders)
- Flandria–Mars (riders)
- Ferretti (riders)
- Sonolor–Lejeune (riders)
- Fagor–Mercier–Hutchinson (riders)
- Salvarani (riders)
- Kas–Kaskol (riders)
- Peugeot–BP–Michelin (riders)
- Hoover–de Gribaldy–Wolber (riders)
- Bic (riders)
- Scic (riders)
- Goudsmit–Hoff (riders)
- Werner (riders)

== Cyclists ==
Legend
No.	Starting number worn by the rider during the Tour
Pos.	Position in the general classification
Time	Deficit to the winner of the general classification
*	Denotes the winner of the general classification
†	Denotes the winner of the points classification
DNS	Denotes a rider who did not start a stage, followed by the stage before which he withdrew
DNF	Denotes a rider who did not finish a stage, followed by the stage in which he withdrew
HD	Denotes a rider who finished outside the time limit, followed by the stage in which he did so
Age correct as of 26 June 1971, the date on which the Tour began

=== By starting number ===
No.	Name	Nationality	Team	Pos.	Ref
1	Eddy Merckx	Belgium	Molteni	1	
2	Joseph Bruyère	Belgium	Molteni	60	
3	Jos Huysmans	Belgium	Molteni	27	
4	Frans Mintjens	Belgium	Molteni	57	
5	Jozef Spruyt	Belgium	Molteni	44	
6	Julien Stevens	Belgium	Molteni	90	
7	Roger Swerts	Belgium	Molteni	35	
8	Victor Van Schil	Belgium	Molteni	21	
9	Herman Van Springel	Belgium	Molteni	14	
10	Rini Wagtmans	Netherlands	Molteni	16	
11	Erik De Vlaeminck	Belgium	Flandria–Mars	62	
12	Roger De Vlaeminck	Belgium	Flandria–Mars	DNF	
13	Edward Janssens	Belgium	Flandria–Mars	75	
14	Eric Leman	Belgium	Flandria–Mars	91	
15	Marc Lievens	Belgium	Flandria–Mars	DNF	
16	Pieter Nassen	Belgium	Flandria–Mars	93	
17	Edy Schütz	Luxembourg	Flandria–Mars	55	
18	Tino Tabak	Netherlands	Flandria–Mars	DNF	
19	Willy Van Neste	Belgium	Flandria–Mars	70	
20	Joop Zoetemelk	Netherlands	Flandria–Mars	2	
21	Mario Anni	Italy	Ferretti	DNF	
22	Roberto Ballini	Italy	Ferretti	92	
23	Pietro Campagnari	Italy	Ferretti	DNF	
24	Lino Farisato	Italy	Ferretti	DNF	
25	Wilmo Francioni	Italy	Ferretti	64	
26	Gösta Pettersson	Sweden	Ferretti	DNF	
27	Tomas Pettersson	Sweden	Ferretti	DNF	
28	Sandro Quintarelli	Italy	Ferretti	85	
29	Mauro Simonetti	Italy	Ferretti	19	
30	Albert Van Vlierberghe	Belgium	Ferretti	29	
31	Lucien Aimar	France	Sonolor–Lejeune	9	
32	Gilbert Bellone	France	Sonolor–Lejeune	DNF	
33	José Catieau	France	Sonolor–Lejeune	43	
34	Bernard Guyot	France	Sonolor–Lejeune	28	
35	Barry Hoban	Great Britain	Sonolor–Lejeune	40	
36	Robert Mintkiewicz	France	Sonolor–Lejeune	84	
37	Raymond Riotte	France	Sonolor–Lejeune	34	
38	Jean-Jacques Sanquer	France	Sonolor–Lejeune	54	
39	Willy Teirlinck	Belgium	Sonolor–Lejeune	74	
40	Lucien Van Impe	Belgium	Sonolor–Lejeune	3	
41	Georges Chappe	France	Fagor–Mercier–Hutchinson	94	
42	François Coquery	France	Fagor–Mercier–Hutchinson	56	
43	Régis Delépine	France	Fagor–Mercier–Hutchinson	DNF	
44	Jean-Pierre Genet	France	Fagor–Mercier–Hutchinson	26	
45	René Grelin	France	Fagor–Mercier–Hutchinson	81	
46	Cyrille Guimard	France	Fagor–Mercier–Hutchinson	7	
47	Eddy Peelman	Belgium	Fagor–Mercier–Hutchinson	88	
48	Michel Périn	France	Fagor–Mercier–Hutchinson	23	
49	Gerard Vianen	Netherlands	Fagor–Mercier–Hutchinson	DNF	
50	Rolf Wolfshohl	West Germany	Fagor–Mercier–Hutchinson	71	
51	Ottavio Crepaldi	Italy	Salvarani	25	
52	Silvano Davo	Italy	Salvarani	86	
53	Tommaso de Pra	Italy	Salvarani	DNF	
54	Ercole Gualazzini	Italy	Salvarani	DNF	
55	Pietro Guerra	Italy	Salvarani	68	
56	Virginio Levati	Italy	Salvarani	DNF	
57	Primo Mori	Italy	Salvarani	12	
58	Gianni Motta	Italy	Salvarani	DNF	
59	Guido Reybrouck	Belgium	Salvarani	DNF	
60	Georges Vandenberghe	Belgium	Salvarani	42	
61	José Manuel Fuente	Spain	Kas–Kaskol	72	
62	Francisco Javier Galdeano	Spain	Kas–Kaskol	73	
63	Francisco Galdós	Spain	Kas–Kaskol	11	
64	Andrés Gandarias	Spain	Kas–Kaskol	DNF	
65	Nemesio Jiménez	Spain	Kas–Kaskol	61	
66	Vicente López Carril	Spain	Kas–Kaskol	10	
67	Jesús Manzaneque	Spain	Kas–Kaskol	53	
68	Gabriel Mascaró Febrer	Spain	Kas–Kaskol	38	
69	José Luis Uribezubia	Spain	Kas–Kaskol	49	
70	Luis Zubero	Spain	Kas–Kaskol	DNF	
71	Robert Bouloux	France	Peugeot–BP–Michelin	41	
72	Ferdinand Bracke	Belgium	Peugeot–BP–Michelin	58	
73	Jean-Pierre Danguillaume	France	Peugeot–BP–Michelin	18	
74	Wilfried David	Belgium	Peugeot–BP–Michelin	DNF	
75	Raymond Delisle	France	Peugeot–BP–Michelin	77	
76	Jean Dumont	France	Peugeot–BP–Michelin	20	
77	Walter Godefroot	Belgium	Peugeot–BP–Michelin	DNF	
78	Pierre Martelozzo	France	Peugeot–BP–Michelin	89	
79	Christian Raymond	France	Peugeot–BP–Michelin	32	
80	Bernard Thévenet	France	Peugeot–BP–Michelin	4	
81	Joaquim Agostinho	Portugal	Hoover–de Gribaldy–Wolber	5	
82	Jacques Botherel	France	Hoover–de Gribaldy–Wolber	DNF	
83	Jean-Claude Daunat	France	Hoover–de Gribaldy–Wolber	46	
84	Albert Fritz	West Germany	Hoover–de Gribaldy–Wolber	DNF	
85	Pierre Ghisellini	France	Hoover–de Gribaldy–Wolber	79	
86	Mariano Martínez	France	Hoover–de Gribaldy–Wolber	31	
87	Yves Ravaleu	France	Hoover–de Gribaldy–Wolber	69	
88	Pierre Rivory	France	Hoover–de Gribaldy–Wolber	DNF	
89	Kurt Rub	Switzerland	Hoover–de Gribaldy–Wolber	47	
90	Jean Vidament	France	Hoover–de Gribaldy–Wolber	51	
91	Roland Berland	France	Bic	37	
92	Francis Ducreux	France	Bic	36	
93	Jean-Claude Genty	France	Bic	39	
94	Charly Grosskost	France	Bic	48	
95	Bernard Labourdette	France	Bic	8	
96	Désiré Letort	France	Bic	17	
97	Leif Mortensen	Denmark	Bic	6	
98	Luis Ocaña	Spain	Bic	DNF	
99	Johny Schleck	Luxembourg	Bic	22	
100	Alain Vasseur	France	Bic	65	
101	Luciano Armani	Italy	Scic	66	
102	Franco Balmamion	Italy	Scic	DNF	
103	Attilio Benfatto	Italy	Scic	DNF	
104	Davide Boifava	Italy	Scic	DNF	
105	Tino Conti	Italy	Scic	DNF	
106	Claudio Michelotto	Italy	Scic	DNF	
107	Enrico Paolini	Italy	Scic	DNF	
108	Adriano Pella	Italy	Scic	78	
109	Celestino Vercelli	Italy	Scic	83	
110	Paolo Zini	Italy	Scic	DNF	
111	Henk Benjamins	Netherlands	Goudsmit–Hoff	80	
112	Matthijs de Koning	Netherlands	Goudsmit–Hoff	76	
113	Gerard Harings	Netherlands	Goudsmit–Hoff	82	
114	Gerben Karstens	Netherlands	Goudsmit–Hoff	63	
115	Jan Krekels	Netherlands	Goudsmit–Hoff	50	
116	Wim Prinsen	Netherlands	Goudsmit–Hoff	59	
117	Cees Rentmeester	Netherlands	Goudsmit–Hoff	DNF	
118	Harry Steevens	Netherlands	Goudsmit–Hoff	DNF	
119	Jos van der Vleuten	Netherlands	Goudsmit–Hoff	30	
120	Jan van Katwijk	Netherlands	Goudsmit–Hoff	87	
121	Luis Balague	Spain	Werner	45	
122	José Casas	Spain	Werner	DNF	
123	Ventura Díaz	Spain	Werner	33	
124	José Gómez	Spain	Werner	DNF	
125	José Grande	Spain	Werner	DNF	
126	José Manuel López Rodríguez	Spain	Werner	52	
127	Antonio Martos	Spain	Werner	13	
128	Luis Santamarina	Spain	Werner	24	
129	Agustín Tamames	Spain	Werner	15	
130	Francisco Julia	Spain	Werner	67	

=== By team ===
Molteni
No.	Rider	Pos.
1	Eddy Merckx (BEL)	1
2	Joseph Bruyère (BEL)	60
3	Jos Huysmans (BEL)	27
4	Frans Mintjens (BEL)	57
5	Jozef Spruyt (BEL)	44
6	Julien Stevens (BEL)	90
7	Roger Swerts (BEL)	35
8	Victor Van Schil (BEL)	21
9	Herman Van Springel (BEL)	14
10	Marinus Wagtmans (NED)	16
Directeur sportif: Guillaume Driessens

Flandria–Mars
No.	Rider	Pos.
11	Erik De Vlaeminck (BEL)	62
12	Roger De Vlaeminck (BEL)	DNF
13	Edward Janssens (BEL)	75
14	Eric Leman (BEL)	91
15	Marc Lievens (BEL)	DNF
16	Pieter Nassen (BEL)	93
17	Edy Schütz (LUX)	55
18	Tino Tabak (NED)	DNF
19	Willy Van Neste (BEL)	70
20	Joop Zoetemelk (NED)	2
Directeur sportif: Briek Schotte

Ferretti
No.	Rider	Pos.
21	Mario Anni (ITA)	DNF
22	Roberto Ballini (ITA)	92
23	Pietro Campagnari (ITA)	DNF
24	Lino Farisato (ITA)	DNF
25	Wilmo Francioni (ITA)	64
26	Gösta Pettersson (SWE)	DNF
27	Tomas Pettersson (SWE)	DNF
28	Sandro Quitarelli (ITA)	85
29	Mauro Simonetti (ITA)	19
30	Albert Van Vlierberghe (BEL)	29
Directeur sportif: Alfredo Martini

Sonolor–Lejeune
No.	Rider	Pos.
31	Lucien Aimar (FRA)	9
32	Gilbert Bellone (FRA)	DNF
33	José Catieau (FRA)	43
34	Bernard Guyot (FRA)	28
35	Barry Hoban (GBR)	40
36	Robert Mintkiewicz (FRA)	84
37	Raymond Riotte (FRA)	34
38	Jean-Jacques Sanquer (FRA)	54
39	Willy Teirlinck (BEL)	74
40	Lucien Van Impe (BEL)	3
Directeur sportif: Jean Stablinski

Fagor–Mercier–Hutchinson
No.	Rider	Pos.
41	Georges Chappe (FRA)	94
42	François Cocquery (FRA)	56
43	Régis Delépine (FRA)	DNF
44	Jean-Pierre Genet (FRA)	26
45	René Grelin (FRA)	81
46	Cyrille Guimard (FRA)	7
47	Eddy Peelman (BEL)	88
48	Michel Périn (FRA)	23
49	Gerard Vianen (NED)	DNF
50	Rolf Wolfshohl (FRG)	71
Directeur sportif: Louis Caput

Salvarani
No.	Rider	Pos.
51	Ottavio Crepaldi (ITA)	25
52	Silvano Davo (ITA)	86
53	Tommaso de Pra (ITA)	DNF
54	Ercole Gualazzini (ITA)	DNF
55	Pietro Guerra (ITA)	68
56	Virginio Levati (ITA)	DNF
57	Primo Mori (ITA)	12
58	Gianni Motta (ITA)	DNF
59	Guido Reybrouck (BEL)	DNF
60	Georges Vandenberghe (BEL)	42
Directeur sportif: Vittorio Adorni

Kas–Kaskol
No.	Rider	Pos.
61	José Manuel Fuente (ESP)	72
62	Francisco Javier Galdeano (ESP)	73
63	Francisco Galdós (ESP)	11
64	Andrés Gandarias (ESP)	DNF
65	Nemesio Jiménez (ESP)	61
66	Vicente López Carril (ESP)	10
67	Jesús Manzaneque (ESP)	53
68	Gabriel Mascaró Febrer (ESP)	38
69	José Luis Uribezubia (ESP)	49
70	Luis Zubero (ESP)	DNF
Directeur sportif: Dalmacio Langarica

Peugeot–BP–Michelin
No.	Rider	Pos.
71	Robert Bouloux (FRA)	41
72	Ferdinand Bracke (BEL)	58
73	Jean-Pierre Danguillaume (FRA)	18
74	Wilfried David (BEL)	DNF
75	Raymond Delisle (FRA)	77
76	Jean Dumont (FRA)	20
77	Walter Godefroot (BEL)	DNF
78	Pierre Martelozzo (FRA)	89
79	Christian Raymond (FRA)	32
80	Bernard Thévenet (FRA)	4
Directeur sportif: Gaston Plaud

Hoover–de Gribaldy–Wolber
No.	Rider	Pos.
81	Joaquim Agostinho (POR)	5
82	Jacques Botherel (FRA)	DNF
83	Jean-Claude Daunat (FRA)	46
84	Albert Fritz (FRG)	DNF
85	Pierre Ghisellini (FRA)	79
86	Mariano Martínez (FRA)	31
87	Yves Ravaleu (FRA)	69
88	Pierre Rivory (FRA)	DNF
89	Kurt Rub (SUI)	47
90	Jean Vidament (FRA)	51
Directeur sportif: Raphaël Géminiani

Bic
No.	Rider	Pos.
91	Roland Berland (FRA)	37
92	Francis Ducreux (FRA)	36
93	Jean-Claude Genty (FRA)	39
94	Charly Grosskost (FRA)	48
95	Bernard Labourdette (FRA)	8
96	Désiré Letort (FRA)	17
97	Leif Mortensen (DEN)	6
98	Luis Ocaña (ESP)	DNF
99	Johny Schleck (LUX)	22
100	Alain Vasseur (FRA)	65
Directeur sportif: Maurice De Muer

Scic
No.	Rider	Pos.
101	Luciano Armani (ITA)	66
102	Franco Balmamion (ITA)	DNF
103	Attilio Benfatto (ITA)	DNF
104	Davide Boifava (ITA)	DNF
105	Constantino Conti (ITA)	DNF
106	Claudio Michelotto (ITA)	DNF
107	Enrico Paolini (ITA)	DNF
108	Adriano Pella (ITA)	78
109	Celestino Vercelli (ITA)	83
110	Paolo Zini (ITA)	DNF
Directeur sportif: Eraldo Giganti

Goudsmit–Hoff
No.	Rider	Pos.
111	Henk Benjamins (NED)	80
112	Matthijs de Koning (NED)	76
113	Ger Harings (NED)	82
114	Gerben Karstens (NED)	63
115	Jan Krekels (NED)	50
116	Wim Prinsen (NED)	59
117	Cees Rentmeester (NED)	DNF
118	Harry Steevens (NED)	DNF
119	Jos van der Vleuten (NED)	30
120	Jan van Katwijk (NED)	87
Directeur sportif: Kees Pellenaars

Werner
No.	Rider	Pos.
121	Luis Balagué (ESP)	45
122	José Casas (ESP)	DNF
123	Ventura Díaz (ESP)	33
124	José Gómez Lucas (ESP)	DNF
125	José Grande (ESP)	DNF
126	José Manuel López Rodríguez (ESP)	52
127	Antonio Martos (ESP)	13
128	Luis Santamarina (ESP)	24
129	Agustín Tamames (ESP)	15
130	Francisco Julia (ESP)	67
Directeur sportif: José Antonio Momeñe

=== By nationality ===
Country	No. of riders	Finishers	Stage wins
Belgium	25	20	9 (Eric Leman ×3, Albert Van Vlierberghe, Eddy Merckx ×4, Herman Van Springel)
Denmark	1	1	
France	35	31	4 (Jean-Pierre Genet, Bernard Thévenet, Bernard Labourdette, Jean-Pierre Danguillaume)
West Germany	2	1	
Great Britain	1	1	
Italy	25	11	3 (Pietro Guerra, Mauro Simonetti, Luciano Armani)
Luxembourg	2	2	
Netherlands	14	10	3 (Gerben Karstens, Rini Wagtmans, Jan Krekels)
Portugal	1	1	
Spain	21	15	4 (Luis Ocaña ×2, José Manuel Fuente ×2)
Sweden	2	0	
Switzerland	1	1	
Total	130	94	24 (Note: The team time trial on the prologue stage, won by Molteni, is not counted in this total.)
