= 1971 Tour de France, Stage 10 to Stage 20 =

Cycling race stages

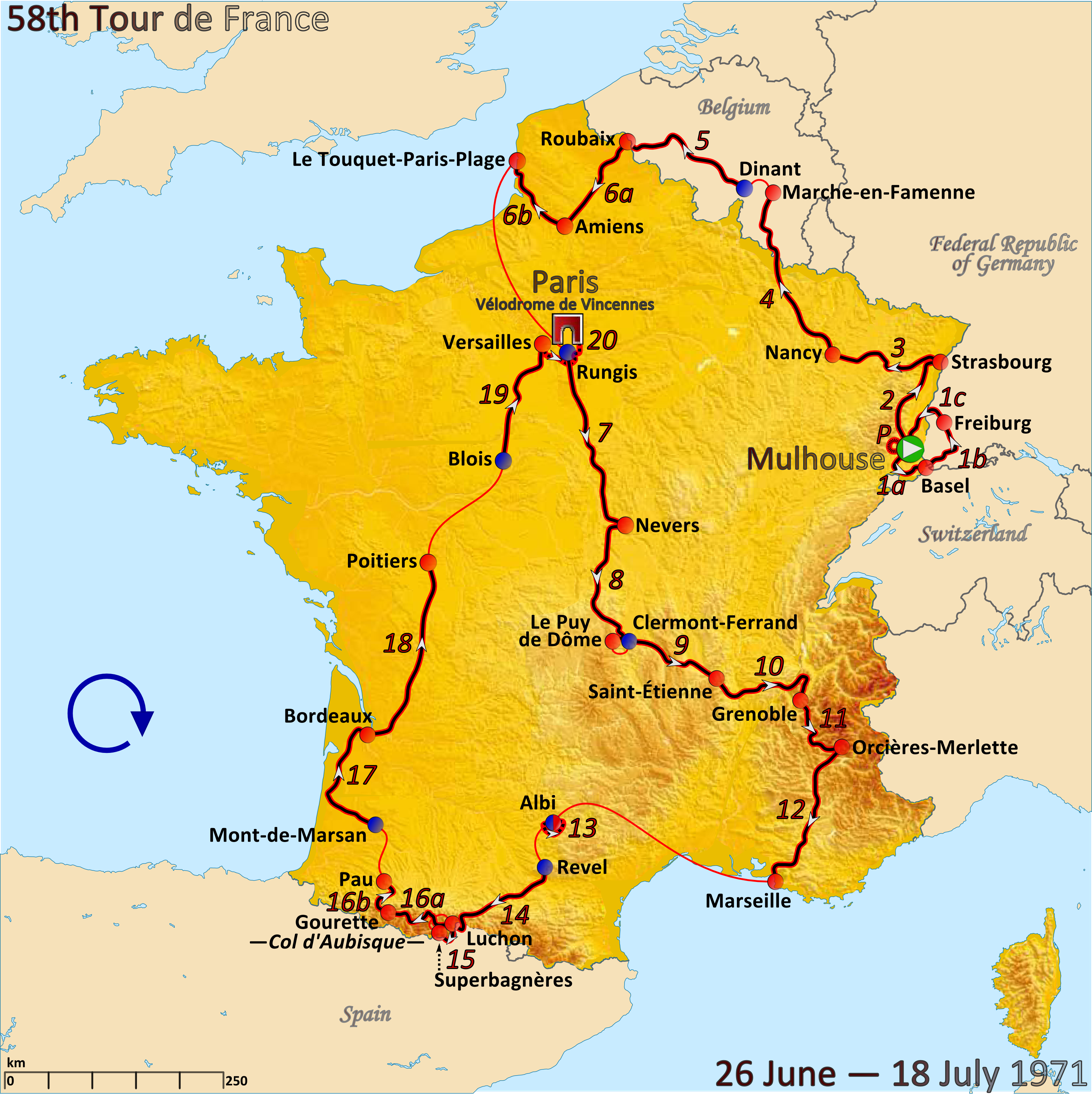
Route of the 1971 Tour de France

The 1971 Tour de France was the 58th edition of the Tour de France, one of cycling's Grand Tours. The Tour began in Mulhouse with a prologue team time trial on 26 June, and Stage 10 occurred on 7 July with a mountainous stage from Saint-Étienne. The race finished in Paris on 18 July.

== Stage 10 ==
7 July 1971 – Saint-Étienne to Grenoble, 188.5 km (117.1 mi)

Stage 10 result

Rank	Rider	Team	Time
1	Bernard Thévenet (FRA)	Peugeot–BP–Michelin	5h 24' 33"
2	Gösta Pettersson (SWE)	Ferretti	s.t.
3	Joop Zoetemelk (NED)	Flandria–Mars	s.t.
4	Luis Ocaña (ESP)	Bic	s.t.
5	Cyrille Guimard (FRA)	Fagor–Mercier–Hutchinson	+ 1' 09"
6	Lucien Van Impe (BEL)	Sonolor–Lejeune	s.t.
7	Eddy Merckx (BEL)	Molteni	+ 1' 36"
8	Luis Zubero (ESP)	Kas–Kaskol	s.t.
9	Jean-Pierre Danguillaume (FRA)	Peugeot–BP–Michelin	+ 1' 52"
10	Vicente López Carril (ESP)	Kas–Kaskol	s.t.

General classification after stage 10

Rank	Rider	Team	Time
1	Joop Zoetemelk (NED)	Mars–Flandria	54h 30' 15"
2	Luis Ocaña (ESP)	Bic	+ 1"
3	Gösta Pettersson (SWE)	Ferretti	+ 40"
4	Eddy Merckx (BEL)	Molteni	+ 1' 00"
5	Bernard Thévenet (FRA)	Peugeot	+ 1' 22"
6	Lucien Van Impe (BEL)	Sonolor–Lejeune	+ 3' 24"
7	Leif Mortensen (DEN)	Bic	+ 4' 28"
8	Gianni Motta (ITA)	Salvarani	+ 5' 13"
9	Enrico Paolini (ITA)	Scic	+ 5' 36"
10	Tomas Pettersson (SWE)	Ferretti	+ 6' 00"

== Stage 11 ==
8 July 1971 – Grenoble to Orcières-Merlette, 134 km (83 mi)

Stage 11 result

Rank	Rider	Team	Time
1	Luis Ocaña (ESP)	Bic	4h 02' 49"
2	Lucien Van Impe (BEL)	Sonolor–Lejeune	+ 5' 52"
3	Eddy Merckx (BEL)	Molteni	+ 8' 42"
4	Joop Zoetemelk (NED)	Flandria–Mars	s.t.
5	Gösta Pettersson (SWE)	Ferretti	s.t.
6	Bernard Thévenet (FRA)	Peugeot–BP–Michelin	s.t.
7	Bernard Labourdette (FRA)	Bic	s.t.
8	Cyrille Guimard (FRA)	Fagor–Mercier–Hutchinson	+ 8' 46"
9	Tomas Pettersson (SWE)	Ferretti	s.t.
10	Joaquim Agostinho (POR)	Hoover–de Gribaldy–Wolber	+ 8' 50"

General classification after stage 11

Rank	Rider	Team	Time
1	Luis Ocaña (ESP)	Bic	58h 33' 00"
2	Joop Zoetemelk (NED)	Mars–Flandria	+ 8' 43"
3	Lucien Van Impe (BEL)	Sonolor–Lejeune	+ 9' 20"
4	Gösta Pettersson (SWE)	Ferretti	+ 9' 26"
5	Eddy Merckx (BEL)	Molteni	+ 9' 46"
6	Bernard Thévenet (FRA)	Peugeot	+ 10' 08"
7	Leif Mortensen (DEN)	Bic	+ 13' 22"
8	Tomas Pettersson (SWE)	Ferretti	+ 14' 50"
9	Joaquim Agostinho (POR)	Hoover–de Gribaldy–Wolber	+ 20' 31"
10	Cyrille Guimard (FRA)	Fagor–Mercier	+ 21' 35"

== Rest day 2 ==
9 July 1971 – Orcières-Merlette

== Stage 12 ==
10 July 1971 – Orcières-Merlette to Marseille, 251 km (156 mi)

Stage 12 result

Rank	Rider	Team	Time
1	Luciano Armani (ITA)	Scic	5h 25' 28"
2	Eddy Merckx (BEL)	Molteni	s.t.
3	Lucien Aimar (FRA)	Sonolor–Lejeune	s.t.
4	Jos van der Vleuten (NED)	Goudsmit–Hoff	s.t.
5	Enrico Paolini (ITA)	Scic	s.t.
6	Désiré Letort (FRA)	Bic	s.t.
7	Robert Bouloux (FRA)	Peugeot–BP–Michelin	s.t.
8	Marinus Wagtmans (NED)	Molteni	+ 2"
9	Jos Huysmans (BEL)	Molteni	s.t.
10	Cyrille Guimard (FRA)	Fagor–Mercier–Hutchinson	+ 1' 56"

General classification after stage 12

Rank	Rider	Team	Time
1	Luis Ocaña (ESP)	Bic	64h 00' 24"
2	Eddy Merckx (BEL)	Molteni	+ 7' 34"
3	Joop Zoetemelk (NED)	Mars–Flandria	+ 8' 43"
4	Lucien Van Impe (BEL)	Sonolor–Lejeune	+ 9' 20"
5	Gösta Pettersson (SWE)	Ferretti	+ 9' 26"
6	Bernard Thévenet (FRA)	Peugeot	+ 10' 08"
7	Leif Mortensen (DEN)	Bic	+ 13' 22"
8	Tomas Pettersson (SWE)	Ferretti	+ 14' 50"
9	Joaquim Agostinho (POR)	Hoover–de Gribaldy–Wolber	+ 20' 31"
10	Cyrille Guimard (FRA)	Fagor–Mercier	+ 21' 35"

== Stage 13 ==
11 July 1971 – Albi to Albi, 16.3 km (10.1 mi) (ITT)

Stage 13 result

Rank	Rider	Team	Time
1	Eddy Merckx (BEL)	Molteni	22' 57"
2	Luis Ocaña (ESP)	Bic	+ 11"
3	Charly Grosskost (FRA)	Bic	s.t.
4	Cyrille Guimard (FRA)	Fagor–Mercier–Hutchinson	+ 26"
5	Ferdinand Bracke (BEL)	Peugeot–BP–Michelin	s.t.
6	Mauro Simonetti (ITA)	Ferretti	+ 41"
7	Tomas Pettersson (SWE)	Ferretti	+ 42"
8	Bernard Thévenet (FRA)	Peugeot–BP–Michelin	s.t.
9	Joaquim Agostinho (POR)	Hoover–de Gribaldy–Wolber	+ 50"
10	Désiré Letort (FRA)	Bic	+ 55"

General classification after stage 13

Rank	Rider	Team	Time
1	Luis Ocaña (ESP)	Bic	64h 23' 32"
2	Eddy Merckx (BEL)	Molteni	+ 7' 23"
3	Joop Zoetemelk (NED)	Mars–Flandria	+ 9' 34"
4	Lucien Van Impe (BEL)	Sonolor–Lejeune	+ 10' 14"
5	Gösta Pettersson (SWE)	Ferretti	+ 10' 30"
6	Bernard Thévenet (FRA)	Peugeot	+ 10' 39"
7	Leif Mortensen (DEN)	Bic	+ 14' 31"
8	Tomas Pettersson (SWE)	Ferretti	+ 15' 21"
9	Joaquim Agostinho (POR)	Hoover–de Gribaldy–Wolber	+ 21' 10"
10	Cyrille Guimard (FRA)	Fagor–Mercier	+ 21' 50"

== Stage 14 ==
12 July 1971 – Revel to Luchon, 214.5 km (133.3 mi)

Stage 14 result

Rank	Rider	Team	Time
1	José Manuel Fuente (ESP)	Kas–Kaskol	6h 11' 54"
2	Eddy Merckx (BEL)	Molteni	+ 6' 21"
3	Lucien Van Impe (BEL)	Sonolor–Lejeune	s.t.
4	Vicente López Carril (ESP)	Kas–Kaskol	s.t.
5	Lucien Aimar (FRA)	Sonolor–Lejeune	s.t.
6	Joop Zoetemelk (NED)	Flandria–Mars	s.t.
7	Cyrille Guimard (FRA)	Fagor–Mercier–Hutchinson	+ 7' 15"
8	Antonio Martos (ESP)	Werner	+ 7' 26"
9	Bernard Labourdette (FRA)	Bic	+ 7' 34"
10	Joaquim Agostinho (POR)	Hoover–de Gribaldy–Wolber	+ 7' 35"

General classification after stage 14

Rank	Rider	Team	Time
1	Eddy Merckx (BEL)	Molteni	70h 49' 10"
2	Joop Zoetemelk (NED)	Mars–Flandria	+ 2' 21"
3	Lucien Van Impe (BEL)	Sonolor–Lejeune	+ 2' 51"
4	Bernard Thévenet (FRA)	Peugeot	+ 4' 46"
5	Leif Mortensen (DEN)	Bic	+ 11' 24"
6	Tomas Pettersson (SWE)	Ferretti	+ 14' 56"
7	Joaquim Agostinho (POR)	Hoover–de Gribaldy–Wolber	+ 15' 01"
8	Cyrille Guimard (FRA)	Fagor–Mercier	+ 15' 21"
9	Lucien Aimar (FRA)	Sonolor–Lejeune	+ 19' 41"
10	Bernard Labourdette (FRA)	Bic	+ 20' 00"

== Stage 15 ==
13 July 1971 – Luchon to Superbagnères, 19.6 km (12.2 mi)

Stage 15 result

Rank	Rider	Team	Time
1	José Manuel Fuente (ESP)	Kas–Kaskol	47' 42"
2	Lucien Van Impe (BEL)	Sonolor–Lejeune	+ 26"
3	Bernard Thévenet (FRA)	Peugeot–BP–Michelin	+ 28"
4	Eddy Merckx (BEL)	Molteni	+ 1' 00"
5	Joop Zoetemelk (NED)	Flandria–Mars	s.t.
6	Francisco Galdós (ESP)	Kas–Kaskol	+ 1' 02"
7	Victor Van Schil (BEL)	Molteni	+ 1' 04"
8	Joaquim Agostinho (POR)	Hoover–de Gribaldy–Wolber	+ 1' 06"
9	Cyrille Guimard (FRA)	Fagor–Mercier–Hutchinson	+ 1' 09"
10	Raymond Delisle (FRA)	Peugeot–BP–Michelin	s.t.

General classification after stage 15

Rank	Rider	Team	Time
1	Eddy Merckx (BEL)	Molteni	71h 37' 52"
2	Lucien Van Impe (BEL)	Sonolor–Lejeune	+ 2' 17"
3	Joop Zoetemelk (NED)	Mars–Flandria	+ 2' 21"
4	Bernard Thévenet (FRA)	Peugeot	+ 4' 14"
5	Leif Mortensen (DEN)	Bic	+ 12' 16"
6	Joaquim Agostinho (POR)	Hoover–de Gribaldy–Wolber	+ 15' 07"
7	Cyrille Guimard (FRA)	Fagor–Mercier	+ 15' 30"
8	Tomas Pettersson (SWE)	Ferretti	+ 16' 42"
9	Lucien Aimar (FRA)	Sonolor–Lejeune	+ 21' 49"
10	Bernard Labourdette (FRA)	Bic	+ 22' 28"

== Stage 16a ==
14 July 1971 – Luchon to Gourette, 145 km (90 mi)

Stage 16a result

Rank	Rider	Team	Time
1	Bernard Labourdette (FRA)	Bic	5h 08' 36"
2	Eddy Merckx (BEL)	Molteni	+ 1' 32"
3	Lucien Van Impe (BEL)	Sonolor–Lejeune	+ 1' 34"
4	Joop Zoetemelk (NED)	Flandria–Mars	+ 1' 35"
5	Cyrille Guimard (FRA)	Fagor–Mercier–Hutchinson	+ 1' 39"
6	Vicente López Carril (ESP)	Kas–Kaskol	+ 1' 44"
7	Désiré Letort (FRA)	Bic	+ 1' 49"
8	Joaquim Agostinho (POR)	Hoover–de Gribaldy–Wolber	+ 1' 51"
9	Leif Mortensen (DEN)	Bic	+ 2' 20"
10	Marinus Wagtmans (NED)	Molteni	+ 2' 57"

General classification after stage 16a

Rank	Rider	Team	Time
1	Eddy Merckx (BEL)	Molteni	76h 47' 57"
2	Lucien Van Impe (BEL)	Sonolor–Lejeune	+ 2' 17"
3	Joop Zoetemelk (NED)	Mars–Flandria	+ 2' 26"
4	Bernard Thévenet (FRA)	Peugeot	+ 6' 36"
5	Leif Mortensen (DEN)	Bic	+ 13' 07"
6	Joaquim Agostinho (POR)	Hoover–de Gribaldy–Wolber	+ 15' 29"
7	Cyrille Guimard (FRA)	Fagor–Mercier	+ 15' 40"
8	Bernard Labourdette (FRA)	Bic	+ 20' 59"
9	Lucien Aimar (FRA)	Sonolor–Lejeune	+ 23' 41"
10	Vicente López Carril (ESP)	Kas	+ 24' 07"

== Stage 16b ==
14 July 1971 – Gourette to Pau, 57.5 km (35.7 mi)

Stage 16b result

Rank	Rider	Team	Time
1	Herman Van Springel (BEL)	Molteni	1h 17' 58"
2	Willy Van Neste (BEL)	Flandria–Mars	s.t.
3	Cyrille Guimard (FRA)	Fagor–Mercier–Hutchinson	+ 24"
4	Eddy Merckx (BEL)	Molteni	s.t.
5	Enrico Paolini (ITA)	Scic	s.t.
6	Joop Zoetemelk (NED)	Flandria–Mars	s.t.
7	Lucien Van Impe (BEL)	Sonolor–Lejeune	s.t.
8	Joaquim Agostinho (POR)	Hoover–de Gribaldy–Wolber	s.t.
9	Leif Mortensen (DEN)	Bic	s.t.
10	Agustín Tamames (ESP)	Werner	s.t.

General classification after stage 16b

Rank	Rider	Team	Time
1	Eddy Merckx (BEL)	Molteni	78h 06' 19"
2	Lucien Van Impe (BEL)	Sonolor–Lejeune	+ 2' 17"
3	Joop Zoetemelk (NED)	Mars–Flandria	+ 2' 21"
4	Bernard Thévenet (FRA)	Peugeot	+ 6' 49"
5	Leif Mortensen (DEN)	Bic	+ 13' 07"
6	Joaquim Agostinho (POR)	Hoover–de Gribaldy–Wolber	+ 15' 29"
7	Cyrille Guimard (FRA)	Fagor–Mercier	+ 15' 34"
8	Bernard Labourdette (FRA)	Bic	+ 21' 12"
9	Lucien Aimar (FRA)	Sonolor–Lejeune	+ 23' 54"
10	Vicente López Carril (ESP)	Kas	+ 24' 20"

== Stage 17 ==
15 July 1971 – Mont-de-Marsan to Bordeaux, 188 km (117 mi)

Stage 17 result

Rank	Rider	Team	Time
1	Eddy Merckx (BEL)	Molteni	5h 32' 31"
2	Georges Vandenberghe (BEL)	Salvarani	s.t.
3	Roger Swerts (BEL)	Molteni	s.t.
4	Jos van der Vleuten (NED)	Goudsmit–Hoff	s.t.
5	Raymond Riotte (FRA)	Sonolor–Lejeune	s.t.
6	Barry Hoban (GBR)	Sonolor–Lejeune	+ 2' 26"
7	José Manuel López (ESP)	Sonolor–Lejeune	s.t.
8	Nemesio Jiménez (ESP)	Kas–Kaskol	s.t.
9	Julien Stevens (BEL)	Molteni	+ 3' 01"
10	Gerben Karstens (NED)	Goudsmit–Hoff	+ 3' 05"

General classification after stage 17

Rank	Rider	Team	Time
1	Eddy Merckx (BEL)	Molteni	83h 38' 30"
2	Lucien Van Impe (BEL)	Sonolor–Lejeune	+ 5' 38"
3	Joop Zoetemelk (NED)	Mars–Flandria	+ 5' 46"
4	Bernard Thévenet (FRA)	Peugeot	+ 10' 14"
5	Leif Mortensen (DEN)	Bic	+ 16' 32"
6	Joaquim Agostinho (POR)	Hoover–de Gribaldy–Wolber	+ 18' 54"
7	Cyrille Guimard (FRA)	Fagor–Mercier	+ 19' 29"
8	Bernard Labourdette (FRA)	Bic	+ 24' 37"
9	Lucien Aimar (FRA)	Sonolor–Lejeune	+ 27' 19"
10	Vicente López Carril (ESP)	Kas	+ 27' 45"

== Stage 18 ==
16 July 1971 – Bordeaux to Poitiers, 244 km (152 mi)

Stage 18 result

Rank	Rider	Team	Time
1	Jean-Pierre Danguillaume (FRA)	Peugeot–BP–Michelin	6h 30' 33"
2	Jan Krekels (NED)	Goudsmit–Hoff	s.t.
3	Bernard Guyot (FRA)	Sonolor–Lejeune	s.t.
4	Ottavio Crepaldi (ITA)	Salvarani	s.t.
5	José Catieau (FRA)	Sonolor–Lejeune	s.t.
6	Jozef Spruyt (BEL)	Molteni	s.t.
7	Jean Vidament (FRA)	Hoover–de Gribaldy–Wolber	s.t.
8	Enrico Paolini (ITA)	Scic	s.t.
9	Rolf Wolfshohl (FRG)	Fagor–Mercier–Hutchinson	s.t.
10	Johny Schleck (LUX)	Bic	s.t.

General classification after stage 18

Rank	Rider	Team	Time
1	Eddy Merckx (BEL)	Molteni	90h 13' 06"
2	Lucien Van Impe (BEL)	Sonolor–Lejeune	+ 5' 38"
3	Joop Zoetemelk (NED)	Mars–Flandria	+ 5' 45"
4	Bernard Thévenet (FRA)	Peugeot	+ 10' 14"
5	Leif Mortensen (DEN)	Bic	+ 16' 32"
6	Joaquim Agostinho (POR)	Hoover–de Gribaldy–Wolber	+ 18' 54"
7	Cyrille Guimard (FRA)	Fagor–Mercier	+ 19' 29"
8	Bernard Labourdette (FRA)	Bic	+ 24' 30"
9	Lucien Aimar (FRA)	Sonolor–Lejeune	+ 26' 22"
10	Vicente López Carril (ESP)	Kas	+ 28' 13"

== Stage 19 ==
17 July 1971 – Blois to Versailles, 185 km (115 mi)

Stage 19 result

Rank	Rider	Team	Time
1	Jan Krekels (NED)	Goudsmit–Hoff	5h 21' 06"
2	Cyrille Guimard (FRA)	Fagor–Mercier–Hutchinson	s.t.
3	Jean-Pierre Danguillaume (FRA)	Peugeot–BP–Michelin	s.t.
4	Wilmo Francioni (ITA)	Ferretti	s.t.
5	Marinus Wagtmans (NED)	Molteni	s.t.
6	Herman Van Springel (BEL)	Molteni	s.t.
7	Luciano Armani (ITA)	Scic	s.t.
8	Julien Stevens (BEL)	Molteni	(5h 21' 04")
9	Victor Van Schil (BEL)	Molteni	5h 21' 06"
10	Joaquim Agostinho (POR)	Hoover–de Gribaldy–Wolber	s.t.

General classification after stage 19

Rank	Rider	Team	Time
1	Eddy Merckx (BEL)	Molteni	95h 34' 42"
2	Lucien Van Impe (BEL)	Sonolor–Lejeune	+ 5' 38"
3	Joop Zoetemelk (NED)	Mars–Flandria	+ 5' 45"
4	Bernard Thévenet (FRA)	Peugeot	+ 10' 14"
5	Leif Mortensen (DEN)	Bic	+ 16' 32"
6	Joaquim Agostinho (POR)	Hoover–de Gribaldy–Wolber	+ 18' 24"
7	Cyrille Guimard (FRA)	Fagor–Mercier	+ 18' 49"
8	Bernard Labourdette (FRA)	Bic	+ 24' 30"
9	Lucien Aimar (FRA)	Sonolor–Lejeune	+ 26' 22"
10	Vicente López Carril (ESP)	Kas	+ 28' 13"

== Stage 20 ==
18 July 1971 – Versailles to Paris, 53.8 km (33.4 mi) (ITT)

Stage 20 result

Rank	Rider	Team	Time
1	Eddy Merckx (BEL)	Molteni	1h 10' 32"
2	Joaquim Agostinho (POR)	Hoover–de Gribaldy–Wolber	+ 2' 36"
3	Marinus Wagtmans (NED)	Molteni	+ 2' 52"
4	Ferdinand Bracke (BEL)	Peugeot	+ 3' 04"
5	Roger Swerts (BEL)	Molteni	+ 3' 15"
6	Herman Van Springel (BEL)	Molteni	+ 3' 26"
7	Victor Van Schil (BEL)	Molteni	+ 4' 03"
8	Joop Zoetemelk (NED)	Mars–Flandria	+ 4' 06"
9	Cyrille Guimard (FRA)	Fagor–Mercier	+ 4' 09"
10	Nemesio Jiménez (ESP)	Kas	+ 4' 12"

General classification after stage 20

Rank	Rider	Team	Time
1	Eddy Merckx (BEL)	Molteni	96h 45' 14"
2	Joop Zoetemelk (NED)	Mars–Flandria	+ 9' 51"
3	Lucien Van Impe (BEL)	Sonolor–Lejeune	+ 11' 06"
4	Bernard Thévenet (FRA)	Peugeot	+ 14' 50"
5	Joaquim Agostinho (POR)	Hoover–de Gribaldy–Wolber	+ 21' 00"
6	Leif Mortensen (DEN)	Bic	+ 21' 38"
7	Cyrille Guimard (FRA)	Fagor–Mercier	+ 22' 58"
8	Bernard Labourdette (FRA)	Bic	+ 30' 07"
9	Lucien Aimar (FRA)	Sonolor–Lejeune	+ 32' 45"
10	Vicente López Carril (ESP)	Kas	+ 36' 00"
