= François Coquery =

French cyclist

Personal information
- Born: 22 September 1948 (age 78)

Cycling career
- Sport: Cycling
- Role: Rider

François Coquery (born 22 September 1948) is a French racing cyclist. He rode in the 1971 Tour de France.
