= Francisco Javier Galdeano =

Spanish cyclist

Personal information
- Born: 7 December 1949 (age 76)

Cycling career
- Sport: Cycling
- Role: Rider

Francisco Javier Galdeano (born 7 December 1949) is a Spanish racing cyclist. He rode in the 1971 Tour de France.
