= Henk Benjamins =

Dutch cyclist

Personal information
- Born: 16 September 1945 (age 81) Hollandscheveld

Cycling career
- Sport: Cycling
- Role: Rider

Henk Benjamins (born 16 September 1945) is a Dutch racing cyclist. He rode in the 1970 and the 1971 Tour de France.
