= Yves Ravaleu =

French cyclist

Personal information
- Born: 25 September 1945
- Died: 15 October 2003 (aged 58)

Cycling career
- Sport: Cycling
- Role: Rider

Yves Ravaleu (25 September 1945 – 15 October 2003) was a French racing cyclist. He rode in the 1969 Tour de France.
