= Pierre Martelozzo =

French cyclist

Personal information
- Born: 10 February 1947 (age 79)

Cycling career
- Sport: Cycling
- Role: Rider

Pierre Martelozzo (born 10 February 1947) is a French racing cyclist. He rode in the 1970 Tour de France.
