= Luciano Armani =

Italian cyclist (1940–2023)

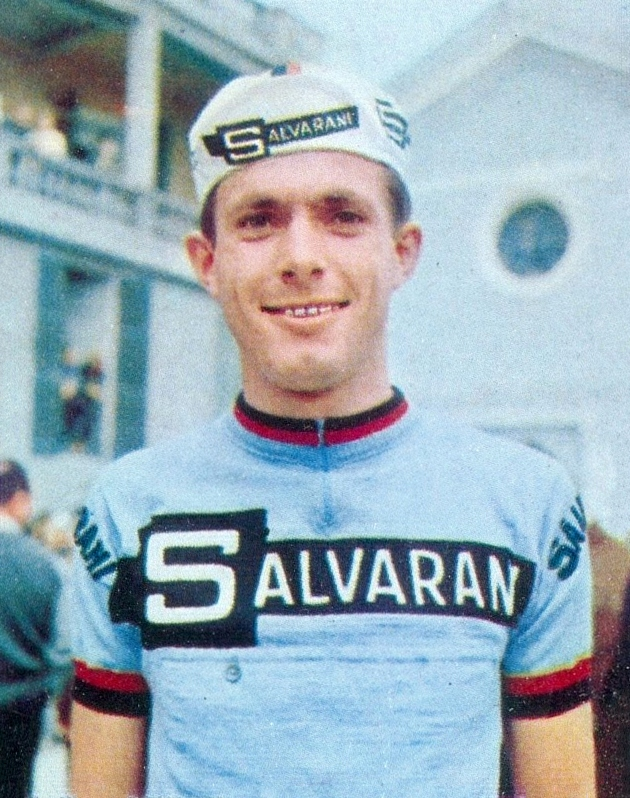
- Armani in 1966

Personal information
- Full name: Luciano Armani
- Born: 12 October 1940 Felegara, Medesano, Italy
- Died: 4 February 2023 (aged 82) Fidenza, Italy

Cycling career
- Sport: Cycling
- Discipline: Road
- Role: Rider

Luciano Armani (12 October 1940 – 4 February 2023) was an Italian professional road bicycle racer.

In the 1971 Tour de France, Luis Ocaña was leading the race after his great victory in the 11th stage, Eddy Merckx was more than 10 minutes behind. After the rest day, Merckx attacked in the 12th stage from the start, following his teammate Rini Wagtmans. Armani and some other cyclists joined them, and the group stayed away.

In the peloton, the teams of Luis Ocaña and Cyrille Guimard (the holder of the green jersey) were trying to get the group back. The entire stage (245 km) the difference stayed between 40 seconds and two minutes. At the end of the stage, Armani surprised Merckx, and the difference was 1 minute and 50 seconds.

Because of the high speed of the stage (45,351 km/h), the finish was reached 90 minutes faster than the fastest time schedule of the organizers, which caused a chaos. The latest group of cyclists had to fight to finish the race in the allowed time limit, even though they did the 245 km in more than 42 km/h.

== Major results ==
1965
Coppa Sabatini
Giro d'Italia:

Winner stage 7

1967
Giro di Sardegna
GP Monaco
Coppa Placci
1968
Tre Province
1969
Castiglione del Lago
Lisboa – Porto
1970
Genoa–Nice
Giro d'Italia:

Winner stage 21

Milano–Torino
1971
Tour de France:

Winner stage 12
