= 1970 Tour de France, Stage 11a to Stage 23 =

Cycling race stages

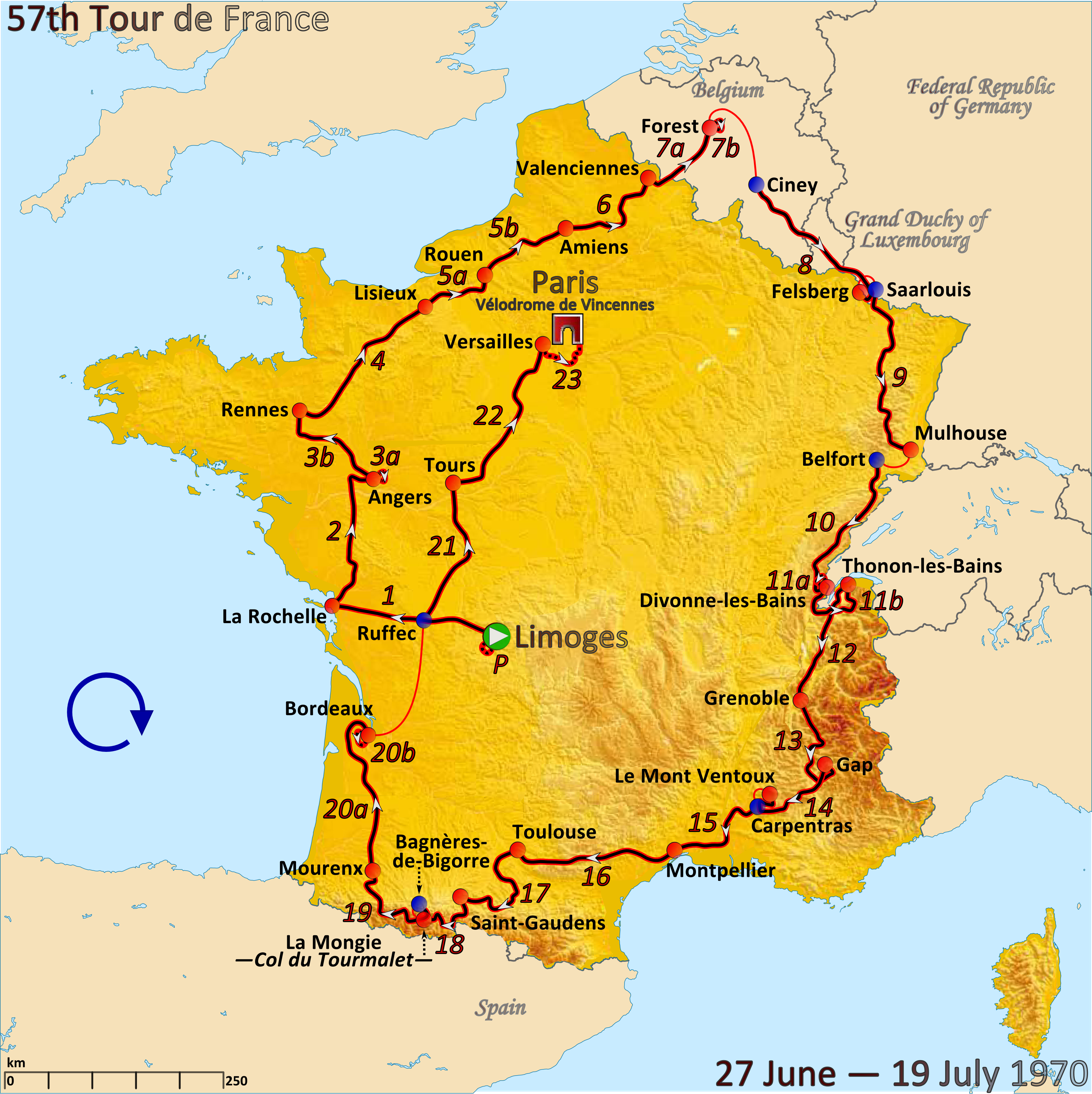
Route of the 1970 Tour de France

The 1970 Tour de France was the 57th edition of Tour de France, one of cycling's Grand Tours. The Tour began in Limoges with a prologue individual time trial on 27 June and Stage 11a occurred on 7 July with an individual time trial at Divonne-les-Bains. The race finished in Paris on 19 July.

== Stage 11a ==
7 July 1970 - Divonne-les-Bains, 8.8 km (5.5 mi) (ITT)

Stage 11a result

| Rank | Rider | Team | Time |
|---|---|---|---|
| 1 | Eddy Merckx (BEL) | Faemino–Faema | 10' 35" |
| 2 | José Antonio González (ESP) | Kas–Kaskol | + 9" |
| 3 | Charly Grosskost (FRA) | Bic | s.t. |
| 4 | Joop Zoetemelk (NED) | Flandria–Mars | s.t. |
| 5 | Mogens Frey (DEN) | Frimatic–de Gribaldy | + 13" |
| 6 | Gösta Pettersson (SWE) | Ferretti | s.t. |
| 7 | Luis Ocaña (ESP) | Bic | + 20" |
| 8 | Tomas Pettersson (SWE) | Ferretti | s.t. |
| 9 | Raymond Poulidor (FRA) | Fagor–Mercier–Hutchinson | + 25" |
| 10 | Herman Van Springel (BEL) | Dr. Mann–Grundig | + 26" |

General classification after stage 11a

| Rank | Rider | Team | Time |
|---|---|---|---|
| 1 | Eddy Merckx (BEL) | Faemino–Faema | 50h 06' 33" |
| 2 | Joop Zoetemelk (NED) | Flandria–Mars | + 3' 00" |
| 3 | Georges Pintens (BEL) | Dr. Mann–Grundig | + 4' 24" |
| 4 | Gösta Pettersson (SWE) | Ferretti | + 7' 57" |
| 5 | Herman Van Springel (BEL) | Dr. Mann–Grundig | + 8' 28" |
| 6 | Raymond Poulidor (FRA) | Fagor–Mercier–Hutchinson | + 8' 56" |
| 7 | Italo Zilioli (ITA) | Faemino–Faema | + 9' 14" |
| 8 | Francisco Galdós (ESP) | Kas–Kaskol | + 10' 13" |
| 9 | Marinus Wagtmans (NED) | Willem II–Gazelle | + 10' 14" |
| 10 | Walter Godefroot (BEL) | Salvarani | + 10' 19" |

== Stage 11b ==
7 July 1970 - Divonne-les-Bains to Thonon-les-Bains, 139.5 km (86.7 mi)

Stage 11b result

| Rank | Rider | Team | Time |
|---|---|---|---|
| 1 | Marino Basso (ITA) | Faemino–Faema | 3h 42' 43" |
| 2 | Jan Janssen (NED) | Bic | s.t. |
| 3 | Walter Godefroot (BEL) | Salvarani | s.t. |
| 4 | Cyrille Guimard (FRA) | Fagor–Mercier–Hutchinson | s.t. |
| 5 | Daniel Van Ryckeghem (BEL) | Dr. Mann–Grundig | s.t. |
| 6 | Marinus Wagtmans (NED) | Willem II–Gazelle | s.t. |
| 7 | Willy Van Neste (BEL) | Dr. Mann–Grundig | s.t. |
| 8 | Albert Van Vlierberghe (BEL) | Ferretti | s.t. |
| 9 | Evert Dolman (NED) | Willem II–Gazelle | s.t. |
| 10 | Christian Raymond (FRA) | Peugeot–BP–Michelin | s.t. |

General classification after stage 11b

| Rank | Rider | Team | Time |
|---|---|---|---|
| 1 | Eddy Merckx (BEL) | Faemino–Faema | 53h 49' 16" |
| 2 | Joop Zoetemelk (NED) | Flandria–Mars | + 3' 00" |
| 3 | Georges Pintens (BEL) | Dr. Mann–Grundig | + 4' 24" |
| 4 | Gösta Pettersson (SWE) | Ferretti | + 7' 57" |
| 5 | Herman Van Springel (BEL) | Dr. Mann–Grundig | + 8' 28" |
| 6 | Raymond Poulidor (FRA) | Fagor–Mercier–Hutchinson | + 8' 56" |
| 7 | Italo Zilioli (ITA) | Faemino–Faema | + 9' 14" |
| 8 | Marinus Wagtmans (NED) | Willem II–Gazelle | + 10' 14" |
| 9 | Walter Godefroot (BEL) | Salvarani | + 10' 19" |
| 10 | Martin Van Den Bossche (BEL) | Molteni | s.t. |

== Stage 12 ==
8 July 1970 - Thonon-les-Bains to Grenoble, 194 km (120.5 mi)

Stage 12 result

| Rank | Rider | Team | Time |
|---|---|---|---|
| 1 | Eddy Merckx (BEL) | Faemino–Faema | 6h 01' 49" |
| 2 | Luis Zubero (ESP) | Kas–Kaskol | + 1' 35" |
| 3 | Silvano Schiavon (BEL) | Salvarani | + 2' 07" |
| 4 | Tony Houbrechts (FRA) | Salvarani | s.t. |
| 5 | Gösta Pettersson (SWE) | Ferretti | s.t. |
| 6 | Marinus Wagtmans (NED) | Willem II–Gazelle | s.t. |
| 7 | Andrés Gandarias (ESP) | Kas–Kaskol | + 2' 36" |
| 8 | Francisco Galdós (ESP) | Kas–Kaskol | + 2' 45" |
| 9 | Herman Van Springel (BEL) | Dr. Mann–Grundig | + 3' 01" |
| 10 | Jan Janssen (NED) | Bic | s.t. |

General classification after stage 12

| Rank | Rider | Team | Time |
|---|---|---|---|
| 1 | Eddy Merckx (BEL) | Faemino–Faema | 59h 51' 05" |
| 2 | Joop Zoetemelk (NED) | Flandria–Mars | + 6' 01" |
| 3 | Gösta Pettersson (SWE) | Ferretti | + 10' 04" |
| 4 | Herman Van Springel (BEL) | Dr. Mann–Grundig | + 11' 29" |
| 5 | Raymond Poulidor (FRA) | Fagor–Mercier–Hutchinson | + 11' 57" |
| 6 | Italo Zilioli (ITA) | Faemino–Faema | + 12' 15" |
| 7 | Marinus Wagtmans (NED) | Willem II–Gazelle | + 12' 21" |
| 8 | Francisco Galdós (ESP) | Kas–Kaskol | + 12' 58" |
| 9 | Georges Pintens (BEL) | Dr. Mann–Grundig | + 13' 05" |
| 10 | Martin Van Den Bossche (BEL) | Molteni | + 13' 20" |

== Stage 13 ==
9 July 1970 - Grenoble to Gap, 195.5 km (121.5 mi)

Stage 13 result

| Rank | Rider | Team | Time |
|---|---|---|---|
| 1 | Primo Mori (ITA) | Salvarani | 5h 52' 16" |
| 2 | Marinus Wagtmans (NED) | Willem II–Gazelle | + 1' 17" |
| 3 | Walter Godefroot (BEL) | Salvarani | + 2' 30" |
| 4 | Eddy Merckx (BEL) | Faemino–Faema | s.t. |
| 5 | Luis Zubero (ESP) | Kas–Kaskol | s.t. |
| 6 | Lucien Van Impe (BEL) | Sonolor–Lejeune | s.t. |
| 7 | Alain Vasseur (FRA) | Bic | + 3' 08" |
| 8 | Pierre Gautier (FRA) | Frimatic–de Gribaldy | s.t. |
| 9 | Lucien Aimar (FRA) | Sonolor–Lejeune | s.t. |
| 10 | Franco Mori (ITA) | Molteni | s.t. |

General classification after stage 13

| Rank | Rider | Team | Time |
|---|---|---|---|
| 1 | Eddy Merckx (BEL) | Faemino–Faema | 65h 45' 51" |
| 2 | Joop Zoetemelk (NED) | Flandria–Mars | + 6' 39" |
| 3 | Gösta Pettersson (SWE) | Ferretti | + 10' 42" |
| 4 | Marinus Wagtmans (NED) | Willem II–Gazelle | + 11' 08" |
| 5 | Herman Van Springel (BEL) | Dr. Mann–Grundig | + 12' 07" |
| 6 | Raymond Poulidor (FRA) | Fagor–Mercier–Hutchinson | + 12' 35" |
| 7 | Italo Zilioli (ITA) | Faemino–Faema | + 12' 53" |
| 8 | Francisco Galdós (ESP) | Kas–Kaskol | + 13' 36" |
| 9 | Georges Pintens (BEL) | Dr. Mann–Grundig | + 13' 55" |
| 10 | Martin Van Den Bossche (BEL) | Molteni | + 13' 58" |

== Stage 14 ==
10 July 1970 - Gap to Mont Ventoux, 170 km (110 mi)

Stage 14 result

| Rank | Rider | Team | Time |
|---|---|---|---|
| 1 | Eddy Merckx (BEL) | Faemino–Faema | 5h 47' 44" |
| 2 | Martin Van Den Bossche (BEL) | Molteni | + 1' 11" |
| 3 | Lucien Van Impe (BEL) | Sonolor–Lejeune | s.t. |
| 4 | Marinus Wagtmans (NED) | Willem II–Gazelle | + 1' 21" |
| 5 | Bernard Thévenet (FRA) | Peugeot–BP–Michelin | + 1' 25" |
| 6 | Raymond Delisle (FRA) | Peugeot–BP–Michelin | + 1' 31" |
| 7 | Tony Houbrechts (FRA) | Salvarani | s.t. |
| 8 | Raymond Poulidor (FRA) | Fagor–Mercier–Hutchinson | s.t. |
| 9 | Gösta Pettersson (SWE) | Ferretti | + 1' 39" |
| 10 | Francisco Galdós (ESP) | Kas–Kaskol | s.t. |

General classification after stage 14

| Rank | Rider | Team | Time |
|---|---|---|---|
| 1 | Eddy Merckx (BEL) | Faemino–Faema | 71h 33' 35" |
| 2 | Joop Zoetemelk (NED) | Flandria–Mars | + 9' 26" |
| 3 | Gösta Pettersson (SWE) | Ferretti | + 12' 21" |
| 4 | Marinus Wagtmans (NED) | Willem II–Gazelle | + 12' 29" |
| 5 | Raymond Poulidor (FRA) | Fagor–Mercier–Hutchinson | + 14' 06" |
| 6 | Martin Van Den Bossche (BEL) | Molteni | + 15' 09" |
| 7 | Lucien Van Impe (BEL) | Sonolor–Lejeune | + 15' 12" |
| 8 | Francisco Galdós (ESP) | Kas–Kaskol | + 15' 15" |
| 9 | Georges Pintens (BEL) | Dr. Mann–Grundig | + 16' 15" |
| 10 | Tony Houbrechts (FRA) | Salvarani | + 17' 33" |

== Stage 15 ==
11 July 1970 - Carpentras to Montpellier, 144.5 km (89.8 mi)

Stage 15 result

| Rank | Rider | Team | Time |
|---|---|---|---|
| 1 | Marinus Wagtmans (NED) | Willem II–Gazelle | 3h 53' 58" |
| 2 | Marino Basso (ITA) | Faemino–Faema | + 10" |
| 3 | Pieter Nassen (BEL) | Flandria–Mars | + 15" |
| 4 | Evert Dolman (NED) | Willem II–Gazelle | s.t. |
| 5 | Cyrille Guimard (FRA) | Fagor–Mercier–Hutchinson | s.t. |
| 6 | Rolf Wolfshohl (FRG) | Fagor–Mercier–Hutchinson | s.t. |
| 7 | Georges Vandenberghe (BEL) | Faemino–Faema | s.t. |
| 8 | Cees Zoontjens (NED) | Caballero–Laurens | s.t. |
| 9 | Attilio Benfatto (ITA) | Scic | s.t. |
| 10 | Harry Steevens (NED) | Caballero–Laurens | s.t. |

General classification after stage 15

| Rank | Rider | Team | Time |
|---|---|---|---|
| 1 | Eddy Merckx (BEL) | Faemino–Faema | 75h 27' 33" |
| 2 | Joop Zoetemelk (NED) | Flandria–Mars | + 9' 26" |
| 3 | Marinus Wagtmans (NED) | Willem II–Gazelle | + 12' 09" |
| 4 | Gösta Pettersson (SWE) | Ferretti | + 12' 21" |
| 5 | Raymond Poulidor (FRA) | Fagor–Mercier–Hutchinson | + 14' 06" |
| 6 | Martin Van Den Bossche (BEL) | Molteni | + 15' 09" |
| 7 | Lucien Van Impe (BEL) | Sonolor–Lejeune | + 15' 12" |
| 8 | Francisco Galdós (ESP) | Kas–Kaskol | + 15' 15" |
| 9 | Georges Pintens (BEL) | Dr. Mann–Grundig | + 16' 15" |
| 10 | Tony Houbrechts (FRA) | Salvarani | + 17' 33" |

== Stage 16 ==
12 July 1970 - Montpellier to Toulouse, 259.5 km (161.2 mi)

Stage 16 result

| Rank | Rider | Team | Time |
|---|---|---|---|
| 1 | Albert Van Vlierberghe (BEL) | Ferretti | 8h 21' 12" |
| 2 | Attilio Benfatto (ITA) | Scic | s.t. |
| 3 | Mogens Frey (DEN) | Frimatic–de Gribaldy | + 44" |
| 4 | Raymond Riotte (FRA) | Sonolor–Lejeune | s.t. |
| 5 | Pietro Guerra (ITA) | Salvarani | s.t. |
| 6 | Jos Huysmans (BEL) | Faemino–Faema | s.t. |
| 7 | Harm Ottenbros (NED) | Willem II–Gazelle | s.t. |
| 8 | Joseph Bruyère (BEL) | Faemino–Faema | s.t. |
| 9 | Jos van der Vleuten (NED) | Willem II–Gazelle | s.t. |
| 10 | Aurelio González Puente (ESP) | Kas–Kaskol | s.t. |

General classification after stage 16

| Rank | Rider | Team | Time |
|---|---|---|---|
| 1 | Eddy Merckx (BEL) | Faemino–Faema | 83h 49' 48" |
| 2 | Joop Zoetemelk (NED) | Flandria–Mars | + 9' 26" |
| 3 | Marinus Wagtmans (NED) | Willem II–Gazelle | + 12' 09" |
| 4 | Gösta Pettersson (SWE) | Ferretti | + 12' 21" |
| 5 | Raymond Poulidor (FRA) | Fagor–Mercier–Hutchinson | + 14' 06" |
| 6 | Martin Van Den Bossche (BEL) | Molteni | + 15' 09" |
| 7 | Lucien Van Impe (BEL) | Sonolor–Lejeune | + 15' 12" |
| 8 | Francisco Galdós (ESP) | Kas–Kaskol | + 15' 15" |
| 9 | Georges Pintens (BEL) | Dr. Mann–Grundig | + 16' 15" |
| 10 | Tony Houbrechts (FRA) | Salvarani | + 17' 33" |

== Stage 17 ==
13 July 1970 - Toulouse to Saint-Gaudens, 190 km (120 mi)

Stage 17 result

| Rank | Rider | Team | Time |
|---|---|---|---|
| 1 | Luis Ocaña (ESP) | Bic | 5h 20' 47" |
| 2 | Cyrille Guimard (FRA) | Fagor–Mercier–Hutchinson | + 2' 22" |
| 3 | Marino Basso (ITA) | Faemino–Faema | s.t. |
| 4 | Walter Godefroot (BEL) | Salvarani | s.t. |
| 5 | Harry Steevens (NED) | Caballero–Laurens | s.t. |
| 6 | Daniel Van Ryckeghem (BEL) | Dr. Mann–Grundig | s.t. |
| 7 | Gerard Vianen (NED) | Caballero–Laurens | s.t. |
| 8 | Evert Dolman (NED) | Willem II–Gazelle | s.t. |
| 9 | Marinus Wagtmans (NED) | Willem II–Gazelle | s.t. |
| 10 | Albert Van Vlierberghe (BEL) | Ferretti | s.t. |

General classification after stage 17

| Rank | Rider | Team | Time |
|---|---|---|---|
| 1 | Eddy Merckx (BEL) | Faemino–Faema | 89h 12' 57" |
| 2 | Joop Zoetemelk (NED) | Flandria–Mars | + 9' 26" |
| 3 | Marinus Wagtmans (NED) | Willem II–Gazelle | + 12' 09" |
| 4 | Gösta Pettersson (SWE) | Ferretti | + 12' 21" |
| 5 | Raymond Poulidor (FRA) | Fagor–Mercier–Hutchinson | + 14' 06" |
| 6 | Martin Van Den Bossche (BEL) | Molteni | + 15' 09" |
| 7 | Lucien Van Impe (BEL) | Sonolor–Lejeune | + 15' 12" |
| 8 | Francisco Galdós (ESP) | Kas–Kaskol | + 15' 15" |
| 9 | Georges Pintens (BEL) | Dr. Mann–Grundig | + 16' 15" |
| 10 | Tony Houbrechts (FRA) | Salvarani | + 17' 33" |

== Stage 18 ==
14 July 1970 - Saint-Gaudens to La Mongie, 135.5 km (84.2 mi)

Stage 18 result

| Rank | Rider | Team | Time |
|---|---|---|---|
| 1 | Bernard Thévenet (FRA) | Peugeot–BP–Michelin | 4h 49' 36" |
| 2 | Martin Van Den Bossche (BEL) | Molteni | + 49" |
| 3 | Lucien Van Impe (BEL) | Sonolor–Lejeune | + 55" |
| 4 | Eddy Merckx (BEL) | Faemino–Faema | + 1' 06" |
| 5 | Tony Houbrechts (FRA) | Salvarani | + 1' 35" |
| 6 | Joop Zoetemelk (NED) | Flandria–Mars | +1' 37" |
| 7 | Silvano Schiavon (BEL) | Salvarani | + 1' 49" |
| 8 | Francisco Galdós (ESP) | Kas–Kaskol | + 1' 52" |
| 9 | Aurelio González Puente (ESP) | Kas–Kaskol | + 2' 02" |
| 10 | Gösta Pettersson (SWE) | Ferretti | + 2' 06" |

General classification after stage 18

| Rank | Rider | Team | Time |
|---|---|---|---|
| 1 | Eddy Merckx (BEL) | Faemino–Faema | 94h 03' 39" |
| 2 | Joop Zoetemelk (NED) | Flandria–Mars | + 9' 57" |
| 3 | Gösta Pettersson (SWE) | Ferretti | + 13' 21" |
| 4 | Marinus Wagtmans (NED) | Willem II–Gazelle | + 14' 02" |
| 5 | Martin Van Den Bossche (BEL) | Molteni | + 14' 52" |
| 6 | Lucien Van Impe (BEL) | Sonolor–Lejeune | + 15' 01" |
| 7 | Francisco Galdós (ESP) | Kas–Kaskol | + 16' 19" |
| 8 | Raymond Poulidor (FRA) | Fagor–Mercier–Hutchinson | + 16' 57" |
| 9 | Tony Houbrechts (FRA) | Salvarani | + 18' 02" |
| 10 | Georges Pintens (BEL) | Dr. Mann–Grundig | + 18' 33" |

== Stage 19 ==
15 July 1970 - Bagnères-de-Bigorre to Mourenx, 185.5 km (115.3 mi)

Stage 19 result

| Rank | Rider | Team | Time |
|---|---|---|---|
| 1 | Christian Raymond (FRA) | Peugeot–BP–Michelin | 5h 27' 25" |
| 2 | Walter Godefroot (BEL) | Salvarani | + 1' 01" |
| 3 | Jos Huysmans (BEL) | Faemino–Faema | s.t. |
| 4 | Aurelio González Puente (ESP) | Kas–Kaskol | s.t. |
| 5 | Robert Bouloux (FRA) | Peugeot–BP–Michelin | s.t. |
| 6 | André Poppe (BEL) | Dr. Mann–Grundig | s.t. |
| 7 | Harry Steevens (NED) | Caballero–Laurens | + 2' 27" |
| 8 | Ronald De Witte (BEL) | Dr. Mann–Grundig | s.t. |
| 9 | Gerard Vianen (NED) | Caballero–Laurens | s.t. |
| 10 | Jean-Pierre Danguillaume (FRA) | Peugeot–BP–Michelin | s.t. |

General classification after stage 19

| Rank | Rider | Team | Time |
|---|---|---|---|
| 1 | Eddy Merckx (BEL) | Faemino–Faema | 99h 33' 31" |
| 2 | Joop Zoetemelk (NED) | Flandria–Mars | + 9' 57" |
| 3 | Gösta Pettersson (SWE) | Ferretti | + 13' 21" |
| 4 | Marinus Wagtmans (NED) | Willem II–Gazelle | + 14' 02" |
| 5 | Martin Van Den Bossche (BEL) | Molteni | + 14' 52" |
| 6 | Lucien Van Impe (BEL) | Sonolor–Lejeune | + 15' 01" |
| 7 | Francisco Galdós (ESP) | Kas–Kaskol | + 16' 19" |
| 8 | Raymond Poulidor (FRA) | Fagor–Mercier–Hutchinson | + 16' 57" |
| 9 | Tony Houbrechts (FRA) | Salvarani | + 18' 02" |
| 10 | Georges Pintens (BEL) | Dr. Mann–Grundig | + 18' 33" |

== Stage 20a ==
16 July 1970 - Mourenx to Bordeaux, 231 km (144 mi)

Stage 20a result

| Rank | Rider | Team | Time |
|---|---|---|---|
| 1 | Rolf Wolfshohl (FRG) | Fagor–Mercier–Hutchinson | 5h 26' 49" |
| 2 | Franco Mori (ITA) | Molteni | s.t. |
| 3 | Eddy Beugels (NED) | Flandria–Mars | s.t. |
| 4 | Nemesio Jiménez (ESP) | Kas–Kaskol | s.t. |
| 5 | Luciano Dalla Bona (ITA) | Salvarani | s.t. |
| 6 | Jos Huysmans (BEL) | Faemino–Faema | s.t. |
| 7 | Vicente López Carril (ESP) | Kas–Kaskol | s.t. |
| 8 | Johny Schleck (LUX) | Bic | s.t. |
| 9 | Gilbert Bellone (FRA) | Sonolor–Lejeune | s.t. |
| 10 | Eddy Reyniers (BEL) | Dr. Mann–Grundig | s.t. |

General classification after stage 20a

| Rank | Rider | Team | Time |
|---|---|---|---|
| 1 | Eddy Merckx (BEL) | Faemino–Faema | 106h 03' 30" |
| 2 | Joop Zoetemelk (NED) | Flandria–Mars | + 9' 57" |
| 3 | Gösta Pettersson (SWE) | Ferretti | + 13' 21" |
| 4 | Marinus Wagtmans (NED) | Willem II–Gazelle | + 14' 02" |
| 5 | Martin Van Den Bossche (BEL) | Molteni | + 14' 52" |
| 6 | Lucien Van Impe (BEL) | Sonolor–Lejeune | + 15' 01" |
| 7 | Francisco Galdós (ESP) | Kas–Kaskol | + 16' 19" |
| 8 | Raymond Poulidor (FRA) | Fagor–Mercier–Hutchinson | + 16' 57" |
| 9 | Tony Houbrechts (FRA) | Salvarani | + 18' 02" |
| 10 | Raymond Delisle (FRA) | Peugeot–BP–Michelin | + 18' 07" |

== Stage 20b ==
16 July 1970 - Bordeaux, 8.2 km (5.1 mi) (ITT)

Stage 20b result

| Rank | Rider | Team | Time |
|---|---|---|---|
| 1 | Eddy Merckx (BEL) | Faemino–Faema | 10' 32" |
| 2 | Tomas Pettersson (SWE) | Ferretti | + 12" |
| 3 | Luis Ocaña (ESP) | Bic | + 13" |
| 4 | Mogens Frey (DEN) | Frimatic–de Gribaldy | + 15" |
| 5 | Tony Houbrechts (FRA) | Salvarani | + 17" |
| 6 | Joop Zoetemelk (NED) | Flandria–Mars | s.t. |
| 7 | José Antonio González (ESP) | Kas–Kaskol | s.t. |
| 8 | Gösta Pettersson (SWE) | Ferretti | + 18" |
| 9 | Joaquim Agostinho (POR) | Frimatic–de Gribaldy | + 19" |
| 10 | Martin Van Den Bossche (BEL) | Molteni | + 21" |

General classification after stage 20b

| Rank | Rider | Team | Time |
|---|---|---|---|
| 1 | Eddy Merckx (BEL) | Faemino–Faema | 106h 14' 02" |
| 2 | Joop Zoetemelk (NED) | Flandria–Mars | + 10' 14" |
| 3 | Gösta Pettersson (SWE) | Ferretti | + 13' 39" |
| 4 | Marinus Wagtmans (NED) | Willem II–Gazelle | + 15' 00" |
| 5 | Martin Van Den Bossche (BEL) | Molteni | + 15' 13" |
| 6 | Lucien Van Impe (BEL) | Sonolor–Lejeune | + 15' 30" |
| 7 | Francisco Galdós (ESP) | Kas–Kaskol | + 17' 00" |
| 8 | Raymond Poulidor (FRA) | Fagor–Mercier–Hutchinson | + 17' 27" |
| 9 | Tony Houbrechts (FRA) | Salvarani | + 18' 19" |
| 10 | Georges Pintens (BEL) | Dr. Mann–Grundig | + 18' 59" |

== Stage 21 ==
17 July 1970 - Ruffec to Tours, 191.5 km (119.0 mi)

Stage 21 result

| Rank | Rider | Team | Time |
|---|---|---|---|
| 1 | Marino Basso (ITA) | Faemino–Faema | 5h 24' 55" |
| 2 | Jan Janssen (NED) | Bic | s.t. |
| 3 | Walter Godefroot (BEL) | Salvarani | s.t. |
| 4 | Jos Huysmans (BEL) | Faemino–Faema | s.t. |
| 5 | Daniel Van Ryckeghem (BEL) | Dr. Mann–Grundig | s.t. |
| 6 | Cyrille Guimard (FRA) | Fagor–Mercier–Hutchinson | s.t. |
| 7 | Adriano Durante (ITA) | Scic | s.t. |
| 8 | Attilio Benfatto (ITA) | Scic | s.t. |
| 9 | Cees Rentmeester (NED) | Caballero–Laurens | s.t. |
| 10 | Joseph Bruyère (BEL) | Faemino–Faema | s.t. |

General classification after stage 21

| Rank | Rider | Team | Time |
|---|---|---|---|
| 1 | Eddy Merckx (BEL) | Faemino–Faema | 111h 38' 57" |
| 2 | Joop Zoetemelk (NED) | Flandria–Mars | + 10' 14" |
| 3 | Gösta Pettersson (SWE) | Ferretti | + 13' 39" |
| 4 | Marinus Wagtmans (NED) | Willem II–Gazelle | + 15' 00" |
| 5 | Martin Van Den Bossche (BEL) | Molteni | + 15' 13" |
| 6 | Lucien Van Impe (BEL) | Sonolor–Lejeune | + 15' 30" |
| 7 | Francisco Galdós (ESP) | Kas–Kaskol | + 17' 00" |
| 8 | Raymond Poulidor (FRA) | Fagor–Mercier–Hutchinson | + 17' 27" |
| 9 | Tony Houbrechts (FRA) | Salvarani | + 18' 19" |
| 10 | Georges Pintens (BEL) | Dr. Mann–Grundig | + 18' 59" |

== Stage 22 ==
18 July 1970 - Tours to Versailles, 238.5 km (148.2 mi)

Stage 22 result

| Rank | Rider | Team | Time |
|---|---|---|---|
| 1 | Jean-Pierre Danguillaume (FRA) | Peugeot–BP–Michelin | 6h 43' 13" |
| 2 | Jan Janssen (NED) | Bic | s.t. |
| 3 | Pietro Guerra (ITA) | Salvarani | s.t. |
| 4 | Marino Basso (ITA) | Faemino–Faema | s.t. |
| 5 | Cyrille Guimard (FRA) | Fagor–Mercier–Hutchinson | s.t. |
| 6 | Johny Schleck (LUX) | Bic | s.t. |
| 7 | Marinus Wagtmans (NED) | Willem II–Gazelle | s.t. |
| 8 | Jos Huysmans (BEL) | Faemino–Faema | s.t. |
| 9 | Mogens Frey (DEN) | Frimatic–de Gribaldy | s.t. |
| 10 | Romano Tumellero (ITA) | Ferretti | s.t. |

General classification after stage 22

| Rank | Rider | Team | Time |
|---|---|---|---|
| 1 | Eddy Merckx (BEL) | Faemino–Faema | 118h 22' 10" |
| 2 | Joop Zoetemelk (NED) | Flandria–Mars | + 10' 14" |
| 3 | Gösta Pettersson (SWE) | Ferretti | + 13' 39" |
| 4 | Marinus Wagtmans (NED) | Willem II–Gazelle | + 15' 00" |
| 5 | Martin Van Den Bossche (BEL) | Molteni | + 15' 13" |
| 6 | Lucien Van Impe (BEL) | Sonolor–Lejeune | + 15' 30" |
| 7 | Francisco Galdós (ESP) | Kas–Kaskol | + 17' 00" |
| 8 | Raymond Poulidor (FRA) | Fagor–Mercier–Hutchinson | + 17' 27" |
| 9 | Tony Houbrechts (FRA) | Salvarani | + 18' 19" |
| 10 | Georges Pintens (BEL) | Dr. Mann–Grundig | + 18' 59" |

== Stage 23 ==
19 July 1970 - Versailles to Paris, 54 km (34 mi) (ITT)

Stage 23 result

| Rank | Rider | Team | Time |
|---|---|---|---|
| 1 | Eddy Merckx (BEL) | Faemino–Faema | 1h 09' 39" |
| 2 | Luis Ocaña (ESP) | Bic | + 1' 47" |
| 3 | Gösta Pettersson (SWE) | Ferretti | + 2' 15" |
| 4 | Joop Zoetemelk (NED) | Flandria–Mars | + 2' 37" |
| 5 | Tomas Pettersson (SWE) | Ferretti | + 2' 38" |
| 6 | José Antonio González (ESP) | Kas–Kaskol | + 3' 05" |
| 7 | Raymond Poulidor (FRA) | Fagor–Mercier–Hutchinson | + 3' 08" |
| 8 | Mogens Frey (DEN) | Frimatic–de Gribaldy | + 3' 13" |
| 9 | Tony Houbrechts (FRA) | Salvarani | + 3' 15" |
| 10 | Joaquim Agostinho (POR) | Frimatic–de Gribaldy | + 3' 26" |

General classification after stage 23

| Rank | Rider | Team | Time |
|---|---|---|---|
| 1 | Eddy Merckx (BEL) | Faemino–Faema | 119h 31' 49" |
| 2 | Joop Zoetemelk (NED) | Flandria–Mars | + 12' 41" |
| 3 | Gösta Pettersson (SWE) | Ferretti | + 15' 54" |
| 4 | Martin Van Den Bossche (BEL) | Molteni | + 18' 53" |
| 5 | Marinus Wagtmans (NED) | Willem II–Gazelle | + 19' 54" |
| 6 | Lucien Van Impe (BEL) | Sonolor–Lejeune | + 20' 34" |
| 7 | Raymond Poulidor (FRA) | Fagor–Mercier–Hutchinson | + 20' 35" |
| 8 | Tony Houbrechts (FRA) | Salvarani | + 21' 34" |
| 9 | Francisco Galdós (ESP) | Kas–Kaskol | + 21' 45" |
| 10 | Georges Pintens (BEL) | Dr. Mann–Grundig | + 23' 23" |
