= 1970 Tour de France, Prologue to Stage 10 =

Cycling race stages

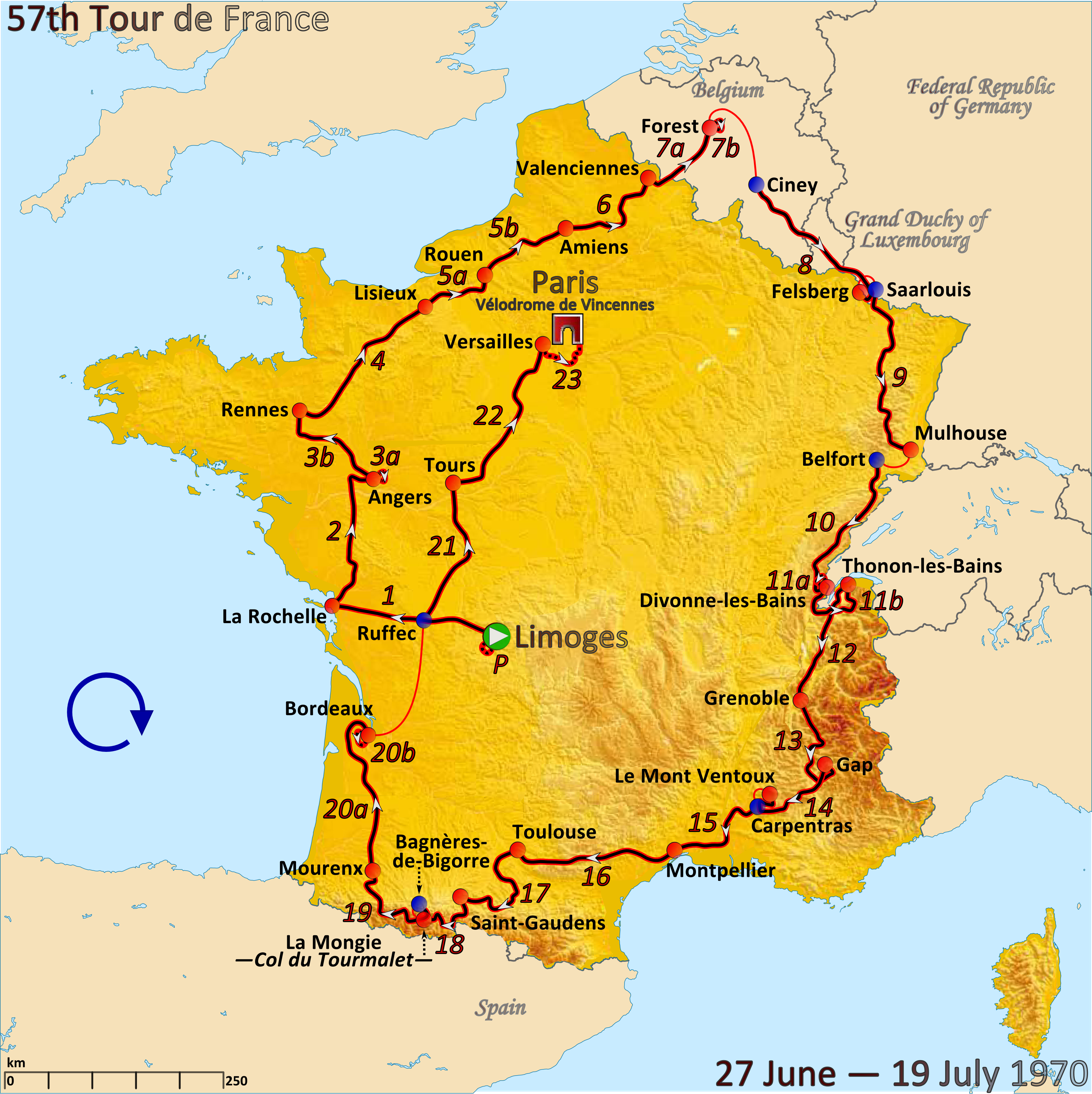
Route of the 1970 Tour de France

The 1970 Tour de France was the 57th edition of Tour de France, one of cycling's Grand Tours. The Tour began in Limoges with a prologue individual time trial on 27 June and Stage 10 occurred on 6 July with a mountainous stage to Divonne-les-Bains. The race finished in Paris on 19 July.

== Prologue ==
27 June 1970 - Limoges, 7.4 km (4.6 mi) (ITT)

Prologue result and General Classification after Prologue

| | Rider | Team | Time |
|---|---|---|---|
| 1 | Eddy Merckx (BEL) | Faemino–Faema | 9' 57" |
| 2 | Charly Grosskost (FRA) | Bic | + 4" |
| 3 | Jan Janssen (NED) | Bic | + 8" |
| 4 | Herman Van Springel (BEL) | Dr. Mann–Grundig | + 9" |
| 5 | Mogens Frey (DEN) | Frimatic–de Gribaldy | + 14" |
| 6 | Luis Ocaña (ESP) | Bic | + 15" |
| 7 | Tomas Pettersson (SWE) | Ferretti | + 19" |
| 8 | José Antonio González (ESP) | Kas–Kaskol | + 20" |
| 9 | Joop Zoetemelk (NED) | Flandria–Mars | s.t. |
| 10 | Gösta Pettersson (SWE) | Ferretti | + 23" |

== Stage 1 ==
27 June 1970 - Limoges to La Rochelle, 224.5 km (139.5 mi)

Stage 1 result

| Rank | Rider | Team | Time |
|---|---|---|---|
| 1 | Cyrille Guimard (FRA) | Fagor–Mercier–Hutchinson | 5h 50' 24" |
| 2 | Jan Janssen (NED) | Bic | s.t. |
| 3 | Eddy Merckx (BEL) | Faemino–Faema | s.t. |
| 4 | Daniel Van Ryckeghem (BEL) | Dr. Mann–Grundig | s.t. |
| 5 | Harm Ottenbros (NED) | Willem II–Gazelle | s.t. |
| 6 | Leo Duyndam (NED) | Caballero–Laurens | s.t. |
| 7 | Cees Zoontjens (NED) | Caballero–Laurens | s.t. |
| 8 | Albert Van Vlierberghe (BEL) | Ferretti | s.t. |
| 9 | Gerard Vianen (NED) | Caballero–Laurens | s.t. |
| 10 | Eddy Peelman (BEL) | Fagor–Mercier–Hutchinson | s.t. |

General classification after stage 1

| Rank | Rider | Team | Time |
|---|---|---|---|
| 1 | Eddy Merckx (BEL) | Faemino–Faema | 6h 00' 16" |
| 2 | Jan Janssen (NED) | Bic | + 3" |
| 3 | Charly Grosskost (FRA) | Bic | + 9" |
| 4 | Herman Van Springel (BEL) | Dr. Mann–Grundig | + 14" |
| 5 | Cyrille Guimard (FRA) | Fagor–Mercier–Hutchinson | + 15" |
| 6 | Mogens Frey (DEN) | Frimatic–de Gribaldy | + 19" |
| 7 | Luis Ocaña (ESP) | Bic | + 20" |
| 8 | Tomas Pettersson (SWE) | Ferretti | + 24" |
| 9 | José Antonio González (ESP) | Kas–Kaskol | + 25" |
| 10 | Joop Zoetemelk (NED) | Flandria–Mars | + s.t. |

== Stage 2 ==
28 June 1970 - La Rochelle to Angers, 200 km (124.3 mi)

Stage 2 result

| Rank | Rider | Team | Time |
|---|---|---|---|
| 1 | Italo Zilioli (ITA) | Faemino–Faema | 4h 41' 19" |
| 2 | Georges Vandenberghe (BEL) | Faemino–Faema | + 1" |
| 3 | Walter Godefroot (BEL) | Salvarani | + 2" |
| 4 | Roland Berland (FRA) | Bic | + 16" |
| 5 | Erik De Vlaeminck (BEL) | Flandria–Mars | + 24" |
| 6 | Roger De Vlaeminck (BEL) | Flandria–Mars | s.t. |
| 7 | Harm Ottenbros (NED) | Willem II–Gazelle | s.t. |
| 8 | Daniel Van Ryckeghem (BEL) | Dr. Mann–Grundig | s.t. |
| 9 | Jan Serpenti (NED) | Willem II–Gazelle | s.t. |
| 10 | Pieter Nassen (BEL) | Flandria–Mars | s.t. |

General classification after stage 2

| Rank | Rider | Team | Time |
|---|---|---|---|
| 1 | Italo Zilioli (ITA) | Faemino–Faema | 10h 41' 55" |
| 2 | Eddy Merckx (BEL) | Faemino–Faema | + 4" |
| 3 | Jan Janssen (NED) | Bic | + 7" |
| 4 | Charly Grosskost (FRA) | Bic | + 13" |
| 5 | Leo Duyndam (NED) | Caballero–Laurens | + 21" |
| 6 | Mogens Frey (DEN) | Frimatic–de Gribaldy | + 23" |
| 7 | Georges Vandenberghe (BEL) | Faemino–Faema | + 26" |
| 8 | Herman Van Springel (BEL) | Dr. Mann–Grundig | + 31" |
| 9 | Cyrille Guimard (FRA) | Fagor–Mercier–Hutchinson | + 32" |
| 10 | Roger De Vlaeminck (BEL) | Flandria–Mars | + 35" |

== Stage 3a ==
29 June 1970 - Angers, 10.7 km (6.6 mi) (TTT)

Stage 3a result

| Rank | Team | Time |
|---|---|---|
| 1 | Faemino–Faema | 1h 07' 13" |
| 2 | Willem II–Gazelle | + 1' 05" |
| 3 | Molteni | + 1' 22" |
| 4 | Dr. Mann–Grundig | + 1' 30" |
| 5 | Caballero–Laurens | + 1' 46" |
| 6 | Ferretti | + 2' 04" |
| 7 | Flandria–Mars | + 2' 12" |
| 8 | Bic | + 2' 13" |
| 9 | Sonolor–Lejeune | + 2' 32" |
| 10 | Salvarani | + 2' 33" |

== Stage 3b ==
29 June 1970 - Angers to Rennes, 140 km (87 mi)

Stage 3b result

| Rank | Rider | Team | Time |
|---|---|---|---|
| 1 | Marino Basso (ITA) | Faemino–Faema | 3h 20' 06" |
| 2 | Walter Godefroot (BEL) | Salvarani | s.t. |
| 3 | Cyrille Guimard (FRA) | Fagor–Mercier–Hutchinson | s.t. |
| 4 | Eddy Peelman (BEL) | Fagor–Mercier–Hutchinson | s.t. |
| 5 | Erik De Vlaeminck (BEL) | Flandria–Mars | s.t. |
| 6 | Daniel Van Ryckeghem (BEL) | Dr. Mann–Grundig | s.t. |
| 7 | Georges Vandenberghe (BEL) | Faemino–Faema | s.t. |
| 8 | Michel Grain (FRA) | Frimatic–de Gribaldy | s.t. |
| 9 | Nemesio Jiménez (ESP) | Kas–Kaskol | s.t. |
| 10 | Giuseppe Beghetto (ITA) | Ferretti | s.t. |

General classification after stage 3b

| Rank | Rider | Team | Time |
|---|---|---|---|
| 1 | Italo Zilioli (ITA) | Faemino–Faema | 14h 01' 41" |
| 2 | Eddy Merckx (BEL) | Faemino–Faema | + 4" |
| 3 | Georges Vandenberghe (BEL) | Faemino–Faema | + 26" |
| 4 | Jan Janssen (NED) | Bic | + 27" |
| 5 | Charly Grosskost (FRA) | Bic | + 33" |
| 6 | Mogens Frey (DEN) | Frimatic–de Gribaldy | + 43" |
| 7 | Cyrille Guimard (FRA) | Fagor–Mercier–Hutchinson | + 47" |
| 8 | Walter Godefroot (BEL) | Salvarani | + 49" |
| 9 | Herman Van Springel (BEL) | Dr. Mann–Grundig | + 51" |
| 10 | Roger De Vlaeminck (BEL) | Flandria–Mars | + 55" |

== Stage 4 ==
30 June 1970 - Rennes to Lisieux, 229 km (142 mi)

Stage 4 result

| Rank | Rider | Team | Time |
|---|---|---|---|
| 1 | Walter Godefroot (BEL) | Salvarani | 5h 27' 07" |
| 2 | Roger De Vlaeminck (BEL) | Flandria–Mars | s.t. |
| 3 | Herman Van Springel (BEL) | Dr. Mann–Grundig | s.t. |
| 4 | Jan Janssen (NED) | Bic | s.t. |
| 5 | Eddy Merckx (BEL) | Faemino–Faema | s.t. |
| 6 | Italo Zilioli (ITA) | Faemino–Faema | s.t. |
| 7 | Raymond Poulidor (FRA) | Fagor–Mercier–Hutchinson | s.t. |
| 8 | Willy Van Neste (BEL) | Dr. Mann–Grundig | s.t. |
| 9 | Joop Zoetemelk (NED) | Flandria–Mars | + 5" |
| 10 | Georges Pintens (BEL) | Dr. Mann–Grundig | s.t. |

General classification after stage 4

| Rank | Rider | Team | Time |
|---|---|---|---|
| 1 | Italo Zilioli (ITA) | Faemino–Faema | 19h 28' 48" |
| 2 | Eddy Merckx (BEL) | Faemino–Faema | + 4" |
| 3 | Jan Janssen (NED) | Bic | + 27" |
| 4 | Walter Godefroot (BEL) | Salvarani | + 29" |
| 5 | Roger De Vlaeminck (BEL) | Flandria–Mars | + 45" |
| 6 | Herman Van Springel (BEL) | Dr. Mann–Grundig | + 46" |
| 7 | Tomas Pettersson (SWE) | Ferretti | + 1' 06" |
| 8 | Raymond Poulidor (FRA) | Fagor–Mercier–Hutchinson | s.t. |
| 9 | Joop Zoetemelk (NED) | Flandria–Mars | + 1' 07" |
| 10 | Luis Ocaña (ESP) | Bic | + 1' 08" |

== Stage 5a ==
1 July 1970 - Lisieux to Rouen, 94.5 km (58.7 mi)

Stage 5a result

| Rank | Rider | Team | Time |
|---|---|---|---|
| 1 | Walter Godefroot (BEL) | Salvarani | 2h 05' 02" |
| 2 | Daniel Van Ryckeghem (BEL) | Dr. Mann–Grundig | s.t. |
| 3 | Roger De Vlaeminck (BEL) | Flandria–Mars | s.t. |
| 4 | Gerard Vianen (NED) | Caballero–Laurens | s.t. |
| 5 | Jan van Katwijk (NED) | Willem II–Gazelle | s.t. |
| 6 | Evert Dolman (NED) | Willem II–Gazelle | s.t. |
| 7 | Eddy Merckx (BEL) | Faemino–Faema | s.t. |
| 8 | Cyrille Guimard (FRA) | Fagor–Mercier–Hutchinson | s.t. |
| 9 | Marino Basso (ITA) | Faemino–Faema | s.t. |
| 10 | Jean Dumont (FRA) | Peugeot–BP–Michelin | s.t. |

General classification after stage 5a

| Rank | Rider | Team | Time |
|---|---|---|---|
| 1 | Italo Zilioli (ITA) | Faemino–Faema | 21h 33' 50" |
| 2 | Eddy Merckx (BEL) | Faemino–Faema | + 4" |
| 3 | Walter Godefroot (BEL) | Salvarani | + 9" |
| 4 | Jan Janssen (NED) | Bic | + 27" |
| 5 | Roger De Vlaeminck (BEL) | Flandria–Mars | + 40" |
| 6 | Herman Van Springel (BEL) | Dr. Mann–Grundig | + 46" |
| 7 | Tomas Pettersson (SWE) | Ferretti | + 1' 06" |
| 8 | Raymond Poulidor (FRA) | Fagor–Mercier–Hutchinson | s.t. |
| 9 | Joop Zoetemelk (NED) | Flandria–Mars | + 1' 07" |
| 10 | Luis Ocaña (ESP) | Bic | + 1' 08" |

== Stage 5b ==
1 July 1970 - Rouen to Amiens, 113 km (70 mi)

Stage 5b result

| Rank | Rider | Team | Time |
|---|---|---|---|
| 1 | Jozef Spruyt (BEL) | Faemino–Faema | 2h 32' 34" |
| 2 | Leo Duyndam (NED) | Caballero–Laurens | + 1" |
| 3 | Roger De Vlaeminck (BEL) | Flandria–Mars | + 11" |
| 4 | Eric Leman (BEL) | Flandria–Mars | s.t. |
| 5 | Erik De Vlaeminck (BEL) | Flandria–Mars | s.t. |
| 6 | Marino Basso (ITA) | Faemino–Faema | s.t. |
| 7 | Eddy Merckx (BEL) | Faemino–Faema | s.t. |
| 8 | Eddy Peelman (BEL) | Fagor–Mercier–Hutchinson | s.t. |
| 9 | Jan van Katwijk (NED) | Willem II–Gazelle | s.t. |
| 10 | Marinus Wagtmans (NED) | Willem II–Gazelle | s.t. |

General classification after stage 5b

| Rank | Rider | Team | Time |
|---|---|---|---|
| 1 | Italo Zilioli (ITA) | Faemino–Faema | 24h 06' 35" |
| 2 | Eddy Merckx (BEL) | Faemino–Faema | + 4" |
| 3 | Walter Godefroot (BEL) | Salvarani | + 9" |
| 4 | Jan Janssen (NED) | Bic | + 27" |
| 5 | Roger De Vlaeminck (BEL) | Flandria–Mars | + 35" |
| 6 | Herman Van Springel (BEL) | Dr. Mann–Grundig | + 46" |
| 7 | Tomas Pettersson (SWE) | Ferretti | + 1' 06" |
| 8 | Raymond Poulidor (FRA) | Fagor–Mercier–Hutchinson | s.t. |
| 9 | Joop Zoetemelk (NED) | Flandria–Mars | + 1' 07" |
| 10 | Luis Ocaña (ESP) | Bic | + 1' 08" |

== Stage 6 ==
2 July 1970 - Amiens to Valenciennes, 135.5 km (84.2 mi)

Finishing times recorded at the entrance to the Valenciennes velodrome, before the finishing line.

Stage 6 result

| Rank | Rider | Team | Time |
|---|---|---|---|
| 1 | Roger De Vlaeminck (BEL) | Flandria–Mars | 3h 05' 50" |
| 2 | Harry Steevens (NED) | Caballero–Laurens | 3h 05' 47" |
| 3 | Jan Janssen (NED) | Bic | 3h 05' 50" |
| 4 | José Antonio González (ESP) | Kas–Kaskol | 3h 05' 47" |
| 5 | Walter Godefroot (BEL) | Salvarani | 3h 05' 50" |
| 6 | Martin Van Den Bossche (BEL) | Molteni | s.t. |
| 7 | Eddy Merckx (BEL) | Faemino–Faema | s.t. |
| 8 | Herman Van Springel (BEL) | Dr. Mann–Grundig | s.t. |
| 9 | Rolf Wolfshohl (FRG) | Fagor–Mercier–Hutchinson | s.t. |
| 10 | Raymond Poulidor (FRA) | Fagor–Mercier–Hutchinson | s.t. |

General classification after stage 6

| Rank | Rider | Team | Time |
|---|---|---|---|
| 1 | Eddy Merckx (BEL) | Faemino–Faema | 27h 12' 29" |
| 2 | Walter Godefroot (BEL) | Salvarani | + 5" |
| 3 | Roger De Vlaeminck (BEL) | Flandria–Mars | + 11" |
| 4 | Jan Janssen (NED) | Bic | + 18" |
| 5 | Herman Van Springel (BEL) | Dr. Mann–Grundig | + 42" |
| 6 | Italo Zilioli (ITA) | Faemino–Faema | + 57" |
| 7 | Raymond Poulidor (FRA) | Fagor–Mercier–Hutchinson | + 1' 02" |
| 8 | Joop Zoetemelk (NED) | Flandria–Mars | + 1' 03" |
| 9 | José Antonio González (ESP) | Kas–Kaskol | + 1' 52" |
| 10 | Luis Ocaña (ESP) | Bic | + 1' 54" |

== Stage 7a ==
3 July 1970 - Valenciennes to Forest, 119 km (74 mi)

Stage 7a result

| Rank | Rider | Team | Time |
|---|---|---|---|
| 1 | Eddy Merckx (BEL) | Faemino–Faema | 2h 51' 11" |
| 2 | Lucien Van Impe (BEL) | Sonolor–Lejeune | + 10" |
| 3 | Tony Houbrechts (FRA) | Salvarani | + 1' 20" |
| 4 | Walter Godefroot (BEL) | Salvarani | s.t. |
| 5 | Daniel Van Ryckeghem (BEL) | Dr. Mann–Grundig | s.t. |
| 6 | Martin Van Den Bossche (BEL) | Molteni | s.t. |
| 7 | Joop Zoetemelk (NED) | Flandria–Mars | s.t. |
| 8 | Cyrille Guimard (FRA) | Fagor–Mercier–Hutchinson | s.t. |
| 9 | Harry Steevens (NED) | Caballero–Laurens | s.t. |
| 10 | Jan Janssen (NED) | Bic | s.t. |

General classification after stage 7a

| Rank | Rider | Team | Time |
|---|---|---|---|
| 1 | Eddy Merckx (BEL) | Faemino–Faema | 30h 03' 20" |
| 2 | Walter Godefroot (BEL) | Salvarani | + 1' 45" |
| 3 | Roger De Vlaeminck (BEL) | Flandria–Mars | + 1' 51" |
| 4 | Jan Janssen (NED) | Bic | + 1' 58" |
| 5 | Herman Van Springel (BEL) | Dr. Mann–Grundig | + 2' 22" |
| 6 | Italo Zilioli (ITA) | Faemino–Faema | + 2' 37" |
| 7 | Raymond Poulidor (FRA) | Fagor–Mercier–Hutchinson | + 2' 42" |
| 8 | Joop Zoetemelk (NED) | Flandria–Mars | + 2' 43" |
| 9 | José Antonio González (ESP) | Kas–Kaskol | + 3' 32" |
| 10 | Luis Ocaña (ESP) | Bic | + 3' 34" |

== Stage 7b ==
3 July 1970 - Forest, 7.2 km (4.5 mi) (ITT)

Stage 7b result

| Rank | Rider | Team | Time |
|---|---|---|---|
| 1 | José Antonio González (ESP) | Kas–Kaskol | 10' 01" |
| 2 | Eddy Merckx (BEL) | Faemino–Faema | + 3" |
| 3 | Charly Grosskost (FRA) | Bic | + 5" |
| 4 | Luis Ocaña (ESP) | Bic | + 7" |
| 5 | Joop Zoetemelk (NED) | Flandria–Mars | + 9" |
| 6 | Georges Pintens (BEL) | Dr. Mann–Grundig | + 10" |
| 7 | Tomas Pettersson (SWE) | Ferretti | s.t. |
| 8 | Joseph Bruyère (BEL) | Faemino–Faema | + 12" |
| 9 | Herman Van Springel (BEL) | Dr. Mann–Grundig | + 13" |
| 10 | Jan Janssen (NED) | Bic | + 14" |

General classification after stage 7b

| Rank | Rider | Team | Time |
|---|---|---|---|
| 1 | Eddy Merckx (BEL) | Faemino–Faema | 30h 13' 34" |
| 2 | Walter Godefroot (BEL) | Salvarani | + 2' 07" |
| 3 | Jan Janssen (NED) | Bic | + 2' 09" |
| 4 | Herman Van Springel (BEL) | Dr. Mann–Grundig | + 2' 32" |
| 5 | Joop Zoetemelk (NED) | Flandria–Mars | + 2' 49" |
| 6 | Raymond Poulidor (FRA) | Fagor–Mercier–Hutchinson | + 3' 01" |
| 7 | Italo Zilioli (ITA) | Faemino–Faema | + 3' 04" |
| 8 | José Antonio González (ESP) | Kas–Kaskol | + 3' 29" |
| 9 | Luis Ocaña (ESP) | Bic | + 3' 38" |
| 10 | Georges Pintens (BEL) | Dr. Mann–Grundig | + 3' 55" |

== Stage 8 ==
4 July 1970 - Ciney to Felsberg (Saar), 232.5 km (144.5 mi)

Stage 8 result

| Rank | Rider | Team | Time |
|---|---|---|---|
| 1 | Alain Vasseur (FRA) | Bic | 6h 04' 16" |
| 2 | Walter Godefroot (BEL) | Salvarani | + 1' 25" |
| 3 | Marino Basso (ITA) | Faemino–Faema | s.t. |
| 4 | Cyrille Guimard (FRA) | Fagor–Mercier–Hutchinson | s.t. |
| 5 | Jan Janssen (NED) | Bic | s.t. |
| 6 | Eddy Merckx (BEL) | Faemino–Faema | s.t. |
| 7 | Marinus Wagtmans (NED) | Willem II–Gazelle | s.t. |
| 8 | Harry Steevens (NED) | Caballero–Laurens | s.t. |
| 9 | Cees Zoontjens (NED) | Caballero–Laurens | s.t. |
| 10 | Mogens Frey (DEN) | Frimatic–de Gribaldy | s.t. |

General classification after stage 8

| Rank | Rider | Team | Time |
|---|---|---|---|
| 1 | Eddy Merckx (BEL) | Faemino–Faema | 36h 19' 05" |
| 2 | Walter Godefroot (BEL) | Salvarani | + 1' 57" |
| 3 | Jan Janssen (NED) | Bic | + 2' 09" |
| 4 | Herman Van Springel (BEL) | Dr. Mann–Grundig | + 2' 32" |
| 5 | Joop Zoetemelk (NED) | Flandria–Mars | + 2' 49" |
| 6 | Raymond Poulidor (FRA) | Fagor–Mercier–Hutchinson | + 3' 01" |
| 7 | Italo Zilioli (ITA) | Faemino–Faema | + 3' 04" |
| 8 | José Antonio González (ESP) | Kas–Kaskol | + 3' 29" |
| 9 | Luis Ocaña (ESP) | Bic | + 3' 38" |
| 10 | Georges Pintens (BEL) | Dr. Mann–Grundig | + 3' 55" |

== Stage 9 ==
5 July 1970 - Saarlouis to Mulhouse, 269.5 km (167.5 mi)

Stage 9 result

| Rank | Rider | Team | Time |
|---|---|---|---|
| 1 | Mogens Frey (DEN) | Frimatic–de Gribaldy | 7h 44' 14" |
| 2 | Joaquim Agostinho (POR) | Frimatic–de Gribaldy | s.t. |
| 3 | Marino Basso (ITA) | Faemino–Faema | + 3" |
| 4 | Jan Janssen (NED) | Bic | s.t. |
| 5 | Harry Steevens (NED) | Caballero–Laurens | s.t. |
| 6 | Daniel Van Ryckeghem (BEL) | Dr. Mann–Grundig | s.t. |
| 7 | Walter Godefroot (BEL) | Salvarani | s.t. |
| 8 | Gerard Vianen (NED) | Caballero–Laurens | s.t. |
| 9 | Cyrille Guimard (FRA) | Fagor–Mercier–Hutchinson | s.t. |
| 10 | Marinus Wagtmans (NED) | Willem II–Gazelle | s.t. |

General classification after stage 9

| Rank | Rider | Team | Time |
|---|---|---|---|
| 1 | Eddy Merckx (BEL) | Faemino–Faema | 44h 03' 22" |
| 2 | Walter Godefroot (BEL) | Salvarani | + 1' 57" |
| 3 | Jan Janssen (NED) | Bic | + 2' 09" |
| 4 | Herman Van Springel (BEL) | Dr. Mann–Grundig | + 2' 32" |
| 5 | Joop Zoetemelk (NED) | Flandria–Mars | + 2' 49" |
| 6 | Raymond Poulidor (FRA) | Fagor–Mercier–Hutchinson | + 3' 01" |
| 7 | Italo Zilioli (ITA) | Faemino–Faema | + 3' 04" |
| 8 | José Antonio González (ESP) | Kas–Kaskol | + 3' 29" |
| 9 | Luis Ocaña (ESP) | Bic | + 3' 38" |
| 10 | Georges Pintens (BEL) | Dr. Mann–Grundig | + 3' 55" |

== Stage 10 ==
6 July 1970 - Belfort to Divonne-les-Bains, 241 km (150 mi)

Stage 10 result

| Rank | Rider | Team | Time |
|---|---|---|---|
| 1 | Eddy Merckx (BEL) | Faemino–Faema | 5h 52' 36" |
| 2 | Guerrino Tosello (ITA) | Molteni | s.t. |
| 3 | Georges Pintens (BEL) | Dr. Mann–Grundig | s.t. |
| 4 | Joop Zoetemelk (NED) | Flandria–Mars | + 2" |
| 5 | Francisco Galdós (ESP) | Kas–Kaskol | + 2' 41" |
| 6 | Johny Schleck (LUX) | Bic | s.t. |
| 7 | Evert Dolman (NED) | Willem II–Gazelle | s.t. |
| 8 | Jos van der Vleuten (NED) | Willem II–Gazelle | s.t. |
| 9 | Gösta Pettersson (SWE) | Ferretti | s.t. |
| 10 | Marinus Wagtmans (NED) | Willem II–Gazelle | s.t. |

General classification after stage 10

| Rank | Rider | Team | Time |
|---|---|---|---|
| 1 | Eddy Merckx (BEL) | Faemino–Faema | 49h 55' 58" |
| 2 | Joop Zoetemelk (NED) | Flandria–Mars | + 2' 51" |
| 3 | Georges Pintens (BEL) | Dr. Mann–Grundig | + 3' 55" |
| 4 | Gösta Pettersson (SWE) | Ferretti | + 7' 44" |
| 5 | Herman Van Springel (BEL) | Dr. Mann–Grundig | + 8' 02" |
| 6 | Raymond Poulidor (FRA) | Fagor–Mercier–Hutchinson | + 8' 31" |
| 7 | Italo Zilioli (ITA) | Faemino–Faema | + 8' 34" |
| 8 | Marinus Wagtmans (NED) | Willem II–Gazelle | + 9' 18" |
| 9 | Francisco Galdós (ESP) | Kas–Kaskol | + 9' 33" |
| 10 | Martin Van Den Bossche (BEL) | Molteni | + 9' 41" |
