= 1970 Tour de France =

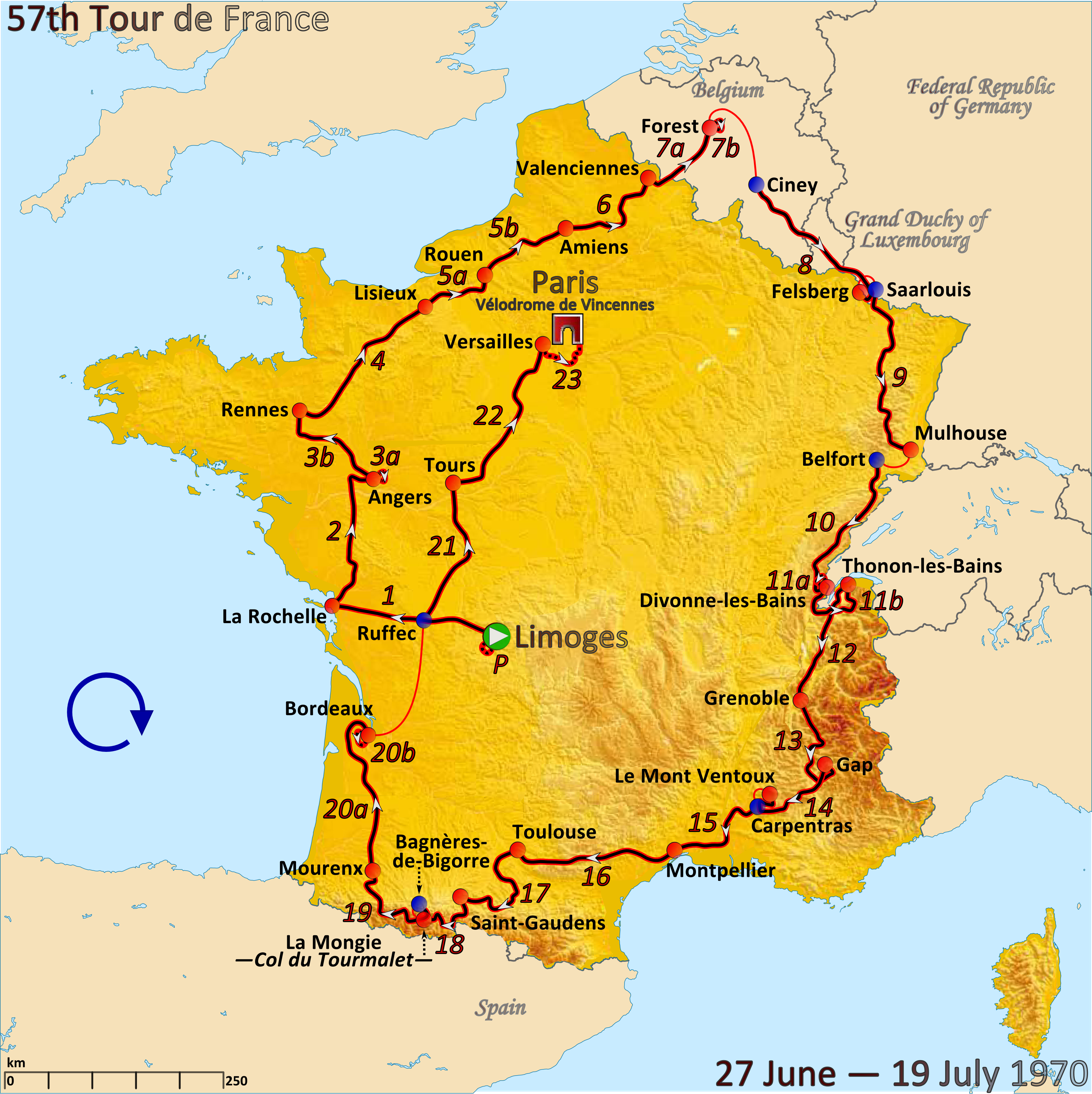
- Route of the 1970 Tour de France

Race details
- Dates: 27 June – 19 July 1970
- Stages: 23 + Prologue, including five split stages
- Distance: 4,254 km (2,643 mi)
- Winning time: 119h 31' 49"

Results
Jersey awarded to the overall winner	Winner	Eddy Merckx (BEL)	(Faemino–Faema)
	Second	Joop Zoetemelk (NED)	(Flandria–Mars)
	Third	Gösta Pettersson (SWE)	(Ferretti)
Jersey awarded to the points classification winner	Points	Walter Godefroot (BEL)	(Salvarani)
	Mountains	Eddy Merckx (BEL)	(Faemino–Faema)
Jersey awarded to the combination classification winner	Combination	Eddy Merckx (BEL)	(Faemino–Faema)
	Sprints	Cyrille Guimard (FRA)	(Fagor–Mercier–Hutchinson)
	Combativity	Eddy Merckx (BEL)	(Faemino–Faema)
	Team	Salvarani	

The 1970 Tour de France was the 57th edition of the Tour de France, one of cycling's Grand Tours. It took place between 27 June and 19 July, with 23 stages covering a distance of 4,254 km (2,643 mi). It was the second victory for Belgian Eddy Merckx, who also won the mountains classification, and nearly won every major jersey for a 2nd year in a row but finished second in the points classification behind Walter Godefroot by five points. The previous year only one rider was able to keep him within 20:00 and in 1970 a mere four other riders were within 20:00, with only debutant Joop Zoetemelk finishing inside 15:00 of Merckx.

== Teams ==
The Tour de France started with 15 teams, of 10 cyclists each, from five different countries. A few days before the Tour started, it became known that Paul Gutty had failed a doping test when he won the French national road championship. Gutty was removed from his Frimatic team, and replaced by Rene Grelin.

The teams entering the race were:

- Faemino–Faema
- Peugeot–BP–Michelin
- Fagor–Mercier–Hutchinson
- Salvarani
- Kas–Kaskol
- Willem II–Gazelle
- Molteni
- Frimatic–de Gribaldy
- Bic
- Sonolor–Lejeune
- Dr. Mann–Grundig
- Flandria–Mars
- Caballero–Laurens
- Ferretti
- Scic

== Pre-race favourites ==
After his dominating victory in the previous year, Merckx was the major favourite. The main competition was expected from Luis Ocaña and Bernard Thévenet. Early in the race, 86 journalists predicted who would be in the top five of the Tour. 85 of them expected Merckx to be in the top five; Ocana was named by 78, Poulidor by 73. Merckx had already won important races in 1970, including Paris–Roubaix, Paris–Nice, the Giro d'Italia and the Belgian national road championship. Luis Ocaña, who had won the Critérium du Dauphiné Libéré and the Vuelta a España, suffered from bronchitis, but still started the Tour, unable to seriously challenge Merckx.

== Route and stages ==
The 1970 Tour de France started on 27 June, and had no rest days. After the financial success of the split stages in the 1969 Tour de France, even more split stages were used in the 1970 Tour. The highest point of elevation in the race was 2,115 m (6,939 ft) at the summit of the Col du Tourmalet mountain pass on stage 19.

Stage characteristics and winners
Stage	Date	Course	Distance	Type	Winner
P	27 June	Limoges	7.4 km (4.6 mi)	Individual time trial	Eddy Merckx (BEL)
1	27 June	Limoges to La Rochelle	224.5 km (139.5 mi)	Plain stage	Cyrille Guimard (FRA)
2	28 June	La Rochelle to Angers	200 km (120 mi)	Plain stage	Italo Zilioli (ITA)
3a	29 June	Angers	10.7 km (6.6 mi)	Team time trial	(Belgium) Faemino–Faema
3b	29 June	Angers to Rennes	140 km (87 mi)	Plain stage	Marino Basso (ITA)
4	30 June	Rennes to Lisieux	229 km (142 mi)	Plain stage	Walter Godefroot (BEL)
5a	1 July	Lisieux to Rouen	94.5 km (58.7 mi)	Plain stage	Walter Godefroot (BEL)
5b	1 July	Rouen to Amiens	223 km (139 mi)	Plain stage	Jozef Spruyt (BEL)
6	2 July	Amiens to Valenciennes	135.5 km (84.2 mi)	Plain stage	Roger De Vlaeminck (BEL)
7a	3 July	Valenciennes to Forest (Belgium)	120 km (75 mi)	Plain stage	Eddy Merckx (BEL)
7b	3 July	Forest (Belgium)	7.2 km (4.5 mi)	Individual time trial	José Antonio González (ESP)
8	4 July	Ciney (Belgium) to Felsberg (Saar) (West Germany)	232.5 km (144.5 mi)	Plain stage	Alain Vasseur (FRA)
9	5 July	Saarlouis (West Germany) to Mulhouse	269.5 km (167.5 mi)	Stage with mountain(s)	Mogens Frey (DEN)
10	6 July	Belfort to Divonne-les-Bains	241 km (150 mi)	Stage with mountain(s)	Eddy Merckx (BEL)
11a	7 July	Divonne-les-Bains	8.8 km (5.5 mi)	Individual time trial	Eddy Merckx (BEL)
11b	7 July	Divonne-les-Bains to Thonon-les-Bains	139.5 km (86.7 mi)	Stage with mountain(s)	Marino Basso (ITA)
12	8 July	Thonon-les-Bains to Grenoble	194 km (121 mi)	Stage with mountain(s)	Eddy Merckx (BEL)
13	9 July	Grenoble to Gap	194.5 km (120.9 mi)	Stage with mountain(s)	Primo Mori (ITA)
14	10 July	Gap to Mont Ventoux	170 km (110 mi)	Stage with mountain(s)	Eddy Merckx (BEL)
15	11 July	Carpentras to Montpellier	140.5 km (87.3 mi)	Plain stage	Rini Wagtmans (NED)
16	12 July	Montpellier to Toulouse	160 km (99 mi)	Plain stage	Albert Van Vlierberghe (BEL)
17	13 July	Toulouse to Saint-Gaudens	190 km (120 mi)	Plain stage	Luis Ocaña (ESP)
18	14 July	Saint-Gaudens to La Mongie	135.5 km (84.2 mi)	Stage with mountain(s)	Bernard Thévenet (FRA)
19	15 July	Bagnères-de-Bigorre to Mourenx	185.5 km (115.3 mi)	Stage with mountain(s)	Christian Raymond (FRA)
20a	16 July	Mourenx to Bordeaux	223.5 km (138.9 mi)	Plain stage	Rolf Wolfshohl (FRG)
20b	16 July	Bordeaux	8.2 km (5.1 mi)	Individual time trial	Eddy Merckx (BEL)
21	17 July	Ruffec to Tours	191.5 km (119.0 mi)	Plain stage	Marino Basso (ITA)
22	18 July	Tours to Versailles	238.5 km (148.2 mi)	Plain stage	Jean-Pierre Danguillaume (FRA)
23	19 July	Versailles to Paris	54 km (34 mi)	Individual time trial	Eddy Merckx (BEL)
	Total		4,254 km (2,643 mi)		

== Race overview ==
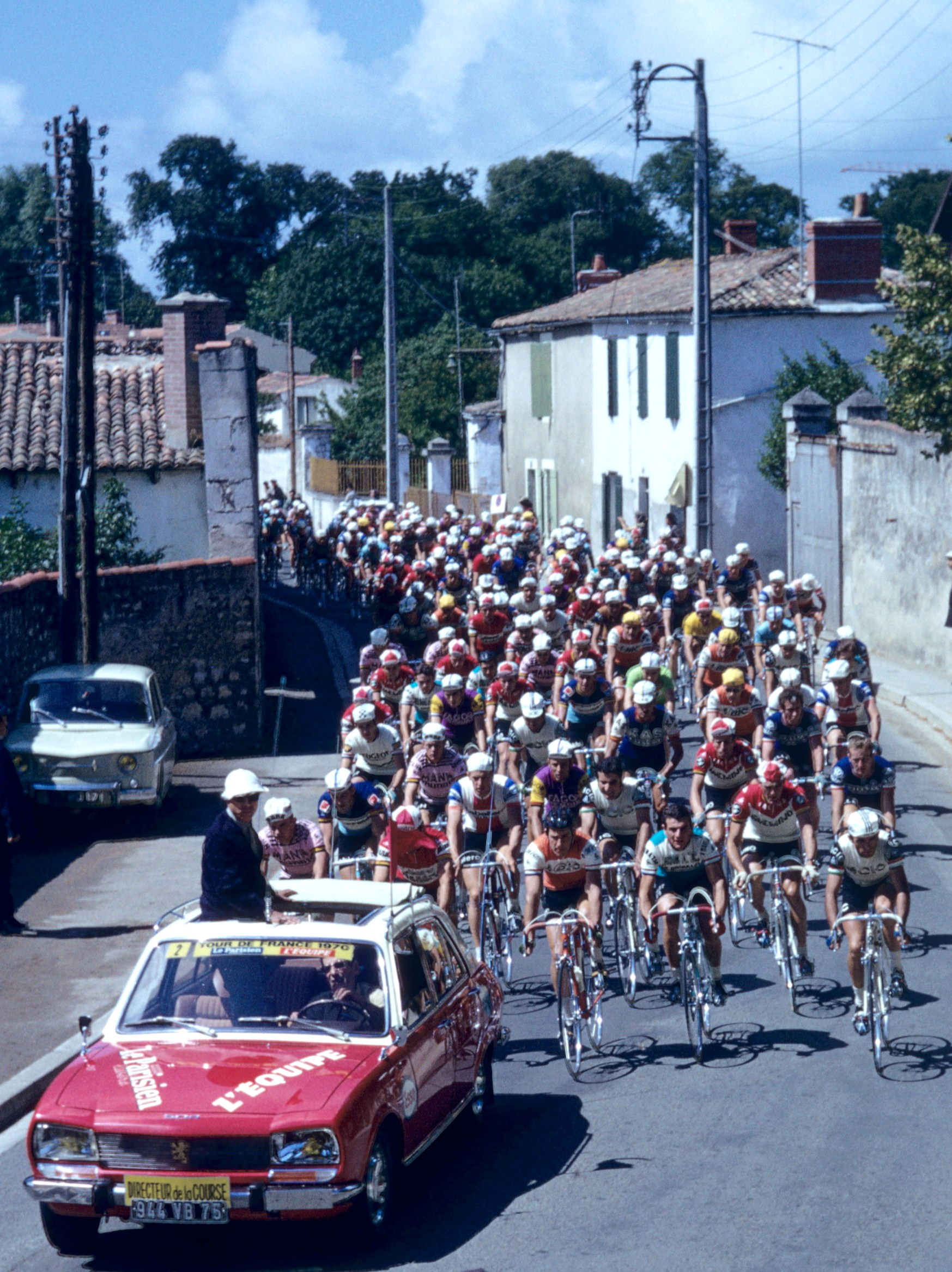
The race director's car and peloton at the start of stage two in La Rochelle

The big favourite Merckx won the opening prologue, but he decided not to try to keep this leading position during the entire race. In the next stage, Merckx' team chased back all the escapees, so the stage ended in a bunch sprint, which was won by Cyrille Guimard as Merckx kept the overall lead. In the second stage, a few cyclists escaped, and two of Merckx' teammates, Italo Zilioli and Georges Vandenberghe, joined the escape. Merckx' teammate Zilioli was ranked highest amongst the escaped cyclists, and none of them were considered competitors for the general classification, so Guillaume Driessens, Merckx's team leader, allowed the breakaway to work, and told Zilioli and Vandenberghe to give their best. Merckx however chased his own teammates. The group stayed away, Zilioli won the sprint and became the new leader, 4 seconds ahead of Merckx. After the stage, Merckx was angry at his team leader, because he had allowed Zilioli to "steal" Merckx' yellow jersey, but Driessens explained to him that the other teams had spent energy to chase Zilioli, and the argument was over. Team Faema won the team time trial in stage 3A keeping Zilioli the leader with Merckx in second place.

Stage 3B was won by Marino Basso who edged Walter Godefroot and Cyrille Guimard in the sprint. Guimard took the green jersey from Jan Janssen as Zilioli kept his narrow lead in the overall situation. On stage 4 Herman Van Springel, who had finished 2nd in the closest Tour in history two years earlier and was in the top 10 of the general classification, made a late attack to go for the stage win on a slight uphill. He was caught right at the finish line and passed at the last possible second by De Vlaeminck and Godefroot, who took the stage win. Stage 5 was another split stage and Godefroot took another stage win with Daniel Van Ryckeghem and De Vlaeminck rounding out the podium. In stage 5B Jozef Spruyt and Leo Duyndam broke away with still an hour or so to race. Duyndam did all of the work and the two of them survived to the finish about ten seconds ahead of the hard charging peloton. At the very end of the stage Spruyt came around the exhausted Duyndam and stole the stage win. Following this Duyndam took over the Most Combative Rider lead from Joaquim Agostinho for the next few stages.

Stage 6 finished at the velodrome in Valenciennes where Roger De Vlaeminck took the stage win in the sprint. During this stage Zilioli had a flat tire. Normally, if the leader in the Tour de France suffers a flat tire, a teammate would offer his wheel, and some teammates would stay with him to help him get back into the peloton. However, this time Merckx was considered more important, and Zilioli was given no help. Zilioli finished the stage one minute behind. Merckx was now in the maillot jaune with Godefroot in 2nd by a few seconds and De Vlaeminck, Janssen and Van Springel less than a minute behind.

Stage 7 was another split stage and in the first segment Merckx went on the offensive and claimed the win. He finished ten seconds ahead of Lucien Van Impe, but won considerable time on those closest to him in the GC. Stage 7B was a short ITT, just over seven kilometers long that was run in the rain. José Antonio González Linares put in the fastest time with Merckx three seconds slower. Notably, Roger De Vlaeminck crashed out during the time trial and had to be taken away in an ambulance. Merckx rode by this scene and this contributed to him taking less risk. At the end of the day Merckx had opened up a legitimate lead on the rest of the field and now only Godefroot and Janssen were within about two minutes as Van Springel, Joop Zoetemelk and Raymond Poulidor were about three minutes behind. As a result of De Vlaeminck crashing out Tour debutant Zoetemelk became the new leader for the Mars–Flandria team.

In stage 8 Alain Vasseur made an escape and survived to the finish, winning the stage by over a minute ahead of the peloton as the overall situation remained the same. In stage 9, Mogens Frey and Joaquim Agostinho, teammates, broke away together. They worked together to stay away, but near the end of the stage Frey stopped working and had Agostinho do all the work, even after his team manager told him to help. In the sprint, Agostinho expected his teammate to give him the victory because he had done all the work, but to his surprise Frey started to come around him. Agostinho then grabbed Frey's handlebars, and crossed the finish line first. The race jury did not allow this, and gave the victory to Frey, putting Agostinho in second place.

Stage 10 included a climb to Les Rousses and on this stage Merckx attacked in an attempt to drop all of his competitors yet again. Only Guerrino Tosello, who was not a threat in the GC, and Georges Pintens as well as Zoetemelk were able to go with him. The time gained over the rest of the contenders was substantial as Merckx took the stage win with Pintens and Tosello crossing the line right behind him and Zoetemelk pulling up and crossing two seconds later. Zoetemelk was now in 2nd place at +2:51, Pintens rose to 3rd at +3:55. The rest of the field was considerably distanced with Gösta Pettersson rising from outside the top 10 all the way up to 4th place at +7:44 because he finished within a group including Francisco Galdós and Johny Schleck who themselves put several minutes of time into the other contenders. 3rd place Pintens was initially riding for Herman Van Springel, who was now in 5th place at +8:02.

Zoetemelk said that he would focus on defending his second place, because he thought Merckx was better than the rest of the world.

Stage 11, a split stage, was the 16th stage of the race and it began with a brief ITT just under ten kilometers. Merckx won with Linares, Zoetemelk and Charly Grosskost tying for 2nd at +0:09. 11B ended in a sprint with Basso taking his second stage win ahead of Godefroot and Janssen, all of whom were competing with Merckx in the Points Competition. Stage 12 was a mountainous stage with five notable climbs and Merckx won the stage with only Luis Zubero finishing within +2:00. He held the mountains jersey as well as the overall lead over Zoetemelk by just over six minutes, Pettersson by ten minutes followed by Van Springel, Poulidor and Zilioli. Stage 13 Andrés Gandarias claimed the Mountains jersey from Merckx early in the stage and Primo Mori managed to stay away for the stage win. Merckx crossed the line with Zubero, Van Impe and Godefroot who kept his hold on the green jersey as Merckx added another +0:38 to his lead over 2nd and 3rd place. After the 13th stage, Merckx heard that Vicenze Giacotto, who started the Faema team around Merckx, had died of a heart attack.

Stage 14 Merckx pushed himself to breaking point to win on Mont Ventoux. This was the first time the Tour returned there since the Death of Tom Simpson. He won the stage, reclaimed the lead in the Mountains and Points classifications and now only Zoetemelk was within +10:00. After he won this stage, Merckx briefly lost consciousness.

The next stages were won by Marinus Wagtmans and Albert Van Vlierberghe with no major changes in the overall standings. Stage 17 was won by Luis Ocaña and stage 18 by Bernard Thévenet and the two of them, along with Zoetemelk, would be the most important rivals for Merckx in the coming years.

Stage 19 included the Col du Tourmalet and the Aubisque and was won by Christian Raymond. Stage 20 was the final split stage and Rolf Wolfshohl won the early stage as Merckx then won the short ITT ahead of Tomas Pettersson, the other Fåglum Brother riding the Tour aside from 3rd place Gosta. Merckx was now ten minutes clear of everyone. Stage 21 was won by Basso with Jean-Pierre Danguillaume being victorious the following day. The final time trial on stage 23, the 29th stage, which ended at the velodrome in Paris, was won by Merckx, with only Ocana, who would nearly defeat Merckx the following year, coming within +2:00.

Walter Godefroot won the Points Classification and Cyrille Guimard won the intermediate sprints. Merckx took the Most Combative Rider as well as the Combination, Mountains and the Overall classifications. Zoetemelk was on the podium in 2nd, Gösta Pettersson in 3rd and Salvarani won the team classification, based on their rider's performance during the final time trial ahead of Kas–Kaskol.

Of the 150 riders to start the Tour 100 finished. The best new rider was Mogens Frey, Jean-Pierre Genet was voted Team-Rider Number one, Luis Ocaña was voted most elegant rider and Lucien Van Impe was voted friendliest rider. There was no award for the best young rider, but Zoetemelk would have been the best rider under 25. The next year there was an award for the youngest rider to finish the Tour, a color television which was won by Zoetemelk.

Merckx was the third cyclist to win the Giro-Tour double in one year; Fausto Coppi and Jacques Anquetil had done it before. Coppi and Anquetil were over thirty years old at their doubles, Merckx was only 25. The margin with the second placed cyclist was less than the year before; according to J.B. Wadley, the difference was that Merckx stopped attacking in 1970 after the Mont Ventoux; had he been inclined to win more time, he probably would have been able to.

== Classification leadership and minor prizes ==
There were several classifications in the 1970 Tour de France, three of them awarding jerseys to their leaders. The most important was the general classification, calculated by adding each cyclist's finishing times on each stage. The cyclist with the least accumulated time was the race leader, identified by the yellow jersey; the winner of this classification is considered the winner of the Tour.

Additionally, there was a points classification, where cyclists got points for finishing among the best in a stage finish, or in intermediate sprints. The cyclist with the most points lead the classification, and was identified with a green jersey.

There was also a mountains classification. The organisation had categorised some climbs as either first, second, third, or fourth-category; points for this classification were won by the first cyclists that reached the top of these climbs first, with more points available for the higher-categorised climbs. The cyclist with the most points lead the classification, but was not identified with a jersey in 1970.

Another classification was the combination classification. This classification was calculated as a combination of the other classifications, its leader wore the white jersey.

The fifth individual classification was the intermediate sprints classification. This classification had similar rules as the points classification, but only points were awarded on intermediate sprints. In 1970, this classification had no associated jersey.

For the team classification, the times of the best three cyclists per team on each stage were added; the leading team was the team with the lowest total time. The riders in the team that led this classification wore yellow caps.

The intermediate sprints classification, sponsored by Miko, was also named "hot spot". In addition, there was a combativity award given after each mass-start stage to the cyclist considered most combative. The split stages each had a combined winner. The decision was made by a jury composed of journalists who gave points. The cyclist with the most points from votes in all stages led the combativity classification. Roger Pingeon won this classification, and was given overall the super-combativity award. The new rider classification was first calculated in 1970. It is not the same as the young rider classification, introduced in 1975. The Souvenir Henri Desgrange was given in honour of Tour founder Henri Desgrange to the first rider to pass the summit of the Col d'Aubisque on stage 19. This prize was won by Raymond Delisle.

Classification leadership by stage
Stage	Winner	General classification	Points classification	Mountains classification (Note: No jersey was awarded to the leader of the mountains classification until a white jersey with red polka dots was introduced in 1975.)	Combination classification	Intermediate sprints classification	Team classification	Combativity	
Stage	Winner	General classification	Points classification	Mountains classification	Combination classification	Intermediate sprints classification	Team classification	Award	Classification
P	Eddy Merckx	Eddy Merckx	Eddy Merckx	no award	no award	no award	Bic	no award	no award
1	Cyrille Guimard	Eddy Merckx	Cyrille Guimard	Pierre Ghisellini	Cyrille Guimard	Cyrille Guimard	Bic	Pierre Ghisellini	Pierre Ghisellini
2	Italo Zilioli	Italo Zilioli	Jan Janssen	Pierre Ghisellini	Italo Zilioli	Régis Delépine	Bic	Italo Zilioli	Italo Zilioli
3a	Faemino–Faema	Italo Zilioli	Jan Janssen	Pierre Ghisellini	Italo Zilioli	Régis Delépine	Faemino–Faema	Joaquim Agostinho	Italo Zilioli
3b	Marino Basso	Italo Zilioli	Cyrille Guimard	Luis Zubero	Italo Zilioli	Cyrille Guimard	Faemino–Faema	Joaquim Agostinho	Italo Zilioli
4	Walter Godefroot	Italo Zilioli	Walter Godefroot	Luis Zubero	Italo Zilioli	Cyrille Guimard	Faemino–Faema	José Catieau	Joaquim Agostinho
5a	Walter Godefroot	Italo Zilioli	Walter Godefroot	Luis Zubero	Eddy Merckx	Cyrille Guimard	Faemino–Faema		Joaquim Agostinho
5b	Jozef Spruyt	Italo Zilioli	Walter Godefroot	Luis Zubero	Eddy Merckx	Cyrille Guimard	Faemino–Faema		Joaquim Agostinho
6	Roger De Vlaeminck	Eddy Merckx	Roger De Vlaeminck	Luis Zubero	Eddy Merckx	Cyrille Guimard	Faemino–Faema	Jaak De Boever	Leo Duyndam
7a	Eddy Merckx	Eddy Merckx	Walter Godefroot	Luis Zubero	Eddy Merckx	Cyrille Guimard	Faemino–Faema	Lucien Van Impe	Leo Duyndam
7b	José Antonio González	Eddy Merckx	Walter Godefroot	Luis Zubero	Eddy Merckx	Cyrille Guimard	Faemino–Faema	Lucien Van Impe	Joaquim Agostinho
8	Alain Vasseur	Eddy Merckx	Walter Godefroot	Luis Zubero	Eddy Merckx	Cyrille Guimard	Faemino–Faema	Alain Vasseur	Joaquim Agostinho
9	Mogens Frey	Eddy Merckx	Walter Godefroot	Luis Zubero	Eddy Merckx	Cyrille Guimard	Faemino–Faema	Joaquim Agostinho	Joaquim Agostinho
10	Eddy Merckx	Eddy Merckx	Walter Godefroot	Eddy Merckx	Eddy Merckx	Cyrille Guimard	Faemino–Faema	Eddy Merckx	Joaquim Agostinho
11a	Eddy Merckx	Eddy Merckx	Walter Godefroot	Eddy Merckx	Eddy Merckx	Cyrille Guimard	Faemino–Faema		Joaquim Agostinho
11b	Marino Basso	Eddy Merckx	Walter Godefroot	Eddy Merckx	Eddy Merckx	Cyrille Guimard	Faemino–Faema		Joaquim Agostinho
12	Eddy Merckx	Eddy Merckx	Walter Godefroot	Eddy Merckx	Eddy Merckx	Cyrille Guimard	Dr. Mann–Grundig	Andrés Gandarias	Eddy Merckx
13	Primo Mori	Eddy Merckx	Walter Godefroot	Eddy Merckx	Eddy Merckx	Cyrille Guimard	Faemino–Faema	Primo Mori	Eddy Merckx
14	Eddy Merckx	Eddy Merckx	Eddy Merckx	Eddy Merckx	Eddy Merckx	Cyrille Guimard	Kas–Kaskol	Eddy Merckx	Eddy Merckx
15	Rini Wagtmans	Eddy Merckx	Eddy Merckx	Eddy Merckx	Eddy Merckx	Cyrille Guimard	Kas–Kaskol	Eddy Merckx	Eddy Merckx
16	Albert Van Vlierberghe	Eddy Merckx	Walter Godefroot	Eddy Merckx	Eddy Merckx	Cyrille Guimard	Kas–Kaskol	Attilio Benfatto	Eddy Merckx
17	Luis Ocaña	Eddy Merckx	Walter Godefroot	Eddy Merckx	Eddy Merckx	Cyrille Guimard	Kas–Kaskol	Luis Ocaña	Eddy Merckx
18	Bernard Thévenet	Eddy Merckx	Eddy Merckx	Eddy Merckx	Eddy Merckx	Cyrille Guimard	Kas–Kaskol	Raymond Delisle	Eddy Merckx
19	Christian Raymond	Eddy Merckx	Walter Godefroot	Eddy Merckx	Eddy Merckx	Cyrille Guimard	Kas–Kaskol	Raymond Delisle	Eddy Merckx
20a	Rolf Wolfshohl	Eddy Merckx	Walter Godefroot	Eddy Merckx	Eddy Merckx	Cyrille Guimard	Kas–Kaskol	Gilbert Bellone	Eddy Merckx
20b	Eddy Merckx	Eddy Merckx	Walter Godefroot	Eddy Merckx	Eddy Merckx	Cyrille Guimard	Kas–Kaskol	Gilbert Bellone	Eddy Merckx
21	Marino Basso	Eddy Merckx	Walter Godefroot	Eddy Merckx	Eddy Merckx	Cyrille Guimard	Kas–Kaskol	Jean-Pierre Danguillaume	Eddy Merckx
22	Jean-Pierre Danguillaume	Eddy Merckx	Walter Godefroot	Eddy Merckx	Eddy Merckx	Cyrille Guimard	Kas–Kaskol	Jean-Pierre Danguillaume	Eddy Merckx
23	Eddy Merckx	Eddy Merckx	Walter Godefroot	Eddy Merckx	Eddy Merckx	Cyrille Guimard	Salvarani		Eddy Merckx
Final		Eddy Merckx	Walter Godefroot	Eddy Merckx	Eddy Merckx	Cyrille Guimard	Salvarani	Eddy Merckx	

- During the stages when Merckx was leading the general classification and the points classification, Merckx wore the yellow jersey and the number two of the points classification was wearing a black/green jersey. When Merckx was leading the general classification and the combination classification, the number two of the combination classification wore a black/white jersey.

== Final standings ==
Legend
A yellow jersey.	Denotes the winner of the general classification	A green jersey.	Denotes the winner of the points classification
A white jersey.	Denotes the winner of the combination classification		

=== General classification ===
Final general classification (1–10)
Rank	Rider	Team	Time
1	Eddy Merckx (BEL)	Faemino–Faema	119h 31' 49"
2	Joop Zoetemelk (NED)	Flandria–Mars	+ 12' 41"
3	Gösta Pettersson (SWE)	Ferretti	+ 15' 54"
4	Martin Vandenbossche (BEL)	Molteni	+ 18' 53"
5	Rini Wagtmans (NED)	Willem II–Gazelle	+ 19' 54"
6	Lucien Van Impe (BEL)	Sonolor–Lejeune	+ 20' 34"
7	Raymond Poulidor (FRA)	Fagor–Mercier–Hutchinson	+ 20' 35"
8	Antoon Houbrechts (BEL)	Salvarani	+ 21' 34"
9	Francisco Galdós (ESP)	Kas–Kaskol	+ 21' 45"
10	Georges Pintens (BEL)	Dr. Mann–Grundig	+ 23' 23"

Final general classification (11–100)
Rank	Rider	Team	Time
11	Raymond Delisle (FRA)	Peugeot–BP–Michelin	+ 23' 59"
12	Franco Balmamion (ITA)	Salvarani	+ 25' 10"
13	Italo Zilioli (ITA)	Faemino–Faema	+ 26' 17"
14	Joaquim Agostinho (POR)	Frimatic–de Gribaldy	+ 26' 52"
15	Luis Zubero (ESP)	Kas–Kaskol	+ 28' 11"
16	Willy Van Neste (BEL)	Dr. Mann–Grundig	+ 29' 17"
17	Lucien Aimar (FRA)	Sonolor–Lejeune	+ 29' 22"
18	Wladimiro Panizza (ITA)	Salvarani	+ 31' 02"
19	Johny Schleck (LUX)	Bic	+ 32' 19"
20	Andrés Gandarias (ESP)	Kas–Kaskol	+ 35' 22"
21	Jean Dumont (FRA)	Peugeot–BP–Michelin	+ 47' 28"
22	Bernard Vifian (SUI)	Frimatic–de Gribaldy	+ 50' 05"
23	Francisco Gabica (ESP)	Kas–Kaskol	+ 50' 18"
24	Roger Swerts (BEL)	Faemino–Faema	+ 52' 56"
25	Aurelio González (ESP)	Kas–Kaskol	+ 55' 57"
26	Jan Janssen (NED)	Bic	+ 56' 29"
27	Henri Rabaute (FRA)	Fagor–Mercier–Hutchinson	+ 58' 47"
28	Primo Mori (ITA)	Salvarani	+ 59' 39"
29	Walter Godefroot (BEL)	Salvarani	+ 1h 02' 36"
30	Jozef Huysmans (BEL)	Faemino–Faema	+ 1h 05' 24"
31	Luis Ocaña (ESP)	Bic	+ 1h 06' 59"
32	Evert Dolman (NED)	Willem II–Gazelle	+ 1h 10' 19"
33	Bernard Labourdette (FRA)	Fagor–Mercier–Hutchinson	+ 1h 11' 22"
34	Vicente López Carril (ESP)	Kas–Kaskol	+ 1h 12' 21"
35	Bernard Thévenet (FRA)	Peugeot–BP–Michelin	+ 1h 13' 25"
36	Tomas Pettersson (SWE)	Ferretti	+ 1h 13' 28"
37	Rolf Wolfshohl (FRG)	Fagor–Mercier–Hutchinson	+ 1h 15' 38"
38	Edy Schütz (LUX)	Molteni	+ 1h 16' 05"
39	Guerrino Tosello (ITA)	Molteni	+ 1h 16' 43"
40	Alain Vasseur (FRA)	Bic	+ 1h 17' 24"
41	Robert Bouloux (FRA)	Peugeot–BP–Michelin	+ 1h 18' 21"
42	Pierre Gautier (FRA)	Frimatic–de Gribaldy	+ 1h 18' 34"
43	Ronald De Witte (BEL)	Dr. Mann–Grundig	+ 1h 19' 56"
44	Jos van der Vleuten (NED)	Willem II–Gazelle	+ 1h 22' 46"
45	Harry Steevens (NED)	Caballero–Laurens	+ 1h 23' 21"
46	Jozef Spruyt (BEL)	Faemino–Faema	+ 1h 26' 30"
47	Gerard Vianen (NED)	Caballero–Laurens	+ 1h 27' 04"
48	Albert Van Vlierberghe (BEL)	Ferretti	+ 1h 31' 05"
49	Giacinto Santambrogio (ITA)	Molteni	+ 1h 33' 53"
50	Joseph Bruyère (BEL)	Faemino–Faema	+ 1h 34' 12"
51	Walter Ricci (FRA)	Sonolor–Lejeune	+ 1h 35' 59"
52	Christian Raymond (FRA)	Peugeot–BP–Michelin	+ 1h 36' 27"
53	Franco Mori (ITA)	Molteni	+ 1h 37' 12"
54	André Poppe (BEL)	Dr. Mann–Grundig	+ 1h 38' 27"
55	Mario Anni (ITA)	Molteni	+ 1h 38' 49"
56	José Antonio Gonzalez Linares (ESP)	Kas–Kaskol	+ 1h 39' 01"
57	Jos Deschoenmaecker (BEL)	Dr. Mann–Grundig	+ 1h 40' 17"
58	Jean-Pierre Parenteau (FRA)	Peugeot–BP–Michelin	+ 1h 41' 07"
59	Mogens Frey (DEN)	Frimatic–de Gribaldy	+ 1h 41' 10"
60	Attilio Benfatto (ITA)	Scic	+ 1h 45' 31"
61	Maurice Izier (FRA)	Frimatic–de Gribaldy	+ 1h 47' 26"
62	Cyrille Guimard (FRA)	Fagor–Mercier–Hutchinson	+ 1h 50' 11"
63	Marino Basso (ITA)	Molteni	+ 1h 52' 35"
64	Jean-Pierre Danguillaume (FRA)	Peugeot–BP–Michelin	+ 1h 53' 01"
65	Eddy Reyniers (BEL)	Dr. Mann–Grundig	+ 1h 55' 12"
66	Gabriel Mascaró Febrer (ESP)	Kas–Kaskol	+ 1h 55' 18"
67	Daniel Van Rijckeghem (BEL)	Dr. Mann–Grundig	+ 1h 56' 44"
68	Victor Van Schil (BEL)	Faemino–Faema	+ 2h 00' 04"
69	Gérard David (BEL)	Flandria–Mars	+ 2h 02' 55"
70	José Catieau (FRA)	Sonolor–Lejeune	+ 2h 09' 34"
71	Pietro Guerra (ITA)	Salvarani	+ 2h 10' 07"
72	Raymond Riotte (FRA)	Sonolor–Lejeune	+ 2h 10' 54"
73	Giancarlo Polidori (ITA)	Scic	+ 2h 11' 57"
74	Nemesio Jimenez (ESP)	Kas–Kaskol	+ 2h 12' 26"
75	Frans Mintjens (BEL)	Faemino–Faema	+ 2h 13' 15"
76	Pierre Martelozzo (FRA)	Peugeot–BP–Michelin	+ 2h 19' 59"
77	Roland Berland (FRA)	Bic	+ 2h 20' 28"
78	Harm Ottenbros (NED)	Willem II–Gazelle	+ 2h 20' 52"
79	Michel Perin (FRA)	Fagor–Mercier–Hutchinson	+ 2h 21' 33"
80	Jan van Katwijk (NED)	Willem II–Gazelle	+ 2h 22' 06"
81	Eddy Beugels (NED)	Flandria–Mars	+ 2h 22' 50"
82	Jean-Pierre Genet (FRA)	Fagor–Mercier–Hutchinson	+ 2h 26' 22"
83	Jean-Marie Leblanc (FRA)	Bic	+ 2h 28' 03"
84	Georges Chappe (FRA)	Fagor–Mercier–Hutchinson	+ 2h 30' 30"
85	Michel Coulon (BEL)	Flandria–Mars	+ 2h 31' 35"
86	Cees Zoontjens (NED)	Caballero–Laurens	+ 2h 32' 26"
87	Etienne Antheunis (BEL)	Faemino–Faema	+ 2h 33' 05"
88	Pieter Nassen (BEL)	Flandria–Mars	+ 2h 33' 17"
89	Willy In' t Ven (BEL)	Dr. Mann–Grundig	+ 2h 34'27"
90	Domingo Perurena (ESP)	Fagor–Mercier–Hutchinson	+ 2h 41' 57"
91	Marc Lievens (BEL)	Flandria–Mars	+ 2h 44' 52"
92	Cees Rentmeester (NED)	Caballero–Laurens	+ 2h 47' 07"
93	Romano Tumellero (ITA)	Ferretti	+ 2h 50' 40"
94	René De Bie (BEL)	Dr. Mann–Grundig	+ 2h 58' 50"
95	Sylvain Vasseur (FRA)	Bic	+ 3h 02' 01"
96	Luciano Dalla Bona (ITA)	Salvarani	+ 3h 19' 56"
97	Pierre Ghisellini (FRA)	Frimatic–de Gribaldy	+ 3h 21' 49"
98	Jaak De Boever (BEL)	Flandria–Mars	+ 3h 22' 04"
99	Adriano Durante (ITA)	Scic	+ 3h 29' 47"
100	Frits Hoogerheide (NED)	Willem II–Gazelle	+ 3h 52' 12"

=== Points classification ===
Final points classification (1–10)
Rank	Rider	Team	Points
1	Walter Godefroot (BEL)	Salvarani	212
2	Eddy Merckx (BEL)	Faemino–Faema	207
3	Marino Basso (ITA)	Molteni	161
4	Jan Janssen (NED)	Bic	151
5	Cyrille Guimard (FRA)	Fagor–Mercier–Hutchinson	138
6	Rini Wagtmans (NED)	Willem II–Gazelle	116
7	Daniel Van Rijckeghem (BEL)	Dr. Mann–Grundig	100
8	Harry Steevens (NED)	Caballero–Laurens	77.5
9	Luis Ocaña (ESP)	Bic	75
10	Mogens Frey (DEN)	Frimatic–de Gribaldy	73

=== Mountains classification ===
Final mountains classification (1–10)
Rank	Rider	Team	Points
1	Eddy Merckx (BEL)	Faemino–Faema	128
2	Andrés Gandarias (ESP)	Kas–Kaskol	94
3	Martin Vandenbossche (BEL)	Molteni	85
4	Silvano Schiavon (ITA) (Note: Schiavon did not finish the race, but left the race after the last mountain stage. In 1970, the rules were such that Schiavon was still listed in the mountains classification.)	Salvarani	68
5	Lucien Van Impe (BEL)	Sonolor–Lejeune	65
6	Primo Mori (ITA)	Salvarani	64
7	Gösta Pettersson (SWE)	Ferretti	59
8	Raymond Delisle (FRA)	Peugeot–BP–Michelin	57
9	Luis Zubero (ESP)	Kas–Kaskol	52
10	Guerrino Tosello (ITA)	Molteni	32

=== Combination classification ===
Final combination classification (1–5)
Rank	Rider	Team	Points
1	Eddy Merckx (BEL)	Faemino–Faema	4
2	Martin Vandenbossche (BEL)	Molteni	21.5
3	Rini Wagtmans (NED)	Willem II–Gazelle	23
4	Lucien Van Impe (BEL)	Sonolor–Lejeune	25.5
5	Joop Zoetemelk (NED)	Flandria–Mars	32.5

=== Intermediate sprints classification ===
Final intermediate sprints classification (1–10)
Rank	Rider	Team	Points
1	Cyrille Guimard (FRA)	Fagor–Mercier–Hutchinson	67
2	Giancarlo Polidori (ITA)	Scic	48
3	Jaak De Boever (BEL)	Flandria–Mars	22
4	Pieter Nassen (BEL)	Flandria–Mars	20
5	Rolf Wolfshohl (FRG)	Fagor–Mercier–Hutchinson	18
6	Jean-Pierre Danguillaume (FRA)	Peugeot–BP–Michelin	12
7	Raymond Riotte (FRA)	Sonolor–Lejeune	10
8	José Catieau (FRA)	Sonolor–Lejeune	9
9	Jozef Spruyt (BEL)	Faemino–Faema	8
10	Evert Dolman (NED)	Willem II–Gazelle	8

=== Team classification ===
Final team classification (1–10)
Rank	Team	Time
1	Salvarani	354h 22' 56"
2	Kas–Kaskol	+ 1' 14"
3	Faemino–Faema	+ 9' 45"
4	Sonolor–Lejeune	+ 29' 21"
5	Dr. Mann–Grundig	+ 34' 23"
6	Peugeot–BP–Michelin	+ 35' 35"
7	Molteni	+ 45' 35"
8	Bic	+ 51' 17"
9	Fagor–Mercier–Hutchinson	+ 59' 39"
10	Frimatic–de Gribaldy	+ 1h 04' 11"

=== Combativity classification ===
Final combativity classification (1–10)
Rank	Rider	Team	Points
1	Eddy Merckx (BEL)	Faemino–Faema	366
2	Joaquim Agostinho (POR)	Frimatic–de Gribaldy	340
3	Raymond Delisle (FRA)	Peugeot–BP–Michelin	273
4	Jean-Pierre Danguillaume (FRA)	Peugeot–BP–Michelin	252
5	Andrés Gandarias (ESP)	Kas–Kaskol	176
6	Primo Mori (ITA)	Salvarani	172
7	Gilbert Bellone (ESP)	Sonolor–Lejeune	164
8	Raymond Riotte (FRA)	Sonolor–Lejeune	148
9	Attilio Benfatto (ITA)	Scic	125
10	Pierre Ghisellini (FRA)	Frimatic–de Gribaldy	122

=== New rider classification ===
Final new rider classification (1–10)
Rank	Rider	Team	Points
1	Mogens Frey (DEN)	Frimatic–de Gribaldy	77
2	Joop Zoetemelk (NED)	Flandria–Mars	67
3	Lucien Van Impe (BEL)	Sonolor–Lejeune	36
4	Nemesio Jiménez (ESP)	Kas–Kaskol	34
5	José Antonio González (ESP)	Kas–Kaskol	33
6	Tomas Pettersson (SWE)	Ferretti	31
7	Luis Zubero (ESP)	Kas–Kaskol	27
8	Gösta Pettersson (SWE)	Ferretti	22
9	Jean-Pierre Danguillaume (FRA)	Peugeot–BP–Michelin	21
10	Jan van Katwijk (NED)	Willem II–Gazelle	18

== Aftermath ==
Merckx had been so dominant during the entire Tour, that the organisation was afraid the race would become dull. The director Félix Lévitan announced that rule changes were considered to break the power of Merckx's team, that he was considering to return to national teams, and to reduce the number of time trials in the Tour. The 1971 Tour did not see major changes in rules, but the number of individual time trials decreased from five to two.

== Bibliography ==
- Augendre, Jacques (2016). Guide historique [Historical guide] (PDF) (in French). Paris: Amaury Sport Organisation. Archived (PDF) from the original on 17 August 2016.
- McGann, Bill; McGann, Carol (2008). The Story of the Tour de France: 1965–2007. Vol. 2. Indianapolis: Dog Ear Publishing. ISBN 978-1-59858-608-4.
- Nauright, John; Parrish, Charles (2012). Sports Around the World: History, Culture, and Practice. Vol. 2. Santa Barbara, California: ABC-CLIO. ISBN 978-1-59884-300-2.
- van den Akker, Pieter (2018). Tour de France Rules and Statistics: 1903–2018. Self-published. ISBN 978-1-79398-080-9.
- Wadley, J. B. (1970). Eddy Merckx and the 1970 Tour de France. Keighley, UK: Kennedy Brothers Publishing. OCLC 00483041.
