= Zubero =

Zubero is a surname. Notable people with the surname include:

- Domingo Iturrate Zubero (1901–1927), Spanish Roman Catholic priest
- Luis Zubero (1948–2025), Spanish cyclist

== See also ==
- López-Zubero, another surname
