= 1976 Liège–Bastogne–Liège =

Race details
- Dates: 18 April 1976
- Stages: 1
- Distance: 246.7 km (153.3 mi)
- Winning time: 6h 31' 00"

Results
	Winner	Joseph Bruyère (BEL)	(Molteni–Campagnolo)
	Second	Freddy Maertens (BEL)	(Flandria–Velda–West Vlaams Vleesbedrijf)
	Third	Frans Verbeeck (BEL)	(IJsboerke–Colnago)

The 1976 Liège–Bastogne–Liège was the 62nd edition of the Liège–Bastogne–Liège cycle race and was held on 18 April 1976. The race started and finished in Liège. The race was won by Joseph Bruyère of the Molteni team.

== General classification ==
Final general classification

Rank	Rider	Team	Time
1	Joseph Bruyère (BEL)	Molteni–Campagnolo	6h 31' 00"
2	Freddy Maertens (BEL)	Flandria–Velda–West Vlaams Vleesbedrijf	+ 4' 40"
3	Frans Verbeeck (BEL)	IJsboerke–Colnago	+ 4' 40"
4	Jean-Pierre Danguillaume (FRA)	Peugeot–Esso–Michelin	+ 4' 40"
5	Hennie Kuiper (NED)	TI–Raleigh–Campagnolo	+ 4' 40"
6	Eddy Merckx (BEL)	Molteni–Campagnolo	+ 4' 40"
7	Régis Ovion (FRA)	Peugeot–Esso–Michelin	+ 4' 40"
8	Raymond Poulidor (FRA)	Gan–Mercier–Hutchinson	+ 4' 40"
9	Herman Van Springel (BEL)	Flandria–Velda–West Vlaams Vleesbedrijf	+ 4' 40"
10	Joop Zoetemelk (NED)	Gan–Mercier–Hutchinson	+ 4' 40"
