= López-Zubero =

López-Zubero is a surname. Notable people with the surname include:

- David López-Zubero (born 1959), American competitive swimmer
- Martín López-Zubero (born 1969), American competitive swimmer

== See also ==
- López, another surname
- Zubero, another surname
