= 1975 Omloop Het Volk =

Race details
- Dates: 1 March 1975
- Stages: 1
- Distance: 198 km (123 mi)
- Winning time: 4h 34' 00"

Results
	Winner	Joseph Bruyère (BEL)
	Second	Patrick Sercu (BEL)
	Third	José De Cauwer (BEL)

The 1975 Omloop Het Volk was the 30th edition of the Omloop Het Volk cycle race and was held on 1 March 1975. The race started and finished in Ghent. The race was won by Joseph Bruyère.

== General classification ==
Final general classification
Rank	Rider	Time
1	Joseph Bruyère (BEL)	4h 34' 00"
2	Patrick Sercu (BEL)	+ 37"
3	José De Cauwer (BEL)	+ 37"
4	Roger De Vlaeminck (BEL)	+ 56"
5	Frans Verbeeck (BEL)	+ 1' 02"
6	Eddy Merckx (BEL)	+ 1' 02"
7	André Dierickx (BEL)	+ 1' 02"
8	Jan Raas (NED)	+ 1' 02"
9	Marc Demeyer (BEL)	+ 1' 02"
10	Gerard Vianen (NED)	+ 1' 02"
