= Pierre Gautier =

French cyclist

Personal information
- Born: 20 December 1946 (age 79)

Cycling career
- Sport: Cycling
- Role: Rider

Pierre Gautier (born 20 December 1946) is a French racing cyclist. He rode in the 1970 Tour de France.
