= Bic (cycling team) =

Cycling team (1967–1974)

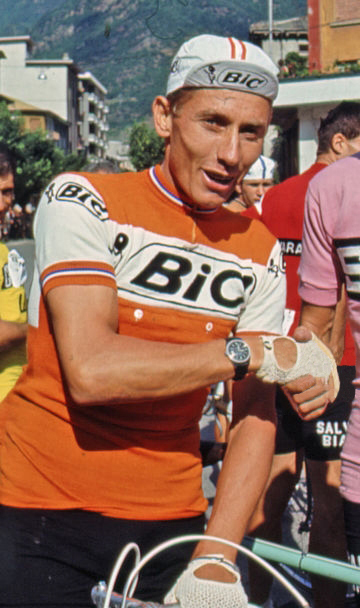
- Jacques Anquetil at the 1967 Giro d'Italia

Team information
- Registered: France
- Founded: 1967
- Disbanded: 1974
- Discipline: Road
- Bicycles: Géminiani; Motobécane

Team name history
- 1967 1968–1974: Bic–Hutchinson; Bic

Bic was a French professional cycling team active from 1967 to 1974. It was sponsored by the French consumer goods company Bic.

== Team rosters ==
=== 1967 ===
Roster in 1967, age as of 1 January 1967:

Rider	Date of birth
Siegfried Adler (GER)	29 March 1943 (aged 23)
Lucien Aimar (FRA)	28 April 1941 (aged 25)
Jacques Anquetil (FRA)	8 January 1934 (aged 32)
Serge Bolley (FRA)	3 December 1944 (aged 22)
Pierre Campagnaro (FRA)	1 July 1943 (aged 23)
Arie den Hartog (NED)	23 April 1941 (aged 25)
Vin Denson (GBR)	24 November 1935 (aged 31)
Jean Graczyk (FRA)	26 May 1933 (aged 33)
Michel Grain (FRA)	6 October 1942 (aged 24)
Jacques Guiot (FRA)	6 September 1945 (aged 21)
Julio Jiménez (ESP)	28 October 1934 (aged 32)

Rider	Date of birth
Christian Leduc (FRA)	9 November 1943 (aged 23)
Paul Lemeteyer (FRA)	4 June 1942 (aged 24)
Yves Lepachelet (FRA)	30 June 1938 (aged 28)
Jean Milesi (FRA)	24 June 1935 (aged 31)
Anatole Novak (FRA)	12 February 1937 (aged 29)
Raymond Riotte (FRA)	16 February 1940 (aged 26)
Jean Stablinski (FRA)	21 May 1932 (aged 34)
Raymond Steegmans (BEL)	15 May 1945 (aged 21)
Jean-Claude Theillière (FRA)	23 May 1944 (aged 22)
Rolf Wolfshohl (GER)	27 December 1938 (aged 28)

=== 1968 ===
Roster in 1968, age as of 1 January 1968:

Rider	Date of birth
Siegfried Adler (GER)	29 March 1943 (aged 24)
Lucien Aimar (FRA)	28 April 1941 (aged 26)
Jacques Anquetil (FRA)	8 January 1934 (aged 33)
Roland Berland (FRA)	26 February 1945 (aged 22)
Serge Bolley (FRA)	3 December 1944 (aged 23)
Arie den Hartog (NED)	23 April 1941 (aged 26)
Jean-Claude Genty (FRA)	17 February 1945 (aged 22)
Pierre Ghisellini (FRA)	17 October 1943 (aged 24)
Jean Graczyk (FRA)	26 May 1933 (aged 34)
Michel Grain (FRA)	6 October 1942 (aged 25)
Charly Grosskost (FRA)	5 March 1944 (aged 23)
Jacques Guiot (FRA)	6 September 1945 (aged 22)
Cees Haast (NED)	19 November 1938 (aged 29)

Rider	Date of birth
Peter Head (GBR)	3 July 1946 (aged 21)
Julio Jiménez (ESP)	28 October 1934 (aged 33)
Paul Lemeteyer (FRA)	4 June 1942 (aged 25)
Gilles Locatelli (FRA)	4 December 1943 (aged 24)
Jean Milesi (FRA)	24 June 1935 (aged 32)
Anatole Novak (FRA)	12 February 1937 (aged 30)
Michel Rousseau (FRA)	5 February 1936 (aged 31)
Edward Sels (BEL)	27 August 1941 (aged 26)
Jean-Claude Theillière (FRA)	23 May 1944 (aged 23)
Willy Van Neste (BEL)	10 March 1944 (aged 23)
Rolf Wolfshohl (GER)	27 December 1938 (aged 29)
Michael Wright (GBR)	25 March 1941 (aged 26)

=== 1969 ===
Roster in 1969, age as of 1 January 1969:

Rider	Date of birth
Lucien Aimar (FRA)	28 April 1941 (aged 27)
Jacques Anquetil (FRA)	8 January 1934 (aged 34)
Luis Balagué (ESP)	29 March 1944 (aged 24)
Gilbert Bellone (FRA)	27 December 1942 (aged 26)
Roland Berland (FRA)	26 February 1945 (aged 23)
Serge Bolley (FRA)	3 December 1944 (aged 24)
Paul Crapez (BEL)	17 April 1947 (aged 21)
José Miguel Echavarri García (ESP)	10 October 1947 (aged 21)
Pierre Gauthier (FRA)	20 December 1946 (aged 22)
Jean-Claude Genty (FRA)	17 February 1945 (aged 23)
Pierre Ghisellini (FRA)	17 October 1943 (aged 25)
Charly Grosskost (FRA)	5 March 1944 (aged 24)
Jan Janssen (NED)	19 May 1940 (aged 28)

Rider	Date of birth
Jean-Marie Leblanc (FRA)	28 July 1944 (aged 24)
Robert Legein (BEL)	31 July 1945 (aged 23)
Anatole Novak (FRA)	12 February 1937 (aged 31)
José Pérez Francés (ESP)	27 December 1936 (aged 32)
Jean Pinault (FRA)	21 June 1947 (aged 21)
José Samyn (FRA)	11 May 1946 (aged 22)
Johny Schleck (LUX)	22 November 1942 (aged 26)
Edward Sels (BEL)	27 August 1941 (aged 27)
Marc Sohet (BEL)	15 June 1947 (aged 21)
Alain Vasseur (FRA)	1 April 1948 (aged 20)
Sylvain Vasseur (FRA)	28 February 1946 (aged 22)
Rolf Wolfshohl (GER)	27 December 1938 (aged 30)
Michael Wright (GBR)	25 March 1941 (aged 27)

=== 1970 ===
Roster in 1970, age as of 1 January 1970:

Rider	Date of birth
Jesús Aranzabal (ESP)	25 December 1939 (aged 30)
Roland Berland (FRA)	26 February 1945 (aged 24)
Serge Bolley (FRA)	3 December 1944 (aged 25)
Paul Crapez (BEL)	17 April 1947 (aged 22)
Philippe Crépel (FRA)	12 January 1945 (aged 24)
Christian Davaine (FRA)	7 May 1948 (aged 21)
André Doyen (BEL)	29 March 1949 (aged 20)
Daniel Ducreux (FRA)	11 February 1947 (aged 22)
Francis Ducreux (FRA)	14 February 1945 (aged 24)
Miguel García (PAR)	10 October 1947 (aged 22)
Jean-Claude Genty (FRA)	17 February 1945 (aged 24)
Charly Grosskost (FRA)	5 March 1944 (aged 25)
Alain Hamy (FRA)	31 July 1945 (aged 24)
Jan Janssen (NED)	19 May 1940 (aged 29)
Jean-Marie Leblanc (FRA)	28 July 1944 (aged 25)
Pierre Masseys (FRA)	26 September 1946 (aged 23)

Rider	Date of birth
Ramón Mendiburu (ESP)	12 March 1940 (aged 29)
Leif Mortensen (DEN)	5 May 1947 (aged 22)
Anatole Novak (FRA)	12 February 1937 (aged 32)
Luis Ocaña (ESP)	9 June 1945 (aged 24)
René Panagiotis (FRA)	3 August 1946 (aged 23)
Michel Quinchon (FRA)	28 August 1949 (aged 20)
Roger Rosiers (BEL)	26 November 1946 (aged 23)
Alain Santy (FRA)	28 August 1949 (aged 20)
Johny Schleck (LUX)	22 November 1942 (aged 27)
Marc Sohet (BEL)	15 June 1947 (aged 22)
Raymond Van Marck (FRA)	5 June 1947 (aged 22)
Alain Vasseur (FRA)	1 April 1948 (aged 21)
Sylvain Vasseur (FRA)	28 February 1946 (aged 23)
Frans Verhaegen (BEL)	22 January 1948 (aged 21)
Michael Wright (GBR)	25 March 1941 (aged 28)

=== 1971 ===
Roster in 1971, age as of 1 January 1971:

Rider	Date of birth
Jesús Aranzabal (ESP)	25 December 1939 (aged 31)
Roland Berland (FRA)	26 February 1945 (aged 25)
Serge Bolley (FRA)	3 December 1944 (aged 26)
Francis Campaner (FRA)	1 February 1946 (aged 24)
Philippe Crépel (FRA)	12 January 1945 (aged 25)
Christian Davaine (FRA)	7 May 1948 (aged 22)
Roger Desmaret (FRA)	31 July 1950 (aged 20)
André Doyen (BEL)	29 March 1949 (aged 21)
Daniel Ducreux (FRA)	11 February 1947 (aged 23)
Francis Ducreux (FRA)	14 February 1945 (aged 25)
Jean-Claude Genty (FRA)	17 February 1945 (aged 25)
Charly Grosskost (FRA)	5 March 1944 (aged 26)
Jacques Guiot (FRA)	6 September 1945 (aged 25)
Jan Janssen (NED)	19 May 1940 (aged 30)
Giovanni Jiménez Ocampo (COL)	30 June 1942 (aged 28)
Bernard Labourdette (FRA)	13 August 1946 (aged 24)
Jean-Marie Leblanc (FRA)	28 July 1944 (aged 26)
Désiré Letort (FRA)	29 January 1943 (aged 27)

Rider	Date of birth
Ramón Mendiburu (ESP)	12 March 1940 (aged 30)
Leif Mortensen (DEN)	5 May 1947 (aged 23)
Anatole Novak (FRA)	12 February 1937 (aged 33)
Luis Ocaña (ESP)	9 June 1945 (aged 25)
Christian Palka (FRA)	15 July 1949 (aged 21)
René Pijnen (NED)	3 September 1946 (aged 24)
Jean Ronsmans (BEL)	6 August 1947 (aged 23)
Roger Rosiers (BEL)	26 November 1946 (aged 24)
Alain Santy (FRA)	28 August 1949 (aged 21)
Guy Santy (FRA)	23 November 1950 (aged 20)
Johny Schleck (LUX)	22 November 1942 (aged 28)
Marc Sohet (BEL)	15 June 1947 (aged 23)
Bernard Van der Linde (FRA)	14 June 1946 (aged 24)
Raymond Van Marck (FRA)	5 June 1947 (aged 23)
Alain Vasseur (FRA)	1 April 1948 (aged 22)
Sylvain Vasseur (FRA)	28 February 1946 (aged 24)
Frans Verhaegen (BEL)	22 January 1948 (aged 22)
Michael Wright (GBR)	25 March 1941 (aged 29)

=== 1972 ===
Roster in 1972, age as of 1 January 1972:

Rider	Date of birth
Jesús Aranzabal (ESP)	25 December 1939 (aged 32)
Roland Berland (FRA)	26 February 1945 (aged 26)
Francis Campaner (FRA)	1 February 1946 (aged 25)
Jaak De Boever (BEL)	29 August 1937 (aged 34)
Roger Desmaret (FRA)	31 July 1950 (aged 21)
Daniel Ducreux (FRA)	11 February 1947 (aged 24)
Francis Ducreux (FRA)	14 February 1945 (aged 26)
Jean-Claude Genty (FRA)	17 February 1945 (aged 26)
Charly Grosskost (FRA)	5 March 1944 (aged 27)
Bernard Labourdette (FRA)	13 August 1946 (aged 25)
Serge Lapébie (FRA)	9 June 1948 (aged 23)
Eric Leman (BEL)	17 July 1946 (aged 25)

Rider	Date of birth
Désiré Letort (FRA)	29 January 1943 (aged 28)
Leif Mortensen (DEN)	5 May 1947 (aged 24)
Anatole Novak (FRA)	12 February 1937 (aged 34)
Luis Ocaña (ESP)	9 June 1945 (aged 26)
Christian Palka (FRA)	15 July 1949 (aged 22)
René Pijnen (NED)	3 September 1946 (aged 25)
Roger Rosiers (BEL)	26 November 1946 (aged 25)
Alain Santy (FRA)	28 August 1949 (aged 22)
Guy Santy (FRA)	23 November 1950 (aged 21)
Johny Schleck (LUX)	22 November 1942 (aged 29)
Alain Vasseur (FRA)	1 April 1948 (aged 23)
Sylvain Vasseur (FRA)	28 February 1946 (aged 25)

=== 1973 ===
Roster in 1973, age as of 1 January 1973:

Rider	Date of birth
Joaquim Agostinho (POR)	7 April 1943 (aged 29)
Roland Berland (FRA)	26 February 1945 (aged 27)
José Catieau (FRA)	17 July 1946 (aged 26)
Jean-Jacques Fussien (FRA)	21 January 1952 (aged 20)
Jean-Claude Genty (FRA)	17 February 1945 (aged 27)
Bernard Labourdette (FRA)	13 August 1946 (aged 26)
Serge Lapébie (FRA)	9 June 1948 (aged 24)
Désiré Letort (FRA)	29 January 1943 (aged 29)
Leif Mortensen (DEN)	5 May 1947 (aged 25)

Rider	Date of birth
Luis Ocaña (ESP)	9 June 1945 (aged 27)
Christian Palka (FRA)	15 July 1949 (aged 23)
René Pijnen (NED)	3 September 1946 (aged 26)
Roger Rosiers (BEL)	26 November 1946 (aged 26)
Alain Santy (FRA)	28 August 1949 (aged 23)
Guy Santy (FRA)	23 November 1950 (aged 22)
Johny Schleck (LUX)	22 November 1942 (aged 30)
Alain Vasseur (FRA)	1 April 1948 (aged 24)
Sylvain Vasseur (FRA)	28 February 1946 (aged 26)

=== 1974 ===
Roster in 1974, age as of 1 January 1974:

Rider	Date of birth
Joaquim Agostinho (POR)	7 April 1943 (aged 30)
Luis Balagué (ESP)	29 March 1944 (aged 29)
Roland Berland (FRA)	26 February 1945 (aged 28)
José Catieau (FRA)	17 July 1946 (aged 27)
Patrice Collinet (FRA)	18 August 1949 (aged 24)
Bernard Croyet (FRA)	8 July 1948 (aged 25)
Bernard Draux (BEL)	8 July 1948 (aged 25)
Jacky Ferrari (FRA)	7 October 1952 (aged 21)
Jean-Jacques Fussien (FRA)	21 January 1952 (aged 21)
Jean-Claude Genty (FRA)	17 February 1945 (aged 28)
Gerben Karstens (NED)	14 January 1942 (aged 31)

Rider	Date of birth
Bernard Labourdette (FRA)	13 August 1946 (aged 27)
Jean-Luc Molinéris (FRA)	25 August 1950 (aged 23)
Leif Mortensen (DEN)	5 May 1947 (aged 26)
Luis Ocaña (ESP)	9 June 1945 (aged 28)
Christian Palka (FRA)	15 July 1949 (aged 24)
Eddy Peelman (BEL)	8 August 1947 (aged 26)
Guy Santy (FRA)	23 November 1950 (aged 23)
Johny Schleck (LUX)	22 November 1942 (aged 31)
Roland Smet (FRA)	18 December 1952 (aged 21)
Alain Vasseur (FRA)	1 April 1948 (aged 25)
Sylvain Vasseur (FRA)	28 February 1946 (aged 27)
