= Alain Vasseur =

French cyclist (born 1948)

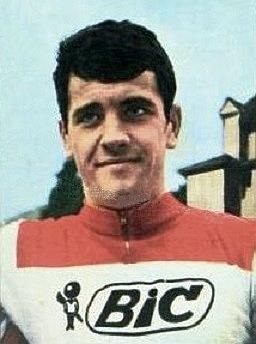
- Alain Vasseur (1971) 'sprint 71', Panini Figurina no. 89.

Personal information
- Full name: Alain Vasseur
- Born: 1 April 1948 (age 78) Cappelle-la-Grande, France

Cycling career
- Sport: Cycling
- Discipline: Road
- Role: Rider

Professional team
- 1969–1974: Bic

Major wins
- Grand Tour Tour de France 1 individual stage (1970)

Alain Vasseur (1 April 1948) was a French professional road bicycle racer. Alain Vasseur is the younger brother of cyclist Sylvain Vasseur, and the father of cyclists Cédric Vasseur and Loïc Vasseur. He competed in the individual road race at the 1968 Summer Olympics.

== Major results ==
1968
1st Paris–Roubaix Espoirs
Tour de l'Avenir

1st Stage 5
1st Stage 8

1969
1st Stage 3 Tour du Nord
1st Overall Four Days of Dunkirk
3rd Polymultipliée
5th Rund um den Henninger Turm
6th Paris-Camembert
10th Overall Paris - Nice
10th GP Ouest France-Plouay
10th Boucles de la Seine
1970
1st Stage 8 Tour de France
6th Overall Four Days of Dunkirk
6th Road race, UCI Road World Championships
1972
1st Stage 4 Etoile des Espoirs
6th Circuit des Frontières
1973
10th Grand Prix de Wallonie
1974
7th Tour du Haut Var
