= Siegfried Adler =

German cyclist

Personal information
- Born: 29 March 1943 (age 83) Görlitz, Germany

Cycling career
- Sport: Cycling
- Role: Rider

Siegfried Adler (born 29 March 1943) is a German racing cyclist. He rode in the 1968 Tour de France.
