= Eddy Reyniers =

Belgian cyclist

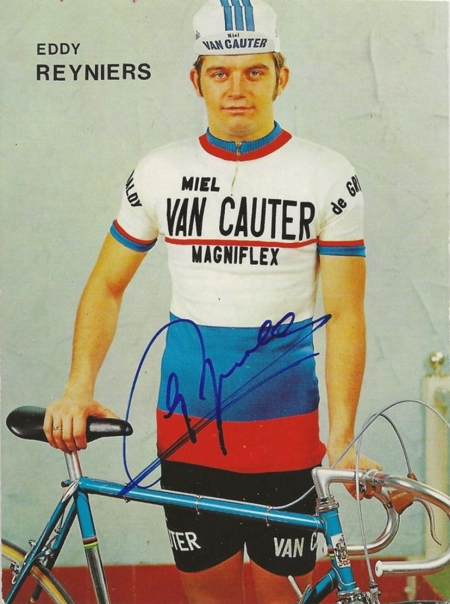
- Reyneirs participating in the 1970 Tour De France

Personal information
- Born: 30 December 1946 Hemiksem, Antwerp, Belgium
- Died: 15 September 2023 (aged 76) Schelle, Antwerp, Belgium

Cycling career
- Sport: Cycling
- Role: Rider

Professional teams
- 1969-1970: Mann - Grundig (Belgium)
- 1971-1971: Hertekamp - Magniflex
- 1972-1972: Van Cauter - Magniflex - de Gribaldy
- 1973-1973: IJsboerke - Bertin
- 1974-1974: IJsboerke - Colne

Eddy Reyniers (30 December 1946 – 15 September 2023) was a Belgian racing cyclist. He rode in the 1970 Tour de France.

Eddy Reyniers was born in the town of Hemiksem in Antwerp Province, Belgium. He rode professionally in the years of 1969 till 1974.
