= Sylvain Vasseur =

French cyclist (born 1946)

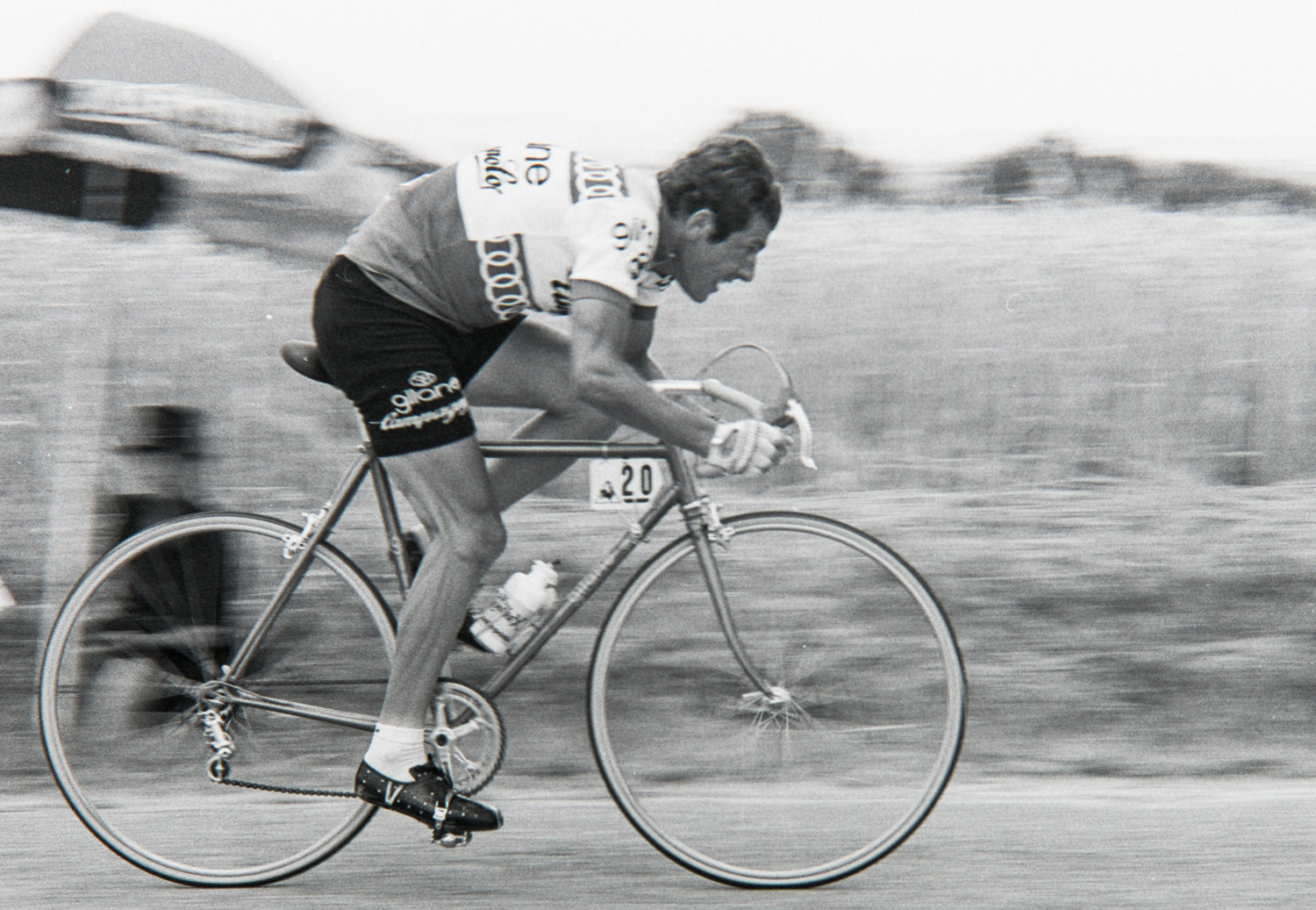
- Vasseur in the 1976 Tour de France

Personal information
- Born: 28 February 1946 (age 80) Capelle-les-Grands, France

Cycling career
- Sport: Cycling
- Current team: Retired
- Role: Rider

Professional teams
- 1969–1974: Bic
- 1975: Super Ser
- 1976–1977: Renault–Gitane–Campagnolo

Sylvain Vasseur (born 28 February 1946) is a French former professional racing cyclist. He rode in six editions of the Tour de France.

== Major results ==
1969
6th Overall Four Days of Dunkirk
7th Circuit des Frontières
1972
1st Overall Tour du Nord
5th Overall Étoile des Espoirs
7th GP de Fourmies
1973
1st Overall Tour of Luxembourg

1st Stage 3

1974
5th Overall Critérium National de la Route
8th Overall Tour de l'Aude
8th Circuit des Frontières
9th Bordeaux–Paris
1975
3rd Circuit des Frontières
10th Overall Paris–Nice
1977
9th Circuit de l'Indre

=== Grand Tour general classification results timeline ===
Grand Tour	1970	1971	1972	1973	1974	1975	1976
Vuelta a España	52	64	—	DNF	27	—	—
Giro d'Italia	Did not Contest during Career						
Tour de France	95	—	35	53	51	44	60

Legend
—	Did not compete
DNF	Did not finish
DSQ	Disqualified
