= Pierre Ghisellini =

French cyclist (born 1943)

Personal information
- Born: 15 October 1943 (age 83)

Cycling career
- Sport: Cycling
- Role: Rider

Pierre Ghisellini (born 15 October 1943) is a French racing cyclist. He rode in the 1970 Tour de France.
