= Cees Rentmeester =

Dutch cyclist

Personal information
- Born: 27 January 1947 (age 79)

Cycling career
- Sport: Cycling
- Role: Rider

Cees Rentmeester (born 27 January 1947) is a Dutch racing cyclist. He rode in the 1970 Tour de France.
