= Luis Zubero =

Spanish cyclist (1948–2025)

Personal information
- Born: 18 March 1948 Ceberio, Spain
- Died: 30 October 2025 (aged 77)

Cycling career
- Sport: Cycling
- Discipline: Road
- Role: Rider

Professional teams
- 1968–1974: Kas–Kaskol
- 1975: Monteverde–Sanson

Luis Zubero Aldecoa (18 March 1948 – 30 October 2025) was a Spanish cyclist. He competed in the individual road race at the 1968 Summer Olympics. He also rode in four editions of the Tour de France, three of the Giro d'Italia and one Vuelta a España, with his best result being 15th overall in the 1970 Tour de France. Zubero died on 30 October 2025, at the age of 77.

== Major results ==
1969
2nd Overall Tour de l'Avenir
1970
1st GP Pascuas
1st Clasica de Sabiñánigo
3rd GP Navarra
5th Overall Volta a Catalunya
9th Overall Setmana Catalana de Ciclisme
1973
5th Trofeo Masferrer
