= Cees Zoontjens =

Dutch cyclist (1944–2011)

Personal information
- Born: 10 August 1944 Tilburg, Netherlands
- Died: 28 April 2011 (aged 66) Tilburg, Netherlands

Cycling career
- Sport: Cycling
- Role: Rider

Cees Zoontjens (10 August 1944 – 28 April 2011) was a Dutch racing cyclist. He rode in the 1970 Tour de France.
