= Joseph Bruyère =

Belgian cyclist

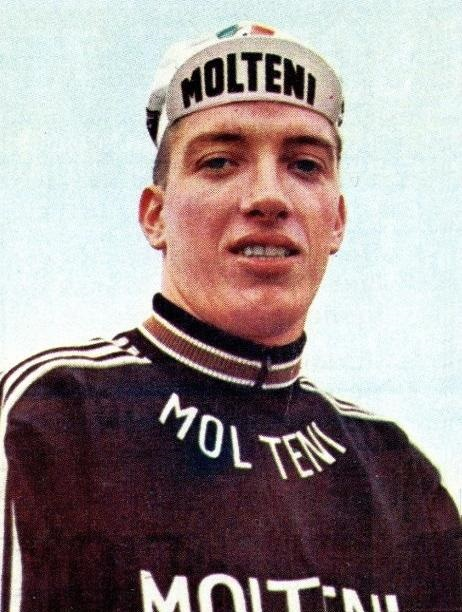
- Joseph Bruyère in 1971

Personal information
- Full name: Joseph Bruyère
- Born: 5 October 1948 (age 78) Maastricht, the Netherlands

Cycling career
- Sport: Cycling
- Discipline: Road
- Role: Rider

Professional teams
- 1970: Faemino–Faema
- 1971-1976: Molteni
- 1977: Fiat France
- 1978: C&A
- 1979: Flandria-Ça va seul-Sunair
- 1980: Marc-Carlos-VRD-Woningbouw

Major wins
- Grand Tours Tour de France 1 individual stage (1972) Giro d'Italia 1 individual stage (1976) Other stage races Tour Méditerranéen (1975) One-day races and Classics Liège–Bastogne–Liège (1976, 1978) Omloop Het Volk (1974, 1975 1980)

Joseph Bruyere or Bruyère (born 5 October 1948 in Maastricht, Netherlands) is a former Belgian cyclist.

== Career ==
Professional from 1970 to 1980, Joseph Bruyère, athlete of one meter 88 for 80 kilo, notably won Liège-Bastogne-Liège twice and an individual stage of the Tour de France 1972.

He is one of the specialists of the classic Het Volk, which he won in 1974, 1975 and 1980 (a shared record) and of Liège-Bastogne-Liège which he won in 1976 and 1978.

Bruyère participated in six Tours de France and achieved a victory in 1972 in the 19th stage between Auxerre and Versailles. He wore the yellow jersey twice, in 1974 for three days and in 1978 for eight days. On the 1978 edition, he finished fourth in the general classification, despite a size that was not well suited to the mountains.

From the start of his professional career, he was part of Eddy Merckx's team, until the latter retired from sport.

=== Teammate of Eddy Merckx ===
Bruyère rode several seasons as the lieutenant of the super-star rider Eddy Merckx. He was known to ride on the front of the peloton for many miles, and often for much of a mountain stage until the last climb, doing the work of a whole team of domestiques.

After Merckx retired from racing Bruyère tried to take over from Merckx as a big star, but he wasn't able to, having given his best years to the service of Merckx.

== Major results ==
=== As amateur ===
1968
1st stage 4 Tour de Namur
3rd National Track Championship - Men's individual pursuit
1969
1st Flèche Ardennaise
1st Championship of the Liège province
1st Romsée-Stavelot-Romsée
1st Seraing-Aix-Seraing

=== As professional ===
1970
1st Stage 3a Tour de France (TTT)
2nd Trophée des Grimpeurs
2nd Tour du Condroz
2nd Flèche Hesbignonne
1971
1st Prologue Tour de France (TTT)
1st Ronde van Oost-Vlaanderen
1st Prologue Critérium du Dauphiné Libéré (TTT)
2nd Overall Tour de la Nouvelle France
5th Milan-San Remo
7th Liège-Bastogne-Liège
1972
Tour de France

1st Stage 3b (TTT) & 19

1st Overall Cronostaffetta

1st Stage 1b (ITT)

1st Flèche rebecquoise
3rd Leiedal Koerse
1973
1st Stage 3b (TTT) Vuelta a España
1st Overall Cronostaffetta

1st Stage 1c (ITT)

3rd Grand Prix de Fourmies
1974
Tour de France

1st Stage 6b (TTT)
Held for 3 days

1st Omloop Het Volk
1st Prologue Paris–Nice (with Eddy Merckx)
2nd GP Union Dortmund
3rd Classica Sarda
1975
1st Overall Tour Méditerranéen
1st Omloop Het Volk
1st stage 1 Setmana Catalana de Ciclisme
3rd Amstel Gold Race
5th Milan-San Remo
8th Paris–Nice
1976
1st Liège–Bastogne–Liège
1st Prologue Tour de Romandie (with Eddy Merckx)
1t Stage 22 Giro d'Italia (ITT)
1st Druivenkoers Overijse
1977
2nd Overall Setmana Catalana de Ciclisme

1st stage 1 Setmana Catalana de Ciclisme

1st Stage 7b Tour de France (TTT)
2nd Belgian National Road Race Championships - Road Race
3rd Tour du Condroz
5th Paris–Nice
10th Liège–Bastogne–Liège
1978
4th Overall Tour de France

Held for 8 days

1st Liège–Bastogne–Liège
1st Tour du Condroz
2nd Overall La Méditerranéenne
10th La Flèche Wallonne
1980
1st Omloop Het Volk

== Tour de France ==
- 1970 - 50th
- 1971 - 60th
- 1972 - 26th; winner of 19th stage
- 1974 - 21st (4 days in the yellow jersey)
- 1978 - 4th (8 days in the yellow jersey)
