= Harry Steevens =

Dutch cyclist

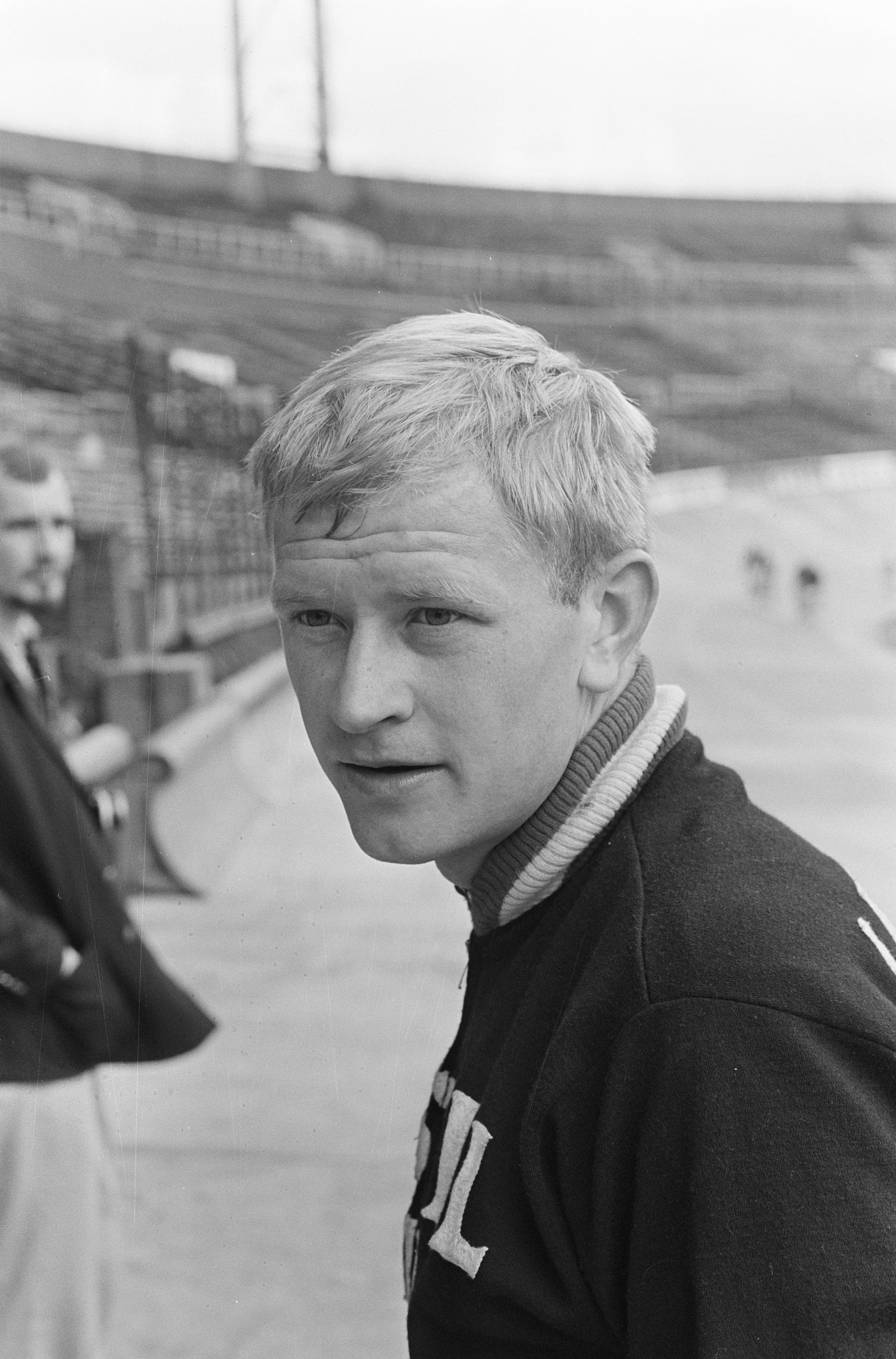
- Harry Steevens in 1966

Personal information
- Born: 27 April 1945 (age 81) Elsloo, Netherlands
- Height: 1.78 m (5 ft 10 in)
- Weight: 73 kg (161 lb)

Sport
- Sport: Cycling
Medal record
Representing the Netherlands
UCI Road World Championships
Silver medal – second place	1966 Nürburgring	Team time trial

Henri "Harry" Steevens (born 27 April 1945) is a retired Dutch cyclist who was active between 1960 and 1972. He competed at the 1964 Summer Olympics in the individual road race and finished in 40th place. Two years later he won a silver medal in the team time trial at the 1966 UCI Road World Championships. He also won the Olympia's Tour (1965), Ronde van Limburg (1966) and Amstel Gold Race (1968), as well as individual stages of the Olympia's Tour (1964, 1965, 1966), Vuelta a Andalucía (1968) and Tour de Suisse (1970).

His brother Henk Steevens was also a cyclist.

== See also ==
- List of Dutch Olympic cyclists
