= List of teams and cyclists in the 1970 Tour de France =

List of cyclists

After his dominating victory in the previous year, Merckx was the major favourite for the 1970 Tour de France. The main competition was expected from Luis Ocaña and Bernard Thévenet. Early in the race, 86 journalists predicted who would be in the top five of the Tour. 85 of them expected Merckx to be in the top five; Ocana was named by 78, Poulidor by 73. Merckx had already won important races in 1970, including Paris–Roubaix, Paris–Nice, the Giro d'Italia and the Belgian national road championship. Luis Ocaña, who had won the Critérium du Dauphiné Libéré and the Vuelta a España, suffered from bronchitis, but still started the Tour, unable to seriously challenge Merckx.

The Tour de France started with 15 teams, of 10 cyclists each, from five countries:

French

- Bic
- Fagor–Mercier
- Frimatic–de Gribaldy–Viva–Wolber
- Peugeot–BP
- Sonolor–Lejeune–Wolber

Italian

- Salvarani
- Molteni
- Scic
- Ferretti

Belgian

- Faema–Faemino
- Mars–Flandria
- Mann–Grundig

Dutch

- Caballero–Laurens
- Willem II–Gazelle

Spanish

- KAS–Kaskol

A few days before the Tour started, it became known that Paul Gutty had failed a doping test when he won the French national road championship. Gutty was removed from his Frimatic team, and replaced by Rene Grelin.

== Start list ==
=== By team ===
Faema–Faemino
No.	Rider	Pos.
1	Eddy Merckx (BEL)	1
2	Etienne Antheunis (BEL)	87
3	Joseph Bruyère (BEL)	50
4	Jos Huysmans (BEL)	30
5	Frans Mintjens (BEL)	75
6	Jozef Spruyt (BEL)	46
7	Roger Swerts (BEL)	24
8	Georges Vandenberghe (BEL)	DNF
9	Victor Van Schil (BEL)	68
10	Italo Zilioli (ITA)	13

Peugeot–BP–Michelin
No.	Rider	Pos.
11	Robert Bouloux (FRA)	41
12	Jean-Pierre Danguillaume (FRA)	64
13	Raymond Delisle (FRA)	11
14	Jean Dumont (FRA)	21
15	Désiré Letort (FRA)	DNF
16	Pierre Martelozzo (FRA)	76
17	Jean-Pierre Paranteau (FRA)	58
18	Roger Pingeon (FRA)	DNF
19	Christian Raymond (FRA)	52
20	Bernard Thévenet (FRA)	35

Fagor–Mercier–Hutchinson
No.	Rider	Pos.
21	Georges Chappe (FRA)	84
22	Jean-Pierre Genet (FRA)	82
23	Cyrille Guimard (FRA)	62
24	Bernard Labourdette (FRA)	33
25	Eddy Peelman (BEL)	DNF
26	Michel Périn (FRA)	79
27	Domingo Perurena (ESP)	90
28	Raymond Poulidor (FRA)	7
29	Henri Rabaute (FRA)	27
30	Rolf Wolfshohl (FRG)	37

Salvarani
No.	Rider	Pos.
31	Franco Balmamion (ITA)	12
32	Cipriano Chemello (ITA)	DNF
33	Luciano Dalla Bona (ITA)	96
34	Walter Godefroot (BEL)	29
35	Pietro Guerra (ITA)	71
36	Tony Houbrechts (BEL)	8
37	Vittorio Marcelli (ITA)	DNF
38	Primo Mori (ITA)	28
39	Wladimiro Panizza (ITA)	18
40	Silvano Schiavon (ITA)	DNF

KAS–Kaskol
No.	Rider	Pos.
41	Francisco Gabica (ESP)	23
42	Francisco Galdós (ESP)	9
43	Andrés Gandarias (ESP)	20
44	Aurelio González Puente (ESP)	25
45	José Antonio González (ESP)	56
46	Nemesio Jiménez (ESP)	74
47	Vicente López Carril (ESP)	34
48	Gabriel Mascaró Febrer (ESP)	66
49	José Luis Uribezubia (ESP)	DNF
50	Luis Zubero (ESP)	15

Willem II–Gazelle
No.	Rider	Pos.
51	Evert Dolman (NED)	32
52	Frits Hoogerheide (NED)	100
53	Victor Nuelant (BEL)	DNF
54	Harm Ottenbros (NED)	78
55	René Pijnen (NED)	DNF
56	Edward Sels (BEL)	DNF
57	Jan Serpenti (NED)	DNF
58	Jos van der Vleuten (NED)	44
59	Jan van Katwijk (NED)	80
60	Marinus Wagtmans (NED)	5

Molteni
No.	Rider	Pos.
61	Mario Anni (ITA)	55
62	Marino Basso (ITA)	63
63	Davide Boifava (ITA)	DNF
64	Carlo Chiappano (ITA)	DNF
65	Franco Mori (ITA)	53
66	Arturo Pecchielan (ITA)	DNF
67	Giacinto Santambrogio (ITA)	49
68	Edy Schütz (LUX)	38
69	Guerrino Tosello (ITA)	39
70	Martin Van Den Bossche (BEL)	4

Frimatic–de Gribaldy–Viva–Wolber
No.	Rider	Pos.
71	Joaquim Agostinho (POR)	14
72	Régis Delépine (FRA)	DNF
73	Mogens Frey (DEN)	59
74	Pierre Gautier (FRA)	42
75	Pierre Ghisellini (FRA)	97
76	Michel Grain (FRA)	DNF
77	René Grelin (FRA)	DNF
78	Maurice Izier (FRA)	61
79	Jean Vidament (FRA)	DNF
80	Bernard Vifian (SUI)	22

Bic
No.	Rider	Pos.
81	Roland Berland (FRA)	77
82	Jean-Claude Genty (FRA)	DNF
83	Charly Grosskost (FRA)	DNF
84	Jan Janssen (NED)	26
85	Jean-Marie Leblanc (FRA)	83
86	Anatole Novak (FRA)	DNF
87	Luis Ocaña (ESP)	31
88	Johny Schleck (LUX)	19
89	Alain Vasseur (FRA)	40
90	Sylvain Vasseur (FRA)	95

Sonolor–Lejeune–Wolber
No.	Rider	Pos.
91	Stéphane Abrahamian (FRA)	DNF
92	Lucien Aimar (FRA)	17
93	Gilbert Bellone (FRA)	DNF
94	José Catieau (FRA)	70
95	Bernard Guyot (FRA)	DNF
96	Barry Hoban (GBR)	DNF
97	Walter Ricci (FRA)	51
98	Raymond Riotte (FRA)	72
99	Jean-Claude Theillière (FRA)	DNF
100	Lucien Van Impe (BEL)	6

Mann–Grundig
No.	Rider	Pos.
101	René De Bie (BEL)	94
102	Jos Deschoenmaecker (BEL)	57
103	Ronald De Witte (BEL)	43
104	Willy In ’t Ven (BEL)	89
105	Georges Pintens (BEL)	10
106	André Poppe (BEL)	54
107	Eddy Reyniers (BEL)	65
108	Willy Van Neste (BEL)	16
109	Daniel Van Ryckeghem (BEL)	67
110	Herman Van Springel (BEL)	DNF

Mars–Flandria
No.	Rider	Pos.
111	Eddy Beugels (NED)	81
112	Michel Coulon (BEL)	85
113	Gérard David (BEL)	69
114	Jaak De Boever (BEL)	98
115	Erik De Vlaeminck (BEL)	DNF
116	Roger De Vlaeminck (BEL)	DNF
117	Eric Leman (BEL)	DNF
118	Marc Lievens (BEL)	91
119	Pieter Nassen (BEL)	88
120	Joop Zoetemelk (NED)	2

Caballero–Laurens
No.	Rider	Pos.
121	Henk Benjamins (NED)	DNF
122	Arie den Hartog (NED)	DNF
123	Leo Duyndam (NED)	DNF
124	Huub Harings (NED)	DNF
125	Cees Rentmeester (NED)	92
126	Wim Schepers (NED)	DNF
127	Harry Steevens (NED)	45
128	Gerard Vianen (NED)	47
129	Adri Wouters (NED)	DNF
130	Cees Zoontjens (NED)	86

Ferretti
No.	Rider	Pos.
131	Giuseppe Beghetto (ITA)	DNF
132	Eraldo Bocci (ITA)	DNF
133	Franco Cortinovis (ITA)	DNF
134	Gösta Pettersson (SWE)	3
135	Tomas Pettersson (SWE)	36
136	Renato Rota (ITA)	DNF
137	Pietro Tamiazzo (ITA)	DNF
138	Romano Tumellero (ITA)	93
139	Albert Van Vlierberghe (BEL)	48
140	Loris Vignolini (ITA)	DNF

Scic
No.	Rider	Pos.
141	Luciano Armani (ITA)	DNF
142	Attilio Benfatto (ITA)	60
143	Constantino Conti (ITA)	DNF
144	Adriano Durante (ITA)	99
145	Ernesto Jotti (ITA)	DNF
146	Claudio Michelotto (ITA)	DNF
147	Enrico Paolini (ITA)	DNF
148	Giancarlo Polidori (ITA)	73
149	Ambrogio Portalupi (ITA)	DNF
150	Paolo Zini (ITA)	DNF

=== By rider ===
Legend
No.	Starting number worn by the rider during the Tour
Pos.	Position in the general classification
DNF	Denotes a rider who did not finish

No.	Name	Nationality	Team	Pos.	Ref
1	Eddy Merckx	Belgium	Faema–Faemino	1	
2	Etienne Antheunis	Belgium	Faema–Faemino	87	
3	Joseph Bruyère	Belgium	Faema–Faemino	50	
4	Jos Huysmans	Belgium	Faema–Faemino	30	
5	Frans Mintjens	Belgium	Faema–Faemino	75	
6	Jozef Spruyt	Belgium	Faema–Faemino	46	
7	Roger Swerts	Belgium	Faema–Faemino	24	
8	Georges Vandenberghe	Belgium	Faema–Faemino	DNF	
9	Victor Van Schil	Belgium	Faema–Faemino	68	
10	Italo Zilioli	Italy	Faema–Faemino	13	
11	Robert Bouloux	France	Peugeot–BP–Michelin	41	
12	Jean-Pierre Danguillaume	France	Peugeot–BP–Michelin	64	
13	Raymond Delisle	France	Peugeot–BP–Michelin	11	
14	Jean Dumont	France	Peugeot–BP–Michelin	21	
15	Désiré Letort	France	Peugeot–BP–Michelin	DNF	
16	Pierre Martelozzo	France	Peugeot–BP–Michelin	76	
17	Jean-Pierre Paranteau	France	Peugeot–BP–Michelin	58	
18	Roger Pingeon	France	Peugeot–BP–Michelin	DNF	
19	Christian Raymond	France	Peugeot–BP–Michelin	52	
20	Bernard Thévenet	France	Peugeot–BP–Michelin	35	
21	Georges Chappe	France	Fagor–Mercier–Hutchinson	84	
22	Jean-Pierre Genet	France	Fagor–Mercier–Hutchinson	82	
23	Cyrille Guimard	France	Fagor–Mercier–Hutchinson	62	
24	Bernard Labourdette	France	Fagor–Mercier–Hutchinson	33	
25	Eddy Peelman	Belgium	Fagor–Mercier–Hutchinson	DNF	
26	Michel Périn	France	Fagor–Mercier–Hutchinson	79	
27	Domingo Perurena	Spain	Fagor–Mercier–Hutchinson	90	
28	Raymond Poulidor	France	Fagor–Mercier–Hutchinson	7	
29	Henri Rabaute	France	Fagor–Mercier–Hutchinson	27	
30	Rolf Wolfshohl	West Germany	Fagor–Mercier–Hutchinson	37	
31	Franco Balmamion	Italy	Salvarani	12	
32	Cipriano Chemello	Italy	Salvarani	DNF	
33	Luciano Dalla Bona	Italy	Salvarani	96	
34	Walter Godefroot	Belgium	Salvarani	29	
35	Pietro Guerra	Italy	Salvarani	71	
36	Tony Houbrechts	Belgium	Salvarani	8	
37	Vittorio Marcelli	Italy	Salvarani	DNF	
38	Primo Mori	Italy	Salvarani	28	
39	Wladimiro Panizza	Italy	Salvarani	18	
40	Silvano Schiavon	Italy	Salvarani	DNF	
41	Francisco Gabica	Spain	KAS–Kaskol	23	
42	Francisco Galdós	Spain	KAS–Kaskol	9	
43	Andrés Gandarias	Spain	KAS–Kaskol	20	
44	Aurelio González Puente	Spain	KAS–Kaskol	25	
45	José Antonio González	Spain	KAS–Kaskol	56	
46	Nemesio Jiménez	Spain	KAS–Kaskol	74	
47	Vicente López Carril	Spain	KAS–Kaskol	34	
48	Gabriel Mascaró Febrer	Spain	KAS–Kaskol	66	
49	José Luis Uribezubia	Spain	KAS–Kaskol	DNF	
50	Luis Zubero	Spain	KAS–Kaskol	15	
51	Evert Dolman	Netherlands	Willem II–Gazelle	32	
52	Frits Hoogerheide	Netherlands	Willem II–Gazelle	100	
53	Victor Nuelant	Belgium	Willem II–Gazelle	DNF	
54	Harm Ottenbros	Netherlands	Willem II–Gazelle	78	
55	René Pijnen	Netherlands	Willem II–Gazelle	DNF	
56	Edward Sels	Belgium	Willem II–Gazelle	DNF	
57	Jan Serpenti	Netherlands	Willem II–Gazelle	DNF	
58	Jos van der Vleuten	Netherlands	Willem II–Gazelle	44	
59	Jan van Katwijk	Netherlands	Willem II–Gazelle	80	
60	Marinus Wagtmans	Netherlands	Willem II–Gazelle	5	
61	Mario Anni	Italy	Molteni	55	
62	Marino Basso	Italy	Molteni	63	
63	Davide Boifava	Italy	Molteni	DNF	
64	Carlo Chiappano	Italy	Molteni	DNF	
65	Franco Mori	Italy	Molteni	53	
66	Arturo Pecchielan	Italy	Molteni	DNF	
67	Giacinto Santambrogio	Italy	Molteni	49	
68	Edy Schütz	Luxembourg	Molteni	38	
69	Guerrino Tosello	Italy	Molteni	39	
70	Martin Van Den Bossche	Belgium	Molteni	4	
71	Joaquim Agostinho	Portugal	Frimatic–de Gribaldy–Viva–Wolber	14	
72	Régis Delépine	France	Frimatic–de Gribaldy–Viva–Wolber	DNF	
73	Mogens Frey	Denmark	Frimatic–de Gribaldy–Viva–Wolber	59	
74	Pierre Gautier	France	Frimatic–de Gribaldy–Viva–Wolber	42	
75	Pierre Ghisellini	France	Frimatic–de Gribaldy–Viva–Wolber	97	
76	Michel Grain	France	Frimatic–de Gribaldy–Viva–Wolber	DNF	
77	René Grelin	France	Frimatic–de Gribaldy–Viva–Wolber	DNF	
78	Maurice Izier	France	Frimatic–de Gribaldy–Viva–Wolber	61	
79	Jean Vidament	France	Frimatic–de Gribaldy–Viva–Wolber	DNF	
80	Bernard Vifian	Switzerland	Frimatic–de Gribaldy–Viva–Wolber	22	
81	Roland Berland	France	Bic	77	
82	Jean-Claude Genty	France	Bic	DNF	
83	Charly Grosskost	France	Bic	DNF	
84	Jan Janssen	Netherlands	Bic	26	
85	Jean-Marie Leblanc	France	Bic	83	
86	Anatole Novak	France	Bic	DNF	
87	Luis Ocaña	Spain	Bic	31	
88	Johny Schleck	Luxembourg	Bic	19	
89	Alain Vasseur	France	Bic	40	
90	Sylvain Vasseur	France	Bic	95	
91	Stéphane Abrahamian	France	Sonolor–Lejeune–Wolber	DNF	
92	Lucien Aimar	France	Sonolor–Lejeune–Wolber	17	
93	Gilbert Bellone	France	Sonolor–Lejeune–Wolber	DNF	
94	José Catieau	France	Sonolor–Lejeune–Wolber	70	
95	Bernard Guyot	France	Sonolor–Lejeune–Wolber	DNF	
96	Barry Hoban	Great Britain	Sonolor–Lejeune–Wolber	DNF	
97	Walter Ricci	France	Sonolor–Lejeune–Wolber	51	
98	Raymond Riotte	France	Sonolor–Lejeune–Wolber	72	
99	Jean-Claude Theillière	France	Sonolor–Lejeune–Wolber	DNF	
100	Lucien Van Impe	Belgium	Sonolor–Lejeune–Wolber	6	
101	René De Bie	Belgium	Mann–Grundig	94	
102	Jos Deschoenmaecker	Belgium	Mann–Grundig	57	
103	Ronald De Witte	Belgium	Mann–Grundig	43	
104	Willy In ’t Ven	Belgium	Mann–Grundig	89	
105	Georges Pintens	Belgium	Mann–Grundig	10	
106	André Poppe	Belgium	Mann–Grundig	54	
107	Eddy Reyniers	Belgium	Mann–Grundig	65	
108	Willy Van Neste	Belgium	Mann–Grundig	16	
109	Daniel Van Ryckeghem	Belgium	Mann–Grundig	67	
110	Herman Van Springel	Belgium	Mann–Grundig	DNF	
111	Eddy Beugels	Netherlands	Mars–Flandria	81	
112	Michel Coulon	Belgium	Mars–Flandria	85	
113	Gérard David	Belgium	Mars–Flandria	69	
114	Jaak De Boever	Belgium	Mars–Flandria	98	
115	Erik De Vlaeminck	Belgium	Mars–Flandria	DNF	
116	Roger De Vlaeminck	Belgium	Mars–Flandria	DNF	
117	Eric Leman	Belgium	Mars–Flandria	DNF	
118	Marc Lievens	Belgium	Mars–Flandria	91	
119	Pieter Nassen	Belgium	Mars–Flandria	88	
120	Joop Zoetemelk	Netherlands	Mars–Flandria	2	
121	Henk Benjamins	Netherlands	Caballero–Laurens	DNF	
122	Arie den Hartog	Netherlands	Caballero–Laurens	DNF	
123	Leo Duyndam	Netherlands	Caballero–Laurens	DNF	
124	Huub Harings	Netherlands	Caballero–Laurens	DNF	
125	Cees Rentmeester	Netherlands	Caballero–Laurens	92	
126	Wim Schepers	Netherlands	Caballero–Laurens	DNF	
127	Harry Steevens	Netherlands	Caballero–Laurens	45	
128	Gerard Vianen	Netherlands	Caballero–Laurens	47	
129	Adrie Wouters	Netherlands	Caballero–Laurens	DNF	
130	Cees Zoontjens	Netherlands	Caballero–Laurens	86	
131	Giuseppe Beghetto	Italy	Ferretti	DNF	
132	Eraldo Bocci	Italy	Ferretti	DNF	
133	Franco Cortinovis	Italy	Ferretti	DNF	
134	Gösta Pettersson	Sweden	Ferretti	3	
135	Tomas Pettersson	Sweden	Ferretti	36	
136	Renato Rota	Italy	Ferretti	DNF	
137	Pietro Tamiazzo	Italy	Ferretti	DNF	
138	Romano Tumellero	Italy	Ferretti	93	
139	Albert Van Vlierberghe	Belgium	Ferretti	48	
140	Loris Vignolini	Italy	Ferretti	DNF	
141	Luciano Armani	Italy	Scic	DNF	
142	Attilio Benfatto	Italy	Scic	60	
143	Constantino Conti	Italy	Scic	DNF	
144	Adriano Durante	Italy	Scic	99	
145	Ernesto Jotti	Italy	Scic	DNF	
146	Claudio Michelotto	Italy	Scic	DNF	
147	Enrico Paolini	Italy	Scic	DNF	
148	Giancarlo Polidori	Italy	Scic	73	
149	Ambrogio Portalupi	Italy	Scic	DNF	
150	Paolo Zini	Italy	Scic	DNF	
