= 1971 Vuelta a España, Prologue to Stage 9 =

Cycling race stages

The 1971 Vuelta a España was the 26th edition of the Vuelta a España, one of cycling's Grand Tours. The Vuelta began in Almería, with a prologue individual time trial on 29 April, and Stage 9 occurred on 8 May with a stage to Pamplona. The race finished in Madrid on 16 May.

== Prologue ==
29 April 1971 - Almería to Almería, 4.2 km (2.6 mi) (ITT)

Prologue result and general classification after Prologue

Rank	Rider	Team	Time
1	René Pijnen (NED)	Bic	5' 22.2"
2	José Antonio González (ESP)	Kas–Kaskol	+ 6"
3	Luis Ocaña (ESP)	Bic	+ 8"
4	Ferdinand Bracke (BEL)	Peugeot–BP–Michelin	s.t.
5	José Manuel López (ESP)	Werner	+ 10"
6	Juan Manuel Santisteban (ESP)	Karpy	+ 11"
7	José Pesarrodona (ESP)	Kas–Kaskol	+ 13"
8	José Gómez (ESP)	Werner	s.t.
9	Domingo Perurena (ESP)	Kas–Kaskol	s.t.
10	Raymond Poulidor (FRA)	Fagor–Mercier–Hutchinson	+ 14"

== Stage 1 ==
30 April 1971 - Almería to Águilas, 126 km (78.3 mi)

Route:

Stage 1 result

Rank	Rider	Team	Time
1	Ger Harings (NED)	Goudsmit–Hoff	2h 57' 30"
2	Eddy Peelman (BEL)	Fagor–Mercier–Hutchinson	+ 10"
3	Willy Planckaert (BEL)	Goldor	+ 16"
4	Walter Godefroot (BEL)	Peugeot–BP–Michelin	s.t.
5	Ramón Sáez Marzo (ESP)	Werner	s.t.
6	Miguel María Lasa (ESP)	Orbea–Legnano	s.t.
7	Roger Rosiers (BEL)	Bic	s.t.
8	Gerben Karstens (NED)	Goudsmit–Hoff	s.t.
9	Jan van Katwijk (NED)	Goudsmit–Hoff	s.t.
10	Cyrille Guimard (FRA)	Fagor–Mercier–Hutchinson	s.t.

General classification after Stage 1

Rank	Rider	Team	Time
1	René Pijnen (NED)	Bic	3h 03' 13"
2	José Antonio González (ESP)	Kas–Kaskol	+ 6"
3	Luis Ocaña (ESP)	Bic	s.t.
4	Ferdinand Bracke (BEL)	Peugeot–BP–Michelin	s.t.
5	Ramón Sáez Marzo (ESP)	Werner	+ 9"
6	José Manuel López (ESP)	Werner	+ 10"
7	Juan Manuel Santisteban (ESP)	Karpy	+ 11"
8	José Pesarrodona (ESP)	Kas–Kaskol	+ 12"
9	Domingo Perurena (ESP)	Kas–Kaskol	+ 13"
10	José Gómez (ESP)	Werner	s.t.

== Stage 2 ==
1 May 1971 - Águilas to Calp, 245 km (152.2 mi)

Route:

Stage 2 result

Rank	Rider	Team	Time
1	Eddy Peelman (BEL)	Fagor–Mercier–Hutchinson	6h 12' 04"
2	Miguel María Lasa (ESP)	Orbea–Legnano	+ 10"
3	Walter Godefroot (BEL)	Peugeot–BP–Michelin	+ 16"
4	Ger Harings (NED)	Goudsmit–Hoff	+ 20"
5	Cyrille Guimard (FRA)	Fagor–Mercier–Hutchinson	s.t.
6	Willy Planckaert (BEL)	Goldor	s.t.
7	Roger Rosiers (BEL)	Bic	s.t.
8	Harry Steevens (NED)	Goudsmit–Hoff	s.t.
9	Demetrio Martí Luján (ESP)	Orbea–Legnano	s.t.
10	Marc Sohet (BEL)	Bic	s.t.

General classification after Stage 2

Rank	Rider	Team	Time
1	René Pijnen (NED)	Bic	9h 15' 37"
2	Domingo Perurena (ESP)	Kas–Kaskol	+ 3"
3	Miguel María Lasa (ESP)	Orbea–Legnano	+ 4"
4	José Antonio González (ESP)	Kas–Kaskol	+ 6"
5	Luis Ocaña (ESP)	Bic	+ 8"
6	Ferdinand Bracke (BEL)	Peugeot–BP–Michelin	s.t.
7	Ramón Sáez Marzo (ESP)	Werner	+ 9"
8	José Manuel López (ESP)	Werner	+ 10"
9	Joop Zoetemelk (NED)	Flandria–Mars	+ 12"
10	Eddy Peelman (BEL)	Fagor–Mercier–Hutchinson	s.t.

== Stage 3 ==
2 May 1971 - Calp to La Pobla de Farnals, 164 km (102 mi)

Route:

Stage 3 result

Rank	Rider	Team	Time
1	Cyrille Guimard (FRA)	Fagor–Mercier–Hutchinson	4h 11' 32"
2	Evert Dolman (NED)	Flandria–Mars	+ 10"
3	Harry Steevens (NED)	Goudsmit–Hoff	+ 14"
4	Miguel María Lasa (ESP)	Orbea–Legnano	+ 20"
5	Jean-Pierre Danguillaume (FRA)	Peugeot–BP–Michelin	s.t.
6	Jan Krekels (NED)	Goudsmit–Hoff	s.t.
7	Wim Schepers (NED)	Goudsmit–Hoff	s.t.
8	José Manuel López (ESP)	Werner	s.t.
9	Eddy Peelman (BEL)	Fagor–Mercier–Hutchinson	s.t.
10	Karl-Heinz Muddemann (FRG)	Flandria–Mars	s.t.

General classification after Stage 3

Rank	Rider	Team	Time
1	René Pijnen (NED)	Bic	13h 37' 24"
2	Domingo Perurena (ESP)	Kas–Kaskol	+ 1"
3	Miguel María Lasa (ESP)	Orbea–Legnano	+ 9"
4	Cyrille Guimard (FRA)	Fagor–Mercier–Hutchinson	s.t.
5	José Antonio González (ESP)	Kas–Kaskol	+ 11"
6	Luis Ocaña (ESP)	Bic	+ 13"
7	Ferdinand Bracke (BEL)	Peugeot–BP–Michelin	s.t.
8	Ramón Sáez Marzo (ESP)	Werner	+ 14"
9	Evert Dolman (NED)	Flandria–Mars	+ 17"
10	Eddy Peelman (BEL)	Fagor–Mercier–Hutchinson	s.t.

== Stage 4 ==
3 May 1971 - La Pobla de Farnals to Benicàssim, 175 km (109 mi)

Route:

Stage 4 result

Rank	Rider	Team	Time
1	Hubert Hutsebaut (BEL)	Goldor	4h 45' 00"
2	Cyrille Guimard (FRA)	Fagor–Mercier–Hutchinson	+ 10"
3	Julián Cuevas González (ESP)	Karpy	+ 16"
4	Gerard Vianen (NED)	Fagor–Mercier–Hutchinson	+ 20"
5	Gérard Besnard (FRA)	Peugeot–BP–Michelin	s.t.
6	José Grande Sánchez (ESP)	Werner	s.t.
7	Manuel Galera Magdelano (ESP)	Karpy	s.t.
8	Sylvain Vasseur (FRA)	Bic	s.t.
9	Francisco Gabica (ESP)	Kas–Kaskol	+ 22"
10	Gerben Karstens (NED)	Goudsmit–Hoff	+ 24"

== Stage 5 ==
4 May 1971 - Benicàssim to Salou, 172 km (107 mi)

Route:

Stage 5 result

Rank	Rider	Team	Time
1	René Pijnen (NED)	Bic	3h 45' 30"
2	Jean-Pierre Paranteau (FRA)	Peugeot–BP–Michelin	+ 10"
3	Eduardo Castelló (ESP)	Karpy	s.t.
4	Walter Godefroot (BEL)	Peugeot–BP–Michelin	+ 21"
5	Jan Krekels (NED)	Goudsmit–Hoff	s.t.
6	Gerben Karstens (NED)	Goudsmit–Hoff	s.t.
7	Cyrille Guimard (FRA)	Fagor–Mercier–Hutchinson	s.t.
8	Karl-Heinz Muddemann (FRG)	Flandria–Mars	s.t.
9	Roger Loysch (BEL)	Flandria–Mars	s.t.
10	José Gómez (ESP)	Werner	s.t.

General classification after Stage 5

Rank	Rider	Team	Time
1	René Pijnen (NED)	Bic	21h 58' 18"
2	Eduardo Castelló (ESP)	Karpy	+ 46"
3	Jean-Pierre Paranteau (FRA)	Peugeot–BP–Michelin	+ 1' 02"
4	Cyrille Guimard (FRA)	Fagor–Mercier–Hutchinson	+ 1' 11"
5	Domingo Perurena (ESP)	Kas–Kaskol	+ 1' 16"
6	Miguel María Lasa (ESP)	Orbea–Legnano	+ 1' 30"
7	José Antonio González (ESP)	Kas–Kaskol	+ 1' 32"
8	Ferdinand Bracke (BEL)	Peugeot–BP–Michelin	+ 1' 34"
9	Luis Ocaña (ESP)	Bic	s.t.
10	Ramón Sáez Marzo (ESP)	Werner	+ 1' 35"

== Stage 6 ==
5 May 1971 - Salou to Barcelona, 149 km (93 mi)

Route:

Stage 6 result

Rank	Rider	Team	Time
1	Eddy Peelman (BEL)	Fagor–Mercier–Hutchinson	3h 27' 49"
2	Cyrille Guimard (FRA)	Fagor–Mercier–Hutchinson	+ 10"
3	Walter Godefroot (BEL)	Peugeot–BP–Michelin	+ 16"
4	Gerben Karstens (NED)	Goudsmit–Hoff	+ 20"
5	Domingo Perurena (ESP)	Kas–Kaskol	s.t.
6	Ramón Sáez Marzo (ESP)	Werner	s.t.
7	Eric Raes (BEL)	Goldor	s.t.
8	Roger Loysch (BEL)	Flandria–Mars	s.t.
9	Désiré Letort (FRA)	Bic	s.t.
10	Karl-Heinz Muddemann (FRG)	Flandria–Mars	s.t.

General classification after Stage 6

Rank	Rider	Team	Time
1	René Pijnen (NED)	Bic	25h 26' 22"
2	Eduardo Castelló (ESP)	Karpy	+ 51"
3	Cyrille Guimard (FRA)	Fagor–Mercier–Hutchinson	+ 1' 01"
4	Jean-Pierre Paranteau (FRA)	Peugeot–BP–Michelin	+ 1' 07"
5	Domingo Perurena (ESP)	Kas–Kaskol	+ 1' 21"
6	Miguel María Lasa (ESP)	Orbea–Legnano	+ 1' 35"
7	José Antonio González (ESP)	Kas–Kaskol	+ 1' 37"
8	Ferdinand Bracke (BEL)	Peugeot–BP–Michelin	+ 1' 39"
9	Luis Ocaña (ESP)	Bic	s.t.
10	Ramón Sáez Marzo (ESP)	Werner	+ 1' 40"

== Stage 7 ==
6 May 1971 - Barcelona to Manresa, 179 km (111 mi)

Route:

Stage 7 result

Rank	Rider	Team	Time
1	Walter Godefroot (BEL)	Peugeot–BP–Michelin	5h 12' 59"
2	Cyrille Guimard (FRA)	Fagor–Mercier–Hutchinson	+ 10"
3	Domingo Perurena (ESP)	Kas–Kaskol	+ 16"
4	José Gómez (ESP)	Werner	+ 20"
5	Miguel María Lasa (ESP)	Orbea–Legnano	s.t.
6	Antonio Martos Aguilar (ESP)	Werner	s.t.
7	René Pijnen (NED)	Bic	s.t.
8	Evert Dolman (NED)	Flandria–Mars	s.t.
9	Wim Schepers (NED)	Goudsmit–Hoff	s.t.
10	Julián Cuevas González (ESP)	Karpy	s.t.

General classification after Stage 7

Rank	Rider	Team	Time
1	René Pijnen (NED)	Bic	30h 39' 41"
2	Cyrille Guimard (FRA)	Fagor–Mercier–Hutchinson	+ 51"
3	Eduardo Castelló (ESP)	Karpy	s.t.
4	Domingo Perurena (ESP)	Kas–Kaskol	+ 1' 17"
5	Walter Godefroot (BEL)	Peugeot–BP–Michelin	+ 1' 22"
6	Miguel María Lasa (ESP)	Orbea–Legnano	+ 1' 35"
7	Joop Zoetemelk (NED)	Flandria–Mars	s.t.
8	José Antonio González (ESP)	Kas–Kaskol	+ 1' 37"
9	Ferdinand Bracke (BEL)	Peugeot–BP–Michelin	+ 1' 39"
10	Luis Ocaña (ESP)	Bic	s.t.

== Stage 8 ==
7 May 1971 - Balaguer to Jaca, 211 km (131 mi)

Route:

Stage 8 result

Rank	Rider	Team	Time
1	Walter Godefroot (BEL)	Peugeot–BP–Michelin	5h 30' 45"
2	Cyrille Guimard (FRA)	Fagor–Mercier–Hutchinson	+ 10"
3	Domingo Perurena (ESP)	Kas–Kaskol	+ 16"
4	Julián Cuevas González (ESP)	Karpy	+ 20"
5	Miguel María Lasa (ESP)	Orbea–Legnano	s.t.
6	Gerben Karstens (NED)	Goudsmit–Hoff	s.t.
7	Jan Krekels (NED)	Goudsmit–Hoff	s.t.
8	René Pijnen (NED)	Bic	s.t.
9	Harry Steevens (NED)	Goudsmit–Hoff	s.t.
10	Evert Dolman (NED)	Flandria–Mars	s.t.

General classification after Stage 8

Rank	Rider	Team	Time
1	René Pijnen (NED)	Bic	38h 10' 46"
2	Cyrille Guimard (FRA)	Fagor–Mercier–Hutchinson	+ 41"
3	Eduardo Castelló (ESP)	Karpy	+ 51"
4	Walter Godefroot (BEL)	Peugeot–BP–Michelin	+ 1' 02"
5	Domingo Perurena (ESP)	Kas–Kaskol	+ 1' 13"
6	Miguel María Lasa (ESP)	Orbea–Legnano	+ 1' 35"
7	Joop Zoetemelk (NED)	Flandria–Mars	s.t.
8	José Antonio González (ESP)	Kas–Kaskol	+ 1' 37"
9	Ferdinand Bracke (BEL)	Peugeot–BP–Michelin	+ 1' 39"
10	Luis Ocaña (ESP)	Bic	s.t.

== Stage 9 ==
8 May 1971 - Jaca to Pamplona, 175 km (109 mi)

Route:

Stage 9 result

Rank	Rider	Team	Time
1	Agustín Tamames (ESP)	Werner	4h 18' 13"
2	Miguel María Lasa (ESP)	Orbea–Legnano	+ 10"
3	Wim Schepers (NED)	Goudsmit–Hoff	+ 16"
4	Gerard Vianen (NED)	Fagor–Mercier–Hutchinson	+ 20"
5	Jean-Pierre Danguillaume (FRA)	Peugeot–BP–Michelin	s.t.
6	Désiré Letort (FRA)	Bic	s.t.
7	Edy Schütz (LUX)	Flandria–Mars	s.t.
8	Wilfried David (BEL)	Peugeot–BP–Michelin	s.t.
9	Gérard David (BEL)	Flandria–Mars	s.t.
10	Félix González (ESP)	Orbea–Legnano	s.t.

General classification after Stage 9

Rank	Rider	Team	Time
1	Agustín Tamames (ESP)	Werner	40h 30' 39"
2	Miguel María Lasa (ESP)	Orbea–Legnano	+ 5"
3	Joop Zoetemelk (NED)	Flandria–Mars	+ 17"
4	José Antonio González (ESP)	Kas–Kaskol	+ 17"
5	Ferdinand Bracke (BEL)	Peugeot–BP–Michelin	+ 19"
6	Joaquim Galera (ESP)	Karpy	+ 24"
7	Raymond Poulidor (FRA)	Fagor–Mercier–Hutchinson	+ 25"
8	Désiré Letort (FRA)	Bic	+ 28"
9	José Antonio Pontón Ruiz (ESP)	Werner	+ 36"
10	Wilfried David (BEL)	Peugeot–BP–Michelin	+ 38"
