= 1973 Vuelta a España, Prologue to Stage 9b =

Cycling race stages

The 1973 Vuelta a España was the 28th edition of the Vuelta a España, one of cycling's Grand Tours. The Vuelta began in Calp, with a prologue individual time trial on 26 April, and Stage 9b occurred on 5 May with a stage to Barcelona. The race finished in San Sebastián on 13 May.

== Prologue ==
26 April 1973 - Calp to Calp, 5 km (3.1 mi) (ITT)

Prologue result and general classification after Prologue

Rank	Rider	Team	Time
1	Eddy Merckx (BEL)	Molteni	7' 26"
2	Joaquim Agostinho (POR)	Bic	+ 3"
3	José Antonio González (ESP)	Kas–Kaskol	+ 4"
4	Luis Ocaña (ESP)	Bic	+ 6"
5	Ferdinand Bracke (BEL)	Peugeot–BP–Michelin	s.t.
6	Bernard Thévenet (FRA)	Peugeot–BP–Michelin	+ 8"
7	Francisco Elorriaga (ESP)	Kas–Kaskol	s.t.
8	Jesús Manzaneque (ESP)	La Casera–Peña Bahamontes	s.t.
9	José Pesarrodona (ESP)	Kas–Kaskol	+ 11"
10	Vicente López Carril (ESP)	Kas–Kaskol	s.t.

== Stage 1 ==
27 April 1973 - Calp to Murcia, 187 km (116.2 mi)

Stage 1 result

Rank	Rider	Team	Time
1	Pieter Nassen (BEL)	Rokado–De Gribaldy	4h 36' 02"
2	Gerben Karstens (NED)	Rokado–De Gribaldy	+ 10"
3	Eddy Peelman (BEL)	Rokado–De Gribaldy	+ 16"
4	Eric Leman (BEL)	Peugeot–BP–Michelin	+ 20"
5	José Casas García (ESP)	Monteverde	s.t.
6	Andrés Oliva (ESP)	La Casera–Peña Bahamontes	s.t.
7	Jaime Huélamo (ESP)	Kas–Kaskol	s.t.
8	José Viejo (ESP)	La Casera–Peña Bahamontes	s.t.
9	Segundo Goicoechea (ESP)	Monteverde	s.t.
10	Jos Huysmans (BEL)	Molteni	s.t.

General classification after Stage 1

Rank	Rider	Team	Time
1	Eddy Merckx (BEL)	Molteni	4h 43' 48"
2	Francisco Elorriaga (ESP)	Kas–Kaskol	+ 3"
3	Joaquim Agostinho (POR)	Bic	s.t.
4	José Antonio González (ESP)	Kas–Kaskol	+ 4"
5	Ferdinand Bracke (BEL)	Peugeot–BP–Michelin	+ 6"
6	Luis Ocaña (ESP)	Bic	s.t.
7	Gerben Karstens (NED)	Rokado–De Gribaldy	+ 8"
8	Jesús Manzaneque (ESP)	La Casera–Peña Bahamontes	s.t.
9	Bernard Thévenet (FRA)	Peugeot–BP–Michelin	s.t.
10	Vicente López Carril (ESP)	Kas–Kaskol	+ 11"

== Stage 2 ==
28 April 1973 - Murcia to Albacete, 156 km (96.9 mi)

Stage 2 result

Rank	Rider	Team	Time
1	Gerben Karstens (NED)	Rokado–De Gribaldy	4h 35' 50"
2	Domingo Perurena (ESP)	Kas–Kaskol	+ 11"
3	Eddy Peelman (BEL)	Rokado–De Gribaldy	+ 17"
4	Pieter Nassen (BEL)	Rokado–De Gribaldy	+ 21"
5	Francisco Elorriaga (ESP)	Kas–Kaskol	s.t.
6	Pedro Torres (ESP)	La Casera–Peña Bahamontes	s.t.
7	Roger Swerts (BEL)	Molteni	s.t.
8	Eddy Merckx (BEL)	Molteni	s.t.
9	Nemesio Jiménez (ESP)	Kas–Kaskol	s.t.
10	Herman Van Springel (BEL)	Rokado–De Gribaldy	s.t.

General classification after Stage 2

Rank	Rider	Team	Time
1	Gerben Karstens (NED)	Rokado–De Gribaldy	9h 19' 46"
2	Francisco Elorriaga (ESP)	Kas–Kaskol	+ 11"
3	Eddy Merckx (BEL)	Molteni	+ 13"
4	Domingo Perurena (ESP)	Kas–Kaskol	+ 15"
5	José Antonio González (ESP)	Kas–Kaskol	+ 17"
6	Luis Ocaña (ESP)	Bic	+ 19"
7	Jesús Manzaneque (ESP)	La Casera–Peña Bahamontes	+ 21"
8	Bernard Thévenet (FRA)	Peugeot–BP–Michelin	s.t.
9	Roger Swerts (BEL)	Molteni	+ 26"
10	Pedro Torres (ESP)	La Casera–Peña Bahamontes	+ 28"

== Stage 3 ==
29 April 1973 - Albacete to Alcázar de San Juan, 146 km (91 mi)

Stage 3 result

Rank	Rider	Team	Time
1	Pieter Nassen (BEL)	Rokado–De Gribaldy	3h 52' 06"
2	Jean-Jacques Fussien (FRA)	Bic	+ 10"
3	Domingo Perurena (ESP)	Kas–Kaskol	+ 16"
4	Gerben Karstens (NED)	Rokado–De Gribaldy	+ 20"
5	Roger Rosiers (BEL)	Bic	s.t.
6	Andrés Oliva (ESP)	La Casera–Peña Bahamontes	s.t.
7	Jesús Manzaneque (ESP)	La Casera–Peña Bahamontes	s.t.
8	Segundo Goicoechea (ESP)	Monteverde	s.t.
9	José Gómez (ESP)	La Casera–Peña Bahamontes	s.t.
10	José Viejo (ESP)	La Casera–Peña Bahamontes	s.t.

General classification after Stage 3

Rank	Rider	Team	Time
1	Gerben Karstens (NED)	Rokado–De Gribaldy	13h 12' 07"
2	Domingo Perurena (ESP)	Kas–Kaskol	+ 16"
3	Francisco Elorriaga (ESP)	Kas–Kaskol	s.t.
4	Eddy Merckx (BEL)	Molteni	+ 18"
5	Pieter Nassen (BEL)	Rokado–De Gribaldy	+ 22"
6	José Antonio González (ESP)	Kas–Kaskol	s.t.
7	Luis Ocaña (ESP)	Bic	+ 24"
8	Jesús Manzaneque (ESP)	La Casera–Peña Bahamontes	+ 28"
9	Bernard Thévenet (FRA)	Peugeot–BP–Michelin	s.t.
10	Roger Swerts (BEL)	Molteni	+ 31"

== Stage 4 ==
30 April 1973 - Alcázar de San Juan to Cuenca, 169 km (105 mi)

Stage 4 result

Rank	Rider	Team	Time
1	Jos Deschoenmaecker (BEL)	Molteni	4h 06' 02"
2	José Pesarrodona (ESP)	Kas–Kaskol	+ 13"
3	Eddy Merckx (BEL)	Molteni	+ 2' 30"
4	Domingo Perurena (ESP)	Kas–Kaskol	+ 2' 36"
5	Pedro Torres (ESP)	La Casera–Peña Bahamontes	+ 2' 38"
6	Luis Ocaña (ESP)	Bic	s.t.
7	Herman Van Springel (BEL)	Rokado–De Gribaldy	+ 2' 42"
8	Bernard Thévenet (FRA)	Peugeot–BP–Michelin	+ 2' 44"
9	Joaquim Agostinho (POR)	Bic	+ 2' 48"
10	Juan Santiago Zurano Jerez (ESP)	La Casera–Peña Bahamontes	s.t.

== Stage 5 ==
1 May 1973 - Cuenca to Teruel, 191 km (119 mi)

Stage 5 result

Rank	Rider	Team	Time
1	Gerben Karstens (NED)	Rokado–De Gribaldy	4h 57' 40"
2	Eddy Merckx (BEL)	Molteni	+ 10"
3	Pieter Nassen (BEL)	Rokado–De Gribaldy	+ 16"
4	Jacques Esclassan (FRA)	Peugeot–BP–Michelin	+ 20"
5	Jean-Jacques Fussien (FRA)	Bic	s.t.
6	Jesús Manzaneque (ESP)	La Casera–Peña Bahamontes	s.t.
7	Domingo Perurena (ESP)	Kas–Kaskol	s.t.
8	Nemesio Jiménez (ESP)	Kas–Kaskol	s.t.
9	Roger Swerts (BEL)	Molteni	s.t.
10	Francisco Elorriaga (ESP)	Kas–Kaskol	s.t.

General classification after Stage 5

Rank	Rider	Team	Time
1	José Pesarrodona (ESP)	Kas–Kaskol	22h 17' 32"
2	Eddy Merckx (BEL)	Molteni	+ 1' 15"
3	Gerben Karstens (NED)	Rokado–De Gribaldy	+ 1' 22"
4	Domingo Perurena (ESP)	Kas–Kaskol	+ 1' 24"
5	Jos Deschoenmaecker (BEL)	Molteni	+ 1' 36"
6	Luis Ocaña (ESP)	Bic	+ 1' 39"
7	Bernard Thévenet (FRA)	Peugeot–BP–Michelin	+ 1' 47"
8	Pedro Torres (ESP)	La Casera–Peña Bahamontes	+ 1' 48"
9	José Antonio González (ESP)	Kas–Kaskol	+ 1' 50"
10	Herman Van Springel (BEL)	Rokado–De Gribaldy	+ 1' 58"

== Stage 6a ==
2 May 1973 - Teruel to La Pobla de Farnals, 150 km (93 mi)

Stage 6a result

Rank	Rider	Team	Time
1	Roger Swerts (BEL)	Molteni	3h 35' 49"
2	Bernard Labourdette (FRA)	Bic	+ 11"
3	Gerben Karstens (NED)	Rokado–De Gribaldy	+ 18"
4	Domingo Perurena (ESP)	Kas–Kaskol	+ 22"
5	Eddy Merckx (BEL)	Molteni	s.t.
6	Jacques Esclassan (FRA)	Peugeot–BP–Michelin	s.t.
7	Victor Van Schil (BEL)	Molteni	s.t.
8	Francisco Elorriaga (ESP)	Kas–Kaskol	s.t.
9	Frans Mintjens (BEL)	Molteni	s.t.
10	José Luis Abilleira (ESP)	La Casera–Peña Bahamontes	s.t.

== Stage 6b ==
2 May 1973 - La Pobla de Farnals, 5 km (3.1 mi) (TTT)

Stage 6b result

Rank	Rider	Team	Time
1	Molteni	26' 32"	
2	Kas–Kaskol	+ 50"	
3	Bic	+ 56"	
4	La Casera–Peña Bahamontes	+ 1' 30"	
5	Rokado–De Gribaldy	+ 1' 44"	
6	Monteverde	+ 1' 56"	
7	Peugeot–BP–Michelin	+ 2' 16"	
8	Coelima–Benfica	+ 2' 18"	

General classification after Stage 6b

Rank	Rider	Team	Time
1	José Pesarrodona (ESP)	Kas–Kaskol	25h 53' 35"
2	Eddy Merckx (BEL)	Molteni	+ 1' 03"
3	Gerben Karstens (NED)	Rokado–De Gribaldy	+ 1' 24"
4	Domingo Perurena (ESP)	Kas–Kaskol	+ 1' 26"
5	Jos Deschoenmaecker (BEL)	Molteni	+ 1' 34"
6	Luis Ocaña (ESP)	Bic	+ 1' 41"
7	Roger Swerts (BEL)	Molteni	+ 1' 48"
8	José Antonio González (ESP)	Kas–Kaskol	+ 1' 50"
9	Bernard Thévenet (FRA)	Peugeot–BP–Michelin	+ 1' 55"
10	Pedro Torres (ESP)	La Casera–Peña Bahamontes	+ 1' 56"

== Stage 7 ==
3 May 1973 - La Pobla de Farnals to Castellón de la Plana, 165 km (103 mi)

Route:

Stage 7 result

Rank	Rider	Team	Time
1	Gerben Karstens (NED)	Rokado–De Gribaldy	4h 31' 02"
2	Roger Swerts (BEL)	Molteni	+ 10"
3	Jacques Esclassan (FRA)	Peugeot–BP–Michelin	+ 16"
4	Domingo Perurena (ESP)	Kas–Kaskol	+ 20"
5	Paul Collaer (BEL)	Rokado–De Gribaldy	s.t.
6	Andrés Oliva (ESP)	La Casera–Peña Bahamontes	s.t.
7	Juan Santiago Zurano Jerez (ESP)	La Casera–Peña Bahamontes	s.t.
8	Jaime Huélamo (ESP)	Kas–Kaskol	s.t.
9	Francisco Elorriaga (ESP)	Kas–Kaskol	s.t.
10	Pedro Torres (ESP)	La Casera–Peña Bahamontes	s.t.

General classification after stage 7

Rank	Rider	Team	Time
1	José Pesarrodona (ESP)	Kas–Kaskol	30h 24' 57"
2	Eddy Merckx (BEL)	Molteni	+ 51"
3	Gerben Karstens (NED)	Rokado–De Gribaldy	+ 1' 06"
4	Domingo Perurena (ESP)	Kas–Kaskol	+ 1' 24"
5	Jos Deschoenmaecker (BEL)	Molteni	+ 1' 34"
6	Roger Swerts (BEL)	Molteni	+ 1' 38"
7	Luis Ocaña (ESP)	Bic	+ 1' 41"
8	José Antonio González (ESP)	Kas–Kaskol	+ 1' 50"
9	Bernard Thévenet (FRA)	Peugeot–BP–Michelin	+ 1' 55"
10	Pedro Torres (ESP)	La Casera–Peña Bahamontes	+ 1' 56"

== Stage 8 ==
4 May 1973 - Castellón de la Plana to Calafell, 245 km (152 mi)

Route:

Stage 8 result

Rank	Rider	Team	Time
1	Eddy Peelman (BEL)	Rokado–De Gribaldy	7h 05' 24"
2	Eddy Merckx (BEL)	Molteni	+ 10"
3	Eric Leman (BEL)	Peugeot–BP–Michelin	+ 16"
4	Frans Mintjens (BEL)	Molteni	+ 20"
5	José Gómez (ESP)	La Casera–Peña Bahamontes	s.t.
6	Gerben Karstens (NED)	Rokado–De Gribaldy	s.t.
7	Victor Van Schil (BEL)	Molteni	s.t.
8	Roger Swerts (BEL)	Molteni	s.t.
9	Andrés Oliva (ESP)	La Casera–Peña Bahamontes	s.t.
10	Domingo Perurena (ESP)	Kas–Kaskol	s.t.

General classification after Stage 8

Rank	Rider	Team	Time
1	José Pesarrodona (ESP)	Kas–Kaskol	37h 30' 41"
2	Eddy Merckx (BEL)	Molteni	+ 29"
3	Gerben Karstens (NED)	Rokado–De Gribaldy	+ 1' 06"
4	Domingo Perurena (ESP)	Kas–Kaskol	+ 1' 19"
5	Jos Deschoenmaecker (BEL)	Molteni	+ 1' 34"
6	Roger Swerts (BEL)	Molteni	+ 1' 38"
7	Luis Ocaña (ESP)	Bic	+ 1' 41"
8	José Antonio González (ESP)	Kas–Kaskol	+ 1' 50"
9	Bernard Thévenet (FRA)	Peugeot–BP–Michelin	+ 1' 55"
10	Pedro Torres (ESP)	La Casera–Peña Bahamontes	+ 1' 56"

== Stage 9a ==
5 May 1973 - Calafell to Barcelona, 80 km (50 mi)

Route:

Stage 9a result

Rank	Rider	Team	Time
1	Juan Manuel Santisteban (ESP)	Monteverde	1h 52' 34"
2	Pedro Torres (ESP)	La Casera–Peña Bahamontes	+ 1' 41"
3	Victor Van Schil (BEL)	Molteni	+ 1' 44"
4	Gerben Karstens (NED)	Rokado–De Gribaldy	+ 1' 53"
5	Pieter Nassen (BEL)	Rokado–De Gribaldy	s.t.
6	Jaime Huélamo (ESP)	Kas–Kaskol	s.t.
7	Roger Swerts (BEL)	Molteni	s.t.
8	Jacques Esclassan (FRA)	Peugeot–BP–Michelin	s.t.
9	Eddy Merckx (BEL)	Molteni	s.t.
10	Domingo Perurena (ESP)	Kas–Kaskol	s.t.

== Stage 9b ==
5 May 1973 - Barcelona to Barcelona, 37.9 km (23.5 mi) (ITT)

Stage 9b result

Rank	Rider	Team	Time
1	Jacques Esclassan (FRA)	Peugeot–BP–Michelin	53' 11"
2	Gerben Karstens (NED)	Rokado–De Gribaldy	+ 5"
3	Pieter Nassen (BEL)	Rokado–De Gribaldy	+ 8"
4	Jesús Manzaneque (ESP)	La Casera–Peña Bahamontes	+ 10"
5	Victor Van Schil (BEL)	Molteni	s.t.
6	Roger Swerts (BEL)	Molteni	s.t.
7	José Viejo (ESP)	La Casera–Peña Bahamontes	s.t.
8	Joaquim Agostinho (POR)	Bic	s.t.
9	Francisco Elorriaga (ESP)	Kas–Kaskol	s.t.
10	Fernando Mendes (POR)	Coelima–Benfica	s.t.

General classification after Stage 9b

Rank	Rider	Team	Time
1	José Pesarrodona (ESP)	Kas–Kaskol	40h 18' 19"
2	Eddy Merckx (BEL)	Molteni	+ 29"
3	Gerben Karstens (NED)	Rokado–De Gribaldy	+ 1' 01"
4	Domingo Perurena (ESP)	Kas–Kaskol	+ 1' 19"
5	Jos Deschoenmaecker (BEL)	Molteni	+ 1' 34"
6	Roger Swerts (BEL)	Molteni	+ 1' 38"
7	Luis Ocaña (ESP)	Bic	+ 1' 41"
8	Pedro Torres (ESP)	La Casera–Peña Bahamontes	+ 1' 44"
9	José Antonio González (ESP)	Kas–Kaskol	+ 1' 50"
10	Bernard Thévenet (FRA)	Peugeot–BP–Michelin	+ 1' 55"
