= 1973 Vuelta a España, Stage 10 to Stage 17b =

Cycling race stages

The 1973 Vuelta a España was the 28th edition of the Vuelta a España, one of cycling's Grand Tours. The Vuelta began in Calp, with a prologue individual time trial on 26 April, and Stage 10 occurred on 6 May with a stage from Barcelona. The race finished in San Sebastián on 13 May.

== Stage 10 ==
6 May 1973 - Barcelona to Empuriabrava, 171 km (106.3 mi)

Route:

Stage 10 result

Rank	Rider	Team	Time
1	Eddy Merckx (BEL)	Molteni	5h 29' 54"
2	Jacques Esclassan (FRA)	Peugeot–BP–Michelin	+ 10"
3	Francisco Elorriaga (ESP)	Kas–Kaskol	+ 16"
4	Roger Swerts (BEL)	Molteni	+ 20"
5	Gerben Karstens (NED)	Rokado–De Gribaldy	s.t.
6	Pieter Nassen (BEL)	Rokado–De Gribaldy	s.t.
7	Eric Leman (BEL)	Peugeot–BP–Michelin	s.t.
8	José Viejo (ESP)	La Casera–Peña Bahamontes	s.t.
9	Eddy Peelman (BEL)	Rokado–De Gribaldy	s.t.
10	José Luis Abilleira (ESP)	La Casera–Peña Bahamontes	+ 21"

General classification after Stage 10

Rank	Rider	Team	Time
1	José Pesarrodona (ESP)	Kas–Kaskol	45h 48' 36"
2	Eddy Merckx (BEL)	Molteni	+ 6"
3	Gerben Karstens (NED)	Rokado–De Gribaldy	+ 58"
4	Domingo Perurena (ESP)	Kas–Kaskol	+ 1' 19"
5	Jos Deschoenmaecker (BEL)	Molteni	+ 1' 34"
6	Roger Swerts (BEL)	Molteni	+ 1' 35"
7	Luis Ocaña (ESP)	Bic	+ 1' 41"
8	Pedro Torres (ESP)	La Casera–Peña Bahamontes	+ 1' 42"
9	José Antonio González (ESP)	Kas–Kaskol	+ 1' 50"
10	Bernard Thévenet (FRA)	Peugeot–BP–Michelin	+ 1' 55"

== Stage 11 ==
7 May 1973 - Empuriabrava to Manresa, 225 km (139.8 mi)

Route:

Stage 11 result

Rank	Rider	Team	Time
1	Bernard Thévenet (FRA)	Peugeot–BP–Michelin	6h 40' 45"
2	Eddy Merckx (BEL)	Molteni	+ 10"
3	Agustín Tamames (ESP)	La Casera–Peña Bahamontes	+ 16"
4	Luis Ocaña (ESP)	Bic	+ 20"
5	Joaquim Agostinho (POR)	Bic	s.t.
6	Pedro Torres (ESP)	La Casera–Peña Bahamontes	s.t.
7	José Pesarrodona (ESP)	Kas–Kaskol	s.t.
8	Luis Balagué (ESP)	La Casera–Peña Bahamontes	s.t.
9	Antonio Martos Aguilar (ESP)	Kas–Kaskol	+ 6' 23"
10	Gerben Karstens (NED)	Rokado–De Gribaldy	+ 6' 30"

== Stage 12 ==
8 May 1973 - Manresa to Zaragoza, 259 km (160.9 mi)

Route:

Stage 12 result

Rank	Rider	Team	Time
1	Gerben Karstens (NED)	Rokado–De Gribaldy	8h 45' 48"
2	Pieter Nassen (BEL)	Rokado–De Gribaldy	+ 10"
3	Francisco Elorriaga (ESP)	Kas–Kaskol	+ 16"
4	Eddy Merckx (BEL)	Molteni	+ 20"
5	Jacques Esclassan (FRA)	Peugeot–BP–Michelin	s.t.
6	Andrés Oliva (ESP)	La Casera–Peña Bahamontes	s.t.
7	Roger Swerts (BEL)	Molteni	s.t.
8	José Antonio González (ESP)	Kas–Kaskol	s.t.
9	Frans Mintjens (BEL)	Molteni	s.t.
10	Segundo Goicoechea (ESP)	Monteverde	s.t.

General classification after Stage 12

Rank	Rider	Team	Time
1	Eddy Merckx (BEL)	Molteni	61h 15' 32"
2	José Pesarrodona (ESP)	Kas–Kaskol	+ 17"
3	Bernard Thévenet (FRA)	Peugeot–BP–Michelin	+ 1' 44"
4	Luis Ocaña (ESP)	Bic	+ 1' 58"
5	Pedro Torres (ESP)	La Casera–Peña Bahamontes	+ 1' 59"
6	Joaquim Agostinho (POR)	Bic	+ 2' 44"
7	Agustín Tamames (ESP)	La Casera–Peña Bahamontes	+ 3' 18"
8	Luis Balagué (ESP)	La Casera–Peña Bahamontes	+ 5' 07"
9	Gerben Karstens (NED)	Rokado–De Gribaldy	+ 7' 05"
10	Roger Swerts (BEL)	Molteni	+ 7' 57"

== Stage 13 ==
9 May 1973 - Mallén to Irache, 175 km (109 mi)

Planned route:

Stage 13 result

Rank	Rider	Team	Time
1	Domingo Perurena (ESP)	Kas–Kaskol	5h 36' 34"
2	Eddy Merckx (BEL)	Molteni	+ 30"
3	Joaquim Agostinho (POR)	Bic	+ 35"
4	Luis Ocaña (ESP)	Bic	+ 41"
5	Roger Swerts (BEL)	Molteni	s.t.
6	Andrés Oliva (ESP)	La Casera–Peña Bahamontes	s.t.
7	Victor Van Schil (BEL)	Molteni	s.t.
8	Francisco Elorriaga (ESP)	Kas–Kaskol	s.t.
9	Pedro Torres (ESP)	La Casera–Peña Bahamontes	s.t.
10	José Pesarrodona (ESP)	Kas–Kaskol	s.t.

General classification after Stage 13

Rank	Rider	Team	Time
1	Eddy Merckx (BEL)	Molteni	66h 52' 31"
2	José Pesarrodona (ESP)	Kas–Kaskol	+ 35"
3	Bernard Thévenet (FRA)	Peugeot–BP–Michelin	+ 2' 00"
4	Pedro Torres (ESP)	La Casera–Peña Bahamontes	+ 2' 07"
5	Luis Ocaña (ESP)	Bic	+ 2' 14"
6	Joaquim Agostinho (POR)	Bic	+ 2' 56"
7	Agustín Tamames (ESP)	La Casera–Peña Bahamontes	+ 3' 34"
8	Luis Balagué (ESP)	La Casera–Peña Bahamontes	+ 5' 23"
9	Roger Swerts (BEL)	Molteni	+ 8' 13"
10	Jos Deschoenmaecker (BEL)	Molteni	+ 8' 17"

== Stage 14 ==
10 May 1973 - Irache to Bilbao, 182 km (113 mi)

Route:

Stage 14 result

Rank	Rider	Team	Time
1	Juan Santiago Zurano Jerez (ESP)	La Casera–Peña Bahamontes	5h 00' 22"
2	José Luis Uribezubia (ESP)	Kas–Kaskol	+ 45"
3	Gerben Karstens (NED)	Rokado–De Gribaldy	+ 1' 36"
4	Jacques Esclassan (FRA)	Peugeot–BP–Michelin	+ 1' 40"
5	Pieter Nassen (BEL)	Rokado–De Gribaldy	s.t.
6	Roger Swerts (BEL)	Molteni	s.t.
7	Domingo Perurena (ESP)	Kas–Kaskol	s.t.
8	Félix González (ESP)	La Casera–Peña Bahamontes	s.t.
9	Andrés Oliva (ESP)	La Casera–Peña Bahamontes	s.t.
10	Pedro Torres (ESP)	La Casera–Peña Bahamontes	s.t.

General classification after Stage 14

Rank	Rider	Team	Time
1	Eddy Merckx (BEL)	Molteni	71h 54' 21"
2	José Pesarrodona (ESP)	Kas–Kaskol	+ 45"
3	Bernard Thévenet (FRA)	Peugeot–BP–Michelin	+ 2' 08"
4	Pedro Torres (ESP)	La Casera–Peña Bahamontes	+ 2' 19"
5	Luis Ocaña (ESP)	Bic	+ 2' 26"
6	Joaquim Agostinho (POR)	Bic	+ 3' 08"
7	Agustín Tamames (ESP)	La Casera–Peña Bahamontes	+ 3' 46"
8	Luis Balagué (ESP)	La Casera–Peña Bahamontes	+ 5' 35"
9	Roger Swerts (BEL)	Molteni	+ 8' 25"
10	José Antonio González (ESP)	Kas–Kaskol	+ 8' 45"

== Stage 15a ==
11 May 1973 - Bilbao to Torrelavega, 154 km (96 mi)

Route:

Stage 15a result

Rank	Rider	Team	Time
1	Eddy Peelman (BEL)	Rokado–De Gribaldy	3h 26' 10"
2	Jesús Manzaneque (ESP)	La Casera–Peña Bahamontes	+ 5"
3	José Catieau (FRA)	Bic	+ 8"
4	José Antonio González (ESP)	Kas–Kaskol	+ 10"
5	Edward Janssens (BEL)	Molteni	s.t.
6	Francisco Elorriaga (ESP)	Kas–Kaskol	+ 42"
7	Gerben Karstens (NED)	Rokado–De Gribaldy	s.t.
8	Pieter Nassen (BEL)	Rokado–De Gribaldy	s.t.
9	Segundo Goicoechea (ESP)	Monteverde	s.t.
10	Félix González (ESP)	La Casera–Peña Bahamontes	s.t.

== Stage 15b ==
11 May 1973 - Torrelavega to Torrelavega, 17.4 km (10.8 mi) (ITT)

Route:

Stage 15b result

Rank	Rider	Team	Time
1	Eddy Merckx (BEL)	Molteni	22' 20"
2	Roger Swerts (BEL)	Molteni	+ 37"
3	Luis Ocaña (ESP)	Bic	+ 44"
4	Bernard Thévenet (FRA)	Peugeot–BP–Michelin	+ 48"
5	José Pesarrodona (ESP)	Kas–Kaskol	+ 1' 03"
6	Pedro Torres (ESP)	La Casera–Peña Bahamontes	+ 1' 06"
7	Joaquim Agostinho (POR)	Bic	+ 1' 13"
8	Agustín Tamames (ESP)	La Casera–Peña Bahamontes	+ 1' 30"
9	Jesús Manzaneque (ESP)	La Casera–Peña Bahamontes	+ 1' 32"
10	José Antonio González (ESP)	Kas–Kaskol	+ 1' 42"

General classification after Stage 15b

Rank	Rider	Team	Time
1	Eddy Merckx (BEL)	Molteni	75h 43' 33"
2	José Pesarrodona (ESP)	Kas–Kaskol	+ 1' 48"
3	Bernard Thévenet (FRA)	Peugeot–BP–Michelin	+ 3' 00"
4	Luis Ocaña (ESP)	Bic	+ 3' 10"
5	Pedro Torres (ESP)	La Casera–Peña Bahamontes	+ 3' 25"
6	Joaquim Agostinho (POR)	Bic	+ 4' 21"
7	Agustín Tamames (ESP)	La Casera–Peña Bahamontes	+ 5' 16"
8	Luis Balagué (ESP)	La Casera–Peña Bahamontes	+ 7' 47"
9	Roger Swerts (BEL)	Molteni	+ 9' 02"
10	José Antonio González (ESP)	Kas–Kaskol	+ 9' 55"

== Stage 16 ==
12 May 1973 - Torrelavega to Miranda de Ebro, 203 km (126 mi)

Route:

Stage 16 result

Rank	Rider	Team	Time
1	Eddy Merckx (BEL)	Molteni	5h 57' 59"
2	Luis Ocaña (ESP)	Bic	+ 11"
3	Bernard Thévenet (FRA)	Peugeot–BP–Michelin	+ 17"
4	Herman Van Springel (BEL)	Rokado–De Gribaldy	+ 2' 55"
5	Victor Van Schil (BEL)	Molteni	s.t.
6	Joaquim Agostinho (POR)	Bic	s.t.
7	Andrés Oliva (ESP)	La Casera–Peña Bahamontes	s.t.
8	Fernando Dias Ferreira (POR)	Coelima–Benfica	s.t.
9	Antonio Martos Aguilar (ESP)	Kas–Kaskol	s.t.
10	Edward Janssens (BEL)	Molteni	s.t.

General classification after Stage 16

Rank	Rider	Team	Time
1	Eddy Merckx (BEL)	Molteni	81h 41' 24"
2	Luis Ocaña (ESP)	Bic	+ 3' 13"
3	Bernard Thévenet (FRA)	Peugeot–BP–Michelin	+ 3' 25"
4	José Pesarrodona (ESP)	Kas–Kaskol	+ 4' 51"
5	Pedro Torres (ESP)	La Casera–Peña Bahamontes	+ 6' 28"
6	Joaquim Agostinho (POR)	Bic	+ 7' 24"
7	Agustín Tamames (ESP)	La Casera–Peña Bahamontes	+ 8' 19"
8	Luis Balagué (ESP)	La Casera–Peña Bahamontes	+ 10' 50"
9	Roger Swerts (BEL)	Molteni	+ 13' 00"
10	José Catieau (FRA)	Bic	+ 13' 57"

== Stage 17a ==
13 May 1973 - Miranda de Ebro to Tolosa, 127 km (79 mi)

Route:

Stage 17a result

Rank	Rider	Team	Time
1	Eddy Peelman (BEL)	Rokado–De Gribaldy	2h 47' 24"
2	Pieter Nassen (BEL)	Rokado–De Gribaldy	+ 5"
3	Roger Swerts (BEL)	Molteni	+ 8"
4	Francisco Elorriaga (ESP)	Kas–Kaskol	+ 10"
5	Domingo Perurena (ESP)	Kas–Kaskol	s.t.
6	Herman Van Springel (BEL)	Rokado–De Gribaldy	s.t.
7	Jesús Manzaneque (ESP)	La Casera–Peña Bahamontes	s.t.
8	Frans Mintjens (BEL)	Molteni	s.t.
9	José Casas García (ESP)	Monteverde	s.t.
10	Nemesio Jiménez (ESP)	Kas–Kaskol	s.t.

== Stage 17b ==
13 May 1973 - Hernani to San Sebastián, 10.5 km (6.5 mi) (ITT)

Route:

Stage 17b result

Rank	Rider	Team	Time
1	Eddy Merckx (BEL)	Molteni	12' 02"
2	Roger Swerts (BEL)	Molteni	+ 29"
3	Luis Ocaña (ESP)	Bic	+ 32"
4	Bernard Thévenet (FRA)	Peugeot–BP–Michelin	+ 51"
5	Joaquim Agostinho (POR)	Bic	s.t.
6	Ferdinand Bracke (BEL)	Peugeot–BP–Michelin	+ 53"
7	Victor Van Schil (BEL)	Molteni	+ 55"
8	Agustín Tamames (ESP)	La Casera–Peña Bahamontes	+ 56"
9	Domingo Perurena (ESP)	Kas–Kaskol	+ 57"
10	Herman Van Springel (BEL)	Rokado–De Gribaldy	+ 1' 00"

General classification after Stage 17b

Rank	Rider	Team	Time
1	Eddy Merckx (BEL)	Molteni	84h 40' 50"
2	Luis Ocaña (ESP)	Bic	+ 3' 46"
3	Bernard Thévenet (FRA)	Peugeot–BP–Michelin	+ 4' 16"
4	José Pesarrodona (ESP)	Kas–Kaskol	+ 5' 54"
5	Pedro Torres (ESP)	La Casera–Peña Bahamontes	+ 7' 29"
6	Joaquim Agostinho (POR)	Bic	+ 8' 15"
7	Agustín Tamames (ESP)	La Casera–Peña Bahamontes	+ 9' 15"
8	Luis Balagué (ESP)	La Casera–Peña Bahamontes	+ 12' 26"
9	Roger Swerts (BEL)	Molteni	+ 13' 27"
10	José Catieau (FRA)	Bic	+ 15' 01"
