= 1971 Vuelta a España, Stage 10 to Stage 17b =

Cycling race stages

The 1971 Vuelta a España was the 26th edition of the Vuelta a España, one of cycling's Grand Tours. The Vuelta began in Almería, with a prologue individual time trial on 29 April, and Stage 10 occurred on 9 May with a stage from Pamplona. The race finished in Madrid on 16 May.

== Stage 10 ==
9 May 1971 - Pamplona to San Sebastián, 120 km (74.6 mi)

Route:

Stage 10 result

Rank	Rider	Team	Time
1	Gerard Vianen (NED)	Fagor–Mercier–Hutchinson	2h 43' 23"
2	Cyrille Guimard (FRA)	Fagor–Mercier–Hutchinson	+ 11"
3	Gerben Karstens (NED)	Goudsmit–Hoff	+ 17"
4	Domingo Perurena (ESP)	Kas–Kaskol	+ 21"
5	Walter Godefroot (BEL)	Peugeot–BP–Michelin	s.t.
6	Ramón Sáez Marzo (ESP)	Werner	s.t.
7	Antonio Ayestarán Beain (ESP)	Orbea–Legnano	+ 20"
8	Demetrio Martí Luján (ESP)	Orbea–Legnano	s.t.
9	Roger Loysch (BEL)	Flandria–Mars	s.t.
10	Julián Cuevas González (ESP)	Karpy	s.t.

General classification after Stage 10

Rank	Rider	Team	Time
1	Agustín Tamames (ESP)	Werner	43h 14' 23"
2	Miguel María Lasa (ESP)	Orbea–Legnano	+ 5"
3	José Antonio González (ESP)	Kas–Kaskol	+ 17"
4	Joop Zoetemelk (NED)	Flandria–Mars	+ 19"
5	Ferdinand Bracke (BEL)	Peugeot–BP–Michelin	s.t.
6	Joaquim Galera (ESP)	Karpy	+ 24"
7	Raymond Poulidor (FRA)	Fagor–Mercier–Hutchinson	+ 25"
8	Désiré Letort (FRA)	Bic	+ 28"
9	Luis Balagué (ESP)	Werner	+ 32"
10	Rolf Wolfshohl (FRG)	Fagor–Mercier–Hutchinson	+ 35"

== Stage 11a ==
10 May 1971 - San Sebastián to Bilbao, 140 km (87.0 mi)

Route:

Stage 11a result

Rank	Rider	Team	Time
1	Gerben Karstens (NED)	Goudsmit–Hoff	3h 35' 04"
2	Cyrille Guimard (FRA)	Fagor–Mercier–Hutchinson	+ 3"
3	Evert Dolman (NED)	Flandria–Mars	+ 12"
4	Walter Godefroot (BEL)	Peugeot–BP–Michelin	s.t.
5	Miguel María Lasa (ESP)	Orbea–Legnano	s.t.
6	Eddy Peelman (BEL)	Fagor–Mercier–Hutchinson	s.t.
7	Jan Krekels (NED)	Goudsmit–Hoff	s.t.
8	Désiré Letort (FRA)	Bic	s.t.
9	Roger Loysch (BEL)	Flandria–Mars	s.t.

== Stage 11b ==
10 May 1971 - Bilbao to Bilbao, 2.65 km (1.6 mi) (ITT)

Stage 11b result

Rank	Rider	Team	Time
1	José Antonio González (ESP)	Kas–Kaskol	3' 02"
2	Miguel María Lasa (ESP)	Orbea–Legnano	+ 0.2"
3	René Pijnen (NED)	Bic	+ 2.6"
4	Wim Schepers (NED)	Goudsmit–Hoff	+ 6"
5	José Manuel López (ESP)	Werner	s.t.
6	Joop Zoetemelk (NED)	Flandria–Mars	s.t.
7	Rolf Wolfshohl (FRG)	Fagor–Mercier–Hutchinson	+ 7"
8	José Antonio Pontón Ruiz (ESP)	Werner	s.t.
9	Luis Ocaña (ESP)	Bic	s.t.
10	Gerben Karstens (NED)	Goudsmit–Hoff	s.t.

== Stage 12 ==
11 May 1971 - Bilbao to Vitoria, 185 km (115.0 mi)

Route:

Stage 12 result

Rank	Rider	Team	Time
1	Luis Ocaña (ESP)	Bic	4h 45' 30"
2	Wim Schepers (NED)	Goudsmit–Hoff	+ 2' 11"
3	Ferdinand Bracke (BEL)	Peugeot–BP–Michelin	+ 2' 17"
4	Antonio Martos Aguilar (ESP)	Werner	+ 2' 21"
5	Johny Schleck (LUX)	Bic	+ 7' 33"
6	Joaquim Galera (ESP)	Karpy	s.t.
7	José Albelda Tormo (ESP)	Karpy	s.t.
8	Gabriel Mascaró Febrer (ESP)	Kas–Kaskol	s.t.
9	Domingo Perurena (ESP)	Kas–Kaskol	+ 7' 45"
10	Jan van Katwijk (NED)	Goudsmit–Hoff	s.t.

General classification after Stage 12

Rank	Rider	Team	Time
1	Ferdinand Bracke (BEL)	Peugeot–BP–Michelin	51h 41' 02"
2	Wim Schepers (NED)	Goudsmit–Hoff	+ 17"
3	Luis Ocaña (ESP)	Bic	+ 2' 27"
4	Miguel María Lasa (ESP)	Orbea–Legnano	+ 5' 03"
5	Agustín Tamames (ESP)	Werner	+ 5' 07"
6	Joop Zoetemelk (NED)	Flandria–Mars	+ 5' 23"
7	Manuel Galera Magdelano (ESP)	Karpy	+ 5' 29"
8	Antonio Martos Aguilar (ESP)	Werner	+ 5' 32"
9	Désiré Letort (FRA)	Bic	+ 5' 33"
10	Raymond Poulidor (FRA)	Fagor–Mercier–Hutchinson	+ 5' 36"

== Stage 13 ==
12 May 1971 - Vitoria to Torrelavega, 208 km (129 mi)

Route:

Stage 13 result

Rank	Rider	Team	Time
1	Eddy Peelman (BEL)	Fagor–Mercier–Hutchinson	5h 10' 50"
2	Miguel María Lasa (ESP)	Orbea–Legnano	+ 10"
3	Gerben Karstens (NED)	Goudsmit–Hoff	+ 16"
4	José Manuel López (ESP)	Werner	+ 20"
5	Cyrille Guimard (FRA)	Fagor–Mercier–Hutchinson	s.t.
6	Jan Krekels (NED)	Goudsmit–Hoff	s.t.
7	Désiré Letort (FRA)	Bic	s.t.
8	Antonio Menéndez (ESP)	La Casera–Peña Bahamontes	s.t.
9	Ramón Sáez Marzo (ESP)	Werner	s.t.
10	Wim Prinsen (NED)	Goudsmit–Hoff	s.t.

General classification after Stage 13

Rank	Rider	Team	Time
1	Ferdinand Bracke (BEL)	Peugeot–BP–Michelin	56h 52' 12"
2	Wim Schepers (NED)	Goudsmit–Hoff	+ 27"
3	Luis Ocaña (ESP)	Bic	+ 2' 27"
4	Miguel María Lasa (ESP)	Orbea–Legnano	+ 4' 53"
5	Agustín Tamames (ESP)	Werner	+ 5' 07"
6	Joop Zoetemelk (NED)	Flandria–Mars	+ 5' 13"
7	Manuel Galera Magdelano (ESP)	Karpy	+ 5' 29"
8	Antonio Martos Aguilar (ESP)	Werner	+ 5' 32"
9	Désiré Letort (FRA)	Bic	+ 5' 33"
10	Raymond Poulidor (FRA)	Fagor–Mercier–Hutchinson	+ 5' 36"

== Stage 14 ==
13 May 1971 - Torrelavega to Burgos, 192 km (119 mi)

Route:

Stage 14 result

Rank	Rider	Team	Time
1	Wilfried David (BEL)	Peugeot–BP–Michelin	5h 09' 57"
2	Miguel María Lasa (ESP)	Orbea–Legnano	+ 1' 09"
3	Joaquim Galera (ESP)	Karpy	+ 1' 15"
4	Joop Zoetemelk (NED)	Flandria–Mars	+ 3' 12"
5	Luis Ocaña (ESP)	Bic	s.t.
6	Désiré Letort (FRA)	Bic	s.t.
7	Gerben Karstens (NED)	Goudsmit–Hoff	+ 3' 49"
8	Cyrille Guimard (FRA)	Fagor–Mercier–Hutchinson	s.t.
9	Jan Krekels (NED)	Goudsmit–Hoff	s.t.
10	Domingo Perurena (ESP)	Kas–Kaskol	s.t.

General classification after Stage 14

Rank	Rider	Team	Time
1	Ferdinand Bracke (BEL)	Peugeot–BP–Michelin	62h 05' 58"
2	Wim Schepers (NED)	Goudsmit–Hoff	+ 17"
3	Wilfried David (BEL)	Peugeot–BP–Michelin	+ 1' 35"
4	Luis Ocaña (ESP)	Bic	+ 1' 49"
5	Miguel María Lasa (ESP)	Orbea–Legnano	+ 2' 13"
6	Manuel Galera Magdelano (ESP)	Karpy	+ 2' 55"
7	Joop Zoetemelk (NED)	Flandria–Mars	+ 4' 35"
8	Désiré Letort (FRA)	Bic	+ 4' 55"
9	Agustín Tamames (ESP)	Werner	+ 5' 07"
10	Antonio Martos Aguilar (ESP)	Werner	+ 5' 32"

== Stage 15 ==
14 May 1971 - Burgos to Segovia, 188 km (117 mi)

Route:

Stage 15 result

Rank	Rider	Team	Time
1	Cyrille Guimard (FRA)	Fagor–Mercier–Hutchinson	5h 13' 46"
2	Andrés Oliva (ESP)	La Casera–Peña Bahamontes	+ 10"
3	José Gómez (ESP)	Werner	+ 18"
4	Nemesio Jiménez (ESP)	Kas–Kaskol	+ 24"
5	Wim Prinsen (NED)	Goudsmit–Hoff	s.t.
6	José Grande Sánchez (ESP)	Werner	s.t.
7	Tino Tabak (NED)	Flandria–Mars	s.t.
8	José Gómez (ESP)	Werner	s.t.
9	Manuel Galera Magdelano (ESP)	Karpy	s.t.
10	Georges Chappe (FRA)	Fagor–Mercier–Hutchinson	+ 30"

General classification after Stage 15

Rank	Rider	Team	Time
1	Ferdinand Bracke (BEL)	Peugeot–BP–Michelin	67h 20' 41"
2	Wim Schepers (NED)	Goudsmit–Hoff	+ 1' 17"
3	Wilfried David (BEL)	Peugeot–BP–Michelin	+ 1' 34"
4	Luis Ocaña (ESP)	Bic	+ 1' 49"
5	Miguel María Lasa (ESP)	Orbea–Legnano	+ 2' 13"
6	Manuel Galera Magdelano (ESP)	Karpy	+ 2' 20"
7	Joop Zoetemelk (NED)	Flandria–Mars	+ 4' 34"
8	Désiré Letort (FRA)	Bic	+ 4' 54"
9	Agustín Tamames (ESP)	Werner	+ 5' 03"
10	Antonio Martos Aguilar (ESP)	Werner	+ 5' 32"

== Stage 16 ==
15 May 1971 - Segovia to Ávila, 114 km (71 mi)

Route:

Stage 16 result

Rank	Rider	Team	Time
1	Joop Zoetemelk (NED)	Flandria–Mars	3h 02' 52"
2	Wilfried David (BEL)	Peugeot–BP–Michelin	+ 45"
3	José Gómez (ESP)	Werner	+ 51"
4	José Luis Abilleira (ESP)	La Casera–Peña Bahamontes	+ 55"
5	Cyrille Guimard (FRA)	Fagor–Mercier–Hutchinson	+ 1' 06"
6	Gonzalo Aja (ESP)	Karpy	+ 1' 08"
7	Francisco Gabica (ESP)	Kas–Kaskol	s.t.
8	Edy Schütz (LUX)	Flandria–Mars	s.t.
9	Luis Balagué (ESP)	Werner	s.t.
10	Walter Godefroot (BEL)	Peugeot–BP–Michelin	s.t.

General classification after Stage 16

Rank	Rider	Team	Time
1	Ferdinand Bracke (BEL)	Peugeot–BP–Michelin	70h 24' 41"
2	Wim Schepers (NED)	Goudsmit–Hoff	+ 17"
3	Wilfried David (BEL)	Peugeot–BP–Michelin	+ 1' 02"
4	Luis Ocaña (ESP)	Bic	+ 1' 49"
5	Miguel María Lasa (ESP)	Orbea–Legnano	+ 2' 13"
6	Manuel Galera Magdelano (ESP)	Karpy	+ 2' 29"
7	Joop Zoetemelk (NED)	Flandria–Mars	+ 3' 27"
8	Agustín Tamames (ESP)	Werner	+ 5' 03"
9	Désiré Letort (FRA)	Bic	+ 5' 04"
10	Antonio Martos Aguilar (ESP)	Werner	+ 5' 41"

== Stage 17a ==
16 May 1971 - Ávila to Madrid, 138 km (86 mi)

Route:

Stage 17a result

Rank	Rider	Team	Time
1	Wim Schepers (NED)	Goudsmit–Hoff	3h 16' 22"
2	José Antonio González (ESP)	Kas–Kaskol	+ 28"
3	Domingo Perurena (ESP)	Kas–Kaskol	+ 30"
4	Cyrille Guimard (FRA)	Fagor–Mercier–Hutchinson	+ 33"
5	Andrés Oliva (ESP)	La Casera–Peña Bahamontes	s.t.
6	Rolf Wolfshohl (FRG)	Fagor–Mercier–Hutchinson	s.t.
7	Julián Cuevas González (ESP)	Karpy	s.t.
8	Evert Dolman (NED)	Flandria–Mars	s.t.
9	Karl-Heinz Muddemann (FRG)	Flandria–Mars	s.t.
10	Nemesio Jiménez (ESP)	Kas–Kaskol	s.t.

== Stage 17b ==
16 May 1971 - Madrid to Madrid, 5.3 km (3.3 mi) (ITT)

Stage 17b result

Rank	Rider	Team	Time
1	René Pijnen (NED)	Bic	7h 09' 07"
2	José Antonio González (ESP)	Kas–Kaskol	+ 8"
3	Wilfried David (BEL)	Peugeot–BP–Michelin	+ 17"
4	Ferdinand Bracke (BEL)	Peugeot–BP–Michelin	+ 19"
5	Gerben Karstens (NED)	Goudsmit–Hoff	s.t.
6	Wim Schepers (NED)	Goudsmit–Hoff	+ 21"
7	Gonzalo Aja (ESP)	Karpy	+ 22"
8	Antonio Martos Aguilar (ESP)	Werner	+ 24"
9	Miguel María Lasa (ESP)	Orbea–Legnano	s.t.
10	Luis Ocaña (ESP)	Bic	+ 26"

General classification after Stage 17b

Rank	Rider	Team	Time
1	Ferdinand Bracke (BEL)	Peugeot–BP–Michelin	73h 50' 05"
2	Wim Schepers (NED)	Goudsmit–Hoff	+ 19"
3	Wilfried David (BEL)	Peugeot–BP–Michelin	+ 59"
4	Luis Ocaña (ESP)	Bic	+ 1' 51"
5	Miguel María Lasa (ESP)	Orbea–Legnano	+ 2' 18"
6	Manuel Galera Magdelano (ESP)	Karpy	+ 2' 37"
7	Joop Zoetemelk (NED)	Flandria–Mars	+ 2' 48"
8	Agustín Tamames (ESP)	Werner	+ 5' 15"
9	Désiré Letort (FRA)	Bic	+ 5' 45"
10	Antonio Martos Aguilar (ESP)	Werner	+ 6' 01"
