= 1971 Vuelta a España =

Race details
- Dates: 29 April – 16 May
- Stages: 17
- Distance: 2,892 km (1,797 mi)
- Winning time: 73h 50' 05"

Results
Jersey awarded to the overall winner	Winner	Ferdinand Bracke (BEL)	(Peugeot–BP–Michelin)
	Second	Wilfried David (BEL)	(Peugeot–BP–Michelin)
	Third	Luis Ocaña (ESP)	(Bic)
Jersey awarded to the points classification winner	Points	Cyrille Guimard (FRA)	(Fagor–Mercier)
	Mountains	Joop Zoetemelk (NED)	(Mars–Flandria)
Jersey awarded to the combination classification winner	Combination	Cyrille Guimard (FRA)	(Fagor–Mercier)
	Sprints	Cyrille Guimard (FRA)	(Fagor–Mercier)

The 26th Edition Vuelta a España (Tour of Spain), a long-distance bicycle stage race and one of the three grand tours, was held from 29 April to 16 May 1971. It consisted of 17 stages covering a total of 2,892 km (1,797 mi), and was won by Ferdinand Bracke of the Peugeot cycling team. Joop Zoetemelk won the mountains classification while Cyrille Guimard won the points classification.

After the final stage, Wim Schepers was ranked in second place, 19 seconds behind Bracke, but he was given a ten-minute time penalty for a doping offence, and dropped to 15th.

== Route ==
List of stages
Stage	Date	Course	Distance	Type	Winner
P	29 April	Almería – Almería	4.2 km (3 mi)	Individual time trial	René Pijnen (NED)
1	30 April	Almería to Águilas	126 km (78 mi)		Ger Harings (NED)
2	1 May	Águilas to Calp	245 km (152 mi)		Eddy Peelman (BEL)
3	2 May	Calp to La Pobla de Farnals	164 km (102 mi)		Cyrille Guimard (FRA)
4	3 May	La Pobla de Farnals to Benicàssim	175 km (109 mi)		Hubert Hutsebaut (BEL)
5	4 May	Benicàssim to Salou	172 km (107 mi)		René Pijnen (NED)
6	5 May	Salou to Barcelona	149 km (93 mi)		Eddy Peelman (BEL)
7	6 May	Barcelona to Manresa	179 km (111 mi)		Walter Godefroot (BEL)
8	7 May	Balaguer to Jaca	211 km (131 mi)		Walter Godefroot (BEL)
9	8 May	Jaca to Pamplona	175 km (109 mi)		Agustín Tamames (ESP)
10	9 May	Pamplona to San Sebastián	120 km (75 mi)		Gerard Vianen (NED)
11a	10 May	San Sebastián to Bilbao	140 km (87 mi)		Gerben Karstens (NED)
11b	10 May	Bilbao to Bilbao	2.65 km (2 mi)	Individual time trial	José Antonio González (ESP)
12	11 May	Bilbao to Vitoria	185 km (115 mi)		Luis Ocaña (ESP)
13	12 May	Vitoria to Torrelavega	208 km (129 mi)		Eddy Peelman (BEL)
14	13 May	Torrelavega to Burgos	192 km (119 mi)		Wilfried David (BEL)
15	14 May	Burgos to Segovia	188 km (117 mi)		Cyrille Guimard (FRA)
16	15 May	Segovia to Ávila	114 km (71 mi)		Joop Zoetemelk (NED)
17a	16 May	Ávila to Madrid	138 km (86 mi)		Willy Scheers (BEL)
17b	16 May	Madrid to Madrid	5.3 km (3 mi)	Individual time trial	René Pijnen (NED)
	Total		2,892 km (1,797 mi)		

== Results ==
=== Final General Classification ===
Rank	Rider	Team	Time
1	(Belgium) Ferdinand Bracke	Peugeot–BP–Michelin	73h 50' 05"
2	(Belgium) Wilfried David	Peugeot–BP–Michelin	+ 59"
3	(Spain) Luis Ocaña	Bic	+ 1' 51"
4	(Spain) Miguel María Lasa	Orbea	+ 2' 18"
5	(Spain) Manuel Galera Magdelano	Karpy	+ 2' 37"
6	(Netherlands) Joop Zoetemelk	Mars–Flandria	+ 2' 48"
7	(Spain) Agustín Tamames	Werner	+ 5' 15"
8	(Spain) Antonio Martos Aguilar	Werner	+ 5' 45"
9	(France) Raymond Poulidor	Fagor–Mercier	+ 6' 01"
10	(Spain) Luis Balagué Carreño	Werner	+ 6' 17"
11	(Luxembourg) Edy Schütz	Mars–Flandria	
12	(France) Cyrille Guimard	Fagor–Mercier	
13	(Spain) Eufronio Enrique Santos	La Casera	
14	(Spain) Antonio Menéndez	La Casera	
15	(Netherlands) Wim Schepers	Goudsmit	
16	(Spain) Domingo Perurena Tellechea	Kas–Kaskol	
17	(France) Bernard Labourdette	Bic	
18	(Spain) Ventura Díaz Arrey	Werner	
19	(Spain) Gonzalo Aja Barguin	Karpy	
20	(Germany) Rolf Wolfshohl	Fagor–Mercier	
21	(Spain) Antonio Gómez del Moral	Karpy	
22	(Spain) Andrés Oliva Sánchez	La Casera	
23	(Spain) Eduardo Castelló Villanova	Karpy	
24	(Spain) José Gómez	Werner	
25	(Spain) José Luis Abilleira	La Casera	
