= 1973 Vuelta a España =

Race details
- Dates: 26 April – 13 May
- Stages: 17 stages + Prologue, including 4 split stages
- Distance: 3,061.8 km (1,903 mi)
- Winning time: 84h 40' 50"

Results
Jersey awarded to the overall winner	Winner	Eddy Merckx (BEL)	(Molteni)
	Second	Luis Ocaña (ESP)	(Bic)
	Third	Bernard Thévenet (FRA)	(Peugeot-B.P.)
Jersey awarded to the points classification winner	Points	Eddy Merckx (BEL)	(Molteni)
	Mountains	José Luis Abilleira (ESP)	(La Casera)
Jersey awarded to the combination classification winner	Combination	Eddy Merckx (BEL)	(Molteni)
	Sprints	Eddy Merckx (BEL)	(Molteni)
	Team	La Casera	

The 28th Edition Vuelta a España (Tour of Spain), a long-distance bicycle stage race and one of the 3 grand tours, was held from April 26 to May 13, 1973. It consisted of 17 stages covering a total of 3,061 km, and was won by Eddy Merckx of the Molteni cycling team. As Merckx had already won several editions of the Tour de France and the Giro d'Italia with his win in the Vuelta, he became the third cyclist after Jacques Anquetil and Felice Gimondi to win all three grand tours in his career. Merckx went on to win the 1973 Giro d'Italia and became the first cyclist to win the Vuelta-Giro double. Merckx also won the points classification and José Luis Abilleira won the mountains classification. With Merckx finishing first, Ocaña second and Thévenet third the podium of the 1973 Vuelta contained one previous winner and two future winners of the Tour de France making it one of the best podiums in the history of the race, according to the official race website. Merckx won six stages in this edition and Gerben Karstens won four.

== Teams ==
A total of eight teams were invited to participate in the 1973 Vuelta a España. Each team sent a squad of ten riders, which meant that the race started with a peloton of 80 cyclists. 62 cyclists reached the finish in San Sebastián.

The teams entering the race were:

- KAS
- Bic
- La Casera
- Molteni
- Peugeot-B.P.
- Coelima-Benfica
- Monte Verde
- Rokado

== Route and stages ==
Stage characteristics and results
Stage	Date	Course	Distance	Type	Winner
P	26 April	Calp to Calp	5 km (3 mi)	Individual time trial	Eddy Merckx (BEL)
1	27 April	Calp to Murcia	187 km (116 mi)		Pieter Nassen (BEL)
2	28 April	Murcia to Albacete	156 km (97 mi)		Gerben Karstens (NED)
3	29 April	Albacete to Alcázar de San Juan	146 km (91 mi)		Pieter Nassen (BEL)
4	30 April	Alcázar de San Juan to Cuenca	169 km (105 mi)		Jos Deschoenmaecker (BEL)
5	1 May	Cuenca to Teruel	191 km (119 mi)		Gerben Karstens (NED)
6a	2 May	Teruel to La Pobla de Farnals	150 km (93 mi)		Roger Swerts (BEL)
6b	2 May	La Pobla de Farnals	5 km (3 mi)	Team time trial	Molteni
7	3 May	La Pobla de Farnals to Castellón de la Plana	165 km (103 mi)		Gerben Karstens (NED)
8	4 May	Castellón de la Plana to Calafell	245 km (152 mi)		Eddy Merckx (BEL)
9a	5 May	Calafell to Barcelona	80 km (50 mi)		Juan Manuel Santisteban (ESP)
9b	5 May	Barcelona to Barcelona	37.9 km (24 mi)	Individual time trial	Jacques Esclassan (FRA)
10	6 May	Barcelona to Empuriabrava	171 km (106 mi)		Eddy Merckx (BEL)
11	7 May	Empuriabrava to Manresa	225 km (140 mi)		Bernard Thévenet (FRA)
12	8 May	Manresa to Zaragoza	259 km (161 mi)		Gerben Karstens (NED)
13	9 May	Mallén to Irache	175 km (109 mi)		Domingo Perurena (ESP)
14	10 May	Irache to Bilbao	182 km (113 mi)		Juan Zurano (ESP)
15a	11 May	Bilbao to Torrelavega	154 km (96 mi)		Eddy Peelman (BEL)
15b	11 May	Torrelavega to Torrelavega	17.4 km (11 mi)	Individual time trial	Eddy Merckx (BEL)
16	12 May	Torrelavega to Miranda de Ebro	203 km (126 mi)		Eddy Merckx (BEL)
17a	13 May	Miranda de Ebro to Tolosa, Gipuzkoa	127 km (79 mi)		Eddy Peelman (BEL)
17b	13 May	Hernani to San Sebastián	10.5 km (7 mi)	Individual time trial	Eddy Merckx (BEL)
	Total		3,016.8 km (1,875 mi)		

== Classification leadership ==
Four different jerseys were worn during the 1973 Vuelta a España. The leader of the general classification – calculated by adding the stage finish times of each rider, and allowing time bonuses for the first three finishers on mass-start stages – wore a golden jersey. This classification is the most important of the race, and its winner is considered as the winner of the Vuelta.

For the points classification, which awarded a light blue jersey to its leader, cyclists were given points for finishing a stage in the top 15; additional points could also be won in intermediate sprints. The green jersey was awarded to the mountains classification leader. In this ranking, points were won by reaching the summit of a climb ahead of other cyclists. Each climb was ranked as either first, second or third category, with more points available for higher category climbs. The combination classification awarded a red jersey to its leader.

Although no jersey was awarded, there was also one classification for the teams, in which the stage finish times of the best three cyclists per team were added; the leading team was the one with the lowest total time.

The rows in the following table correspond to the jerseys awarded after that stage was run.

Classification leadership by stage
Stage	Winner	General classification	Points classification	Mountains classification	Combination classification	Team classification
P	Eddy Merckx	Eddy Merckx	not awarded	not awarded	not awarded	not awarded
1	Pieter Nassen	Eddy Merckx	Pieter Nassen	Domingo Perurena	not awarded	Rokado
2	Gerben Karstens	Gerben Karstens	Gerben Karstens	Domingo Perurena	Javier Elorriaga & Jean-Jacques Fussien	Rokado
3	Pieter Nassen	Gerben Karstens	Pieter Nassen	José Luis Abilleira	Jean-Jacques Fussien	Rokado
4	Jos Deschoenmaecker	José Pesarrodona	Pieter Nassen	José Luis Abilleira	Jean-Jacques Fussien	KAS
5	Gerben Karstens	José Pesarrodona	Gerben Karstens	José Luis Abilleira	Jean-Jacques Fussien	KAS
6a	Roger Swerts	José Pesarrodona	Gerben Karstens	José Luis Abilleira	José Luis Galdamez	Molteni
6b	Molteni	José Pesarrodona	Gerben Karstens	José Luis Abilleira	José Luis Galdamez	Molteni
7	Gerben Karstens	José Pesarrodona	Gerben Karstens	José Luis Abilleira	Eddy Merckx	Molteni
8	Eddy Merckx	José Pesarrodona	Gerben Karstens	José Luis Abilleira	Eddy Merckx	Molteni
9a	Juan Manuel Santisteban	José Pesarrodona	Gerben Karstens	José Luis Abilleira	Eddy Merckx	Molteni
9b	Jacques Esclassan	José Pesarrodona	Gerben Karstens	José Luis Abilleira	Eddy Merckx	Molteni
10	Eddy Merckx	José Pesarrodona	Gerben Karstens	José Luis Abilleira	Eddy Merckx	Molteni
11	Bernard Thévenet	Eddy Merckx	Gerben Karstens	José Luis Abilleira	Eddy Merckx	La Casera
12	Gerben Karstens	Eddy Merckx	Gerben Karstens	José Luis Abilleira	Eddy Merckx	La Casera
13	Domingo Perurena	Eddy Merckx	Gerben Karstens	José Luis Abilleira	Eddy Merckx	La Casera
14	Juan Zurano	Eddy Merckx	Gerben Karstens	José Luis Abilleira	Eddy Merckx	La Casera
15a	Eddy Peelman	Eddy Merckx	Eddy Merckx	José Luis Abilleira	Eddy Merckx	La Casera
15b	Eddy Merckx	Eddy Merckx	Eddy Merckx	José Luis Abilleira	Eddy Merckx	La Casera
16	Eddy Merckx	Eddy Merckx	Eddy Merckx	José Luis Abilleira	Eddy Merckx	La Casera
17a	Eddy Peelman	Eddy Merckx	Eddy Merckx	José Luis Abilleira	Eddy Merckx	La Casera
17b	Eddy Merckx	Eddy Merckx	Eddy Merckx	José Luis Abilleira	Eddy Merckx	La Casera
Final		Eddy Merckx	Eddy Merckx	José Luis Abilleira	Eddy Merckx	La Casera

== Final standings ==
Legend
A gold jersey	Denotes the winner of the General classification	A green jersey	Denotes the winner of the Mountains classification
A light blue jersey	Denotes the winner of the Points classification	A red jersey	Denotes the winner of the Combination classification

=== General Classification ===
Final general classification (1–10)
Rank	Name	Team	Time
1	Eddy Merckx (BEL)	Molteni	84h 40' 50"
2	Luis Ocaña (ESP)	Bic	+ 3' 46"
3	Bernard Thévenet (FRA)	Peugeot-B.P.	+ 4' 16"
4	José Pesarrodona (ESP)	KAS	+ 5' 54"
5	Pedro Torres (ESP)	La Casera	+ 7' 29"
6	Joaquim Agostinho (POR)	Bic	+ 8' 15"
7	Agustín Tamames (ESP)	La Casera	+ 9' 15"
8	Luis Balagué (ESP)	La Casera	+ 12' 26"
9	Roger Swerts (BEL)	Molteni	+ 13' 27"
10	Jesús Manzaneque (ESP)	La Casera	+ 15' 01"

=== Points classification ===
Final points classification (1–3)
	Rider	Team	Points
1	Eddy Merckx (BEL)	Molteni	215.5
2	Roger Swerts (BEL)	Molteni	162.5
3	Pieter Nassen (BEL)	Rokado	154.5

=== Mountains classification ===
Final mountains classification (1–4)
	Rider	Team	Points
1	José Luis Abilleira (ESP)	La Casera	97
2	Eddy Merckx (BEL)	Molteni	83
3	Luis Balagué (ESP)	La Casera	60
4	Pedro Torres (ESP)	La Casera	50

=== Combination classification ===
Final combination classification (1–3)
	Rider	Team	Points
1	Eddy Merckx (BEL)	Molteni	18
2	José Luis Abilleira (ESP)	La Casera	11
3	José Luis Galdamez (ESP)	Coelima-Benfica	6

=== Team classification ===
Final team classification (1–8)
	Team	Time
1	La Casera	254h 01' 59"
2	Bic	+ 4' 44"
3	Molteni	+ 6' 24"
4	KAS	+ 11' 28"
5	Monte Verde	+ 29' 01"
6	Coelima-Benfica	+ 32' 03"
7	Peugeot-B.P.	+ 32' 51"
8	Rokado	+ 51' 22"

=== Intermediate sprints classification ===
Final intermediate sprints classification (1–10)
	Rider	Team	Points
1	Eddy Merckx (BEL)	Molteni	26
2	Javier Elorriaga (ESP)	KAS	24
3	José Luis Galdamez (ESP)	Coelima-Benfica	15
4	Fernando Mendes (POR)	Coelima-Benfica	10
5	Eddy Peelman (BEL)	Rokado	9
6	José Luis Abilleira (ESP)	La Casera	6
7	Domingo Perurena (ESP)	KAS	6
8	Jan Van de Wiele (BEL)	Rokado	6
9	Joseph Bruyère (BEL)	Molteni	5
10	Roger Swerts (BEL)	Molteni	5
