= Vignolini =

Vignolini is a surname. Notable people with the surname include:

- Loris Vignolini (born 1947), Italian racing cyclist
- Silvia Vignolini (born 1981), Italian physicist
