= 1970 Critérium du Dauphiné Libéré =

Race details
- Dates: 19–25 May 1970
- Stages: 6 + Prologue
- Distance: 1,274 km (792 mi)
- Winning time: 32h 11' 08"

Results
	Winner	Luis Ocaña (ESP)	(Bic)
	Second	Roger Pingeon (FRA)	(Peugeot–BP–Michelin)
	Third	Herman Van Springel (BEL)	(Dr. Mann–Grundig)
Jersey awarded to the points classification winner	Points	Roger De Vlaeminck (BEL)	(Flandria–Mars)
Jersey awarded to the mountains classification winner	Mountains	Jean-Claude Genty (FRA)	(Bic)
	Team	Bic	

The 1970 Critérium du Dauphiné Libéré, also known as the 1970 Criterium of the Six Provinces, was the 22nd edition of the cycle race and was held from 19 May to 25 May 1970. The race started in Terrenoire and finished in Avignon. The race was won by Luis Ocaña of the Bic team.

== Teams ==
Ten teams, containing a total of 99 riders, participated in the race:

- Batavus–Alcina–Continental
- Bic
- Laurens–Caballero
- Fagor–Mercier–Hutchinson
- Frimatic–de Gribaldy
- Dr. Mann–Grundig
- Flandria–Mars
- Peugeot–BP–Michelin
- Sonolor–Lejeune
- Willem II–Gazelle

== Route ==
Stage characteristics and winners
Stage	Date	Course	Distance	Type	Winner
P	19 May	Terrenoire to Rochetaillée	5 km (3.1 mi)	Individual time trial	Raymond Delisle (FRA)
1	20 May	Roanne to Chalon-sur-Saône	225 km (140 mi)		Daniel Van Ryckeghem (BEL)
2a	21 May	Chalon-sur-Saône to Lons-le-Saunier	62 km (39 mi)		Wim Schepers (NED)
2b	21 May	Lons-le-Saunier to Lyon	143 km (89 mi)		Wim Schepers (NED)
3	22 May	Lyon to Sallanches	237 km (147 mi)		Roger De Vlaeminck (BEL)
4	23 May	Sallanches to Grenoble	192 km (119 mi)		Jean-Claude Genty (FRA)
5a	24 May	Grenoble to Privas	146 km (91 mi)		Jaak De Boever (BEL)
5b	24 May	Privas to Vals-les-Bains	34 km (21 mi)	Individual time trial	Luis Ocaña (ESP)
6a	25 May	Aubenas to Cairanne	125 km (78 mi)		Georges Pintens (BEL)
6b	25 May	Cairanne to Avignon	105 km (65 mi)		Gerard Vianen (NED)

== General classification ==
Final general classification

Rank	Rider	Team	Time
1	Luis Ocaña (ESP)	Bic	32h 11' 08"
2	Roger Pingeon (FRA)	Peugeot–BP–Michelin	+ 1' 36"
3	Herman Van Springel (BEL)	Dr. Mann–Grundig	+ 2' 06"
4	Roger De Vlaeminck (BEL)	Flandria–Mars	+ 2' 43"
5	Raymond Delisle (FRA)	Peugeot–BP–Michelin	+ 3' 47"
6	Georges Pintens (BEL)	Dr. Mann–Grundig	+ 4' 08"
7	Joop Zoetemelk (NED)	Flandria–Mars	+ 4' 29"
8	Willy Van Neste (BEL)	Dr. Mann–Grundig	+ 5' 12"
9	Jan Janssen (NED)	Bic	+ 5' 46"
10	Désiré Letort (FRA)	Peugeot–BP–Michelin	+ 6' 43"
