= Adrie Wouters =

Dutch cyclist

Personal information
- Born: 20 November 1946 (age 79) Zundert, Netherlands

Cycling career
- Sport: Cycling
- Discipline: Road
- Role: Rider

Professional team
- 1970: Caballero–Laurens

Adrie Wouters (born 20 November 1946) is a Dutch racing cyclist. He rode in the 1970 Tour de France.
