= Etienne Antheunis =

Belgian cyclist

Personal information
- Born: 15 June 1947 (age 79) Lokeren, Belgium

Cycling career
- Sport: Cycling
- Role: Rider

Etienne Antheunis (born 15 June 1947) is a Belgian racing cyclist. He rode in the 1970 Tour de France.
