= Paolo Zini =

Italian cyclist

Personal information
- Born: 25 May 1948 (age 78) San Lazzaro di Parma, Italy

Cycling career
- Sport: Cycling
- Role: Rider

Paolo Zini (born 25 May 1948) is an Italian racing cyclist. He rode in the 1970 Tour de France. In 1968 he won the Coppa Collecchio.
