= Ernesto Jotti =

Italian cyclist

Personal information
- Born: 5 March 1944 (age 82)

Cycling career
- Sport: Cycling
- Role: Rider

Ernesto Jotti (born 5 March 1944) is an Italian racing cyclist. He rode in the 1970 Tour de France. In 1967 he won the Coppa Collecchio.
