= Eraldo Bocci =

Italian cyclist

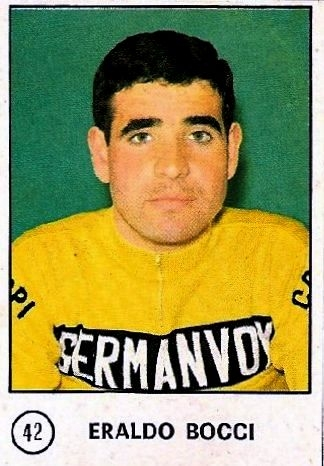

Personal information
- Born: 24 August 1942 (age 84)

Cycling career
- Sport: Cycling
- Role: Rider

Eraldo Bocci (born 24 August 1942) is an Italian racing cyclist. He rode in the 1970 Tour de France.
