= Gérard David =

Belgian cyclist

Personal information
- Born: 9 December 1944 (age 81)

Cycling career
- Sport: Cycling
- Role: Rider

Gérard David (born 9 December 1944) is a Belgian racing cyclist. He rode in the 1970 Tour de France.
