= Karl-Heinz Muddemann =

German cyclist

Personal information
- Born: 15 January 1950 (age 76)

Cycling career
- Sport: Cycling
- Role: Rider

Karl-Heinz Muddemann (born 15 January 1950) is a German racing cyclist. He rode in the 1972 Tour de France.
