= Jean-Pierre Paranteau =

French cyclist (1944–2024)

Personal information
- Born: 5 August 1944 Angoulême, German-occupied France
- Died: 27 October 2024 (aged 80)

Cycling career
- Sport: Cycling

Jean-Pierre Paranteau (5 August 1944 – 27 October 2024) was a French cyclist. He competed in the individual road race at the 1968 Summer Olympics.

Paranteau died on 27 October 2024, at the age of 80.
