= Wim Schepers =

Dutch cyclist

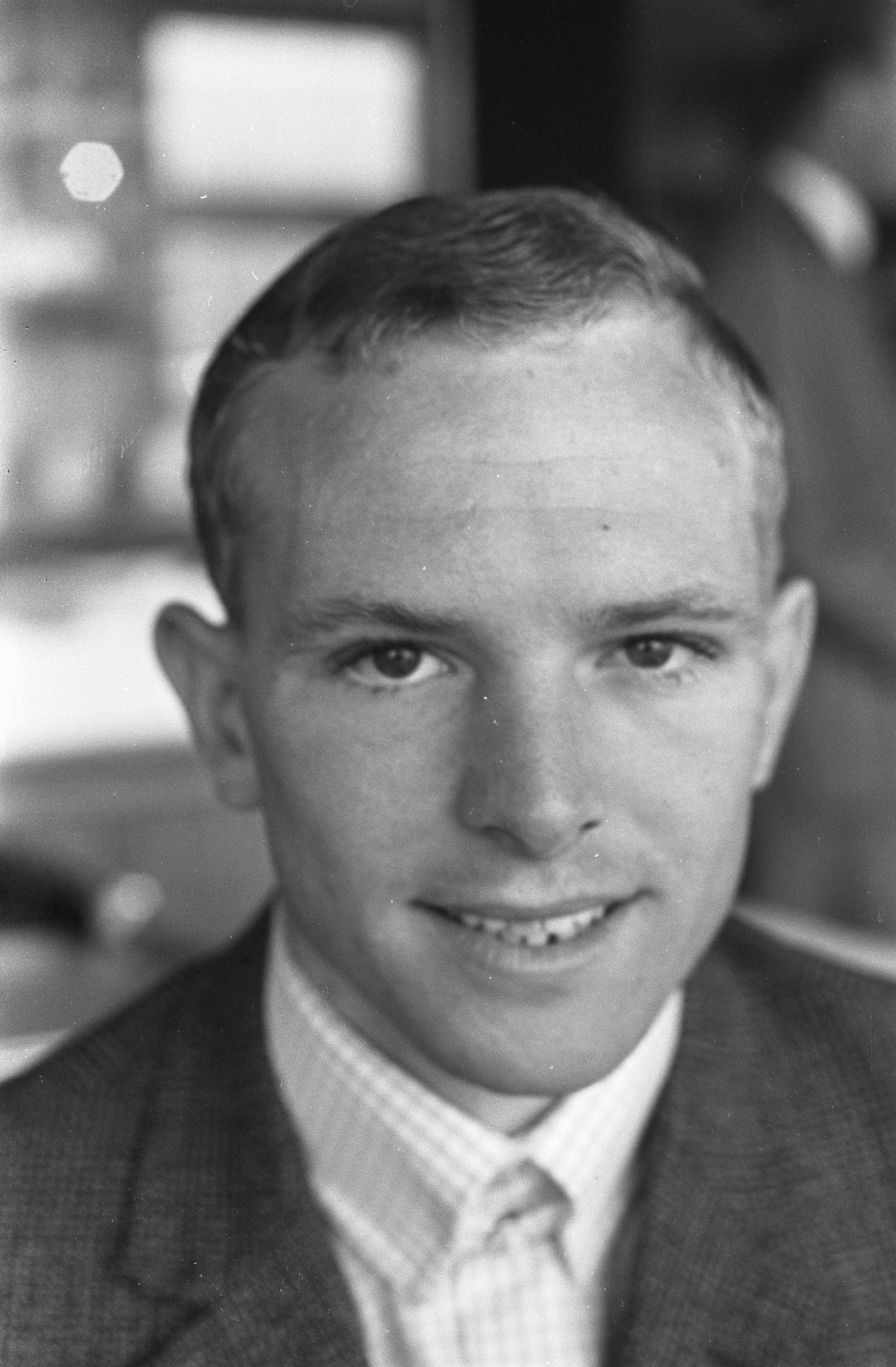
- Wim Schepers during the 1967 Tour de France.

Personal information
- Born: 25 September 1943 Stein, Netherlands
- Died: 25 September 1998 (aged 55) Meers, Stein, Netherlands

Cycling career
- Sport: Cycling
- Discipline: Road
- Role: Rider

Professional teams
- 1966–1971: Caballero
- 1972–1973: Rokado–Colders
- 1974–1975: MIC–Ludo–de Gribaldy

Wim Schepers (25 September 1943 – 25 September 1998) was a Dutch professional road cyclist. A professional from 1966 to 1975, he won two stages of the 1970 Critérium du Dauphiné Libéré and finished second in the 1972 Liège–Bastogne–Liège to Eddy Merckx.

After the final stage of the 1971 Vuelta a España, Schepers was ranked in second place, 19 seconds behind Ferdinand Bracke, but he was given a ten-minute time penalty for a doping offence, and dropped to 15th.

== Major results ==
1965
1st Stages 1 & 6 Tour of Austria
1966
1st Manx Trophy
4th Overall Tour de Luxembourg
1967
3rd National Road Race Championships
4th Amstel Gold Race
1968
4th Rund um den Henninger Turm
5th Amstel Gold Race
6th Liège–Bastogne–Liège
9th Overall Tour of Belgium
1969
1st Omloop Mandel-Leie-Schelde
2nd Overall Tour of Belgium
1970
1st Stages 2a & 2b Critérium du Dauphiné Libéré
1st Stage 4 Four Days of Dunkirk
5th Rund um den Henninger Turm
10th Amstel Gold Race
1971
10th Overall Tour of Belgium
1972
2nd Liège–Bastogne–Liège
4th Rund um den Henninger Turm
8th La Flèche Wallonne
9th Gent–Wevelgem
1973
4th Rund um den Henninger Turm
10th Züri-Metzgete
