= Loris Vignolini =

Italian cyclist

Personal information
- Born: 8 December 1947 (age 78)

Cycling career
- Sport: Cycling
- Role: Rider

Loris Vignolini (born 8 December 1947) is an Italian racing cyclist. He rode in the 1970 Tour de France.
