= Jacques Esclassan =

French cyclist (born 1948)

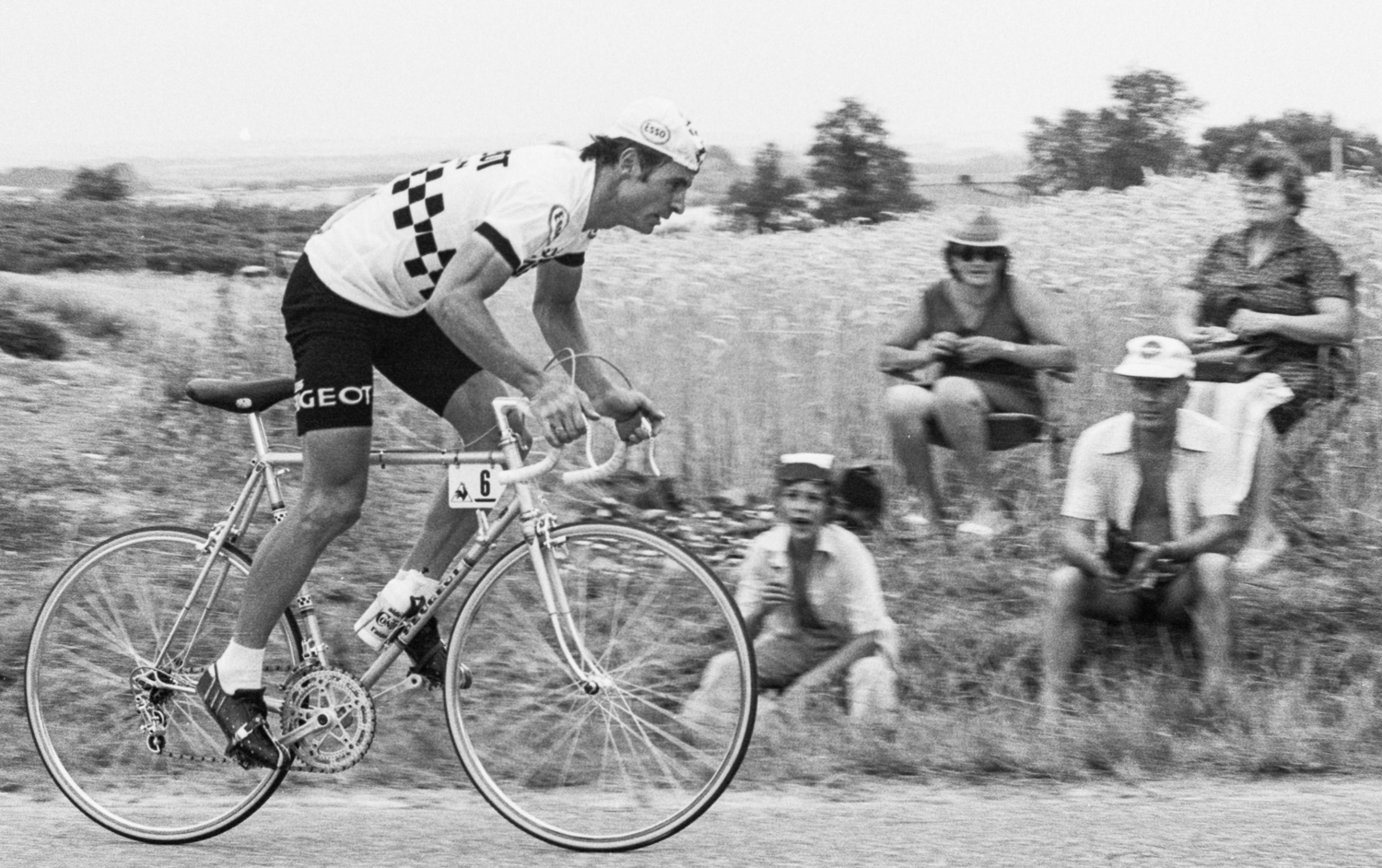

Personal information
- Full name: Jacques Esclassan
- Born: 3 September 1948 (age 78) Castres, France

Cycling career
- Sport: Cycling
- Current team: Retired
- Discipline: Road
- Role: Rider
- Rider type: Sprinter

Professional team
- 1972–1979: Peugeot

Major wins
- Grand Tours Tour de France Points classification (1977) 5 individual stages (1975, 1976, 1977, 1978) Vuelta a España 1 individual stage (1973)

Jacques Esclassan (born 3 September 1948) is a French former road bicycle racer who won the green jersey in the 1977 Tour de France. He also won five stages in Tour de France and a stage in Vuelta a España.

== Major results ==
1972
Paris - Troyes
1973
Rodez
Vuelta a España:

Winner stage 9B

1974
Alès
Étoile de Bessèges
Périgueux
1975
Bain-de-Bretagne
Critérium International
Méréville
Quilan
Ronde d'Aix-en-Provence
Castres
Saclas-Mereville
Tour de France:

Winner stage 4

1976
Dunières
Ronde de Seignelay
Ambarès
Tour de France:

Winner stage 8

1977
Bagneux
Ile-sur-Tet
Castres
Tour de France:

Winner points classification
Winner stage 5A

1978
Auzances
La Palmyre
Oradour-sur-Glane
Quilan
Ronde d'Aix-en-Provence
Saint-Claud
Tour de France:

Winner stages 2 and 12B

GP de Peymeinade
1979
GP Monaco
