= Pieter Nassen =

Belgian cyclist

Personal information
- Born: 16 January 1944 (age 82) Riemst, Belgium

Cycling career
- Sport: Cycling
- Current team: Retired
- Discipline: Road
- Role: Rider
- Rider type: Sprinter

Professional teams
- 1967: Okay Whisky–Diamant–De Torrens
- 1967–1971: Flandria–De Clerck
- 1972: Watney–Avia
- 1973: Rokado–Colders
- 1974: Robot–Gazelle
- 1975: Splendor–Struvay

Pieter Nassen (born 16 January 1944) is a Belgian racing cyclist. He rode 5 editions of the Tour de France, and won the intermediate sprints classification in 1971. He also won three stages of the Vuelta a España.

== Major results ==
1970
2nd Nationale Sluitingprijs
3rd Flèche Hesbignonne
1971
1st Intermediate sprints classification Tour de France
1972
1st Stage 5 Vuelta a España
1973
1st Stages 1 & 3 Vuelta a España
