= Manuel Galera =

Spanish cyclist

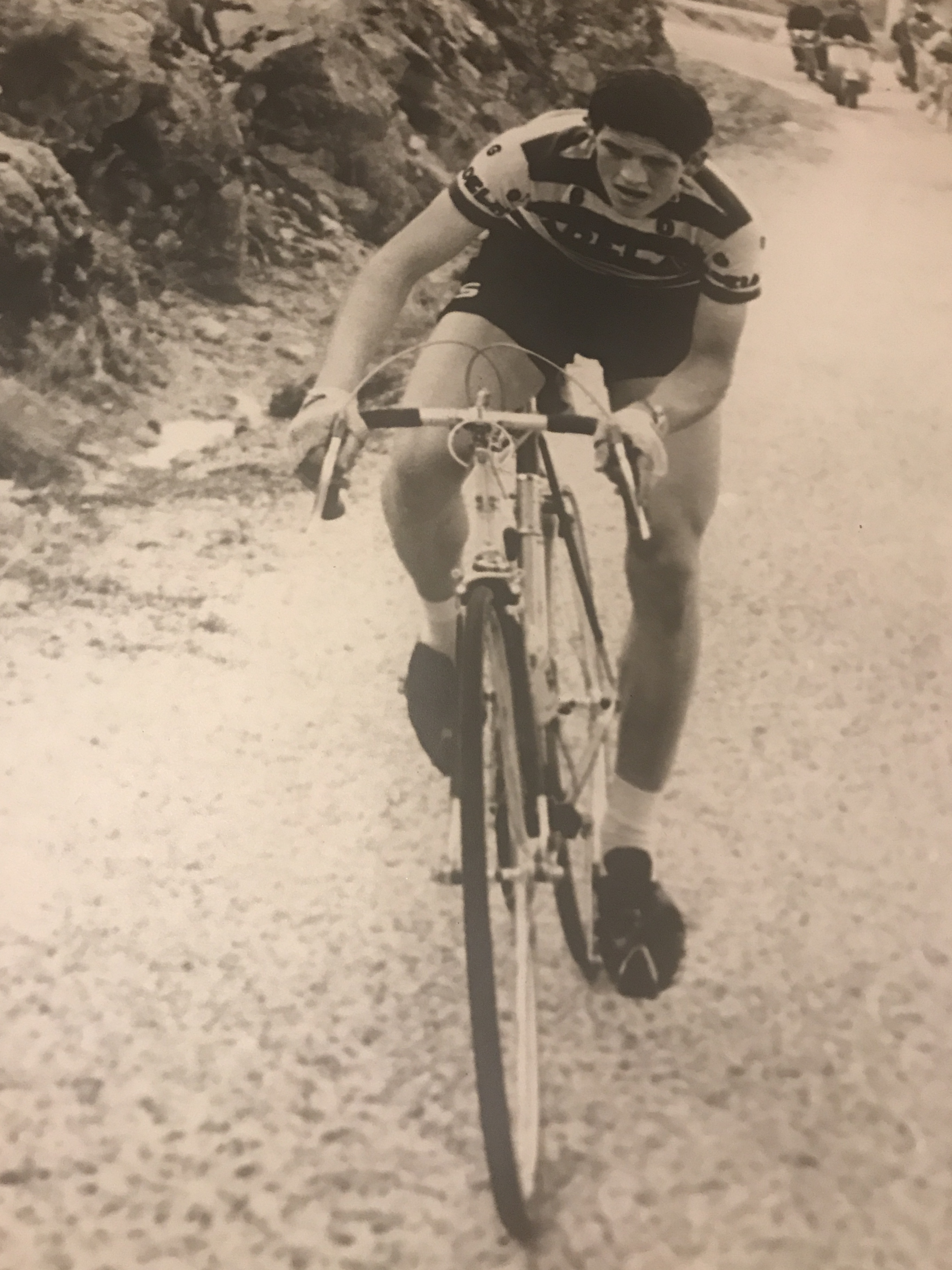

Personal information
- Full name: Manuel Galera Magdaleno
- Born: 3 December 1943 Armilla, Andalucia
- Died: 14 February 1972 (aged 28) Cabra, Andalucia

Cycling career
- Sport: Cycling
- Role: Rider

Manuel Galera (3 December 1943 – 14 February 1972) was a Spanish racing cyclist. He rode in the 1969 Tour de France. He died as a result of a tragic accident while he was competing in the 1972 Vuelta a Andalucía, on the Puerto del Mojón in the municipality of Cabra. In his memory, for years the professional cycling race Memorial Manuel Galera was organized in his home region of Granada. His older brother Joaquín also competed as a cyclist professionally.
