= Jos Deschoenmaecker =

Belgian cyclist

Jos De Schoenmaecker
Personal information
- Full name: Jozef De Schoenmaecker
- Born: 2 October 1947 (age 79) Mechelen, Belgium

Cycling career
- Sport: Cycling
- Current team: Retired
- Discipline: Road
- Role: Rider

Jozef "Jos" De Schoenmaecker (born 2 October 1947, in Mechelen) is a former Belgian professional road bicycle racer. He was Eddy Merckx's teammate from 1971 to 1978.

== Major results ==
1967
Tour de Namur
1968
Tour de Namur
1970
Omloop der Zennevalei
1971
Omloop Hageland-Zuiderkempen
Onze-Lieve-Vrouw Waver
1972
Rijmenam
1973
Vuelta a España:

Winner stages 4 and 6B

Oostduinkerke
1976
Flèche Rebecquoise
1980
Koersel
Tour de France:

Winner stage 16
