= Wilfried David =

Belgian cyclist

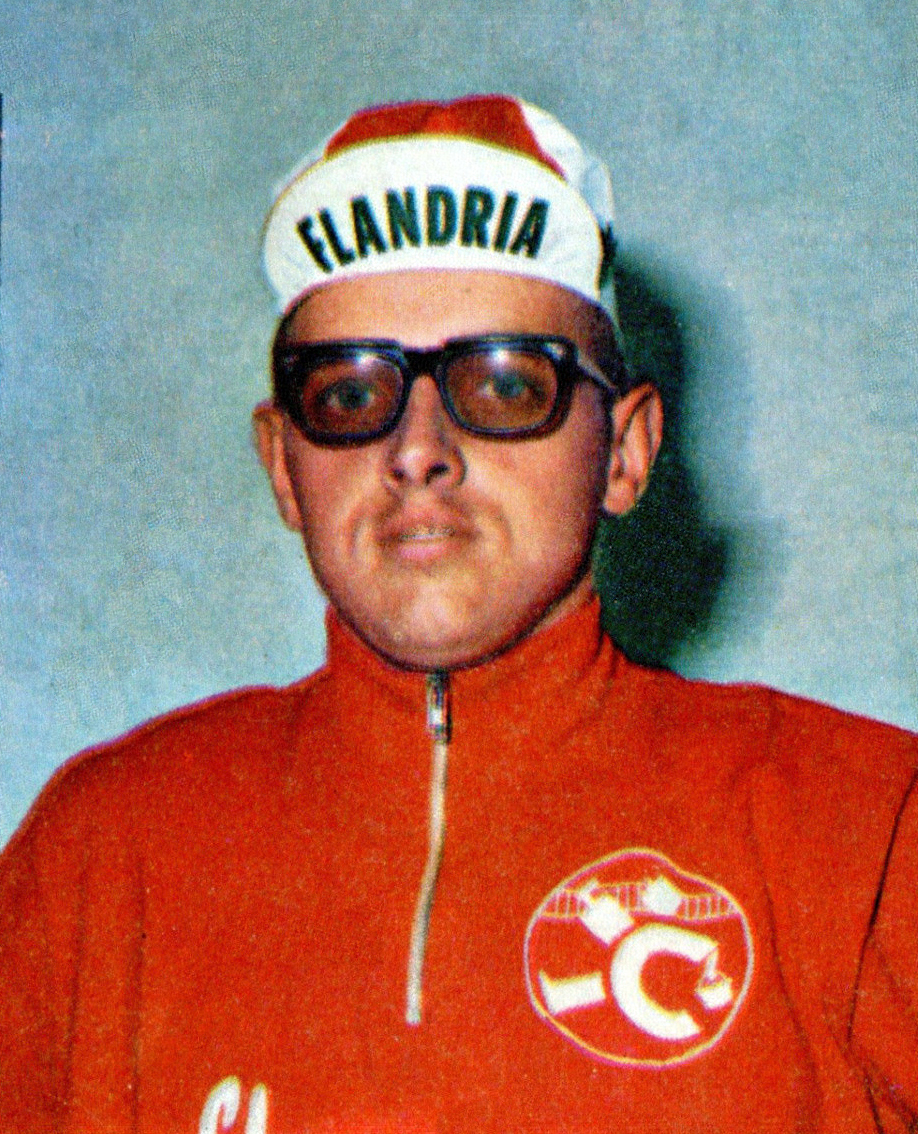
- Wilfried David in 1968

Personal information
- Full name: Wilfried David
- Born: 22 April 1946 Bruges, Belgium
- Died: 15 June 2015 (aged 69) Wingene, West Flanders, Belgium

Cycling career
- Sport: Cycling
- Current team: Retired
- Discipline: Road
- Role: Rider

Professional teams
- 1968–1970: Flandria
- 1971–1972: Peugeot
- 1973–1975: Flandria
- 1976: IJsboerke

Major wins
- Tour de Romandie (1973); Tour of Belgium (1968)

Wilfried David (22 April 1946 – 15 June 2015) was a Belgian professional road bicycle racer.

== Major results ==
1968
2nd, Houthulst
1st, Stage 7, Paris–Nice
1st, Overall, Tour of Belgium

2nd, Stage 1
3rd, Stage 2

1969
1st, Oostduinkerke
1st, Vichte

1970
1st, Mandel-Leie-Schelde

1971
2nd, Overall, Vuelta a España

1st, Stage 14

1972
1st, Stage 7, Tour de Suisse

1973
1st, Brussels-Ingooigem
1st, Stage 6a, Critérium du Dauphiné Libéré
1st, Overall, Tour de Romandie

2nd, Stage 1
3rd, Stage 2
2nd, Stage 3
1st, Stage 4b

Tour de France:

Winner stage 15

1976
1st, Stage 5, Tour Méditerranéen
2nd, Overall, Tour of Belgium

3rd, Stage 3
