= Frans Mintjens =

Belgian cyclist

Personal information
- Born: 23 November 1946 (age 79) Antwerp, Belgium

Cycling career
- Sport: Cycling

Frans Mintjens (born 23 November 1946) is a former Belgian cyclist. He competed in the team time trial at the 1968 Summer Olympics.
