= La Pobla de Farnals =

La Pobla de Farnals Puebla de Farnals
- Municipality
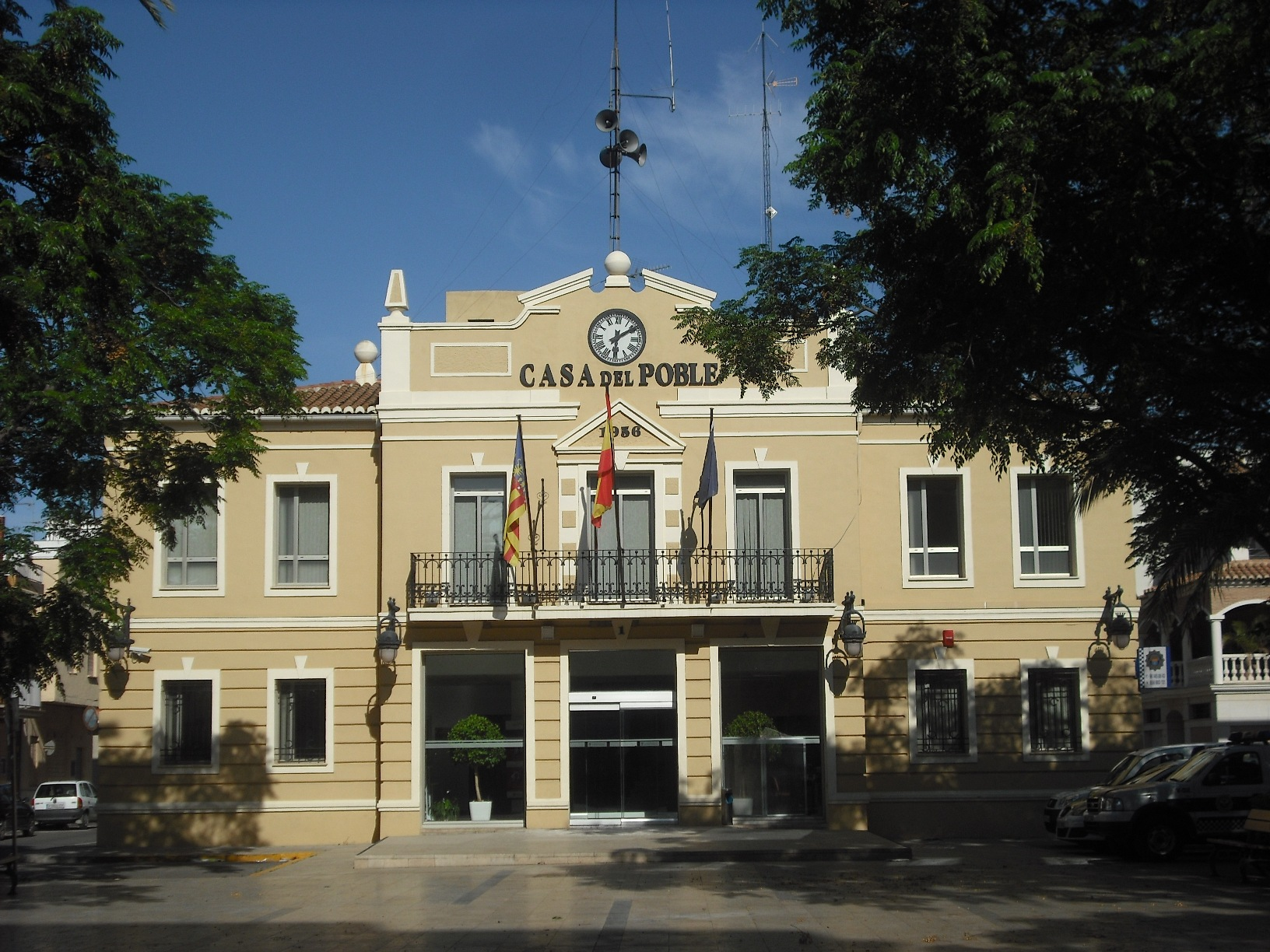
- Town hall

- Coat of arms

- Location in Spain
- Coordinates: 39°33′51.50″N 0°17′0.40″W
- Country: Spain
- Autonomous community: Valencian Community
- Province: Valencia
- Comarca: Horta Nord
- Judicial district: Massamagrell

Government
  - Alcalde: Enric Palanca Torres

Area
  - Total: 3.61 km^{2} (1.39 sq mi)
- Elevation: 4 m (13 ft)

Population (2022)
  - Total: 8,368
  - Density: 2,320/km^{2} (6,000/sq mi)
- Demonym(s): Creuetí, creuetina
- Time zone: UTC+1 (CET)
  - Summer (DST): UTC+2 (CEST)
- Postal code: 46139
- Official language(s): Valencian
- Website: Official website

La Pobla de Farnals (Valencian: [la ˈpɔbla ðe faɾˈnals], also [ˈpɔblɔ]; Spanish: Puebla de Farnals [ˈpweβla ðe faɾˈnals]) is a municipality in the comarca of Horta Nord in the Valencian Community, Spain.

The town's origins go back to the Middle Ages and it now has a population of about 8,368, much of which is the elderly.

== In the news ==
In September 2023, two men were injured in bull running festivities–one of the two later died in the hospital.

== See also ==
- List of municipalities in Valencia
