= Ferdinand Bracke =

Belgian cyclist (born 1939)

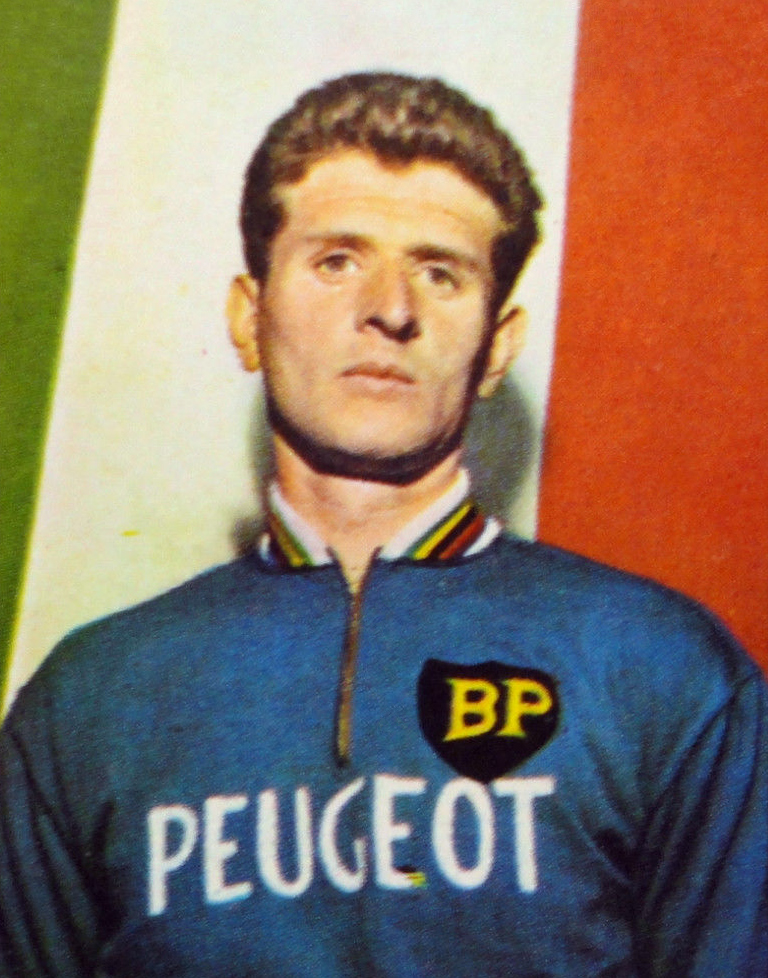

Personal information
- Full name: Ferdinand Bracke
- Born: 25 May 1939 (age 87) Hamme, Belgium

Cycling career
- Sport: Cycling
- Discipline: Road/Track
- Role: Rider

Professional teams
- 1962–1973: Peugeot–BP–Dunlop
- 1974: Maes Pils
- 1975: TI–Raleigh
- 1976–1977: Lejeune–BP
- 1978: Splendor

Major wins
- Grand Tours Tour de France 2 individual stages (1966, 1976) Vuelta a España General classification (1971) One-day races and Classics Grand Prix de Wallonie (1970) Grand Prix des Nations (1962) World Individual Pursuit Championships (1959) World Individual Pursuit Championships (1959) Other Hour Record 1967
Medal record
Representing Belgium
Men's road bicycle racing
World Championships
Gold medal – first place	1964 Paris	Track pursuit
Gold medal – first place	1969 Antwerp	Track pursuit
Silver medal – second place	1965 San Sebastián	Track pursuit
Silver medal – second place	1966 Frankfurt	Track pursuit
Silver medal – second place	1972 Marseille	Track pursuit
Silver medal – second place	1974 Montreal	Track pursuit
Bronze medal – third place	1973 San Sebastián	Track pursuit

Ferdinand Bracke (born 25 May 1939) is a Belgian former professional road and track cyclist who is most famous for holding the World Hour Record (48.093 km) and winning the overall title at the 1971 Vuelta a España ahead of Wilfried David of Belgium and Luis Ocaña of Spain. He also became world pursuit champion on the track in 1964 and 1969.

== Biography ==
Bracke was born in Hamme East Flanders, Belgium, on 25 May 1939. A rouleur and time trialist, he emerged as an amateur in 1962 by winning the tenth stage of the Peace Race. In May of the same year he won the Grand Prix des Nations, a time trial race. He turned pro on 26 September 1962, joining the Peugeot-BP-Dunlop team headed by Gaston Plaud.

In the following years he obtained numerous prestigious victories on the road: he won the Trofeo Baracchi, together with Eddy Merckx, in 1966 and 1967, a stage in the 1966 Tour de France and the final time trial of the 1976 Tour de France. He finished in third place in the general classification at the 1968 Tour de France. In 1971 he won the Vuelta a España, beating compatriot Wilfried David (who placed second) and Spaniard Luis Ocaña (who placed third).

He became world champion in track pursuit in 1964 in Paris and again in Antwerp in 1969, then finished second in 1972 and 1974 and placed third in 1973. On 30 October 1967 he recorded the hour record with 48,093 kilometers at the Olympic Velodrome in Rome, becoming the first cyclist to reach the milestone of 48 kilometers. The record, broken the following year by Ole Ritter, remained the best performance on track below 600 meters of altitude for a long time.

In 1978 he ended his cycling career and took over a furniture business with his wife. On 17 February 1979, Bracke bid farewell to cycling at a cycling gala in the Sports Palace in Ghent.

== Honours ==
In 1967 Bracke was voted Belgian Sportsman of the Year (the first in history to receive this award) and was awarded the Belgian Sports Merit Award.

== Major results ==
=== Road ===
1961
1st Overall Tour of Austria amateurs
1st Stages 1 & 2a (TTT) Etoile Hennuyère
1st Stage 2 Ronde van Limburg amateurs
1st Stage 2b (ITT)Tour de Wallonie
1962
1st Grand Prix des Nations (ITT)
1st Stage 10 Peace Race
2nd Grand Prix du Parisien
3rd Gran Premio di Lugano
1963
1st Grand Prix du Parisien
2nd Flèche Hesbignonne
2nd Manche-Océan
2nd Grand Prix des Nations
2nd Gran Premio di Lugano
3rd Trofeo Baracchi (with Walter Boucquet)
1964
1st Stage 2b Tour du Sud-Est
1st Stage 5b (TTT) Four Days of Dunkirk
1st Stage 4 Grand Prix du Midi Libre
1st Gran Premio di Lugano
2nd Tour de l'Oise
3rd Bruxelles-Verviers
3rd Omloop van West Brabant
1965
1st Tour de Haute-Loire
1st GP de la Basse-Sambre
1966
1st Trofeo Baracchi (with Eddy Merckx)
1st Stage 19 Tour de France
1st Stage 1b (ITT) Tour of Belgium
1st Stage 2b (TTT) Four Days of Dunkirk
2nd Escalada a Montjuïc
1967
1st Trofeo Baracchi (with Eddy Merckx)
3rd Interclubs road race, National Road Championships
1968
1st European Time Trial Cup (with Vittorio Adorni)
1st LuK Challenge Chrono (with Vittorio Adorni)
2nd National Road Championships
2nd Overall Paris-Nice

1st Stage 8b (ITT)

3rd Overall Tour de France
1969
1st Stage 2b (ITT) Four Days of Dunkirk
1st Stage 1c Critérium du Dauphiné
2nd Overall Grand Prix du Midi Libre

1st Stage 3

1970
1st Grand Prix de Wallonie
1st Stage 5b (ITT) Four Days of Dunkirk
1971
1st Overall Vuelta a España
1st Flèche Hesbignonne
2nd Overall Tour de Luxembourg
3rd Overall Tour of Belgium
1972
1st Stage 5 Étoile des Espoirs
1st Prologue (TTT) Critérium du Dauphiné
3rd Overall Four Days of Dunkirk
1973
1st Grand Prix Pino Cerami
1974
1st Grand Prix de Monaco
Tour de Picardie

1st stage 3

3rd Overall Tour of Belgium

1st stage 6

3rd Circuit de la Région Linière
2nd Le Samyn
1975
3rd GP de Wallonie
1976
1st Stage 17 Tour de France
1977
1st Bruxelles-Biévène
1978
2nd Bruxelles-Ingooigem
3rd Trofee Luc Van Biesen

=== Track ===
1964
1st Individual pursuit, UCI World Championships
3rd Individual pursuit, National Track Championships
1965
1st Individual pursuit, National Track Championships
2nd Individual pursuit, UCI World Championships
3rd Omnium, European Championships
1966
2nd Individual pursuit, UCI World Championships
1967
World Hour Record – 48.093km
1st Individual pursuit, National Track Championships
1st Six Days of Charleroi (with Patrick Sercu)
1968
1st Six Days of Charleroi (with Eddy Merckx)
2nd Omnium, National Track Championships
1969
1st Individual pursuit, UCI World Championships
3rd Six Days of Charleroi (with Rudi Altig)
1970
2nd Six Days of Brussels
3rd Omnium, National Track Championships
1971
2nd Six Days of Ghent (with Peter Post
3rd Six Days of Grenoble
3rd Six Days of Brussels
3rd Omnium, National Track Championships
1972
Belgian National Championships

1st Individual Pursuit
1st Derny

2nd Individual pursuit, UCI World Championships
1973
1st Individual pursuit, National Track Championships
1st Six Days of Montreal (with Robert Van Lancker)
3rd Individual pursuit, UCI World Championships
3rd Derny, European Championships
1974
2nd Individual pursuit, UCI World Championships
2nd Individual pursuit, National Track Championships
3rd Six Days of Herning (with Julien Stevens)
1975
Belgian National Championships

2nd Madison (with Willy Debosscher)
3rd Derny

1977
3rd Omnium, National Track Championships
1979
3rd Six Days of Antwerp (with Constant Tourné)

==== World record info ====
Discipline	Record	Date	Velodrome	Ref
Hour Record	48,093 km	30 October 1967	Velodromo Vigorelli, Milan (Italy)	

Records
Preceded by Roger Rivière	UCI hour record (48.093 km); 30 October 1967-10 October 1968	Succeeded by Ole Ritter
