= Eddy Peelman =

Belgian cyclist

Personal information
- Born: 8 August 1947 (age 79) Baasrode, Belgium

Cycling career
- Sport: Cycling
- Current team: Retired
- Discipline: Road
- Role: Rider

Professional teams
- 1968–1972: Mercier–BP–Hutchinson
- 1973: Rokado–De Gribaldy
- 1974: Bic
- 1975–1976: Super Ser
- 1977–1978: Zoppas

Eddy Peelman (born 8 August 1947, in Baasrode) is a Belgian former cyclist. During his career, he won nine stages of the Vuelta a España.

== Major results ==
1968
2nd Grand Prix d'Isbergues
1969
1st Stage 2 Tour de l'Oise
1970
1st Stages 1 & 6 Vuelta a España
1971
1st Stages 2, 6 & 13 Vuelta a España
1st Stage 3 Tour d'Indre-et-Loire
1972
1st Stage 7 Paris–Nice
8th Paris–Roubaix
1973
1st Stages 15 & 17 Vuelta a España
1st Prologue Tour of Belgium (TTT)
1st Stages 4 & 5 Volta a la Comunitat Valenciana
1st Stages 4 & 6 Setmana Catalana de Ciclisme
1974
1st Stages 1 & 6 Vuelta a España
1st Stage 4 Tour Méditerranéen
1st Stages 1, 4 & 6 Volta a la Comunitat Valenciana
1st Grand Prix de Valence
1st Stage 2 Tour de l'Aude
1975
1st Stage 4 Vuelta a Andalucía
1st Grand Prix de Valence
1st Stages 3 & 5 Volta a Catalunya
1st Stage 2 Vuelta a La Rioja
1976
1st Stage 5 Vuelta a Aragón
