= 1968 Tour de France, Stage 1a to Stage 10 =

Cycling race stages

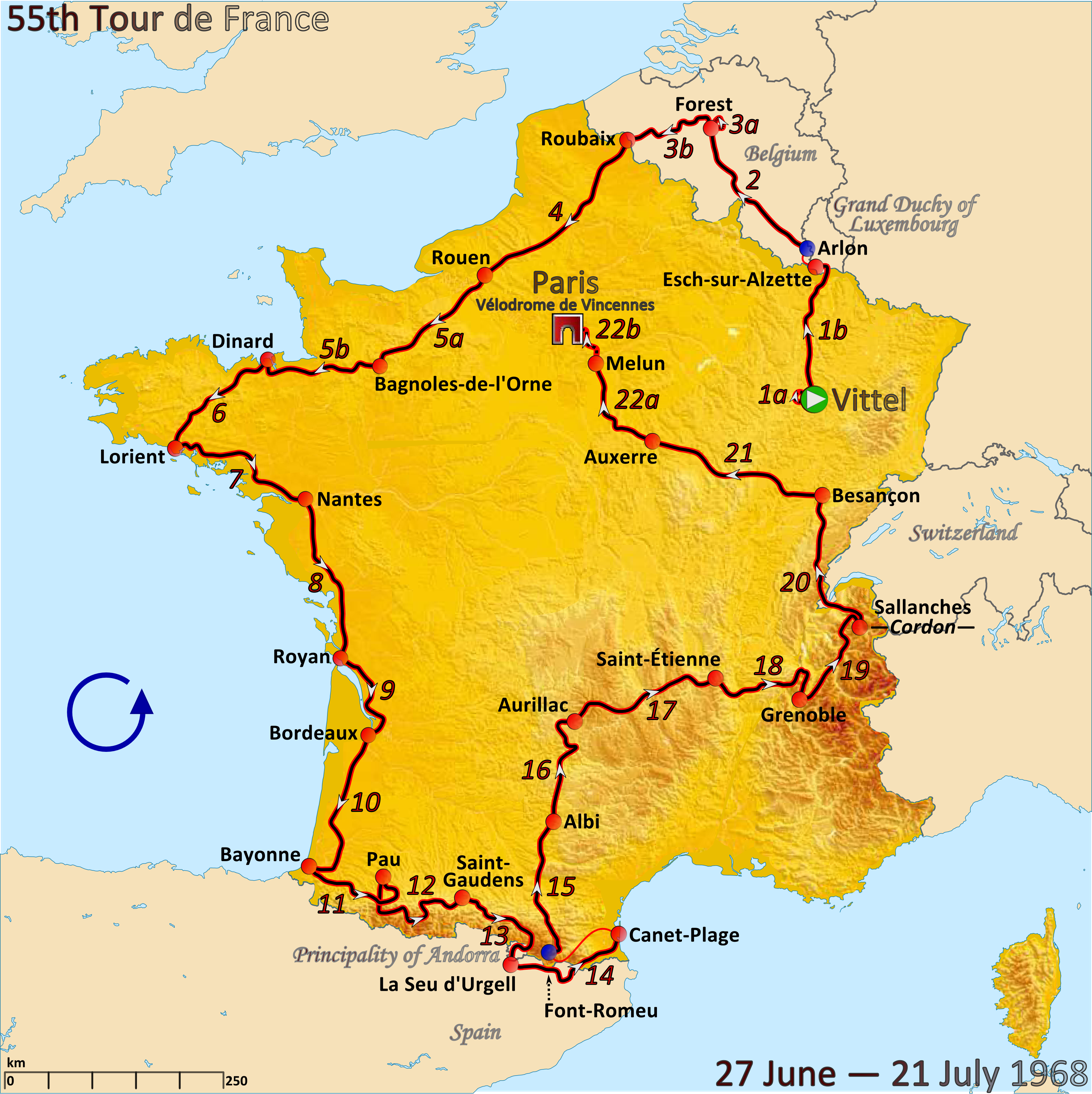
Route of the 1968 Tour de France

The 1968 Tour de France was the 55th edition of Tour de France, one of cycling's Grand Tours. The Tour began in Vittel with an individual time trial on 27 June and Stage 10 occurred on 8 July with a flat stage to Bayonne. The race finished in Paris on 21 July.

== Stage 1a ==
27 June 1968 - Vittel, 6.1 km (3.8 mi) (ITT)

Stage 1a result and General Classification after Stage 1a

	Rider	Team	Time
1	Charly Grosskost (FRA)	France B	8' 27.17"
2	Jan Janssen (NED)	Netherlands	+ 2"
3	Raymond Poulidor (FRA)	France A	+ 5"
4	Franco Bitossi (ITA)	Italy	+ 13"
5	Gilbert Bellone (FRA)	France B	+ 14"
6	Ferdinand Bracke (BEL)	Belgium B	s.t.
7	Hugh Porter (GBR)	Great Britain	+ 15"
8	Désiré Letort (FRA)	France C	+ 18"
9	Antonio Gómez del Moral (ESP)	Spain	+ 19"
10	Wilfried David (BEL)	Belgium B	+ 21"

== Stage 1b ==
28 June 1968 - Vittel to Esch-sur-Alzette, 189 km (117.4 mi)

Stage 1b result

Rank	Rider	Team	Time
1	Charly Grosskost (FRA)	France B	4h 34' 51"
2	Italo Zilioli (ITA)	Italy	s.t.
3	Herman Van Springel (BEL)	Belgium A	s.t.
4	José Samyn (FRA)	France A	s.t.
5	Bernard Guyot (FRA)	France A	s.t.
6	Carlo Chiappano (ITA)	Italy	+ 6"
7	Anatole Novak (FRA)	France A	+ 10"
8	Gerard Vianen (NED)	Netherlands	+ 17"
9	Georges Pintens (BEL)	Belgium A	+ 22"
10	Walter Godefroot (BEL)	Belgium B	+ 47"

General classification after stage 1b

Rank	Rider	Team	Time
1	Charly Grosskost (FRA)	France B	4h 42' 58"
2	Herman Van Springel (BEL)	Belgium A	+ 38"
3	Italo Zilioli (ITA)	Italy	+ 40"
4	Bernard Guyot (FRA)	France A	+ 44"
5	José Samyn (FRA)	France A	+ 45"
6	Gerard Vianen (NED)	Netherlands	+ 1' 03"
7	Carlo Chiappano (ITA)	Italy	+ 1' 09"
8	Anatole Novak (FRA)	France A	+ 1' 12"
9	Jan Janssen (NED)	Netherlands	+ 1' 25"
10	Raymond Poulidor (FRA)	France A	+ 1' 28"

== Stage 2 ==
29 June 1968 - Arlon to Forest, 210.5 km (130.8 mi)

Stage 2 result

Rank	Rider	Team	Time
1	Erik De Vlaeminck (BEL)	Belgium B	5h 31' 41"
2	Jean-Pierre Genet (FRA)	France A	+ 1"
3	Georges Pintens (BEL)	Belgium A	s.t.
4	Carlos Echeverría (ESP)	Spain	+ 2"
5	Antoon Houbrechts (BEL)	Belgium B	s.t.
6	Jean Monteyne (BEL)	Belgium B	+ 9"
7	Daniel Van Ryckeghem (BEL)	Belgium A	+ 14"
8	Gerard Vianen (NED)	Netherlands	+ 24"
9	Edy Schütz (LUX)	Switzerland/Luxembourg	s.t.
10	Franco Bitossi (ITA)	Italy	s.t.

General classification after stage 2

Rank	Rider	Team	Time
1	Charly Grosskost (FRA)	France B	10h 15' 36"
2	Herman Van Springel (BEL)	Belgium A	+ 5"
3	Italo Zilioli (ITA)	Italy	+ 7"
4	Bernard Guyot (FRA)	France A	+ 23"
5	José Samyn (FRA)	France A	+ 24"
6	Gerard Vianen (NED)	Netherlands	+ 30"
7	Georges Pintens (BEL)	Belgium A	+ 35"
8	Erik De Vlaeminck (BEL)	Belgium B	+ 37"
9	Carlo Chiappano (ITA)	Italy	+ 48"
10	Anatole Novak (FRA)	France A	+ 51"

== Stage 3a ==
30 June 1968 - Forest, 22 km (14 mi) (TTT)

Stage 3a result

Rank	Team	Time
1	Belgium A	2h 27' 21"
2	France A	+ 1' 41"
3	Spain	+ 2' 07"
4	Belgium B	+ 2' 17"
5	Italy	+ 4' 20"
6	Netherlands	+ 6' 00"
7	Great Britain	+ 7' 28"
8	Germany	+ 10' 16"
9	France B	+ 10' 55"
10	Switzerland/Luxembourg	+ 11' 05"

General classification after stage 3a

Rank	Rider	Team	Time
1	Herman Van Springel (BEL)	Belgium A	10h 15' 21"
2	Charly Grosskost (FRA)	France B	+ 15"
3	Italo Zilioli (ITA)	Italy	+ 22"
4	Bernard Guyot (FRA)	France A	+ 28"
5	José Samyn (FRA)	France A	+ 29"
6	Georges Pintens (BEL)	Belgium A	+ 30"
7	Gerard Vianen (NED)	Netherlands	+ 45"
8	Erik De Vlaeminck (BEL)	Belgium B	+ 52"
9	Raymond Poulidor (FRA)	France A	+ 1' 00"
10	Daniel Van Ryckeghem (BEL)	Belgium A	+ 1' 02"

== Stage 3b ==
30 June 1968 - Forest to Roubaix, 112 km (70 mi)

Stage 3b result

Rank	Rider	Team	Time
1	Walter Godefroot (BEL)	Belgium B	2h 37' 52"
2	Jan Janssen (NED)	Netherlands	s.t.
3	Paul Lemeteyer (FRA)	France B	s.t.
4	Harm Ottenbros (NED)	Netherlands	s.t.
5	Daniel Van Ryckeghem (BEL)	Belgium A	s.t.
6	Franco Bitossi (ITA)	Italy	s.t.
7	José Samyn (FRA)	France A	s.t.
8	Herman Van Springel (BEL)	Belgium A	s.t.
9	Michael Wright (GBR)	Great Britain	s.t.
10	Gilbert Bellone (FRA)	France B	s.t.

General classification after stage 3b

Rank	Rider	Team	Time
1	Herman Van Springel (BEL)	Belgium A	12h 53' 13"
2	Charly Grosskost (FRA)	France B	+ 15"
3	Italo Zilioli (ITA)	Italy	+ 22"
4	Bernard Guyot (FRA)	France A	+ 28"
5	José Samyn (FRA)	France A	+ 29"
6	Georges Pintens (BEL)	Belgium A	+ 30"
7	Gerard Vianen (NED)	Netherlands	+ 45"
8	Walter Godefroot (BEL)	Belgium B	+ 51"
9	Erik De Vlaeminck (BEL)	Belgium B	+ 52"
10	Jan Janssen (NED)	Netherlands	+ 57"

== Stage 4 ==
1 July 1968 - Roubaix to Rouen, 238 km (148 mi)

Stage 4 result

Rank	Rider	Team	Time
1	Georges Chappe (FRA)	France B	6h 23' 30"
2	Georges Vandenberghe (BEL)	Belgium B	+ 3"
3	Serge Bolley (FRA)	France B	s.t.
4	Willy In 't Ven (BEL)	Belgium A	s.t.
5	Adriano Passuello (ITA)	Italy	s.t.
6	Jean-Pierre Genet (FRA)	France A	s.t.
7	Silvano Schiavon (ITA)	Italy	s.t.
8	Jean Stablinski (FRA)	France A	+ 26"
9	Antonio Gómez del Moral (ESP)	Spain	+ 2' 49"
10	Roland Smaniotto (LUX)	Switzerland/Luxembourg	s.t.

General classification after stage 4

Rank	Rider	Team	Time
1	Jean-Pierre Genet (FRA)	France A	19h 17' 54"
2	Willy In 't Ven (BEL)	Belgium A	+ 18"
3	Georges Vandenberghe (BEL)	Belgium B	+ 29"
4	Silvano Schiavon (ITA)	Italy	+ 36"
5	Georges Chappe (FRA)	France B	+ 41"
6	Adriano Passuello (ITA)	Italy	+ 44"
7	Herman Van Springel (BEL)	Belgium A	+ 2' 15"
8	Charly Grosskost (FRA)	France B	+ 2' 30"
9	Italo Zilioli (ITA)	Italy	+ 2' 37"
10	Bernard Guyot (FRA)	France A	+ 2' 43"

== Stage 5a ==
2 July 1968 - Rouen to Bagnoles-de-l'Orne, 165 km (103 mi)

Stage 5a result

Rank	Rider	Team	Time
1	André Desvages (FRA)	France C	4h 50' 07"
2	Arie den Hartog (NED)	Netherlands	s.t.
3	Georges Vandenberghe (BEL)	Belgium B	s.t.
4	Bernard Guyot (FRA)	France A	s.t.
5	Sebastián Elorza (ESP)	Spain	s.t.
6	Jean-Pierre Ducasse (FRA)	France B	s.t.
7	Franco Bitossi (ITA)	Italy	+ 3' 40"
8	Walter Godefroot (BEL)	Belgium B	+ 3' 41"
9	Michael Wright (GBR)	Great Britain	s.t.
10	Harm Ottenbros (NED)	Netherlands	s.t.

General classification after stage 5a

Rank	Rider	Team	Time
1	Georges Vandenberghe (BEL)	Belgium B	24h 08' 25"
2	Bernard Guyot (FRA)	France A	+ 2' 19"
3	Jean-Pierre Genet (FRA)	France A	+ 3' 17"
4	Arie den Hartog (NED)	Netherlands	+ 3' 26"
5	Willy In 't Ven (BEL)	Belgium A	+ 3' 35"
6	Jean-Pierre Ducasse (FRA)	France B	+ 3' 44"
7	Sebastián Elorza (ESP)	Spain	+ 3' 47"
8	Silvano Schiavon (ITA)	Italy	+ 3' 53"
9	Georges Chappe (FRA)	France B	+ 3' 58"
10	Adriano Passuello (ITA)	Italy	+ 4' 01"

== Stage 5b ==
2 July 1968 - Bagnoles-de-l'Orne to Dinard, 154.5 km (96.0 mi)

Stage 5b result

Rank	Rider	Team	Time
1	Jean Dumont (FRA)	France C	4h 32' 21"
2	Franco Bitossi (ITA)	Italy	+ 9"
3	Georges Vandenberghe (BEL)	Belgium B	s.t.
4	Paul Lemeteyer (FRA)	France B	s.t.
5	Daniel Van Ryckeghem (BEL)	Belgium A	s.t.
6	Erik De Vlaeminck (BEL)	Belgium B	s.t.
7	Jan Janssen (NED)	Netherlands	s.t.
8	Walter Godefroot (BEL)	Belgium B	s.t.
9	Serge Bolley (FRA)	France B	s.t.
10	Harm Ottenbros (NED)	Netherlands	s.t.

General classification after stage 5b

Rank	Rider	Team	Time
1	Georges Vandenberghe (BEL)	Belgium B	28h 40' 50"
2	Bernard Guyot (FRA)	France A	+ 2' 24"
3	Jean-Pierre Genet (FRA)	France A	+ 3' 22"
4	Arie den Hartog (NED)	Netherlands	+ 3' 31"
5	Willy In 't Ven (BEL)	Belgium A	+ 3' 40"
6	Jean-Pierre Ducasse (FRA)	France B	+ 3' 49"
7	Sebastián Elorza (ESP)	Spain	+ 3' 52"
8	Silvano Schiavon (ITA)	Italy	+ 3' 58"
9	Georges Chappe (FRA)	France B	+ 4' 03"
10	Adriano Passuello (ITA)	Italy	+ 4' 06"

== Stage 6 ==
3 July 1968 - Dinard to Lorient, 188 km (117 mi)

Stage 6 result

Rank	Rider	Team	Time
1	Aurelio González Puente (ESP)	Spain	4h 40' 34"
2	Walter Godefroot (BEL)	Belgium B	+ 9"
3	Georges Vandenberghe (BEL)	Belgium B	s.t.
4	Harm Ottenbros (NED)	Netherlands	s.t.
5	Charly Grosskost (FRA)	France B	s.t.
6	Franco Bitossi (ITA)	Italy	s.t.
7	Daniel Van Ryckeghem (BEL)	Belgium A	s.t.
8	Ernst Streng (FRG)	Germany	s.t.
9	Gerard Vianen (NED)	Netherlands	s.t.
10	Serge Bolley (FRA)	France B	s.t.

General classification after stage 6

Rank	Rider	Team	Time
1	Georges Vandenberghe (BEL)	Belgium B	33h 21' 28"
2	Bernard Guyot (FRA)	France A	+ 2' 29"
3	Jean-Pierre Genet (FRA)	France A	+ 3' 27"
4	Arie den Hartog (NED)	Netherlands	+ 3' 36"
5	Willy In 't Ven (BEL)	Belgium A	+ 3' 45"
6	Jean-Pierre Ducasse (FRA)	France B	+ 3' 54"
7	Sebastián Elorza (ESP)	Spain	+ 3' 57"
8	Silvano Schiavon (ITA)	Italy	+ 4' 03"
9	Georges Chappe (FRA)	France B	+ 4' 08"
10	Adriano Passuello (ITA)	Italy	+ 4' 11"

== Stage 7 ==
4 July 1968 - Lorient to Nantes, 190 km (120 mi)

The finishing times were recorded at the entrance to the Nantes velodrome.

Stage 7 result

Rank	Rider	Team	Time
1	Franco Bitossi (ITA)	Italy	4h 58' 23"
2	Gerard Vianen (NED)	Netherlands	4h 58' 20"
3	Jan Janssen (NED)	Netherlands	4h 58' 23"
4	Georges Vandenberghe (BEL)	Belgium B	s.t.
5	Paul Lemeteyer (FRA)	France B	s.t.
6	Walter Godefroot (BEL)	Belgium B	s.t.
7	André Desvages (FRA)	France C	s.t.
8	Barry Hoban (GBR)	Great Britain	s.t.
9	Jos Huysmans (BEL)	Belgium A	s.t.
10	Edouard Weckx (BEL)	Belgium A	s.t.

General classification after stage 7

Rank	Rider	Team	Time
1	Georges Vandenberghe (BEL)	Belgium B	38h 19' 51"
2	Bernard Guyot (FRA)	France A	+ 2' 29"
3	Jean-Pierre Genet (FRA)	France A	+ 3' 27"
4	Arie den Hartog (NED)	Netherlands	+ 3' 36"
5	Willy In 't Ven (BEL)	Belgium A	+ 3' 45"
6	Jean-Pierre Ducasse (FRA)	France B	+ 3' 54"
7	Sebastián Elorza (ESP)	Spain	+ 3' 57"
8	Silvano Schiavon (ITA)	Italy	+ 4' 03"
9	Georges Chappe (FRA)	France B	+ 4' 08"
10	Adriano Passuello (ITA)	Italy	+ 4' 11"

== Stage 8 ==
5 July 1968 - Nantes to Royan, 223 km (139 mi)

Stage 8 result

Rank	Rider	Team	Time
1	Daniel Van Ryckeghem (BEL)	Belgium A	5h 25' 26"
2	Jan Janssen (NED)	Netherlands	s.t.
3	Franco Bitossi (ITA)	Italy	s.t.
4	Eric Leman (BEL)	Belgium B	s.t.
5	Gerard Vianen (NED)	Netherlands	s.t.
6	Walter Godefroot (BEL)	Belgium B	s.t.
7	Georges Vandenberghe (BEL)	Belgium B	s.t.
8	André Desvages (FRA)	France C	s.t.
9	Michael Wright (GBR)	Great Britain	s.t.
10	Paul Lemeteyer (FRA)	France B	s.t.

General classification after stage 8

Rank	Rider	Team	Time
1	Georges Vandenberghe (BEL)	Belgium B	43h 45' 17"
2	Bernard Guyot (FRA)	France A	+ 2' 29"
3	Jean-Pierre Genet (FRA)	France A	+ 3' 27"
4	Arie den Hartog (NED)	Netherlands	+ 3' 36"
5	Willy In 't Ven (BEL)	Belgium A	+ 3' 45"
6	Jean-Pierre Ducasse (FRA)	France B	+ 3' 54"
7	Sebastián Elorza (ESP)	Spain	+ 3' 57"
8	Silvano Schiavon (ITA)	Italy	+ 4' 03"
9	Georges Chappe (FRA)	France B	+ 4' 08"
10	Adriano Passuello (ITA)	Italy	+ 4' 11"

== Rest Day 1 ==
6 July 1968 - Royan

== Stage 9 ==
7 July 1968 - Royan to Bordeaux, 137.5 km (85.4 mi)

Stage 9 result

Rank	Rider	Team	Time
1	Walter Godefroot (BEL)	Belgium B	5h 23' 39"
2	Barry Hoban (GBR)	Great Britain	s.t.
3	Daniel Van Ryckeghem (BEL)	Belgium A	s.t.
4	Georges Vandenberghe (BEL)	Belgium B	s.t.
5	John Clarey (GBR)	Great Britain	s.t.
6	Paul Lemeteyer (FRA)	France B	s.t.
7	Charly Grosskost (FRA)	France B	s.t.
8	Franco Bitossi (ITA)	Italy	s.t.
9	Jan Janssen (NED)	Netherlands	s.t.
10	Eric Leman (BEL)	Belgium B	s.t.

General classification after stage 9

Rank	Rider	Team	Time
1	Georges Vandenberghe (BEL)	Belgium B	47h 04' 33"
2	Bernard Guyot (FRA)	France A	+ 2' 29"
3	Jean-Pierre Genet (FRA)	France A	+ 3' 27"
4	Arie den Hartog (NED)	Netherlands	+ 3' 36"
5	Willy In 't Ven (BEL)	Belgium A	+ 3' 45"
6	Jean-Pierre Ducasse (FRA)	France B	+ 3' 54"
7	Sebastián Elorza (ESP)	Spain	+ 3' 57"
8	Silvano Schiavon (ITA)	Italy	+ 4' 03"
9	Georges Chappe (FRA)	France B	+ 4' 08"
10	Adriano Passuello (ITA)	Italy	+ 4' 11"

== Stage 10 ==
8 July 1968 - Bordeaux to Bayonne, 202.5 km (125.8 mi)

Stage 10 result

Rank	Rider	Team	Time
1	Gilbert Bellone (FRA)	France B	5h 23' 39"
2	Jan Janssen (NED)	Netherlands	+ 10"
3	Barry Hoban (GBR)	Great Britain	5h 23'46"
4	Franco Bitossi (ITA)	Italy	s.t.
5	Walter Godefroot (BEL)	Belgium B	s.t.
6	Harm Ottenbros (NED)	Netherlands	s.t.
7	Daniel Van Ryckeghem (BEL)	Belgium A	s.t.
8	Gerard Vianen (NED)	Netherlands	s.t.
9	Michael Wright (GBR)	Great Britain	s.t.
10	Flaviano Vicentini (ITA)	Italy	s.t.

General classification after stage 10

Rank	Rider	Team	Time
1	Georges Vandenberghe (BEL)	Belgium B	52h 28' 22"
2	Bernard Guyot (FRA)	France A	+ 2' 29"
3	Jean-Pierre Genet (FRA)	France A	+ 3' 27"
4	Arie den Hartog (NED)	Netherlands	+ 3' 36"
5	Willy In 't Ven (BEL)	Belgium A	+ 3' 45"
6	Jean-Pierre Ducasse (FRA)	France B	+ 3' 54"
7	Sebastián Elorza (ESP)	Spain	+ 3' 57"
8	Silvano Schiavon (ITA)	Italy	+ 4' 03"
9	Georges Chappe (FRA)	France B	+ 4' 08"
10	Adriano Passuello (ITA)	Italy	+ 4' 11"
