= 1968 Tour de France, Stage 11 to Stage 22b =

Cycling race stages

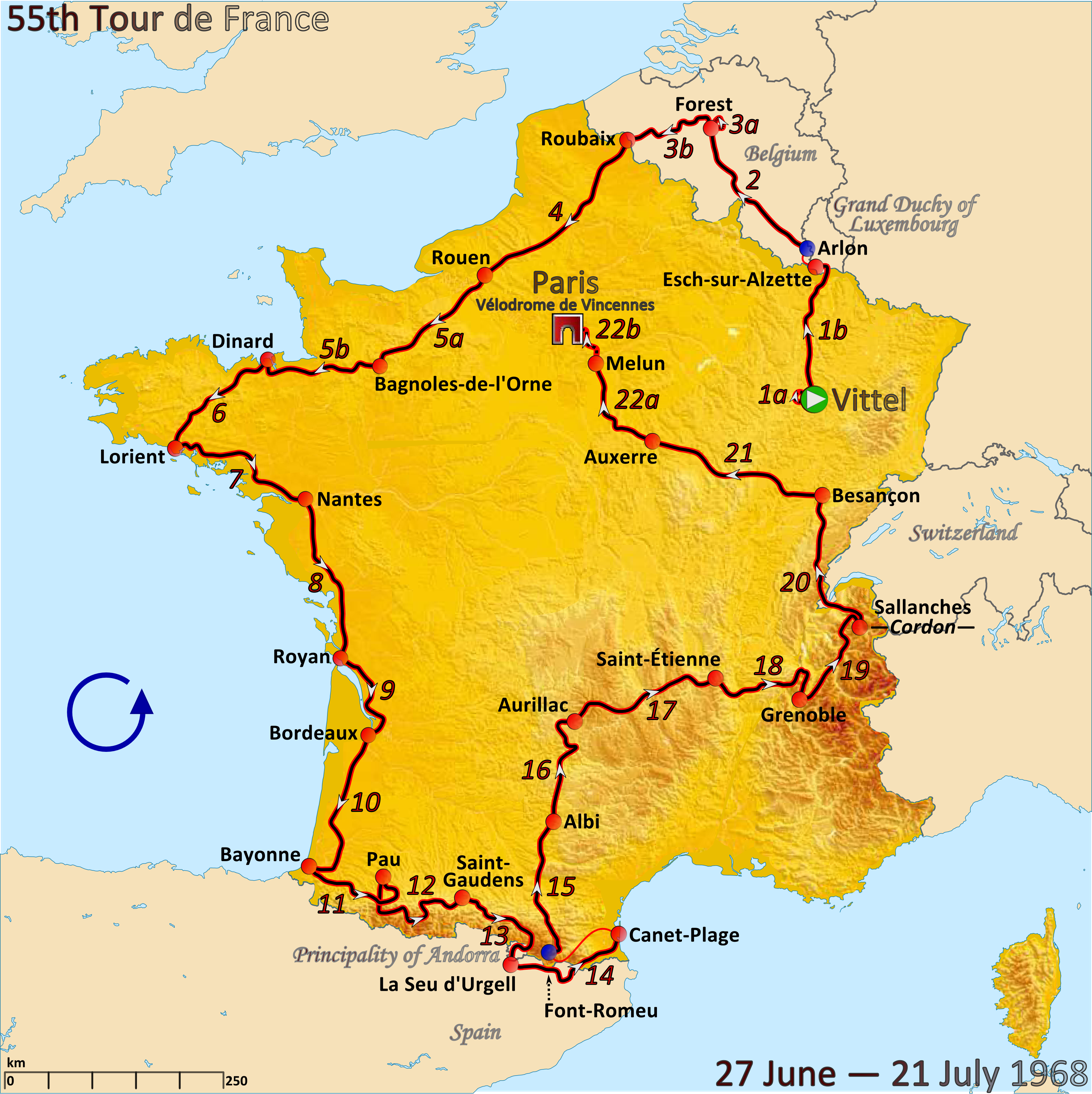
Route of the 1968 Tour de France

The 1968 Tour de France was the 55th edition of Tour de France, one of cycling's Grand Tours. The Tour began in Vittel with an individual time trial on 27 June and Stage 11 occurred on 9 July with a flat stage from Bayonne. The race finished in Paris on 21 July.

== Stage 11 ==
9 July 1968 - Bayonne to Pau, 183.5 km (114.0 mi)

Stage 11 result

Rank	Rider	Team	Time
1	Daniel Van Ryckeghem (BEL)	Belgium A	5h 28' 47"
2	Walter Godefroot (BEL)	Belgium B	s.t.
3	Adriano Passuello (ITA)	Italy	s.t.
4	Karl Brand (SUI)	Switzerland/Luxembourg	s.t.
5	Gregorio San Miguel (ESP)	Spain	s.t.
6	André Bayssière (FRA)	France C	s.t.
7	Jean Jourden (FRA)	France A	s.t.
8	Franco Bitossi (ITA)	Italy	+ 40"
9	Georges Pintens (BEL)	Belgium A	s.t.
10	Serge Bolley (FRA)	France B	s.t.

General classification after stage 11

Rank	Rider	Team	Time
1	Georges Vandenberghe (BEL)	Belgium B	57h 57' 49"
2	Bernard Guyot (FRA)	France A	+ 2' 29"
3	Adriano Passuello (ITA)	Italy	+ 3' 26"
4	Jean-Pierre Genet (FRA)	France A	+ 3' 27"
5	Arie den Hartog (NED)	Netherlands	+ 3' 36"
6	Willy In 't Ven (BEL)	Belgium A	+ 3' 45"
7	Jean-Pierre Ducasse (FRA)	France B	+ 3' 54"
8	Sebastián Elorza (ESP)	Spain	+ 3' 57"
9	Silvano Schiavon (ITA)	Italy	+ 4' 03"
10	Georges Chappe (FRA)	France B	+ 4' 08"

== Stage 12 ==
10 July 1968 - Pau to Saint-Gaudens, 226.5 km (140.7 mi)

Stage 12 result

Rank	Rider	Team	Time
1	Georges Pintens (BEL)	Belgium A	7h 33' 34"
2	Silvano Schiavon (ITA)	Italy	s.t.
3	Andrés Gandarias (ESP)	Spain	s.t.
4	Vicente López Carril (ESP)	Spain	s.t.
5	Rolf Wolfshohl (FRG)	Germany	s.t.
6	Raymond Poulidor (FRA)	France A	s.t.
7	Gregorio San Miguel (ESP)	Spain	s.t.
8	Ferdinand Bracke (BEL)	Belgium B	+ 40"
9	Karl-Heinz Kunde (FRG)	Germany	+ 4"
10	Aurelio González Puente (ESP)	Spain	+ 8"

General classification after stage 12

Rank	Rider	Team	Time
1	Georges Vandenberghe (BEL)	Belgium B	65h 33' 52"
2	Silvano Schiavon (ITA)	Italy	+ 1' 34"
3	Adriano Passuello (ITA)	Italy	+ 3' 26"
4	Georges Pintens (BEL)	Belgium A	+ 3' 43"
5	Raymond Poulidor (FRA)	France A	+ 4' 13"
6	Gregorio San Miguel (ESP)	Spain	+ 4' 22"
7	Ferdinand Bracke (BEL)	Belgium B	+ 4' 35"
8	Rolf Wolfshohl (FRG)	Germany	+ 4' 47"
9	Aurelio González Puente (ESP)	Spain	+ 4' 56"
10	Vicente López Carril (ESP)	Spain	+ 5' 09"

== Stage 13 ==
11 July 1968 - Saint-Gaudens to La Seu d'Urgell, 208.5 km (129.6 mi)

Stage 13 result

Rank	Rider	Team	Time
1	Herman Van Springel (BEL)	Belgium A	6h 59' 55"
2	Antonio Gómez del Moral (ESP)	Spain	s.t.
3	Rolf Wolfshohl (FRG)	Germany	+ 1"
4	Gregorio San Miguel (ESP)	Spain	s.t.
5	Ugo Colombo (ITA)	Italy	+ 2"
6	Franco Bitossi (ITA)	Italy	s.t.
7	Jan Janssen (NED)	Netherlands	s.t.
8	Georges Vandenberghe (BEL)	Belgium B	s.t.
9	Michael Wright (GBR)	Great Britain	s.t.
10	Antoon Houbrechts (BEL)	Belgium B	s.t.

General classification after stage 13

Rank	Rider	Team	Time
1	Georges Vandenberghe (BEL)	Belgium B	72h 33' 49"
2	Silvano Schiavon (ITA)	Italy	+ 1' 34"
3	Adriano Passuello (ITA)	Italy	+ 3' 26"
4	Georges Pintens (BEL)	Belgium A	+ 3' 43"
5	Raymond Poulidor (FRA)	France A	+ 4' 13"
6	Gregorio San Miguel (ESP)	Spain	+ 4' 21"
7	Ferdinand Bracke (BEL)	Belgium B	+ 4' 36"
8	Rolf Wolfshohl (FRG)	Germany	+ 4' 46"
9	Aurelio González Puente (ESP)	Spain	+ 4' 56"
10	Vicente López Carril (ESP)	Spain	+ 5' 09"

== Stage 14 ==
12 July 1968 - La Seu d'Urgell to Perpignan, 231.5 km (143.8 mi)

Stage 14 result

Rank	Rider	Team	Time
1	Jan Janssen (NED)	Netherlands	7h 28' 43"
2	Walter Godefroot (BEL)	Belgium B	+ 2"
3	Daniel Van Ryckeghem (BEL)	Belgium A	s.t.
4	Eric Leman (BEL)	Belgium B	s.t.
5	Georges Vandenberghe (BEL)	Belgium B	s.t.
6	Michael Wright (GBR)	Great Britain	s.t.
7	Serge Bolley (FRA)	France B	s.t.
8	Barry Hoban (GBR)	Great Britain	s.t.
9	Jos Huysmans (BEL)	Belgium A	s.t.
10	Jean Dumont (FRA)	France C	s.t.

General classification after stage 14

Rank	Rider	Team	Time
1	Georges Vandenberghe (BEL)	Belgium B	80h 02' 34"
2	Silvano Schiavon (ITA)	Italy	+ 1' 34"
3	Adriano Passuello (ITA)	Italy	+ 3' 26"
4	Georges Pintens (BEL)	Belgium A	+ 4' 13"
5	Raymond Poulidor (FRA)	France A	s.t.
6	Gregorio San Miguel (ESP)	Spain	+ 4' 21"
7	Ferdinand Bracke (BEL)	Belgium B	+ 4' 36"
8	Rolf Wolfshohl (FRG)	Germany	+ 4' 46"
9	Aurelio González Puente (ESP)	Spain	+ 4' 56"
10	Vicente López Carril (ESP)	Spain	+ 5' 09"

== Rest Day 2 ==
13 July 1968 - Font-Romeu-Odeillo-Via

== Stage 15 ==
14 July 1968 - Font-Romeu-Odeillo-Via to Albi, 250.5 km (155.7 mi)

Stage 15 result

Rank	Rider	Team	Time
1	Roger Pingeon (FRA)	France A	6h 20' 36"
2	Walter Godefroot (BEL)	Belgium B	+ 2' 58"
3	Michael Wright (GBR)	Great Britain	s.t.
4	Jan Janssen (NED)	Netherlands	s.t.
5	Georges Vandenberghe (BEL)	Belgium B	s.t.
6	Barry Hoban (GBR)	Great Britain	s.t.
7	Franco Bitossi (ITA)	Italy	s.t.
8	Adriano Passuello (ITA)	Italy	s.t.
9	Victor Nuelant (BEL)	Belgium B	s.t.
10	Jean Dumont (FRA)	France C	s.t.

General classification after stage 15

Rank	Rider	Team	Time
1	Georges Vandenberghe (BEL)	Belgium B	86h 26' 08"
2	Silvano Schiavon (ITA)	Italy	+ 1' 34"
3	Adriano Passuello (ITA)	Italy	+ 3' 26"
4	Roger Pingeon (FRA)	France A	+ 4' 01"
5	Georges Pintens (BEL)	Belgium A	+ 4' 13"
6	Gregorio San Miguel (ESP)	Spain	+ 4' 21"
7	Rolf Wolfshohl (FRG)	Germany	+ 4' 46"
8	Vicente López Carril (ESP)	Spain	+ 5' 09"
9	Raymond Poulidor (FRA)	France A	+ 5' 18"
10	Herman Van Springel (BEL)	Belgium A	+ 5' 40"

== Stage 16 ==
15 July 1968 - Albi to Aurillac, 199 km (124 mi)

Stage 16 result

Rank	Rider	Team	Time
1	Franco Bitossi (ITA)	Italy	5h 39' 09"
2	Rolf Wolfshohl (FRG)	Germany	s.t.
3	Walter Godefroot (BEL)	Belgium B	+ 1' 05"
4	Jan Janssen (NED)	Netherlands	s.t.
5	Flaviano Vicentini (ITA)	Italy	s.t.
6	Herman Van Springel (BEL)	Belgium A	s.t.
7	Antonio Gómez del Moral (ESP)	Spain	s.t.
8	Andrés Gandarias (ESP)	Spain	s.t.
9	Ugo Colombo (ITA)	Italy	s.t.
10	Ferdinand Bracke (BEL)	Belgium B	s.t.

General classification after stage 16

Rank	Rider	Team	Time
1	Rolf Wolfshohl (FRG)	Germany	92h 09' 53"
2	Gregorio San Miguel (ESP)	Spain	+ 50"
3	Franco Bitossi (ITA)	Italy	+ 1' 17"
4	Herman Van Springel (BEL)	Belgium A	+ 2' 09"
5	Ferdinand Bracke (BEL)	Belgium B	+ 2' 10"
6	Andrés Gandarias (ESP)	Spain	+ 2' 18"
7	Jan Janssen (NED)	Netherlands	+ 2' 21"
8	Antonio Gómez del Moral (ESP)	Spain	+ 3' 08"
9	Ugo Colombo (ITA)	Italy	+ 3' 59"
10	Walter Godefroot (BEL)	Belgium B	+ 4' 10"

== Stage 17 ==
16 July 1968 - Aurillac to Saint-Étienne, 236.5 km (147.0 mi)

Stage 17 result

Rank	Rider	Team	Time
1	Jean-Pierre Genet (FRA)	France A	7h 22' 33"
2	Georges Chappe (FRA)	France B	+ 2"
3	Willy Spuhler (SUI)	Switzerland/Luxembourg	+ 27"
4	Christian Raymond (FRA)	France A	+ 12' 03"
5	Erik De Vlaeminck (BEL)	Belgium B	+ 12' 18"
6	Eric Leman (BEL)	Belgium B	+ 12' 55"
7	Franco Bitossi (ITA)	Italy	s.t.
8	Daniel Van Ryckeghem (BEL)	Belgium A	s.t.
9	Michael Wright (GBR)	Great Britain	s.t.
10	Georges Pintens (BEL)	Belgium A	s.t.

General classification after stage 17

Rank	Rider	Team	Time
1	Rolf Wolfshohl (FRG)	Germany	99h 25' 21"
2	Gregorio San Miguel (ESP)	Spain	+ 50"
3	Franco Bitossi (ITA)	Italy	+ 1' 17"
4	Herman Van Springel (BEL)	Belgium A	+ 2' 09"
5	Ferdinand Bracke (BEL)	Belgium B	+ 2' 10"
6	Andrés Gandarias (ESP)	Spain	+ 2' 18"
7	Jan Janssen (NED)	Netherlands	+ 2' 21"
8	Antonio Gómez del Moral (ESP)	Spain	+ 3' 08"
9	Ugo Colombo (ITA)	Italy	+ 3' 59"
10	Walter Godefroot (BEL)	Belgium B	+ 4' 10"

== Stage 18 ==
17 July 1968 - Saint-Étienne to Grenoble, 235 km (146 mi)

Stage 18 result

Rank	Rider	Team	Time
1	Roger Pingeon (FRA)	France A	7h 47' 13"
2	Lucien Aimar (FRA)	France B	+ 2' 35"
3	Jan Janssen (NED)	Netherlands	+ 3' 53"
4	Georges Pintens (BEL)	Belgium A	s.t.
5	Antoon Houbrechts (BEL)	Belgium B	s.t.
6	Herman Van Springel (BEL)	Belgium A	s.t.
7	Ferdinand Bracke (BEL)	Belgium B	+ 4' 29"
8	Andrés Gandarias (ESP)	Spain	+ 4' 42"
9	Gregorio San Miguel (ESP)	Spain	s.t.
10	Georges Vandenberghe (BEL)	Belgium B	+ 5' 45"

General classification after stage 18

Rank	Rider	Team	Time
1	Gregorio San Miguel (ESP)	Spain	107h 18' 06"
2	Herman Van Springel (BEL)	Belgium A	+ 30"
3	Jan Janssen (NED)	Netherlands	+ 42"
4	Ferdinand Bracke (BEL)	Belgium B	+ 1' 07"
5	Andrés Gandarias (ESP)	Spain	+ 1' 28"
6	Franco Bitossi (ITA)	Italy	+ 1' 30"
7	Lucien Aimar (FRA)	France B	+ 1' 51"
8	Rolf Wolfshohl (FRG)	Germany	+ 2' 02"
9	Roger Pingeon (FRA)	France A	+ 2' 54"
10	Antonio Gómez del Moral (ESP)	Spain	+ 3' 21"

== Stage 19 ==
18 July 1968 - Grenoble to Sallanches, 200 km (120 mi)

Stage 19 result

Rank	Rider	Team	Time
1	Barry Hoban (GBR)	Great Britain	7h 06' 23"
2	Franco Bitossi (ITA)	Italy	+ 4' 06"
3	Herman Van Springel (BEL)	Belgium A	+ 4' 07"
4	Roger Pingeon (FRA)	France A	+ 4' 11"
5	Jan Janssen (NED)	Netherlands	s.t.
6	Andrés Gandarias (ESP)	Spain	+ 4' 24"
7	Lucien Aimar (FRA)	France B	s.t.
8	Ugo Colombo (ITA)	Italy	+ 4' 47"
9	Rolf Wolfshohl (FRG)	Germany	s.t.
10	Gregorio San Miguel (ESP)	Spain	+ 4' 49"

General classification after stage 19

Rank	Rider	Team	Time
1	Herman Van Springel (BEL)	Belgium A	114h 29' 06"
2	Gregorio San Miguel (ESP)	Spain	+ 12"
3	Jan Janssen (NED)	Netherlands	+ 16"
4	Franco Bitossi (ITA)	Italy	+ 59"
5	Andrés Gandarias (ESP)	Spain	+ 1' 15"
6	Lucien Aimar (FRA)	France B	+ 1' 38"
7	Ferdinand Bracke (BEL)	Belgium B	+ 1' 56"
8	Rolf Wolfshohl (FRG)	Germany	+ 2' 12"
9	Roger Pingeon (FRA)	France A	+ 2' 28"
10	Antonio Gómez del Moral (ESP)	Spain	+ 3' 38"

== Stage 20 ==
19 July 1968 - Sallanches to Besançon, 242.5 km (150.7 mi)

Stage 20 result

Rank	Rider	Team	Time
1	Jos Huysmans (BEL)	Belgium A	6h 56' 02"
2	Michel Grain (FRA)	France B	s.t.
3	Aurelio González Puente (ESP)	Spain	s.t.
4	Walter Godefroot (BEL)	Belgium B	+ 10' 18"
5	Franco Bitossi (ITA)	Italy	s.t.
6	Rolf Wolfshohl (FRG)	Germany	s.t.
7	Serge Bolley (FRA)	France B	s.t.
8	Daniel Van Ryckeghem (BEL)	Belgium A	s.t.
9	Herman Van Springel (BEL)	Belgium A	s.t.
10	Georges Pintens (BEL)	Belgium A	s.t.

General classification after stage 20

Rank	Rider	Team	Time
1	Herman Van Springel (BEL)	Belgium A	121h 35' 26"
2	Gregorio San Miguel (ESP)	Spain	+ 12"
3	Jan Janssen (NED)	Netherlands	+ 16"
4	Franco Bitossi (ITA)	Italy	+ 59"
5	Andrés Gandarias (ESP)	Spain	+ 1' 15"
6	Lucien Aimar (FRA)	France B	+ 1' 38"
7	Ferdinand Bracke (BEL)	Belgium B	+ 1' 56"
8	Rolf Wolfshohl (FRG)	Germany	+ 2' 12"
9	Roger Pingeon (FRA)	France A	+ 2' 28"
10	Antonio Gómez del Moral (ESP)	Spain	+ 3' 38"

== Stage 21 ==
20 July 1968 - Besançon to Auxerre, 242 km (150 mi)

Stage 21 result

Rank	Rider	Team	Time
1	Eric Leman (BEL)	Belgium B	6h 50' 42"
2	Michael Wright (GBR)	Great Britain	s.t.
3	Vicente López Carril (ESP)	Spain	+ 2"
4	Jean-Pierre Ducasse (FRA)	France B	+ 4"
5	Jean Dumont (FRA)	France C	+ 6"
6	André Poppe (BEL)	Belgium A	+ 7"
7	Evert Dolman (NED)	Netherlands	+ 5' 54"
8	Vin Denson (GBR)	Great Britain	+ 5' 56"
9	Gilbert Bellone (FRA)	France B	+ 6' 46"
10	Bernard Guyot (FRA)	France A	+ 6' 47"

General classification after stage 21

Rank	Rider	Team	Time
1	Herman Van Springel (BEL)	Belgium A	128h 34' 11"
2	Gregorio San Miguel (ESP)	Spain	+ 12"
3	Jan Janssen (NED)	Netherlands	+ 16"
4	Franco Bitossi (ITA)	Italy	+ 58"
5	Andrés Gandarias (ESP)	Spain	+ 1' 15"
6	Lucien Aimar (FRA)	France B	+ 1' 38"
7	Ferdinand Bracke (BEL)	Belgium B	+ 1' 56"
8	Rolf Wolfshohl (FRG)	Germany	+ 2' 12"
9	Roger Pingeon (FRA)	France A	+ 2' 28"
10	Antonio Gómez del Moral (ESP)	Spain	+ 3' 38"

== Stage 22a ==
21 July 1968 - Auxerre to Melun, 136 km (85 mi)

Stage 22a result

Rank	Rider	Team	Time
1	Maurice Izier (FRA)	France C	3h 43' 56"
2	Herbert Wilde (FRG)	Germany	+ 2' 17"
3	Karl Brand (SUI)	Switzerland/Luxembourg	+ 5' 07"
4	Frans Brands (BEL)	Belgium A	+ 11' 10"
5	Franco Bitossi (ITA)	Italy	s.t.
6	Barry Hoban (GBR)	Great Britain	s.t.
7	Daniel Van Ryckeghem (BEL)	Belgium A	s.t.
8	Serge Bolley (FRA)	France B	s.t.
9	Rolf Wolfshohl (FRG)	Germany	s.t.
10	John Clarey (GBR)	Great Britain	s.t.

General classification after stage 22a

Rank	Rider	Team	Time
1	Herman Van Springel (BEL)	Belgium A	132h 29' 17"
2	Gregorio San Miguel (ESP)	Spain	+ 12"
3	Jan Janssen (NED)	Netherlands	+ 16"
4	Franco Bitossi (ITA)	Italy	+ 58"
5	Andrés Gandarias (ESP)	Spain	+ 1' 15"
6	Lucien Aimar (FRA)	France B	+ 1' 38"
7	Ferdinand Bracke (BEL)	Belgium B	+ 1' 56"
8	Rolf Wolfshohl (FRG)	Germany	+ 2' 12"
9	Roger Pingeon (FRA)	France A	+ 2' 28"
10	Antonio Gómez del Moral (ESP)	Spain	+ 3' 38"

== Stage 22b ==
21 July 1968 - Melun to Paris, 55.2 km (34.3 mi) (ITT)

Stage 22a result

Rank	Rider	Team	Time
1	Jan Janssen (NED)	Netherlands	1h 20' 09"
2	Herman Van Springel (BEL)	Belgium A	+ 54"
3	Roger Pingeon (FRA)	France A	+ 1' 17"
4	Ferdinand Bracke (BEL)	Belgium B	+ 1' 23"
5	Rolf Wolfshohl (FRG)	Germany	+ 1' 50"
6	Arie den Hartog (NED)	Netherlands	+ 2' 14"
7	Georges Pintens (BEL)	Belgium A	+ 2' 54"
8	Charly Grosskost (FRA)	France B	+ 3' 09"
9	Gregorio San Miguel (ESP)	Spain	+ 3' 21"
10	Lucien Aimar (FRA)	France B	+ 3' 22"

General classification after stage 22b

Rank	Rider	Team	Time
1	Jan Janssen (NED)	Netherlands	133h 49' 42"
2	Herman Van Springel (BEL)	Belgium A	+ 38"
3	Ferdinand Bracke (BEL)	Belgium B	+ 3' 03"
4	Gregorio San Miguel (ESP)	Spain	+ 3' 17"
5	Roger Pingeon (FRA)	France A	+ 3' 29"
6	Rolf Wolfshohl (FRG)	Germany	+ 3' 46"
7	Lucien Aimar (FRA)	France B	+ 4' 44"
8	Franco Bitossi (ITA)	Italy	+ 4' 59"
9	Andrés Gandarias (ESP)	Spain	+ 5' 05"
10	Ugo Colombo (ITA)	Italy	+ 7' 55"
