= 1967 Giro di Lombardia =

Race details
- Dates: 21 October 1967
- Stages: 1
- Distance: 266 km (165.3 mi)
- Winning time: 6h 54' 50"

Results
	Winner	Franco Bitossi (ITA)	(Filotex)
	Second	Felice Gimondi (ITA)	(Salvarani)
	Third	Raymond Poulidor (FRA)	(Mercier–Hutchinson–BP)

The 1967 Giro di Lombardia cycling race took place on 21 October 1967, and was won by Filotex's Franco Bitossi. It was the 61st edition of the Giro di Lombardia "monument" classic race.

== Results ==
	Cyclist	Team	Time
1	Franco Bitossi (ITA)	Filotex	6h 54' 50"
2	Felice Gimondi (ITA)	Salvarani	+31"
3	Raymond Poulidor (FRA)	Mercier–Hutchinson–BP	s.t.
4	Wladimiro Panizza (ITA)	Vittadello	s.t.
5	Adriano Passuello (ITA)	Molteni	s.t.
6	Eddy Merckx (BEL)	Peugeot–Michelin–BP	+51"
7	Guido De Rosso (ITA)	Vittadello	s.t.
8	Raymond Delisle (FRA)	Peugeot–Michelin–BP	+1' 01"
9	Jan Janssen (NED)	Pelforth–Sauvage–Lejeune	+1' 29"
10	Bernard Guyot (FRA)	Pelforth–Sauvage–Lejeune	+1' 31"
