= 1967 Paris–Tours =

Race details
- Dates: 8 October 1967
- Stages: 1
- Distance: 249 km (154.7 mi)
- Winning time: 5h 57' 30"

Results
	Winner	Rik Van Looy (BEL)
	Second	Barry Hoban (GBR)
	Third	José Samyn (FRA)

The 1967 Paris–Tours was the 61st edition of the Paris–Tours cycle race and was held on 8 October 1967. The race started in Paris and finished in Tours. The race was won by Rik Van Looy.

== General classification ==
Final general classification

Rank	Rider	Time
1	Rik Van Looy (BEL)	5h 57' 30"
2	Barry Hoban (GBR)	+ 0"
3	José Samyn (FRA)	+ 0"
4	Bernard Guyot (FRA)	+ 0"
5	Lucien Aimar (FRA)	+ 0"
6	Roger Pingeon (FRA)	+ 0"
7	Bart Zoet (NED)	+ 0"
8	Giancarlo Ferretti (ITA)	+ 0"
9	Jean Stablinski (FRA)	+ 0"
10	Luciano Dalla Bona (ITA)	+ 0"
