= 1967 Giro d'Italia =

Cycling race

Race details
- Dates: 20 May - 11 June 1967
- Stages: 22
- Distance: 3,572 km (2,220 mi)
- Winning time: 101h 05' 34"

Results
Jersey awarded to the overall winner	Winner	Felice Gimondi (ITA)	(Salvarani)
	Second	Franco Balmamion (ITA)	(Molteni)
	Third	Jacques Anquetil (FRA)	(Bic)
Jersey awarded to the points classification winner	Points	Dino Zandegù (ITA)	(Salvarani)
	Mountains	Aurelio González Puente (ESP)	(KAS)
	Team	KAS	

The 1967 Giro d'Italia was the 50th running of the Giro d'Italia, one of cycling's Grand Tour races. The Giro started in Treviglio, on 20 May, with a 135 km (83.9 mi) stage and concluded in Milan, on 11 June, with a 68 km (42.3 mi) split leg. A total of 130 riders from 13 teams entered the 22-stage race, which was won by Italian Felice Gimondi of the Salvarani team. The second and third places were taken by Italian Franco Balmamion and Frenchman Jacques Anquetil, respectively.

== Teams ==
Thirteen teams were invited by the race organizers to participate in the 1967 edition of the Giro d'Italia. Each team sent a squad of ten riders, which meant that the race started with a peloton of 130 cyclists. From the riders that began the race, 70 made it to the finish in Milan.

The teams entering the race were:

- Molteni
- Bic–Hutchinson
- Cynar
- Filotex
- Germanvox–Wega
- Kas–Kaskol
- Mainetti
- Max Meyer
- Peugeot–BP–Michelin
- Roméo–Smith's
- Salamini–Luxor TV
- Salvarani
- Vittadello

== Pre-race favorites ==
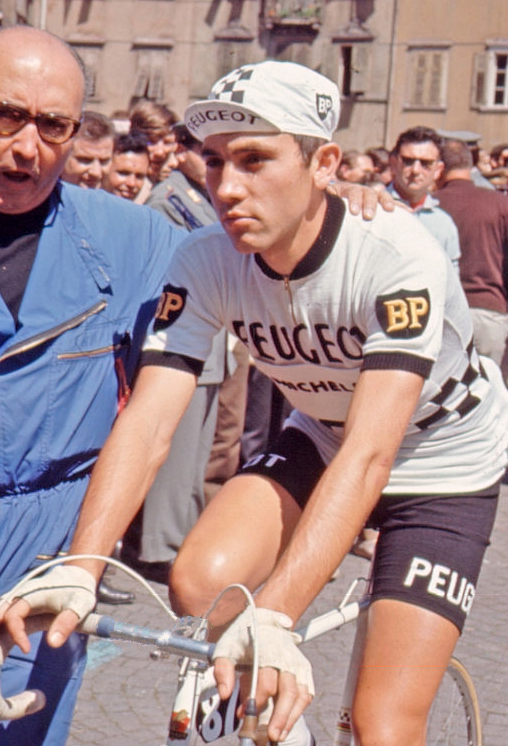
21 year old Eddy Merckx in his first Grand Tour, before the start of the 22nd stage

The starting peloton did include the 1966 winner, Gianni Motta. l'Unità writer Gino Sala named Felice Gimondi, Jacques Anquetil, Vittorio Adorni, Eddy Merckx, and Motta as the main contenders for the overall crown.

== Route and stages ==
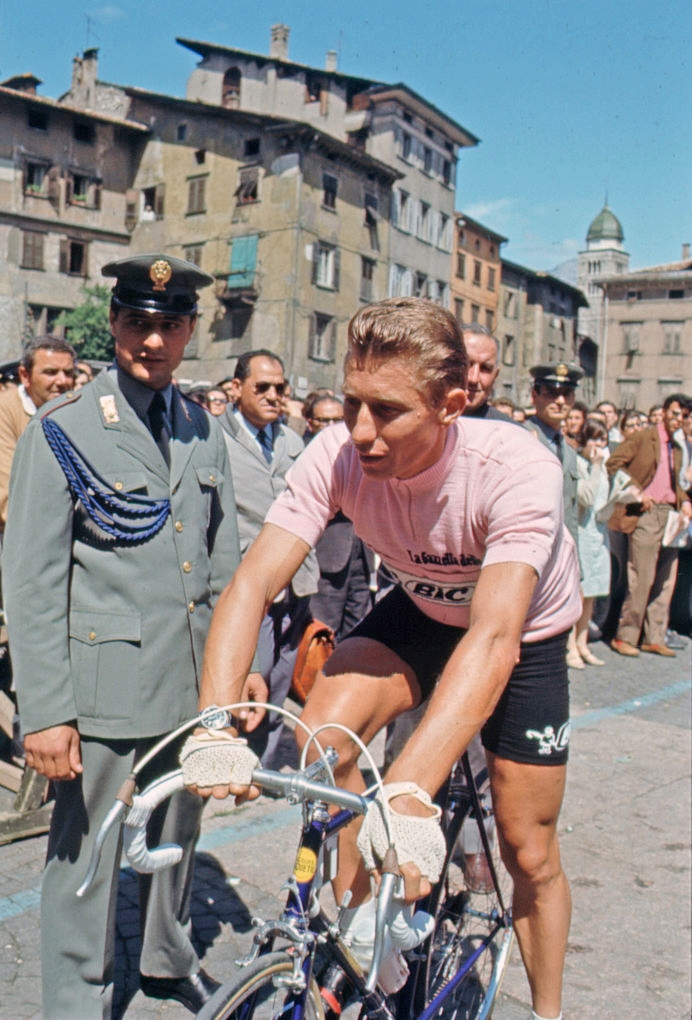
Jacques Anquetil wearing the pink jersey before the start of the 21st stage.

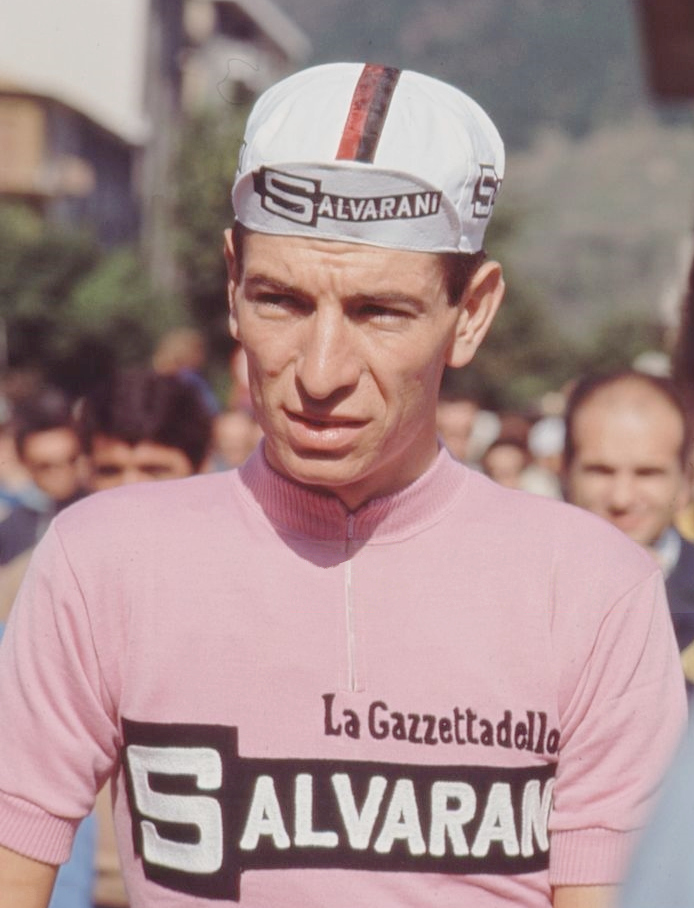
Felice Gimondi wearing the pink jersey at the start of the final stage.

The race route was revealed to the public on 28 March 1967 by race director Vincenzo Torriani. The route visited all Italian regions except for Sardinia. With the route entering Sicily for the fifth time in race history, the race scaled Mount Etna for the first time.

There were plans to hold a prelude the night before the first stage. This would have been 15 km, and would not have counted for the general classification, but the winner would have been allowed to wear the pink jersey on the first stage. The Italian Communist Party took the opportunity to protest against the bombing of Hanoi during the Vietnam War, and the prelude was cancelled.

Stage characteristics and winners
Stage	Date	Course	Distance	Type	Winner
1	20 May	Treviglio to Alessandria	135 km (84 mi)	Plain stage	Giorgio Zancanaro (ITA)
2	21 May	Alessandria to La Spezia	223 km (139 mi)	Stage with mountain(s)	Antonio Gómez del Moral (ESP)
3	22 May	La Spezia to Prato	205 km (127 mi)	Stage with mountain(s)	Michele Dancelli (ITA)
4	23 May	Florence to Chianciano Terme	155 km (96 mi)	Plain stage	Dino Zandegù (ITA)
5	24 May	Rome to Naples	220 km (137 mi)	Plain stage	Willy Planckaert (BEL)
6	25 May	Palermo to Palermo	63 km (39 mi)	Plain stage	Rudi Altig (GER)
7	26 May	Catania to Etna	169 km (105 mi)	Stage with mountain(s)	Franco Bitossi (ITA)
8	27 May	Reggio Calabria to Cosenza	218 km (135 mi)	Stage with mountain(s)	Jean Stablinski (FRA)
9	28 May	Cosenza to Taranto	202 km (126 mi)	Plain stage	Albert Van Vlierberghe (BEL)
10	29 May	Bari to Potenza	145 km (90 mi)	Plain stage	Willy Planckaert (BEL)
11	30 May	Potenza to Salerno	160 km (99 mi)	Stage with mountain(s)	Rudi Altig (GER)
12	31 May	Caserta to Blockhaus	220 km (137 mi)	Stage with mountain(s)	Eddy Merckx (BEL)
13	1 June	Chieti to Riccione	253 km (157 mi)	Plain stage	Georges Vandenberghe (BEL)
14	2 June	Riccione to Lido degli Estensi	94 km (58 mi)	Plain stage	Eddy Merckx (BEL)
15	3 June	Lido degli Estensi to Mantua	164 km (102 mi)	Plain stage	Michele Dancelli (ITA)
16	4 June	Mantua to Verona	45 km (28 mi)	Individual time trial	Ole Ritter (DEN)
	5 June	Rest day			
17	6 June	Verona to Vicenza	140 km (87 mi)	Stage with mountain(s)	Francisco Gabica (ESP)
18	7 June	Vicenza to Udine	167 km (104 mi)	Plain stage	Dino Zandegù (ITA)
19	8 June	Udine to Tre Cime di Lavaredo	170 km (106 mi)	Stage with mountain(s)	Stage Cancelled (Note: Stage 19 was cancelled because there were too many irregularities.)
20	9 June	Cortina d'Ampezzo to Trento	235 km (146 mi)	Stage with mountain(s)	Vittorio Adorni (ITA)
21	10 June	Trento to Tirano	153 km (95 mi)	Stage with mountain(s)	Marcello Mugnaini (ITA)
22a	11 June	Tirano to Madonna del Ghisallo	137 km (85 mi)	Stage with mountain(s)	Aurelio González (ESP)
22b	11 June	Madonna del Ghisallo to Milan	68 km (42 mi)	Plain stage	Willy Planckaert (BEL)
	Total		3,646 km (2,266 mi)		

== Race overview ==
The sixth leg saw an overnight ferry transfer from Palermo on mainland Italy to the island of Sicily for the next two stages. Following the sixth stage's conclusion the race took a five–hour train to Catania where the upcoming stage began. With the seventh stage hosting a summit finish to Mount Etna (1,892 m (6,207 ft)) it was hoped to be pivotal in the general classification race. However, due to the long transfers forced on the riders by organizer Torriani, the riders rode at a slow pace until the race's final three kilometers.

On the penultimate stage, Frenchman Anquetil was attacked several times. Felice Gimondi finally made the decisive attack, escaping alone and winning by four minutes. Jacques Anquetil considered himself robbed, claiming that Felice Gimondi had escaped by being taken away by the assistant race director's car. He finished third in the Giro, behind Felice Gimondi and Franco Balmamion. Jacques Anquetil's words were corroborated on his deathbed in 2012 by Giovanni Michelotti, the race director at the time.

== Classification leadership ==
Two leader's jerseys were worn during the 1967 Giro d'Italia. The leader of the general classification – calculated by adding the stage finish times of each rider – wore a pink jersey. This classification is the most important of the race, and its winner is considered as the winner of the Giro. There were no time bonuses in 1967.

For the points classification, which awarded a red jersey to its leader, cyclists were given points for finishing a stage in the top 15.

A major secondary classification was the mountains classification. In this ranking, points were won by reaching the summit of a climb ahead of other cyclists. There were three categories of mountains. The first category awarded 50, 40, 30, 20, and 10 points, the second distributed 40, 30, 20, and 10 points, and the third category gave 30, 20, and 10 points. The highest climb of the Giro was designated as Cima Coppi, and gave 200, 100, 80, 70 and 50 points.

There was also an intermediate sprints classification.

Although no jersey was awarded, there was also one classification for the teams. Here riders scored points for their teams for a high stage finish, leading the general classification, or beging amongst the first riders at a mountain pass or intermediate sprint.

Classification leadership by stage
Stage	Winner	General classification	Points classification	Mountains classification	Team classification
1	Giorgio Zancanaro	Giorgio Zancanaro	Giorgio Zancanaro	not awarded	Max Meyer
2	Antonio Gómez del Moral	Antonio Gómez del Moral	Giorgio Zancanaro	Silvano Schiavon	KAS-Kaskol
3	Michele Dancelli	Antonio Gómez del Moral	Michele Dancelli	Aurelio González Puente	Vitadello
4	Dino Zandegù	Antonio Gómez del Moral	Dino Zandegù	Aurelio González Puente	Vitadello
5	Willy Planckaert	Michele Dancelli	Michele Dancelli	Aurelio González Puente	Vitadello
6	Rudi Altig	Michele Dancelli	Michele Dancelli	Aurelio González Puente	Vitadello
7	Franco Bitossi	Michele Dancelli	Michele Dancelli	Aurelio González Puente	Vitadello
8	Jean Stablinski	José Pérez Frances	Michele Dancelli	Aurelio González Puente	Vitadello
9	Albert Van Vlierberghe	José Pérez Frances	Dino Zandegù	Aurelio González Puente	Vitadello
10	Willy Planckaert	José Pérez Frances	Dino Zandegù	Aurelio González Puente	Vitadello
11	Rudi Altig	José Pérez Frances	Dino Zandegù	Aurelio González Puente	Vitadello
12	Eddy Merckx	José Pérez Frances	Dino Zandegù	Aurelio González Puente	KAS-Kaskol
13	Georges Vandenberghe	José Pérez Frances	Dino Zandegù	Aurelio González Puente	KAS-Kaskol
14	Eddy Merckx	José Pérez Frances	Dino Zandegù	Aurelio González Puente	KAS-Kaskol
15	Michele Dancelli	José Pérez Frances	Dino Zandegù	Aurelio González Puente	Vitadello
16	Ole Ritter	Jacques Anquetil	Dino Zandegù	Aurelio González Puente	KAS-Kaskol
17	Francisco Gabica	Silvano Schiavon	Dino Zandegù	Aurelio González Puente	KAS-Kaskol
18	Dino Zandegù	Silvano Schiavon	Dino Zandegù	Aurelio González Puente	Vitadello
19	Stage Cancelled	Silvano Schiavon	Dino Zandegù	Aurelio González Puente	Vitadello
20	Vittorio Adorni	Jacques Anquetil	Dino Zandegù	Aurelio González Puente	KAS-Kaskol
21	Marcello Mugnaini	Felice Gimondi	Dino Zandegù	Aurelio González Puente	KAS-Kaskol
22a	Aurelio González	Felice Gimondi	Dino Zandegù	Aurelio González Puente	KAS-Kaskol
22b	Willy Planckaert	Felice Gimondi	Dino Zandegù	Aurelio González Puente	KAS-Kaskol
Final		Felice Gimondi	Dino Zandegù	Aurelio González Puente	KAS-Kaskol

== Final standings ==
Legend
Pink jersey	Denotes the winner of the General classification
Red jersey	Denotes the winner of the Points classification

=== General classification ===
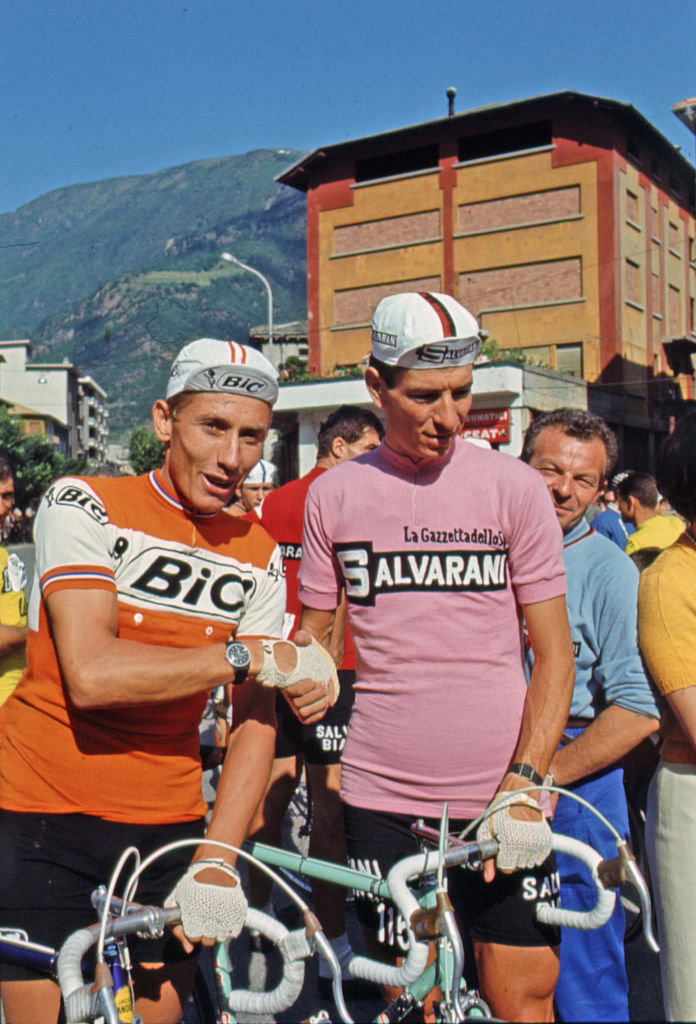
Jacques Anquetil, third in his last Giro, shakes the hand of winner Felice Gimondi

Final general classification (1–10)
Rank	Name	Team	Time
1	Felice Gimondi (ITA)	Salvarani	101h 05' 34"
2	Franco Balmamion (ITA)	Molteni	+ 3' 36"
3	Jacques Anquetil (FRA)	Bic	+ 3' 45"
4	Vittorio Adorni (ITA)	Salamini	+ 4' 33"
5	José Pérez Frances (ESP)	KAS	+ 5' 17"
6	Gianni Motta (ITA)	Molteni	+ 6' 21"
7	Lucien Aimar (FRA)	Bic	+ 7' 25"
8	Francisco Gabica (ESP)	KAS	+ 9' 43"
9	Eddy Merckx (BEL)	Peugeot	+ 11' 41"
10	Eusebio Vélez (ESP)	KAS	+ 15' 00"

=== Mountains classification ===
Final mountains classification (1–7)
	Name	Team	Points
1	Aurelio González (ESP)	KAS	460
2	Lucien Aimar (FRA)	Bic	90
3	Franco Bitossi (ITA)	Salvarani	80
3	Eddy Merckx (BEL)	Peugeot	80
3	Felice Gimondi (ITA)	Salvarani	80
3	Vittorio Adorni (ITA)	Salvarani	80
7	Wladimiro Panizza (ITA)	Vittadello	70

=== Points classification ===
Final points classification (1–5)
	Name	Team	Points
1	Dino Zandegù (ITA)	Salvarani	180
2	Eddy Merckx (BEL)	Peugeot	164
3	Willy Planckaert (BEL)	Romeo-Smith's	150
4	Vittorio Adorni (ITA)	Salvarani	102
5	José Pérez Frances (ESP)	KAS	89

=== Team classification ===
Final team classification (1–10)
	Team	Points
1	KAS	4,176
2	Vittadello	3,418
3	Salvarani	3,254
4	Molteni	2,606
5	Romeo-Smith's	2,584
6	Salamini	1,990
7	Bic	1,558
8	Filotex	1,424
9	Peugeot	1,394
10	Max-Meyer	1,048
