= André Desvages =

French cyclist (1944–2018)

Personal information
- Full name: André Desvages
- Born: 12 March 1944 Graye-sur-Mer, France
- Died: 1 June 2018 (aged 74)

Cycling career
- Sport: Cycling
- Discipline: Road
- Role: Rider

Major wins
- 1 stage 1968 Tour de France

André Desvages (12 March 1944 – 1 June 2018) was a French professional road bicycle racer. His sporting career began with C.S.M. Puteaux. Desvages' short professional cycling career, from 1967 to 1970, is mostly remembered for his 5A stage win in the 1968 Tour de France. After his cycling career he became technical director of the new Gitane team, and he signed a young Bernard Hinault. He competed in the team time trial at the 1964 Summer Olympics.

== Major results ==
1965
Paris –Troyes
1968
Tour de France:

Winner stage 5A
