= Edouard Weckx =

Belgian cyclist

Personal information
- Born: 15 May 1945 (age 81)

Cycling career
- Sport: Cycling
- Role: Rider

Edouard Weckx (born 15 May 1945) is a Belgian racing cyclist. He rode in the 1968 Tour de France.
