= Karl Brand =

Swiss cyclist

Personal information
- Born: 30 January 1941 (age 85) Seedorf, Bern, Switzerland

Cycling career
- Sport: Cycling
- Role: Rider

Karl Brand (born 30 January 1941) is a Swiss former racing cyclist. He was the Swiss National Road Race champion in 1968. He also rode in the 1967 and 1968 Tour de France.
