= Roland Smaniotto =

Luxembourgish cyclist

Personal information
- Born: 17 July 1946
- Died: 12 June 2011 (aged 64)

Cycling career
- Sport: Cycling
- Role: Rider

Roland Smaniotto (17 July 1946 – 12 June 2011) was a Luxembourgish racing cyclist. He rode in the 1968 Tour de France.
