= Maurice Izier =

French cyclist

Personal information
- Full name: Maurice Izier
- Born: March 18, 1944 (age 82) Crest, France

Cycling career
- Sport: Cycling
- Discipline: Road
- Role: Rider

Major wins
- 1 stage 1968 Tour de France

Maurice Izier (Crest, 18 March 1944) was a French professional road bicycle racer. Izier won stage 22A of the 1968 Tour de France.

== Major results ==
1965
Circuit de Lorraine
1966
Circuit d'Auvergne
1967
Sanvignes
1968
Avenches
Tour de France:

Winner stage 22A

1970
Entrains
