= Georges Chappe =

French cyclist (born 1944)

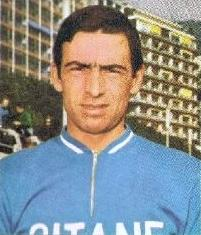

Personal information
- Full name: Georges Chappe
- Born: 5 March 1944 (age 82) Marseille, France

Cycling career
- Sport: Cycling
- Discipline: Road
- Role: Rider

Major wins
- Critérium International (1970)

Georges Chappe (born 5 March 1944) is a retired cyclist from France, who was nicknamed Jojo during his professional career. He was a professional from 1965 to 1975. In 1970 he won the Critérium International. In 1968, Chappe won a stage in the Tour de France, but in 1971 he was the lanterne rouge. He also competed in the team time trial at the 1964 Summer Olympics.

== Major results ==
1963
World amateur championship team time trial (100km) (with Michel Bechet, Marcel-Ernest Bidault and Dominique Motte)
1965
Promotion Pernod
Sanvignes
Plonéour-Lavern
1967
Paris–Camembert
1968
Tour de France:

Winner stage 4

1969
Grand-Bourg
1970
Critérium International
GP Petit Varois
Paris–Camembert
1972
Lamballe
Vailly-sur-Sauldre
