= Aurelio González Puente =

Spanish cyclist (born 1940)

Personal information
- Full name: Aurelio González Puente
- Born: 26 July 1940 (age 86) Valle de Villaverde, Spain

Cycling career
- Sport: Cycling
- Current team: Retired
- Discipline: Road
- Role: Rider
- Rider type: Climbing specialist

Professional team
- 1964–1970: KAS-Kaskol

Major wins
- Grand Tours Tour de France Mountains classification (1968) 1 individual stage (1968) Giro d'Italia Mountains classification (1967) 1 individual stage (1967)

Aurelio González Puente (born 26 July 1940) is a Spanish former road bicycle racer who won the Mountains classification in the 1968 Tour de France and the Mountains classification in the 1967 Giro d'Italia. He also won stages in the Tour de France, Giro d'Italia, Tour de Suisse and Dauphiné Libéré.

== Major results ==
1967
Giro d'Italia

1st Mountains classification
1st Stage 22a

3rd Overall Vuelta a España
1968
Tour de France

1st Mountains classification
1st Stage 6
