= Serge Bolley =

French cyclist

Personal information
- Born: 3 December 1944 (age 81) Villeurbanne, France

Cycling career
- Sport: Cycling
- Discipline: Road
- Role: Rider

Professional teams
- 1967–1971: Bic–Hutchinson
- 1972: Gitane–Campagnolo

Serge Bolley (born 3 December 1944) is a French former professional cyclist.

== Biography ==
Serge was born in Villeurbanne, France on December 3, 1944. He participated in three Tour de France editions.

== Career ==
In addition to his stage victory in the Vuelta a Mallorca in 1967, he took third place in the fourth stage of the 1968 Tour de France. In 1969, he finished second in the fifth stage of the Tour of Spain. He was teammate of Jacques Anquetil. His last result was 39th place in stage 14b during the 1972 Tour de France.

== Major results ==
1966
2nd Overall Circuit de la Sarthe
2nd Tour du Vaucluse
1967
1st Stage 1 Vuelta a Mallorca
1970
1st Stage 1 Volta a Catalunya

=== Grand Tour results ===
==== Tour de France ====
- 1968: 59th
- 1969: DNF (2nd stage)
- 1972: DNF (16th stage)

==== Vuelta a España ====
- 1967: 68th
- 1969: 36th

==== Giro d'Italia ====
- 1968: 23rd
