= Georges Vandenberghe =

Belgian cyclist

- Vandenberghe during the 1970 Tour de France

Personal information
- Full name: Georges Vandenberghe
- Born: 28 December 1941 Belgium
- Died: 23 September 1983 (aged 41)

Cycling career
- Sport: Cycling
- Discipline: Road
- Role: Rider

Major wins
- Carrying yellow jersey for 11 days

Georges Vandenberghe (Oostrozebeke, 28 December 1941 — Bruges, 23 September 1983) was a professional Belgian cyclist.

Vandenberghe participated in 7 Tours de France between 1965 and 1971. His best tour was the 1968 Tour de France, where he wore the yellow jersey for 11 days, and finished 18th in the overall classification.

== Major results ==
1961
Tour du Hainaut
1962
Omloop van de Westhoek
1963
Moorsele
Anzegem
Schoonaarde
Ruiselede
1964
Moorsele
Omloop der Zuid-West-Vlaamse Bergen
Volta a Portugal:

Winner 4 stages
Winner points classification

Westrozebeke
Sint-Andries
1966
Tour de France:

Winner stage 13

1967
Flèche Enghiennoise
Machelen
Ronde van Oost-Vlaanderen
Giro d'Italia:

Winner stage 13

1968
Assebroek
1970
GP du Tournaisis
1971
Sirault
