= Jean-Pierre Genet =

French cyclist (1940–2005)

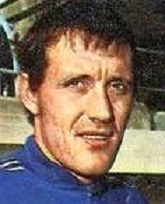

Personal information
- Full name: Jean-Pierre Genet
- Nickname: Bouton d'Or
- Born: 24 October 1940 Brest, France
- Died: 16 March 2005 (aged 64) Loctudy, France

Cycling career
- Sport: Cycling
- Discipline: Road
- Role: Rider

Major wins
- Three stages Tour de France

Jean-Pierre Genet (24 October 1940, in Brest – 16 March 2005, in Loctudy) was a professional road bicycle racer from Brest, France from 1964 to 1976. During this time he stayed with one cycling team, the Mercier team of Raymond Poulidor. He rode 13 editions of the Tour de France where he won three stages, once each in 1968, 1971 and 1974. He wore the yellow jersey as leader of the general classification for one day in the 1968 Tour de France. In 1967, Genet was the Lanterne rouge (last finishing cyclist) in the Tour de France.

== Major results ==
1965
Plélan-le-Petit
1966
Plémy
1968
Tour de France:

Winner stage 17
Wearing yellow jersey for one day

1970
Circuit des Boucles de la Seine
Quimperlé
1971
Tour de France:

Winner stage 4

1972
Bagneux
1973
Excideuil
1974
Tour de France:

Winner stage 14
