= Georges Pintens =

Belgian cyclist

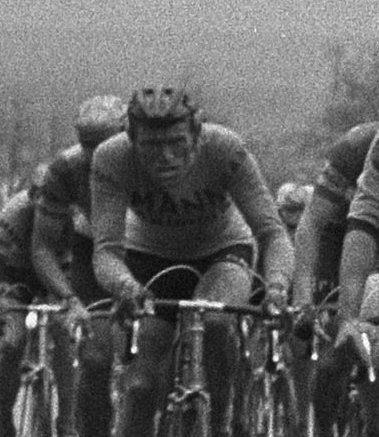
- Wielrenners in aktie, Georges Pintens, Bestanddeelnr 923-4697

Personal information
- Full name: Georges Pintens
- Born: 15 October 1946 (age 80) Antwerp, Belgium

Cycling career
- Sport: Cycling
- Discipline: Road
- Role: Rider

Georges Pintens (born 15 October 1946 in Antwerp) is a former professional road bicycle racer from Belgium who excelled at one-day classic races during the 1960s and 1970s.

Pintens most successful year was in 1971 when he captured the Belgian classic, Gent–Wevelgem, and the overall title at the Tour de Suisse but finished second to Eddy Merckx at Liège–Bastogne–Liège.

In 1974, Pintens returned to win Liège–Bastogne–Liège.

== Major results ==
1969 – Mann-Grundig

- 1st, Rund um den Henninger Turm

1970 – Mann-Grundig

- 1st, Amstel Gold Race

1971 – Hertekamp-Magniflex

- 1st, Gent–Wevelgem
- 1st overall, Tour de Suisse
- 2nd, Liège–Bastogne–Liège

1972 – Van Cauter-Magniflex-de Gribaldy

- 1st, GP Kanton Aargau

1973 – Rokado

- 1st, Rund um den Henninger Turm
- 1st, Ruta del Sol
- 1st, Prologue, Tour of Belgium

1974 – MIC-Ludo-de Gribaldy

- 1st, Liège–Bastogne–Liège

1975 – Maes-Watney
1976 – Miko-de Gribaldy-Superia

- 1st, Stage, Vuelta a España

== Tour de France record ==
- 1968 – 12th overall and 1st, Stage 12 (Pau > Saint-Gaudens)
- 1970 – 10th overall
