= Jean Dumont (cyclist) =

French cyclist (born 1943)

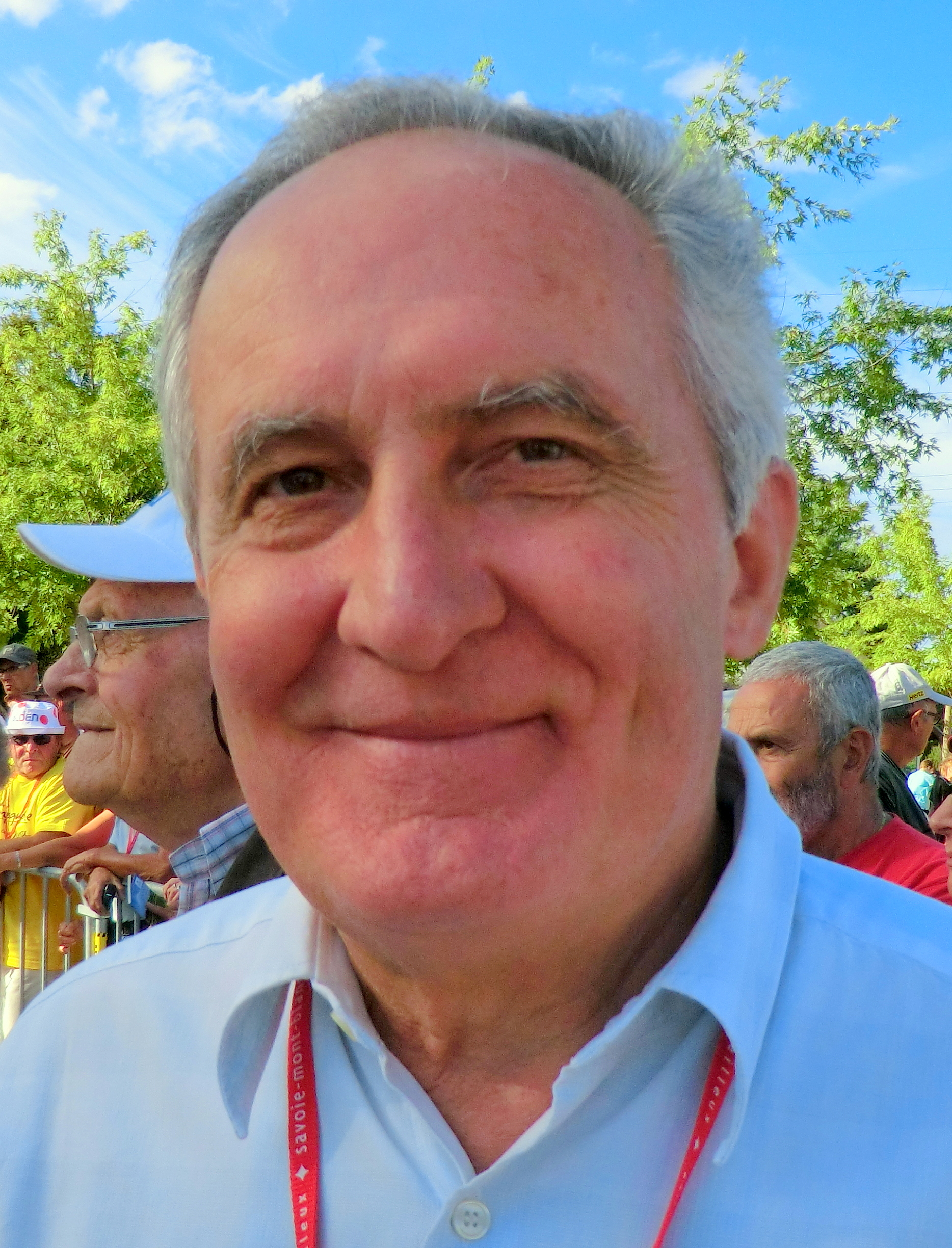

Personal information
- Full name: Jean Dumont
- Born: August 14, 1943 (age 83) Ambérieu-en-Bugey, France

Cycling career
- Sport: Cycling
- Discipline: Road
- Role: Rider

Major wins
- 1 stage Tour de France

Jean Dumont (born 14 August 1943 in Ambérieu-en-Bugey, Ain) is a French former professional road bicycle racer. His sporting career began with A.S.E.B Lyon. Dumont won stage 5B of the 1968 Tour de France.

== Major results ==
1963
France national amateur road race champion
GP de France
1965
Boucles Pertuisiennes
Boussac
1968
Tour de France:

Winner stage 5B

Auzances
