= Jean-Pierre Ducasse =

French cyclist

Personal information
- Full name: Jean-Pierre Ducasse
- Born: July 16, 1944 Paris, France
- Died: February 19, 1969 (aged 24) Villeneuve-Loubet, France

Cycling career
- Sport: Cycling
- Discipline: Road/Cyclocross
- Role: Rider

Professional team
- 1967–1969: Pelforth

Jean-Pierre Ducasse, was a professional French cyclist, who finished second in the 1967 Vuelta a España, and died in 1969 due to carbon monoxide poisoning.

== Biography ==
Ducasse became French national champion cyclo-cross in 1967, and was offered a contract for the Pelforth team. He joined the 1967 Vuelta a España in support of Jan Janssen.

=== 1967 Vuelta a España ===
During that Vuelta, Ducasse was in escape groups in the fourth and fifth stage, and became the leader in the general classification. In the mountains, other cyclists attacked, but with the help from Janssen, Ducasse was able to keep his time losses limited. It was different in the individual time trials: Ducasse lost 11 minutes in the first time trial, but he could afford this and was still the leader. In the second time trial, the penultimate stage, Ducasse lost time again, and this time his team leader Janssen took over the lead. Ducasse finished the Vuelta in second place, and was the surprise of this Vuelta.

=== Death ===
While training in South France, in early 1969, Ducasse slept in a hotel room together with cyclist Michel Bon. The heating was defect, and both died of carbon monoxide poisoning.

== Palmares ==
1967
French national cyclocross champion
Vuelta a España: 2nd place

1968
French national cyclocross champion
Vuelta a España: 12th place
Tour de France: 31st place
