= Charly Grosskost =

French cyclist

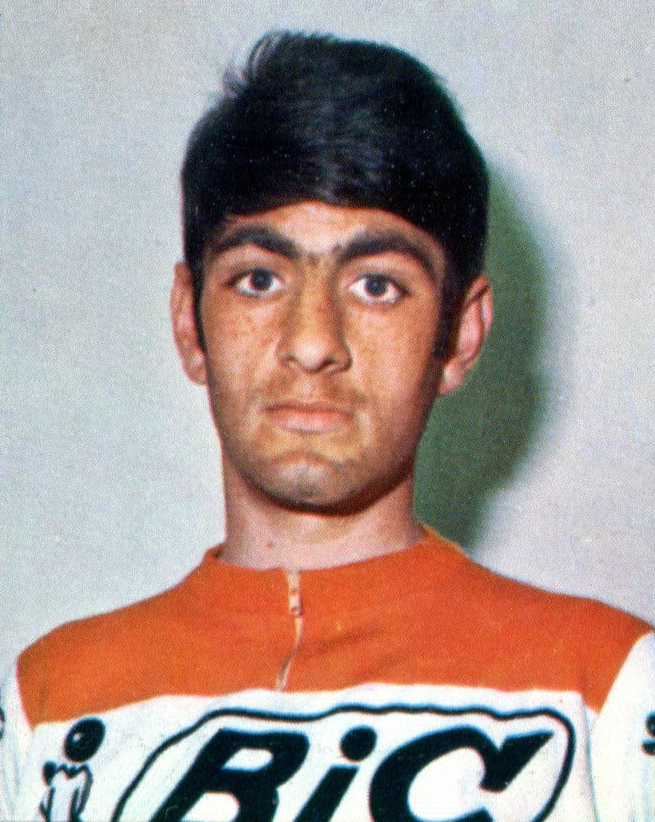
- Charly Grosskost c. 1968

Personal information
- Full name: Charly Grosskost
- Born: 5 March 1944 Eckbolsheim, German-occupied France
- Died: 19 June 2004 (aged 60) Strasbourg, France

Cycling career
- Sport: Cycling
- Disciplines: Road; Track
- Role: Rider
- Rider type: Time trialist

Professional teams
- 1966–1967: Peugeot–BP–Michelin
- 1968–1972: Bic
- 1973: Gan–Mercier–Hutchinson
- 1974: Jobo–Lejeune

Major wins
- Grand Tours Tour de France 2 individual stages (1968) Giro d'Italia 1 individual stage (1968)

Charly Grosskost (5 March 1944 – 19 June 2004) was a French racing cyclist who, in 1968, won the prologue time trial of both the Giro d'Italia and the Tour de France. He won stages of the Tour de France and the Giro d'Italia, and on the track, he was French pursuit champion nine times. His sporting career began with A.C.B.B. Paris.

== Early career ==
Grosskost came to notice when he was 19, when he won a stage of the Route de France – amateur counterpart of the Tour de France – and then won Strasbourg-Campagne by nearly 10 minutes after riding ahead of the race for more than 50 km. In 1965, he won the Route de France and five of its seven stages and became favourite for the still bigger race, the Tour de l'Avenir. There, however, he dropped out in the Pyrenees. A drug test that followed his retirement – it has entered cycling legend that other riders pushed him off his bike for his own safety as he began foaming at the mouth and riding erratically – led to his being suspended for a year. To his death, Grosskost insisted that he had been drugged by a team helper.

== Professional career ==
Grosskost turned professional for Peugeot on 1 May 1966, alongside Eddy Merckx of Belgium, whom he beat to win his Giro prologue. He then moved to the Bic team alongside Jacques Anquetil.

In 1968 he won the prologue of the Giro d'Italia and became the third Frenchman to wear the leader's pink jersey after Louison Bobet and Raphaël Géminiani. That same year, Grosskost won the prologue time-trial of the Tour de France at Vittel and then the first conventional stage. He wore the leader's yellow jersey for three days and finished the Tour in 17th place.

== Post-career ==
In retirement he became a cycle dealer.

Grosskost died in 2004, after he was hit by a car while cycling with friends.

== Major results ==
1965
1st Overall Route de France

1st Stages 1, 2, 4 & 5

3rd Overall Tour d'Eure-et-Loir
1966
8th Critérium des As
1967
2nd Grand Prix de Cannes
1968
Tour de France

1st Prologue & Stage 1
Held for 2 days

1st Prologue Giro d'Italia
2nd Milan–San Remo
6th Overall Paris–Nice

1st Prologue

7th Critérium National de la Route
9th Overall Tour de l'Oise
1970
2nd Grand Prix de Saint-Raphaël
3rd Overall GP du Midi Libre
6th Critérium des As
7th Critérium National de la Route
1971
1st Prologue & Stage 4 Four Days of Dunkirk
1972
1st Prologue & Stage 3b Étoile des Espoirs
1st Prologue Tour de l'Oise
8th Overall Four Days of Dunkirk
1973
7th Overall Paris–Nice

=== Track ===
1966
1st Pursuit, National Championships
1967
1st Omnium, National Championships
1968
National Championships

1st Pursuit
1st Omnium

1969
1st Pursuit, National Championships
1970
1st Pursuit, National Championships
1974
1st Pursuit, National Championships

== See also ==
- List of doping cases in cycling
