= Arie den Hartog =

Dutch cyclist

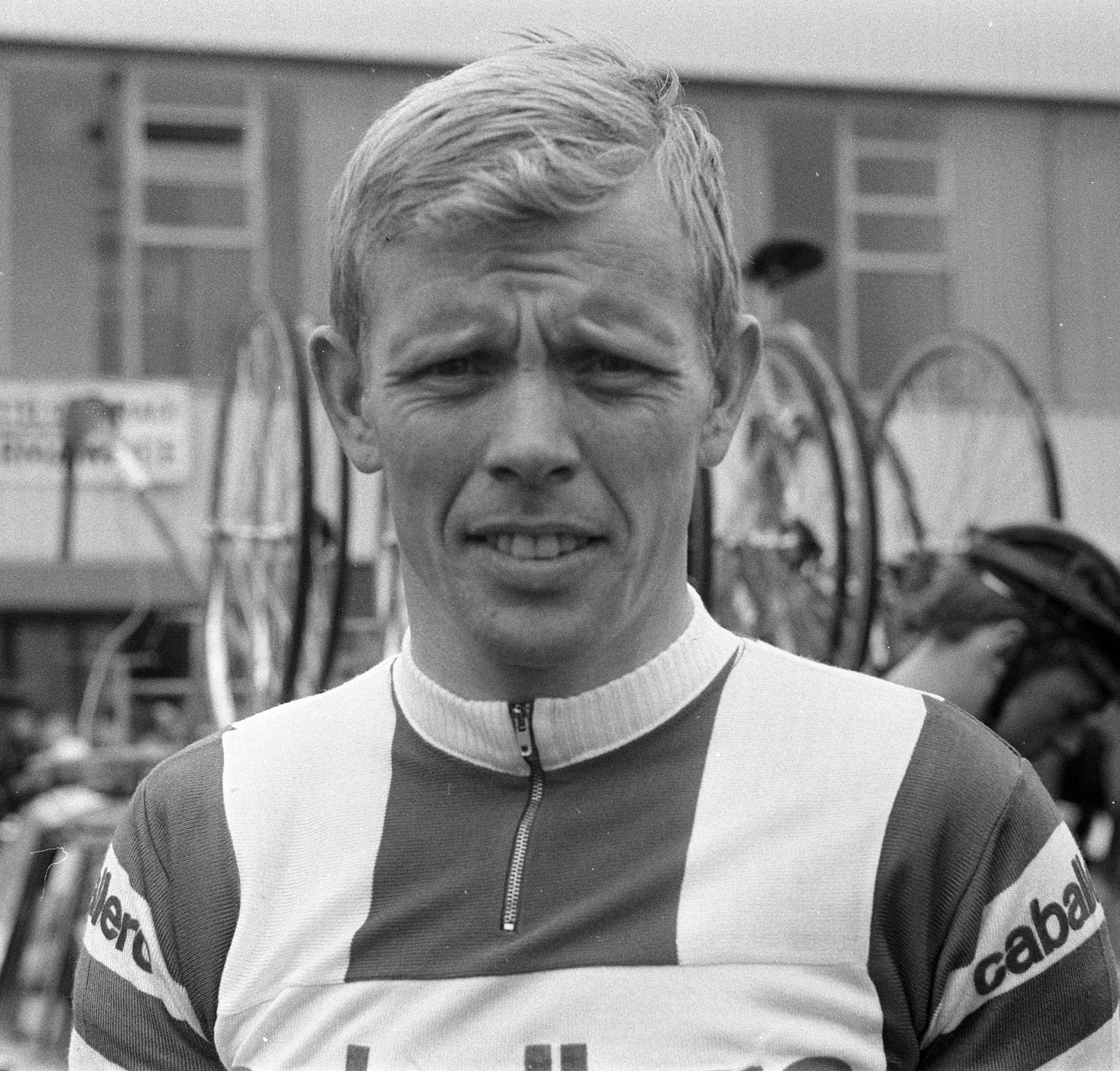

Personal information
- Full name: Arie den Hartog
- Born: 23 April 1941 Zuidland, Netherlands
- Died: 7 June 2018 (aged 77)

Cycling career
- Sport: Cycling
- Current team: Retired
- Discipline: Road
- Role: Rider

Professional teams
- 1964: Saint-Raphael-Gitane
- 1965: Ford France-Gitane
- 1966: Ford France-Geminiani
- 1967: Bic
- 1968–1969: Caballero
- 1970: Caballero-Laurens

Major wins
- Amstel Gold Race (1967); Milan–San Remo (1965); Tour de Luxembourg (1964); Volta a Catalunya (1966)
Medal record
Representing Netherlands
Men's road bicycle racing
World Championships
Bronze medal – third place	1962 Salò	Amateur's Road Race

Arie den Hartog (23 April 1941 – 7 June 2018) was a Dutch road bicycle racer. Den Hartog won the Milan–San Remo Classic in 1965, as well as the Amstel Gold Race in 1967.
