= Adriano Passuello =

Italian cyclist

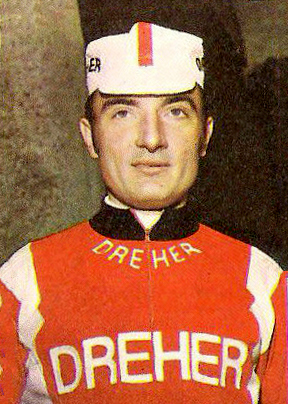

Personal information
- Born: 3 November 1942 (age 83) Schiavon, Italy

Sport
- Sport: Cycling

Adriano Passuello (born 3 November 1942) is an Italian retired professional road cyclist. He rode the Tour de France in 1968 and 1976 and Giro d'Italia in 1968–1974. He won the Giro della Valle d'Aosta in 1964 and the Tour of Tessin in 1967.
