= Bernard Guyot =

French cyclist (1945–2021)

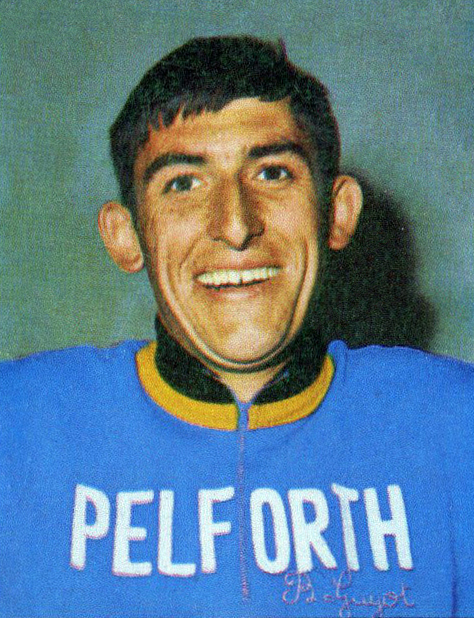
- Bernard Guyot in 1968

Personal information
- Born: 19 November 1945 Savigny-sur-Orge, France
- Died: 28 February 2021 (aged 75)

Cycling career
- Sport: Cycling
- Discipline: Road
- Role: Rider

Amateur team
- U.S. Creteil

Professional teams
- 1967–1968: Pelforth–Sauvage–Lejeune
- 1969–1973: Sonolor–Lejeune
- 1974: Magiglace–Juaneda

Bernard Guyot (19 November 1945 – 28 February 2021) was a French road cyclist. His sporting career began with U.S. Creteil. As an amateur he competed in the individual road race at the 1964 Summer Olympics, won the Peace Race in 1966, and placed fourth in the team time trial at the 1966 UCI Road World Championships. In 1967 he turned professional and won 10 races before retiring in 1974. He raced the Tour de France in 1968-1972, placing 27th in 1968 and 28th in 1971. In the national professional road championship, Guyot placed second in 1972 and third in 1969. His father Bernard Sr. and brothers Claude and Serge were also competitive cyclists.

Guyot died on 1 March 2021, aged 75.

== Major results ==
1964
1st Overall Tour de Namur

1st Stage 3

1st Stage 14 Tour du Maroc
1965
2nd Overall Flèche du Sud
10th Overall Tour de l'Avenir

1st Stages 7 & 13 (ITT)

1966
1st Overall Peace Race

1st Stage 3a

4th Overall Tour de l'Avenir

1st Stage 7 (ITT)

1967
1st Overall Circuit du Morbihan

1st Stage 1

1st Tour de l'Herault
2nd Overall Paris–Nice

1st Stage 8 (ITT)

2nd Trofeo Baracchi (with Jacques Anquetil)
2nd Coppa Agostoni
2nd GP Lugano (ITT)
3rd Overall Four Days of Dunkirk

1st Stage 2b (ITT)

3rd Overall Paris–Luxembourg
4th Overall Grand Prix du Midi Libre
4th Critérium National de la Route
5th Overall Euskal Bizikleta

1st Stage 4

5th Paris-Tours
7th Overall Tour de l'Oise
8th Overall Volta a Catalunya

1st Stage 5a

8th GP Monaco
10th Giro di Lombardia
1968
1st Circuit d'Auvergne
2nd Grand Prix de Fayt-le-Franc
3rd Maël–Pestivien
4th Overall Paris–Nice
8th Liège–Bastogne–Liège
1969
1st Boucles de la Seine
3rd Road race, National Road Championships
3rd Overall Tour de l'Oise
4th Baden–Baden
9th GP Monaco
10th Critérium National de la Route
1970
8th Boucles de la Seine
9th Bordeaux–Paris
1972
2nd Road race, National Road Championships
