= List of teams and cyclists in the 1967 Tour de France =

List of cyclists

The 1967 Tour de France started with 130 cyclists, divided into 13 teams of 10 cyclists.

Eight teams were pure national teams:

- France
- Germany
- Belgium
- Spain
- Great Britain
- Italy
- Netherlands
- Switzerland/Luxembourg (combined)

And five teams were additional national teams:

- Red devils (young Belgian cyclists)
- Esperanza (young Spanish cyclists)
- Primavera (young Italian cyclists)
- Bleuets de France (young French cyclists)
- Coqs de France (young French cyclists)

== Start list ==
=== By team ===
France
No.	Rider	Pos.
1	Lucien Aimar (FRA)	6
2	Édouard Delberghe (FRA)	83
3	André Foucher (FRA)	46
4	Jean-Pierre Genet (FRA)	88
5	Paul Lemeteyer (FRA)	78
6	Anatole Novak (FRA)	DNF
7	Roger Pingeon (FRA)	1
8	Raymond Poulidor (FRA)	9
9	Raymond Riotte (FRA)	72
10	Jean Stablinski (FRA)	81

Germany
No.	Rider	Pos.
11	Winfried Bölke (FRG)	DNF
12	Peter Glemser (FRG)	DNF
13	Hans Junkermann (FRG)	11
14	Karl-Heinz Kunde (FRG)	DNF
15	Horst Oldenburg (FRG)	DNF
16	Wilfried Peffgen (FRG)	DNF
17	Dieter Puschel (FRG)	DNF
18	Dieter Wiedemann (FRG)	52
19	Herbert Wilde (FRG)	63
20	Rolf Wolfshohl (FRG)	31

Belgium
No.	Rider	Pos.
21	Frans Brands (BEL)	13
22	Jos Huysmans (BEL)	8
23	Willy Monty (BEL)	12
24	Willy Planckaert (BEL)	DNF
25	Jozef Spruyt (BEL)	47
26	Georges Vandenberghe (BEL)	45
27	Martin Van Den Bossche (BEL)	59
28	Rik Van Looy (BEL)	DNF
29	Willy Van Neste (BEL)	DNF
30	Herman Van Springel (BEL)	24

Spain
No.	Rider	Pos.
31	Jaime Alomar Florit (ESP)	DNF
32	Mariano Díaz (ESP)	DNF
33	José María Errandonea (ESP)	DNF
34	Ginés García Perán (ESP)	18
35	Julio Jiménez (ESP)	2
36	José Manuel López (ESP)	33
37	Luis Otaño (ESP)	DNF
38	Ramón Sáez Marzo (ESP)	85
39	Luis Pedro Santamarina (ESP)	49
40	Valentín Uriona (ESP)	DNF

Great Britain
No.	Rider	Pos.
41	Peter Chisman (GBR)	DNF
42	Vin Denson (GBR)	DNF
43	Peter Hill (GBR)	DNF
44	Albert Hitchen (GBR)	DNF
45	Barry Hoban (GBR)	62
46	Bill Lawrie (AUS)	DNF
47	Colin Lewis (GBR)	84
48	Arthur Metcalfe (GBR)	69
49	Tom Simpson (GBR)	DNF
50	Michaël Wright (GBR)	DNF

Italy
No.	Rider	Pos.
51	Carlo Chiappano (ITA)	DNF
52	Ugo Colombo (ITA)	34
53	Luciano Dalla Bona (ITA)	65
54	Adriano Durante (ITA)	80
55	Giancarlo Ferretti (ITA)	68
56	Felice Gimondi (ITA)	7
57	Mario Minieri (ITA)	87
58	Guido Marcello Mugnaini (ITA)	DNF
59	Roberto Poggiali (ITA)	27
60	Flaviano Vicentini (ITA)	32

Netherlands
No.	Rider	Pos.
61	Jo de Roo (NED)	76
62	Cees Haast (NED)	14
63	Huub Harings (NED)	75
64	Jan Janssen (NED)	5
65	Gerben Karstens (NED)	30
66	Bas Maliepaard (NED)	DNF
67	Henk Nijdam (NED)	DNF
68	Wim Schepers (NED)	25
69	Jos van der Vleuten (NED)	67
70	Huub Zilverberg (NED)	71

Switzerland/Luxembourg
No.	Rider	Pos.
71	René Binggeli (SUI)	55
72	Francis Blanc (SUI)	86
73	Rodolf Hauser (SUI)	DNF
74	Bernard Vifian (SUI)	73
75	Louis Pfenninger (SUI)	70
76	Alfred Rüegg (SUI)	35
77	Johny Schleck (LUX)	20
78	Edy Schütz (LUX)	DNF
79	Willy Spühler (SUI)	79
80	Karl Brand (SUI)	82

Red Devils
No.	Rider	Pos.
81	Walter Godefroot (BEL)	60
82	Paul In ’t Ven (BEL)	43
83	Willy In ’t Ven (BEL)	51
84	Michel Jacquemin (BEL)	77
85	Jean Monteyne (BEL)	53
86	Guido Reybrouck (BEL)	42
87	Roger Swerts (BEL)	54
88	Noël Van Clooster (BEL)	16
89	Bernard Van de Kerckhove (BEL)	DNF
90	Victor Van Schil (BEL)	28

Esperanza
No.	Rider	Pos.
91	Jesús Aranzabal (ESP)	50
92	Eduardo Castelló (ESP)	DNF
93	Ventura Díaz (ESP)	41
94	Sebastián Elorza (ESP)	DNF
95	José Ramón Goyeneche (ESP)	DNF
96	Ángel Ibáñez (ESP)	48
97	José Manuel Lasa (ESP)	74
98	Fernando Manzaneque (ESP)	10
99	Jorge Mariné (ESP)	56
100	Ramón Mendiburu (ESP)	DNF

Primavera
No.	Rider	Pos.
101	Franco Balmamion (ITA)	3
102	Marino Basso (ITA)	64
103	Franco Bodrero (ITA)	15
104	Claudio Michelotto (ITA)	61
105	Guido Neri (ITA)	DNF
106	Giancarlo Polidori (ITA)	22
107	Ambrogio Portalupi (ITA)	58
108	Pietro Scandelli (ITA)	44
109	Remo Stefanoni (ITA)	DNF
110	Guerrino Tosello (ITA)	DNF

Bleuets de France
No.	Rider	Pos.
111	Georges Chappe (FRA)	37
112	Fernand Etter (FRA)	DNF
113	Guy Ignolin (FRA)	DNF
114	Maurice Izier (FRA)	40
115	Désiré Letort (FRA)	4
116	Roger Milliot (FRA)	66
117	Henri Rabaute (FRA)	21
118	Christian Raymond (FRA)	57
119	José Samyn (FRA)	17
120	André Zimmermann (FRA)	DNF

Coqs de France
No.	Rider	Pos.
121	Henri Anglade (FRA)	DNF
122	André Bayssière (FRA)	19
123	Jacques Cadiou (FRA)	DNF
124	Raymond Delisle (FRA)	26
125	Jean Dumont (FRA)	38
126	Michel Grain (FRA)	39
127	Georges Groussard (FRA)	DNF
128	Jean-Claude Lebaube (FRA)	23
129	Raymond Mastrotto (FRA)	36
130	Jean-Claude Theillière (FRA)	29

=== By rider ===
Legend
No.	Starting number worn by the rider during the Tour
Pos.	Position in the general classification
DNF	Denotes a rider who did not finish

No.	Name	Nationality	Team	Pos.	Ref
1	Lucien Aimar	France	France	6	
2	Édouard Delberghe	France	France	83	
3	André Foucher	France	France	46	
4	Jean-Pierre Genet	France	France	88	
5	Paul Lemeteyer	France	France	78	
6	Anatole Novak	France	France	DNF	
7	Roger Pingeon	France	France	1	
8	Raymond Poulidor	France	France	9	
9	Raymond Riotte	France	France	72	
10	Jean Stablinski	France	France	81	
11	Winfried Bölke	West Germany	Germany	DNF	
12	Peter Glemser	West Germany	Germany	DNF	
13	Hans Junkermann	West Germany	Germany	11	
14	Karl-Heinz Kunde	West Germany	Germany	DNF	
15	Horst Oldenburg	West Germany	Germany	DNF	
16	Wilfried Peffgen	West Germany	Germany	DNF	
17	Dieter Puschel	West Germany	Germany	DNF	
18	Dieter Wiedemann	West Germany	Germany	52	
19	Herbert Wilde	West Germany	Germany	63	
20	Rolf Wolfshohl	West Germany	Germany	31	
21	Frans Brands	Belgium	Belgium	13	
22	Jos Huysmans	Belgium	Belgium	8	
23	Willy Monty	Belgium	Belgium	12	
24	Willy Planckaert	Belgium	Belgium	DNF	
25	Jozef Spruyt	Belgium	Belgium	47	
26	Georges Vandenberghe	Belgium	Belgium	45	
27	Martin Van Den Bossche	Belgium	Belgium	59	
28	Rik Van Looy	Belgium	Belgium	DNF	
29	Willy Van Neste	Belgium	Belgium	DNF	
30	Herman Van Springel	Belgium	Belgium	24	
31	Jaime Alomar Florit	Spain	Spain	DNF	
32	Mariano Díaz	Spain	Spain	DNF	
33	José María Errandonea	Spain	Spain	DNF	
34	Ginés García Perán	Spain	Spain	18	
35	Julio Jiménez	Spain	Spain	2	
36	José Manuel López	Spain	Spain	33	
37	Luis Otaño	Spain	Spain	DNF	
38	Ramón Sáez Marzo	Spain	Spain	85	
39	Luis Pedro Santamarina	Spain	Spain	49	
40	Valentín Uriona	Spain	Spain	DNF	
41	Peter Chisman	Great Britain	Great Britain	DNF	
42	Vin Denson	Great Britain	Great Britain	DNF	
43	Peter Hill	Great Britain	Great Britain	DNF	
44	Albert Hitchen	Great Britain	Great Britain	DNF	
45	Barry Hoban	Great Britain	Great Britain	62	
46	Bill Lawrie	Australia	Great Britain	DNF	
47	Colin Lewis	Great Britain	Great Britain	84	
48	Arthur Metcalfe	Great Britain	Great Britain	69	
49	Tom Simpson	Great Britain	Great Britain	DNF	
50	Michael Wright	Great Britain	Great Britain	DNF	
51	Carlo Chiappano	Italy	Italy	DNF	
52	Ugo Colombo	Italy	Italy	34	
53	Luciano Dalla Bona	Italy	Italy	65	
54	Adriano Durante	Italy	Italy	80	
55	Giancarlo Ferretti	Italy	Italy	68	
56	Felice Gimondi	Italy	Italy	7	
57	Mario Minieri	Italy	Italy	87	
58	Guido Marcello Mugnaini	Italy	Italy	DNF	
59	Roberto Poggiali	Italy	Italy	27	
60	Flaviano Vicentini	Italy	Italy	32	
61	Jo de Roo	Netherlands	Netherlands	76	
62	Cees Haast	Netherlands	Netherlands	14	
63	Huub Harings	Netherlands	Netherlands	75	
64	Jan Janssen	Netherlands	Netherlands	5	
65	Gerben Karstens	Netherlands	Netherlands	30	
66	Bas Maliepaard	Netherlands	Netherlands	DNF	
67	Henk Nijdam	Netherlands	Netherlands	DNF	
68	Wim Schepers	Netherlands	Netherlands	25	
69	Jos van der Vleuten	Netherlands	Netherlands	67	
70	Huub Zilverberg	Netherlands	Netherlands	71	
71	René Binggeli	Switzerland	Switzerland/Luxembourg	55	
72	Francis Blanc	Switzerland	Switzerland/Luxembourg	86	
73	Rodolf Hauser	Switzerland	Switzerland/Luxembourg	DNF	
74	Bernard Vifian	Switzerland	Switzerland/Luxembourg	73	
75	Louis Pfenninger	Switzerland	Switzerland/Luxembourg	70	
76	Alfred Rüegg	Switzerland	Switzerland/Luxembourg	35	
77	Johny Schleck	Luxembourg	Switzerland/Luxembourg	20	
78	Edy Schütz	Luxembourg	Switzerland/Luxembourg	DNF	
79	Willy Spühler	Switzerland	Switzerland/Luxembourg	79	
80	Karl Brand	Switzerland	Switzerland/Luxembourg	82	
81	Walter Godefroot	Belgium	Red Devils	60	
82	Paul In 't Ven	Belgium	Red Devils	43	
83	Willy In 't Ven	Belgium	Red Devils	51	
84	Michel Jacquemin	Belgium	Red Devils	77	
85	Jean Monteyne	Belgium	Red Devils	53	
86	Guido Reybrouck	Belgium	Red Devils	42	
87	Roger Swerts	Belgium	Red Devils	54	
88	Noël Van Clooster	Belgium	Red Devils	16	
89	Bernard Van de Kerckhove	Belgium	Red Devils	DNF	
90	Victor Van Schil	Belgium	Red Devils	28	
91	Jesús Aranzabal	Spain	Esperanza	50	
92	Eduardo Castelló	Spain	Esperanza	DNF	
93	Ventura Díaz	Spain	Esperanza	41	
94	Sebastián Elorza	Spain	Esperanza	DNF	
95	José Ramón Goyeneche	Spain	Esperanza	DNF	
96	Ángel Ibáñez	Spain	Esperanza	48	
97	José Manuel Lasa	Spain	Esperanza	74	
98	Fernando Manzaneque	Spain	Esperanza	10	
99	Jorge Mariné	Spain	Esperanza	56	
100	Ramón Mendiburu	Spain	Esperanza	DNF	
101	Franco Balmamion	Italy	Primavera	3	
102	Marino Basso	Italy	Primavera	64	
103	Franco Bodrero	Italy	Primavera	15	
104	Claudio Michelotto	Italy	Primavera	61	
105	Guido Neri	Italy	Primavera	DNF	
106	Giancarlo Polidori	Italy	Primavera	22	
107	Ambrogio Portalupi	Italy	Primavera	58	
108	Pietro Scandelli	Italy	Primavera	44	
109	Remo Stefanoni	Italy	Primavera	DNF	
110	Guerrino Tosello	Italy	Primavera	DNF	
111	Georges Chappe	France	Bleuets de France	37	
112	Fernand Etter	France	Bleuets de France	DNF	
113	Guy Ignolin	France	Bleuets de France	DNF	
114	Maurice Izier	France	Bleuets de France	40	
115	Désiré Letort	France	Bleuets de France	4	
116	Roger Milliot	France	Bleuets de France	66	
117	Henri Rabaute	France	Bleuets de France	21	
118	Christian Raymond	France	Bleuets de France	57	
119	José Samyn	France	Bleuets de France	17	
120	André Zimmermann	France	Bleuets de France	DNF	
121	Henri Anglade	France	Coqs de France	DNF	
122	André Bayssière	France	Coqs de France	19	
123	Jacques Cadiou	France	Coqs de France	DNF	
124	Raymond Delisle	France	Coqs de France	26	
125	Jean Dumont	France	Coqs de France	38	
126	Michel Grain	France	Coqs de France	39	
127	Georges Groussard	France	Coqs de France	DNF	
128	Jean-Claude Lebaube	France	Coqs de France	23	
129	Raymond Mastrotto	France	Coqs de France	36	
130	Jean-Claude Theillière	France	Coqs de France	29	
