= 1967 Tour de France, Stage 12 to Stage 22b =

Cycling race stages

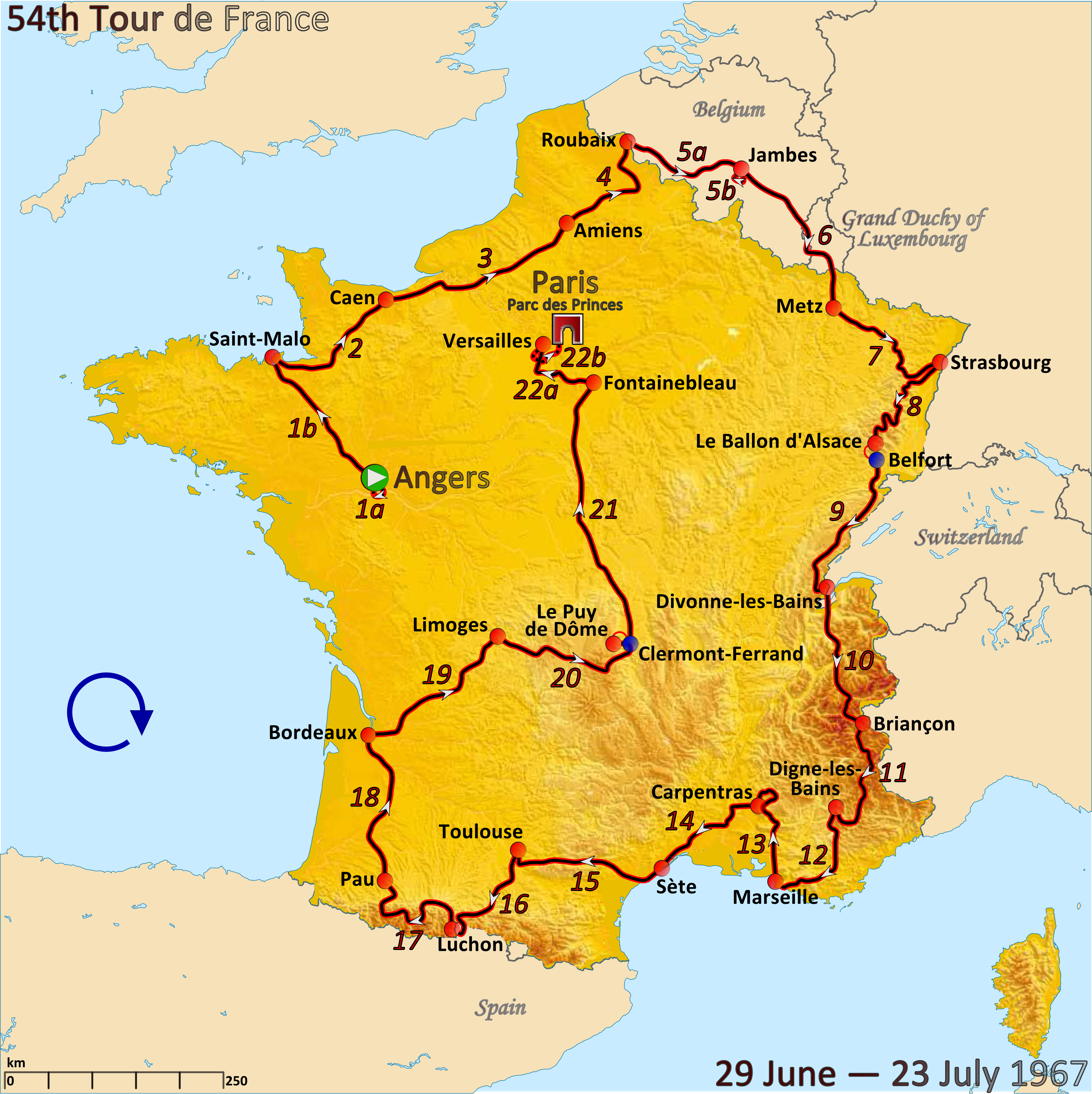
Route of the 1967 Tour de France

The 1967 Tour de France was the 54th edition of the Tour de France, one of cycling's Grand Tours. The Tour began in Angers with an individual time trial on 29 June, and Stage 12 occurred on 12 July with a flat stage from Digne. The race finished in Paris on 23 July.

== Stage 12 ==
12 July 1967 – Digne to Marseille, 207.5 km (128.9 mi)

Stage 12 result

Rank	Rider	Team	Time
1	Raymond Riotte (FRA)	France	6h 16' 08"
2	Paul Lemeteyer (FRA)	France	+ 49"
3	Johny Schleck (LUX)	Switzerland/Luxembourg	s.t.
4	Wim Schepers (NED)	Netherlands	s.t.
5	Marino Basso (ITA)	Primavera	s.t.
6	Gerben Karstens (NED)	Netherlands	+ 1' 30"
7	Tom Simpson (GBR)	Great Britain	s.t.
8	Guido Reybrouck (BEL)	Red Devils	s.t.
9	Georges Vandenberghe (BEL)	Belgium	s.t.
10	Walter Godefroot (BEL)	Red Devils	s.t.

General classification after stage 12

Rank	Rider	Team	Time
1	Roger Pingeon (FRA)	France	68h 59' 39"
2	Désiré Letort (FRA)	Bleuets de France	+ 4' 02"
3	Julio Jiménez (ESP)	Spain	+ 4' 57"
4	Franco Balmamion (ITA)	Primavera	+ 5' 48"
5	Felice Gimondi (ITA)	Italy	+ 6' 15"
6	Lucien Aimar (FRA)	France	+ 7' 02"
7	Tom Simpson (GBR)	Great Britain	+ 8' 20"
8	Jan Janssen (NED)	Netherlands	+ 8' 39"
9	Noël Van Clooster (BEL)	Red Devils	+ 9' 34"
10	Cees Haast (NED)	Netherlands	+ 9' 38"

== Stage 13 ==
13 July 1967 – Marseille to Carpentras, 211.5 km (131.4 mi)

Stage 13 result

Rank	Rider	Team	Time
1	Jan Janssen (NED)	Netherlands	6h 58' 15"
2	Felice Gimondi (ITA)	Italy	s.t.
3	Roger Pingeon (FRA)	France	s.t.
4	Franco Balmamion (ITA)	Primavera	s.t.
5	Lucien Aimar (FRA)	France	s.t.
6	Julio Jiménez (ESP)	Spain	+ 3"
7	Désiré Letort (FRA)	Bleuets de France	s.t.
8	Dieter Puschel (FRG)	Germany	+ 2' 02"
9	Eduardo Castelló (ESP)	Esperanza	+ 2' 04"
10	Raymond Poulidor (FRA)	France	s.t.

General classification after stage 13

Rank	Rider	Team	Time
1	Roger Pingeon (FRA)	France	75h 57' 54"
2	Désiré Letort (FRA)	Bleuets de France	+ 4' 05"
3	Julio Jiménez (ESP)	Spain	+ 5' 00"
4	Franco Balmamion (ITA)	Primavera	+ 5' 48"
5	Felice Gimondi (ITA)	Italy	+ 6' 15"
6	Lucien Aimar (FRA)	France	+ 7' 02"
7	Jan Janssen (NED)	Netherlands	+ 8' 39"
8	Noël Van Clooster (BEL)	Red Devils	+ 13' 20"
9	Jos Huysmans (BEL)	Belgium	+ 13' 42"
10	Dieter Puschel (FRG)	Germany	+ 14' 47"

== Stage 14 ==
14 July 1967 – Carpentras to Sète, 201.5 km (125.2 mi)

The peloton granted the stage win to Tom Simpson's teammate, Barry Hoban, after Simpson's death the day before.

Stage 14 result

Rank	Rider	Team	Time
1	Barry Hoban (GBR)	Great Britain	6h 13' 58"
2	Guido Reybrouck (BEL)	Red Devils	+ 3' 58"
3	Georges Vandenberghe (BEL)	Belgium	s.t.
4	Walter Godefroot (BEL)	Red Devils	s.t.
5	Gerben Karstens (NED)	Netherlands	s.t.
6	Michel Grain (FRA)	Coqs de France	s.t.
7	Jan Janssen (NED)	Netherlands	s.t.
8	Victor Van Schil (BEL)	Red Devils	s.t.
9	Roger Swerts (BEL)	Red Devils	s.t.
10	Paul Lemeteyer (FRA)	France	s.t.

General classification after stage 14

Rank	Rider	Team	Time
1	Roger Pingeon (FRA)	France	82h 15' 50"
2	Désiré Letort (FRA)	Bleuets de France	+ 4' 05"
3	Julio Jiménez (ESP)	Spain	+ 5' 00"
4	Franco Balmamion (ITA)	Primavera	+ 5' 48"
5	Felice Gimondi (ITA)	Italy	+ 6' 15"
6	Lucien Aimar (FRA)	France	+ 7' 02"
7	Jan Janssen (NED)	Netherlands	+ 8' 39"
8	Noël Van Clooster (BEL)	Red Devils	+ 13' 20"
9	Jos Huysmans (BEL)	Belgium	+ 13' 42"
10	Dieter Puschel (FRG)	Germany	+ 14' 47"

== Rest day 2 ==
15 July 1967 – Sète

== Stage 15 ==
16 July 1967 – Sète to Toulouse, 230.5 km (143.2 mi)

Stage 15 result

Rank	Rider	Team	Time
1	Rolf Wolfshohl (FRG)	Germany	6h 28' 23"
2	Huub Zilverberg (NED)	Netherlands	s.t.
3	Paul Lemeteyer (FRA)	France	+ 2' 14"
4	Georges Vandenberghe (BEL)	Belgium	s.t.
5	Michel Grain (FRA)	Coqs de France	s.t.
6	Jan Janssen (NED)	Netherlands	s.t.
7	Adriano Durante (ITA)	Italy	s.t.
8	Jo de Roo (NED)	Netherlands	s.t.
9	Marino Basso (ITA)	Primavera	s.t.
10	Roger Swerts (BEL)	Red Devils	s.t.

General classification after stage 15

Rank	Rider	Team	Time
1	Roger Pingeon (FRA)	France	88h 46' 27"
2	Désiré Letort (FRA)	Bleuets de France	+ 4' 05"
3	Julio Jiménez (ESP)	Spain	+ 5' 00"
4	Franco Balmamion (ITA)	Primavera	+ 5' 48"
5	Felice Gimondi (ITA)	Italy	+ 6' 15"
6	Lucien Aimar (FRA)	France	+ 7' 02"
7	Jan Janssen (NED)	Netherlands	+ 8' 39"
8	Noël Van Clooster (BEL)	Red Devils	+ 13' 20"
9	Jos Huysmans (BEL)	Belgium	+ 13' 42"
10	Dieter Puschel (FRG)	Germany	+ 14' 47"

== Stage 16 ==
17 July 1967 – Toulouse to Luchon, 188 km (117 mi)

Stage 16 result

Rank	Rider	Team	Time
1	Fernando Manzaneque (ESP)	Esperanza	5h 38' 19"
2	Julio Jiménez (ESP)	Spain	+ 1' 23"
3	Jan Janssen (NED)	Netherlands	+ 4' 20"
4	Lucien Aimar (FRA)	France	s.t.
5	Franco Balmamion (ITA)	Primavera	s.t.
6	Roger Pingeon (FRA)	France	s.t.
7	Désiré Letort (FRA)	Bleuets de France	s.t.
8	Raymond Poulidor (FRA)	France	+ 4' 45"
9	Noël Van Clooster (BEL)	Red Devils	+ 5' 42"
10	Henri Rabaute (FRA)	Bleuets de France	+ 6' 44"

General classification after stage 16

Rank	Rider	Team	Time
1	Roger Pingeon (FRA)	France	94h 29' 06"
2	Julio Jiménez (ESP)	Spain	+ 2' 03"
3	Désiré Letort (FRA)	Bleuets de France	+ 4' 05"
4	Franco Balmamion (ITA)	Primavera	+ 5' 48"
5	Lucien Aimar (FRA)	France	+ 7' 02"
6	Jan Janssen (NED)	Netherlands	+ 8' 39"
7	Noël Van Clooster (BEL)	Red Devils	+ 14' 42"
8	Fernando Manzaneque (ESP)	Esperanza	+ 15' 45"
9	Felice Gimondi (ITA)	Italy	+ 15' 50"
10	Franco Bodrero (ITA)	Primavera	+ 19' 03"

== Stage 17 ==
18 July 1967 – Luchon to Pau, 250 km (160 mi)

Stage 17 result

Rank	Rider	Team	Time
1	Raymond Mastrotto (FRA)	Coqs de France	8h 00' 27"
2	Herman Van Springel (BEL)	Belgium	+ 49"
3	Hans Junkermann (FRG)	Germany	+ 49"
4	Jan Janssen (NED)	Netherlands	+ 1' 55"
5	Gerben Karstens (NED)	Netherlands	s.t.
6	Michel Grain (FRA)	Coqs de France	s.t.
7	Georges Vandenberghe (BEL)	Belgium	s.t.
8	Johny Schleck (LUX)	Switzerland/Luxembourg	s.t.
9	José Samyn (FRA)	Bleuets de France	s.t.
10	Flaviano Vicentini (ITA)	Italy	s.t.

General classification after stage 17

Rank	Rider	Team	Time
1	Roger Pingeon (FRA)	France	102h 31' 28"
2	Julio Jiménez (ESP)	Spain	+ 2' 03"
3	Désiré Letort (FRA)	Bleuets de France	+ 4' 05"
4	Franco Balmamion (ITA)	Primavera	+ 5' 48"
5	Lucien Aimar (FRA)	France	+ 7' 02"
6	Jan Janssen (NED)	Netherlands	+ 8' 39"
7	Fernando Manzaneque (ESP)	Esperanza	+ 15' 45"
8	Felice Gimondi (ITA)	Italy	+ 15' 50"
9	Franco Bodrero (ITA)	Primavera	+ 19' 03"
10	Raymond Poulidor (FRA)	France	+ 19' 04"

== Stage 18 ==
19 July 1967 – Pau to Bordeaux, 206.5 km (128.3 mi)

Stage 18 result

Rank	Rider	Team	Time
1	Marino Basso (ITA)	Primavera	5h 52' 45"
2	Georges Vandenberghe (BEL)	Belgium	s.t.
3	Adriano Durante (ITA)	Italy	s.t.
4	José Samyn (FRA)	Bleuets de France	s.t.
5	André Foucher (FRA)	France	s.t.
6	Jos van der Vleuten (NED)	Netherlands	s.t.
7	Hans Junkermann (FRG)	Germany	s.t.
8	Fernando Manzaneque (ESP)	Esperanza	s.t.
9	Luciano Dalla Bona (ITA)	Italy	s.t.
10	Maurice Izier (FRA)	Bleuets de France	s.t.

General classification after stage 18

Rank	Rider	Team	Time
1	Roger Pingeon (FRA)	France	108h 27' 37"
2	Julio Jiménez (ESP)	Spain	+ 2' 03"
3	Désiré Letort (FRA)	Bleuets de France	+ 4' 05"
4	Franco Balmamion (ITA)	Primavera	+ 5' 48"
5	Lucien Aimar (FRA)	France	+ 7' 02"
6	Jan Janssen (NED)	Netherlands	+ 8' 39"
7	Fernando Manzaneque (ESP)	Esperanza	+ 12' 21"
8	Jos Huysmans (BEL)	Belgium	+ 15' 44"
9	Felice Gimondi (ITA)	Italy	+ 15' 50"
10	Franco Bodrero (ITA)	Primavera	+ 19' 03"

== Stage 19 ==
20 July 1967 – Bordeaux to Limoges, 217 km (135 mi)

Stage 19 result

Rank	Rider	Team	Time
1	Jean Stablinski (FRA)	France	5h 50' 20"
2	Michel Grain (FRA)	Coqs de France	+ 1' 46"
3	René Binggeli (SUI)	Switzerland/Luxembourg	s.t.
4	Jos van der Vleuten (NED)	Netherlands	s.t.
5	Wim Schepers (NED)	Netherlands	+ 4' 08"
6	Jos Huysmans (BEL)	Belgium	+ 4' 09"
7	Johny Schleck (LUX)	Switzerland/Luxembourg	+ 5' 50"
8	Herbert Wilde (FRG)	Germany	s.t.
9	Giancarlo Polidori (ITA)	Primavera	s.t.
10	Jan Janssen (NED)	Netherlands	+ 5' 56"

General classification after stage 19

Rank	Rider	Team	Time
1	Roger Pingeon (FRA)	France	114h 23' 53"
2	Julio Jiménez (ESP)	Spain	+ 2' 03"
3	Désiré Letort (FRA)	Bleuets de France	+ 4' 05"
4	Franco Balmamion (ITA)	Primavera	+ 5' 48"
5	Lucien Aimar (FRA)	France	+ 7' 02"
6	Jan Janssen (NED)	Netherlands	+ 8' 39"
7	Fernando Manzaneque (ESP)	Esperanza	+ 12' 21"
8	Jos Huysmans (BEL)	Belgium	+ 13' 57"
9	Felice Gimondi (ITA)	Italy	+ 15' 50"
10	Franco Bodrero (ITA)	Primavera	+ 19' 03"

== Stage 20 ==
21 July 1967 – Limoges to Puy de Dôme, 222 km (138 mi)

Stage 20 result

Rank	Rider	Team	Time
1	Felice Gimondi (ITA)	Italy	7h 08' 21"
2	Henri Rabaute (FRA)	Bleuets de France	+ 4' 50"
3	Julio Jiménez (ESP)	Spain	+ 4' 52"
4	Raymond Poulidor (FRA)	France	+ 5' 15"
5	Roger Pingeon (FRA)	France	+ 5' 16"
6	Jan Janssen (NED)	Netherlands	+ 5' 39"
7	Franco Balmamion (ITA)	Primavera	+ 6' 00"
8	Ventura Díaz (ESP)	Esperanza	+ 6' 09"
9	Ginés García Perán (ESP)	Spain	+ 6' 12"
10	Herman Van Springel (BEL)	Belgium	+ 6' 27"

General classification after stage 20

Rank	Rider	Team	Time
1	Roger Pingeon (FRA)	France	121h 37' 30"
2	Julio Jiménez (ESP)	Spain	+ 1' 39"
3	Désiré Letort (FRA)	Bleuets de France	+ 5' 53"
4	Franco Balmamion (ITA)	Primavera	+ 6' 32"
5	Lucien Aimar (FRA)	France	+ 8' 28"
6	Jan Janssen (NED)	Netherlands	+ 9' 02"
7	Felice Gimondi (ITA)	Italy	+ 10' 34"
8	Jos Huysmans (BEL)	Belgium	+ 15' 08"
9	Fernando Manzaneque (ESP)	Esperanza	+ 16' 11"
10	Raymond Poulidor (FRA)	France	+ 19' 03"

== Stage 21 ==
22 July 1967 – Clermont-Ferrand to Fontainebleau, 359 km (223 mi)

Stage 21 result

Rank	Rider	Team	Time
1	Paul Lemeteyer (FRA)	France	11h 12' 47"
2	Roger Swerts (BEL)	Red Devils	s.t.
3	Marino Basso (ITA)	Primavera	s.t.
4	Johny Schleck (LUX)	Switzerland/Luxembourg	s.t.
5	Cees Haast (NED)	Netherlands	s.t.
6	Wim Schepers (NED)	Netherlands	s.t.
7	Frans Brands (BEL)	Belgium	s.t.
8	Hans Junkermann (FRG)	Germany	s.t.
9	Raymond Riotte (FRA)	France	s.t.
10	Pietro Scandelli (ITA)	Primavera	s.t.

General classification after stage 21

Rank	Rider	Team	Time
1	Roger Pingeon (FRA)	France	132h 56' 59"
2	Julio Jiménez (ESP)	Spain	+ 1' 39"
3	Désiré Letort (FRA)	Bleuets de France	+ 5' 53"
4	Franco Balmamion (ITA)	Primavera	+ 6' 32"
5	Lucien Aimar (FRA)	France	+ 8' 28"
6	Jan Janssen (NED)	Netherlands	+ 9' 02"
7	Felice Gimondi (ITA)	Italy	+ 10' 34"
8	Jos Huysmans (BEL)	Belgium	+ 15' 08"
9	Fernando Manzaneque (ESP)	Esperanza	+ 16' 11"
10	Raymond Poulidor (FRA)	France	+ 19' 03"

== Stage 22a ==
23 July 1967 – Fontainebleau to Versailles, 104 km (65 mi)

Stage 22a result

Rank	Rider	Team	Time
1	René Binggeli (SUI)	Switzerland/Luxembourg	2h 45' 44"
2	Herbert Wilde (FRG)	Germany	s.t.
3	Michel Jacquemin (BEL)	Red Devils	s.t.
4	Barry Hoban (GBR)	Great Britain	+ 5' 52"
5	Jean Monteyne (BEL)	Red Devils	s.t.
6	Wim Schepers (NED)	Netherlands	s.t.
7	Paul In ’t Ven (BEL)	Red Devils	+ 5' 55"
8	Gerben Karstens (NED)	Netherlands	+ 6' 34"
9	Guido Reybrouck (BEL)	Red Devils	s.t.
10	Johny Schleck (LUX)	Switzerland/Luxembourg	s.t.

General classification after stage 22a

Rank	Rider	Team	Time
1	Roger Pingeon (FRA)	France	135h 50' 13"
2	Julio Jiménez (ESP)	Spain	+ 1' 39"
3	Désiré Letort (FRA)	Bleuets de France	+ 5' 53"
4	Franco Balmamion (ITA)	Primavera	+ 6' 32"
5	Lucien Aimar (FRA)	France	+ 8' 28"
6	Jan Janssen (NED)	Netherlands	+ 9' 02"
7	Felice Gimondi (ITA)	Italy	+ 10' 34"
8	Jos Huysmans (BEL)	Belgium	+ 15' 08"
9	Fernando Manzaneque (ESP)	Esperanza	+ 16' 11"
10	Raymond Poulidor (FRA)	France	+ 19' 03"

== Stage 22b ==
23 July 1967 – Versailles to Paris, 46.6 km (29.0 mi) (ITT)

Stage 22b result

Rank	Rider	Team	Time
1	Raymond Poulidor (FRA)	France	1h 02' 52"
2	Felice Gimondi (ITA)	Italy	+ 25"
3	Roger Pingeon (FRA)	France	+ 45"
4	Jan Janssen (NED)	Netherlands	+ 1' 30"
5	Franco Balmamion (ITA)	Primavera	+ 1' 36"
6	Lucien Aimar (FRA)	France	+ 2' 04"
7	Ginés García Perán (ESP)	Spain	+ 2' 07"
8	Jean-Claude Lebaube (FRA)	Coqs de France	+ 2' 18"
9	Jos van der Vleuten (NED)	Netherlands	+ 2' 19"
10	Jos Huysmans (BEL)	Belgium	+ 2' 22"

General classification after stage 22b

Rank	Rider	Team	Time
1	Roger Pingeon (FRA)	France	136h 53' 50"
2	Julio Jiménez (ESP)	Spain	+ 3' 40"
3	Franco Balmamion (ITA)	Primavera	+ 7' 23"
4	Désiré Letort (FRA)	Bleuets de France	+ 8' 18"
5	Jan Janssen (NED)	Netherlands	+ 9' 47"
6	Lucien Aimar (FRA)	France	s.t.
7	Felice Gimondi (ITA)	Italy	+ 10' 14"
8	Jos Huysmans (BEL)	Belgium	+ 16' 45"
9	Raymond Poulidor (FRA)	France	+ 18' 18"
10	Fernando Manzaneque (ESP)	Esperanza	+ 19' 22"
