= 1967 Tour de France, Stage 1a to Stage 11 =

Cycling race stages

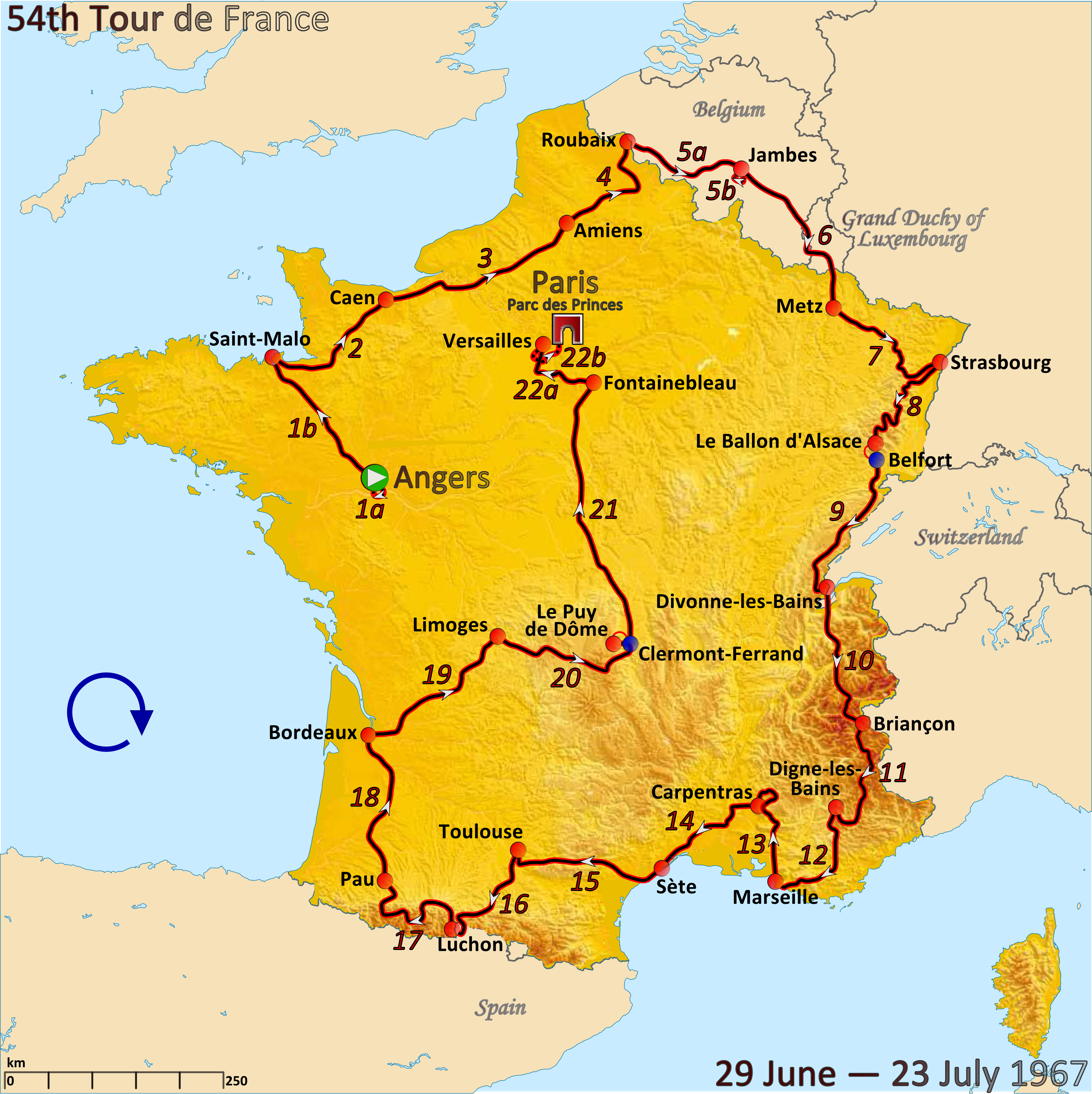
Route of the 1967 Tour de France

The 1967 Tour de France was the 54th edition of the Tour de France, one of cycling's Grand Tours. The Tour began in Angers with an individual time trial on 29 June, and Stage 11 occurred on 11 July with a mountainous stage to Digne. The race finished in Paris on 23 July.

== Stage 1a ==
29 June 1967 – Angers to Angers, 5.775 km (3.588 mi) (ITT)

Stage 1a result and general classification after stage 1a

| Rank | Rider | Team | Time |
|---|---|---|---|
| 1 | José María Errandonea (ESP) | Spain | 7' 43" |
| 2 | Raymond Poulidor (FRA) | France | + 6" |
| 3 | Jan Janssen (NED) | Netherlands | + 10" |
| 4 | Luis Otaño (ESP) | Spain | + 13" |
| 5 | José Manuel López (ESP) | Spain | + 14" |
| 6 | Felice Gimondi (ITA) | Italy | s.t. |
| 7 | Gerben Karstens (NED) | Netherlands | + 15" |
| 8 | Franco Balmamion (ITA) | Primavera | + 17" |
| 9 | Roger Milliot (FRA) | Bleuets de France | s.t. |
| 10 | Ramón Sáez Marzo (ESP) | Spain | + 18" |

== Stage 1b ==
30 June 1967 – Angers to Saint-Malo, 185 km (115 mi)

Stage 1b result

| Rank | Rider | Team | Time |
|---|---|---|---|
| 1 | Walter Godefroot (BEL) | Red Devils | 4h 34' 49" |
| 2 | Gerben Karstens (NED) | Netherlands | + 2" |
| 3 | Paul Lemeteyer (FRA) | France | s.t. |
| 4 | Ramón Sáez Marzo (ESP) | Spain | s.t. |
| 5 | Horst Oldenburg (FRG) | Germany | s.t. |
| 6 | Guido Reybrouck (BEL) | Red Devils | s.t. |
| 7 | Adriano Durante (ITA) | Italy | s.t. |
| 8 | Willy Planckaert (BEL) | Belgium | s.t. |
| 9 | Henk Nijdam (NED) | Netherlands | s.t. |
| 10 | Jan Janssen (NED) | Netherlands | s.t. |

General classification after stage 1b

| Rank | Rider | Team | Time |
|---|---|---|---|
| 1 | José María Errandonea (ESP) | Spain | 4h 42' 34" |
| 2 | Gerben Karstens (NED) | Netherlands | + 5" |
| 3 | Raymond Poulidor (FRA) | France | + 6" |
| 4 | Jan Janssen (NED) | Netherlands | + 10" |
| 5 | Walter Godefroot (BEL) | Red Devils | + 11" |
| 6 | Luis Otaño (ESP) | Spain | + 13" |
| 7 | José Manuel López (ESP) | Spain | + 14" |
| 8 | Felice Gimondi (ITA) | Italy | s.t. |
| 9 | Roger Milliot (FRA) | Bleuets de France | + 17" |
| 10 | Franco Balmamion (ITA) | Primavera | s.t. |

== Stage 2 ==
1 July 1967 – Saint-Malo to Caen, 180 km (110 mi)

Stage 2 result

| Rank | Rider | Team | Time |
|---|---|---|---|
| 1 | Willy Van Neste (BEL) | Belgium | 4h 18' 33" |
| 2 | Jesús Aranzabal (ESP) | Esperanza | + 1" |
| 3 | Michel Grain (FRA) | Coqs de France | + 2" |
| 4 | Christian Raymond (FRA) | Bleuets de France | s.t. |
| 5 | Jaime Alomar Florit (ESP) | Spain | s.t. |
| 6 | Roger Swerts (BEL) | Red Devils | s.t. |
| 7 | Giancarlo Polidori (ITA) | Primavera | s.t. |
| 8 | André Zimmermann (FRA) | Bleuets de France | s.t. |
| 9 | Franco Bodrero (ITA) | Primavera | s.t. |
| 10 | Anatole Novak (FRA) | France | s.t. |

General classification after stage 2

| Rank | Rider | Team | Time |
|---|---|---|---|
| 1 | Willy Van Neste (BEL) | Belgium | 9h 01' 14" |
| 2 | Jaime Alomar Florit (ESP) | Spain | + 15" |
| 3 | Giancarlo Polidori (ITA) | Primavera | + 16" |
| 4 | Jean-Claude Lebaube (FRA) | Coqs de France | + 18" |
| 5 | Michel Grain (FRA) | Coqs de France | + 19" |
| 6 | Anatole Novak (FRA) | France | + 21" |
| 7 | Christian Raymond (FRA) | Bleuets de France | + 23" |
| 8 | Georges Chappe (FRA) | Bleuets de France | + 24" |
| 9 | Jesús Aranzabal (ESP) | Esperanza | s.t. |
| 10 | Franco Bodrero (ITA) | Primavera | + 26" |

== Stage 3 ==
2 July 1967 – Caen to Amiens, 248 km (154 mi)

Stage 3 result

| Rank | Rider | Team | Time |
|---|---|---|---|
| 1 | Marino Basso (ITA) | Primavera | 6h 01' 37" |
| 2 | Raymond Riotte (FRA) | France | s.t. |
| 3 | Jozef Spruyt (BEL) | Belgium | s.t. |
| 4 | Cees Haast (NED) | Netherlands | s.t. |
| 5 | Peter Hill (GBR) | Great Britain | s.t. |
| 6 | Ventura Díaz (ESP) | Esperanza | s.t. |
| 7 | Jean-Pierre Genet (FRA) | France | s.t. |
| 8 | Jean Dumont (FRA) | Coqs de France | s.t. |
| 9 | André Bayssière (FRA) | Coqs de France | s.t. |
| 10 | Giancarlo Polidori (ITA) | Primavera | s.t. |

General classification after stage 3

| Rank | Rider | Team | Time |
|---|---|---|---|
| 1 | Giancarlo Polidori (ITA) | Primavera | 15h 08' 07" |
| 2 | Jean-Pierre Genet (FRA) | France | + 23" |
| 3 | Raymond Riotte (FRA) | France | + 33" |
| 4 | Marino Basso (ITA) | Primavera | + 44" |
| 5 | Jean Dumont (FRA) | Coqs de France | + 49" |
| 6 | Jozef Spruyt (BEL) | Belgium | s.t. |
| 7 | Ventura Díaz (ESP) | Esperanza | + 50" |
| 8 | Cees Haast (NED) | Netherlands | + 1' 02" |
| 9 | Peter Hill (GBR) | Great Britain | + 1' 04" |
| 10 | André Bayssière (FRA) | Coqs de France | + 1' 05" |

== Stage 4 ==
3 July 1967 – Amiens to Roubaix, 191 km (119 mi)

Stage 4 result

| Rank | Rider | Team | Time |
|---|---|---|---|
| 1 | Guido Reybrouck (BEL) | Red Devils | 4h 46' 44" |
| 2 | Jan Janssen (NED) | Netherlands | s.t. |
| 3 | Gerben Karstens (NED) | Netherlands | s.t. |
| 4 | Felice Gimondi (ITA) | Italy | s.t. |
| 5 | José Manuel López (ESP) | Spain | s.t. |
| 6 | José Manuel Lasa (ESP) | Esperanza | s.t. |
| 7 | Tom Simpson (GBR) | Great Britain | s.t. |
| 8 | Raymond Poulidor (FRA) | France | s.t. |
| 9 | Désiré Letort (FRA) | Bleuets de France | s.t. |
| 10 | Jozef Spruyt (BEL) | Belgium | s.t. |

General classification after stage 4

| Rank | Rider | Team | Time |
|---|---|---|---|
| 1 | Jozef Spruyt (BEL) | Belgium | 19h 50' 40" |
| 2 | Marino Basso (ITA) | Primavera | + 19" |
| 3 | Giancarlo Polidori (ITA) | Primavera | + 1' 05" |
| 4 | Cees Haast (NED) | Netherlands | + 1' 27" |
| 5 | Jean-Pierre Genet (FRA) | France | + 1' 28" |
| 6 | André Bayssière (FRA) | Coqs de France | + 1' 30" |
| 7 | Jean Dumont (FRA) | Coqs de France | + 1' 33" |
| 8 | Raymond Riotte (FRA) | France | + 1' 38" |
| 9 | Gerben Karstens (NED) | Netherlands | + 1' 44" |
| 10 | Jan Janssen (NED) | Netherlands | s.t. |

== Stage 5a ==
4 July 1967 – Roubaix to Jambes, 172 km (107 mi)

Stage 5a result

| Rank | Rider | Team | Time |
|---|---|---|---|
| 1 | Roger Pingeon (FRA) | France | 3h 59' 16" |
| 2 | Raymond Riotte (FRA) | France | + 1' 24" |
| 3 | Jos van der Vleuten (NED) | Netherlands | s.t. |
| 4 | Johny Schleck (LUX) | Switzerland/Luxembourg | + 1' 25" |
| 5 | Giancarlo Polidori (ITA) | Primavera | + 1' 27" |
| 6 | Rik Van Looy (BEL) | Belgium | + 2' 27" |
| 7 | Guerrino Tosello (ITA) | Primavera | s.t. |
| 8 | Wilfried Peffgen (FRG) | Germany | s.t. |
| 9 | Bernard Van de Kerckhove (BEL) | Red Devils | s.t. |
| 10 | Guy Ignolin (FRA) | Bleuets de France | s.t. |

General classification after stage 5a

| Rank | Rider | Team | Time |
|---|---|---|---|
| 1 | Roger Pingeon (FRA) | France | 23h 52' 02" |
| 2 | Giancarlo Polidori (ITA) | Primavera | + 26" |
| 3 | Raymond Riotte (FRA) | France | + 46" |
| 4 | Désiré Letort (FRA) | Bleuets de France | + 2' 25" |
| 5 | Wilfried Peffgen (FRG) | Germany | + 3' 06" |
| 6 | Rik Van Looy (BEL) | Belgium | + 3' 18" |
| 7 | Jos van der Vleuten (NED) | Netherlands | + 3' 19" |
| 8 | Fernando Manzaneque (ESP) | Esperanza | + 3' 57" |
| 9 | Ginés García Perán (ESP) | Spain | + 4' 06" |
| 10 | Jozef Spruyt (BEL) | Belgium | + 4' 16" |

== Stage 5b ==
4 July 1967 – Jambes to Jambes, 17 km (11 mi) (TTT)

Stage 5b result

| Rank | Team | Time |
|---|---|---|
| 1 | Belgium | 1h 48' 32" |
| 2 | France | + 13" |
| 3 | Netherlands | + 18" |
| 4 | Primavera | + 53" |
| 5 | Red Devils | + 1' 08" |
| 6 | Spain | + 1' 18" |
| 7 | Italy | + 1' 38" |
| 8 | Germany | + 3' 08" |
| 9 | Esperanza | + 3' 23" |
| 10 | Bleuets de France | + 3' 38" |

General classification after stage 5b

| Rank | Rider | Team | Time |
|---|---|---|---|
| 1 | Roger Pingeon (FRA) | France | 23h 51' 52" (Note: The time bonuses to the G.C after Stage 5b: 20" for the members of the best team finishing in the same time as the first cyclist, 10" for the members of the second ranked team finishing in the same time as the first of this team.) |
| 2 | Giancarlo Polidori (ITA) | Primavera | + 36" |
| 3 | Raymond Riotte (FRA) | France | + 46" |
| 4 | Désiré Letort (FRA) | Bleuets de France | + 2' 35" |
| 5 | Rik Van Looy (BEL) | Belgium | + 3' 08" |
| 6 | Wilfried Peffgen (FRG) | Germany | + 3' 16" |
| 7 | Jos van der Vleuten (NED) | Netherlands | + 3' 29" |
| 8 | Jozef Spruyt (BEL) | Belgium | + 4' 06" |
| 9 | Fernando Manzaneque (ESP) | Esperanza | + 4' 07" |
| 10 | Ginés García Perán (ESP) | Spain | + 4' 16" |

== Stage 6 ==
5 July 1967 – Jambes to Metz, 238 km (148 mi)

Stage 6 result

| Rank | Rider | Team | Time |
|---|---|---|---|
| 1 | Herman Van Springel (BEL) | Belgium | 6h 13' 28" |
| 2 | Winfried Bölke (FRG) | Germany | + 1" |
| 3 | Georges Vandenberghe (BEL) | Belgium | + 46" |
| 4 | Alfred Rüegg (SUI) | Switzerland/Luxembourg | s.t. |
| 5 | Jesús Aranzabal (ESP) | Esperanza | s.t. |
| 6 | Guido Reybrouck (BEL) | Red Devils | + 57" |
| 7 | Willy Planckaert (BEL) | Belgium | s.t. |
| 8 | Gerben Karstens (NED) | Netherlands | s.t. |
| 9 | Walter Godefroot (BEL) | Red Devils | s.t. |
| 10 | Michel Grain (FRA) | Coqs de France | s.t. |

General classification after stage 6

| Rank | Rider | Team | Time |
|---|---|---|---|
| 1 | Roger Pingeon (FRA) | France | 30h 06' 17" |
| 2 | Giancarlo Polidori (ITA) | Primavera | + 36" |
| 3 | Raymond Riotte (FRA) | France | + 46" |
| 4 | Désiré Letort (FRA) | Bleuets de France | + 2' 35" |
| 5 | Rik Van Looy (BEL) | Belgium | + 3' 08" |
| 6 | Guy Ignolin (FRA) | Bleuets de France | + 3' 11" |
| 7 | Wilfried Peffgen (FRG) | Germany | + 3' 16" |
| 8 | Jos van der Vleuten (NED) | Netherlands | + 3' 29" |
| 9 | Jozef Spruyt (BEL) | Belgium | + 4' 06" |
| 10 | Fernando Manzaneque (ESP) | Esperanza | + 4' 07" |

== Stage 7 ==
6 July 1967 – Metz to Strasbourg, 205.5 km (127.7 mi)

Stage 7 result

| Rank | Rider | Team | Time |
|---|---|---|---|
| 1 | Michael Wright (GBR) | Great Britain | 5h 46' 23" |
| 2 | Georges Vandenberghe (BEL) | Belgium | s.t. |
| 3 | Raymond Riotte (FRA) | France | s.t. |
| 4 | José Manuel López (ESP) | Spain | s.t. |
| 5 | Jos van der Vleuten (NED) | Netherlands | s.t. |
| 6 | Michel Jacquemin (BEL) | Red Devils | s.t. |
| 7 | Willy Van Neste (BEL) | Belgium | s.t. |
| 8 | Guido Reybrouck (BEL) | Red Devils | + 1' 19" |
| 9 | Michel Grain (FRA) | Coqs de France | s.t. |
| 10 | Adriano Durante (ITA) | Italy | s.t. |

General classification after stage 7

| Rank | Rider | Team | Time |
|---|---|---|---|
| 1 | Raymond Riotte (FRA) | France | 35h 53' 21" |
| 2 | Roger Pingeon (FRA) | France | + 38" |
| 3 | Giancarlo Polidori (ITA) | Primavera | + 1' 14" |
| 4 | Jos van der Vleuten (NED) | Netherlands | + 2' 48" |
| 5 | Désiré Letort (FRA) | Bleuets de France | + 3' 13" |
| 6 | Guy Ignolin (FRA) | Bleuets de France | + 3' 49" |
| 7 | Wilfried Peffgen (FRG) | Germany | + 3' 54" |
| 8 | Jozef Spruyt (BEL) | Belgium | + 4' 44" |
| 9 | Fernando Manzaneque (ESP) | Esperanza | + 4' 45" |
| 10 | Ginés García Perán (ESP) | Spain | + 4' 54" |

== Stage 8 ==
6 July 1967 – Strasbourg to Belfort/Ballon d'Alsace, 215 km (134 mi)

Stage 8 result

| Rank | Rider | Team | Time |
|---|---|---|---|
| 1 | Lucien Aimar (FRA) | France | 6h 43' 43" |
| 2 | Franco Balmamion (ITA) | Primavera | + 8" |
| 3 | Noël Van Clooster (BEL) | Red Devils | + 14" |
| 4 | Jan Janssen (NED) | Netherlands | + 19" |
| 5 | Tom Simpson (GBR) | Great Britain | s.t. |
| 6 | Frans Brands (BEL) | Belgium | + 40" |
| 7 | Herman Van Springel (BEL) | Belgium | + 1' 07" |
| 8 | Willy Van Neste (BEL) | Belgium | + 1' 09" |
| 9 | Walter Godefroot (BEL) | Red Devils | + 1' 15" |
| 10 | Rolf Wolfshohl (FRG) | Germany | + 1' 29" |

General classification after stage 8

| Rank | Rider | Team | Time |
|---|---|---|---|
| 1 | Roger Pingeon (FRA) | France | 42h 39' 15" |
| 2 | Giancarlo Polidori (ITA) | Primavera | + 1' 44" |
| 3 | Désiré Letort (FRA) | Bleuets de France | + 2' 43" |
| 4 | Willy Van Neste (BEL) | Belgium | + 4' 43" |
| 5 | Herman Van Springel (BEL) | Belgium | + 4' 51" |
| 6 | Jan Janssen (NED) | Netherlands | + 5' 12" |
| 7 | Tom Simpson (GBR) | Great Britain | + 5' 15" |
| 8 | Lucien Aimar (FRA) | France | + 5' 21" |
| 9 | Johny Schleck (LUX) | Switzerland/Luxembourg | + 5' 26" |
| 10 | Franco Balmamion (ITA) | Primavera | s.t. |

== Rest day 1 ==
8 July 1967 – Belfort

== Stage 9 ==
9 July 1967 – Belfort to Divonne-les-Bains, 238.5 km (148.2 mi)

Stage 9 result

| Rank | Rider | Team | Time |
|---|---|---|---|
| 1 | Guido Reybrouck (BEL) | Red Devils | 6h 26' 22" |
| 2 | José Manuel López (ESP) | Spain | s.t. |
| 3 | Jos Huysmans (BEL) | Belgium | s.t. |
| 4 | Tom Simpson (GBR) | Great Britain | s.t. |
| 5 | Frans Brands (BEL) | Belgium | s.t. |
| 6 | Johny Schleck (LUX) | Switzerland/Luxembourg | s.t. |
| 7 | Ginés García Perán (ESP) | Spain | s.t. |
| 8 | Willy Van Neste (BEL) | Belgium | s.t. |
| 9 | Roger Pingeon (FRA) | France | s.t. |
| 10 | Guido Marcello Mugnaini (ITA) | Italy | s.t. |

General classification after stage 9

| Rank | Rider | Team | Time |
|---|---|---|---|
| 1 | Roger Pingeon (FRA) | France | 49h 05' 37" |
| 2 | Giancarlo Polidori (ITA) | Primavera | + 2' 06" |
| 3 | Désiré Letort (FRA) | Bleuets de France | + 2' 43" |
| 4 | Willy Van Neste (BEL) | Belgium | + 4' 43" |
| 5 | Herman Van Springel (BEL) | Belgium | + 5' 13" |
| 6 | Tom Simpson (GBR) | Great Britain | + 5' 15" |
| 7 | Johny Schleck (LUX) | Switzerland/Luxembourg | + 5' 26" |
| 8 | Jan Janssen (NED) | Netherlands | + 5' 34" |
| 9 | Lucien Aimar (FRA) | France | + 5' 43" |
| 10 | Franco Balmamion (ITA) | Primavera | + 5' 48" |

== Stage 10 ==
10 July 1967 – Divonne les Bains to Briançon, 243 km (151 mi)

Stage 10 result

| Rank | Rider | Team | Time |
|---|---|---|---|
| 1 | Felice Gimondi (ITA) | Italy | 7h 26' 52" |
| 2 | Julio Jiménez (ESP) | Spain | + 2" |
| 3 | Raymond Poulidor (FRA) | France | + 2' 52" |
| 4 | André Bayssière (FRA) | Coqs de France | s.t. |
| 5 | Roger Pingeon (FRA) | France | + 2' 54" |
| 6 | Franco Balmamion (ITA) | Primavera | s.t. |
| 7 | Jos Huysmans (BEL) | Belgium | + 4' 13" |
| 8 | Lucien Aimar (FRA) | France | s.t. |
| 9 | Désiré Letort (FRA) | Bleuets de France | s.t. |
| 10 | Gerben Karstens (NED) | Netherlands | + 5' 59" |

General classification after stage 10

| Rank | Rider | Team | Time |
|---|---|---|---|
| 1 | Roger Pingeon (FRA) | France | 56h 35' 23" |
| 2 | Désiré Letort (FRA) | Bleuets de France | + 4' 02" |
| 3 | Julio Jiménez (ESP) | Spain | + 4' 57" |
| 4 | Franco Balmamion (ITA) | Primavera | + 5' 48" |
| 5 | Felice Gimondi (ITA) | Italy | + 6' 15" |
| 6 | Lucien Aimar (FRA) | France | + 7' 02" |
| 7 | Tom Simpson (GBR) | Great Britain | + 8' 20" |
| 8 | Jan Janssen (NED) | Netherlands | + 8' 39" |
| 9 | Willy Van Neste (BEL) | Belgium | + 8' 54" |
| 10 | Noël Van Clooster (BEL) | Red Devils | + 9' 34" |

== Stage 11 ==
11 July 1967 – Briançon to Digne, 197 km (122 mi)

Stage 11 result

| Rank | Rider | Team | Time |
|---|---|---|---|
| 1 | José Samyn (FRA) | Bleuets de France | 6h 05' 04" |
| 2 | André Foucher (FRA) | France | + 3" |
| 3 | Edy Schütz (LUX) | Switzerland/Luxembourg | + 4" |
| 4 | Georges Chappe (FRA) | Bleuets de France | + 6" |
| 5 | Victor Van Schil (BEL) | Red Devils | + 39" |
| 6 | Michel Grain (FRA) | Coqs de France | s.t. |
| 7 | Walter Godefroot (BEL) | Red Devils | + 1' 34" |
| 8 | Gerben Karstens (NED) | Netherlands | s.t. |
| 9 | Guido Reybrouck (BEL) | Red Devils | s.t. |
| 10 | Marino Basso (ITA) | Primavera | s.t. |

General classification after stage 11

| Rank | Rider | Team | Time |
|---|---|---|---|
| 1 | Roger Pingeon (FRA) | France | 62h 42' 01" |
| 2 | Désiré Letort (FRA) | Bleuets de France | + 4' 02" |
| 3 | Julio Jiménez (ESP) | Spain | + 4' 57" |
| 4 | Franco Balmamion (ITA) | Primavera | + 5' 48" |
| 5 | Felice Gimondi (ITA) | Italy | + 6' 15" |
| 6 | Lucien Aimar (FRA) | France | + 7' 02" |
| 7 | Tom Simpson (GBR) | Great Britain | + 8' 20" |
| 8 | Jan Janssen (NED) | Netherlands | + 8' 39" |
| 9 | Noël Van Clooster (BEL) | Red Devils | + 9' 34" |
| 10 | Cees Haast (NED) | Netherlands | + 9' 38" |
