= 1967 Tour de France =

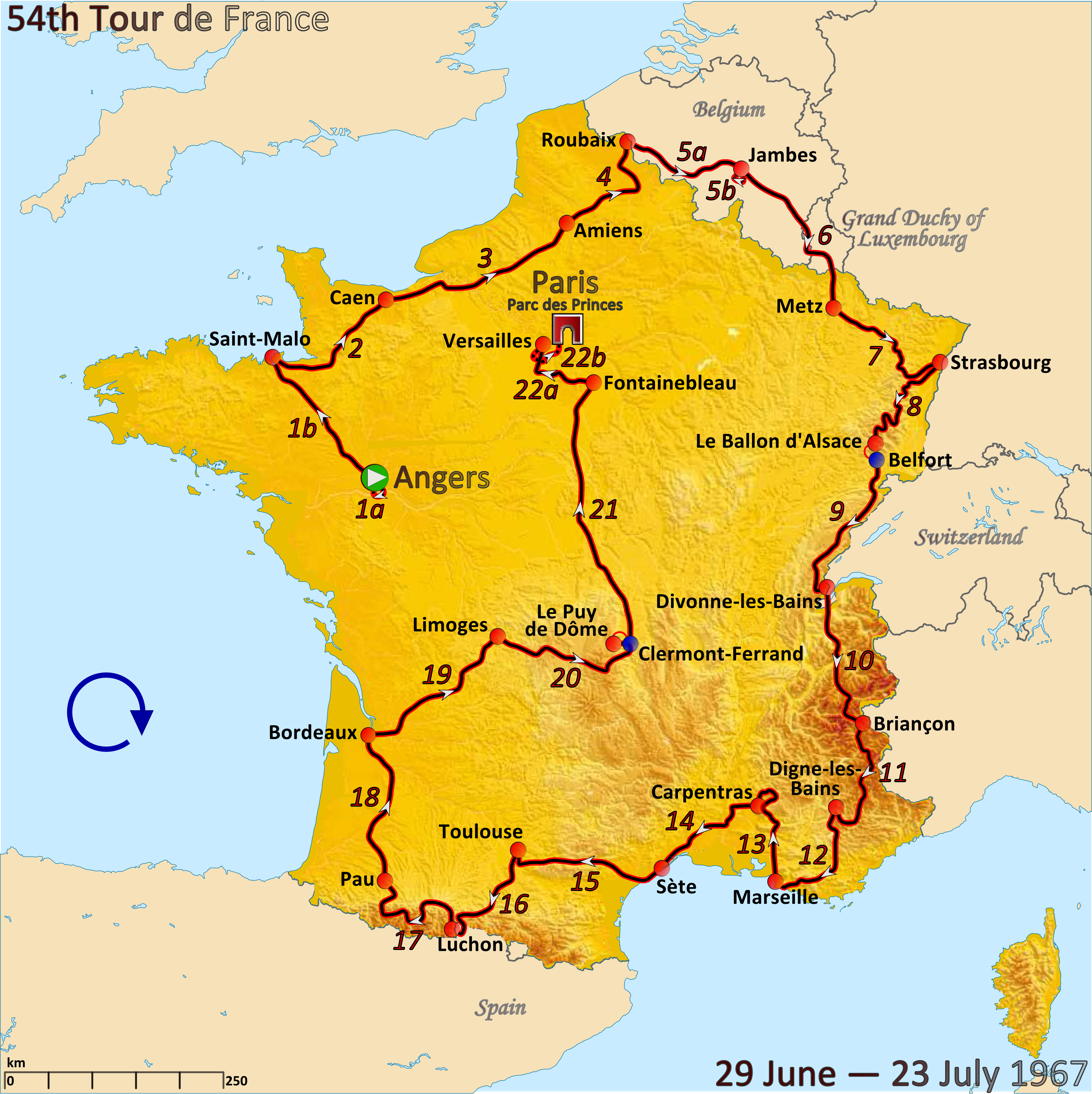
- Route of the 1967 Tour de France

Race details
- Dates: 29 June – 23 July 1967
- Stages: 22 + Prologue, including two split stages
- Distance: 4,779 km (2,970 mi)
- Winning time: 136h 53' 50"

Results
Jersey awarded to the overall winner	Winner	Roger Pingeon (FRA)	(France)
	Second	Julio Jiménez (ESP)	(Spain)
	Third	Franco Balmamion (ITA)	(Primavera)
Jersey awarded to the points classification winner	Points	Jan Janssen (NED)	(Netherlands)
	Mountains	Julio Jiménez (ESP)	(Spain)
	Sprints	Georges Vandenberghe (BEL)	(Belgium)
	Combativity	Désiré Letort (FRA)	(France)
	Team	France	

The 1967 Tour de France was the 54th edition of the Tour de France, one of cycling's Grand Tours. It took place between 29 June and 23 July, with 22 stages covering a distance of 4,779 km (2,970 mi). Thirteen national teams of ten riders competed, with three French teams, two Belgian, two Italian, two Spanish, one each from Germany, United Kingdom and the Netherlands, and a Swiss/Luxembourgian team.

The Tour was marred by the fatal collapse of Tom Simpson on the slopes of Mont Ventoux.

The Tour de France was won by Roger Pingeon, member of the French national team that also won the team classification. The points classification was won by Jan Janssen, and the mountains classification by Julio Jiménez.

== Teams ==
The previous years, the Tour had been contested by trade teams. Tour director Félix Lévitan held the team sponsors responsible for the riders' strike in the 1966 Tour de France, and therefore the formula was changed, and the national teams returned. The Tour started with 130 cyclists, divided into 13 teams of 10 cyclists.

The introduction of national teams had been seen as a gamble; the trade teams could have decided to keep their riders away from the Tour, and make the Giro d'Italia the main race. After many negotiations, this did not happen.

The teams entering the race were:

National teams

- France
- Germany
- Belgium
- Spain
- Great Britain
- Italy
- Netherlands
- Switzerland/Luxembourg

Secondary national teams

- Red Devils (Belgium)
- Esperanza (Spain)
- Primavera (Italy)
- Bleuets de France
- Coqs de France

Five-time winner Jacques Anquetil decided not to join the Tour, preferring to ride the Giro d'Italia and planning to break the hour record. Pre-race favourites for the overall victory were Felice Gimondi, Jan Janssen, Julio Jiménez and Raymond Poulidor. The French team was headed by Poulidor and defending champion Lucien Aimar, with Roger Pingeon as third option. The team director Marcel Bidot made them sign a contract, which included fines for riders that would not follow orders, and forcing riders to share their prizes.

== Route and stages ==
The route was announced in January 1967.

The race started on 29 June and was the first to have a prologue: a short individual time trial prior to stage racing, held in the evening, adding to the occasion. There were two rest days, in Belfort and Sète. Whereas in previous years the trend had been that the Tour became shorter, in 1967 it was longer, with 4779 km. The highest point of elevation in the race was 2,556 m (8,386 ft) at the summit tunnel of the Col du Galibier mountain pass on stage 10.

Stage characteristics and winners
Stage	Date	Course	Distance	Type	Winner
1a	29 June	Angers	5.775 km (3.588 mi)	Individual time trial	José-Maria Errandonea (ESP)
1b	30 June	Angers to Saint-Malo	185.5 km (115.3 mi)	Plain stage	Walter Godefroot (BEL)
2	1 July	Saint-Malo to Caen	180 km (110 mi)	Plain stage	Willy Van Neste (BEL)
3	2 July	Caen to Amiens	248 km (154 mi)	Plain stage	Marino Basso (ITA)
4	3 July	Amiens to Roubaix	191 km (119 mi)	Plain stage	Guido Reybrouck (BEL)
5a	4 July	Roubaix to Jambes (Belgium)	172 km (107 mi)	Plain stage	Roger Pingeon (FRA)
5b	4 July	Jambes (Belgium)	17 km (11 mi)	Team time trial	Belgium
6	5 July	Jambes to Metz	238 km (148 mi)	Plain stage	Herman Van Springel (BEL)
7	6 July	Metz to Strasbourg	205.5 km (127.7 mi)	Stage with mountain(s)	Michael Wright (GBR)
8	7 July	Strasbourg to Belfort/Ballon d'Alsace	215 km (134 mi)	Stage with mountain(s)	Lucien Aimar (FRA)
	8 July	Belfort		Rest day	
9	9 July	Belfort to Divonne-les-Bains	238.5 km (148.2 mi)	Stage with mountain(s)	Guido Reybrouck (BEL)
10	10 July	Divonne-les-Bains to Briançon	243 km (151 mi)	Stage with mountain(s)	Felice Gimondi (ITA)
11	11 July	Briançon to Digne	197 km (122 mi)	Stage with mountain(s)	José Samyn (FRA)
12	12 July	Digne to Marseille	207.5 km (128.9 mi)	Plain stage	Raymond Riotte (FRA)
13	13 July	Marseille to Carpentras	211.5 km (131.4 mi)	Stage with mountain(s)	Jan Janssen (NED)
14	14 July	Carpentras to Sète	201.5 km (125.2 mi)	Plain stage	Barry Hoban (GBR)
	15 July	Sète		Rest day	
15	16 July	Sète to Toulouse	230.5 km (143.2 mi)	Plain stage	Rolf Wolfshohl (FRG)
16	17 July	Toulouse to Luchon	188 km (117 mi)	Stage with mountain(s)	Fernando Manzaneque (ESP)
17	18 July	Luchon to Pau	250 km (160 mi)	Stage with mountain(s)	Raymond Mastrotto (FRA)
18	19 July	Pau to Bordeaux	206.5 km (128.3 mi)	Plain stage	Marino Basso (ITA)
19	20 July	Bordeaux to Limoges	217 km (135 mi)	Plain stage	Jean Stablinski (FRA)
20	21 July	Limoges to Puy-de-Dôme	222 km (138 mi)	Stage with mountain(s)	Felice Gimondi (ITA)
21	22 July	Clermont-Ferrand to Fontainebleau	359 km (223 mi)	Plain stage	Paul Lemeteyer (FRA)
22a	23 July	Fontainebleau to Versailles	104 km (65 mi)	Plain stage	René Binggeli (SUI)
22b	23 July	Versailles to Paris	46.6 km (29.0 mi)	Individual time trial	Raymond Poulidor (FRA)
	Total		4,779 km (2,970 mi)		

== Race overview ==
The prologue was won by Spanish José María Errandonea, with Raymond Poulidor in second place, six seconds behind. In the next few stages, the lead in the general classification changed hands several times, but the margins between the top favourites were small.

In the first part of the fifth stage, in Belgium, a group of fourteen cyclists including some Belgian cyclists escaped early in the stage. On the advice of his teammate Jean Stablinski, Roger Pingeon bridged the gap and joined the escaped group. The group stayed away, and Pingeon escaped 60 km before the finish, riding alone until the end of the stage. Pingeon won the stage, and also became the leader of the general classification.

Pingeon's lead was not challenged in the sixth stage, but he lost it in the seventh stage to his teammate Raymond Riotte, after Riotte was in a group that escaped. In the eighth stage, Riotte lost considerable time, and Pingeon was back in the lead. On that stage, Raymond Riotte lost more than 11 minutes, also because of a fall and mechanical problems, and announced that he would ride the rest of the Tour in support of Pingeon.

Pingeon gained a few seconds in the ninth stage after a split in the peloton. In the tenth stage, Poulidor helped Pingeon over the major climbs, and after that stage Pingeon had a margin of more than four minutes over the next rider, Désiré Letort from the Bleuets team.

The eleventh stage was won by 21-year old José Samyn; he is the youngest post-WW2 stage winner in the Tour de France as of 2024.

There were few changes in the general classification in the next two stages. The thirteenth stage was run in hot weather, and featured high climbs. During the climb of the Ventoux, Tom Simpson died. Unaware of what happened behind them, Jan Janssen won the stage, closely followed by Roger Pingeon, who extended his lead.

The riders in the peloton decided to ride the fourteenth stage in dedication of Tom Simpson, and let his teammate Barry Hoban win the stage.

In the sixteenth stage in the Pyrenees, Julio Jiménez won back a few minutes, and was now in second place behind Pingeon, 123 seconds behind. In the twentieth stage, with a finish on top of the Puy-de-Dôme, Jiménez won back some more time, and was now 1 minute and 39 seconds behind Pingeon. This was not enough to put Pingeon's victory in danger; the Tour ended with an individual time trial, and Pingeon rode it much better than Jiménez, and won the Tour de France of 1967.

== Classification leadership and minor prizes ==
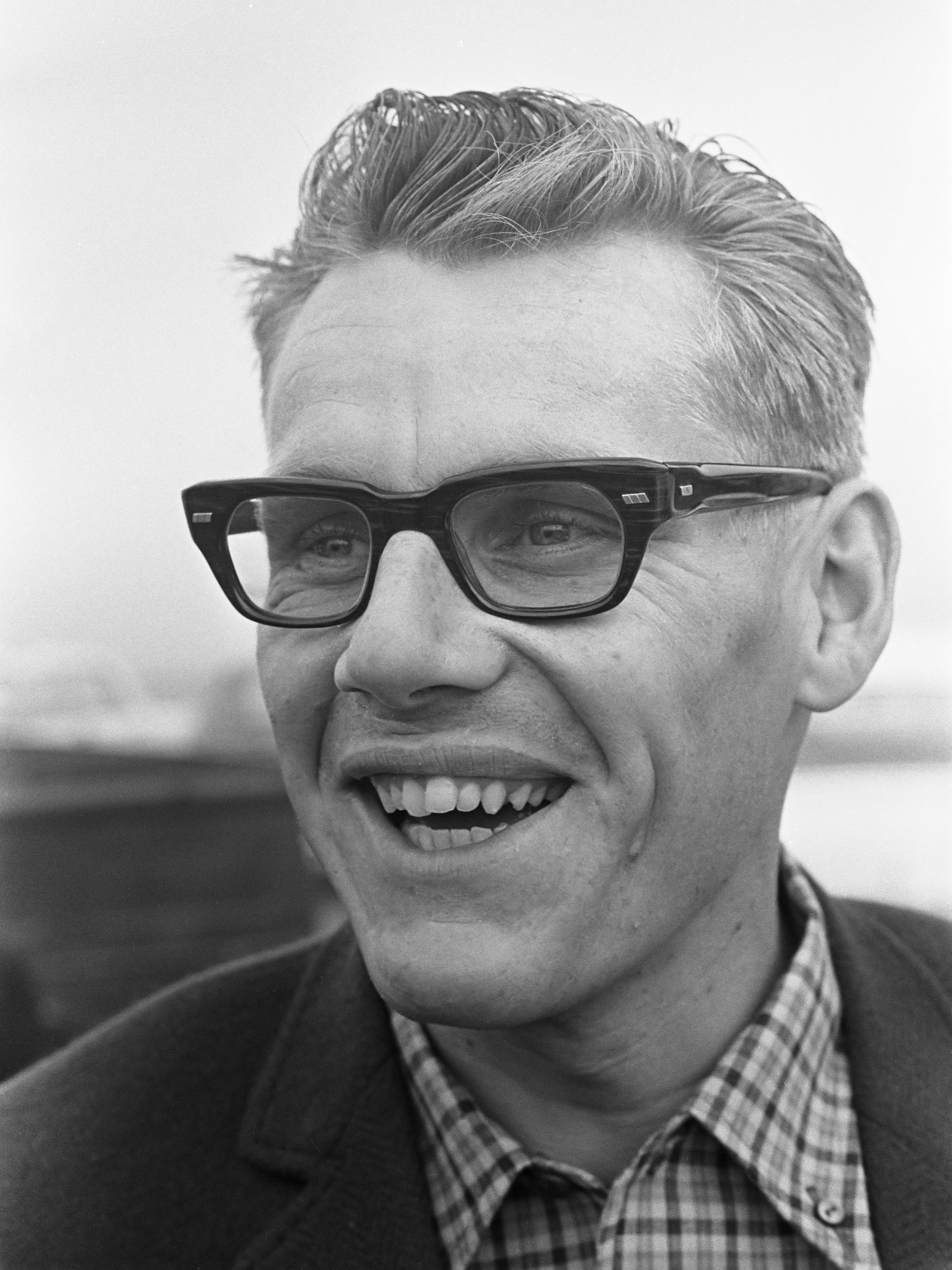
Jan Janssen, winner of the thirteenth stage and the points classification of the 1967 Tour de France.

There were several classifications in the 1967 Tour de France, two of them awarding jerseys to their leaders. The most important was the general classification, calculated by adding each cyclist's finishing times on each stage. The cyclist with the least accumulated time was the race leader, identified by the yellow jersey; the winner of this classification is considered the winner of the Tour. The 1967 Tour de France gave small time bonuses for winners of flat stages, but not for mountain stages.

Additionally, there was a points classification. In the points classification, cyclists got points for finishing among the best in a stage finish, or in intermediate sprints. The cyclist with the most points lead the classification, and was identified with a green jersey.

There was also a mountains classification. The organisation had categorised some climbs as either first, second, third, or fourth-category; points for this classification were won by the first cyclists that reached the top of these climbs first, with more points available for the higher-categorised climbs. The cyclist with the most points lead the classification, but was not identified with a jersey.

The intermediate sprints classification, introduced in 1966, was used again in 1967. Every stage had one intermediate sprint, and the first three riders at each sprint scored points. The intermediate sprints did not give a time bonus for the general classification, nor points for the points classification. There was no special jersey for the leader of this classification.

For the team classification, the times of the best three cyclists per team on each stage were added; the leading team was the team with the lowest total time. The riders in the team that led this classification wore yellow caps.

In addition, there was a combativity award, in which a jury composed of journalists gave points after each stage to the cyclist they considered most combative. The split stages each had a combined winner. At the conclusion of the Tour, Désiré Letort won the overall super-combativity award, also decided by journalists by a jury. The Souvenir Henri Desgrange was given to the first rider to pass the memorial to Tour founder Henri Desgrange near the summit of the Col du Galibier on stage 10. This prize was won by Julio Jiménez.

Classification leadership by stage
Stage	Winner	General classification	Points classification	Mountains classification (Note: No jersey was awarded to the leader of the mountains classification until a white jersey with red polka dots was introduced in 1975.)	Intermediate sprints classification	Team classification	Combativity award	Bad luck award
1a	José María Errandonea	José María Errandonea	José María Errandonea	no award	no award	Spain	Jean-Claude Lebaube	Johny Schleck
1b	Walter Godefroot	José María Errandonea	Walter Godefroot	Jean-Claude Lebaube	Christian Raymond	Spain	Jean-Claude Lebaube	Johny Schleck
2	Willy Van Neste	Willy Van Neste	Willy Van Neste	Jean-Claude Lebaube	Georges Chappe	France Bleuets	Lucien Aimar	Horst Oldenburg
3	Marino Basso	Giancarlo Polidori	Marino Basso	Michel Jacquemin	Jean Pierre Genet	France	Raymond Riotte	José María Errandonea
4	Guido Reybrouck	Jozef Spruyt	Gerben Karstens	Michel Jacquemin	Jean Pierre Genet	France	Joseph Spruyt	Johny Schleck
5a	Roger Pingeon	Roger Pingeon	Raymond Riotte	Michel Jacquemin	several riders	France	Roger Pingeon	Martin Van Den Bossche
5b	Belgium	Roger Pingeon	Raymond Riotte	Michel Jacquemin	several riders	France	Roger Pingeon	Martin Van Den Bossche
6	Herman Van Springel	Roger Pingeon	Gerben Karstens	Michel Jacquemin	several riders	France	Willy Van Neste	Remo Stefanoni
7	Michael Wright	Raymond Riotte	Raymond Riotte	Michel Jacquemin	Georges Vandenberghe	France	Luis Otaño	Rik Van Looy
8	Lucien Aimar	Roger Pingeon	Raymond Riotte	Guerrino Tosello	Christian Raymond	Italy Primavera	Jésus Aranzabal	Raymond Poulidor
9	Guido Reybrouck	Roger Pingeon	Guido Reybrouck	Guerrino Tosello	Christian Raymond	Italy Primavera	Jean-Claude Lebaube	Walter Godefroot
10	Felice Gimondi	Roger Pingeon	Guido Reybrouck	Julio Jiménez	Christian Raymond	France	Julio Jiménez	Guerrino Tosello
11	José Samyn	Roger Pingeon	Guido Reybrouck	Julio Jiménez	Georges Vandenberghe	France	Georges Chappe	Willy Van Neste
12	Raymond Riotte	Roger Pingeon	Guido Reybrouck	Julio Jiménez	Georges Vandenberghe	France	Raymond Riotte	Roger Milliot
13	Jan Janssen	Roger Pingeon	Guido Reybrouck	Julio Jiménez	Georges Vandenberghe	France	Julio Jiménez	Guido Marcello Mugnaini
14	Barry Hoban	Roger Pingeon	Guido Reybrouck	Julio Jiménez	Georges Vandenberghe	France	Barry Hoban	no award
15	Rolf Wolfshohl	Roger Pingeon	Guido Reybrouck	Julio Jiménez	Georges Vandenberghe	France	Rolf Wolfshohl	Guido Reybrouck
16	Fernando Manzaneque	Roger Pingeon	Jan Janssen	Julio Jiménez	Georges Vandenberghe	France	Fernando Manzaneque	Raymond Poulidor
17	Raymond Mastrotto	Roger Pingeon	Jan Janssen	Julio Jiménez	Georges Vandenberghe	France	Raymond Mastrotto	no award
18	Marino Basso	Roger Pingeon	Jan Janssen	Julio Jiménez	Georges Vandenberghe	France	Marino Basso	Mariano Díaz
19	Jean Stablinski	Roger Pingeon	Jan Janssen	Julio Jiménez	Georges Vandenberghe	France	Jos van der Vleuten	no award
20	Felice Gimondi	Roger Pingeon	Jan Janssen	Julio Jiménez	Georges Vandenberghe	France	Felice Gimondi	Alfred Rüegg
21	Paul Lemeteyer	Roger Pingeon	Jan Janssen	Julio Jiménez	Georges Vandenberghe	France	Pietro Scandelli	no award
22a	René Binggeli	Roger Pingeon	Jan Janssen	Julio Jiménez	Georges Vandenberghe	France	Michel Jacquemin	
22b	Raymond Poulidor	Roger Pingeon	Jan Janssen	Julio Jiménez	Georges Vandenberghe	France	Michel Jacquemin	
Final		Roger Pingeon	Jan Janssen	Julio Jiménez	Georges Vandenberghe	France	Désiré Letort	Raymond Poulidor

== Final standings ==
=== General classification ===
Janssen and Aimar were tied in time, but Janssen was ranked higher because he had more points in the points classification.

Final general classification (1–10)
Rank	Rider	Team	Time
1	Roger Pingeon (FRA)	France	136h 53' 50"
2	Julio Jiménez (ESP)	Spain	+ 3' 40"
3	Franco Balmamion (ITA)	Primavera	+ 7' 23"
4	Désiré Letort (FRA)	Bleuets	+ 8' 18"
5	Jan Janssen (NED)	Netherlands	+ 9' 47"
6	Lucien Aimar (FRA)	France	+ 9' 47"
7	Felice Gimondi (ITA)	Italy	+ 10' 14"
8	Jozef Huysmans (BEL)	Belgium	+ 16' 45"
9	Raymond Poulidor (FRA)	France	+ 18' 18"
10	Fernando Manzaneque (ESP)	Esperanza	+ 19' 22"

Final general classification (11–88)
Rank	Rider	Team	Time
11	Hans Junkermann (FRG)	Germany	+ 23' 02"
12	Willy Monty (BEL)	Belgium	+ 23' 06"
13	Frans Brands (BEL)	Belgium	+ 25' 08"
14	Cees Haast (NED)	Netherlands	+ 26' 23"
15	Franco Bodrero (ITA)	Primavera	+ 26' 30"
16	Noël Van Clooster (BEL)	Red Devils	+ 26' 40"
17	José Samyn (FRA)	Bleuets	+ 28' 42"
18	Ginés García (ESP)	Spain	+ 28' 56"
19	André Bayssière (FRA)	Coqs	+ 29' 23"
20	Johny Schleck (LUX)	Switzerland/Luxembourg	+ 32' 09"
21	Henri Rabaute (FRA)	Bleuets	+ 34' 42"
22	Giancarlo Polidori (ITA)	Primavera	+ 36' 04"
23	Jean-Claude Lebaube (FRA)	Coqs	+ 37' 23"
24	Herman Van Springel (BEL)	Belgium	+ 37' 54"
25	Wim Schepers (NED)	Netherlands	+ 38' 15"
26	Raymond Delisle (FRA)	Coqs	+ 39' 29"
27	Roberto Poggiali (ITA)	Italy	+ 40' 03"
28	Victor Van Schil (BEL)	Red Devils	+ 40' 36"
29	Jean-Claude Theillière (FRA)	Coqs	+ 40' 38"
30	Gerben Karstens (NED)	Netherlands	+ 40' 46"
31	Rolf Wolfshohl (FRG)	Germany	+ 41' 44"
32	Flaviano Vicentini (ITA)	Italy	+ 45' 02"
33	José-Manuel Lopez-Rodriguez (ESP)	Spain	+ 46' 32"
34	Ugo Colombo (ITA)	Italy	+ 47' 10"
35	Alfred Rüegg (SUI)	Switzerland/Luxembourg	+ 49' 23"
36	Raymond Mastrotto (FRA)	Coqs	+ 50' 10"
37	Georges Chappe (FRA)	Bleuets	+ 50' 24"
38	Jean Dumont (FRA)	Coqs	+ 50' 51"
39	Michel Grain (FRA)	Coqs	+ 52' 28"
40	Maurice Izier (FRA)	Bleuets	+ 52' 59"
41	Ventura Díaz (ESP)	Esperanza	+ 53' 20"
42	Guido Reybrouck (BEL)	Red Devils	+ 55' 39"
43	Paul In' t Ven (BEL)	Red Devils	+ 56'30"
44	Pietro Scandelli (ITA)	Primavera	+ 56' 43"
45	Georges Vandenberghe (BEL)	Belgium	+ 57' 49"
46	André Foucher (FRA)	France	+ 59' 41"
47	Jozef Spruyt (BEL)	Belgium	+ 1h 02' 12"
48	Angel Ibanez (ESP)	Esperanza	+ 1h 02' 19"
49	Luis-Pedro Santamarina (ESP)	Spain	+ 1h 02' 34"
50	Jesus Aranzabal (ESP)	Esperanza	+ 1h 02' 41"
51	Willy In' t Ven (BEL)	Red Devils	+ 1h 04'40"
52	Dieter Wiedemann (FRG)	Germany	+ 1h 06' 21"
53	Jean Monteyne (BEL)	Red Devils	+ 1h 06' 49"
54	Roger Swerts (BEL)	Red Devils	+ 1h 09' 57"
55	René Binggeli (SUI)	Switzerland/Luxembourg	+ 1h 10' 22"
56	Jorge Marine (ESP)	Esperanza	+ 1h 12' 05"
57	Christian Raymond (FRA)	Bleuets	+ 1h 15' 08"
58	Ambrogio Portalupi (ITA)	Primavera	+ 1h 15' 33"
59	Martin Vandenbossche (BEL)	Belgium	+ 1h 15' 37"
60	Walter Godefroot (BEL)	Red Devils	+ 1h 16' 03"
61	Claudio Michelotto (ITA)	Primavera	+ 1h 16' 48"
62	Barry Hoban (GBR)	Great Britain	+ 1h 17' 29"
63	Herbert Wilde (FRG)	Germany	+ 1h 18' 11"
64	Marino Basso (ITA)	Primavera	+ 1h 18' 14"
65	Luciano Dalla Bona (ITA)	Italy	+ 1h 18' 21"
66	Roger Milliot (FRA)	Bleuets	+ 1h 19' 45"
67	Jos van der Vleuten (NED)	Netherlands	+ 1h 20' 28"
68	Giancarlo Ferretti (ITA)	Italy	+ 1h 21' 40"
69	Arthur Metcalfe (GBR)	Great Britain	+ 1h 22' 37"
70	Louis Pfenninger (SUI)	Switzerland/Luxembourg	+ 1h 25' 03"
71	Huub Zilverberg (NED)	Netherlands	+ 1h 29' 26"
72	Raymond Riotte (FRA)	France	+ 1h 31' 59"
73	Bernard Vifian (SUI)	Switzerland/Luxembourg	+ 1h 32' 33"
74	José-Manuel Lasa (ESP)	Esperanza	+ 1h 34' 09"
75	Hubertus Harings (NED)	Netherlands	+ 1h 36' 06"
76	Jo de Roo (NED)	Netherlands	+ 1h 36' 13"
77	Michel Jacquemin (BEL)	Red Devils	+ 1h 40' 59"
78	Paul Lemeteyer (FRA)	France	+ 1h 41' 44"
79	Willy Spühler (SUI)	Switzerland/Luxembourg	+ 1h 43' 11"
80	Adriano Durante (ITA)	Italy	+ 1h 46' 38"
81	Jean Stablinski (FRA)	France	+ 1h 50' 07"
82	Karl Brand (SUI)	Switzerland/Luxembourg	+ 1h 55' 06"
83	Edouard Delberghe (FRA)	France	+ 1h 59' 36"
84	Colin Lewis (GBR)	Great Britain	+ 1h 59' 50"
85	Ramon Sáez (ESP)	Spain	+ 2h 04' 26"
86	Francis Blanc (SUI)	Switzerland/Luxembourg	+ 2h 05' 39"
87	Mario Minieri (ITA)	Italy	+ 2h 07' 55"
88	Jean-Pierre Genet (FRA)	France	+ 2h 21' 01"

=== Points classification ===
Final points classification (1–10)
Rank	Rider	Team	Points
1	Jan Janssen (NED)	Netherlands	154
2	Guido Reybrouck (BEL)	Red Devils	119
3	Georges Vandenberghe (BEL)	Belgium	111
4	Marino Basso (ITA)	Primavera	99
5	Gerben Karstens (NED)	Netherlands	98
6	Felice Gimondi (ITA)	Italy	96
7	Michel Grain (FRA)	Coqs	94
8	Roger Pingeon (FRA)	France	89
9	Raymond Riotte (FRA)	France	88
10	Paul Lemeteyer (FRA)	France	82

=== Mountains classification ===
Final mountains classification (1–10)
Rank	Rider	Team	Points
1	Julio Jiménez (ESP)	Spain	122
2	Franco Balmamion (ITA)	Primavera	68
3	Raymond Poulidor (FRA)	France	53
4	Felice Gimondi (ITA)	Italy	45
5	Roger Pingeon (FRA)	France	44
6	Jan Janssen (NED)	Netherlands	33
7	Désiré Letort (FRA)	Bleuets	32
7	Fernando Manzaneque (ESP)	Esperanza	32
9	Lucien Aimar (FRA)	France	31
10	Ventura Díaz (ESP)	Esperanza	26

=== Intermediate sprints classification ===
Final intermediate sprints classification (1–5)
Rank	Rider	Team	Points
1	Georges Vandenberghe (BEL)	Belgium	20
2	Christian Raymond (FRA)	Bleuets	16
3	Roger Milliot (FRA)	Bleuets	13
3	Michel Grain (FRA)	Coqs	13
5	Barry Hoban (GBR)	Great Britain	7

=== Team classification ===
Final team classification
Rank	Team	Time
1	France	412h 16' 54"
2	Netherlands	+ 38' 05"
3	Primavera	+ 43' 49"
4	Belgium	+ 54' 15"
5	Bleuets	+ 55' 26"
6	Spain	+ 59' 31"
7	Coqs	+ 1h 14' 52"
8	Red Devils	+ 1h 31' 55"
9	Esparanza	+ 1h 34' 25"
10	Italy	+ 1h 34' 30"
11	Germany	+ 1h 35' 45"
12	Switzerland/Luxembourg	+ 2h 01' 11"
13	Great Britain	+ 3h 51' 16"

== Doping ==
After the death of Tom Simpson on stage 13, there were accusations of doping use. The organisation decided to increase the doping controls, not only in the Tour but also in the simultaneously run Tour de l'Avenir. The Tour de France gave no positive tests, but several riders from the Tour de l'Avenir were disqualified. As in the 1966 Tour de France, doping tests were held on behalf of the French government. No positive tests were reported.

== Aftermath ==
From 1904 to 1967, the Tour de France had always finished in the Parc des Princes. Soon after the finish of the 1967 Tour de France, a renovation of the Parc des Princes was started, which would take several years. This made it unavailable for the Tour de France in 1968, and the Tour de France finish moved to the Vélodrome de Vincennes, and would never return to the Parc des Princes.

The introduction of the prologue was considered successful, and was repeated in the next years.

To make sprints safer, a rule had been introduced in 1967 to give riders that crashed in the last 500 meters of a stage the same time as the other riders. This rule has been maintained, and the 'safe distance' has increased first to 1000 meters and then to 3000 meters.

Up to 1966, the time limit had been fixed; in 1967 it depended on the average speed of the winner of the stage. It has remained like this ever since.

== Bibliography ==
- Augendre, Jacques (2016). Guide historique [Historical guide] (PDF) (in French). Paris: Amaury Sport Organisation. Archived (PDF) from the original on 17 August 2016.
- Cossins, Peter; Best, Isabel; Sidwells, Chris; Griffith, Clare (2013). Le Tour 100: The Definitive History of the World's Greatest Race. London: Hachette UK. ISBN 978-1-84403-759-9.
- McGann, Bill; McGann, Carol (2008). The Story of the Tour de France: 1965–2007. Vol. 2. Indianapolis: Dog Ear Publishing. ISBN 978-1-59858-608-4.
- Nauright, John; Parrish, Charles (2012). Sports Around the World: History, Culture, and Practice. Vol. 2. Santa Barbara, California: ABC-CLIO. ISBN 978-1-59884-300-2.
- van den Akker, Pieter (2018). Tour de France Rules and Statistics: 1903–2018. Self-published. ISBN 978-1-79398-080-9.
- van den Akker, Pieter (2023). Tour de France Rules and Statistics: 1903–2023. Self-published. ISBN 979-8859110544.
