= 1969 Tour de Suisse =

Race details
- Dates: 12–20 June 1969
- Stages: 9 + Prologue
- Distance: 1,501 km (932.7 mi)
- Winning time: 40h 30' 21"

Results
	Winner	Vittorio Adorni (ITA)	(Scic)
	Second	Aurelio González (ESP)	(Kas–Kaskol)
	Third	Bernard Vifian (SUI)	(Tigra)
	Points	Jan Janssen (NED)	(Bic)
	Mountains	Aurelio González (ESP)	(Kas–Kaskol)
	Team	Kas–Kaskol	

The 1969 Tour de Suisse was the 33rd edition of the Tour de Suisse cycle race and was held from 12 June to 20 June 1969. The race started in Zürich and finished in Zurzach. The race was won by Vittorio Adorni of the Scic team.

== General classification ==
Final general classification

Rank	Rider	Team	Time
1	Vittorio Adorni (ITA)	Scic	40h 30' 21"
2	Aurelio González (ESP)	Kas–Kaskol	+ 3' 48"
3	Bernard Vifian (SUI)	Tigra	+ 9' 35"
4	Wilfried David (BEL)	Flandria–De Clerck–Krüger	+ 10' 03"
5	Joaquim Galera (ESP)	Fagor	+ 10' 56"
6	Louis Pfenninger (SUI)	Zimba–Mondia	+ 11' 09"
7	Dieter Puschel (FRG)	Kas–Kaskol	+ 11' 10"
8	Herman Van Springel (BEL)	Dr. Mann–Grundig	+ 11' 51"
9	Willy Van Neste (BEL)	Dr. Mann–Grundig	+ 12' 05"
10	Jan Janssen (NED)	Bic	+ 12' 08"
