= Peter Chisman =

English cyclist

Personal information
- Full name: Peter John Chisman
- Nickname: Chis
- Born: 8 September 1940 United Kingdom
- Died: 23 October 2003 (aged 63)

Cycling career
- Sport: Cycling

Amateur team
- Houghton CC

Professional team
- 1966–1971: Raleigh BMB

Major wins
- 1963 Tour of Britain

Peter Chisman (8 September 1940 – 23 October 2003) was a British racing cyclist who won the Tour of Britain - known then as the Milk Race - in 1963. He led the race from beginning to end. He also rode in the 1967 Tour de France.

== Biography ==
Peter Chisman was born in Romford, Essex, on 8 September 1940. His parents were John and Nancy Chisman. He moved to Shiney Row, County Durham, his childhood home.

Peter Chisman was known to friends as Chis. He started his career by winning his first race, a cyclo-cross near Durham. He rode on a bike borrowed from a friend. That led him to join the Houghton CC when he was 14. He won six races in 1958, including the junior road race championship of north-east England. He won 12 single-day races and a four-day race in 1960. His amateur wins included the Tour of the Lakes, the White Rose two-day and the Red Rose two-day.

He was picked in 1961 for the North of England team in the Milk Race. He won two stages and finished fourth. That brought him promotion to the England team in 1963. He won five stages, including the first, and wore the yellow jersey of race leader from beginning to end.

He turned professional in 1966 for Raleigh-BMB with Arthur Metcalfe, John Aslin, Bernard Burns and George Shaw and started the Tour de France the following year. But he never had the same success as he had enjoyed as an amateur and he stopped racing in 1971. He worked as a civil engineer for local councils. Throughout his racing life he was a member of Houghton CC apart from a brief period with Cheviot CC.

Chisman never stopped cycling, sometimes riding 180 miles a day. Eight weeks before his death he rode 130 miles from Sunderland to Edinburgh to visit his grandchildren. It took him eight hours.

Chisman died in hospital in Sunderland on 23 October 2003 after a prostate operation His racing companion, Dave Thornton, said at his funeral:

We have come to pay our respects to a champion, but more than that, to a modest champion, a quiet unassuming sportsman in the true sense of the word, a true gentleman who was universally respected and liked. Peter will not be forgotten, he will be remembered around the table in our favourite 'tea-stops', as he was last Sunday, and he will be with us in spirit in the high hills, where he battled it out with the best.
