= Peter Hill =

Peter or Pete Hill may refer to:

== Arts and entertainment ==
- Peter Murray-Hill (1908–1957), British actor
- Peter Buckley Hill (born 1948), British musical comedian
- Peter Hill (pianist) (born 1948), British pianist and musicologist

== Sports ==
- Pete Hill (John Preston Hill, 1882–1951), American baseball player
- Peter Hill (cricketer) (1923–2002), Australian cricketer
- Peter Hill (footballer) (1931–2015), English footballer
- Peter Hill (cyclist) (born 1945), British cyclist
- Peter Hill (Paralympian) (born 1957), Australian Paralympic swimmer and athlete
- Peter Hill (entrepreneur) (born 1964), Australian skateboarder, entrepreneur and media producer

== Others ==
- Peter Hill (clockmaker) (1767–1820), American clockmaker
- Ployer Peter Hill (1894–1935), known as Peter, American test pilot
- Peter Clegg-Hill, 9th Viscount Hill (born 1945), British peer
- Peter Hill (journalist) (born 1945), British former editor of the UK newspaper Daily Express
- Peter Hill (bishop) (born 1950), British bishop of Barking
- Peter Hill (active 2003), British author of Stargazing: Memoirs of a Young Lighthouse Keeper
- Peter Hill (civil servant), British civil servant
- Peter John Hill (born 1953), Australian outlaw biker and gangster

== See also ==
- Peter Hill-Wood (1936–2018), British businessman and football club chairman
- Peters Hill (disambiguation)
- Peter Youngblood Hills (born 1978), Anglo-American actor
- Hill (surname)
