= Herbie Sykes =

British sportswriter

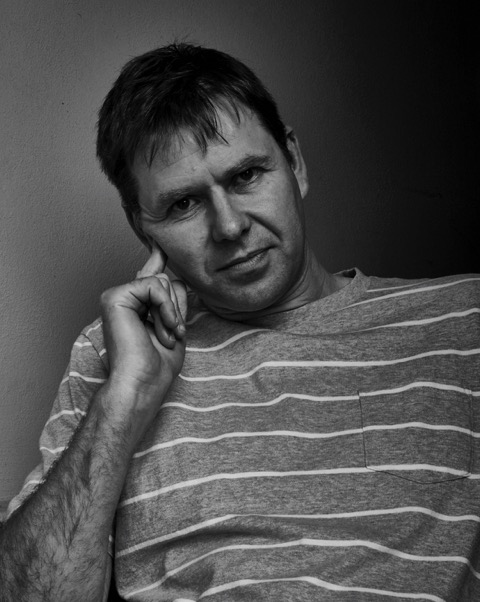

Herbie Sykes is a British sports journalist and writer. His first book, The Eagle of the Canavese, was published in 2008. A biography of the Italian cyclist Franco Balmamion, it's framed through the story of his victory at the 1962 Giro d'Italia. It was revised and reprinted as Balmamion by Rapha in 2020.

Maglia Rosa, an illustrated history of the Giro d'Italia, was published in 2011. The first work of its kind in the English language, it was the Podiumcafe.com cycling book of the year.

Coppi - Inside the Legend of the Campionissimo, was published by Bloomsbury in 2012. A photographic biography of Fausto Coppi, it features first-hand testimony from 21 of his contemporaries. It was a Metro book of the year and was shortlisted in the illustrated book category at the British Sports Book of the Year awards.

Sykes' fourth book, The Race against the Stasi, was published in September 2014. A biographical study of the defected East German cyclist Dieter Wiedemann, it explores the politicisation of Soviet Bloc sport through the mythical Peace Race. It won the Cycling Book of the Year at the Cross British Sports Book Awards and was nominated in the outstanding general sportswriting category. In addition it was a Guardian sports book of the year.

The Giro 100 was released in 2017. It featured interviews with 100 of the Giro d'Italia's constituents by way of celebrating the centenary edition of the race.

In 2020 Sykes wrote Juve! 100 Years of an Italian Football Dynasty. Published by Penguin Random House, the book examines the history and cultural significance of Juventus FC through the vicissitudes of the Agnelli family, the club's owners. It was a Financial Times Sports Book of the Year.

2022 saw the release of Dear Hugo, an epistolary novel about the Tour de France winner Hugo Koblet.

== Bibliography ==
- Eagle of the Canavese. Norwich, UK: Mousehold Press. 2008. ISBN 978-1-874739-49-4.
- Coppi: Inside the Legend of the Campionissimo. Rouleur Series. London: A & C Black. 2012. ISBN 978-1-4081-8166-9.
- Maglia Rosa 2nd edition: Triumph and Tragedy at the Giro D'Italia. Rouleur Series. London: A & C Black. 2013. ISBN 978-1-4081-9001-2.
- The Race against the Stasi. London: Aurum Press. 2014. ISBN 978-1-7813-1308-4.
- The Giro 100. London: Rapha. 2017. ISBN 978-1-9121-6400-4.
- Juve! 100 Years of an Italian Footballing Dynasty. London: Yellow Jersey. 2020. ISBN 978-1-7872-9050-1.
- Dear Hugo. London: Rapha. 2022. ISBN 978-1-9121-6419-6.
