= Peters Hill =

Peters Hill may refer to:

- Peters Hill (South Australia), a peak in the Belvidere Range in South Australia
- Peters Hill Limestone, a geologic formation in Jamaica

== See also ==
- Peter Hill (disambiguation)
