= José Goyeneche =

Spanish cyclist (born 1941)

Personal information
- Born: 15 October 1941 (age 85) Arrieta, Spain

Cycling career
- Sport: Cycling
- Discipline: Road

Professional teams
- 1965: Olsa
- 1967: Fagor
- 1968: Karpy

José Goyeneche (born 15 October 1941) is a former Spanish cyclist. He competed in the team time trial at the 1964 Summer Olympics. He also rode in the 1967 Tour de France and two editions of the Vuelta a España.

== Major results ==
1966
1st Overall Cinturón a Mallorca
3rd Vuelta a Cantabria
1968
1st Stage 1 Vuelta a los Valles Mineros
2nd Overall Vuelta a La Rioja
10th Trofeo Masferrer
