= Ángel Ibáñez =

Spanish cyclist

Personal information
- Full name: Ángel Ibáñez Lahoz
- Born: 3 January 1939 (age 87) Bárboles, Aragon, Spain

Cycling career
- Sport: Cycling
- Discipline: Road
- Role: Rider

Professional teams
- 1962: CC Tarragona–FHIMSSA
- 1963–1966: Picadero Jockey Club
- 1966-1968: Ferrys
- 1969: Pepsi-Cola

Major wins
- 1 stage Vuelta a España (1967)

Ángel Ibáñez (born 3 January 1939) is a Spanish former cyclist, who was professional between 1962 and 1969. In the 1967 Vuelta a España, Ibáñez won the 13th stage and finished 41st overall. Finally, Angel Ibáñez manages to reach the foot of the Basilica of El Pilar two and a half minutes before the dozen pursuers who, in turn, lead the great platoon in thirty-eight seconds more. Competed in Vallmoll near Tarragona for 80 kilometers, Ángel Ibáñez won with more than three minutes ahead of his closest pursuers.

== Biography ==
Ángel Ibáñez was born in Bárboles, Aragon on January 3, 1939. Ángel Ibáñez started in Torredembarra in 1959. As an amateur Ángel Ibáñez was the amateur 1961, 1964 and mountain 1961 champion of Catalonia, and the provincial champion 1963–65. Ibáñez competed professionally with the Ferrys team from 1966 to 1968 and Pepsi-Cola in 1969. Ángel Ibáñez was champion of Spain by region 1968 and won a stage of the Vuelta a Andalucía 1966, the Vuelta a España 1967, the Euskal Bizikleta 1967 and the race of San Salvador del Valle 1968. Ángel Ibáñez contested four Vueltas a España 1966-69 and a Tour de France 1967. The modest Aragonese Angel Ibáñez, from the Ferrys team, undertakes a solo adventure, a crazy chimera, when just four kilometers of race have been covered.

== Major results ==
1962
3rd Trofeo Jaumendreu
1964
1st GP Catalunya
1965
1st Trofeo Borras
7th Trofeo Masferrer
1966
1st Overall Vuelta a Mallorca
8th Overall Vuelta a Andalucía

1st Stage 3

1967
1st Stage 13 Vuelta a España
6th Overall Euskal Bizikleta

1st Stage 1

1968
9th Overall Volta a Catalunya

=== Grand Tour results ===
==== Tour de France ====
- 1967: 48

==== Vuelta a España ====
- 1966: DNF
- 1967: 41
- 1968: DNF
- 1969: 50
