= Bárboles =

Bárboles, Spain
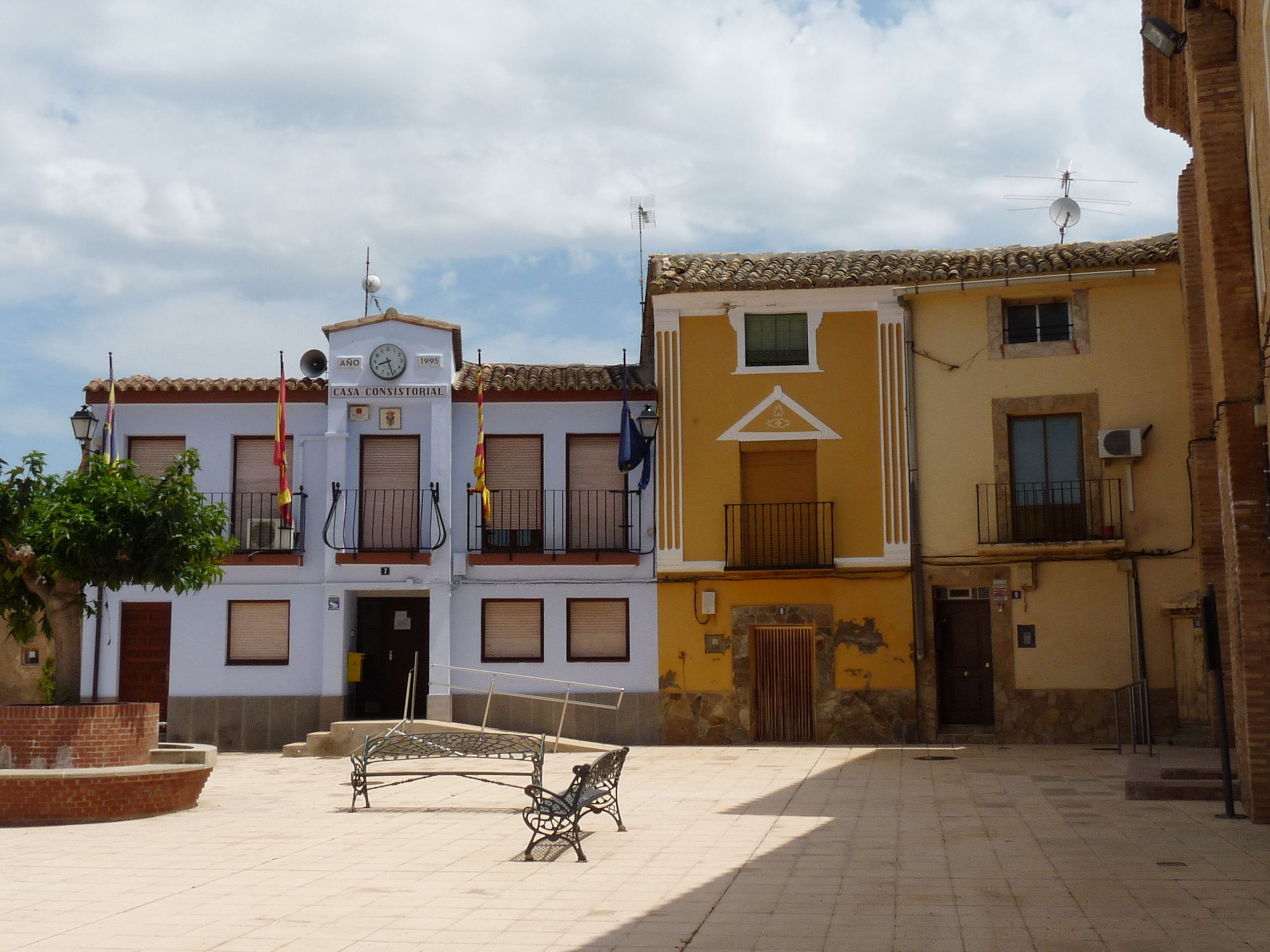
- Town hall

- Flag Coat of arms

- Location within Aragon Location within Spain Location within Europe
- Coordinates: 41°43′N 1°11′W
- Country: Spain
- Autonomous community: Aragon
- Province: Zaragoza
- Municipality: Bárboles

Area
  - Total: 15 km^{2} (5.8 sq mi)

Population (2025-01-01)
  - Total: 277
  - Density: 18/km^{2} (48/sq mi)
- Time zone: UTC+1 (CET)
  - Summer (DST): UTC+2 (CEST)
- Postal code: 50297

Bárboles is a municipality located in the province of Zaragoza, Aragon, Spain. According to the 2004 census (INE), the municipality has a population of 318 inhabitants.

== Geography ==
Bárboles is located 32 kilometers from Zaragoza on the banks of the Jalón river.

== See also ==
- List of municipalities in Zaragoza
