= Dieter Wiedemann =

German cyclist

Personal information
- Born: 17 June 1941 (age 85) Flöha, East Germany

Cycling career
- Sport: Cycling
- Role: Rider

Dieter Wiedemann (born 17 June 1941) is a German racing cyclist. He rode in the 1967 Tour de France. He was the subject of a book by Herbie Sykes, The Race Against the Stasi (2013), in which Sykes writes about Wiedemann's sporting career and defection from East to West Germany.
