= Sanson (cycling team) =

Cycling teams with the name Sanson, sponsored by the Italian food producer Sanson, include:

- Carpano (cycling team), known as Sanson in 1965 and 1966
- Sanson (cycling team, 1969), known as Sanson in 1969
- Filotex (cycling team), known as Sanson from 1976 to 1980
