= René Binggeli =

Swiss cyclist

Personal information
- Full name: René Binggeli
- Born: 17 January 1941 Geneva, Switzerland
- Died: 27 September 2007 (aged 66)

Cycling career
- Sport: Cycling
- Discipline: Road
- Role: Rider

Major wins
- 1 stage Tour de France; 1 stage Giro d'Italia

René Binggeli (Geneva, 17 January 1941 — Geneva, 27 September 2007) was a Swiss professional road bicycle racer. Binggeli won a stage in the 1965 Giro d'Italia and in the 1967 Tour de France.

== Major results ==
1960
Porrentruy-Zürich
1963
Mont Agel
1965
Giro d'Italia:

Winner stage 22

1967
Tour de France:

Winner stage 22A

GP Piquet
