= André Bayssière =

French cyclist (born 1943)

Personal information
- Born: 28 August 1943 (age 83)

Cycling career
- Sport: Cycling
- Role: Rider

André Bayssière (born 28 August 1943) is a French racing cyclist. He rode in the 1967 Tour de France.
