= Jozef Spruyt =

Belgian cyclist

Personal information
- Full name: Jozef Spruyt
- Born: 25 February 1943 (age 83) Viersel, Belgium

Cycling career
- Sport: Cycling
- Discipline: Road
- Role: Rider

Major wins
- 3 stages Tour de France; Brabantse Pijl

Jozef Spruyt also written Joseph Spruyt (born 25 February 1943) is a Belgian former professional road bicycle racer. His profession was a metal worker and his sporting career began with Lierse B.C. Spruyt was a professional from 1965 to 1975. Spruyt won three stage wins in the Tour de France; one in 1969, one in 1970 and one in 1974. He also wore the yellow jersey as leader of the general classification for one day in the 1967 Tour de France. Other highlights from his career include winning Brabantse Pijl and the Scheldeprijs Vlaanderen.

== Major results ==
1963
Gent-Ieper
1964
Course de la Paix:

Winner stage 11

1965
Druivenkoers
1966
Scheldeprijs Vlaanderen
1967
Turnhout
Assent
Tour de France:

Leading general classification after stage 4

1968
Kessel–Lier
Mol
1969
Tour de France:

Winner stage 22A

Stabroek
Turnhout
1970
Tour de France:

Winner stage 5B

1971
Brabantse Pijl
1973
Tessenderlo
Willebroek
Eernegem
1974
Tour de France:

Winner stage 12

1976
Melle
