= Bernard Vifian =

Swiss cyclist

Personal information
- Born: 16 December 1944 Hermance, Switzerland
- Died: 18 June 2012 (aged 67) La Rivière-Enverse, France

Cycling career
- Sport: Cycling
- Role: Rider

Bernard Vifian (16 December 1944 – 18 June 2012) was a Swiss racing cyclist. He was the Swiss National Road Race champion in 1969. He also rode in the 1967 and 1970 Tour de France.
