= Peter Hill (cyclist) =

British cyclist

Personal information
- Born: 4 June 1945 (age 81)

Cycling career
- Sport: Cycling
- Role: Rider

Peter Hill (born 4 June 1945) is a British racing cyclist. He rode in the 1967 Tour de France.
