= Herbert Wilde =

German cyclist (1940–2018)

Personal information
- Full name: Herbert Hermann Wilde
- Born: 31 July 1940 Gotenhafen, German occupied Poland
- Died: 25 September 2018 (aged 78) Dortmund, Germany
- Height: 172 cm (5 ft 8 in)

Cycling career
- Sport: Cycling
- Role: Rider

Herbert Wilde (31 July 1940 – 25 September 2018) is a German racing cyclist. He rode in the 1967 Tour de France.
