= Dieter Puschel =

German cyclist

Personal information
- Born: 23 June 1939 Berlin, Germany
- Died: 31 May 1992 (aged 52) Stommeln, Germany

Cycling career
- Sport: Cycling
- Role: Rider

Dieter Puschel (23 June 1939 – 31 May 1992) was a German racing cyclist. He won the German National Road Race in 1962.
