= Michel Jacquemin =

Belgian cyclist

Personal information
- Born: 27 September 1942 (age 84)

Cycling career
- Sport: Cycling
- Role: Rider

Michel Jacquemin (born 27 September 1942) is a Belgian racing cyclist. He rode in the 1967 Tour de France.
