= Désiré Letort =

French cyclist (1943–2012)

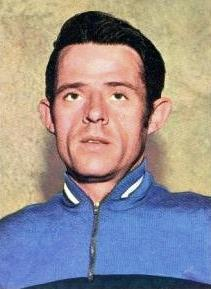
- Désiré Letort (1971), 'Sprint 71', Panini figurine n ° 84.

Personal information
- Full name: Désiré Letort
- Born: 29 January 1943 Corseul, France
- Died: 9 September 2012 (aged 69)

Cycling career
- Sport: Cycling
- Discipline: Road
- Role: Rider

Professional teams
- 1970: BIC
- 1973: Gitane-Frigécrème

Désiré Letort (29 January 1943 – 9 September 2012) was a French cyclist. His sporting career began with ACBB Paris. His career best finishes in the Tour de France were 17th in 1971, 9th in 1969 and 4th in 1967.

== Biography ==
Letort was born in Corseul. He won the French national road race championship in 1967, but after the race failed the doping tests.

Letort raced in eight Tours de France. He wore the yellow jersey in the 1969 Tour de France for one day after stage 5.

== Major results ==
1963
French military champion
Circuit des deux provinces
1966
Paris–Camembert
Sévignac
1967
~~France national road race championship~~ failed doping test
Sévignac
1968
Critérium de Saint-Georges-de-Chesné
1969
Ploerdut
Laval
Plancoet
1970
Issé
Hénon
1971
Nice-Seillans

== Grand tour results ==
=== Tour de France ===
- 1965 : DNF (=Did Not Finish)
- 1966 : 57
- 1967 : 4 (winner combativity award)
- 1968 : DNF
- 1969 : 9
- 1970 : DNF
- 1971 : 17
- 1972 : DNF

=== Vuelta a España ===
- 1967 : 27
- 1971 : 26
- 1972 : DNF

=== Giro d'Italia ===
- 1972 : DNF
