= Raymond Riotte =

French cyclist (1940–2026)

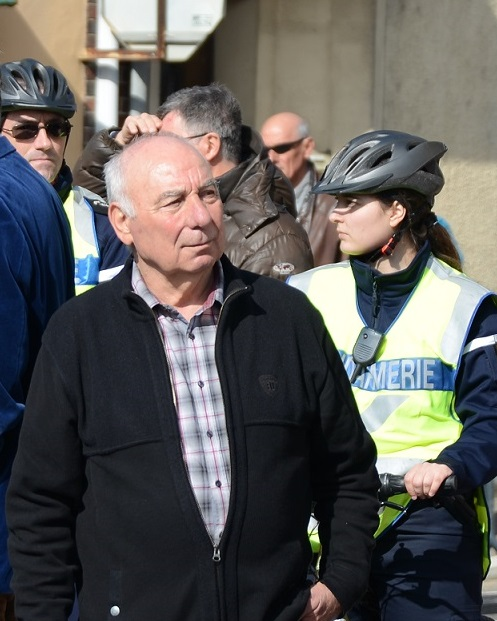
- Riotte in 2014

Personal information
- Full name: Raymond Riotte
- Born: 16 February 1940 Sarry, France
- Died: 14 April 2026 (aged 86)

Cycling career
- Sport: Cycling
- Discipline: Road
- Role: Rider

Professional teams
- 1966–1967: Bic
- 1968–1969: Mercier - BP - Hutchinson
- 1970–1973: Sonolor
- 1974–1975: Peugeot - BP - Michelin

Major wins
- Grand Tours Tour de France 1 individual stage (1967) One-day races and Classics Paris–Camembert (1969)

Raymond Riotte (16 February 1940 – 14 April 2026) was a French professional road bicycle racer. He was professional from 1966 to 1975 and won 22 races. He participated in eight editions of the Tour de France, winning a stage in the 1967 Tour de France as well as wearing the yellow jersey as leader of the general classification for one day. Other victories include two wins in the Tour de Seignelay, one win in Paris–Camembert, and stage wins in Paris–Nice, the Grand Prix du Midi Libre, and the Semana Catalane. Riotte was a teammate of Jacques Anquetil, Bernard Thévenet, Raymond Poulidor, Lucien Aimar and of Lucien Van Impe.

Riotte died on 14 April 2026, at the age of 86.

== Major results ==
1967
Bordeaux - Saintes
Tour de Seignelay
Tour de France:

Winner stage 12
Wearing yellow jersey for one day

1969
Auxerre
Fourchambault
Paris–Camembert
Saint-Tropez
1970
Garancières-en-Beauce
1971
Saint-Claud
1972
Quilan
1974
Tour de Seignelay
