= Arthur Metcalfe =

English cyclist

Personal information
- Full name: Arthur Metcalfe
- Born: 27 September 1938 Leeds, England, United Kingdom
- Died: 11 December 2002 (aged 64) Harrogate, England, United Kingdom

Cycling career
- Sport: Cycling
- Discipline: Road
- Role: Rider

Professional teams
- 1967–1968: Carlton – B.M.B.
- 1969–1970: Carlton – Truwel

Arthur Metcalfe (27 September 1938 – 11 December 2002) was a British racing cyclist who twice rode the Tour de France and, as an amateur remains the only male rider to win the British road race championship and the British Best All-Rounder (BBAR) time trial competition in the same year.

== Origins ==
Born in Leeds, Yorkshire on 27 September 1938, Arthur Metcalfe was the second of three brothers born to a cycling family. His father was a cycle-tourist. The family moved to Hartlepool when Arthur was 14. He was described then as a weak child. There he joined Hartlepool Cycling Club. On his second day as a member he rode the club's 25-mile (40 km) time trial, "leaving many of his contemporaries trailing."

== Amateur career ==
Metcalfe—known among fellow professionals as "the snake" for his talent in wriggling into the winning break of a race—was handicapped at first by two years' compulsory national service with the army. He, like his brother Ken, was a military policeman in Cyprus. He soon made a name on leaving the army at 21 and in 1962 came 23rd in his first ride in the Tour of Britain, known then as the Milk Race. In 1964 he took the race yellow jersey after winning alone in the stage to Cardiff and he held the lead to the finish in Blackpool. He was celebrated for the long, lone attacks he often made through hilly countryside.

His obituary in The Daily Telegraph described him as "always physically tough and tactically astute."

In the same year, he also won two stages of the Tour du St Laurent in Canada. The British enthusiast, Mike Breckon, who saw Metcalfe in that race, said:

"It was a world-class field and over tough terrain. The British team had a tough time with crashes and punctures. But then Arthur decided to do something about it. On the last four stages of the race he finished first, sixth, first and third. ... Including a display of climbing ... which left some of the world's best riders grovelling."

In 1965 he won 23 times, including the Manx International, three laps of the Snaefell mountain course on the Isle of Man. Living once more in Leeds, he cycled from there to Liverpool, slept in a telephone box and then caught the ferry to the island. In 1966 he won the national amateur road race championship and, as an afterthought, the BBAR with a record average speed of 24.797 mph. The BBAR aggregated speeds of riders over 50 miles, 100 miles and 12 hours and specialist time-triallists usually devote their whole season to it. Metcalfe won in three straight rides, almost as an afterthought. "I remember thinking I needed a change. I'd ridden a few time trials in the past and so I thought I'd have another go," he said.

== Professional career ==
Having done all he could in Britain as an amateur, he turned professional in 1967 for Carlton Cycles, part of the Raleigh group of companies. The British professional scene was expanding but there was still little money and Metcalfe worked in Carlton's offices at Worksop, although he was allowed two mornings a week to train. Months later he rode the Tour de France during a break from work, a fact that persuaded French journalists that all the British team were similarly riding in their holidays.

In 1967 and 1968 the Tour was open to national rather than the usual commercially sponsored teams that had made up the race since 1930. Britain's professionals – Tom Simpson, Barry Hoban, Vin Denson and Michael Wright – all rode full-time and for well-established teams on the Continent. Metcalfe was one of a few less-prepared riders chosen from Britain to make up the numbers. Metcalfe finished 69th in 1967, riding as a domestique to Simpson, the team's only likely winner.

Simpson died on the 13th stage of the race as he was climbing Mont Ventoux. Metcalfe and the rest of the team voted to continue. Metcalfe said: "I was in a right state. I just stood on my own all night. I was crying. It was the emotional strain on top of the physical strain. There was a lot of talk about whether we should pull out. [The manager, Alec Taylor] felt we should stay in, so we just rode on. The rest of the race was a blur."

Metcalfe rode the Tour again in 1968, heading the race alone on the stage to Bayonne and winning a prize as the day's most combative rider. He abandoned the Tour just before the end.

== After the Tour ==
Metcalfe broke his pelvis in 1971, ending his career as a professional. He and a fellow professional, Wes Mason of Sheffield, opened a business building racing-cycle frames in a former chapel in Harrogate, Yorkshire. The building, Chapel Works, was owned by a cycle importer, Ron Kitching, and their combined initials gave the project's name: MKM. The company had the British licence to build frames under the name of the Tour de France winner, Jacques Anquetil. MKM operated until the late 1970s.

Ron Kitching said:

They were both keen on bicycle manufacturing. Wes was a good frame builder and Arthur was sure that he could handle the marketing. I went so far as to buy the premises – an old chapel on Skipton Road, and agreed to the company's name, MKM. But I decided in the end not to become involved in the venture. Imagine being sandwiched between two crafty bike-riders like that! In the end it was the right decision, they fell out and the business failed. I was left with the property.

Metcalfe said of the modern Tour de France that it was too short, that it should be "a proper length" – 2,500 miles.

To ride 90 miles a day is not the legend of the Tour de France. The philosophy of the Tour is that it's an epic of courage. We had stages of 233 km. Sure, they go 2mph faster now, but you'd expect that. And there are 70 more riders. I was working for Carlton Cycles. British riders are all full-time pros now and they're better than ever we were, so they can ride further. The argument is that they want a clean Tour. But you can ride 2,500 miles clean. The race may go 1mph slower but from the roadside you'd never notice it. You can't see a difference that small.

== South Africa ==
The broken pelvis took two years to mend. By then, Metcalfe had been reinstated as an amateur by the British Cycling Federation (BCF). He moved to South Africa for work and won the Rapport Tour, a stage race. South Africa was still in the apartheid era and excluded from world sport. For riding the race, Metcalfe was suspended by the British Cycling Federation.

Metcalfe was bitter about the suspension until the end of his life. Because he had also coached young riders while he was in South Africa, he said: "You think they would have given me a medal for that, not a suspension."

== After racing ==
Metcalfe served his suspension, then began riding again with Hartlepool cycling club, setting records for 100 miles and 12 hours that still stood at his death. Metcalfe was a manager of the Carlton professional team for which he had once ridden and in 1987 managed the British professional team in the Milk Race. He worked as an insurance salesman and financial adviser in Leeds. He remained a cyclist and said six months before his death that his cancer had been diagnosed after he had seen a doctor because he could suddenly no longer ride as fast as he could. He died in Harrogate on 11 December 2002 just months after moving to France with his third wife, Anne. A mass ride is held in Yorkshire in his memory.

== Palmarès ==
Amateur

1964 – 1st Milk Race, 1st points and mountains competition 1965 – 1st Welwyn two-day 1965 – 1st Manx Trophy 1965 – 1st Red Rose GP 1965 – 6th Milk Race 1966 – National champion 1966 – BBAR time-trial champion 1966 – 1st Ariel two-day 1966 – 12th Milk Race

Professional

1967 – 1st Bournemouth three-day 1967 – 2nd Vaux GP 1968 – 1st Folkestone-London 1968 – 1st Tour of the West 1968 – 1st Manx Trophy 1969 – 1st Teesside 1970 – 1st Percy Lewis

Amateur

1971 – 1st Rapport Tour
