= Franco Bodrero =

Italian cyclist

Personal information
- Born: 7 February 1943
- Died: 31 July 1970 (aged 28)

Cycling career
- Sport: Cycling
- Role: Rider

Franco Bodrero (7 February 1943 – 31 July 1970) was an Italian racing cyclist. He rode in the 1967 Tour de France.
