= Flaviano Vicentini =

Italian cyclist (1942–2002)

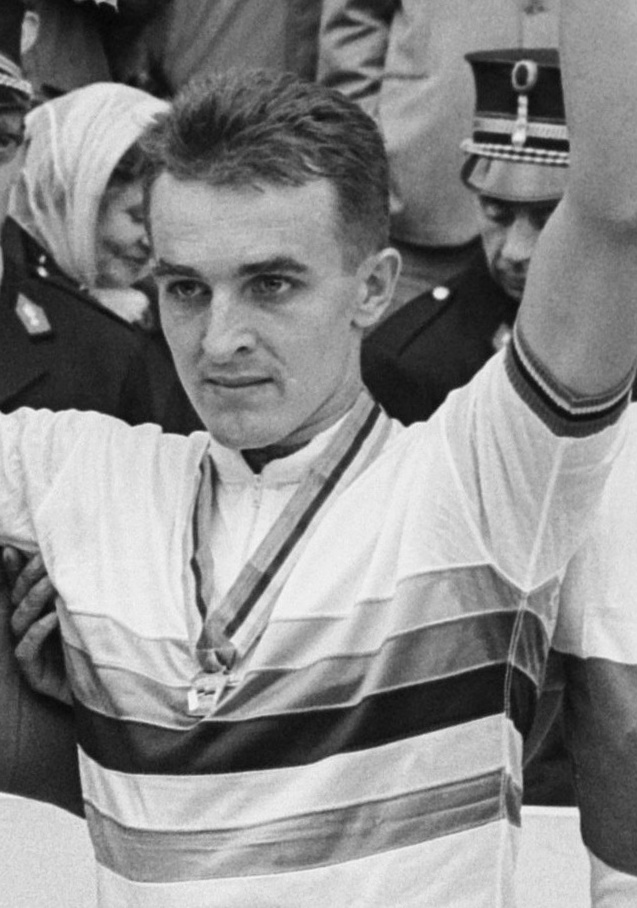
- Vicentini at the 1963 UCI Road World Championships

Personal information
- Born: 21 June 1942 Grezzana, Italy
- Died: 31 December 2002 (aged 60) Verona, Italy

Cycling career
- Sport: Cycling
Medal record
Representing Italy
Men's road bicycle racing
World Championships
Gold medal – first place	1963 Renaix	Amateur's Road Race

Flaviano Vicentini (21 June 1942 – 31 December 2002) was an Italian road race cyclist who was active between 1963 and 1971. After becoming the world champion in 1963 as amateur, he turned professional. He then won the Grand Prix de Cannes in 1966 and the Giro del Lazio in 1969. In 1968 and 1969 he also won one stage at the Volta a Catalunya.
