= Paul Lemeteyer =

French cyclist

Personal information
- Full name: Paul Lemeteyer
- Born: June 4, 1942 (age 84) Nantes, France

Cycling career
- Sport: Cycling
- Current team: Retired
- Discipline: Road
- Role: Rider
- Rider type: Sprinter

Major wins
- 1 stage Tour de France

Paul Lemeteyer (Nantes, 4 June 1942) was a French professional road bicycle racer.

== Major results ==
1964
Paris - Ezy
1965
Camors
1966
Nantes
Ploeuc
1967
Tour de France:

Winner stage 21

1968
Concarneau
Trofeo Jaumendreu
1969
Saint-Clet
St Ciet
Pleyber-Christ
