= Franco Balmamion =

Italian cyclist (born 1940)

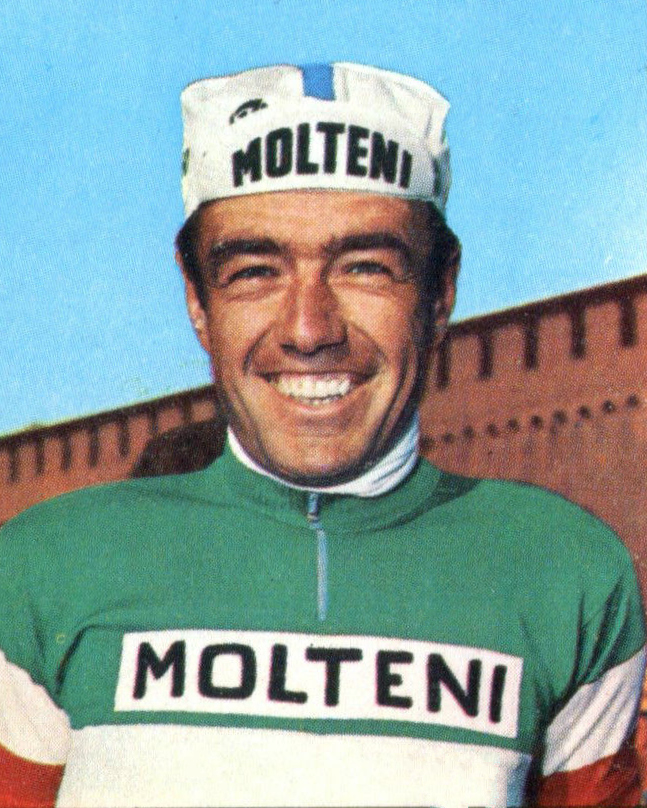
- Balmamion c. 1968

Personal information
- Full name: Franco Balmamion
- Born: 11 January 1940 (age 86) Nole, Italy

Cycling career
- Sport: Cycling
- Discipline: Road
- Role: Rider

Professional teams
- 1961: Bianchi
- 1962–1963: Carpano
- 1964: Cynar
- 1965–1966: Sanson
- 1967–1968: Molteni
- 1969–1970: Salvarani
- 1971–1972: Scic

Major wins
- Grand Tours Giro d'Italia General classification (1962, 1963) One-day races and Classics Italian National Road Race Championship (1967)

Franco Balmamion (born 11 January 1940) is an Italian former professional road racing cyclist who raced between 1960 and 1972. The top of his career was two successive wins in the 1962 and 1963 editions of the Giro d'Italia.

== Major results ==
1960
10th National Amateur Road Championships

1961
3rd Giro dell'Emilia

1962
1st Overall Giro d'Italia
2nd Overall Tour de Suisse
1st Milano–Torino
1st Giro dell'Appennino
2nd Maggiora Criterium
3rd Tre Valli Varesine
10th Pernod–Super Prestige

1963
1st Overall Giro d'Italia
1st Meisterschaft von Zürich
3rd Giro del Veneto
6th Giro dell'Appennino
9th Tre Valli Varesine

1964
2nd GP du Parisien
3rd Giro dell'Appennino
6th Coppa Sabatini
8th Overall Giro d'Italia
10th Coppa Agostoni

1965
1st Caen Team Time trial
2nd Circuito Ciclistico di Ciriè
3rd Milan–San Remo
3rd Nice–Genova
3rd Giro del Lazio
5th Overall Giro d'Italia
7th Tre Valli Varesine

1966
1st Maggiora Criterium
2nd Overall Cronostaffetta
6th Overall Giro d'Italia
8th Coppa Sabatini

1967
1st National Road Championships
1st Overall Cronostaffetta

1st Stage 1c

1st Maggiora Criterium
1st Piaggiori Criterium
2nd Overall Giro d'Italia
2nd Giro della Romagna
3rd Overall Tour de France
3rd Bergamo Criterium
4th Coppa Bernocchi
5th Pernod–Super Prestige
6th Giro dell'Appennino
9th Tre Valli Varesine

1968
1st Overall Cronostaffetta
7th Overall Giro d'Italia

1969
1st Maggiora Criterium
1st Ronde des Korrigans

1970
3rd Giro del Piemonte

1972
8th Coppa Agostoni

=== Grand Tours general classification results timeline ===
Grand Tour	1961	1962	1963	1964	1965	1966	1967	1968	1969	1970	1971	1972
Giro d'Italia	20	1	1	8	5	6	2	7	—	12	DNF	38
Tour de France	—	—	DNF	—	—	—	3	—	39	12	DNF	—
Vuelta a España	—	—	—	—	—	—	—	—	—	—	—	—

Legend
—	Did not compete
DNF	Did not finish
DSQ	Disqualified
