= Henri Rabaute =

French racing cyclist

Personal information
- Born: 26 May 1943
- Died: 11 October 2000 (aged 57)

Cycling career
- Sport: Cycling
- Role: Rider

Henri Rabaute (26 May 1943 – 11 October 2000) was a French racing cyclist. He rode in the 1970 Tour de France.
