= Jean Monteyne =

Belgian cyclist (born 1943)

Personal information
- Born: 30 July 1943 (age 83)

Cycling career
- Sport: Cycling
- Role: Rider

Jean Monteyne (born 30 July 1943) is a Belgian racing cyclist. He rode in the 1966 Tour de France.
