= Roger Milliot (cyclist) =

French cyclist

Personal information
- Born: 26 June 1943
- Died: 28 February 2010 (aged 66)

Cycling career
- Sport: Cycling
- Role: Rider

Roger Milliot (26 June 1943 – 28 February 2010) was a French racing cyclist. He rode in the 1966 Tour de France.
