= Pietro Scandelli =

Italian cyclist (1941–2020)

Personal information
- Born: 16 October 1941 Crema, Italy
- Died: 5 October 2020 (aged 78) Crema, Italy

Cycling career
- Sport: Cycling
- Role: Rider

Pietro Scandelli (16 October 1941 – 5 October 2020) was an Italian racing cyclist. He won stage 21 of the 1966 Giro d'Italia.
