= José Samyn =

French cyclist (1946–1969)

- Samyn in 1968

Personal information
- Full name: José Samyn
- Born: 11 May 1946 Quiévrain, Belgium
- Died: 28 August 1969 (aged 23) Zingem, Belgium

Cycling career
- Sport: Cycling
- Discipline: Road
- Role: Rider

Professional teams
- 1967-1968: Pelforth–Sauvage–Lejeune
- 1969: Bic

Major wins
- 1 stage Tour de France (1967); Tour de Picardie (1969)

José Samyn (11 May 1946 – 28 August 1969) was a French professional road bicycle racer who died during a race in Zingem, Belgium.

Samyn was born in Quiévrain, Belgium to a Belgian mother and French father, he took French nationality in 1964 . As an amateur, he won the 1965 French Military Cycling Championship. In 1967, he won a stage of the Tour de France. The following year, however, a dope test carried out during the Tour proved positive. Samyn was expelled from the race, suspended for one month and fined.

He was the first winner of the GP Fayt-le-Franc, and after his death at Zingem the race was renamed Le Samyn (or Memorial Samyn) in his honor.

== Major results ==
1967
Grand Prix de Denain
Solesmes
Tour de France:

Winner stage 11

1968
Circuit du Port de Dunkerque
GP Fayt-le-Franc
Wingene
1969
Tour de Picardie
