= Willy Van Neste =

Belgian cyclist

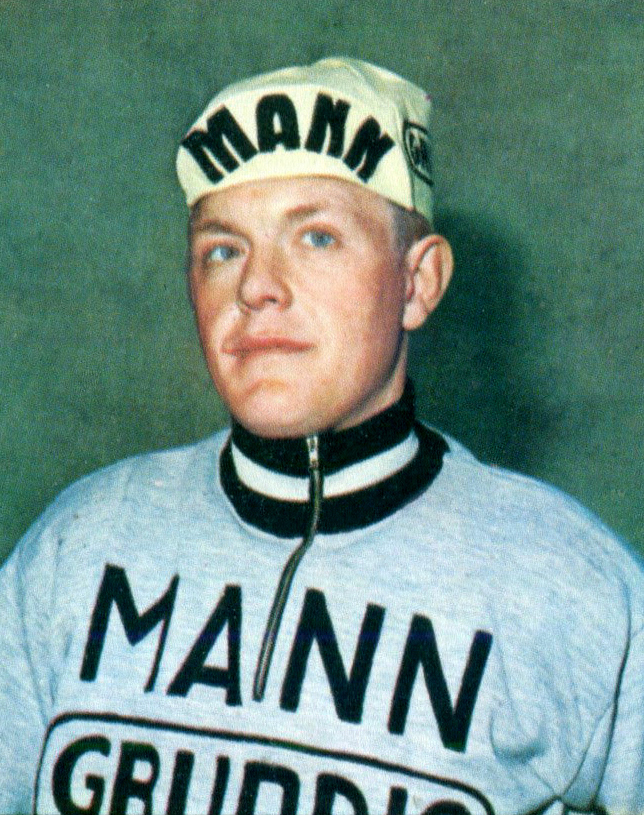
- Van Neste circa 1968

Personal information
- Born: 10 March 1944 (age 82) Zwevezele, Belgium

Cycling career
- Sport: Cycling
- Current team: Retired
- Discipline: Road
- Role: Rider

Major wins
- Zürich-Metzgete

Willy Van Neste (born 10 March 1944) is a retired Belgian professional road bicycle racer who competed as a professional from 1966 to 1976. He participated in seven editions of the Tour de France, where he won a stage in the 1967 Tour de France and wore the yellow jersey as leader of the general classification for the following day. Other career highlights include winning the Four Days of Dunkirk in 1970, the Züri-Metzgete in 1972 and Grand Prix de Fourmies in 1967. He also finished second in the 1968 Gent–Wevelgem and the 1970 Amstel Gold Race.

== Major results ==
1965
Tour de Namur
1966
Flèche Ardennaise
Wavre – Liège
1967
Arras
Lokeren Criterium
Wieze
Zwevezele
Tour de France:

Winner stage 2
Wearing yellow jersey for one day

GP Fourmies
1969
Ronse – Doornik – Ronse
1970
Zwevezele
Four days of Dunkerque
1971
De Panne
Kortrijk
Westrozebeke
1972
Zürich-Metzgete
