= Ginés García Perán =

Spanish bicycle racer (born 1941)

Ginés García
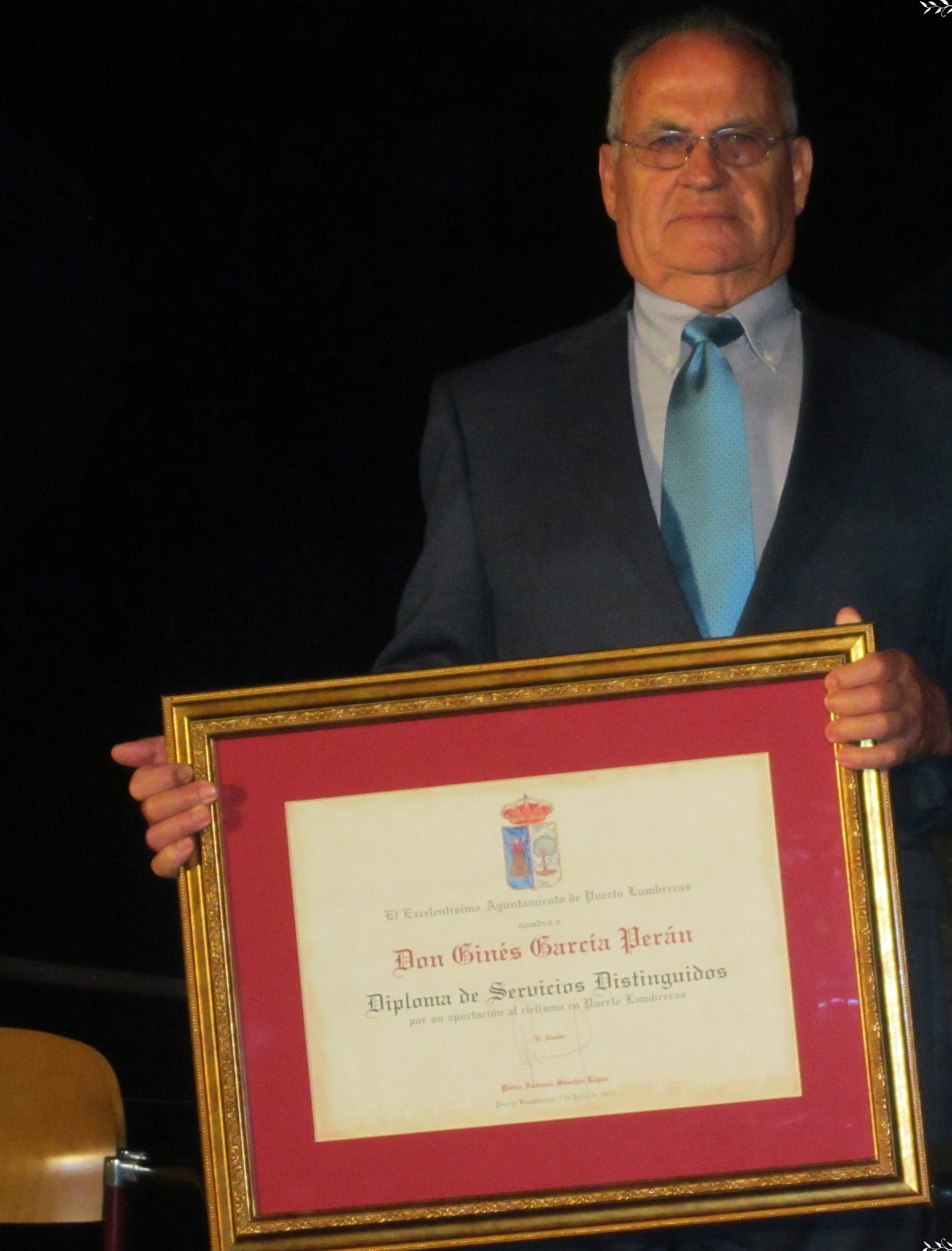
- Ginés García in 2012

Personal information
- Full name: Ginés García Perán
- Born: 18 February 1941 (age 85) El Esparragal, Puerto Lumbreras, Spain

Cycling career
- Sport: Cycling
- Current team: Retired
- Discipline: Road
- Role: Rider

Professional teams
- 1962: Cerveza El Águila
- 1963: Flandria–Faema
- 1964: Licor 43
- 1964–1965: Margnat–Paloma–Dunlop
- 1966–1968: Fagor

Ginés García Perán (born 28 February 1941) is a Spanish former professional road cyclist.

== Major results ==
1962
1st Clásica a los Puertos de Guadarrama
3rd Overall Volta a Catalunya
1963
1st Stage 10 Tour de l'Avenir
1964
3rd Overall Tour de l'Avenir
1965
4th Overall Volta a Catalunya
8th Overall Critérium du Dauphiné Libéré
1966
2nd Prueba Villafranca de Ordizia
3rd National Road Race Championships
5th Overall Volta a Catalunya
1967
1st Overall Vuelta a los Valles Mineros

1st Stage 2

2nd GP Navarra
2nd National Hill Climb Championships
3rd National Road Race Championships
4th Overall Volta a Catalunya
5th Grand Prix du Midi Libre
