= Michel Grain =

French cyclist

Personal information
- Born: 6 October 1942 (age 84)

Cycling career
- Sport: Cycling
- Role: Rider

Michel Grain (born 6 October 1942) is a French racing cyclist. He rode in the 1970 Tour de France.
