= Noël Van Clooster =

Belgian cyclist

Personal information
- Born: 2 December 1943 Torhout, West Flanders, Belgium
- Died: 12 July 2022 (aged 78) Tielt, West Flanders, Belgium

Cycling career
- Sport: Cycling
- Discipline: Road
- Role: Rider

Professional teams
- 1965: Flandria–Romeo
- 1965: Lamot–Libertas
- 1966: Dr. Mann–Grundig
- 1967–1969: Flandria–De Clerck
- 1970–1971: Hertekamp–Magniflex
- 1972: Watney–Avia
- 1973: IJsboerke–Bertin
- 1974–1975: MIC–Ludo–de Gribaldy

Noël Van Clooster (2 December 1943 – 12 July 2022) was a Belgian former racing cyclist. He rode in four editions of the Tour de France, as well as two editions of the Giro d'Italia and one Vuelta a España.

== Major results ==
1965
1st Kattekoers
1st Stage 2a Tour du Nord
3rd Grand Prix d'Isbergues
1966
2nd Gent–Wevelgem
8th Rund um den Henninger Turm
1967
1st De Kustpijl
1968
5th Overall Vuelta a Andalucía

1st Stage 4

1969
1st Omloop van het Houtland Lichtervelde
1970
1st Kampioenschap van Vlaanderen
1st Torhout
2nd GP Union Dortmund
2nd GP Flandria
1971
1st Brussels–Ingooigem
4th Rund um den Henninger Turm
4th Kuurne–Brussels–Kuurne
9th Overall Tirreno–Adriatico
1972
1st Omloop van Oost-Vlaanderen
1st De Kustpijl
2nd Overall Tour d'Indre-et-Loire
2nd Kuurne–Brussels–Kuurne
5th Overall Tirreno–Adriatico
1974
4th Bordeaux–Paris
