= List of teams and cyclists in the 1969 Vuelta a España =

For the 1969 Vuelta a España, the field consisted of 100 riders; 68 finished the race.

== By rider ==
Legend
No.	Starting number worn by the rider during the Vuelta
Pos.	Position in the general classification
Time	Deficit to the winner of the general classification
DNF	Denotes a rider who did not finish

No.	Name	Nationality	Team	Pos.	Time	Ref
1	Raymond Steegmans	Belgium	Goldor	44	+ 33' 01"	
2	Etienne Sonck	Belgium	Goldor	DNF	—	
3	Jan Brusselmans	Belgium	Goldor	57	+ 48' 27"	
4	Willy Maes	Belgium	Goldor	DNF	—	
5	Willy Moonen	Belgium	Goldor	DNF	—	
6	Carmine Preziosi	Italy	Goldor	56	+ 44' 12"	
7	Alfons Scheys	Belgium	Goldor	DNF	—	
8	Frans Van De Walle	Belgium	Goldor	DNF	—	
9	Herman Vrancken	Belgium	Goldor	DNF	—	
10	Edouard Weckx	Belgium	Goldor	53	+ 40' 51"	
11	Salvador Canet García	Spain	Pepsi-Cola	11	+ 8' 05"	
12	Demetrio Martí Luján	Spain	Pepsi-Cola	58	+ 49' 28"	
13	Ramón Sáez Marzo	Spain	Pepsi-Cola	19	+ 13' 46"	
14	Juan Daniel Perera Ruiz	Spain	Pepsi-Cola	DNF	—	
15	Ángel Ibáñez	Spain	Pepsi-Cola	50	+ 39' 51"	
16	José Manuel Lasa	Spain	Pepsi-Cola	4	+ 5' 10"	
17	Miguel María Lasa	Spain	Pepsi-Cola	21	+ 14' 06"	
18	Jorge Mariné	Spain	Pepsi-Cola	17	+ 12' 25"	
19	José Florencio Tutusaus	Spain	Pepsi-Cola	55	+ 43' 37"	
20	José Albelda Tormo	Spain	Pepsi-Cola	31	+ 22' 08"	
21	Roger Pingeon	France	Peugeot	1	73h 18' 45"	
22	Henri Rabaute	France	Peugeot	DNF	—	
23	René Pinazzo	France	Peugeot	DNF	—	
24	Jozef Schoeters	Belgium	Peugeot	DNF	—	
25	Willy Monty	Belgium	Peugeot	68	+ 1h 02' 48"	
26	Jean-Claude Daunat	France	Peugeot	DNF	—	
27	André Desvages	France	Peugeot	DNF	—	
28	René Grenier	France	Peugeot	DNF	—	
29	René Pingeon	France	Peugeot	DNF	—	
30	Désiré Letort	France	Peugeot	DNF	—	
31	Claudio Michelotto	Italy	Max Meyer	43	+ 32' 18"	
32	Guido Neri	Italy	Max Meyer	37	+ 27' 37"	
33	Luigi Sgarbozza	Italy	Max Meyer	52	+ 40' 15"	
34	Ercole Gualazzini	Italy	Max Meyer	63	+ 53' 20"	
35	Lorenzo Bosisio	Italy	Max Meyer	DNF	—	
36	Primo Mori	Italy	Max Meyer	61	+ 51' 54"	
37	Maurizio Malagutti	Italy	Max Meyer	DNF	—	
38	Pietro Tamiazzo	Italy	Max Meyer	DNF	—	
39	Felice Salina	Italy	Max Meyer	DNF	—	
40	Giuseppe Scopel	Italy	Max Meyer	47	+ 35' 29"	
41	Francisco Gabica	Spain	Fagor	16	+ 9' 48"	
42	Domingo Perurena	Spain	Fagor	23	+ 14' 41"	
43	Eusebio Vélez	Spain	Fagor	10	+ 7' 51"	
44	José Manuel López	Spain	Fagor	15	+ 9' 28"	
45	Luis Ocaña	Spain	Fagor	2	+ 1' 54"	
46	José Antonio Momeñe	Spain	Fagor	29	+ 20' 30"	
47	Ramón Mendiburu Ibarburu	Spain	Fagor	39	+ 30' 18"	
48	Luis Santamarina	Spain	Fagor	22	+ 14' 12"	
49	Mariano Díaz	Spain	Fagor	28	+ 18' 16"	
50	Juan Silloniz	Spain	Fagor	DNF	—	
51	Walter Boucquet	Belgium	Pull Over	41	+ 31' 24"	
52	Victor Nuelant	Belgium	Pull Over	42	+ 32' 17"	
53	Noël Vantyghem	Belgium	Pull Over	DNF	—	
54	Christian Callens	Belgium	Pull Over	49	+ 39' 42"	
55	Etienne Buysse	Belgium	Pull Over	DNF	—	
56	Roland Van De Rijse	Belgium	Pull Over	66	+ 1h 00' 18"	
57	Richard Bukacki	Netherlands	Pull Over	DNF	—	
58	Herman Flabat	Belgium	Pull Over	24	+ 15' 08"	
59	André Hendryckx	Belgium	Pull Over	DNF	—	
60	Willy De Geest	Belgium	Pull Over	14	+ 9' 04"	
61	Ventura Díaz	Spain	Karpy	13	+ 8' 35"	
62	Gabino Ereñozaga Lejarreta	Spain	Karpy	48	+ 38' 59"	
63	Julián Cuevas	Spain	Karpy	33	+ 24' 53"	
64	Manuel Martín Piñera	Spain	Karpy	67	+ 1h 02' 37"	
65	Javier Otaola	Spain	Karpy	DNF	—	
66	Juan María Uribezubia	Spain	Karpy	20	+ 13' 56"	
67	José Manuel Mesa Fernández	Spain	Karpy	60	+ 50' 36"	
68	José Luis Elorriaga Atela	Spain	Karpy	DNF	—	
69	Juan María Azcue Vidaurrazaga	Spain	Karpy	46	+ 34' 20"	
70	Andrés Incera Paradelo	Spain	Karpy	59	+ 49' 50"	
71	Gilbert Bellone	France	Bic	7	+ 6' 47"	
72	Rolf Wolfshohl	West Germany	Bic	6	+ 6' 11"	
73	José Pérez Francés	Spain	Bic	27	+ 16' 40"	
74	Michael Wright	Great Britain	Bic	5	+ 5' 27"	
75	Anatole Novak	France	Bic	DNF	—	
76	Serge Bolley	France	Bic	36	+ 26' 06"	
77	Jean Pinault	France	Bic	65	+ 59' 21"	
78	Luis Balagué	Spain	Bic	34	+ 25' 18"	
79	Edward Sels	Belgium	Bic	54	+ 42' 35"	
80	Johny Schleck	Luxembourg	Bic	35	+ 25' 33"	
81	Carlos Echeverría Zudaire	Spain	Kas	9	+ 7' 35"	
82	Antonio Gómez del Moral	Spain	Kas	DNF	—	
83	Gregorio San Miguel	Spain	Kas	8	+ 7' 05"	
84	Eduardo Castelló	Spain	Kas	18	+ 13' 31"	
85	Vicente López Carril	Spain	Kas	26	+ 15' 32"	
86	Andrés Gandarias	Spain	Kas	DNF	—	
87	Santiago Lazcano	Spain	Kas	40	+ 31' 15"	
88	Aurelio González Puente	Spain	Kas	25	+ 15' 23"	
89	José Antonio González	Spain	Kas	12	+ 8' 15"	
90	Nemesio Jiménez	Spain	Kas	64	+ 54' 06"	
91	Evert Dolman	Netherlands	Willem II–Gazelle	30	+ 21' 14"	
92	Marcel Maes	Belgium	Willem II–Gazelle	DNF	—	
93	Rini Wagtmans	Netherlands	Willem II–Gazelle	3	+ 5' 10"	
94	Harm Ottenbros	Netherlands	Willem II–Gazelle	38	+ 39' 09"	
95	Cees Haast	Netherlands	Willem II–Gazelle	32	+ 22' 46"	
96	Henri De Wolf	Belgium	Willem II–Gazelle	62	+ 52' 30"	
97	Henk Nijdam	Netherlands	Willem II–Gazelle	DNF	—	
98	Huub Zilverberg	Netherlands	Willem II–Gazelle	51	+ 39' 53"	
99	Jozef Timmerman	Belgium	Willem II–Gazelle	45	+ 33' 08"	
100	Jan van Katwijk	Netherlands	Willem II–Gazelle	DNF	—	
