= 1969 Vuelta a España, Stage 1a to Stage 10 =

Cycling race stages

The 1969 Vuelta a España was the 24th edition of the Vuelta a España, one of cycling's Grand Tours. The Vuelta began in Badajoz, with an individual time trial on 23 April, and Stage 10 occurred on 3 May with a stage to Barcelona. The race finished in Bilbao on 11 May.

== Stage 1a ==
23 April 1969 - Badajoz to Badajoz, 6.5 km (4.0 mi) (ITT)

Stage 1a result and General Classification after Stage 1a

Rank	Rider	Team	Time
1	Luis Ocaña (ESP)	Fagor	7' 12"
2	Antonio Gómez del Moral (ESP)	Kas–Kaskol	s.t.
3	Roger Pingeon (FRA)	Peugeot–BP–Michelin	+ 8"
4	José Manuel Lasa (ESP)	Pepsi-Cola	+ 9"
5	Claudio Michelotto (ITA)	Max Meyer	+ 12"
6	Gilbert Bellone (FRA)	Bic	s.t.
7	José Manuel López (ESP)	Fagor	+ 14"
8	José Antonio González (ESP)	Kas–Kaskol	s.t.
9	José Florencio Tutusaus (ESP)	Pepsi-Cola	+ 16"
10	Gregorio San Miguel (ESP)	Kas–Kaskol	s.t.

== Stage 1b ==
24 April 1969 - Badajoz to Badajoz, 246 km (152.9 mi)

Route:

Stage 1b result

Rank	Rider	Team	Time
1	Michael Wright (GBR)	Bic	6h 28' 23"
2	Richard Bukacki (NED)	Pull Over Centrale–Novy	+ 18"
3	Harm Ottenbros (NED)	Willem II–Gazelle	+ 33"
4	Raymond Steegmans (BEL)	Goldor	s.t.
5	Jozef Schoeters (BEL)	Peugeot–BP–Michelin	s.t.
6	Julián Cuevas (ESP)	Karpy	s.t.
7	Rini Wagtmans (NED)	Willem II–Gazelle	s.t.
8	Jan van Katwijk (NED)	Willem II–Gazelle	s.t.
9	Edward Sels (BEL)	Bic	s.t.
10	Victor Nuelant (NED)	Pull Over Centrale–Novy	s.t.

General classification after Stage 1b

Rank	Rider	Team	Time
1	Michael Wright (GBR)	Bic	6h 36' 21"
2	Luis Ocaña (ESP)	Fagor	+ 9"
3	Roger Pingeon (FRA)	Peugeot–BP–Michelin	+ 17"
4	José Manuel Lasa (ESP)	Pepsi-Cola	+ 18"
5	Gilbert Bellone (FRA)	Bic	+ 21"
6	Claudio Michelotto (ITA)	Max Meyer	s.t.
7	José Manuel López (ESP)	Fagor	+ 23"
8	José Antonio González (ESP)	Kas–Kaskol	s.t
9	Gregorio San Miguel (ESP)	Kas–Kaskol	+ 25"
10	José Florencio Tutusaus (ESP)	Pepsi-Cola	s.t.

== Stage 2 ==
25 April 1969 - Badajoz to Cáceres, 135 km (83.9 mi)

Route:

Stage 2 result

Rank	Rider	Team	Time
1	Felice Salina (ITA)	Max Meyer	3h 16' 06"
2	Raymond Steegmans (BEL)	Goldor	+ 23"
3	Richard Bukacki (NED)	Pull Over Centrale–Novy	+ 43"
4	Luigi Sgarbozza (ITA)	Max Meyer	s.t.
5	Edward Sels (BEL)	Bic	s.t.
6	Guido Neri (ITA)	Max Meyer	s.t.
7	Harm Ottenbros (NED)	Willem II–Gazelle	s.t.
8	Jan van Katwijk (NED)	Willem II–Gazelle	s.t.
9	Jozef Timmerman (BEL)	Willem II–Gazelle	s.t.
10	Evert Dolman (NED)	Willem II–Gazelle	s.t.

General classification after Stage 2

Rank	Rider	Team	Time
1	Michael Wright (GBR)	Bic	9h 53' 10"
2	Luis Ocaña (ESP)	Fagor	+ 9"
3	Roger Pingeon (FRA)	Peugeot–BP–Michelin	+ 17"
4	José Manuel Lasa (ESP)	Pepsi-Cola	+ 18"
5	Claudio Michelotto (ITA)	Max Meyer	+ 21"
6	Gilbert Bellone (FRA)	Bic	s.t.
7	Felice Salina (ITA)	Max Meyer	+ 22"
8	José Manuel López (ESP)	Fagor	+ 23"
9	José Antonio González (ESP)	Kas–Kaskol	s.t.
10	Gregorio San Miguel (ESP)	Kas–Kaskol	+ 25"

== Stage 3 ==
26 April 1969 - Cáceres to Talavera de la Reina, 190 km (120 mi)

Route:

Stage 3 result

Rank	Rider	Team	Time
1	Luigi Sgarbozza (ITA)	Max Meyer	4h 23' 38"
2	Carlos Echeverría Zudaire (ESP)	Kas–Kaskol	+ 20"
3	Willy De Geest (BEL)	Pull Over Centrale–Novy	+ 40"
4	Jorge Mariné (ESP)	Pepsi-Cola	s.t.
5	Juan Silloniz (ESP)	Fagor	s.t.
6	Claudio Michelotto (ITA)	Max Meyer	s.t.
7	Ramón Mendiburu Ibarburu (ESP)	Fagor	s.t.
8	José Pérez Francés (ESP)	Bic	s.t.
9	Willy Monty (BEL)	Peugeot–BP–Michelin	s.t.
10	Eduardo Castelló (ESP)	Kas–Kaskol	s.t.

General classification after Stage 3

Rank	Rider	Team	Time
1	Luigi Sgarbozza (ITA)	Max Meyer	14h 47' 32"
2	Michael Wright (GBR)	Bic	+ 7"
3	Carlos Echeverría Zudaire (ESP)	Kas–Kaskol	+ 14"
4	Luis Ocaña (ESP)	Fagor	+ 16"
5	Claudio Michelotto (ITA)	Max Meyer	+ 17"
6	Jorge Mariné (ESP)	Pepsi-Cola	+ 22"
7	Juan Silloniz (ESP)	Fagor	s.t.
8	Roger Pingeon (FRA)	Peugeot–BP–Michelin	+ 24"
9	José Manuel Lasa (ESP)	Pepsi-Cola	+ 25"
10	Gilbert Bellone (FRA)	Bic	+ 28"

== Stage 4 ==
27 April 1969 - Talavera de la Reina to Madrid, 124 km (77 mi)

Route:

Stage 4 result

Rank	Rider	Team	Time
1	Domingo Perurena (ESP)	Fagor	3h 13' 34"
2	Jorge Mariné (ESP)	Pepsi-Cola	+ 20"
3	Claudio Michelotto (ITA)	Max Meyer	+ 40"
4	Richard Bukacki (NED)	Pull Over Centrale–Novy	s.t.
5	Luigi Sgarbozza (ITA)	Max Meyer	s.t.
6	Raymond Steegmans (BEL)	Goldor	s.t.
7	Harm Ottenbros (NED)	Willem II–Gazelle	s.t.
8	Serge Bolley (FRA)	Bic	s.t.
9	José Manuel Lasa (ESP)	Pepsi-Cola	s.t.
10	José Manuel López (ESP)	Fagor	s.t.

General classification after Stage 4

Rank	Rider	Team	Time
1	Luigi Sgarbozza (ITA)	Max Meyer	17h 31' 46"
2	Jorge Mariné (ESP)	Pepsi-Cola	+ 2"
3	Michael Wright (GBR)	Bic	+ 7"
4	Carlos Echeverría Zudaire (ESP)	Kas–Kaskol	+ 14"
5	Luis Ocaña (ESP)	Fagor	s.t.
6	Claudio Michelotto (ITA)	Max Meyer	+ 17"
7	Juan Silloniz (ESP)	Fagor	+ 22"
8	Roger Pingeon (FRA)	Peugeot–BP–Michelin	+ 24"
9	José Manuel Lasa (ESP)	Pepsi-Cola	+ 25"
10	Gilbert Bellone (FRA)	Bic	+ 29"

== Stage 5 ==
28 April 1969 - Madrid to Alcázar de San Juan, 162 km (101 mi)

Stage 5 result

Rank	Rider	Team	Time
1	Raymond Steegmans (BEL)	Goldor	3h 26' 51"
2	Serge Bolley (FRA)	Bic	+ 20"
3	Rini Wagtmans (NED)	Willem II–Gazelle	+ 40"
4	Michael Wright (GBR)	Bic	s.t.
5	Salvador Canet García (ESP)	Pepsi-Cola	s.t.
6	José Manuel Lasa (ESP)	Pepsi-Cola	s.t.
7	Rolf Wolfshohl (FRG)	Bic	s.t.
8	Claudio Michelotto (ITA)	Max Meyer	s.t.
9	Johny Schleck (LUX)	Bic	s.t.
10	Evert Dolman (NED)	Willem II–Gazelle	s.t.

== Stage 6 ==
29 April 1969 - Alcázar de San Juan to Almansa, 231 km (144 mi)

Stage 6 result

Rank	Rider	Team	Time
1	Edward Sels (BEL)	Bic	5h 25' 27"
2	José Manuel López (ESP)	Fagor	+ 30"
3	Raymond Steegmans (BEL)	Goldor	+ 40"
4	Michael Wright (GBR)	Bic	s.t.
5	Victor Nuelant (NED)	Pull Over Centrale–Novy	s.t.
6	Evert Dolman (NED)	Willem II–Gazelle	s.t.
7	Willy De Geest (BEL)	Pull Over Centrale–Novy	s.t.
8	José Antonio Momeñe (ESP)	Fagor	s.t.
9	Harm Ottenbros (NED)	Willem II–Gazelle	s.t.
10	Johny Schleck (LUX)	Bic	s.t.

General classification after Stage 6

Rank	Rider	Team	Time
1	Raymond Steegmans (BEL)	Goldor	26h 25' 29"
2	Michael Wright (GBR)	Bic	+ 2"
3	Carlos Echeverría Zudaire (ESP)	Kas–Kaskol	+ 9"
4	Claudio Michelotto (ITA)	Max Meyer	+ 12"
5	Roger Pingeon (FRA)	Peugeot–BP–Michelin	+ 19"
6	Jorge Mariné (ESP)	Pepsi-Cola	+ 23"
7	Gilbert Bellone (FRA)	Bic	s.t.
8	José Antonio González (ESP)	Kas–Kaskol	+ 26"
9	Gregorio San Miguel (ESP)	Kas–Kaskol	+ 28"
10	Rini Wagtmans (NED)	Willem II–Gazelle	+ 32"

== Stage 7 ==
30 April 1969 - Almansa to Nules, 233 km (145 mi)

Route:

Stage 7 result

Rank	Rider	Team	Time
1	Ramón Sáez Marzo (ESP)	Pepsi-Cola	5h 40' 01"
2	Domingo Perurena (ESP)	Fagor	+ 20"
3	Manuel Martín Piñera (ESP)	Karpy	+ 38"
4	Michael Wright (GBR)	Bic	+ 40"
5	Edward Sels (BEL)	Bic	s.t.
6	Serge Bolley (FRA)	Bic	s.t.
7	Rini Wagtmans (NED)	Willem II–Gazelle	s.t.
8	Luigi Sgarbozza (ITA)	Max Meyer	s.t.
9	Rolf Wolfshohl (FRG)	Bic	s.t.
10	Jorge Mariné (ESP)	Pepsi-Cola	s.t.

General classification after Stage 7

Rank	Rider	Team	Time
1	Raymond Steegmans (BEL)	Goldor	32h 06' 10"
2	Michael Wright (GBR)	Bic	+ 2"
3	Carlos Echeverría Zudaire (ESP)	Kas–Kaskol	+ 9"
4	Claudio Michelotto (ITA)	Max Meyer	+ 12"
5	Roger Pingeon (FRA)	Peugeot–BP–Michelin	+ 19"
6	Jorge Mariné (ESP)	Pepsi-Cola	+ 23"
7	Gilbert Bellone (FRA)	Bic	s.t.
8	José Antonio González (ESP)	Kas–Kaskol	+ 26"
9	Gregorio San Miguel (ESP)	Kas–Kaskol	+ 28"
10	Rini Wagtmans (NED)	Willem II–Gazelle	+ 32"

== Stage 8 ==
1 May 1969 - Nules to Benicàssim, 199 km (124 mi)

Route:

Stage 8 result

Rank	Rider	Team	Time
1	Ramón Sáez Marzo (ESP)	Pepsi-Cola	5h 13' 52"
2	Raymond Steegmans (BEL)	Goldor	+ 20"
3	Manuel Martín Piñera (ESP)	Bic	+ 24"
4	Santiago Lazcano (ESP)	Kas–Kaskol	+ 34"
5	Rini Wagtmans (NED)	Willem II–Gazelle	+ 40"
6	Etienne Sonck (BEL)	Goldor	s.t.
7	Michael Wright (GBR)	Bic	s.t.
8	Harm Ottenbros (NED)	Willem II–Gazelle	s.t.
9	Victor Nuelant (NED)	Pull Over Centrale–Novy	s.t.
10	Roland Van De Rijse (BEL)	Pull Over Centrale–Novy	s.t.

General classification after Stage 8

Rank	Rider	Team	Time
1	Raymond Steegmans (BEL)	Goldor	37h 20' 22"
2	Ramón Sáez Marzo (ESP)	Pepsi-Cola	+ 16"
3	Michael Wright (GBR)	Bic	+ 22"
4	Carlos Echeverría Zudaire (ESP)	Kas–Kaskol	+ 29"
5	Claudio Michelotto (ITA)	Max Meyer	+ 32"
6	Roger Pingeon (FRA)	Peugeot–BP–Michelin	+ 39"
7	Jorge Mariné (ESP)	Pepsi-Cola	+ 43"
8	Gilbert Bellone (FRA)	Bic	s.t.
9	José Antonio González (ESP)	Kas–Kaskol	+ 45"
10	Gregorio San Miguel (ESP)	Kas–Kaskol	+ 47"

== Stage 9 ==
2 May 1969 - Benicàssim to Reus, 169 km (105 mi)

Route:

Stage 9 result

Rank	Rider	Team	Time
1	José Manuel López (ESP)	Fagor	3h 55' 22"
2	Ramón Sáez Marzo (ESP)	Pepsi-Cola	+ 20"
3	Julián Cuevas (ESP)	Karpy	+ 40"
4	Luigi Sgarbozza (ITA)	Max Meyer	s.t.
5	Michael Wright (GBR)	Bic	s.t.
6	Guido Neri (ITA)	Max Meyer	s.t.
7	Rini Wagtmans (NED)	Willem II–Gazelle	s.t.
8	Willy De Geest (BEL)	Pull Over Centrale–Novy	s.t.
9	Victor Nuelant (NED)	Pull Over Centrale–Novy	s.t.
10	Ercole Gualazzini (ITA)	Max Meyer	s.t.

General classification after Stage 9

Rank	Rider	Team	Time
1	Ramón Sáez Marzo (ESP)	Pepsi-Cola	41h 16' 20"
2	Raymond Steegmans (BEL)	Goldor	+ 4"
3	Michael Wright (GBR)	Bic	+ 26"
4	Carlos Echeverría Zudaire (ESP)	Kas–Kaskol	+ 33"
5	José Manuel López (ESP)	Fagor	+ 36"
6	Claudio Michelotto (ITA)	Max Meyer	s.t.
7	Roger Pingeon (FRA)	Peugeot–BP–Michelin	+ 43"
8	Jorge Mariné (ESP)	Pepsi-Cola	+ 47"
9	Gilbert Bellone (FRA)	Bic	s.t.
10	José Antonio González (ESP)	Kas–Kaskol	+ 49"

== Stage 10 ==
3 May 1969 - Reus to Barcelona, 146 km (91 mi)

Route:

Stage 10 result

Rank	Rider	Team	Time
1	Manuel Martín Piñera (ESP)	Karpy	4h 13' 51"
2	Christian Callens (BEL)	Pull Over Centrale–Novy	+ 1' 51"
3	Gabino Ereñozaga Lejarreta (ESP)	Karpy	+ 2' 25"
4	José Manuel López (ESP)	Fagor	+ 2' 31"
5	Serge Bolley (FRA)	Bic	s.t.
6	Domingo Perurena (ESP)	Fagor	s.t.
7	Raymond Steegmans (BEL)	Goldor	s.t.
8	Evert Dolman (NED)	Willem II–Gazelle	s.t.
9	Jorge Mariné (ESP)	Pepsi-Cola	s.t.
10	Johny Schleck (LUX)	Bic	s.t.

General classification after Stage 10

Rank	Rider	Team	Time
1	Ramón Sáez Marzo (ESP)	Pepsi-Cola	45h 32' 42"
2	Raymond Steegmans (BEL)	Goldor	+ 4"
3	Michael Wright (GBR)	Bic	+ 26"
4	Carlos Echeverría Zudaire (ESP)	Kas–Kaskol	+ 33"
5	José Manuel López (ESP)	Fagor	+ 36"
6	Claudio Michelotto (ITA)	Max Meyer	s.t.
7	Roger Pingeon (FRA)	Peugeot–BP–Michelin	+ 43"
8	Jorge Mariné (ESP)	Pepsi-Cola	+ 47"
9	Gilbert Bellone (FRA)	Bic	s.t.
10	José Antonio González (ESP)	Kas–Kaskol	+ 49"
