= 1969 Vuelta a España, Stage 11 to Stage 18b =

Cycling race stages

The 1969 Vuelta a España was the 24th edition of the Vuelta a España, one of cycling's Grand Tours. The Vuelta began in Badajoz, with an individual time trial on 23 April, and Stage 11 occurred on 4 May with a stage from Barcelona. The race finished in Bilbao on 11 May.

== Stage 11 ==
4 May 1969 - Barcelona to Sant Feliu de Guíxols, 118 km (73.3 mi)

Route:

Stage 11 result

Rank	Rider	Team	Time
1	Nemesio Jiménez (ESP)	Kas–Kaskol	2h 44' 50"
2	Luis Santamarina (ESP)	Fagor	+ 21"
3	José Manuel Lasa (ESP)	Pepsi-Cola	+ 42"
4	Anatole Novak (FRA)	Bic	s.t.
5	José Antonio Momeñe (ESP)	Fagor	s.t.
6	Evert Dolman (NED)	Willem II–Gazelle	s.t.
7	Pietro Tamiazzo (ITA)	Max Meyer	+ 1' 04"
8	Domingo Perurena (ESP)	Fagor	+ 1' 06"
9	Ramón Sáez Marzo (ESP)	Pepsi-Cola	s.t.
10	Jan van Katwijk (NED)	Willem II–Gazelle	s.t.

General classification after Stage 11

Rank	Rider	Team	Time
1	Ramón Sáez Marzo (ESP)	Pepsi-Cola	48h 18' 38"
2	Raymond Steegmans (BEL)	Goldor	+ 4"
3	Michael Wright (GBR)	Bic	+ 26"
4	Carlos Echeverría Zudaire (ESP)	Kas–Kaskol	+ 33"
5	José Manuel López (ESP)	Fagor	+ 36"
6	Claudio Michelotto (ITA)	Max Meyer	s.t.
7	Roger Pingeon (FRA)	Peugeot–BP–Michelin	+ 43"
8	José Manuel Lasa (ESP)	Pepsi-Cola	+ 46"
9	Evert Dolman (NED)	Willem II–Gazelle	+ 47"
10	Jorge Mariné (ESP)	Pepsi-Cola	s.t.

== Stage 12 ==
5 May 1969 - Sant Feliu de Guíxols to Moià, 151 km (93.8 mi)

Stage 12 result

Rank	Rider	Team	Time
1	Roger Pingeon (FRA)	Peugeot–BP–Michelin	4h 10' 37"
2	Michael Wright (GBR)	Bic	+ 2' 49"
3	Gregorio San Miguel (ESP)	Kas–Kaskol	+ 3' 10"
4	Willy De Geest (BEL)	Pull Over Centrale–Novy	+ 3' 14"
5	José Antonio González (ESP)	Kas–Kaskol	s.t.
6	José Manuel Lasa (ESP)	Pepsi-Cola	s.t.
7	Rini Wagtmans (NED)	Willem II–Gazelle	s.t.
8	Gilbert Bellone (FRA)	Bic	s.t.
9	Salvador Canet García (ESP)	Pepsi-Cola	s.t.
10	Rolf Wolfshohl (FRG)	Bic	s.t.

== Stage 13 ==
6 May 1969 - Moià to Barbastro, 229 km (142 mi)

Stage 13 result

Rank	Rider	Team	Time
1	Michael Wright (GBR)	Bic	6h 34' 10"
2	Domingo Perurena (ESP)	Fagor	+ 20"
3	Gregorio San Miguel (ESP)	Kas–Kaskol	+ 44"
4	Raymond Steegmans (BEL)	Goldor	s.t.
5	Serge Bolley (FRA)	Bic	s.t.
6	José Pérez Francés (ESP)	Bic	s.t.
7	José Antonio Momeñe (ESP)	Fagor	+ 46"
8	Roger Pingeon (FRA)	Peugeot–BP–Michelin	s.t.
9	Giuseppe Scopel (ITA)	Max Meyer	s.t.
10	Evert Dolman (NED)	Willem II–Gazelle	s.t.

General classification after Stage 13

Rank	Rider	Team	Time
1	Roger Pingeon (FRA)	Peugeot–BP–Michelin	59h 04' 54"
2	Michael Wright (GBR)	Bic	+ 1' 46"
3	Gregorio San Miguel (ESP)	Kas–Kaskol	+ 3' 16"
4	José Manuel Lasa (ESP)	Pepsi-Cola	+ 3' 17"
5	Gilbert Bellone (FRA)	Bic	+ 3' 18"
6	José Antonio González (ESP)	Kas–Kaskol	+ 3' 20"
7	Rini Wagtmans (NED)	Willem II–Gazelle	+ 3' 20"
8	Rolf Wolfshohl (FRG)	Bic	+ 3' 41"
9	Carlos Echeverría Zudaire (ESP)	Kas–Kaskol	+ 3' 46"
10	Ventura Díaz (ESP)	Karpy	+ 4' 01"

== Stage 14a ==
7 May 1969 - Barbastro to Zaragoza, 125 km (78 mi)

Route:

Stage 14a result

Rank	Rider	Team	Time
1	Raymond Steegmans (BEL)	Goldor	3h 20' 56"
2	Harm Ottenbros (NED)	Willem II–Gazelle	+ 18"
3	Ramón Sáez Marzo (ESP)	Pepsi-Cola	+ 33"
4	Michael Wright (GBR)	Bic	s.t.
5	Rini Wagtmans (NED)	Willem II–Gazelle	s.t.
6	Andrés Incera Paradelo (ESP)	Karpy	s.t.
7	Rolf Wolfshohl (FRG)	Bic	s.t.
8	Roger Pingeon (FRA)	Peugeot–BP–Michelin	s.t.
9	Evert Dolman (NED)	Willem II–Gazelle	s.t.
10	Juan María Uribezubia (ESP)	Karpy	s.t.

== Stage 14b ==
7 May 1969 - Zaragoza to Zaragoza, 4 km (2.5 mi) (ITT)

Stage 14b result

Rank	Rider	Team	Time
1	Roger Pingeon (FRA)	Peugeot–BP–Michelin	4' 55"
2	Luis Ocaña (ESP)	Fagor	+ 6"
3	Domingo Perurena (ESP)	Fagor	+ 13"
4	Gilbert Bellone (FRA)	Bic	s.t.
5	José Manuel López (ESP)	Fagor	+ 14"
6	Michael Wright (GBR)	Bic	s.t.
7	Rini Wagtmans (NED)	Willem II–Gazelle	+ 17"
8	José Manuel Lasa (ESP)	Pepsi-Cola	+ 19"
9	Eusebio Vélez (ESP)	Fagor	s.t.
10	José Antonio González (ESP)	Kas–Kaskol	s.t.

General classification after Stage 14b

Rank	Rider	Team	Time
1	Roger Pingeon (FRA)	Peugeot–BP–Michelin	62h 31' 16"
2	Michael Wright (GBR)	Bic	+ 2' 00"
3	Gilbert Bellone (FRA)	Bic	+ 3' 31"
4	José Manuel Lasa (ESP)	Pepsi-Cola	+ 3' 36"
5	Rini Wagtmans (NED)	Willem II–Gazelle	+ 3' 44"
6	Rolf Wolfshohl (FRG)	Bic	+ 4' 01"
7	Salvador Canet García (ESP)	Pepsi-Cola	+ 4' 02"
8	Carlos Echeverría Zudaire (ESP)	Kas–Kaskol	+ 4' 12"
9	Ventura Díaz (ESP)	Karpy	+ 4' 20"
10	Luis Ocaña (ESP)	Fagor	+ 5' 02"

== Stage 15 ==
8 May 1969 - Zaragoza to Pamplona, 176 km (109 mi)

Route:

Stage 15 result

Rank	Rider	Team	Time
1	Mariano Díaz (ESP)	Fagor	4h 33' 14"
2	José Manuel Mesa Fernández (ESP)	Karpy	+ 2' 46"
3	Raymond Steegmans (BEL)	Goldor	+ 3' 39"
4	Edward Sels (BEL)	Bic	s.t.
5	Domingo Perurena (ESP)	Fagor	s.t.
6	Ercole Gualazzini (ITA)	Max Meyer	s.t.
7	José Manuel López (ESP)	Fagor	s.t.
8	José Antonio Momeñe (ESP)	Fagor	s.t.
9	Guido Neri (ITA)	Max Meyer	s.t.
10	Rini Wagtmans (NED)	Willem II–Gazelle	s.t.

General classification after Stage 15

Rank	Rider	Team	Time
1	Roger Pingeon (FRA)	Peugeot–BP–Michelin	67h 08' 09"
2	Michael Wright (GBR)	Bic	+ 2' 00"
3	Gilbert Bellone (FRA)	Bic	+ 3' 31"
4	José Manuel Lasa (ESP)	Pepsi-Cola	+ 3' 36"
5	Rini Wagtmans (NED)	Willem II–Gazelle	+ 3' 44"
6	Rolf Wolfshohl (FRG)	Bic	+ 4' 01"
7	Salvador Canet García (ESP)	Pepsi-Cola	+ 4' 02"
8	Carlos Echeverría Zudaire (ESP)	Kas–Kaskol	+ 4' 12"
9	Ventura Díaz (ESP)	Karpy	+ 4' 20"
10	Luis Ocaña (ESP)	Fagor	+ 5' 02"

== Stage 16 ==
9 May 1969 - Irun to San Sebastián, 25 km (16 mi) (ITT)

Route:

Stage 16 result

Rank	Rider	Team	Time
1	Luis Ocaña (ESP)	Fagor	36' 05"
2	Roger Pingeon (FRA)	Peugeot–BP–Michelin	+ 34"
3	Domingo Perurena (ESP)	Fagor	+ 1' 25"
4	Eusebio Vélez (ESP)	Fagor	+ 1' 29"
5	José Manuel Lasa (ESP)	Pepsi-Cola	+ 1' 37"
6	José Antonio González (ESP)	Kas–Kaskol	+ 1' 42"
7	Francisco Gabica (ESP)	Fagor	+ 1' 45"
8	José Manuel López (ESP)	Fagor	+ 1' 50"
9	Salvador Canet García (ESP)	Pepsi-Cola	+ 1' 53"
10	Carlos Echeverría Zudaire (ESP)	Kas–Kaskol	+ 2' 00"

General classification after Stage 16

Rank	Rider	Team	Time
1	Roger Pingeon (FRA)	Peugeot–BP–Michelin	67h 44' 48"
2	Luis Ocaña (ESP)	Fagor	+ 3' 48"
3	Michael Wright (GBR)	Bic	+ 4' 26"
4	José Manuel Lasa (ESP)	Pepsi-Cola	s.t.
5	Gilbert Bellone (FRA)	Bic	+ 5' 02"
6	Rini Wagtmans (NED)	Willem II–Gazelle	+ 5' 13"
7	Salvador Canet García (ESP)	Pepsi-Cola	+ 5' 21"
8	Carlos Echeverría Zudaire (ESP)	Kas–Kaskol	+ 5' 38"
9	Rolf Wolfshohl (FRG)	Bic	+ 6' 16"
10	Willy De Geest (BEL)	Pull Over Centrale–Novy	+ 6' 46"

== Stage 17 ==
10 May 1969 - San Sebastián to Vitoria, 129 km (80 mi)

Route:

Stage 17 result

Rank	Rider	Team	Time
1	Gregorio San Miguel (ESP)	Kas–Kaskol	3h 09' 15"
2	Rolf Wolfshohl (FRG)	Bic	+ 27"
3	Vicente López Carril (ESP)	Kas–Kaskol	+ 38"
4	Juan María Uribezubia (ESP)	Karpy	+ 47"
5	Michael Wright (GBR)	Bic	+ 48"
6	Rini Wagtmans (NED)	Willem II–Gazelle	s.t.
7	Eusebio Vélez (ESP)	Fagor	s.t.
8	José Manuel Lasa (ESP)	Pepsi-Cola	s.t.
9	José Pérez Francés (ESP)	Bic	s.t.
10	Willy De Geest (BEL)	Pull Over Centrale–Novy	s.t.

General classification after Stage 17

Rank	Rider	Team	Time
1	Roger Pingeon (FRA)	Peugeot–BP–Michelin	70h 54' 51"
2	Luis Ocaña (ESP)	Fagor	+ 3' 48"
3	Michael Wright (GBR)	Bic	+ 4' 26"
4	José Manuel Lasa (ESP)	Pepsi-Cola	+ 4' 39"
5	Gilbert Bellone (FRA)	Bic	+ 5' 02"
6	Rini Wagtmans (NED)	Willem II–Gazelle	+ 5' 13"
7	Carlos Echeverría Zudaire (ESP)	Kas–Kaskol	+ 5' 38"
8	Rolf Wolfshohl (FRG)	Bic	+ 5' 55"
9	Salvador Canet García (ESP)	Pepsi-Cola	+ 6' 18"
10	Willy De Geest (BEL)	Pull Over Centrale–Novy	+ 6' 46"

== Stage 18a ==
11 May 1969 - Vitoria to Llodio, 76 km (47 mi)

Route:

Stage 18a result

Rank	Rider	Team	Time
1	Ercole Gualazzini (ITA)	Max Meyer	1h 39' 48"
2	Evert Dolman (NED)	Willem II–Gazelle	+ 10"
3	Raymond Steegmans (BEL)	Goldor	+ 1' 49"
4	Ramón Sáez Marzo (ESP)	Pepsi-Cola	s.t.
5	Julián Cuevas (ESP)	Karpy	s.t.
6	Luigi Sgarbozza (ITA)	Max Meyer	s.t.
7	Rini Wagtmans (NED)	Willem II–Gazelle	s.t.
8	Harm Ottenbros (NED)	Willem II–Gazelle	s.t.
9	Michael Wright (GBR)	Bic	s.t.
10	Andrés Incera Paradelo (ESP)	Karpy	s.t.

== Stage 18b ==
11 May 1969 - Llodio to Bilbao, 29 km (18 mi) (ITT)

Route:

Stage 18b result

Rank	Rider	Team	Time
1	Luis Ocaña (ESP)	Fagor	40' 23"
2	Luis Santamarina (ESP)	Fagor	+ 1' 15"
3	José Antonio González (ESP)	Kas–Kaskol	+ 1' 35"
4	Mariano Díaz (ESP)	Fagor	+ 1' 51"
5	Rini Wagtmans (NED)	Willem II–Gazelle	s.t.
6	Roger Pingeon (FRA)	Peugeot–BP–Michelin	+ 1' 54"
7	José Antonio Momeñe (ESP)	Fagor	+ 2' 09"
8	Rolf Wolfshohl (FRG)	Bic	+ 2' 10"
9	Francisco Gabica (ESP)	Fagor	+ 2' 16"
10	José Manuel López (ESP)	Fagor	+ 2' 17"

General classification after Stage 18b

Rank	Rider	Team	Time
1	Roger Pingeon (FRA)	Peugeot–BP–Michelin	73h 18' 45"
2	Luis Ocaña (ESP)	Fagor	+ 1' 54"
3	Rini Wagtmans (NED)	Willem II–Gazelle	+ 5' 10"
4	José Manuel Lasa (ESP)	Pepsi-Cola	s.t.
5	Michael Wright (GBR)	Bic	+ 5' 27"
6	Rolf Wolfshohl (FRG)	Bic	+ 6' 11"
7	Gilbert Bellone (FRA)	Bic	+ 6' 47"
8	Gregorio San Miguel (ESP)	Kas–Kaskol	+ 7' 05"
9	Carlos Echeverría Zudaire (ESP)	Kas–Kaskol	+ 7' 35"
10	Eusebio Vélez (ESP)	Fagor	+ 7' 51"
