= Points classification in the Vuelta a España =

Secondary classification in the Spanish cycling grand tour

Green Jersey
- Sport: Road Cycling
- Competition: Vuelta a España
- Awarded for: Winner of the points classification
- Local name: Maillot verde

History
- First award: 1945
- Editions: 72 (as of 2025)
- First winner: Delio Rodríguez (ESP)
- Most wins: Seán Kelly (IRL); Laurent Jalabert (FRA); Alejandro Valverde (ESP) (4 wins each)
- Most recent: Wout van Aert (BEL)

The points classification in the Vuelta a España is a secondary classification in the Vuelta a España, in which the cyclists are ranked in a points classification, based on the finish of each rider every stage.

== History ==
For the first time, a points classification was calculated in 1945, sponsored by Pirelli. It was calculated as follows:

- The winner of a stage received 100 points, the second 99, and so on. If cyclists arrived in a group that was given the same time, they all received the same number of points.
- The first five cyclists in a stage received 12 points for every minute that they arrived ahead of the number six of the stage.
- For every point scored for the mountains classification, two points were given for this points classification.
- On intermediate sprints, points could be won: 8 for the winner, 6 for the second, 4 and 2 for the next.

Although the sponsor said that the classification was a great success, it did not return the next edition.

The next time that a points classification was calculated, was in 1955. Then it used the method of adding the stage ranks, in the same way as the points classification in the Tour de France did then; just like in the Tour de France, the leader of the points classification (with the fewest points) wore a green jersey. In 1963, the points system changed such that from now on points were given to the first cyclists to reach the finish, and the cyclist with the most points was the leader.

Seán Kelly, Laurent Jalabert and Alejandro Valverde, with 4 titles each, share the record of victories.

== System in use up to 2020 ==
Type	1st	2nd	3rd	4th	5th	6th	7th	8th	9th	10th	11th	12th	13th	14th	15th
Stage finish	25	20	16	14	12	10	9	8	7	6	5	4	3	2	1
Intermediate sprint	4	3	2												

The Vuelta used to award an equal number of points on all stages for stage finishes. Except for time trials, stages also had one or more intermediate sprints offering points. This system paired with the high number of summit finishes at the Vuelta means there is a correlation between the overall classification and the points jersey. A good example from 2012, when sprinter John Degenkolb won five stages but only finished fourth in the points competition with Alejandro Valverde well ahead.

== Current system ==
In 2021, the Vuelta switched to a system that awarded more points for finishes of flat stages. This is more in keeping with how the Tour de France and Giro d'Italia point classifications work.

All stages, other than time trial stages, have just one intermediate sprint.

Type	1st	2nd	3rd	4th	5th	6th	7th	8th	9th	10th	11th	12th	13th	14th	15th
Stage finish (Flat stage)	50	30	20	18	16	14	12	10	8	7	6	5	4	3	2
Stage finish (Medium Mountain stage)	30	25	22	19	17	15	13	11	9	7	6	5	4	3	2
Stage finish (Hard Mountain stage and Time Trials)	20	17	15	13	11	10	9	8	7	6	5	4	3	2	1
Intermediate sprint	20	17	15	13	10										

Rules

== Winners of the points classification by year ==
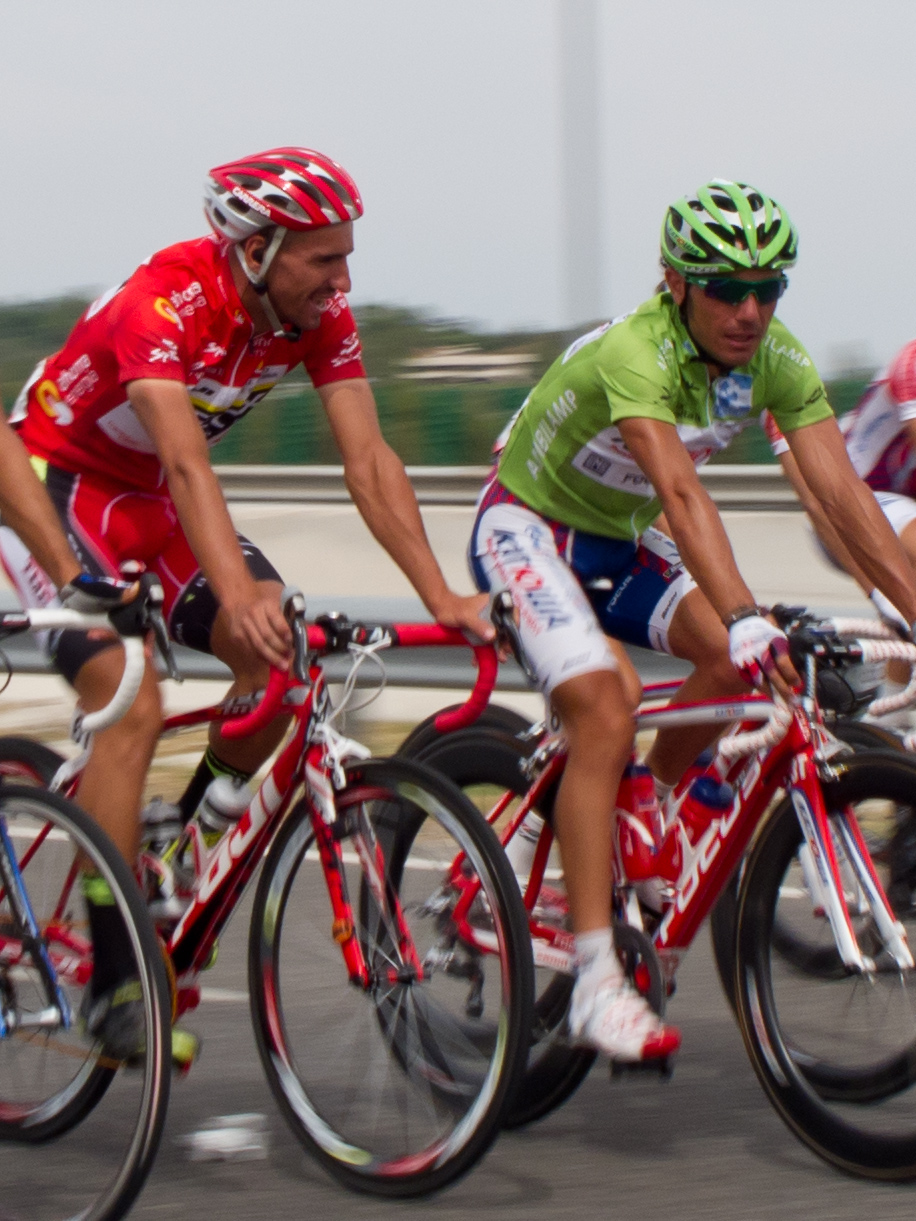
Joaquim Rodríguez (right) wearing the classification leader's jersey at the 2011 Vuelta a España

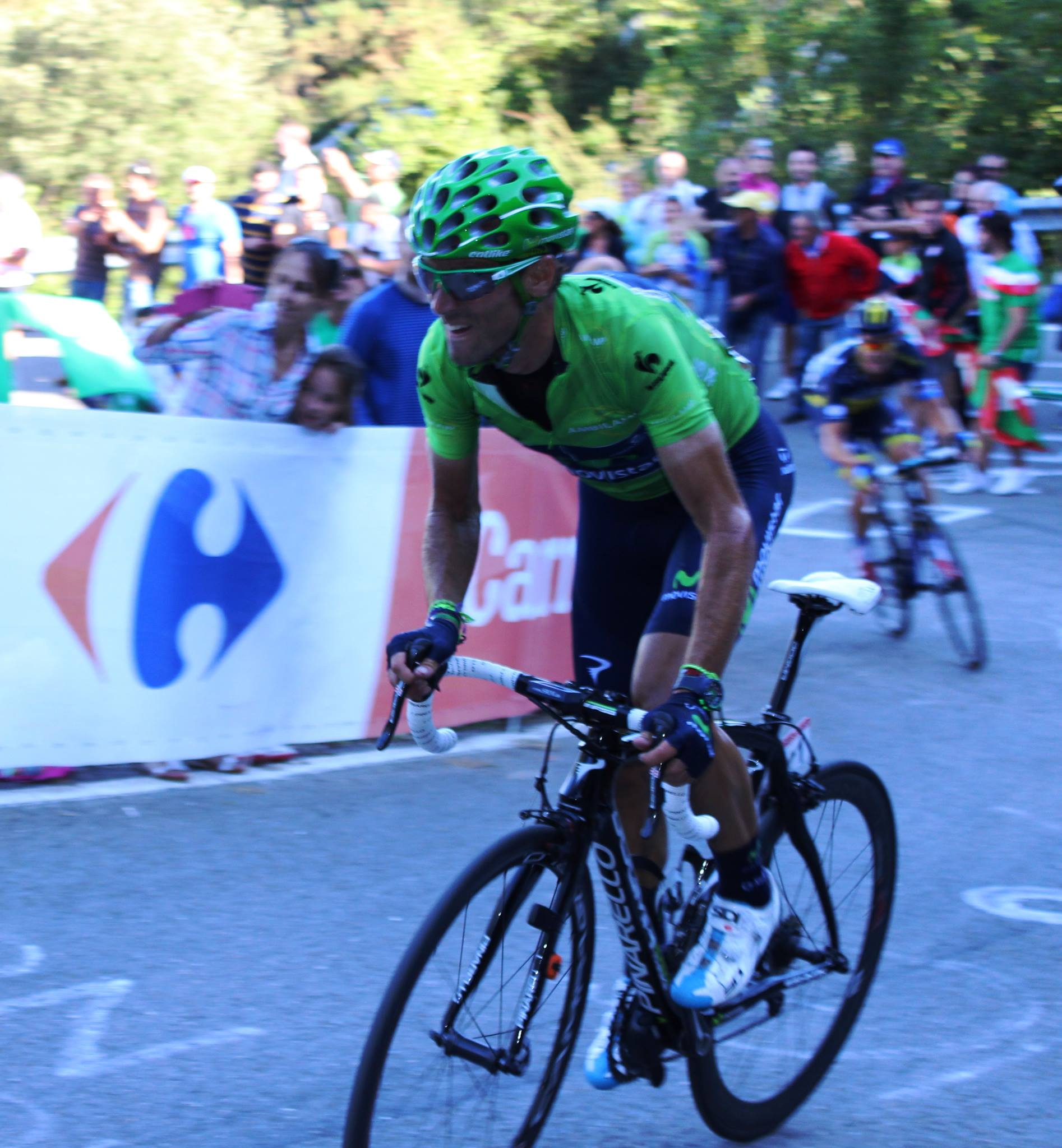
Eventual classification winner Alejandro Valverde in the green jersey at the 2013 Vuelta a España

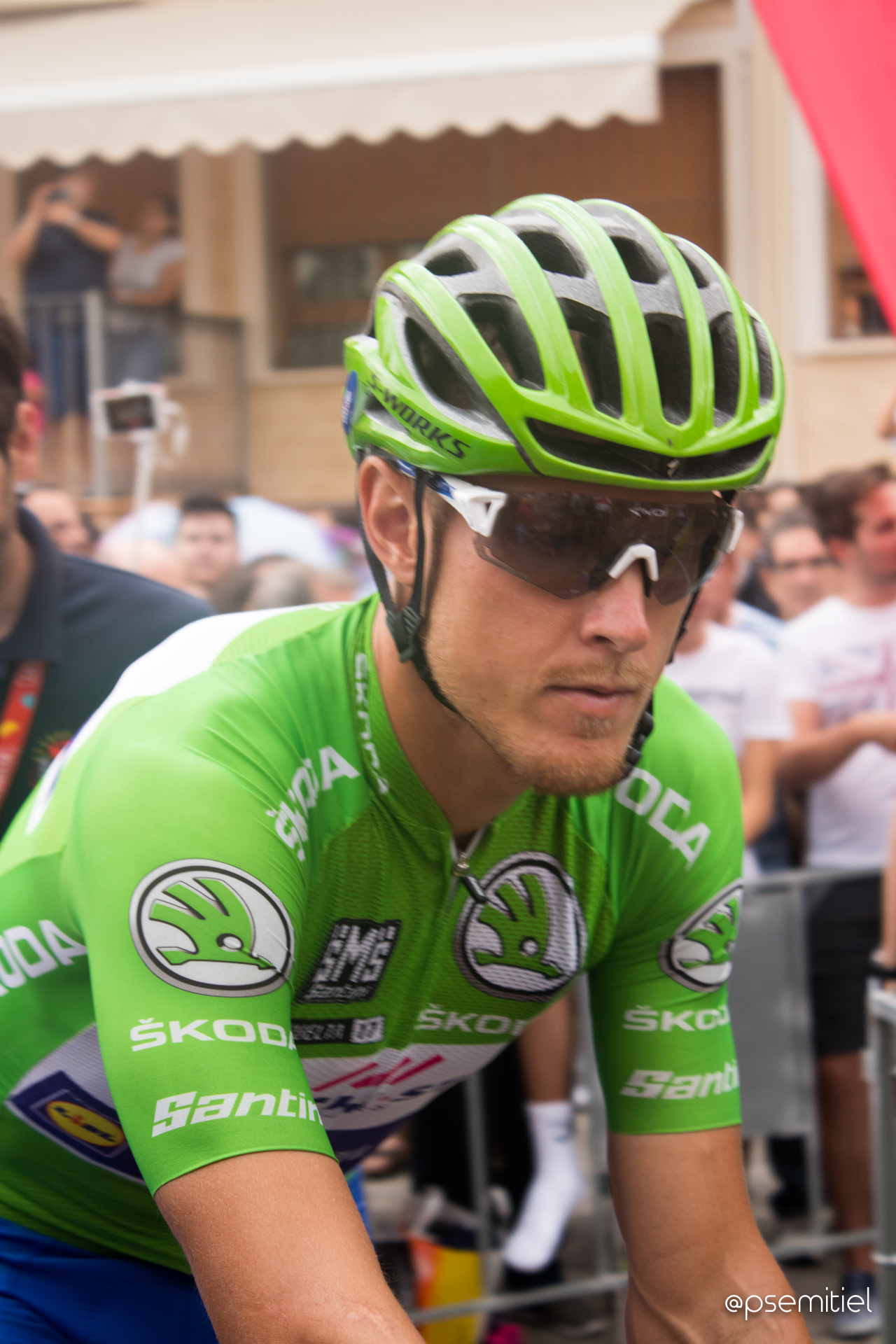
Matteo Trentin in the green jersey at the 2017 Vuelta a España

Year	Winner	Points	Second place	Points	Third place	Points	Ref(s)
1945	Delio Rodríguez (ESP)	2347	João Rebelo (POR)	2021	Julián Berrendero (ESP)	1967	
1946–1948: No points classification
1949: Race not held
1950: No points classification
1951–1954: Race not held
1955	Fiorenzo Magni (ITA)	128	Gabriel Company Bauza (ESP)	161	Jesús Loroño (ESP)	177	
1956	Rik Van Steenbergen (BEL)	98	Gilbert Bauvin (FRA)	187	Angelo Conterno (ITA)	231	
1957	Vicente Iturat (ESP)	160	Gastone Nencini (ITA)	173	Federico Bahamontes (ESP)	217	
1958	Salvador Botella (ESP)	202	Rik Luyten (BEL)	264	Hilaire Couvreur (BEL)	265	
1959	Rik Van Looy (BEL)	148	Antonio Suárez (ESP)	179	Frans Van Looveren (BEL)	253	
1960	Arthur Decabooter (BEL)	189	Juan Campillo (ESP)	214	Frans De Mulder (BEL)	239	
1961	Antonio Suárez (ESP)	194	Vicente Iturat (ESP)	199	José Pérez Francés (ESP)	201	
1962	Rudi Altig (FRG)	143.5	Seamus Elliott (IRE)	256	José Pérez Francés (ESP)	281	
1963	Bas Maliepaard (NED)	130	Edgard Sorgeloos (BEL)	105	Frans Aerenhouts (BEL)	102	
1964	José Pérez Francés (ESP)	167	Arthur Decabooter (BEL)	107	Raymond Poulidor (FRA)	76	
1965	Rik Van Looy (BEL)	243	Frans Verbeeck (BEL)	195	Michel Grain (FRA)	191	
1966	Jos van der Vleuten (NED)	147	Gerben Karstens (NED)	142	Pasquale Fabbri (ITA)	105	
1967	Jan Janssen (NED)	209	Gerben Karstens (NED)	171	Ramón Sáez Marzo (ESP)	159	
1968	Jan Janssen (NED)	142	Rudi Altig (FRG)	125	Michael Wright (GBR)	122	
1969	Raymond Steegmans (BEL)	188	Michael Wright (GBR)	171	Ramón Sáez Marzo (ESP)	118	
1970	Guido Reybrouck (BEL)	199.5	Jean Ronsmans (BEL)	197	Ramón Sáez Marzo (ESP)	172	
1971	Cyrille Guimard (FRA)	233	Miguel María Lasa (ESP)		Walter Godefroot (BEL)		
1972	Domingo Perurena (ESP)	224	Miguel María Lasa (ESP)	126	Ger Harings (NED)	114	
1973	Eddy Merckx (BEL)	215.5	Roger Swerts (BEL)	162	Pieter Nassen (BEL)	154	
1974	Domingo Perurena (ESP)	210	Eric Leman (BEL)	186	Miguel María Lasa (ESP)	159	
1975	Miguel María Lasa (ESP)	249.5	Agustín Tamames (ESP)	188	Domingo Perurena (ESP)	160	
1976	Dietrich Thurau (FRG)	174.5	Francisco Elorriaga (ESP)	174	Cees Priem (NED)	171	
1977	Freddy Maertens (BEL)	369	Klaus-Peter Thaler (FRG)	173	José Viejo (ESP)	131	
1978	Ferdi Van Den Haute (BEL)	218	Willy Teirlinck (BEL)	157	Bernard Hinault (FRA)	130	
1979	Fons De Wolf (BEL)	219	Noël Dejonckheere (BEL)	173	Joop Zoetemelk (NED)	139	
1980	Seán Kelly (IRL)	313	Guido Van Calster (BEL)	144	Jos Lammertink (NED)	116	
1981	Francisco Javier Cedena (ESP)	211	Jesús Suárez Cueva (ESP)	137	Miguel María Lasa (ESP)	134	
1982	Stefan Mutter (SUI)	172	José Luis Laguía (ESP)	133	Eddy Vanhaerens (BEL)	128	
1983	Marino Lejarreta (ESP)	188	Bernard Hinault (FRA)	162	Laurent Fignon (FRA)	149	
1984	Guido Van Calster (BEL)	204	Noël Dejonckheere (BEL)	168	Jozef Lieckens (BEL)	138	
1985	Seán Kelly (IRL)	223	Pello Ruiz Cabestany (ESP)	132	Francisco Rodríguez Maldonado (COL)	100	
1986	Seán Kelly (IRL)	253	Pello Ruiz Cabestany (ESP)	197	Álvaro Pino (ESP)	129	
1987	Alfonso Gutiérrez (ESP)	149	Luis Herrera (COL)	104	Jesús Blanco Villar (ESP)	104	
1988	Seán Kelly (IRL)	248	Mathieu Hermans (NED)	166	Benny Van Brabant (BEL)	138	
1989	Malcolm Elliott (GBR)	161	Mathieu Hermans (NED)	139	Eddy Planckaert (BEL)	139	
1990	Uwe Raab (GDR)	173	Laurent Jalabert (FRA)	96	Malcolm Elliott (GBR)	91	
1991	Uwe Raab (GER)	169	Melcior Mauri (ESP)	134	Jean-Paul van Poppel (NED)	116	
1992	Djamolidine Abdoujaparov (UZB)	157	Tony Rominger (SUI)	137	Jelle Nijdam (NED)	129	
1993	Tony Rominger (SUI)	247	Alex Zülle (SUI)	188	Laurent Jalabert (FRA)	170	
1994	Laurent Jalabert (FRA)	243	Tony Rominger (SUI)	227	Alex Zülle (SUI)	121	
1995	Laurent Jalabert (FRA)	312	Abraham Olano (ESP)	195	Marcel Wüst (GER)	178	
1996	Laurent Jalabert (FRA)	237	Nicola Minali (ITA)	163	Tom Steels (BEL)	142	
1997	Laurent Jalabert (FRA)	206	Ján Svorada (CZE)	161	Marcel Wüst (GER)	139	
1998	Fabrizio Guidi (ITA)	206	Laurent Jalabert (FRA)	158	José María Jiménez (ESP)	127	
1999	Frank Vandenbroucke (BEL)	129	Robert Hunter (RSA)	123	Igor González de Galdeano (ESP)	122	
2000	Roberto Heras (ESP)	136	Giovanni Lombardi (ITA)	123	Alessandro Petacchi (ITA)	116	
2001	José María Jiménez (ESP)	130	Erik Zabel (GER)	125	Levi Leipheimer (USA)	115	
2002	Erik Zabel (GER)	188	Alessandro Petacchi (ITA)	163	Aitor González (ESP)	151	
2003	Erik Zabel (GER)	181	Alejandro Valverde (ESP)	161	Alessandro Petacchi (ITA)	160	
2004	Erik Zabel (GER)	152	Alejandro Valverde (ESP)	144	Roberto Heras (ESP)	142	
2005	Alessandro Petacchi (ITA)	169	Denis Menchov (RUS)	142	Carlos Sastre (ESP)	124	
2006	Thor Hushovd (NOR)	199	Alexander Vinokourov (KAZ)	163	Alejandro Valverde (ESP)	147	
2007	Daniele Bennati (ITA)	147	Denis Menchov (RUS)	135	Samuel Sánchez (ESP)	127	
2008	Greg Van Avermaet (BEL)	158	Alberto Contador (ESP)	137	Alejandro Valverde (ESP)	129	
2009	André Greipel (GER)	150	Alejandro Valverde (ESP)	111	Daniele Bennati (ITA)	101	
2010	Mark Cavendish (GBR)	156	Tyler Farrar (USA)	149	Vincenzo Nibali (ITA)	119	
2011	Bauke Mollema (NED)	122	Joaquim Rodríguez (ESP)	115	Daniele Bennati (ITA)	101	
2012	Alejandro Valverde (ESP)	199	Joaquim Rodríguez (ESP)	193	Alberto Contador (ESP)	161	
2013	Alejandro Valverde (ESP)	152	Chris Horner (USA)	126	Joaquim Rodríguez (ESP)	125	
2014	John Degenkolb (GER)	169	Alejandro Valverde (ESP)	146	Alberto Contador (ESP)	145	
2015	Alejandro Valverde (ESP)	118	Joaquim Rodríguez (ESP)	116	Esteban Chaves (COL)	108	
2016	Fabio Felline (ITA)	100	Nairo Quintana (COL)	97	Alejandro Valverde (ESP)	93	
2017	Chris Froome (GBR)	158	Matteo Trentin (ITA)	156	Vincenzo Nibali (ITA)	128	
2018	Alejandro Valverde (ESP)	131	Peter Sagan (SVK)	119	Elia Viviani (ITA)	105	
2019	Primož Roglič (SLO)	155	Tadej Pogačar (SLO)	136	Sam Bennett (IRL)	134	
2020	Primož Roglič (SLO)	204	Richard Carapaz (ECU)	133	Dan Martin (IRL)	111	
2021	Fabio Jakobsen (NED)	250	Primož Roglič (SLO)	199	Magnus Cort (DEN)	161	
2022	Mads Pedersen (DEN)	409	Fred Wright (GBR)	186	Enric Mas (ESP)	138	
2023	Kaden Groves (AUS)	315	Remco Evenepoel (BEL)	236	Andreas Kron (DEN)	167	
2024	Kaden Groves (AUS)	226	Primož Roglič (SLO)	140	Max Poole (GBR)	118	
2025	Mads Pedersen (DEN)	277	Jonas Vingegaard (DEN)	197	Jasper Philipsen (BEL)	135	
2026	Wout van Aert (BEL)	326	Matthew Brennan (GBR)	273	Alessandro Romele (ITA)	216	

=== Multiple winners ===
Wins	Rider	Editions
4	Sean Kelly (IRL)	1980, 1985, 1986, 1988
4	Laurent Jalabert (FRA)	1994, 1995, 1996, 1997
4	Alejandro Valverde (ESP)	2012, 2013, 2015, 2018
3	Erik Zabel (GER)	2002, 2003, 2004
2	Rik Van Looy (BEL)	1959, 1965
2	Jan Janssen (NED)	1967, 1968
2	Uwe Raab (GER)	1990, 1991
2	Primož Roglič (SLO)	2019, 2020
2	Kaden Groves (AUS)	2023, 2024
2	Mads Pedersen (DEN)	2022, 2025

== Days in leader's jersey ==
after the end of 2026 Vuelta a España

Rider	Days	Stages
(Republic of Ireland) Sean Kelly	83	84
(France) Laurent Jalabert	78	78
(Germany) Erik Zabel	53	53
(Spain) Alejandro Valverde	42	42
(Germany) Uwe Raab	34	34
(Spain) Joaquim Rodríguez	32	32
(Denmark) Mads Pedersen	32	32
(Slovenia) Primož Roglič	31	31
(Belgium) Wout van Aert	28	28
(Norway) Thor Hushovd	25	25
(Australia) Kaden Groves	25	25
(Netherlands) Jan Janssen	24	28
(Germany) John Degenkolb	24	24
(Spain) Domingo Perurena	23	27
(Belgium) Eddy Planckaert	20	22
(Belgium) Rik Van Looy	19	20
(Belgium) Freddy Maertens	19	20
