= 1968 Vuelta a España, Stage 1a to Stage 8 =

Cycling race stages

The 1968 Vuelta a España was the 23rd edition of the Vuelta a España, one of cycling's Grand Tours. The Vuelta began in Zaragoza on 25 April, and Stage 8 occurred on 2 May with a stage to Almansa. The race finished in Bilbao on 12 May.

== Stage 1a ==
25 April 1968 - Zaragoza to Zaragoza, 130 km (80.8 mi)

Route:

Stage 1a result and General Classification after Stage 1a

| Rank | Rider | Team | Time |
|---|---|---|---|
| 1 | Jan Janssen (NED) | Pelforth–Sauvage–Lejeune | 3h 02' 00" |
| 2 | Rudi Altig (FRG) | Salvarani | + 10" |
| 3 | Domingo Perurena (ESP) | Fagor–Fargas | + 18" |
| 4 | Raymond Steegmans (BEL) | Goldor | + 20" |
| 5 | Dino Zandegù (ITA) | Salvarani | s.t. |
| 6 | Ramón Sáez Marzo (ESP) | Ferrys | s.t. |
| 7 | Erik De Vlaeminck (BEL) | Goldor | s.t. |
| 8 | Michel Grain (FRA) | Bic | s.t. |
| 9 | Michael Wright (GBR) | Bic | s.t. |
| 10 | José Manuel López (ESP) | Fagor–Fargas | s.t. |

== Stage 1b ==
25 April 1968 - Zaragoza to Zaragoza, 4 km (2.5 mi) (ITT)

Stage 1b result

| Rank | Rider | Team | Time |
|---|---|---|---|
| 1 | Jan Janssen (NED) | Pelforth–Sauvage–Lejeune | 4' 34" |
| 2 | Rudi Altig (FRG) | Salvarani | + 18" |
| 3 | José María Errandonea (ESP) | Fagor–Fargas | s.t. |
| 4 | Felice Gimondi (ITA) | Salvarani | + 24" |
| 5 | Erik De Vlaeminck (BEL) | Goldor | s.t. |
| 6 | José Manuel López (ESP) | Fagor–Fargas | s.t. |
| 7 | José Antonio Momeñe (ESP) | Fagor–Fargas | + 30" |
| 8 | Eusebio Vélez (ESP) | Fagor–Fargas | + 31" |
| 9 | Luis Ocaña (ESP) | Fagor–Fargas | s.t. |
| 10 | Domingo Perurena (ESP) | Fagor–Fargas | s.t. |

General classification after Stage 1b

| Rank | Rider | Team | Time |
|---|---|---|---|
| 1 | Jan Janssen (NED) | Pelforth–Sauvage–Lejeune | 3h 06' 34" |
| 2 | Rudi Altig (FRG) | Salvarani | + 28" |
| 3 | José María Errandonea (ESP) | Fagor–Fargas | + 38" |
| 4 | Felice Gimondi (ITA) | Salvarani | + 44" |
| 5 | Domingo Perurena (ESP) | Fagor–Fargas | + 49" |
| 6 | Erik De Vlaeminck (BEL) | Goldor | s.t. |
| 7 | José Manuel López (ESP) | Fagor–Fargas | s.t. |
| 8 | José Antonio Momeñe (ESP) | Fagor–Fargas | + 50" |
| 9 | Lucien Aimar (FRA) | Bic | + 51" |
| 10 | Eusebio Vélez (ESP) | Fagor–Fargas | s.t. |

== Stage 2 ==
26 April 1968 - Zaragoza to Lleida, 195 km (121.2 mi)

Route:

Stage 2 result

| Rank | Rider | Team | Time |
|---|---|---|---|
| 1 | Michael Wright (GBR) | Bic | 4h 40' 01" |
| 2 | Paul Lemeteyer (FRA) | Bic | + 20" |
| 3 | Martin Van Den Bossche (BEL) | Faema | + 40" |
| 4 | Luciano Soave (ITA) | Faema | s.t. |
| 5 | Michel Grain (FRA) | Bic | s.t. |
| 6 | Jan Janssen (NED) | Pelforth–Sauvage–Lejeune | s.t. |
| 7 | Etienne Sonck (BEL) | Goldor | s.t. |
| 8 | Rudi Altig (FRG) | Salvarani | s.t. |
| 9 | Gilbert Verlinde (BEL) | Goldor | s.t. |
| 10 | Willy Vekemans (BEL) | Goldor | s.t. |

General classification after Stage 2

| Rank | Rider | Team | Time |
|---|---|---|---|
| 1 | Jan Janssen (NED) | Pelforth–Sauvage–Lejeune | 7h 47' 15" |
| 2 | Michael Wright (GBR) | Bic | + 27" |
| 3 | Rudi Altig (FRG) | Salvarani | + 28" |
| 4 | José María Errandonea (ESP) | Fagor–Fargas | + 38" |
| 5 | Felice Gimondi (ITA) | Salvarani | + 44" |
| 6 | José Manuel López (ESP) | Fagor–Fargas | + 49" |
| 7 | Erik De Vlaeminck (BEL) | Goldor | s.t. |
| 8 | Domingo Perurena (ESP) | Fagor–Fargas | s.t. |
| 9 | José Antonio Momeñe (ESP) | Fagor–Fargas | + 50" |
| 10 | Lucien Aimar (FRA) | Bic | + 51" |

== Stage 3a ==
27 April 1968 - Lleida to Barcelona, 165 km (103 mi)

Route:

Stage 3a result

| Rank | Rider | Team | Time |
|---|---|---|---|
| 1 | Tommaso de Pra (ITA) | Salvarani | 3h 56' 46" |
| 2 | Jan Janssen (NED) | Pelforth–Sauvage–Lejeune | + 52" |
| 3 | Édouard Delberghe (FRA) | Pelforth–Sauvage–Lejeune | + 1' 00" |
| 4 | Rudi Altig (FRG) | Salvarani | + 1' 02" |
| 5 | Paul Lemeteyer (FRA) | Bic | s.t. |
| 6 | Etienne Sonck (BEL) | Goldor | s.t. |
| 7 | Ramón Sáez Marzo (ESP) | Ferrys | s.t. |
| 8 | Michel Grain (FRA) | Bic | s.t. |
| 9 | Erik De Vlaeminck (BEL) | Goldor | s.t. |
| 10 | Victor Van Schil (BEL) | Faema | s.t. |

== Stage 3b ==
27 April 1968 - Barcelona to Barcelona, 38 km (24 mi)

Stage 3b result

| Rank | Rider | Team | Time |
|---|---|---|---|
| 1 | Rudi Altig (FRG) | Salvarani | 53' 09" |
| 2 | José Antonio Momeñe (ESP) | Fagor–Fargas | + 10" |
| 3 | Lucien Aimar (FRA) | Bic | + 21" |
| 4 | Paul Lemeteyer (FRA) | Bic | + 39" |
| 5 | Raymond Steegmans (BEL) | Goldor | s.t. |
| 6 | Michel Grain (FRA) | Bic | s.t. |
| 7 | Domingo Perurena (ESP) | Fagor–Fargas | s.t. |
| 8 | Etienne Sonck (BEL) | Goldor | s.t. |
| 9 | Andres Incera Paradelo (ESP) | GD Karpy | s.t. |
| 10 | Jan Janssen (NED) | Pelforth–Sauvage–Lejeune | s.t. |

General classification after Stage 3b

| Rank | Rider | Team | Time |
|---|---|---|---|
| 1 | Rudi Altig (FRG) | Salvarani | 12h 38' 40" |
| 2 | Jan Janssen (NED) | Pelforth–Sauvage–Lejeune | + 1" |
| 3 | Tommaso de Pra (ITA) | Salvarani | + 15" |
| 4 | José Antonio Momeñe (ESP) | Fagor–Fargas | + 32" |
| 5 | Michael Wright (GBR) | Bic | + 37" |
| 6 | Lucien Aimar (FRA) | Bic | + 44" |
| 7 | José María Errandonea (ESP) | Fagor–Fargas | + 49" |
| 8 | Felice Gimondi (ITA) | Salvarani | + 55" |
| 9 | Erik De Vlaeminck (BEL) | Goldor | + 1' 00" |
| 10 | José Manuel López (ESP) | Fagor–Fargas | s.t. |

== Stage 4 ==
28 April 1968 - Barcelona to Salou, 108 km (67 mi)

Route:

Stage 4 result

| Rank | Rider | Team | Time |
|---|---|---|---|
| 1 | Michael Wright (GBR) | Bic | 2h 31' 47" |
| 2 | Bernard Van de Kerckhove (BEL) | Pelforth–Sauvage–Lejeune | + 20" |
| 3 | Mario Minieri (ITA) | Salvarani | + 40" |
| 4 | André Planckaert (BEL) | Goldor | s.t. |
| 5 | José Manuel López (ESP) | Fagor–Fargas | s.t. |
| 6 | Anatole Novak (FRA) | Bic | s.t. |
| 7 | Carlos Echeverría Zudaire (ESP) | Kas–Kaskol | s.t. |
| 8 | Edouard Weckx (BEL) | Goldor | s.t. |
| 9 | José Antonio Pontón Ruiz (ESP) | Ferrys | s.t. |
| 10 | Mino Denti (ITA) | Faema | s.t. |

General classification after Stage 4

| Rank | Rider | Team | Time |
|---|---|---|---|
| 1 | Michael Wright (GBR) | Bic | 15h 11' 05" |
| 2 | Rudi Altig (FRG) | Salvarani | + 14" |
| 3 | Jan Janssen (NED) | Pelforth–Sauvage–Lejeune | + 15" |
| 4 | Tommaso de Pra (ITA) | Salvarani | + 29" |
| 5 | Mario Minieri (ITA) | Salvarani | + 46" |
| 6 | Bernard Van de Kerckhove (BEL) | Pelforth–Sauvage–Lejeune | + 49" |
| 7 | Lucien Aimar (FRA) | Bic | + 58" |
| 8 | José Manuel López (ESP) | Fagor–Fargas | + 1' 02" |
| 9 | José María Errandonea (ESP) | Fagor–Fargas | + 1' 03" |
| 10 | Felice Gimondi (ITA) | Salvarani | + 1' 09" |

== Stage 5 ==
29 April 1968 - Salou to Vinaròs, 106 km (66 mi)

Route:

Stage 5 result

| Rank | Rider | Team | Time |
|---|---|---|---|
| 1 | Rudi Altig (FRG) | Salvarani | 2h 23' 55" |
| 2 | Etienne Sonck (BEL) | Goldor | + 20" |
| 3 | Mario Minieri (ITA) | Salvarani | + 40" |
| 4 | Paul Lemeteyer (FRA) | Bic | s.t. |
| 5 | Ramón Sáez Marzo (ESP) | Ferrys | s.t. |
| 6 | Gilbert Verlinde (BEL) | Goldor | s.t. |
| 7 | Wilfried Peffgen (FRG) | Salvarani | s.t. |
| 8 | Jan Janssen (NED) | Pelforth–Sauvage–Lejeune | s.t. |
| 9 | Michel Grain (FRA) | Bic | s.t. |
| 10 | Erik De Vlaeminck (BEL) | Goldor | s.t. |

== Stage 6 ==
30 April 1968 - Vinaròs to Valencia, 148 km (92 mi)

Stage 6 result

| Rank | Rider | Team | Time |
|---|---|---|---|
| 1 | Pietro Guerra (ITA) | Salvarani | 3h 37' 31" |
| 2 | Ramón Sáez Marzo (ESP) | Ferrys | + 24" |
| 3 | Erik De Vlaeminck (BEL) | Goldor | + 47" |
| 4 | Gilbert Verlinde (BEL) | Goldor | s.t. |
| 5 | Martin Van Den Bossche (BEL) | Faema | s.t. |
| 6 | Michael Wright (GBR) | Bic | s.t. |
| 7 | Mario Minieri (ITA) | Salvarani | s.t. |
| 8 | Michel Grain (FRA) | Bic | s.t. |
| 9 | José Pérez Francés (ESP) | Kas–Kaskol | s.t. |
| 10 | Luciano Soave (ITA) | Faema | s.t. |

General classification after Stage 6

| Rank | Rider | Team | Time |
|---|---|---|---|
| 1 | Rudi Altig (FRG) | Salvarani | 21h 13' 32" |
| 2 | Michael Wright (GBR) | Bic | + 36" |
| 3 | Jan Janssen (NED) | Pelforth–Sauvage–Lejeune | + 41" |
| 4 | Tommaso de Pra (ITA) | Salvarani | + 55" |
| 5 | José Antonio Momeñe (ESP) | Fagor–Fargas | + 1' 12" |
| 6 | Bernard Van de Kerckhove (BEL) | Pelforth–Sauvage–Lejeune | + 1' 15" |
| 7 | Pietro Guerra (ITA) | Salvarani | + 1' 16" |
| 8 | Lucien Aimar (FRA) | Bic | + 1' 27" |
| 9 | José Manuel López (ESP) | Fagor–Fargas | + 1' 28" |
| 10 | José María Errandonea (ESP) | Fagor–Fargas | + 1' 29" |

== Stage 7 ==
1 May 1968 - Valencia to Benidorm, 144 km (89 mi)

Route:

Stage 7 result

| Rank | Rider | Team | Time |
|---|---|---|---|
| 1 | Wilfried Peffgen (FRG) | Salvarani | 3h 44' 46" |
| 2 | José Antonio Momeñe (ESP) | Fagor–Fargas | + 20" |
| 3 | Salvador Canet García (ESP) | Ferrys | + 40" |
| 4 | Fernand Etter (FRA) | Pelforth–Sauvage–Lejeune | s.t. |
| 5 | Lino Farisato (ITA) | Faema | s.t. |
| 6 | Arie den Hartog (NED) | Bic | s.t. |
| 7 | Mario Minieri (ITA) | Salvarani | + 46" |
| 8 | Jan Janssen (NED) | Pelforth–Sauvage–Lejeune | s.t. |
| 9 | Raymond Steegmans (BEL) | Goldor | s.t. |
| 10 | Michel Grain (FRA) | Bic | s.t. |

General classification after Stage 7

| Rank | Rider | Team | Time |
|---|---|---|---|
| 1 | Rudi Altig (FRG) | Salvarani | 24h 59' 04" |
| 2 | Michael Wright (GBR) | Bic | + 24" |
| 3 | Jan Janssen (NED) | Pelforth–Sauvage–Lejeune | + 41" |
| 4 | José Antonio Momeñe (ESP) | Fagor–Fargas | + 46" |
| 5 | Tommaso de Pra (ITA) | Salvarani | + 55" |
| 6 | Bernard Van de Kerckhove (BEL) | Pelforth–Sauvage–Lejeune | + 1' 15" |
| 7 | Pietro Guerra (ITA) | Salvarani | + 1' 16" |
| 8 | Lucien Aimar (FRA) | Bic | + 1' 24" |
| 9 | José Manuel López (ESP) | Fagor–Fargas | + 1' 28" |
| 10 | José María Errandonea (ESP) | Fagor–Fargas | + 1' 29" |

== Stage 8 ==
2 May 1968 - Benidorm to Almansa, 167 km (104 mi)

Route:

Stage 8 result

| Rank | Rider | Team | Time |
|---|---|---|---|
| 1 | Manuel Martín Piñera (ESP) | GD Karpy | 4h 33' 39" |
| 2 | Luis Ocaña (ESP) | Fagor–Fargas | + 3' 47" |
| 3 | Jean Vidament (FRA) | Pelforth–Sauvage–Lejeune | + 4' 08" |
| 4 | Luciano Soave (ITA) | Faema | + 4' 11" |
| 5 | Jan Janssen (NED) | Pelforth–Sauvage–Lejeune | + 4' 12" |
| 6 | Michael Wright (GBR) | Bic | + 4' 13" |
| 7 | Felice Gimondi (ITA) | Salvarani | + 4' 14" |
| 8 | Domingo Perurena (ESP) | Fagor–Fargas | s.t. |
| 9 | Erik De Vlaeminck (BEL) | Goldor | s.t. |
| 10 | Rudi Altig (FRG) | Salvarani | s.t. |

General classification after Stage 8

| Rank | Rider | Team | Time |
|---|---|---|---|
| 1 | Manuel Martín Piñera (ESP) | GD Karpy | 29h 34' 40" |
| 2 | Rudi Altig (FRG) | Salvarani | + 2' 17" |
| 3 | Michael Wright (GBR) | Bic | + 2' 42" |
| 4 | Jan Janssen (NED) | Pelforth–Sauvage–Lejeune | + 2' 56" |
| 5 | José Antonio Momeñe (ESP) | Fagor–Fargas | + 3' 03" |
| 6 | Tommaso de Pra (ITA) | Salvarani | + 3' 12" |
| 7 | Bernard Van de Kerckhove (BEL) | Pelforth–Sauvage–Lejeune | + 3' 32" |
| 8 | Luis Ocaña (ESP) | Fagor–Fargas | s.t. |
| 9 | Pietro Guerra (ITA) | Salvarani | + 3' 33" |
| 10 | Lucien Aimar (FRA) | Bic | + 3' 41" |
