= 1968 Vuelta a España, Stage 9 to Stage 18 =

Cycling race stages

The 1968 Vuelta a España was the 23rd edition of the Vuelta a España, one of cycling's Grand Tours. The Vuelta began in Zaragoza on 25 April, and Stage 9 occurred on 3 May with a stage from Almansa. The race finished in Bilbao on 12 May.

== Stage 9 ==
3 May 1968 - Almansa to Alcázar de San Juan, 230 km (142.9 mi)

Route:

Stage 9 result'

Rank	Rider	Team	Time
1	José María Errandonea (ESP)	Fagor–Fargas	5h 52' 20"
2	Michael Wright (GBR)	Bic	+ 20"
3	Vittorio Adorni (FRA)	Faema	+ 40"
4	Rudi Altig (FRG)	Salvarani	s.t.
5	José Pérez Francés (ESP)	Kas–Kaskol	s.t.
6	Jan Janssen (NED)	Pelforth–Sauvage–Lejeune	s.t.
7	Ramón Sáez Marzo (ESP)	Ferrys	s.t.
8	Wilfried Peffgen (FRG)	Salvarani	s.t.
9	Johny Schleck (LUX)	Pelforth–Sauvage–Lejeune	s.t.
10	Paul Lemeteyer (FRA)	Bic	s.t.

General classification after Stage 9

Rank	Rider	Team	Time
1	Rudi Altig (FRG)	Salvarani	35h 29' 57"
2	Michael Wright (GBR)	Bic	+ 5"
3	Jan Janssen (NED)	Pelforth–Sauvage–Lejeune	+ 39"
4	José Antonio Momeñe (ESP)	Fagor–Fargas	+ 46"
5	José María Errandonea (ESP)	Fagor–Fargas	+ 49"
6	Lucien Aimar (FRA)	Bic	+ 1' 24"
7	Wilfried Peffgen (FRG)	Salvarani	+ 1' 34"
8	Felice Gimondi (ITA)	Salvarani	+ 1' 35"
9	Mino Denti (ITA)	Faema	+ 1' 37"
10	Jean Vidament (FRA)	Pelforth–Sauvage–Lejeune	+ 1' 38"

== Stage 10 ==
4 May 1968 - Alcázar de San Juan to Madrid, 173 km (107.5 mi)

Route:

Stage 10 result'

Rank	Rider	Team	Time
1	Domingo Perurena (ESP)	Fagor–Fargas	4h 02' 16"
2	Rudi Altig (FRG)	Salvarani	+ 21"
3	Jan Janssen (NED)	Pelforth–Sauvage–Lejeune	+ 41"
4	José Manuel López (ESP)	Fagor–Fargas	s.t.
5	Victor Van Schil (BEL)	Faema	s.t.
6	Lucien Aimar (FRA)	Bic	s.t.
7	José María Errandonea (ESP)	Fagor–Fargas	s.t.
8	Michael Wright (GBR)	Bic	s.t.
9	Wilfried Peffgen (FRG)	Salvarani	s.t.
10	Johny Schleck (LUX)	Pelforth–Sauvage–Lejeune	s.t.

General classification after Stage 10

Rank	Rider	Team	Time
1	Rudi Altig (FRG)	Salvarani	39h 32' 34"
2	Michael Wright (GBR)	Bic	+ 25"
3	Jan Janssen (NED)	Pelforth–Sauvage–Lejeune	+ 59"
4	José Antonio Momeñe (ESP)	Fagor–Fargas	+ 1' 06"
5	José María Errandonea (ESP)	Fagor–Fargas	+ 1' 09"
6	Lucien Aimar (FRA)	Bic	+ 1' 44"
7	Wilfried Peffgen (FRG)	Salvarani	+ 1' 54"
8	Felice Gimondi (ITA)	Salvarani	+ 1' 55"
9	Carlos Echeverría Zudaire (ESP)	Kas–Kaskol	+ 1'59"
10	Eusebio Vélez (ESP)	Fagor–Fargas	+ 2' 02"

== Stage 11 ==
5 May 1968 - Madrid to Palencia, 242 km (150.4 mi)

Route:

Stage 11 result'

Rank	Rider	Team	Time
1	Ramón Sáez Marzo (ESP)	Ferrys	6h 09' 26"
2	José Manuel López (ESP)	Fagor–Fargas	+ 21"
3	Antonio Gómez del Moral (ESP)	Kas–Kaskol	+ 30"
4	André Planckaert (BEL)	Goldor	+ 40"
5	Jan Janssen (NED)	Pelforth–Sauvage–Lejeune	s.t.
6	Michel Grain (FRA)	Bic	s.t.
7	Andrés Gandarias (ESP)	Kas–Kaskol	s.t.
8	Vicente López Carril (ESP)	Kas–Kaskol	s.t.
9	Rudi Altig (FRG)	Salvarani	s.t.
10	Paul Lemeteyer (FRA)	Bic	s.t.

General classification after Stage 11

Rank	Rider	Team	Time
1	Rudi Altig (FRG)	Salvarani	45h 42' 40"
2	Michael Wright (GBR)	Bic	+ 25"
3	Jan Janssen (NED)	Pelforth–Sauvage–Lejeune	+ 59"
4	José Antonio Momeñe (ESP)	Fagor–Fargas	+ 1' 06"
5	José María Errandonea (ESP)	Fagor–Fargas	+ 1' 09"
6	Lucien Aimar (FRA)	Bic	+ 1' 44"
7	Wilfried Peffgen (FRG)	Salvarani	+ 1' 54"
8	Antonio Gómez del Moral (ESP)	Kas–Kaskol	s.t.
9	Felice Gimondi (ITA)	Salvarani	+ 1' 55"
10	Carlos Echeverría Zudaire (ESP)	Kas–Kaskol	+ 1' 59"

== Stage 12 ==
6 May 1968 - Villalón de Campos to Gijón, 236 km (146.6 mi)

Route:

Stage 12 result'

Rank	Rider	Team	Time
1	José Pérez Francés (ESP)	Kas–Kaskol	7h 05' 34"
2	Jozef Spruyt (BEL)	Faema	+ 22"
3	Antonio Gómez del Moral (ESP)	Kas–Kaskol	+ 1' 23"
4	José Manuel López (ESP)	Fagor–Fargas	+ 1' 29"
5	Felice Gimondi (ITA)	Salvarani	s.t.
6	Jan Janssen (NED)	Pelforth–Sauvage–Lejeune	s.t.
7	Vittorio Adorni (FRA)	Faema	s.t.
8	Ventura Díaz (ESP)	Ferrys	s.t.
9	Vicente López Carril (ESP)	Kas–Kaskol	s.t.
10	José Goyeneche (ESP)	GD Karpy	s.t.

== Stage 13 ==
7 May 1968 - Gijón to Santander, 203 km (126 mi)

Stage 13 result'

Rank	Rider	Team	Time
1	Victor Van Schil (BEL)	Faema	5h 29' 13"
2	Wilfried Peffgen (FRG)	Salvarani	+ 20"
3	Jesús Aranzabal (ESP)	Fagor–Fargas	+ 40"
4	Ventura Díaz (ESP)	Ferrys	s.t.
5	Fernand Etter (FRA)	Pelforth–Sauvage–Lejeune	s.t.
6	Francisco Gabica (ESP)	Fagor–Fargas	s.t.
7	Lino Farisato (ITA)	Faema	s.t.
8	Pietro Guerra (ITA)	Salvarani	s.t.
9	Domingo Perurena (ESP)	Fagor–Fargas	+ 2' 33"
10	Luciano Soave (ITA)	Faema	+ 2' 35"

General classification after Stage 13

Rank	Rider	Team	Time
1	José Pérez Francés (ESP)	Kas–Kaskol	58h 21' 58"
2	Jan Janssen (NED)	Pelforth–Sauvage–Lejeune	+ 20"
3	José María Errandonea (ESP)	Fagor–Fargas	+ 30"
4	Jozef Spruyt (BEL)	Faema	+ 40"
5	Lucien Aimar (FRA)	Bic	+ 1' 05"
6	Antonio Gómez del Moral (ESP)	Kas–Kaskol	+ 1' 09"
7	Felice Gimondi (ITA)	Salvarani	+ 1' 16"
8	Carlos Echeverría Zudaire (ESP)	Kas–Kaskol	+ 1' 20"
9	Eusebio Vélez (ESP)	Fagor–Fargas	+ 1' 23"
10	Vittorio Adorni (FRA)	Faema	+ 1' 31"

== Stage 14 ==
8 May 1968 - Santander to Vitoria, 244 km (152 mi)

Route:

Stage 14 result'

Rank	Rider	Team	Time
1	Eduardo Castelló (ESP)	Ferrys	6h 31' 28"
2	José Manuel Lasa (ESP)	Kas–Kaskol	+ 2' 17"
3	Vicente López Carril (ESP)	Kas–Kaskol	+ 2' 29"
4	Felice Gimondi (ITA)	Salvarani	+ 2' 37"
5	Fernando Manzaneque (ESP)	GD Karpy	s.t.
6	Eusebio Vélez (ESP)	Fagor–Fargas	+ 3' 32"
7	Sebastián Elorza (ESP)	Kas–Kaskol	s.t.
8	Francisco Gabica (ESP)	Fagor–Fargas	+ 3' 54"
9	José Manuel López (ESP)	Fagor–Fargas	+ 4' 04"
10	Jan Janssen (NED)	Pelforth–Sauvage–Lejeune	s.t.

General classification after Stage 14

Rank	Rider	Team	Time
1	Felice Gimondi (ITA)	Salvarani	64h 57' 19"
2	José Pérez Francés (ESP)	Kas–Kaskol	+ 11"
3	Jan Janssen (NED)	Pelforth–Sauvage–Lejeune	+ 31"
4	José María Errandonea (ESP)	Fagor–Fargas	+ 41"
5	Jozef Spruyt (BEL)	Faema	+ 51"
6	Eusebio Vélez (ESP)	Fagor–Fargas	+ 58"
7	Lucien Aimar (FRA)	Bic	+ 1' 16"
8	Antonio Gómez del Moral (ESP)	Kas–Kaskol	+ 1' 20"
9	Carlos Echeverría Zudaire (ESP)	Kas–Kaskol	+ 1' 31"
10	Vittorio Adorni (FRA)	Faema	+ 1' 42"

== Stage 15 ==
9 May 1968 - Vitoria to Pamplona, ~~144.5 km (89.8 mi)~~

Route:

Stage annulled.

== Stage 16 ==
10 May 1968 - Pamplona to San Sebastián, 204 km (127 mi)

Route:

Stage 16 result'

Rank	Rider	Team	Time
1	Luis Santamarina (ESP)	Fagor–Fargas	5h 42' 16"
2	Wilfried Peffgen (FRG)	Salvarani	+ 1' 30"
3	Andrés Gandarias (ESP)	Kas–Kaskol	+ 1' 50"
4	Manuel Martín Piñera (ESP)	GD Karpy	s.t.
5	Domingo Perurena (ESP)	Fagor–Fargas	+ 2' 35"
6	Michael Wright (GBR)	Bic	+ 2' 37"
7	Francisco Gabica (ESP)	Fagor–Fargas	s.t.
8	Ventura Díaz (ESP)	Ferrys	s.t.
9	Fernando Manzaneque (ESP)	GD Karpy	s.t.
10	Victor Van Schil (BEL)	Faema	+ 3' 30"

General classification after Stage 16

Rank	Rider	Team	Time
1	Felice Gimondi (ITA)	Salvarani	70h 44' 09"
2	José Pérez Francés (ESP)	Kas–Kaskol	+ 11"
3	Jan Janssen (NED)	Pelforth–Sauvage–Lejeune	+ 31"
4	José María Errandonea (ESP)	Fagor–Fargas	+ 41"
5	Jozef Spruyt (BEL)	Faema	+ 51"
6	Eusebio Vélez (ESP)	Fagor–Fargas	+ 52"
7	Lucien Aimar (FRA)	Bic	+ 1' 16"
8	Antonio Gómez del Moral (ESP)	Kas–Kaskol	+ 1' 20"
9	Carlos Echeverría Zudaire (ESP)	Kas–Kaskol	+ 1' 31"
10	Vittorio Adorni (FRA)	Faema	+ 1' 42"

== Stage 17 ==
11 May 1968 - San Sebastián to Tolosa, 67 km (42 mi) (ITT)

Route:

Stage 17 result'

Rank	Rider	Team	Time
1	Felice Gimondi (ITA)	Salvarani	1h 44' 38"
2	José Pérez Francés (ESP)	Kas–Kaskol	+ 2' 04"
3	Vittorio Adorni (FRA)	Faema	+ 3' 44"
4	Eusebio Vélez (ESP)	Fagor–Fargas	+ 4' 16"
5	Rudi Altig (FRG)	Salvarani	+ 4' 19"
6	Carlos Echeverría Zudaire (ESP)	Kas–Kaskol	s.t.
7	Francisco Gabica (ESP)	Fagor–Fargas	+ 4' 29"
8	Antonio Gómez del Moral (ESP)	Kas–Kaskol	+ 4' 35"
9	José María Errandonea (ESP)	Fagor–Fargas	+ 4' 38"
10	Andrés Gandarias (ESP)	Kas–Kaskol	+ 5' 06"

General classification after Stage 17

Rank	Rider	Team	Time
1	Felice Gimondi (ITA)	Salvarani	72h 28' 47"
2	José Pérez Francés (ESP)	Kas–Kaskol	+ 2' 15"
3	Eusebio Vélez (ESP)	Fagor–Fargas	+ 5' 08"
4	José María Errandonea (ESP)	Fagor–Fargas	+ 5' 19"
5	Vittorio Adorni (FRA)	Faema	+ 5' 26"
6	Jan Janssen (NED)	Pelforth–Sauvage–Lejeune	+ 5' 43"
7	Antonio Gómez del Moral (ESP)	Kas–Kaskol	+ 5' 55"
8	Carlos Echeverría Zudaire (ESP)	Kas–Kaskol	+ 6' 00"
9	Lucien Aimar (FRA)	Bic	+ 6' 42"
10	Jozef Spruyt (BEL)	Faema	+ 6' 50"

== Stage 18 ==
12 May 1968 - Tolosa to Bilbao, 206 km (128 mi)

Route:

Stage 18 result'

Rank	Rider	Team	Time
1	Manuel Martín Piñera (ESP)	GD Karpy	5h 56' 29"
2	Ventura Díaz (ESP)	Ferrys	+ 1' 08"
3	José Manuel López (ESP)	Fagor–Fargas	+ 2' 14"
4	Sebastián Elorza (ESP)	Kas–Kaskol	s.t.
5	Juan José Sagarduy (ESP)	GD Karpy	+ 2' 18"
6	Jesús Aranzabal (ESP)	Fagor–Fargas	s.t.
7	Gregorio San Miguel (ESP)	Kas–Kaskol	+ 2' 34"
8	Francisco Gabica (ESP)	Fagor–Fargas	+ 3' 36"
9	José Antonio Momeñe (ESP)	Fagor–Fargas	+ 3' 38"
10	Michel Grain (FRA)	Bic	s.t.

General classification after Stage 18

Rank	Rider	Team	Time
1	Felice Gimondi (ITA)	Salvarani	78h 29' 00"
2	José Pérez Francés (ESP)	Kas–Kaskol	+ 2' 15"
3	Eusebio Vélez (ESP)	Fagor–Fargas	+ 5' 00"
4	José María Errandonea (ESP)	Fagor–Fargas	+ 5' 19"
5	Vittorio Adorni (FRA)	Faema	+ 5' 26"
6	Jan Janssen (NED)	Pelforth–Sauvage–Lejeune	+ 5' 43"
7	Antonio Gómez del Moral (ESP)	Kas–Kaskol	+ 5' 55"
8	Carlos Echeverría Zudaire (ESP)	Kas–Kaskol	+ 6' 00"
9	Lucien Aimar (FRA)	Bic	+ 6' 42"
10	Jozef Spruyt (BEL)	Faema	+ 7' 50"
