= 1969 Vuelta a España =

Race details
- Dates: 23 April – 11 May
- Stages: 18
- Distance: 2,921.4 km (1,815 mi)
- Winning time: 73h 18' 45"

Results
| Jersey awarded to the overall winner | Winner | Roger Pingeon (FRA) | (Peugeot–BP–Michelin) |
| | Second | Luis Ocaña (ESP) | (Fagor) |
| | Third | Rini Wagtmans (NED) | (Willem II) |
| Jersey awarded to the points classification winner | Points | Raymond Steegmans (BEL) | (Goldor) |
| | Mountains | Luis Ocaña (ESP) | (Fagor) |
| | Sprints | Juan María Uribezubia (ESP) | (Karpy) |

The 24th Edition Vuelta a España (Tour of Spain), a long-distance bicycle stage race and one of the three grand tours, was held from 23 April to 11 May 1969. It consisted of 18 stages covering a total of 2,921.4 km (1,815.3 mi), and was won by Roger Pingeon of the Peugeot cycling team. Raymond Steegmans won the points competition and Luis Ocaña, who demonstrated his time trialling skills by winning the prologue and two time trials in the race, won the mountains classification.

== Route ==
List of stages
| Stage | Date | Course | Distance | Type | Winner |
|---|---|---|---|---|---|
| 1a | 23 April | Badajoz to Badajoz | 6.5 km (4 mi) | Individual time trial | Luis Ocaña (ESP) |
| 1b | 24 April | Badajoz to Badajoz | 246 km (153 mi) | | Michael Wright (GBR) |
| 2 | 25 April | Badajoz to Cáceres | 135 km (84 mi) | | Felice Salina (ITA) |
| 3 | 26 April | Cáceres to Talavera de la Reina | 190 km (118 mi) | | Luigi Sgarbozza (ITA) |
| 4 | 27 April | Talavera de la Reina to Madrid | 124 km (77 mi) | | Domingo Perurena (ESP) |
| 5 | 28 April | Madrid to Alcázar de San Juan | 162 km (101 mi) | | Raymond Steegmans (BEL) |
| 6 | 29 April | Alcázar de San Juan to Almansa | 231 km (144 mi) | | Edward Sels (BEL) |
| 7 | 30 April | Almansa to Nules | 233 km (145 mi) | | Ramón Sáez (ESP) |
| 8 | 1 May | Nules to Benicàssim | 199 km (124 mi) | | Ramón Sáez (ESP) |
| 9 | 2 May | Benicàssim to Reus | 169 km (105 mi) | | José Manuel López Rodríguez (ESP) |
| 10 | 3 May | Reus to Barcelona | 146 km (91 mi) | | Manuel Martín Piñera (ESP) |
| 11 | 4 May | Barcelona to Sant Feliu de Guíxols | 118 km (73 mi) | | Nemesio Jiménez (ESP) |
| 12 | 5 May | Sant Feliu de Guíxols to Moià | 151 km (94 mi) | | Roger Pingeon (FRA) |
| 13 | 6 May | Moià to Barbastro | 229 km (142 mi) | | Michael Wright (GBR) |
| 14a | 7 May | Barbastro to Zaragoza | 125 km (78 mi) | | Raymond Steegmans (BEL) |
| 14b | 7 May | Zaragoza to Zaragoza | 4 km (2 mi) | Individual time trial | Roger Pingeon (FRA) |
| 15 | 8 May | Zaragoza to Pamplona | 176 km (109 mi) | | Mariano Díaz (ESP) |
| 16 | 9 May | Irun to San Sebastián | 25 km (16 mi) | Individual time trial | Luis Ocaña (ESP) |
| 17 | 10 May | San Sebastián to Vitoria | 129 km (80 mi) | | Gregorio San Miguel (ESP) |
| 18a | 11 May | Vitoria to Llodio | 76 km (47 mi) | | Ercole Gualazzini (ITA) |
| 18b | 11 May | Llodio to Bilbao | 29 km (18 mi) | Individual time trial | Luis Ocaña (ESP) |
| | Total | | 2,921.4 km (1,815 mi) | | |

== Results ==
Final general classification
| Rank | Rider | Team | Time |
|---|---|---|---|
| 1 | (France) Roger Pingeon | Peugeot–BP–Michelin | 73h 18' 45" |
| 2 | (Spain) Luis Ocaña | Fagor | + 1' 54" |
| 3 | (Netherlands) Rini Wagtmans | Willem II | + 5' 10" |
| 4 | (Spain) José Manuel Lasa | Pepsi Cola | + 5' 10" |
| 5 | (United Kingdom) Michael Wright | Bic | + 5' 27" |
| 6 | (West Germany) Rolf Wolfshohl | Bic | + 6' 11" |
| 7 | (France) Gilbert Bellone | Bic | + 6' 47" |
| 8 | (Spain) Gregorio San Miguel | Kas–Kaskol | + 7' 05" |
| 9 | (Spain) Carlos Echeverría | Kas–Kaskol | + 7' 35" |
| 10 | (Spain) Eusebio Vélez | Fagor | + 7' 51" |
| 11 | (Spain) Salvador Canet | Pepsi Cola | |
| 12 | (Spain) José-Antonio González | Kas–Kaskol | |
| 13 | (Spain) Ventura Díaz Arrey | Karpy | |
| 14 | (Belgium) Willy De Geest | Pull Over Centrale | |
| 15 | (Spain) José Manuel Lopez | Fagor | |
| 16 | (Spain) Francisco Gabica | Fagor | |
| 17 | (Spain) Jorge Mariné Torres | Pepsi Cola | |
| 18 | (Spain) Eduardo Castelló Villanova | Kas–Kaskol | |
| 19 | (Spain) Ramon Sáez Marzo | Pepsi Cola | |
| 20 | (Spain) Juan María Uribezubia | Karpy | |
| 21 | (Spain) Miguel María Lasa | Pepsi Cola | |
| 22 | (Spain) Luis-Pedro Santamarina | Fagor | |
| 23 | (Spain) Domingo Perurena | Fagor | |
| 24 | (Belgium) Herman Flabat | Pull Over Centrale | |
| 25 | (Spain) Aurelio González Puente | Kas–Kaskol | |
