= Tour du Condroz =

Belgian cycling race

Race details
- Date: May, June, August
- Region: Brussels-Capital Region, Wallonia (Belgium)
- English name: Tour of the Condroz
- Local name(s): Tour de Condroz (in French)
- Discipline: Road
- Competition: Cat. 1.2
- Type: One-day race

History
- First edition: 1959
- Editions: 20
- Final edition: 1978
- First winner: René Vanderveken (BEL)
- Most wins: Victor Van Schil (BEL); (3 wins)
- Final winner: Joseph Bruyère (BEL)

The Tour de Condroz was a Belgian cycling race organized for the last time in 1978.

With Brussels as starting place, the major part of the course was situated in the Condroz region of the Ardennes, Liège. Nandrin was the finish place.

The competition's roll of honor includes the successes of Freddy Maertens and Eddy Merckx. The record of victories, however, belongs to Victor Van Schil.

== Winners ==
Year	Winner	Second	Third
1959	(Belgium) René Vanderveken	(Belgium) Lucien Flohimont	(Belgium) René Beullens
1960	(Belgium) Pierre Jacquemyns	(Belgium) André Van Houtven	(Belgium) Pierre Schmitz
1961	(Belgium) Barthélémy Gillard	(Netherlands) Frits Knoops	(Netherlands) Hubertus Zilverberg
1962	(Belgium) Victor Van Schil	(Belgium) Constant De Keyser	(Belgium) Andre Bar
1963	(Belgium) Martin Van Geneugden	(Belgium) Rene Vanderveken	(Belgium) Ludo Janssens
1964	(United Kingdom) Michael Wright	(Belgium) Martin Van Den Bossche	(Belgium) Marcel Janssens
1965	(Netherlands) Huub Harings	(Belgium) Albert Lacroix	(Belgium) Victor Van Schil
1966	(Belgium) Pierre Vreys	(Belgium) Roger Blockx	(Belgium) Joseph Spruyt
1967	(Belgium) Eddy Merckx	(Netherlands) Wim Schepers	(Belgium) Willy In 't Ven
1968	(Belgium) Jos Huysmans	(Belgium) Willy In 't Ven	(Belgium) Michel Jacquemin
1969	(United Kingdom) Michael Wright	(Germany) Winfried Bölke	(Belgium) Edward Janssens
1970	(Belgium) Victor Van Schil	(Belgium) Joseph Bruyère	(Belgium) Emiel Cambre
1971	(France) Guy Santy	(France) Francis Campaner	(Belgium) André Doyen
1972	(Belgium) Victor Van Schil	(Belgium) Herman Beysens	(Belgium) Herman Van Springel
1973	(Belgium) Freddy Maertens	(Belgium) Marc Sohet	(Belgium) Willy In 't Ven
1974	(Belgium) Frans Verbeeck	(Belgium) Ludo Van Staeyen	(Belgium) Englebert Opdebeeck
1975	(Belgium) Christian De Buysschere	(Belgium) Jacques Martin	(Belgium) Frans Van Looy
1976	(Belgium) Jos Jacobs	(Belgium) Michel Pollentier	(Belgium) Walter Godefroot
1977	(Belgium) Eddy Merckx	(Belgium) André Dierickx	(Belgium) Joseph Bruyère
1978	(Belgium) Joseph Bruyère	(Belgium) André Delcroix	(Belgium) Willy In 't Ven
