= 1968 Vuelta a España =

Race details
- Dates: 25 April – 12 May
- Stages: 18
- Distance: 3,014 km (1,873 mi)
- Winning time: 78h 29' 00"

Results
Jersey awarded to the overall winner	Winner	Felice Gimondi (ITA)	(Salvarani)
	Second	José Pérez Francés (ESP)	(Kas–Kaskol)
	Third	Eusebio Vélez (ESP)	(Fagor)
Jersey awarded to the points classification winner	Points	Jan Janssen (NED)	(Pelforth)
	Mountains	Francisco Gabica (ESP)	(Fagor)
	Sprints	Carlos Echeverría (ESP)	(KAS)

The 23rd edition of Vuelta a España (Tour of Spain), a long-distance bicycle stage race and one of the three grand tours, was held from 25 April to 12 May 1968. It consisted of 18 stages covering a total of 3,014 km (1,873 mi). Basque nationalist ETA terrorists detonated a bomb along the course on stage 15, causing that day's racing to be annulled. The race was won by Felice Gimondi of the Salvarani cycling team. With this win in the 1968 Vuelta a España, the 1967 Giro d'Italia and the 1965 Tour de France, Gimondi became the second cyclist after Jacques Anquetil to win all three grand tours in his career. Defending champion Jan Janssen won the points competition and 1966 champion Francisco Gabica won the mountains classification.

== Route ==
List of stages
Stage	Date	Course	Distance	Type	Winner
1a	25 April	Zaragoza to Zaragoza	130 km (81 mi)		Jan Janssen (NED)
1b	25 April	Zaragoza to Zaragoza	4 km (2 mi)	Individual time trial	Jan Janssen (NED)
2	26 April	Zaragoza to Lleida	195 km (121 mi)		Michael Wright (GBR)
3a	27 April	Lleida to Barcelona	165 km (103 mi)		Tommaso de Pra (ITA)
3b	27 April	Barcelona to Barcelona	38 km (24 mi)		Rudi Altig (FRG)
4	28 April	Barcelona to Salou	108 km (67 mi)		Michael Wright (GBR)
5	29 April	Salou to Vinaròs	106 km (66 mi)		Rudi Altig (FRG)
6	30 April	Vinaròs to Valencia	148 km (92 mi)		Pietro Guerra (ITA)
7	1 May	Valencia to Benidorm	144 km (89 mi)		Wilfried Peffgen (FRG)
8	2 May	Benidorm to Almansa	167 km (104 mi)		Manuel Martín Piñera (ESP)
9	3 May	Almansa to Alcázar de San Juan	230 km (143 mi)		José María Errandonea (ESP)
10	4 May	Alcázar de San Juan to Madrid	173 km (107 mi)		Domingo Perurena (ESP)
11	5 May	Madrid to Palencia	242 km (150 mi)		Ramón Sáez (ESP)
12	6 May	Villalón de Campos to Gijón	236 km (147 mi)		José Pérez Francés (ESP)
13	7 May	Gijón to Santander	203 km (126 mi)		Victor Van Schil (BEL)
14	8 May	Santander to Vitoria	244 km (152 mi)		Eduardo Castelló (ESP)
15	9 May	Vitoria to Pamplona			Annulled
16	10 May	Pamplona to San Sebastián	204 km (127 mi)		Luis Santamarina (ESP)
17	11 May	San Sebastián to Tolosa	67 km (42 mi)	Individual time trial	Felice Gimondi (ITA)
18	12 May	Tolosa to Bilbao	206 km (128 mi)		Manuel Martín Piñera (ESP)
	Total		3,014 km (1,873 mi)		

== Results ==
=== Final General Classification ===
Rank	Rider	Team	Time
1	(Italy) Felice Gimondi	Salvarani	78h 29' 00"
2	(Spain) José Pérez Francés	Kas–Kaskol	+ 2' 15"
3	(Spain) Eusebio Vélez	Fagor	+ 5' 08"
4	(Spain) José María Errandonea	Fagor	+ 5' 19"
5	(Italy) Vittorio Adorni	Faema	+ 5' 26"
6	(Netherlands) Jan Janssen	Pelforth	+ 5' 43"
7	(Spain) Antonio Gómez del Moral	Kas–Kaskol	+ 5' 55"
8	(Spain) Carlos Echeverría	Kas–Kaskol	+ 6' 00"
9	(France) Lucien Aimar	Bic	+ 6' 40"
10	(Belgium) Jos Spruyt	Faema	+ 7' 50"
11	(Spain) Luis Otaño Arcelus	Fagor	
12	(France) Jean-Pierre Ducasse	Pelforth	
13	(Spain) Francisco Gabica	Fagor	
14	(United Kingdom) Michael Wright	Bic	
15	(Spain) Ventura Díaz Arrey	Ferrys	
16	(Spain) José Manuel Lopez	Fagor	
17	(Spain) José Antonio Momeñe	Fagor	
18	(West Germany) Rudi Altig	Salvarani	
19	(Spain) Andrés Gandarias	Kas–Kaskol	
20	(Netherlands) Cees Haast	Bic	
21	(Spain) Fernando Manzaneque	Karpy	
22	(West Germany) Wilfried Peffgen	Salvarani	
23	(Belgium) Victor Van Schil	Faema	
24	(Spain) Domingo Perurena	Fagor	
25	(Spain) Sebastián Elorza Uria	Kas–Kaskol	
