= 1969 Volta a Catalunya =

Race details
- Dates: 9–16 September 1969
- Stages: 8
- Distance: 1,528.9 km (950.0 mi)
- Winning time: 40h 04' 50"

Results
	Winner	Mariano Díaz (ESP)
	Second	Franco Bitossi (ITA)
	Third	Jesús Manzaneque (ESP)

The 1969 Volta a Catalunya was the 49th edition of the Volta a Catalunya cycle race and was held from 9 September to 16 September 1969. The race started in Figueres and finished in Manresa. The race was won by Mariano Díaz.

== General classification ==
Final general classification

Rank	Rider	Time
1	Mariano Díaz (ESP)	40h 04' 50"
2	Franco Bitossi (ITA)	+ 8"
3	Jesús Manzaneque (ESP)	+ 27"
4	Vicente López Carril (ESP)	+ 27"
5	Marcello Bergamo (ITA)	+ 45"
6	Joaquim Galera (ESP)	+ 1' 00"
7	Gabriel Mascaró Febrer (ESP)	+ 1' 03"
8	Ugo Colombo (ITA)	+ 1' 07"
9	Wladimiro Panizza (ITA)	+ 1' 19"
10	Luis Santamarina (ESP)	+ 1' 36"
