= Luigi Sgarbozza =

Italian cyclist

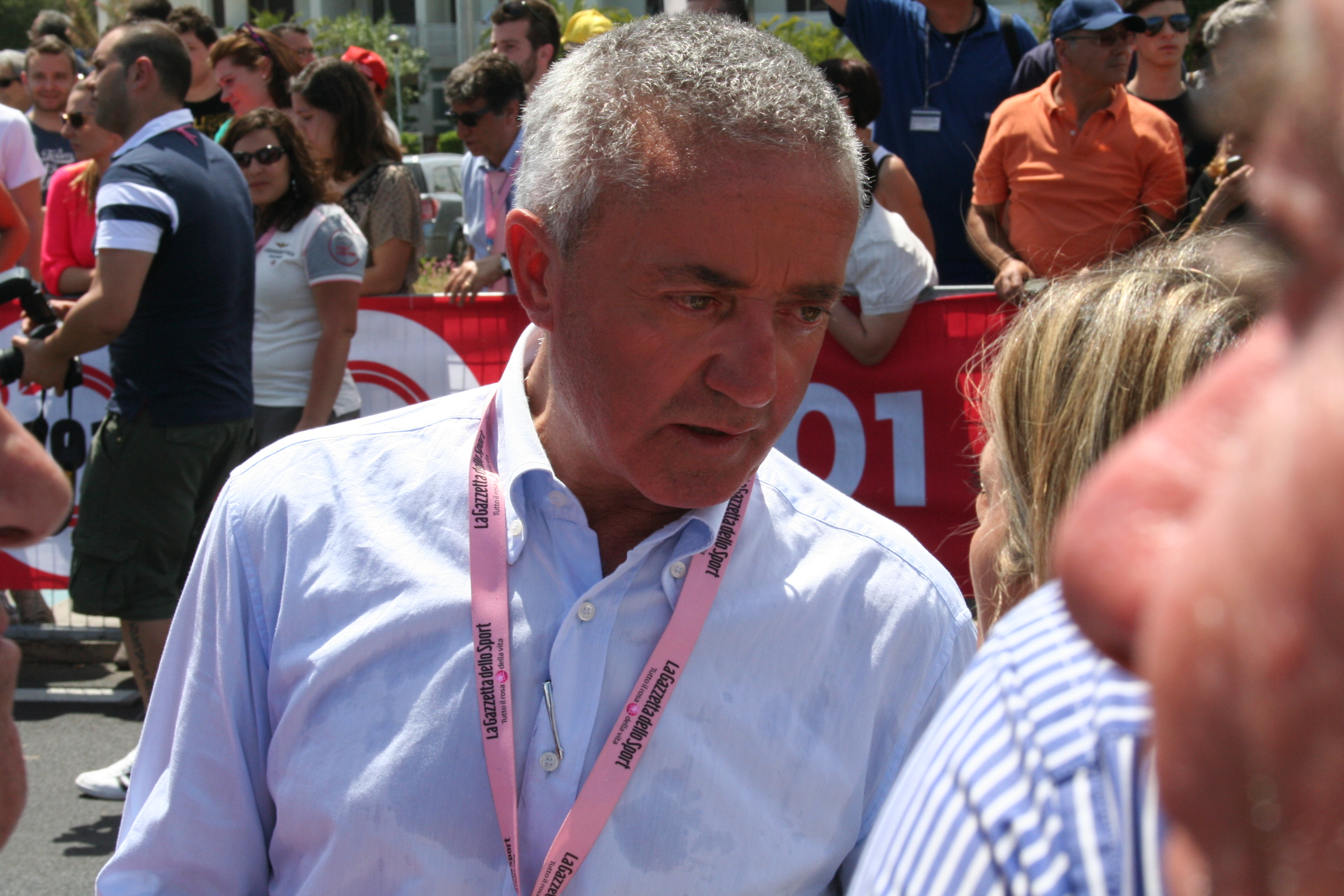
- Sgarbozza in 2013

Personal information
- Nickname: Gigi
- Born: 21 June 1944 (age 82) Amaseno, Italy

Cycling career
- Sport: Cycling
- Current team: Retired
- Discipline: Road
- Role: Rider
- Rider type: Sprinter

Professional teams
- 1967: Salamini–Comet
- 1968–1969: Max Meyer
- 1970: Dreher
- 1971: G.B.C.–Zimba
- 1972: Commercio Petroli

Major wins
- Grand Tours Giro d'Italia 1 individual stage (1968) Vuelta a España 1 individual stage (1969)

Luigi Sgarbozza (born 21 June 1944, in Amaseno) is an Italian former cyclist.

== Major results ==
1966
1st Giro d'Abruzzo
1967
2nd Trofeo Matteotti
1968
1st Stage 14 Giro d'Italia
1969
1st Stage 3 Vuelta a España
2nd Trofeo Matteotti
3rd Sassari–Cagliari
1970
2nd Overall Giro della Provincia di Reggio Calabria
3rd Milano–Vignola
1971
2nd Giro dell'Umbria
3rd Milano–Vignola
