= Mariano Díaz (cyclist) =

Spanish cyclist (1939–2014)

Personal information
- Full name: Mariano Díaz Díaz
- Born: 17 September 1939 Villarejo de Salvanés, Spain
- Died: 5 April 2014 (aged 74) Madrid, Spain
- Height: 1.59 m (5 ft 3 in)
- Weight: 63 kg (139 lb)

Cycling career
- Sport: Cycling
- Discipline: Road
- Role: Rider
- Rider type: Climber

Professional teams
- 1965: Ferrys
- 1966–1969: Fagor
- 1970: La Casera–Peña Bahamontes
- 1971: Orbéa–O.A.R.

Major wins
- Grand Tours Tour de France 1 individual stage (1969) Vuelta a España Mountains classification (1967) 2 individual stages (1967, 1969) Stage races Volta a Catalunya (1969)

Mariano Díaz Díaz (17 September 1939 – 5 April 2014) was a Spanish professional road bicycle racer. In 1967, he won a stage of the 1967 Vuelta a España, and also won the mountains classification. He also competed in the individual road race and team time trial events at the 1964 Summer Olympics.

== Major results ==
1963
1st Overall Vuelta a Navarra
1964
1st Overall Vuelta a Navarra
1965
1st Overall Tour de l'Avenir

1st Mountains classification
1st Stages 2 & 10

1st Overall Vuelta a Navarra
3rd Overall Circuit de la Sarthe
7th Subida al Naranco
1966
1st Overall Vuelta a los Valles Mineros
1st Stage 5 Eibarko Bizikleta
1st Stage 4 Vuelta a Ávila
4th Subida al Naranco
10th Overall Volta a Catalunya
1967
9th Overall Vuelta a España

1st Mountains classification
1st Stage 11

1968
1st Overall Vuelta a Levante
1st Overall Setmana Catalana de Ciclisme
4th Overall Tour de Romandie
5th Overall Eibarko Bizikleta
1969
1st Overall Volta a Catalunya
1st Stage 7 Tour de France
1st Stage 15 Vuelta a España
1st Stage 7 Tour de Suisse
3rd Overall Tour of the Basque Country
3rd Gran Premio Nuestra Señora de Oro
3rd GP Leganés
