= Fernand Etter =

French cyclist

Personal information
- Born: 4 August 1941
- Died: 4 January 1997 (aged 55)

Cycling career
- Sport: Cycling
- Role: Rider

Fernand Etter (4 August 1941 – 4 January 1997) was a French racing cyclist. He rode in the 1967 Tour de France. He won the GP du Midi Libre in 1967.
