= Victor Nuelant =

Belgian cyclist

Personal information
- Born: 2 March 1945 (age 81)

Cycling career
- Sport: Cycling
- Role: Rider

Victor Nuelant (born 2 March 1945) is a Belgian racing cyclist. He rode in the 1970 Tour de France.
