= Jean Vidament =

French cyclist

Personal information
- Born: 24 January 1944 (age 82)

Cycling career
- Sport: Cycling
- Role: Rider

Jean Vidament (born 24 January 1944) is a French racing cyclist. He rode in the 1970 Tour de France.
