= Claudio Michelotto =

Italian cyclist (1942–2025)

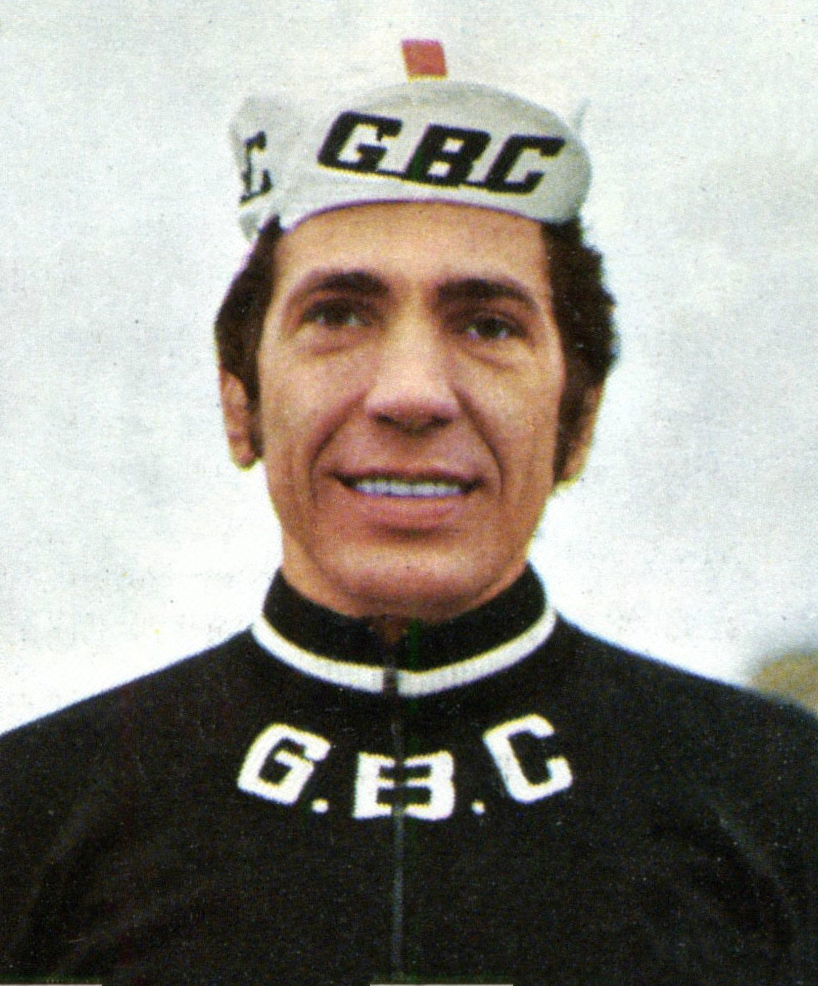
- Michelotto in 1972

Personal information
- Born: 31 October 1942 Trento, Italy
- Died: 27 May 2025 (aged 82)

Cycling career
- Sport: Cycling
- Discipline: Race
- Role: Rider

Professional teams
- 1966: Sanson
- 1967–1969: Max Meyer
- 1970–1971: Scic
- 1972: G.B.C.
- 1973: Bianchi–Campagnolo

Major wins
- Grand Tours Giro d'Italia Mountains Classification (1969) 1 Stage (1969)

Claudio Michelotto (31 October 1942 – 27 May 2025) was an Italian professional cyclist. The highlight of his career came with his victory in the Mountains Classification at the 1969 Giro d'Italia. Michelotto finished second overall in the 1969 Giro, his highest finish ever in the Giro d'Italia. He retired from cycling in 1973. Michelotto died on 27 May 2025, at the age of 82.

== Major results ==
1968
1st Overall Tirreno–Adriatico
1st Coppa Agostoni
3rd Giro del Ticino
3rd Giro dell'Emilia
1969
1st Overall Giro di Sardegna
1st Trofeo Laigueglia
1st Milano–Torino
2nd Overall Giro d'Italia

1st Mountains classification
1st Stage 21

1971
1st Giro di Campania
2nd Genova–Nizza
1972
1st Stage 4 Tour de Suisse
2nd Coppa Agostoni
