= Max Meyer (cycling team) =

Cycling team

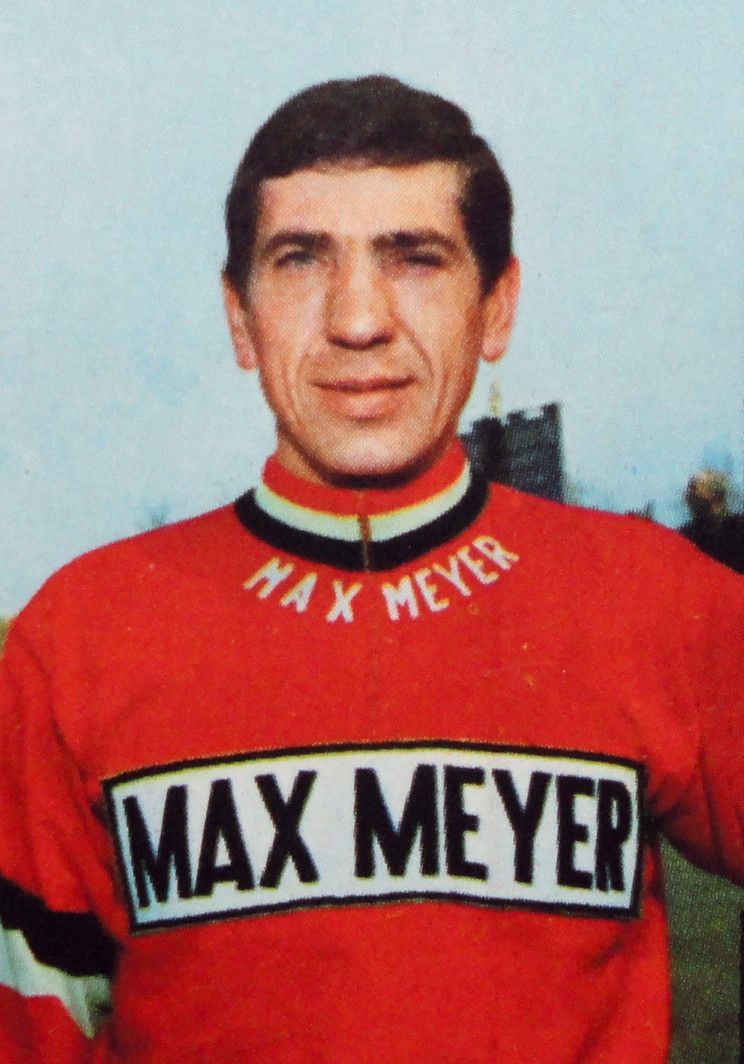
- Claudio Michelotto rode for Max Meyer

Team information
- Registered: Italy
- Founded: 1967
- Disbanded: 1969
- Discipline: Road

Team name history
- 1967–1969: Max Meyer

Max Meyer was an Italian professional cycling team that existed from 1967 to 1969.

== Major wins ==
1967
Giro del Veneto, Luciano Galbo
1968
Overall Tirreno–Adriatico, Claudio Michelotto
Coppa Agostoni, Claudio Michelotto
Gran Premio Industria e Commercio di Prato, Adriano Durante
1969
Overall Giro di Sardegna, Claudio Michelotto
Milano–Torino, Claudio Michelotto
Trofeo Laigueglia, Claudio Michelotto
