= Gilbert Bellone =

French cyclist (born 1942)

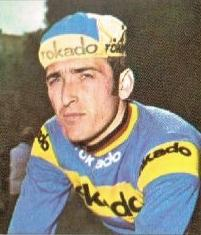
- Gilbert Bellone

Personal information
- Full name: Gilbert Bellone
- Born: 27 December 1942 (age 83) Grasse, France

Cycling career
- Sport: Cycling
- Discipline: Road
- Role: Rider

Major wins
- 1 stage 1968 Tour de France; Critérium International (1969)

Gilbert Bellone (born 27 December 1942 in Grasse) was a French professional road bicycle racer.

== Major results ==
1962
Grasse
1965
Saint-Vallier
1966
Guéret
Prix de Saint-Céré
Chateauneuf
Saint-Claud
1967
Toulon
Vuelta a España:

Winner stage 8

1968
Vailly-sur-Sauldre
Maurs
Ronde de Seignelay
Tour de France:

Winner stage 10

1969
Critérium International
GP de Cannes
Guingamp
1972
Bain-de-Bretagne
Rund um den Henninger-Turm
1973
Auray
