= Jorge Mariné =

Spanish cyclist (1941–2025)

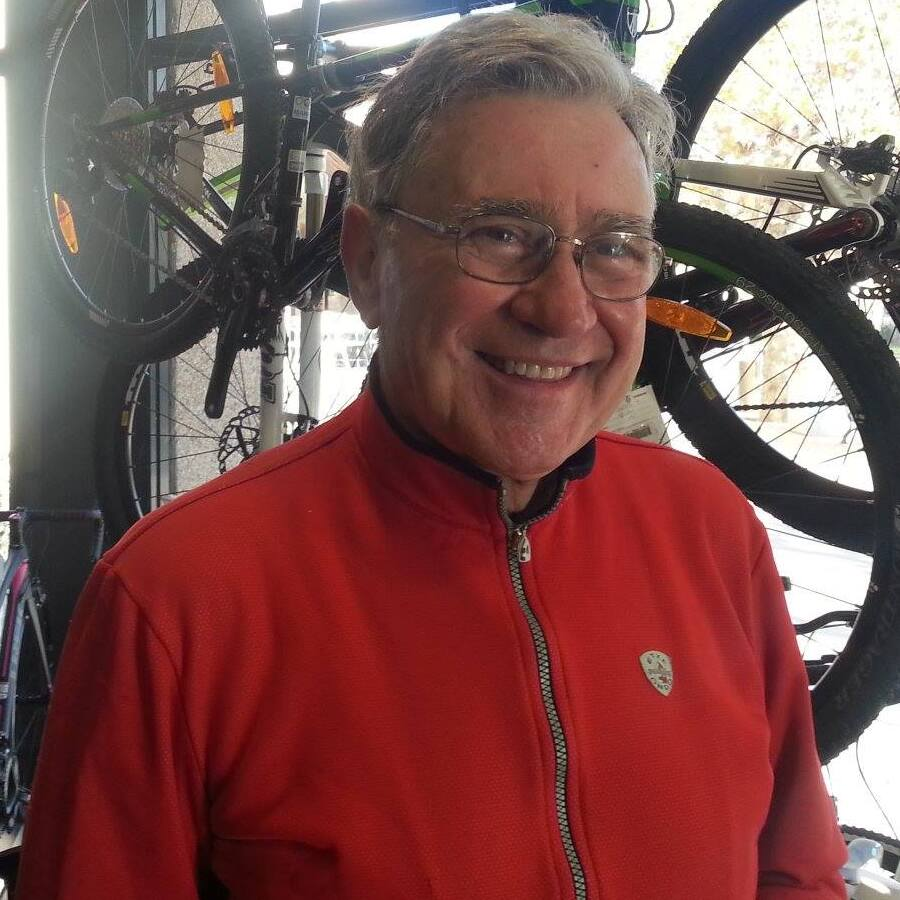
- Mariné in 2014

Personal information
- Born: 24 September 1941 Vinyols i els Arcs, Spain
- Died: 22 February 2025 (aged 83)

Cycling career
- Sport: Cycling

Jorge Mariné Tarés (24 September 1941 – 22 February 2025) was a Spanish cyclist. He competed in the individual road race at the 1964 Summer Olympics.

Mariné died on 22 February 2025, at the age of 83.
