= Raymond Steegmans =

Belgian cyclist

Personal information
- Born: 15 May 1945 (age 81) Hasselt, Belgium

Cycling career
- Sport: Cycling
- Current team: Retired
- Discipline: Road
- Role: Rider

Professional teams
- 1966: Goldor–Main d'Or
- 1967: Bic–Hutchinson
- 1968–1969: Goldor–Gerka–Main d'Or
- 1970–1971: Hertekamp–Magniflex
- 1972: Van Cauter–Magniflex–de Gribaldy
- 1973–1975: IJsboerke–Bertin

Raymond Steegmans (born 15 May 1945 in Hasselt) is a Belgian former cyclist. Professional from 1966 to 1974, he won the points classification and two stages of the 1969 Vuelta a España.

== Major results ==
1967
3rd Brussels–Ingooigem
1969
Vuelta a España

1st Points classification
1st Stages 5 & 14

1972
1st Grote 1-MeiPrijs
1st Stage 4B Tour de la Nouvelle France
1973
4th Le Samyn
1974
3rd Omloop der Vlaamse Ardennen
