= Michael Wright (cyclist) =

English cyclist (1941–2026)

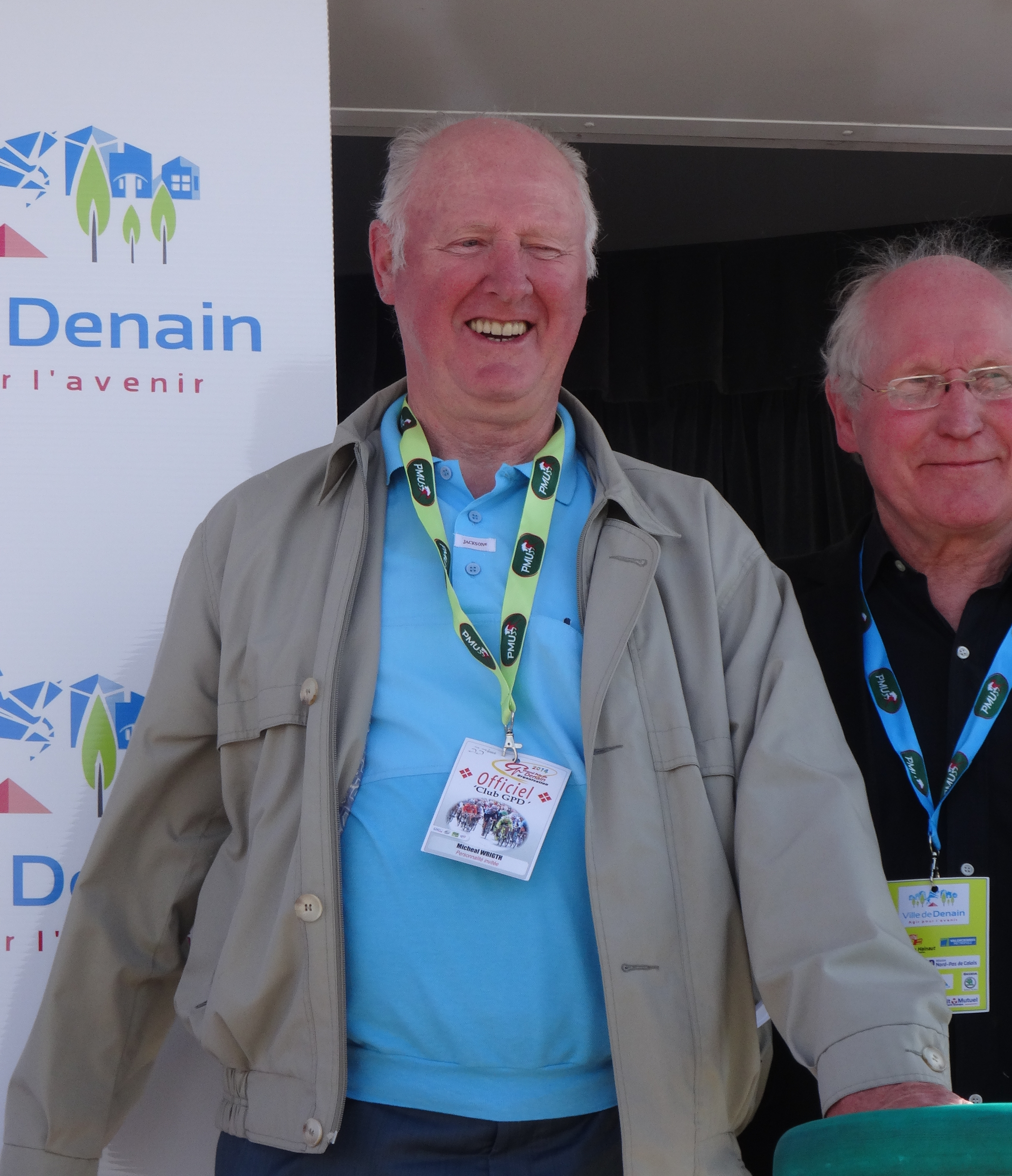

Personal information
- Full name: Michael Wright
- Nickname: Michel
- Born: 25 March 1941 Bishop's Stortford, Hertfordshire, England
- Died: 30 September 2026 (aged 85) Herstal, Liège Province, Belgium

Cycling career
- Sport: Cycling
- Discipline: Road
- Role: Rider

Professional team
- 1962–1967: Wiel's–Groene Leeuw
- 1968–1971: Bic
- 1972–1973: Gitane
- 1974: Sonolor–Gitane
- 1975: Gero–Hercka–Jaga
- 1976: IJsboerke–Colnago

Major wins
- Grand Tours Tour de France 3 individual stages (1965, 1967, 1973) Vuelta a España 4 individual stages (1968, 1969)

Michael Wright (25 March 1941 – 30 September 2026) was an English professional road bicycle racer from 1962 to 1976. He won stages in the Tour de France and the Vuelta a España stage races and represented Great Britain at several world championships.

== Early life ==
Wright was born in Bishop's Stortford, Hertfordshire on 25 March 1941. His father died in World War II and his mother remarried to a Belgian soldier. The family emigrated to Belgium when Wright was only three. He grew up in Liège.

Wright's first sport was football. However, when his stepfather died leaving the family short of money, Wright turned to cycling as a more lucrative way of exploiting his athletic talent.

His first language was French and, although he represented Great Britain at the Tour de France and several World road race championships, his English was limited. During the winter of 1967-8 he took evening classes to brush up his English in preparation for riding with the British team. In 2006, he told Procycling magazine that his English is poor.

He told Procycling that he profited from his British nationality because he was never good enough to ride in a Belgian national team. Being British gave him rides in world championships and, in 1967 and 1968, in the Tour de France (held in those years for national teams). He rode with a small Union Jack sewn to the sleeves of his jerseys.

When he stopped racing, he worked as a salesman for the IJsboerke ice-cream company, which briefly had a professional team of its own.

== Professional career ==
Wright was too big to ride well in the high mountains, but he was a fast finisher from a small group.

=== Tour de France ===
Wright rode the Tour de France eight times, finishing 24th in 1965 and winning three stages. Together with Barry Hoban, Wright provided Great Britain with its most consistent period of Tour stage wins during the late sixties and early seventies. He was a member of the British team in 1967 - the year that Tommy Simpson collapsed and died on Mont Ventoux.

=== Vuelta a España ===
Wright won 4 stages of the Vuelta a España: 2 in 1968 and 2 in 1969. In 1968 he was third in the points classification. In 1969 he came 5th on general classification, 2nd on the points classification and wore the leader's jersey for 2 days.

== Death ==
Wright died in Herstal, Liège Province, Belgium on 30 September 2026, aged 85.

== Major results ==
1962
1st Grand Prix du Brabant Wallon
9th Tour du Condroz
1963
1st Hoegaarden
2nd Omloop der Zennevallei
2nd Petegem-aan-de-Leie
1964
1st Grand Prix de Denain
1st Tour du Condroz
1st Stage 2 Tour du Nord
8th Rund um den Henninger Turm
9th Omloop van de Fruitstreek
1965
1st Hoeilaart–Diest–Hoeilaart
1st Stage 20 Tour de France
5th Liège–Bastogne–Liège
10th Gent–Wevelgem
1966
1st Bruxelles–Verviers
4th Rund um den Henninger Turm
6th Ronde van Limburg
7th Grand Prix Pino Cerami
1967
1st Stage 7 Tour de France
3rd Manx Trophy
6th Omloop Het Volk
1968
1st Flèche Hesbignonne
Vuelta a España

1st Stages 2 & 4
Held after Stage 4

5th Overall Tour de l'Oise
7th Omloop der Beide Vlaanderen
8th Overall Tour de Luxembourg

1st Stage 1a

1969
1st Tour du Condroz
Tour du Nord

1st Stages 1 & 4

1st Stage 1 Tour of the Basque Country
2nd Circuit des Onze Villes
5th Overall Vuelta a España

1st Stages 1b & 13
Held after Stages 1b & 2

8th Overall Grand Prix du Midi Libre
1970
1st Stage 3 Volta a Catalunya
5th Le Samyn
5th Trofeo Masferrer
1971
8th Druivenkoers Overijse
10th Hoeilaart–Diest–Hoeilaart
1972
7th Circuit du Tournaisis
8th Overall Tour d'Indre-et-Loire
1973
1st Stage 10 Tour de France
10th Brabantse Pijl
1974
1st Circuit du Port de Dunkerque
2nd Four Days of Dunkirk
3rd Druivenkoers Overijse
4th Circuit des Frontières
5th Grand Prix d'Isbergues
7th Tour du Condroz
1975
7th Grote Prijs Jef Scherens
7th Grand Prix Pino Cerami
9th Druivenkoers Overijse
9th Ronde van Limburg
1976
2nd Circuit du Tournaisis
8th Tour du Condroz

=== Grand Tour general classification results timeline ===
Grand Tour	1964	1965	1966	1967	1968	1969	1970	1971	1972	1973	1974
Vuelta a España	—	—	—	—	14	5	39	—	—	—	—
Giro d'Italia	Did not contest during career										
Tour de France	56	24	—	DNF	28	71	—	—	55	57	57

Legend
—	Did not compete
DNF	Did not finish

== Bibliography ==
Fotheringham, W. (2005), Roule Britannia: A History of Britons in the Tour de France, London: Yellow Jersey, ISBN 0-224-07425-3
