= Ramón Sáez =

Spanish cyclist

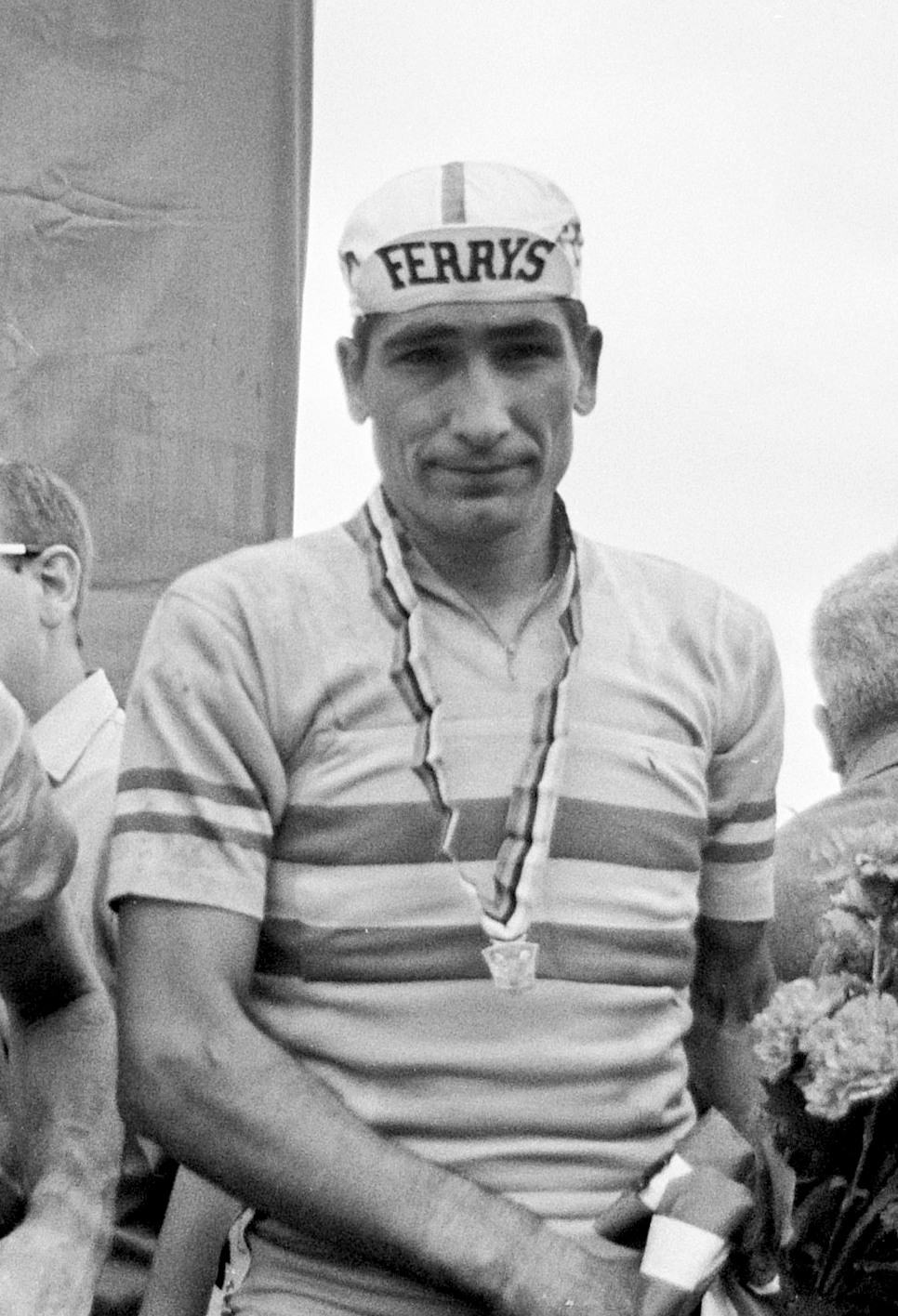
- Ramón Sáez Marzo at the 1967 road world championships

Personal information
- Born: 8 March 1940 Utiel, Spain
- Died: 18 June 2013 (aged 73) Valencia, Spain
- Height: 1.85 m (6 ft 1 in)
- Weight: 74 kg (163 lb)

Sport
- Sport: Cycling
Medal record
Representing Spain
UCI Road World Championships
Silver medal – second place	1964 Sallanches	Team time trial
Bronze medal – third place	1967 Heerlen	Road race

Ramón Sáez Marzo (8 March 1940 – 18 June 2013) was a Spanish road cyclist who was active between 1962 and 1973. He competed at the 1960 Summer Olympics in the 100 km team time trial and finished in eighth place. Four years later he won a silver medal in this event at the world championships. He won another world championships medal in 1967, in the road race; the same year he finished 85th in the Tour de France. His major road race victories are

- 1965: stages 11 and 13 of Volta a Portugal, stage 5 of Volta Ciclista a Catalunya, stage 5 of Vuelta a Mallorca
- 1967: stages 3 and 4 of Vuelta a España
- 1968: stage 5 of Vuelta a Andalucía, stage 11 of Vuelta a España
- 1969: stages 7 and 8 of Vuelta a España
- 1970: stages 8 and 15 of Vuelta a España, stages 3 and 7 of Vuelta a Aragón
