= 1969 Tour de France, Stage 11 to Stage 22b =

Cycling race stages

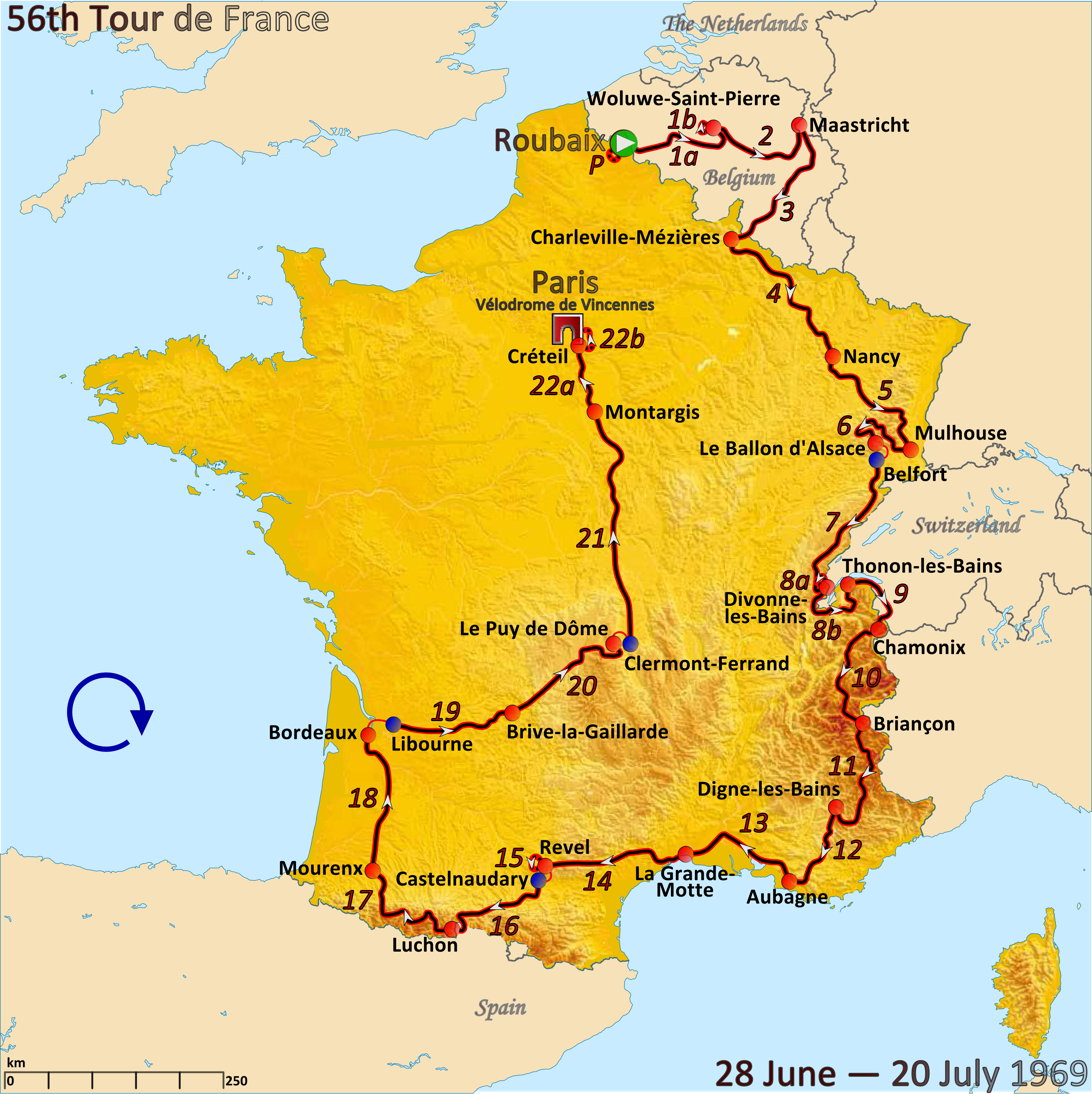
Route of the 1969 Tour de France

The 1969 Tour de France was the 56th edition of Tour de France, one of cycling's Grand Tours. The Tour began in Roubaix with a prologue individual time trial on July and Stage 11 occurred on 9 July with a mountainous stage from Briançon. The race finished in Paris on 20 July.

== Stage 11 ==
9 July 1969 - Briançon to Digne, 198 km (123.0 mi)

Stage 11 result

Rank	Rider	Team	Time
1	Eddy Merckx (BEL)	Faema	5h 58' 55"
2	Felice Gimondi (ITA)	Salvarani	s.t.
3	Gabriel Mascaró Febrer (ESP)	Kas–Kaskol	+ 22"
4	Roger Pingeon (FRA)	Peugeot–BP–Michelin	s.t.
5	Luis Pedro Santamarina (ESP)	Fagor	+ 23"
6	Joaquim Agostinho (POR)	Frimatic–de Gribaldy–Viva–Wolber	+ 2' 50"
7	Joaquim Galera (ESP)	Fagor	+ 2' 52"
8	Lucien Van Impe (BEL)	Sonolor–Lejeune	s.t.
9	Andrés Gandarias (ESP)	Kas–Kaskol	s.t.
10	Raymond Poulidor (FRA)	Mercier–BP–Hutchinson	s.t.

General classification after stage 11

Rank	Rider	Team	Time
1	Eddy Merckx (BEL)	Faema	53h 34' 20"
2	Roger Pingeon (FRA)	Peugeot–BP–Michelin	+ 5' 43"
3	Felice Gimondi (ITA)	Salvarani	+ 7' 29"
4	Raymond Poulidor (FRA)	Mercier–BP–Hutchinson	+ 9' 41"
5	Marinus Wagtmans (NED)	Willem II–Gazelle	+ 11' 35"
6	Andrés Gandarias (ESP)	Kas–Kaskol	+ 12' 16"
7	Pierfranco Vianelli (ITA)	Molteni	+ 14' 04"
8	Joaquim Galera (ESP)	Fagor	+ 18' 35"
9	Herman Van Springel (BEL)	Dr. Mann–Grundig	+ 21' 34"
10	Désiré Letort (FRA)	Peugeot–BP–Michelin	+ 23' 02"

== Stage 12 ==
10 July 1969 - Digne to Aubagne, 161 km (100.0 mi)

Stage 12 result

Rank	Rider	Team	Time
1	Felice Gimondi (ITA)	Salvarani	4h 23' 15"
2	Andrés Gandarias (ESP)	Kas–Kaskol	s.t.
3	Eddy Merckx (BEL)	Faema	s.t.
4	Victor Van Schil (BEL)	Faema	s.t.
5	Stéphane Abrahamian (FRA)	Sonolor–Lejeune	+ 1' 23"
6	Jaak De Boever (BEL)	Flandria–De Clerck–Krüger	s.t.
7	Raymond Poulidor (FRA)	Mercier–BP–Hutchinson	s.t.
8	Joaquim Agostinho (POR)	Frimatic–de Gribaldy–Viva–Wolber	s.t.
9	Lucien Van Impe (BEL)	Sonolor–Lejeune	s.t.
10	Herman Van Springel (BEL)	Dr. Mann–Grundig	s.t.

General classification after stage 12

Rank	Rider	Team	Time
1	Eddy Merckx (BEL)	Faema	57h 57' 30"
2	Roger Pingeon (FRA)	Peugeot–BP–Michelin	+ 7' 11"
3	Felice Gimondi (ITA)	Salvarani	+ 7' 14"
4	Raymond Poulidor (FRA)	Mercier–BP–Hutchinson	+ 11' 09"
5	Andrés Gandarias (ESP)	Kas–Kaskol	+ 12' 11"
6	Marinus Wagtmans (NED)	Willem II–Gazelle	+ 13' 35"
7	Pierfranco Vianelli (ITA)	Molteni	+ 16' 50"
8	Joaquim Galera (ESP)	Fagor	+ 21' 21"
9	Herman Van Springel (BEL)	Dr. Mann–Grundig	+ 23' 02"
10	Désiré Letort (FRA)	Peugeot–BP–Michelin	+ 25' 02"

== Stage 13 ==
11 July 1969 - Aubagne to La Grande-Motte, 196 km (122 mi)

Stage 13 result

Rank	Rider	Team	Time
1	Guido Reybrouck (BEL)	Faema	5h 48' 54"
2	Jan Janssen (NED)	Bic	s.t.
3	Eric Leman (BEL)	Flandria–De Clerck–Krüger	s.t.
4	Harm Ottenbros (NED)	Willem II–Gazelle	s.t.
5	Michele Dancelli (ITA)	Molteni	s.t.
6	Dino Zandegù (ITA)	Salvarani	s.t.
7	Gerben Karstens (NED)	Peugeot–BP–Michelin	s.t.
8	Roland Berland (FRA)	Bic	s.t.
9	Nemesio Jiménez (ESP)	Kas–Kaskol	s.t.
10	Eddy Beugels (NED)	Mercier–BP–Hutchinson	s.t.

General classification after stage 13

Rank	Rider	Team	Time
1	Eddy Merckx (BEL)	Faema	63h 51' 04"
2	Roger Pingeon (FRA)	Peugeot–BP–Michelin	+ 7' 11"
3	Felice Gimondi (ITA)	Salvarani	+ 7' 14"
4	Raymond Poulidor (FRA)	Mercier–BP–Hutchinson	+ 11' 09"
5	Andrés Gandarias (ESP)	Kas–Kaskol	+ 12' 11"
6	Marinus Wagtmans (NED)	Willem II–Gazelle	+ 13' 35"
7	Pierfranco Vianelli (ITA)	Molteni	+ 16' 50"
8	Herman Van Springel (BEL)	Dr. Mann–Grundig	+ 18' 22"
9	Edy Schütz (LUX)	Molteni	+ 20' 29"
10	Joaquim Galera (ESP)	Fagor	+ 21' 21"

== Stage 14 ==
12 July 1969 - La Grande-Motte to Revel, 234 km (145 mi)

Stage 14 result

Rank	Rider	Team	Time
1	Joaquim Agostinho (POR)	Frimatic–de Gribaldy–Viva–Wolber	6h 59' 53"
2	Eddy Beugels (NED)	Mercier–BP–Hutchinson	+ 1' 18"
3	Wilfried David (BEL)	Flandria–De Clerck–Krüger	s.t.
4	Eric Leman (BEL)	Flandria–De Clerck–Krüger	+ 2' 14"
5	Dino Zandegù (ITA)	Salvarani	s.t.
6	Marinus Wagtmans (NED)	Willem II–Gazelle	s.t.
7	Harm Ottenbros (NED)	Willem II–Gazelle	s.t.
8	Gerben Karstens (NED)	Peugeot–BP–Michelin	s.t.
9	Jan Janssen (NED)	Bic	s.t.
10	Michele Dancelli (ITA)	Molteni	s.t.

General classification after stage 14

Rank	Rider	Team	Time
1	Eddy Merckx (BEL)	Faema	70h 53' 11"
2	Roger Pingeon (FRA)	Peugeot–BP–Michelin	+ 7' 11"
3	Felice Gimondi (ITA)	Salvarani	+ 7' 14"
4	Raymond Poulidor (FRA)	Mercier–BP–Hutchinson	+ 11' 09"
5	Andrés Gandarias (ESP)	Kas–Kaskol	+ 12' 11"
6	Marinus Wagtmans (NED)	Willem II–Gazelle	+ 13' 35"
7	Pierfranco Vianelli (ITA)	Molteni	+ 16' 50"
8	Herman Van Springel (BEL)	Dr. Mann–Grundig	+ 18' 22"
9	Edy Schütz (LUX)	Molteni	+ 20' 29"
10	Joaquim Galera (ESP)	Fagor	+ 21' 21"

== Stage 15 ==
13 July 1969 - Revel, 19 km (12 mi) (ITT)

Stage 15 result

Rank	Rider	Team	Time
1	Eddy Merckx (BEL)	Faema	24' 08"
2	Roger Pingeon (FRA)	Peugeot–BP–Michelin	+ 52"
3	Raymond Poulidor (FRA)	Mercier–BP–Hutchinson	+ 55"
4	Rudi Altig (FRG)	Salvarani	+ 59"
5	Marinus Wagtmans (NED)	Willem II–Gazelle	+ 1' 03"
6	Joaquim Agostinho (POR)	Frimatic–de Gribaldy–Viva–Wolber	+ 1' 28"
7	Pierfranco Vianelli (ITA)	Molteni	+ 1' 29"
8	Felice Gimondi (ITA)	Salvarani	+ 1' 33"
9	Edy Schütz (LUX)	Molteni	+ 1' 34"
10	Herman Van Springel (BEL)	Dr. Mann–Grundig	+ 1' 41"

General classification after stage 15

Rank	Rider	Team	Time
1	Eddy Merckx (BEL)	Faema	71h 17' 19"
2	Roger Pingeon (FRA)	Peugeot–BP–Michelin	+ 8' 03"
3	Felice Gimondi (ITA)	Salvarani	+ 8' 47"
4	Raymond Poulidor (FRA)	Mercier–BP–Hutchinson	+ 12' 04"
5	Andrés Gandarias (ESP)	Kas–Kaskol	+ 13' 53"
6	Marinus Wagtmans (NED)	Willem II–Gazelle	+ 14' 38"
7	Pierfranco Vianelli (ITA)	Molteni	+ 18' 19"
8	Herman Van Springel (BEL)	Dr. Mann–Grundig	+ 20' 03"
9	Edy Schütz (LUX)	Molteni	+ 22' 03"
10	Joaquim Galera (ESP)	Fagor	+ 23' 55"

== Stage 16 ==
14 July 1969 - Castelnaudary to Luchon, 199 km (124 mi)

Stage 16 result

Rank	Rider	Team	Time
1	Raymond Delisle (FRA)	Peugeot–BP–Michelin	6h 13' 21"
2	Jan Janssen (NED)	Bic	+ 23"
3	Wladimiro Panizza (ITA)	Salvarani	+ 24"
4	Eddy Merckx (BEL)	Faema	+ 2' 45"
5	Roger Pingeon (FRA)	Peugeot–BP–Michelin	+ 3' 03"
6	José Antonio Momeñe (ESP)	Fagor	+ 3' 27"
7	Gabriel Mascaró Febrer (ESP)	Kas–Kaskol	s.t.
8	Joaquim Agostinho (POR)	Frimatic–de Gribaldy–Viva–Wolber	s.t.
9	Felice Gimondi (ITA)	Salvarani	s.t.
10	André Bayssière (FRA)	Peugeot–BP–Michelin	s.t.

General classification after stage 16

Rank	Rider	Team	Time
1	Eddy Merckx (BEL)	Faema	77h 33' 25"
2	Roger Pingeon (FRA)	Peugeot–BP–Michelin	+ 8' 21"
3	Felice Gimondi (ITA)	Salvarani	+ 9' 29"
4	Raymond Poulidor (FRA)	Mercier–BP–Hutchinson	+ 12' 46"
5	Andrés Gandarias (ESP)	Kas–Kaskol	+ 14' 46"
6	Marinus Wagtmans (NED)	Willem II–Gazelle	+ 16' 02"
7	Pierfranco Vianelli (ITA)	Molteni	+ 20' 33"
8	Joaquim Galera (ESP)	Fagor	+ 26' 09"
9	Wladimiro Panizza (ITA)	Salvarani	+ 28' 40"
10	Edy Schütz (LUX)	Molteni	+ 30' 17"

== Stage 17 ==
15 July 1969 - Luchon to Mourenx, 214 km (133 mi)

Stage 17 result

Rank	Rider	Team	Time
1	Eddy Merckx (BEL)	Faema	7h 04' 28"
2	Michele Dancelli (ITA)	Molteni	+ 7' 56"
3	Martin Van Den Bossche (BEL)	Faema	+ 7' 57"
4	André Bayssière (FRA)	Peugeot–BP–Michelin	s.t.
5	Roger Pingeon (FRA)	Peugeot–BP–Michelin	s.t.
6	Jean-Claude Theillière (FRA)	Sonolor–Lejeune	s.t.
7	André Zimmermann (FRA)	Sonolor–Lejeune	s.t.
8	Raymond Poulidor (FRA)	Mercier–BP–Hutchinson	s.t.
9	Jan Janssen (NED)	Bic	+ 14' 47"
10	Marinus Wagtmans (NED)	Willem II–Gazelle	+ 14' 48"

General classification after stage 17

Rank	Rider	Team	Time
1	Eddy Merckx (BEL)	Faema	84h 37' 53"
2	Roger Pingeon (FRA)	Peugeot–BP–Michelin	+ 16' 18"
3	Raymond Poulidor (FRA)	Mercier–BP–Hutchinson	+ 20' 43"
4	Felice Gimondi (ITA)	Salvarani	+ 24' 18"
5	Andrés Gandarias (ESP)	Kas–Kaskol	+ 29' 35"
6	Marinus Wagtmans (NED)	Willem II–Gazelle	+ 30' 50"
7	Pierfranco Vianelli (ITA)	Molteni	+ 35' 22"
8	Désiré Letort (FRA)	Peugeot–BP–Michelin	+ 45' 47"
9	Joaquim Agostinho (POR)	Frimatic–de Gribaldy–Viva–Wolber	+ 46' 58"
10	Jan Janssen (NED)	Bic	+ 48' 53"

== Stage 18 ==
16 July 1969 - Mourenx to Bordeaux, 201 km (125 mi)

Stage 18 result

Rank	Rider	Team	Time
1	Barry Hoban (GBR)	Mercier–BP–Hutchinson	5h 44' 43"
2	Harm Ottenbros (NED)	Willem II–Gazelle	s.t.
3	Pietro Guerra (ITA)	Salvarani	s.t.
4	Roland Berland (FRA)	Bic	s.t.
5	Francis Rigon (FRA)	Frimatic–de Gribaldy–Viva–Wolber	s.t.
6	Guido Reybrouck (BEL)	Faema	+ 52"
7	Dino Zandegù (ITA)	Salvarani	s.t.
8	Marinus Wagtmans (NED)	Willem II–Gazelle	s.t.
9	Gerben Karstens (NED)	Peugeot–BP–Michelin	s.t.
10	Eric Leman (BEL)	Flandria–De Clerck–Krüger	s.t.

General classification after stage 18

Rank	Rider	Team	Time
1	Eddy Merckx (BEL)	Faema	90h 23' 28"
2	Roger Pingeon (FRA)	Peugeot–BP–Michelin	+ 16' 18"
3	Raymond Poulidor (FRA)	Mercier–BP–Hutchinson	+ 20' 43"
4	Felice Gimondi (ITA)	Salvarani	+ 24' 18"
5	Andrés Gandarias (ESP)	Kas–Kaskol	+ 29' 35"
6	Marinus Wagtmans (NED)	Willem II–Gazelle	+ 30' 50"
7	Pierfranco Vianelli (ITA)	Molteni	+ 35' 22"
8	Désiré Letort (FRA)	Peugeot–BP–Michelin	+ 45' 47"
9	Joaquim Agostinho (POR)	Frimatic–de Gribaldy–Viva–Wolber	+ 46' 58"
10	Jan Janssen (NED)	Bic	+ 48' 53"

== Stage 19 ==
17 July 1969 - Bordeaux to Brive, 193 km (120 mi)

Stage 19 result

Rank	Rider	Team	Time
1	Barry Hoban (GBR)	Mercier–BP–Hutchinson	5h 30' 57"
2	Evert Dolman (NED)	Willem II–Gazelle	s.t.
3	Pietro Guerra (ITA)	Salvarani	s.t.
4	Jozef Spruyt (BEL)	Faema	s.t.
5	Edy Schütz (LUX)	Molteni	s.t.
6	Eric Leman (BEL)	Flandria–De Clerck–Krüger	+ 1' 21"
7	Guido Reybrouck (BEL)	Faema	s.t.
8	Jules Van Der Flaas (BEL)	Willem II–Gazelle	s.t.
9	Georges Vandenberghe (BEL)	Faema	s.t.
10	Harm Ottenbros (NED)	Willem II–Gazelle	s.t.

General classification after stage 19

Rank	Rider	Team	Time
1	Eddy Merckx (BEL)	Faema	95h 55' 54"
2	Roger Pingeon (FRA)	Peugeot–BP–Michelin	+ 16' 18"
3	Raymond Poulidor (FRA)	Mercier–BP–Hutchinson	+ 20' 43"
4	Felice Gimondi (ITA)	Salvarani	+ 24' 18"
5	Andrés Gandarias (ESP)	Kas–Kaskol	+ 29' 27"
6	Marinus Wagtmans (NED)	Willem II–Gazelle	+ 30' 42"
7	Pierfranco Vianelli (ITA)	Molteni	+ 35' 22"
8	Désiré Letort (FRA)	Peugeot–BP–Michelin	+ 45' 47"
9	Joaquim Agostinho (POR)	Frimatic–de Gribaldy–Viva–Wolber	+ 46' 50"
10	Jan Janssen (NED)	Bic	+ 48' 50"

== Stage 20 ==
18 July 1969 - Brive to Puy de Dôme, 198 km (123 mi)

Stage 20 result

Rank	Rider	Team	Time
1	Pierre Matignon (FRA)	Frimatic–de Gribaldy–Viva–Wolber	6h 49' 54"
2	Eddy Merckx (BEL)	Faema	+ 1' 25"
3	Paul Gutty (FRA)	Frimatic–de Gribaldy–Viva–Wolber	+ 1' 30"
4	Martin Van Den Bossche (BEL)	Faema	+ 1' 47"
5	Roger Pingeon (FRA)	Peugeot–BP–Michelin	s.t.
6	Raymond Poulidor (FRA)	Mercier–BP–Hutchinson	+ 2' 02"
7	Andrés Gandarias (ESP)	Kas–Kaskol	+ 2' 05"
8	Wladimiro Panizza (ITA)	Salvarani	+ 2' 31"
9	Jan Janssen (NED)	Bic	+ 2' 39"
10	Lucien Van Impe (BEL)	Sonolor–Lejeune	s.t.

General classification after stage 20

Rank	Rider	Team	Time
1	Eddy Merckx (BEL)	Faema	102h 47' 13"
2	Roger Pingeon (FRA)	Peugeot–BP–Michelin	+ 16' 40"
3	Raymond Poulidor (FRA)	Mercier–BP–Hutchinson	+ 21' 20"
4	Felice Gimondi (ITA)	Salvarani	+ 26' 31"
5	Andrés Gandarias (ESP)	Kas–Kaskol	+ 30' 07"
6	Marinus Wagtmans (NED)	Willem II–Gazelle	+ 32' 29"
7	Pierfranco Vianelli (ITA)	Molteni	+ 38' 35"
8	Joaquim Agostinho (POR)	Frimatic–de Gribaldy–Viva–Wolber	+ 48' 04"
9	Désiré Letort (FRA)	Peugeot–BP–Michelin	+ 48' 07"
10	Jan Janssen (NED)	Bic	+ 49' 49"

== Stage 21 ==
19 July 1969 - Clermont-Ferrand to Montargis, 329 km (204 mi)

Stage 21 result

Rank	Rider	Team	Time
1	Herman Van Springel (BEL)	Dr. Mann–Grundig	9h 37' 47"
2	Harm Ottenbros (NED)	Willem II–Gazelle	s.t.
3	Giacinto Santambrogio (ITA)	Molteni	s.t.
4	Lucien Aimar (FRA)	Bic	s.t.
5	Giancarlo Ferretti (ITA)	Salvarani	s.t.
6	Roland Berland (FRA)	Bic	s.t.
7	Bernard Guyot (FRA)	Sonolor–Lejeune	s.t.
8	Manuel Galera (ESP)	Fagor	s.t.
9	Joaquim Galera (ESP)	Fagor	s.t.
10	Wladimiro Panizza (ITA)	Salvarani	s.t.

General classification after stage 21

Rank	Rider	Team	Time
1	Eddy Merckx (BEL)	Faema	112h 26' 28"
2	Roger Pingeon (FRA)	Peugeot–BP–Michelin	+ 16' 40"
3	Raymond Poulidor (FRA)	Mercier–BP–Hutchinson	+ 21' 20"
4	Felice Gimondi (ITA)	Salvarani	+ 26' 31"
5	Andrés Gandarias (ESP)	Kas–Kaskol	+ 30' 07"
6	Marinus Wagtmans (NED)	Willem II–Gazelle	+ 32' 29"
7	Pierfranco Vianelli (ITA)	Molteni	+ 38' 35"
8	Joaquim Agostinho (POR)	Frimatic–de Gribaldy–Viva–Wolber	+ 48' 04"
9	Désiré Letort (FRA)	Peugeot–BP–Michelin	+ 48' 07"
10	Jan Janssen (NED)	Bic	+ 49' 49"

== Stage 22a ==
20 July 1969 - Montargis to Créteil, 111 km (69 mi)

Stage 22a result

Rank	Rider	Team	Time
1	Jozef Spruyt (BEL)	Faema	2h 56' 18"
2	Georges Vandenberghe (BEL)	Faema	+ 8"
3	Gerben Karstens (NED)	Peugeot–BP–Michelin	s.t.
4	Evert Dolman (NED)	Willem II–Gazelle	s.t.
5	Wilfried Peffgen (FRG)	Salvarani	s.t.
6	Roland Berland (FRA)	Bic	s.t.
7	Raymond Riotte (FRA)	Mercier–BP–Hutchinson	+ 1' 42"
8	Francisco Gabica (ESP)	Fagor	s.t.
9	Maurice Izier (FRA)	Frimatic–de Gribaldy–Viva–Wolber	s.t.
10	Eduardo Castelló (ESP)	Kas–Kaskol	s.t.

General classification after stage 22a

Rank	Rider	Team	Time
1	Eddy Merckx (BEL)	Faema	115h 28' 23"
2	Roger Pingeon (FRA)	Peugeot–BP–Michelin	+ 16' 40"
3	Raymond Poulidor (FRA)	Mercier–BP–Hutchinson	+ 21' 20"
4	Felice Gimondi (ITA)	Salvarani	+ 26' 31"
5	Andrés Gandarias (ESP)	Kas–Kaskol	+ 30' 07"
6	Marinus Wagtmans (NED)	Willem II–Gazelle	+ 32' 29"
7	Pierfranco Vianelli (ITA)	Molteni	+ 38' 35"
8	Joaquim Agostinho (POR)	Frimatic–de Gribaldy–Viva–Wolber	+ 48' 04"
9	Désiré Letort (FRA)	Peugeot–BP–Michelin	+ 48' 07"
10	Jan Janssen (NED)	Bic	+ 49' 49"

== Stage 22b ==
20 July 1969 - Créteil to Paris, 37 km (23 mi) (ITT)

Stage 22b result

Rank	Rider	Team	Time
1	Eddy Merckx (BEL)	Faema	47' 38"
2	Raymond Poulidor (FRA)	Mercier–BP–Hutchinson	+ 53"
3	Roger Pingeon (FRA)	Peugeot–BP–Michelin	+ 1' 14"
4	Marinus Wagtmans (NED)	Willem II–Gazelle	+ 1' 28"
5	Felice Gimondi (ITA)	Salvarani	2' 53"
6	Julien Stevens (BEL)	Faema	+ 2' 55"
7	Andrés Gandarias (ESP)	Kas–Kaskol	+ 2' 57"
8	Jan Janssen (NED)	Bic	+ 3' 07"
9	Joaquim Agostinho (POR)	Frimatic–de Gribaldy–Viva–Wolber	+ 3' 20"
10	Ferdinand Bracke (BEL)	Peugeot–BP–Michelin	+ 3' 33"

General classification after stage 22b

Rank	Rider	Team	Time
1	Eddy Merckx (BEL)	Faema	116h 16' 02"
2	Roger Pingeon (FRA)	Peugeot–BP–Michelin	+ 17' 54"
3	Raymond Poulidor (FRA)	Mercier–BP–Hutchinson	+ 22' 13"
4	Felice Gimondi (ITA)	Salvarani	+ 29' 24"
5	Andrés Gandarias (ESP)	Kas–Kaskol	+ 33' 04"
6	Marinus Wagtmans (NED)	Willem II–Gazelle	+ 33' 57"
7	Pierfranco Vianelli (ITA)	Molteni	+ 42' 40"
8	Joaquim Agostinho (POR)	Frimatic–de Gribaldy–Viva–Wolber	+ 51' 24"
9	Désiré Letort (FRA)	Peugeot–BP–Michelin	+ 51' 41"
10	Jan Janssen (NED)	Bic	+ 52' 56"
