= 1969 Tour de France, Prologue to Stage 10 =

Cycling race stages

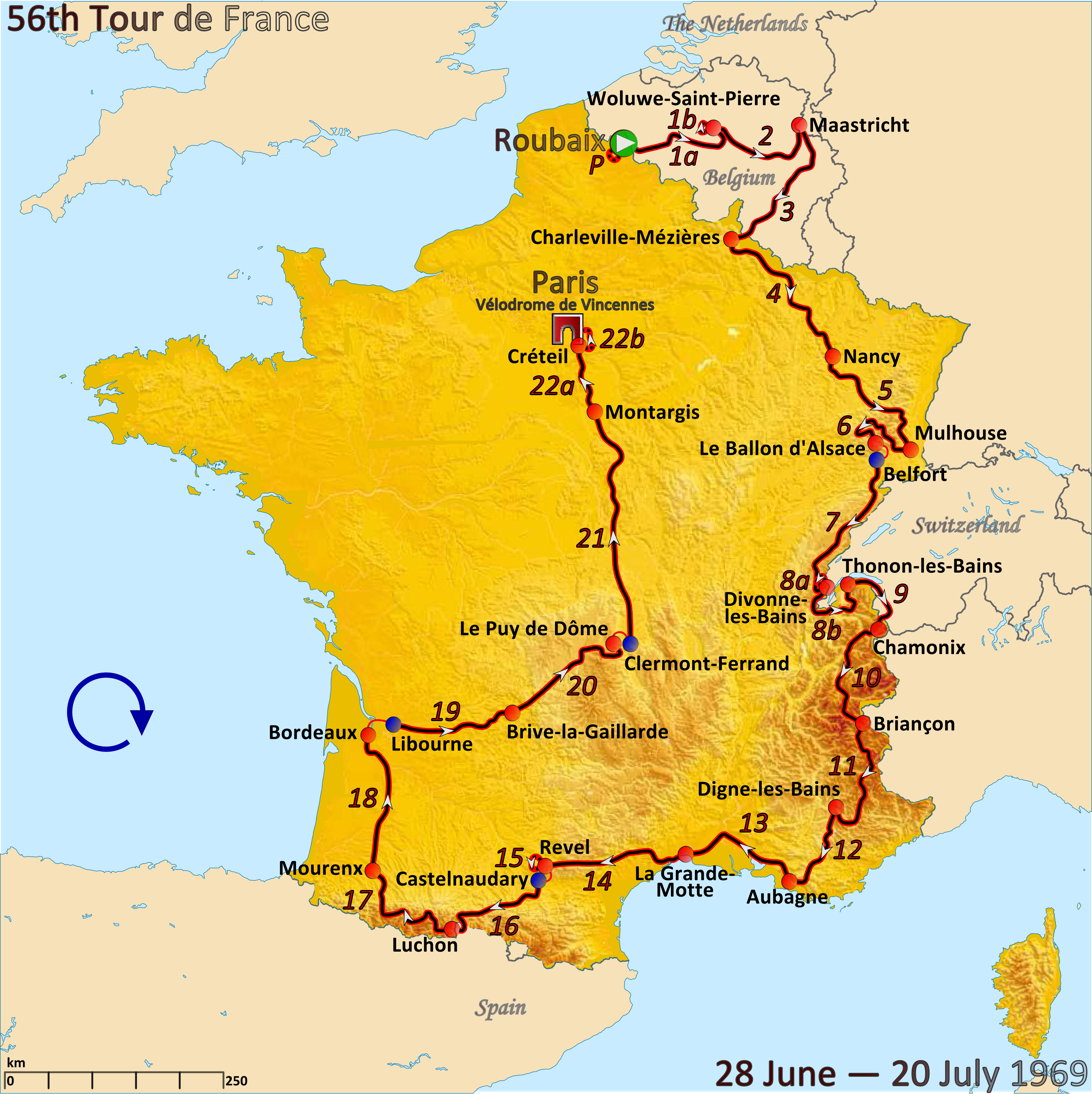
Route of the 1969 Tour de France

The 1969 Tour de France was the 56th edition of Tour de France, one of cycling's Grand Tours. The Tour began in Roubaix with a prologue individual time trial on 28 June and Stage 10 occurred on 8 July with a mountainous stage to Briançon. The race finished in Paris on 20 July.

== Prologue ==
28 June 1969 - Roubaix, 10 km (6.2 mi) (ITT)

Prologue result and General Classification after Prologue

	Rider	Team	Time
1	Rudi Altig (FRG)	Salvarani	13' 00"
2	Eddy Merckx (BEL)	Faema	+ 7"
3	Charly Grosskost (FRA)	Bic	+ 17"
4	Ferdinand Bracke (BEL)	Peugeot–BP–Michelin	+ 18"
5	Felice Gimondi (ITA)	Salvarani	+ 21"
6	Raymond Poulidor (FRA)	Mercier–BP–Hutchinson	+ 22"
7	Pierfranco Vianelli (ITA)	Molteni	s.t.
8	Edy Schütz (LUX)	Molteni	+ 24"
9	Jan Janssen (NED)	Bic	+ 27"
10	Roger Rosiers (BEL)	Dr. Mann–Grundig	+ 31"

== Stage 1a ==
29 June 1969 - Roubaix to Woluwe-Saint-Pierre, 147 km (91.3 mi)

Stage 1a result

Rank	Rider	Team	Time
1	Marino Basso (ITA)	Molteni	3h 18' 29"
2	Jan Janssen (NED)	Bic	s.t.
3	Roger De Vlaeminck (BEL)	Flandria–De Clerck–Krüger	s.t.
4	Pieter Nassen (BEL)	Flandria–De Clerck–Krüger	s.t.
5	Eddy Merckx (BEL)	Faema	s.t.
6	Marinus Wagtmans (NED)	Willem II–Gazelle	s.t.
7	Guido Reybrouck (BEL)	Faema	s.t.
8	José Samyn (FRA)	Bic	s.t.
9	Harm Ottenbros (NED)	Willem II–Gazelle	s.t.
10	René Pijnen (NED)	Willem II–Gazelle	s.t.

General classification after stage 1a

Rank	Rider	Team	Time
1	Rudi Altig (FRG)	Salvarani	3h 31' 29"
2	Eddy Merckx (BEL)	Faema	+ 7"
3	Jan Janssen (NED)	Bic	+ 17"
4	Charly Grosskost (FRA)	Bic	s.t.
5	Ferdinand Bracke (BEL)	Peugeot–BP–Michelin	+ 18"
6	Felice Gimondi (ITA)	Salvarani	+ 21"
7	Raymond Poulidor (FRA)	Mercier–BP–Hutchinson	+ 22"
8	Pierfranco Vianelli (ITA)	Molteni	s.t.
9	Edy Schütz (LUX)	Molteni	+ 24"
10	Roger Rosiers (BEL)	Dr. Mann–Grundig	+ 31"

== Stage 1b ==
29 June 1969 - Woluwe-Saint-Pierre , 16 km (9.9 mi) (TTT)

Stage 1b result

Rank	Team	Time
1	Faema	1h 37' 45"
2	Bic	+ 45"
3	Salvarani	s.t.
4	Dr. Mann–Grundig	+ 1' 35"
5	Peugeot–BP–Michelin	+ 2' 10"
6	Mercier–BP–Hutchinson	+ 3' 20"
7	Kas–Kaskol	+ 4' 00"
8	Molteni	s.t.
9	Frimatic–de Gribaldy–Viva–Wolber	+ 4' 05"
10	Flandria–De Clerck–Krüger	+ 4' 20"

General classification after stage 1b

Rank	Rider	Team	Time
1	Eddy Merckx (BEL)	Faema	3h 31' 16"
2	Rudi Altig (FRG)	Salvarani	+ 8"
3	Jan Janssen (NED)	Bic	+ 20"
4	Charly Grosskost (FRA)	Bic	s.t.
5	Julien Stevens (BEL)	Faema	+ 24"
6	Felice Gimondi (ITA)	Salvarani	+ 29"
7	Ferdinand Bracke (BEL)	Peugeot–BP–Michelin	+ 31"
8	Raymond Poulidor (FRA)	Mercier–BP–Hutchinson	+ 35"
9	Pierfranco Vianelli (ITA)	Molteni	s.t.
10	Edy Schütz (LUX)	Molteni	+ 37"

== Stage 2 ==
30 June 1969 - Woluwe-Saint-Pierre to Maastricht, 182 km (113.1 mi)

Stage 2 result

Rank	Rider	Team	Time
1	Julien Stevens (BEL)	Faema	4h 35' 42"
2	Willy In 't Ven (BEL)	Dr. Mann–Grundig	s.t.
3	Derek Harrison (GBR)	Frimatic–de Gribaldy–Viva–Wolber	+ 1"
4	Franco Balmamion (ITA)	Salvarani	+ 2"
5	Michael Wright (GBR)	Bic	+ 14"
6	Harm Ottenbros (NED)	Willem II–Gazelle	+ 16"
7	Marino Basso (ITA)	Molteni	s.t.
8	Christian Raymond (FRA)	Peugeot–BP–Michelin	s.t.
9	Pieter Nassen (BEL)	Flandria–De Clerck–Krüger	s.t.
10	Jan Janssen (NED)	Bic	s.t.

General classification after stage 2

Rank	Rider	Team	Time
1	Julien Stevens (BEL)	Faema	8h 07' 02"
2	Eddy Merckx (BEL)	Faema	+ 12"
3	Rudi Altig (FRG)	Salvarani	+ 20"
4	Jan Janssen (NED)	Bic	+ 32"
5	Charly Grosskost (FRA)	Bic	s.t.
6	Felice Gimondi (ITA)	Salvarani	+ 41"
7	Ferdinand Bracke (BEL)	Peugeot–BP–Michelin	+ 43"
8	Raymond Poulidor (FRA)	Mercier–BP–Hutchinson	+ 47"
9	Pierfranco Vianelli (ITA)	Molteni	s.t.
10	Edy Schütz (LUX)	Molteni	+ 49"

== Stage 3 ==
1 July 1969 - Maastricht to Charleville-Mézières, 213 km (132 mi)

Stage 3 result

Rank	Rider	Team	Time
1	Eric Leman (BEL)	Flandria–De Clerck–Krüger	5h 56' 15"
2	Marino Basso (ITA)	Molteni	s.t.
3	Michele Dancelli (ITA)	Molteni	s.t.
4	Dino Zandegù (ITA)	Salvarani	s.t.
5	Pieter Nassen (BEL)	Flandria–De Clerck–Krüger	s.t.
6	Jan Janssen (NED)	Bic	s.t.
7	Rik Van Looy (BEL)	Willem II–Gazelle	s.t.
8	Roger De Vlaeminck (BEL)	Flandria–De Clerck–Krüger	s.t.
9	Gilbert Bellone (FRA)	Bic	s.t.
10	José Manuel López (ESP)	Fagor	s.t.

General classification after stage 3

Rank	Rider	Team	Time
1	Julien Stevens (BEL)	Faema	14h 03' 17"
2	Eddy Merckx (BEL)	Faema	+ 12"
3	Rudi Altig (FRG)	Salvarani	+ 20"
4	Jan Janssen (NED)	Bic	+ 32"
5	Charly Grosskost (FRA)	Bic	s.t.
6	Felice Gimondi (ITA)	Salvarani	+ 41"
7	Ferdinand Bracke (BEL)	Peugeot–BP–Michelin	+ 43"
8	Raymond Poulidor (FRA)	Mercier–BP–Hutchinson	+ 47"
9	Pierfranco Vianelli (ITA)	Molteni	s.t.
10	Edy Schütz (LUX)	Molteni	+ 49"

== Stage 4 ==
2 July 1969 - Charleville-Mézières to Nancy, 214 km (133 mi)

Stage 4 result

Rank	Rider	Team	Time
1	Rik Van Looy (BEL)	Willem II–Gazelle	5h 18' 02"
2	Julien Stevens (BEL)	Faema	+ 42"
3	Dino Zandegù (ITA)	Salvarani	+ 44"
4	Frans Mintjens (BEL)	Faema	s.t.
5	Désiré Letort (FRA)	Peugeot–BP–Michelin	s.t.
6	José Pérez Francés (ESP)	Bic	s.t.
7	Roland Berland (FRA)	Bic	s.t.
8	Wladimiro Panizza (ITA)	Salvarani	s.t.
9	René Pijnen (NED)	Willem II–Gazelle	+ 1' 37"
10	Marinus Wagtmans (NED)	Willem II–Gazelle	+ 1' 56"

General classification after stage 4

Rank	Rider	Team	Time
1	Julien Stevens (BEL)	Faema	19h 21' 51"
2	Désiré Letort (FRA)	Peugeot–BP–Michelin	+ 1' 28"
3	Eddy Merckx (BEL)	Faema	+ 1' 37"
4	Rudi Altig (FRG)	Salvarani	+ 1' 45"
5	Wladimiro Panizza (ITA)	Salvarani	+ 1' 51"
6	Jan Janssen (NED)	Bic	+ 1' 57"
7	Charly Grosskost (FRA)	Bic	s.t.
8	Felice Gimondi (ITA)	Salvarani	+ 2' 06"
9	Ferdinand Bracke (BEL)	Peugeot–BP–Michelin	+ 2' 08"
10	Raymond Poulidor (FRA)	Mercier–BP–Hutchinson	+ 2' 12"

== Stage 5 ==
3 July 1969 - Nancy to Mulhouse, 194 km (121 mi)

Stage 5 result

Rank	Rider	Team	Time
1	Joaquim Agostinho (POR)	Frimatic–de Gribaldy–Viva–Wolber	5h 03' 33"
2	Rudi Altig (FRG)	Salvarani	+ 18"
3	Roger De Vlaeminck (BEL)	Flandria–De Clerck–Krüger	s.t.
4	Eddy Merckx (BEL)	Faema	s.t.
5	Marinus Wagtmans (NED)	Willem II–Gazelle	s.t.
6	Jan Janssen (NED)	Bic	s.t.
7	Felice Gimondi (ITA)	Salvarani	s.t.
8	Charly Grosskost (FRA)	Bic	s.t.
9	Wilfried David (BEL)	Flandria–De Clerck–Krüger	s.t.
10	Désiré Letort (FRA)	Peugeot–BP–Michelin	s.t.

General classification after stage 5

Rank	Rider	Team	Time
1	Désiré Letort (FRA)	Peugeot–BP–Michelin	24h 27' 10"
2	Eddy Merckx (BEL)	Faema	+ 9"
3	Rudi Altig (FRG)	Salvarani	+ 17"
4	Wladimiro Panizza (ITA)	Salvarani	+ 23"
5	Jan Janssen (NED)	Bic	+ 29"
6	Charly Grosskost (FRA)	Bic	s.t.
7	Felice Gimondi (ITA)	Salvarani	+ 38"
8	Raymond Poulidor (FRA)	Mercier–BP–Hutchinson	+ 44"
9	Pierfranco Vianelli (ITA)	Molteni	s.t.
10	Roger Pingeon (FRA)	Peugeot–BP–Michelin	+ 54"

== Stage 6 ==
4 July 1969 - Mulhouse to Ballon d'Alsace, 133 km (83 mi)

Stage 6 result

Rank	Rider	Team	Time
1	Eddy Merckx (BEL)	Faema	3h 37' 25"
2	Joaquim Galera (ESP)	Fagor	+ 55"
3	Rudi Altig (FRG)	Salvarani	+ 1' 55"
4	Roger De Vlaeminck (BEL)	Flandria–De Clerck–Krüger	+4' 16"
5	Wilfried David (BEL)	Flandria–De Clerck–Krüger	+ 4' 21"
6	Jan Janssen (NED)	Bic	s.t.
7	Felice Gimondi (ITA)	Salvarani	s.t.
8	Roger Pingeon (FRA)	Peugeot–BP–Michelin	s.t.
9	Jean-Claude Theillière (FRA)	Sonolor–Lejeune	s.t.
10	Marinus Wagtmans (NED)	Willem II–Gazelle	s.t.

General classification after stage 6

Rank	Rider	Team	Time
1	Eddy Merckx (BEL)	Faema	28h 04' 44"
2	Rudi Altig (FRG)	Salvarani	+ 2' 03"
3	Jan Janssen (NED)	Bic	+ 4' 41"
4	Felice Gimondi (ITA)	Salvarani	+ 4' 50"
5	Raymond Poulidor (FRA)	Mercier–BP–Hutchinson	+ 4' 56"
6	Pierfranco Vianelli (ITA)	Molteni	s.t.
7	Roger De Vlaeminck (BEL)	Flandria–De Clerck–Krüger	+ 5' 05"
8	Roger Pingeon (FRA)	Peugeot–BP–Michelin	+ 5' 06"
9	Derek Harrison (GBR)	Frimatic–de Gribaldy–Viva–Wolber	s.t.
10	Marinus Wagtmans (NED)	Willem II–Gazelle	+ 5' 15"

== Stage 7 ==
5 July 1969 - Belfort to Divonne-les-Bains, 241 km (150 mi)

Stage 7 result

Rank	Rider	Team	Time
1	Mariano Díaz (ESP)	Fagor	6h 13' 07"
2	José Antonio Momeñe (ESP)	Fagor	+ 1' 53"
3	Marinus Wagtmans (NED)	Willem II–Gazelle	+ 1' 56"
4	José Manuel López (ESP)	Fagor	+ 2' 07"
5	Michele Dancelli (ITA)	Molteni	s.t.
6	Willy Van Neste (BEL)	Dr. Mann–Grundig	s.t.
7	Pietro Scandelli (ITA)	Faema	s.t.
8	Dino Zandegù (ITA)	Salvarani	s.t.
9	Georges Vandenberghe (BEL)	Faema	s.t.
10	Jan Janssen (NED)	Bic	s.t.

General classification after stage 7

Rank	Rider	Team	Time
1	Eddy Merckx (BEL)	Faema	34h 19' 58"
2	Rudi Altig (FRG)	Salvarani	+ 2' 03"
3	Jan Janssen (NED)	Bic	+ 4' 41"
4	Felice Gimondi (ITA)	Salvarani	+ 4' 50"
5	Raymond Poulidor (FRA)	Mercier–BP–Hutchinson	+ 4' 56"
6	Pierfranco Vianelli (ITA)	Molteni	s.t.
7	Marinus Wagtmans (NED)	Willem II–Gazelle	+ 5' 04"
8	Roger De Vlaeminck (BEL)	Flandria–De Clerck–Krüger	+ 5' 05"
9	Roger Pingeon (FRA)	Peugeot–BP–Michelin	+ 5' 06"
10	Derek Harrison (GBR)	Frimatic–de Gribaldy–Viva–Wolber	s.t.

== Stage 8a ==
6 July 1969 - Divonne-les-Bains, 9 km (5.6 mi) (ITT)

Stage 8a result

Rank	Rider	Team	Time
1	Eddy Merckx (BEL)	Faema	10' 38"
2	Rudi Altig (FRG)	Salvarani	+ 2"
3	Charly Grosskost (FRA)	Bic	+ 10"
4	Roger Pingeon (FRA)	Peugeot–BP–Michelin	+ 15"
5	Raymond Poulidor (FRA)	Mercier–BP–Hutchinson	+ 16"
6	Roger De Vlaeminck (BEL)	Flandria–De Clerck–Krüger	+ 19"
7	José Manuel López (ESP)	Fagor	s.t.
8	Edy Schütz (LUX)	Molteni	s.t.
9	Jan Janssen (NED)	Bic	+ 20"
10	Leen Poortvliet (NED)	Willem II–Gazelle	+ 23"

General classification after stage 8a

Rank	Rider	Team	Time
1	Eddy Merckx (BEL)	Faema	34h 30' 36"
2	Rudi Altig (FRG)	Salvarani	+ 2' 05"
3	Jan Janssen (NED)	Bic	+ 5' 01"
4	Raymond Poulidor (FRA)	Mercier–BP–Hutchinson	+ 5' 12"
5	Felice Gimondi (ITA)	Salvarani	+ 5' 16"
6	Pierfranco Vianelli (ITA)	Molteni	+ 5' 19"
7	Roger Pingeon (FRA)	Peugeot–BP–Michelin	+ 5' 21"
8	Roger De Vlaeminck (BEL)	Flandria–De Clerck–Krüger	+ 5' 24"
9	Marinus Wagtmans (NED)	Willem II–Gazelle	+ 5' 32"
10	Derek Harrison (GBR)	Frimatic–de Gribaldy–Viva–Wolber	+ 5' 33"

== Stage 8b ==
6 July 1969 - Divonne-les-Bains to Thonon-les-Bains, 137 km (85 mi)

Stage 8b result

Rank	Rider	Team	Time
1	Michele Dancelli (ITA)	Molteni	3h 30' 46"
2	Andrés Gandarias (ESP)	Kas–Kaskol	+ 4"
3	Marinus Wagtmans (NED)	Willem II–Gazelle	+ 1' 27"
4	Marino Basso (ITA)	Molteni	+ 1' 56"
5	Roger De Vlaeminck (BEL)	Flandria–De Clerck–Krüger	s.t.
6	Dino Zandegù (ITA)	Salvarani	s.t.
7	Jan Janssen (NED)	Bic	s.t.
8	Guido Reybrouck (BEL)	Faema	s.t.
9	Eric Leman (BEL)	Flandria–De Clerck–Krüger	s.t.
10	Gerben Karstens (NED)	Peugeot–BP–Michelin	s.t.

General classification after stage 8b

Rank	Rider	Team	Time
1	Eddy Merckx (BEL)	Faema	38h 03' 18"
2	Rudi Altig (FRG)	Salvarani	+ 2' 05"
3	Jan Janssen (NED)	Bic	+ 5' 01"
4	Marinus Wagtmans (NED)	Willem II–Gazelle	+ 5' 03"
5	Raymond Poulidor (FRA)	Mercier–BP–Hutchinson	+ 5' 12"
6	Felice Gimondi (ITA)	Salvarani	+ 5' 16"
7	Pierfranco Vianelli (ITA)	Molteni	+ 5' 19"
8	Roger Pingeon (FRA)	Peugeot–BP–Michelin	+ 5' 21"
9	Roger De Vlaeminck (BEL)	Flandria–De Clerck–Krüger	+ 5' 24"
10	Derek Harrison (GBR)	Frimatic–de Gribaldy–Viva–Wolber	+ 5' 33"

== Stage 9 ==
7 July 1969 - Thonon-les-Bains to Chamonix, 111 km (69 mi)

Stage 9 result

Rank	Rider	Team	Time
1	Roger Pingeon (FRA)	Peugeot–BP–Michelin	2h 48' 23"
2	Eddy Merckx (BEL)	Faema	s.t.
3	Lucien Van Impe (BEL)	Sonolor–Lejeune	+ 1' 33"
4	Andrés Gandarias (ESP)	Kas–Kaskol	s.t.
5	Raymond Poulidor (FRA)	Mercier–BP–Hutchinson	+ 1' 23"
6	Francisco Galdós (ESP)	Kas–Kaskol	s.t.
7	Santiago Lazcano (ESP)	Kas–Kaskol	s.t.
8	Marinus Wagtmans (NED)	Willem II–Gazelle	+ 2' 13"
9	Jan Janssen (NED)	Bic	s.t.
10	Felice Gimondi (ITA)	Salvarani	s.t.

General classification after stage 9

Rank	Rider	Team	Time
1	Eddy Merckx (BEL)	Faema	40h 51' 41"
2	Roger Pingeon (FRA)	Peugeot–BP–Michelin	+ 5' 21"
3	Raymond Poulidor (FRA)	Mercier–BP–Hutchinson	+ 6' 45"
4	Jan Janssen (NED)	Bic	+ 7' 14"
5	Marinus Wagtmans (NED)	Willem II–Gazelle	+ 7' 16"
6	Felice Gimondi (ITA)	Salvarani	+ 7' 29"
7	Derek Harrison (GBR)	Frimatic–de Gribaldy–Viva–Wolber	+ 7' 46"
8	Wilfried David (BEL)	Flandria–De Clerck–Krüger	+ 8' 35"
9	Andrés Gandarias (ESP)	Kas–Kaskol	+ 9' 20"
10	Pierfranco Vianelli (ITA)	Molteni	+ 9' 41"

== Stage 10 ==
8 July 1969 - Chamonix to Briançon, 221 km (137 mi)

Stage 10 result

Rank	Rider	Team	Time
1	Herman Van Springel (BEL)	Dr. Mann–Grundig	6h 41' 43"
2	Eddy Merckx (BEL)	Faema	+ 2' 01"
3	Marinus Wagtmans (NED)	Willem II–Gazelle	s.t.
4	Felice Gimondi (ITA)	Salvarani	s.t.
5	Roger Pingeon (FRA)	Peugeot–BP–Michelin	s.t.
6	Raymond Poulidor (FRA)	Mercier–BP–Hutchinson	+ 2' 05"
7	Pierfranco Vianelli (ITA)	Molteni	s.t.
8	Andrés Gandarias (ESP)	Kas–Kaskol	s.t.
9	Wladimiro Panizza (ITA)	Salvarani	+ 3' 02"
10	André Poppe (BEL)	Dr. Mann–Grundig	+ 4' 56"

General classification after stage 10

Rank	Rider	Team	Time
1	Eddy Merckx (BEL)	Faema	47h 35' 25"
2	Roger Pingeon (FRA)	Peugeot–BP–Michelin	+ 5' 21"
3	Raymond Poulidor (FRA)	Mercier–BP–Hutchinson	+ 6' 51"
4	Marinus Wagtmans (NED)	Willem II–Gazelle	+ 7' 16"
5	Felice Gimondi (ITA)	Salvarani	+ 7' 29"
6	Andrés Gandarias (ESP)	Kas–Kaskol	+ 9' 24"
7	Pierfranco Vianelli (ITA)	Molteni	+ 9' 45"
8	Herman Van Springel (BEL)	Dr. Mann–Grundig	+ 10' 40"
9	Joaquim Galera (ESP)	Fagor	+ 15' 43"
10	Désiré Letort (FRA)	Peugeot–BP–Michelin	+ 19' 14"
