= 1969 Tour de France =

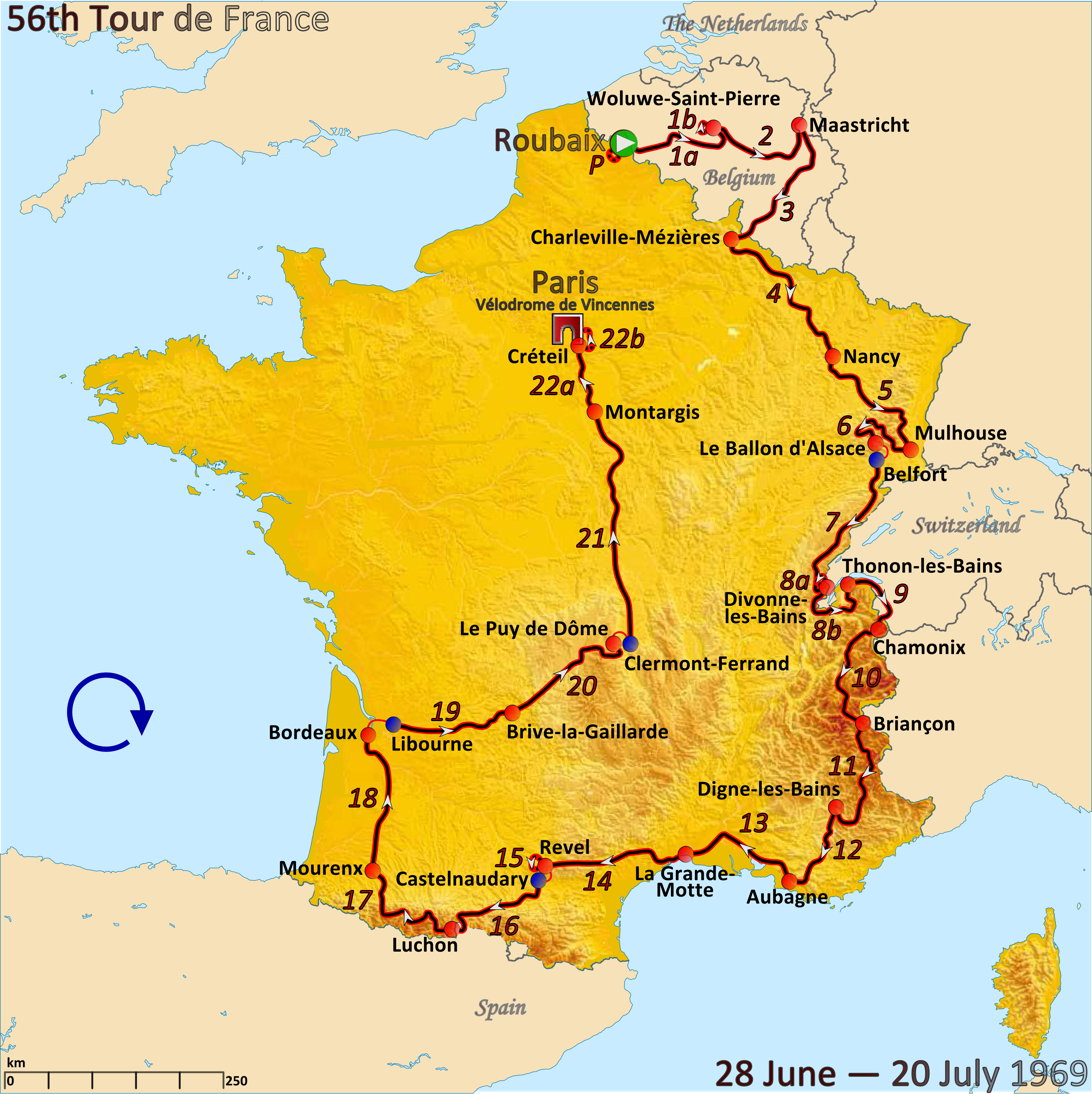
- Route of the 1969 Tour de France

Race details
- Dates: 28 June – 20 July 1969
- Stages: 22 + Prologue, including three split stages
- Distance: 4,117 km (2,558 mi)
- Winning time: 116h 16' 02"

Results
Jersey awarded to the overall winner	Winner	Eddy Merckx (BEL)	(Faema)
	Second	Roger Pingeon (FRA)	(Peugeot–BP–Michelin)
	Third	Raymond Poulidor (FRA)	(Mercier–BP–Hutchinson)
Jersey awarded to the points classification winner	Points	Eddy Merckx (BEL)	(Faema)
	Mountains	Eddy Merckx (BEL)	(Faema)
Jersey awarded to the combination classification winner	Combination	Eddy Merckx (BEL)	(Faema)
	Sprints	Eric Leman (BEL)	(Flandria–De Clerck–Krüger)
	Combativity	Eddy Merckx (BEL)	(Faema)
	Team	Faema	

The 1969 Tour de France was the 56th edition of the Tour de France, one of cycling's Grand Tours. It took place between 28 June and 20 July, with 22 stages covering a distance of 4,117 km (2,558 mi). The participant teams were no longer national teams, but were once more commercially sponsored. The race was won by Eddy Merckx who absolutely dominated the rest of the field. As an example in 1967 nine riders finished within 20:00 of the winner, in 1968 nineteen riders were within 20:00 but in 1969 the 10th place rider was +52:56, the 20th place rider was +1:17:36 and only Roger Pingeon finished inside 20:00 of Merckx.

The 1969 race is the only time that a single cyclist has won the general classification, the points classification and the mountains classification as well. Eddy Merckx rode on the winning team, Faema, and also won the combination classification as well as the combativity award.

== Teams ==
In 1967 and 1968, the Tour was contested by national teams, but in 1969 the commercially sponsored teams were back. The Tour started with 13 teams, each with 10 cyclists: Eddy Merckx had been removed from the 1969 Giro d'Italia in leading position because of a positive doping result, and was initially not allowed to join the 1969 Tour de France, but his suspension was later lifted.

The teams entering the race were:

- Bic
- Dr. Mann–Grundig
- Peugeot–BP–Michelin
- Kas–Kaskol
- Flandria–De Clerck–Krüger
- Faema
- Sonolor–Lejeune
- Mercier–BP–Hutchinson
- Frimatic–de Gribaldy–Viva–Wolber
- Willem II–Gazelle
- Fagor
- Molteni
- Salvarani

== Route and stages ==
The 1969 Tour de France started on 28 June, and had no rest days. The highest point of elevation in the race was 2,556 m (8,386 ft) at the summit tunnel of the Col du Galibier mountain pass on stage 10.

Stage characteristics and winners
Stage	Date	Course	Distance	Type	Winner
P	28 June	Roubaix	10 km (6.2 mi)	Individual time trial	Rudi Altig (FRG)
1a	29 June	Roubaix to Woluwe-Saint-Pierre (Sint-Pieters-Woluwe, Belgium)	147 km (91 mi)	Plain stage	Marino Basso (ITA)
1b	29 June	Woluwe-Saint-Pierre (Belgium)	16 km (9.9 mi)	Team time trial	(Belgium) Faema
2	30 June	Woluwe-Saint-Pierre (Belgium) to Maastricht (Netherlands)	182 km (113 mi)	Plain stage	Julien Stevens (BEL)
3	1 July	Maastricht (Netherlands) to Charleville-Mézières	213 km (132 mi)	Plain stage	Eric Leman (BEL)
4	2 July	Charleville-Mézières to Nancy	214 km (133 mi)	Plain stage	Rik Van Looy (BEL)
5	3 July	Nancy to Mulhouse	194 km (121 mi)	Stage with mountain(s)	Joaquim Agostinho (POR)
6	4 July	Mulhouse to Ballon d'Alsace	133 km (83 mi)	Stage with mountain(s)	Eddy Merckx (BEL)
7	5 July	Belfort to Divonne-les-Bains	241 km (150 mi)	Stage with mountain(s)	Mariano Díaz (ESP)
8a	6 July	Divonne-les-Bains	9 km (5.6 mi)	Individual time trial	Eddy Merckx (BEL)
8b	6 July	Divonne-les-Bains to Thonon-les-Bains	137 km (85 mi)	Stage with mountain(s)	Michele Dancelli (ITA)
9	7 July	Thonon-les-Bains to Chamonix	111 km (69 mi)	Stage with mountain(s)	Roger Pingeon (FRA)
10	8 July	Chamonix to Briançon	221 km (137 mi)	Stage with mountain(s)	Herman Van Springel (BEL)
11	9 July	Briançon to Digne	198 km (123 mi)	Stage with mountain(s)	Eddy Merckx (BEL)
12	10 July	Digne to Aubagne	161 km (100 mi)	Stage with mountain(s)	Felice Gimondi (ITA)
13	11 July	Aubagne to La Grande-Motte	196 km (122 mi)	Plain stage	Guido Reybrouck (BEL)
14	12 July	La Grande-Motte to Revel	234 km (145 mi)	Plain stage	Joaquim Agostinho (POR)
15	13 July	Revel	19 km (12 mi)	Individual time trial	Eddy Merckx (BEL)
16	14 July	Castelnaudary to Luchon	199 km (124 mi)	Stage with mountain(s)	Raymond Delisle (FRA)
17	15 July	Luchon to Mourenx	214 km (133 mi)	Stage with mountain(s)	Eddy Merckx (BEL)
18	16 July	Mourenx to Bordeaux	201 km (125 mi)	Plain stage	Barry Hoban (GBR)
19	17 July	Bordeaux to Brive	193 km (120 mi)	Plain stage	Barry Hoban (GBR)
20	18 July	Brive to Puy de Dôme	198 km (123 mi)	Stage with mountain(s)	Pierre Matignon (FRA)
21	19 July	Clermont-Ferrand to Montargis	329 km (204 mi)	Plain stage	Herman Van Springel (BEL)
22a	20 July	Montargis to Créteil	111 km (69 mi)	Plain stage	Jozef Spruyt (BEL)
22b	20 July	Créteil to Paris	37 km (23 mi)	Individual time trial	Eddy Merckx (BEL)
	Total		4,117 km (2,558 mi)		

== Race overview ==
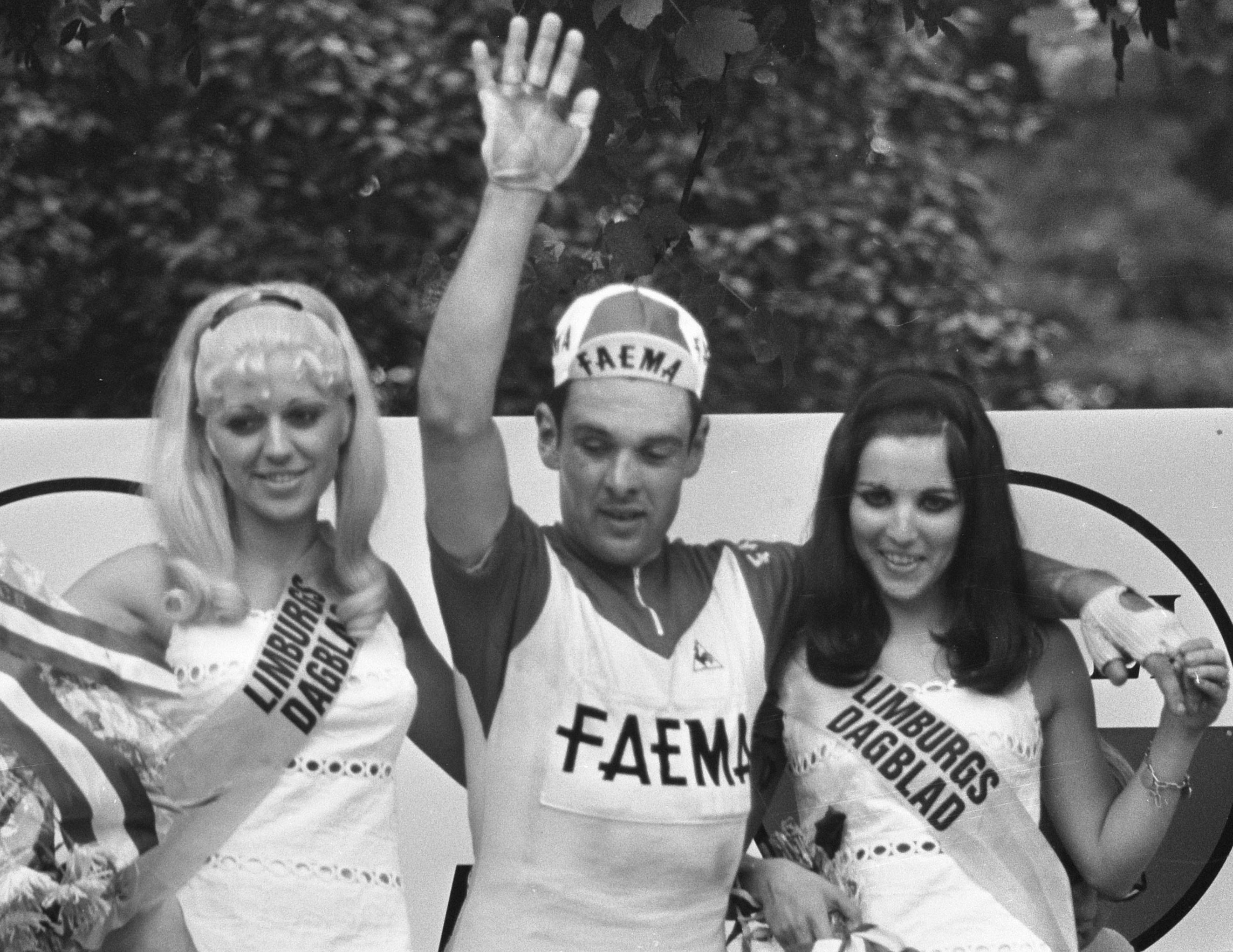
Julien Stevens after his win in Maastricht, Netherlands, on stage two

Rudi Altig won the prologue, where Merckx finished second. In the team time trial in the second part of the first stage, Merckx's team won, and this gave Merckx the lead.

In the second stage, a group escaped, with Merckx's teammate Julien Stevens as highest-ranked cyclist. There were no dangerous competitors in the escape, so Merckx did not chase them. The group stayed away, and Stevens took over the lead, with Merckx in second place.

In the fourth stage, Rik Van Looy escaped, because he wanted to show that even at the age of 35, he should still be selected for the Belgian squad for the 1969 UCI Road World Championships. Van Looy quickly took several minutes, and became the virtual leader of the race. With less than 40 km to go, Stevens tried to defend his lead by attacking. He was followed by a group of cyclists, including René Pijnen, one of Van Looy's teammates. Pijnen was trying to stop the chase, and this angered the other cyclists in the group. The group nonetheless was able to reduce the margin to less than a minute, and Stevens conserved his lead.

In the fifth stage, Stevens was not able to stay in the first group. Désiré Letort, who had joined Stevens in the chase the previous stage, became the new leader, 9 seconds ahead of Merckx.

The first mountains showed up in the sixth stage, with a mountain finish on the Ballon d'Alsace. Merckx won convincingly: Joaquim Galera was second after 55 seconds, Altig after almost two minutes, and the next cyclist came after more than four minutes. Because Letort was more than seven minutes behind, Merckx was now the leader, with Altig in second place, more than two minutes behind. Notably, the 1965, 1967 and 1968 Tour de France winners in Felice Gimondi, Roger Pingeon and Jan Janssen were all distanced into the surviving peloton group which finished some two and a half minutes behind Altig.

Merckx won the short time trial in stage 8, but only gained two seconds on Altig. Stage 8B was a half stage in which Andrés Gandarias and Michele Dancelli got away from the bunch by almost two minutes setting themselves up for a sprint but Dancelli pulled away near the end and won by four seconds.

In the ninth stage, Roger Pingeon and Merckx were away, with Pingeon winning the sprint. Altig lost almost eight minutes, and was out of contention. The second place was now taken by Pingeon, more than five minutes behind. Stage 10 saw the previous year's runner up Herman Van Springel win the stage which included the climbs of the Col du Télégraphe and the Col du Galibier. He finished about two minutes ahead of the Merckx group with the GC only changing slightly.

Merckx added some time in the eleventh stage, which he won, and the twelfth stage, where he finished in the first group. After the twelfth stage, Merckx was leading by more than seven minutes. After he won the time trial in stage fifteen, it was more than eight minutes.

By then, his victory was all but assured, he just had to make sure that he stayed with his competitors. In the seventeenth stage however, Merckx did something historic. This stage would see the climbs of the Col de Peyresourde, Col d'Aspin, Col du Tourmalet and Col d'Aubisque and the Faema team controlled the pace of the bunch from the very start. Martin Van Den Bossche set a devastating pace while climbing the Tourmalet causing the surviving main field to break apart. Nearing the summit Merckx attacked to claim the points but as he cleared the summit he realized no one else was with him and he attacked again as the descent began. At the bottom of the hill several minutes later he had built a lead of about a minute and it only began to grow from there. Lomme Driessens, the Directeur Sportif for Faema, told Merckx to sit up and wait for the others while taking a few minutes to get some food in him as there was still 105 kilometers to go. Merckx didn't always agree with Driessens on tactics and had second thoughts about sitting up and waiting for everyone else to catch up. When he got his next time check and realized he now had a gap of +3:00 he decided to attack even harder and by the time he reached the summit of the Aubisque he had a gap of about +7:00. He rode consistently with undeniable power as the surviving reduced peloton just could not bring him back, or even cut into the lead he was continuously building over them.

Michele Dancelli crossed the line in 2nd within a group of seven riders just shy of eight minutes behind Merckx. Everyone else including the defending champ was close to or well beyond fifteen minutes behind Merckx. This stage nearly doubled what was already almost certainly an insurmountable lead, and was a defining moment in cycling history when a rider did something that seemed impossible and would likely never be seen again. By winning the final time trial, he increased his winning margin to almost eighteen minutes.

July 20 the race ended with a split stage that arrived in Paris with a 37 km individual time trial. The winner of the Points Classification was Merckx, the winner of the Combination Classification was Merckx, the winner of the King of the Mountains competition was Merckx, the Yellow Jersey was won for the first time by Merckx, Merckx was also named the Most Combative Rider and won six stages. Before or since no other rider has accomplished winning all of these competitions in the same tour.

Eric Leman narrowly won the Sprints Competition ahead of the French speaking, Belgian-British rider Michael Wright.

During the 2019 Tour de France Eddy Merckx and the 50th anniversary of this Tour were honored at the Grand Depart in Belgium.

=== Doping ===
After the controversial doping-incident with Merckx in the 1969 Giro, the rules for doping offences were changed: riders were no longer removed from the race, but were given a penalty of fifteen minutes in the general classification. After every stage in the 1969 Tour, three cyclists were tested. These were either the first three of the stage, the first three in the general classification, or three randomly selected cyclists. Five riders tested positive: Henk Nijdam, Jozef Timmerman, Rudi Altig, Bernard Guyot and Pierre Matignon. Nijdam, Timmerman and Altig requested their B samples to be tested, but they also returned positive. Altig, Guyot and Matignon were given the time penalty of fifteen minutes; Nijdam and Timmerman had already left the race when the results came out.

== Classification leadership and minor prizes ==
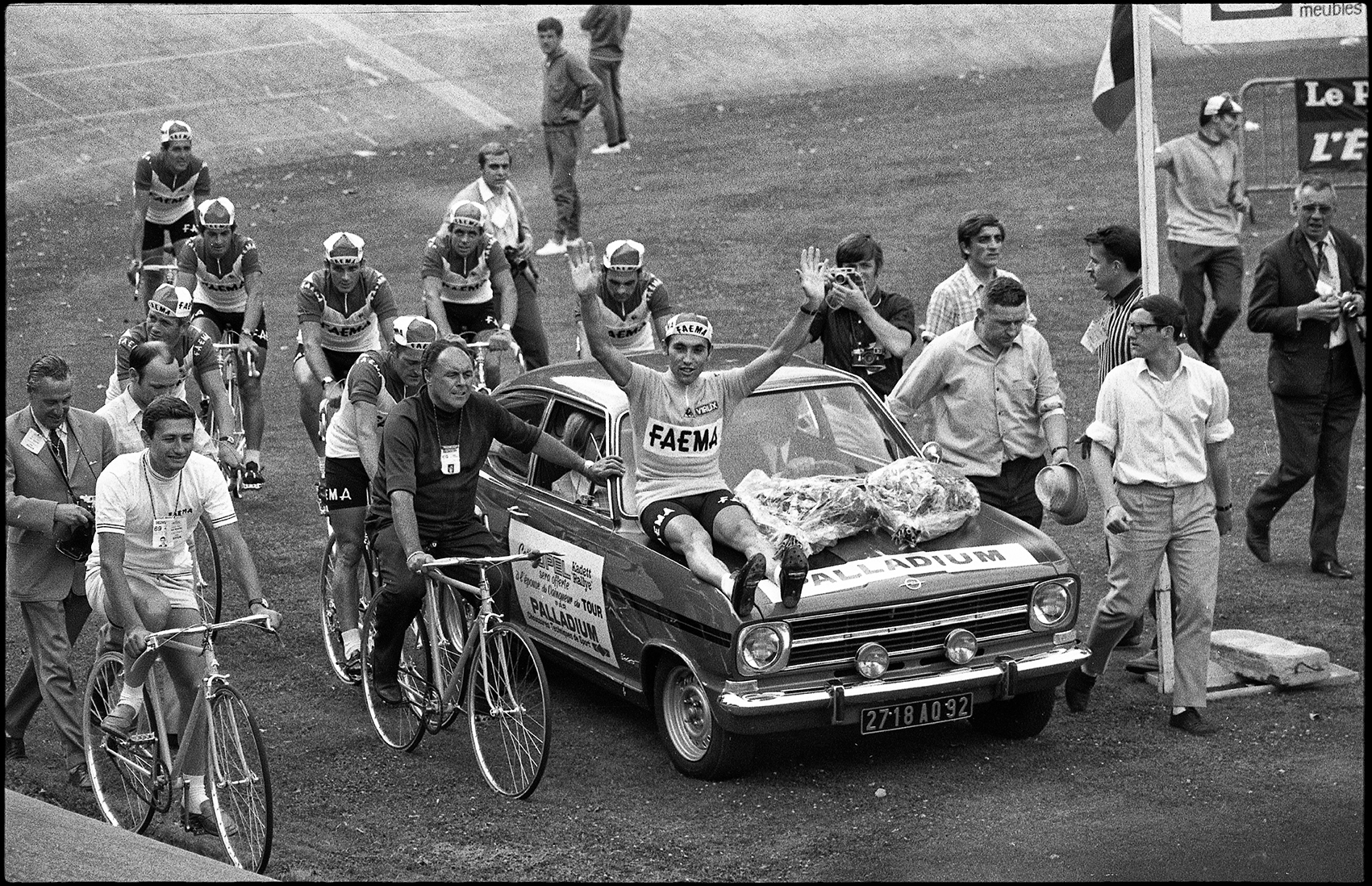
Eddy Merckx and his team celebrating his first victory in the 1969 Tour de France

There were several classifications in the 1969 Tour de France, three of them awarding jerseys to their leaders. The most important was the general classification, calculated by adding each cyclist's finishing times on each stage. The cyclist with the least accumulated time was the race leader, identified by the yellow jersey; the winner of this classification is considered the winner of the Tour.

Additionally, there was a points classification, which awarded a green jersey. In the points classification, cyclists got points for finishing among the best in a stage finish, or in intermediate sprints. The cyclist with the most points lead the classification.

There was also a mountains classification. The organisation had categorised some climbs as either first, second, third, or fourth-category; points for this classification were won by the first cyclists that reached the top of these climbs first, with more points available for the higher-categorised climbs. The cyclist with the most points lead the classification, but was not identified with a jersey in 1969.

Another classification was the combination classification. This classification was calculated as a combination of the other classifications, its leader wore the white jersey. Specifically it combined the rankings of the general, points, and mountains classifications.

The fifth individual classification was the intermediate sprints classification. This classification had similar rules as the points classification, but only points were awarded on intermediate sprints. In 1969, this classification had no associated jersey.

For the team classification, the times of the best three cyclists per team on each stage were added; the leading team was the team with the lowest total time. The riders in the team that led this classification wore yellow caps.

In addition, there was a combativity award given after each stage to the cyclist considered most combative. The split stages each had a combined winner. The decision was made by a jury composed of journalists who gave points. The cyclist with the most points from votes in all stages led the combativity classification. Eddy Merckx won this classification, and was given overall the super-combativity award. The Souvenir Henri Desgrange was given to the first rider to pass the memorial to Tour founder Henri Desgrange near the summit of the Col du Galibier on stage 10. This prize was won by Merckx.

Classification leadership by stage
Stage	Winner	General classification	Points classification	Mountains classification (Note: No jersey was awarded to the leader of the mountains classification until a white jersey with red polka dots was introduced in 1975.)	Combination classification	Intermediate sprints classification	Team classification	Combativity	
Stage	Winner	General classification	Points classification	Mountains classification	Combination classification	Intermediate sprints classification	Team classification	Award	Classification
P	Rudi Altig	Rudi Altig	Rudi Altig	no award	no award	no award	Salvarani	no award	no award
1a	Marino Basso	Rudi Altig	Marino Basso	Roger De Vlaeminck	Eddy Merckx	Wilfried David	Salvarani	Jean-Pierre Genet	Jean-Pierre Genet
1b	Faema	Eddy Merckx	Marino Basso	Roger De Vlaeminck	Eddy Merckx	Wilfried David	Faema	Jean-Pierre Genet	Jean-Pierre Genet
2	Julien Stevens	Julien Stevens	Marino Basso	Roger De Vlaeminck	Eddy Merckx	Wilfried David	Faema	Rudi Altig	Rudi Altig
3	Eric Leman	Julien Stevens	Marino Basso	Roger De Vlaeminck	Eddy Merckx	Michael Wright	Faema	Jozef Timmerman	Jozef Timmerman
4	Rik Van Looy	Julien Stevens	Marino Basso	Roger De Vlaeminck	Eddy Merckx	Wilfried David	Faema	Rik Van Looy	Jozef Timmerman
5	Joaquim Agostinho	Désiré Letort	Marino Basso	Roger De Vlaeminck	Eddy Merckx	Michael Wright	Salvarani	Joaquim Agostinho	Joaquim Agostinho
6	Eddy Merckx	Eddy Merckx	Eddy Merckx	Eddy Merckx	Eddy Merckx	Michael Wright	Salvarani	Rudi Altig	Joaquim Agostinho
7	Mariano Díaz	Eddy Merckx	Roger De Vlaeminck	Joaquim Galera	Eddy Merckx	Michael Wright	Salvarani	Mariano Díaz	Joaquim Agostinho
8a	Eddy Merckx	Eddy Merckx	Roger De Vlaeminck	Joaquim Galera	Eddy Merckx	Michael Wright	Salvarani	Michele Dancelli	Joaquim Agostinho
8b	Michele Dancelli	Eddy Merckx	Roger De Vlaeminck	Joaquim Galera	Eddy Merckx	Michael Wright	Salvarani	Michele Dancelli	Joaquim Agostinho
9	Roger Pingeon	Eddy Merckx	Eddy Merckx	Eddy Merckx	Eddy Merckx	Michael Wright	Salvarani	Roger Pingeon	Joaquim Agostinho
10	Herman Van Springel	Eddy Merckx	Eddy Merckx	Eddy Merckx	Eddy Merckx	Michael Wright	Faema	Roger Pingeon	Joaquim Agostinho
11	Eddy Merckx	Eddy Merckx	Eddy Merckx	Eddy Merckx	Eddy Merckx	Raymond Riotte	Fagor	Eddy Merckx	Eddy Merckx
12	Felice Gimondi	Eddy Merckx	Eddy Merckx	Eddy Merckx	Eddy Merckx	Raymond Riotte	Kas–Kaskol	Felice Gimondi	Eddy Merckx
13	Guido Reybrouck	Eddy Merckx	Eddy Merckx	Eddy Merckx	Eddy Merckx	Raymond Riotte	Kas–Kaskol	Raymond Riotte	Eddy Merckx
14	Joaquim Agostinho	Eddy Merckx	Eddy Merckx	Eddy Merckx	Eddy Merckx	Michael Wright	Kas–Kaskol	Joaquim Agostinho	Joaquim Agostinho
15	Eddy Merckx	Eddy Merckx	Eddy Merckx	Eddy Merckx	Eddy Merckx	Michael Wright	Faema	Raymond Delisle	Joaquim Agostinho
16	Raymond Delisle	Eddy Merckx	Eddy Merckx	Eddy Merckx	Eddy Merckx	Michael Wright	Kas–Kaskol	Eddy Merckx	Joaquim Agostinho
17	Eddy Merckx	Eddy Merckx	Eddy Merckx	Eddy Merckx	Eddy Merckx	Michael Wright	Faema	Bernard Guyot	Eddy Merckx
18	Barry Hoban	Eddy Merckx	Eddy Merckx	Eddy Merckx	Eddy Merckx	Michael Wright	Faema	Wladimiro Panizza	Eddy Merckx
19	Barry Hoban	Eddy Merckx	Eddy Merckx	Eddy Merckx	Eddy Merckx	Eric Leman	Faema	Pierre Matignon	Eddy Merckx
20	Pierre Matignon	Eddy Merckx	Eddy Merckx	Eddy Merckx	Eddy Merckx	Eric Leman	Faema	Roland Berland	Eddy Merckx
21	Herman Van Springel	Eddy Merckx	Eddy Merckx	Eddy Merckx	Eddy Merckx	Eric Leman	Faema		Eddy Merckx
22a	Jozef Spruyt	Eddy Merckx	Eddy Merckx	Eddy Merckx	Eddy Merckx	Eric Leman	Faema	Roland Berland	Eddy Merckx
22b	Eddy Merckx	Eddy Merckx	Eddy Merckx	Eddy Merckx	Eddy Merckx	Eric Leman	Faema	Roland Berland	Eddy Merckx
Final		Eddy Merckx	Eddy Merckx	Eddy Merckx	Eddy Merckx	Eric Leman	Faema	Eddy Merckx	

== Final standings ==
Legend
A yellow jersey.	Denotes the winner of the general classification	A green jersey.	Denotes the winner of the points classification
A white jersey.	Denotes the winner of the combination classification		

=== General classification ===
Final general classification (1–10)
Rank	Rider	Team	Time
1	Eddy Merckx (BEL)	Faema	116h 16' 02"
2	Roger Pingeon (FRA)	Peugeot–BP–Michelin	+ 17' 54"
3	Raymond Poulidor (FRA)	Mercier–BP–Hutchinson	+ 22' 13"
4	Felice Gimondi (ITA)	Salvarani	+ 29' 24"
5	Andrés Gandarias (ESP)	Kas–Kaskol	+ 33' 04"
6	Marinus Wagtmans (NED)	Willem II–Gazelle	+ 33' 57"
7	Pierfranco Vianelli (ITA)	Molteni	+ 42' 40"
8	Joaquim Agostinho (POR)	Frimatic–de Gribaldy–Viva–Wolber	+ 51' 24"
9	Désiré Letort (FRA)	Peugeot–BP–Michelin	+ 51' 41"
10	Jan Janssen (NED)	Bic	+ 52' 56"

Final general classification (11–86)
Rank	Rider	Team	Time
11	Joaquim Galera (ESP)	Fagor	+ 54' 47"
12	Lucien Van Impe (BEL)	Sonolor–Lejeune	+ 56' 17"
13	Jean-Claude Theillière (FRA)	Sonolor–Lejeune	+ 1h 04' 58"
14	Wladimiro Panizza (ITA)	Salvarani	+ 1h 05' 16"
15	Eddy Schutz (LUX)	Molteni	+ 1h 06' 58"
16	Jean Dumont (FRA)	Peugeot–BP–Michelin	+ 1h 07' 25"
17	Paul Gutty (FRA)	Frimatic–de Gribaldy–Viva–Wolber	+ 1h 08' 05"
18	Herman Van Springel (BEL)	Dr. Mann–Grundig	+ 1h 10' 11"
19	Eduardo Castelló (ESP)	Kas–Kaskol	+ 1h 14' 04"
20	Michele Dancelli (ITA)	Molteni	+ 1h 17' 36"
21	Francisco Galdós (ESP)	Kas–Kaskol	+ 1h 17' 44"
22	José-Manuel Lopez-Rodriguez (ESP)	Fagor	+ 1h 21' 20"
23	Martin Vandenbossche (BEL)	Faema	+ 1h 22' 08"
24	Francisco Gabica (ESP)	Fagor	+ 1h 28' 19"
25	Bernard Labourdette (FRA)	Mercier–BP–Hutchinson	+ 1h 30' 03"
26	André Zimmermann (FRA)	Sonolor–Lejeune	+ 1h 33' 56"
27	Wilfried David (BEL)	Flandria–De Clerck–Krüger	+ 1h 36' 31"
28	Jozef Spruyt (BEL)	Faema	+ 1h 42' 08"
29	Victor Van Schil (BEL)	Faema	+ 1h 49' 08"
30	Lucien Aimar (FRA)	Bic	+ 1h 52' 57"
31	André Bayssiere (FRA)	Peugeot–BP–Michelin	+ 1h 57' 58"
32	Derek Harrison (GBR)	Frimatic–de Gribaldy–Viva–Wolber	+ 1h 58' 24"
33	André Poppe (BEL)	Dr. Mann–Grundig	+ 1h 59' 59"
34	Stéphane Abrahamian (FRA)	Sonolor–Lejeune	+ 2h 01' 36"
35	Maurice Izier (FRA)	Frimatic–de Gribaldy–Viva–Wolber	+ 2h 04' 56"
36	Dino Zandegù (ITA)	Salvarani	+ 2h 07' 28"
37	Raymond Delisle (FRA)	Peugeot–BP–Michelin	+ 2h 08' 57"
38	Domingo Perurena (ESP)	Fagor	+ 2h 15' 13"
39	Franco Balmamion (ITA)	Salvarani	+ 2h 15' 25"
40	Edward Janssens (BEL)	Mercier–BP–Hutchinson	+ 2h 15' 49"
41	Santiago Lazcano (ESP)	Kas–Kaskol	+ 2h 17' 33"
42	Christian Raymond (FRA)	Peugeot–BP–Michelin	+ 2h 18' 16"
43	Giancarlo Ferretti (ITA)	Salvarani	+ 2h 24' 29"
44	Roger Swerts (BEL)	Faema	+ 2h 26' 19"
45	Gilbert Bellone (FRA)	Bic	+ 2h 26' 22"
46	Jean-Claude Lebaube (FRA)	Frimatic–de Gribaldy–Viva–Wolber	+ 2h 30' 09"
47	Manuel Galera (ESP)	Fagor	+ 2h 31' 22"
48	Jean Vidament (FRA)	Mercier–BP–Hutchinson	+ 2h 33' 17"
49	Evert Dolman (NED)	Willem II–Gazelle	+ 2h 33' 37"
50	Bernard Guyot (FRA)	Sonolor–Lejeune	+ 2h 40' 41"
51	Roberto Poggiali (ITA)	Salvarani	+ 2h 41' 17"
52	Wilfried Peffgen (FRG)	Salvarani	+ 2h 42' 50"
53	Roland Berland (FRA)	Bic	+ 2h 43' 47"
54	Francis Rigon (FRA)	Frimatic–de Gribaldy–Viva–Wolber	+ 2h 44' 05"
55	Robert Bouloux (FRA)	Peugeot–BP–Michelin	+ 2h 44' 17"
56	Georges Vandenberghe (BEL)	Faema	+ 2h 44' 17"
57	Ferdinand Bracke (BEL)	Peugeot–BP–Michelin	+ 2h 45' 28"
58	José Gomez-Lucas (ESP)	Kas–Kaskol	+ 2h 46' 12"
59	Pietro Scandelli (ITA)	Faema	+ 2h 46' 42"
60	Jaak De Boever (BEL)	Flandria–De Clerck–Krüger	+ 2h 47' 11"
61	Nemesio Jimenez (ESP)	Kas–Kaskol	+ 2h 47' 59"
62	Jean-Louis Bodin (FRA)	Frimatic–de Gribaldy–Viva–Wolber	+ 2h 49' 32"
63	Cees Haast (NED)	Willem II–Gazelle	+ 2h 51' 09"
64	Juul Van der Flaas (BEL)	Willem II–Gazelle	+ 2h 51' 44"
65	Gerben Karstens (NED)	Peugeot–BP–Michelin	+ 2h 52' 17"
66	José Catieau (FRA)	Sonolor–Lejeune	+ 2h 53' 46"
67	Barry Hoban (GBR)	Mercier–BP–Hutchinson	+ 2h 54' 02"
68	Jean-Pierre Genet (FRA)	Mercier–BP–Hutchinson	+ 2h 54' 15"
69	Mario Anni (ITA)	Molteni	+ 2h 54' 18"
70	Edouard Delberghe (FRA)	Sonolor–Lejeune	+ 2h 55' 58"
71	Michael Wright (GBR)	Bic	+ 2h 56' 47"
72	Julien Stevens (BEL)	Faema	+ 2h 59' 38"
73	Giacinto Santambrogio (ITA)	Molteni	+ 3h 01' 27"
74	Michel Coulon (BEL)	Flandria–De Clerck–Krüger	+ 3h 06' 01"
75	Paul In' t Ven (BEL)	Dr. Mann–Grundig	+ 3h 06'02"
76	Frans Mintjens (BEL)	Faema	+ 3h 07' 06"
77	Guido Reybrouck (BEL)	Faema	+ 3h 08' 00"
78	Harm Ottenbros (NED)	Willem II–Gazelle	+ 3h 08' 10"
79	Eric Leman (BEL)	Flandria–De Clerck–Krüger	+ 3h 12' 13"
80	Raymond Riotte (FRA)	Mercier–BP–Hutchinson	+ 3h 12' 37"
81	Pietro Guerra (ITA)	Salvarani	+ 3h 15' 53"
82	Marc De Block (BEL)	Flandria–De Clerck–Krüger	+ 3h 21' 15"
83	Eddy Beugels (NED)	Mercier–BP–Hutchinson	+ 3h 21' 52"
84	Roger Cooreman (BEL)	Dr. Mann–Grundig	+ 3h 34' 37"
85	Pierre Matignon (FRA)	Frimatic–de Gribaldy–Viva–Wolber	+ 3h 45' 23"
86	André Wilhelm (FRA)	Sonolor–Lejeune	+ 3h 51' 53"

=== Points classification ===
Final points classification (1–10)
Rank	Rider	Team	Points
1	Eddy Merckx (BEL)	Faema	244
2	Jan Janssen (NED)	Bic	150
3	Marinus Wagtmans (NED)	Willem II–Gazelle	136
4	Roger Pingeon (FRA)	Peugeot–BP–Michelin	131
5	Felice Gimondi (ITA)	Salvarani	108
6	Raymond Poulidor (FRA)	Mercier–BP–Hutchinson	99
7	Michele Dancelli (ITA)	Molteni	95
8	Joaquim Agostinho (POR)	Frimatic–de Gribaldy–Viva–Wolber	91
9	Andrés Gandarias (ESP)	Kas–Kaskol	89
10	Harm Ottenbros (NED)	Willem II–Gazelle	82

=== Mountains classification ===
Final mountains classification (1–10)
Rank	Rider	Team	Points
1	Eddy Merckx (BEL)	Faema	155
2	Roger Pingeon (FRA)	Peugeot–BP–Michelin	94
3	Joaquim Galera (ESP)	Fagor	80
4	Paul Gutty (FRA)	Frimatic–de Gribaldy–Viva–Wolber	68
5	Andrés Gandarias (ESP)	Kas–Kaskol	54
6	Felice Gimondi (ITA)	Salvarani	51
7	Raymond Poulidor (FRA)	Mercier–BP–Hutchinson	48
8	Martin Vandenbossche (BEL)	Faema	36
9	Raymond Delisle (FRA)	Peugeot–BP–Michelin	29
10	Wladimiro Panizza (ITA)	Salvarani	28

=== Combination classification ===
Final combination classification (1–5)
Rank	Rider	Team	Points
1	Eddy Merckx (BEL)	Faema	3
2	Roger Pingeon (FRA)	Peugeot–BP–Michelin	8
3	Felice Gimondi (ITA)	Salvarani	15
4	Raymond Poulidor (FRA)	Mercier–BP–Hutchinson	16
5	Andrés Gandarias (ESP)	Kas–Kaskol	19

=== Intermediate sprints classification ===
Final intermediate sprints classification (1–10)
Rank	Rider	Team	Points
1	Eric Leman (BEL)	Flandria–De Clerck–Krüger	53
2	Michael Wright (GBR)	Bic	46
3	Raymond Riotte (FRA)	Mercier–BP–Hutchinson	43
4	Domingo Perurena (ESP)	Fagor	20
5	Stéphan Abrahamian (FRA)	Sonolor–Lejeune	17
6	Wilfried David (BEL)	Flandria–De Clerck–Krüger	16
7	José Manuel López Rodríguez (ESP)	Fagor	11
8	Michele Dancelli (ITA)	Molteni	10
9	Andrés Gandarias (ESP)	Kas–Kaskol	8
10	Barry Hoban (GBR)	Mercier–BP–Hutchinson	8

=== Team classification ===
Final team classification (1–10)
Rank	Team	Time
1	Faema	351h 50' 56"
2	Peugeot–BP–Michelin	+ 14' 53"
3	Kas–Kaskol	+ 1h 01' 42"
4	Fagor	+ 1h 17' 46"
5	Frimatic–de Gribaldy–Viva–Wolber	+ 1h 28' 20"
6	Salvarani	+ 1h 32' 30"
7	Mercier–BP–Hutchinson	+ 1h 38' 03"
8	Molteni	+ 1h 41' 38"
9	Sonolor–Lejeune	+ 1h 41' 41"
10	Bic	+ 3h 07' 22"

=== Combativity classification ===
Final combativity classification (1–10)
Rank	Rider	Team	Points
1	Eddy Merckx (BEL)	Faema	419
2	Joaquim Agostinho (POR)	Frimatic–de Gribaldy–Viva–Wolber	320
3	Michele Dancelli (ITA)	Molteni	178
3	Felice Gimondi (ITA)	Salvarani	178
5	Andrés Gandarias (ESP)	Kas–Kaskol	159
6	Raymond Delisle (FRA)	Peugeot–BP–Michelin	146
7	Roger Pingeon (FRA)	Peugeot–BP–Michelin	138
8	Pierre Matignon (FRA)	Frimatic–de Gribaldy–Viva–Wolber	98
9	Wladimiro Panizza (ITA)	Salvarani	89
10	Roland Berland (FRA)	Bic	88

== Bibliography ==
- Augendre, Jacques (2016). Guide historique [Historical guide] (PDF) (in French). Paris: Amaury Sport Organisation. Archived (PDF) from the original on 17 August 2016.
- McGann, Bill; McGann, Carol (2008). The Story of the Tour de France: 1965–2007. Vol. 2. Indianapolis: Dog Ear Publishing. ISBN 978-1-59858-608-4.
- Nauright, John; Parrish, Charles (2012). Sports Around the World: History, Culture, and Practice. Vol. 2. Santa Barbara, California: ABC-CLIO. ISBN 978-1-59884-300-2.
- van den Akker, Pieter (2018). Tour de France Rules and Statistics: 1903–2018. Self-published. ISBN 978-1-79398-080-9.
