= 1969 Critérium du Dauphiné Libéré =

Race details
- Dates: 25–31 May 1969
- Stages: 6
- Distance: 1,126 km (700 mi)
- Winning time: 29h 42' 55"

Results
	Winner	Raymond Poulidor (FRA)	(Mercier–BP–Hutchinson)
	Second	Ferdinand Bracke (BEL)	(Peugeot–BP–Michelin)
	Third	Roger Pingeon (FRA)	(Peugeot–BP–Michelin)
	Points	Jan Janssen (NED)	(Bic)
	Mountains	Roger Pingeon (FRA)	(Peugeot–BP–Michelin)
	Team	Peugeot–BP–Michelin	

The 1969 Critérium du Dauphiné Libéré, also known as the 1969 Criterium of the Six Provinces, was the 21st edition of the cycle race and was held from 25 May to 31 May 1969. The race started in Avignon and finished at Lyon. The race was won by Raymond Poulidor of the Mercier team.

== Teams ==
Ten teams, containing a total of 100 riders, participated in the race:

- Bic
- Flandria–De Clerck–Krüger
- Frimatic–de Gribaldy–Viva–Wolber
- Kas–Kaskol
- Dr. Mann–Grundig
- Mercier–BP–Hutchinson
- Peugeot–BP–Michelin
- Italian team
- Sonolor–Lejeune
- Zimba–Mondia

== Route ==
Stage characteristics and winners
Stage	Date	Course	Distance	Type	Winner
1a	25 May	Avignon	11.4 km (7.1 mi)	Individual time trial	Raymond Poulidor (FRA)
1b	26 May	Avignon to Montélimar	117 km (73 mi)		Jaak De Boever (BEL)
1c	26 May	Montélimar to Valence	85 km (53 mi)		Ferdinand Bracke (BEL)
2	27 May	Valence to Grenoble	201 km (125 mi)		Jan Janssen (NED)
3	28 May	Grenoble to Annecy	181 km (112 mi)		Jean-Claude Theillière (FRA)
4	29 May	Annecy to Chalon-sur-Saône	227 km (141 mi)		Pietro Guerra (ITA)
5a	30 May	Montceau-les-Mines to Digoin	34.6 km (21.5 mi)	Individual time trial	Raymond Poulidor (FRA)
5b	30 May	Digoin to Roanne	81 km (50 mi)		Eric Leman (FRA)
6a	31 May	Roanne to Saint-Étienne	118 km (73 mi)		Jos Huysmans (BEL)
6b	31 May	Saint-Étienne to Lyon	70 km (43 mi)		Walter Godefroot (BEL)

== General classification ==
Final general classification

Rank	Rider	Team	Time
1	Raymond Poulidor (FRA)	Mercier–BP–Hutchinson	29h 42' 55"
2	Ferdinand Bracke (BEL)	Peugeot–BP–Michelin	+ 18"
3	Roger Pingeon (FRA)	Peugeot–BP–Michelin	+ 45"
4	Jacques Anquetil (FRA)	Bic	+ 2' 50"
5	Willy Van Neste (BEL)	Dr. Mann–Grundig	+ 3' 15"
6	Paul Gutty (FRA)	Frimatic–de Gribaldy–Viva–Wolber	+ 3' 56"
7	Herman Van Springel (BEL)	Dr. Mann–Grundig	+ 4' 11"
8	Francisco Galdós (ESP)	Kas–Kaskol	+ 4' 58"
9	Aurelio González Puente (ESP)	Kas–Kaskol	+ 5' 10"
10	Jean-Claude Theillière (FRA)	Sonolor–Lejeune	+ 7' 36"
