= Mont Faron =

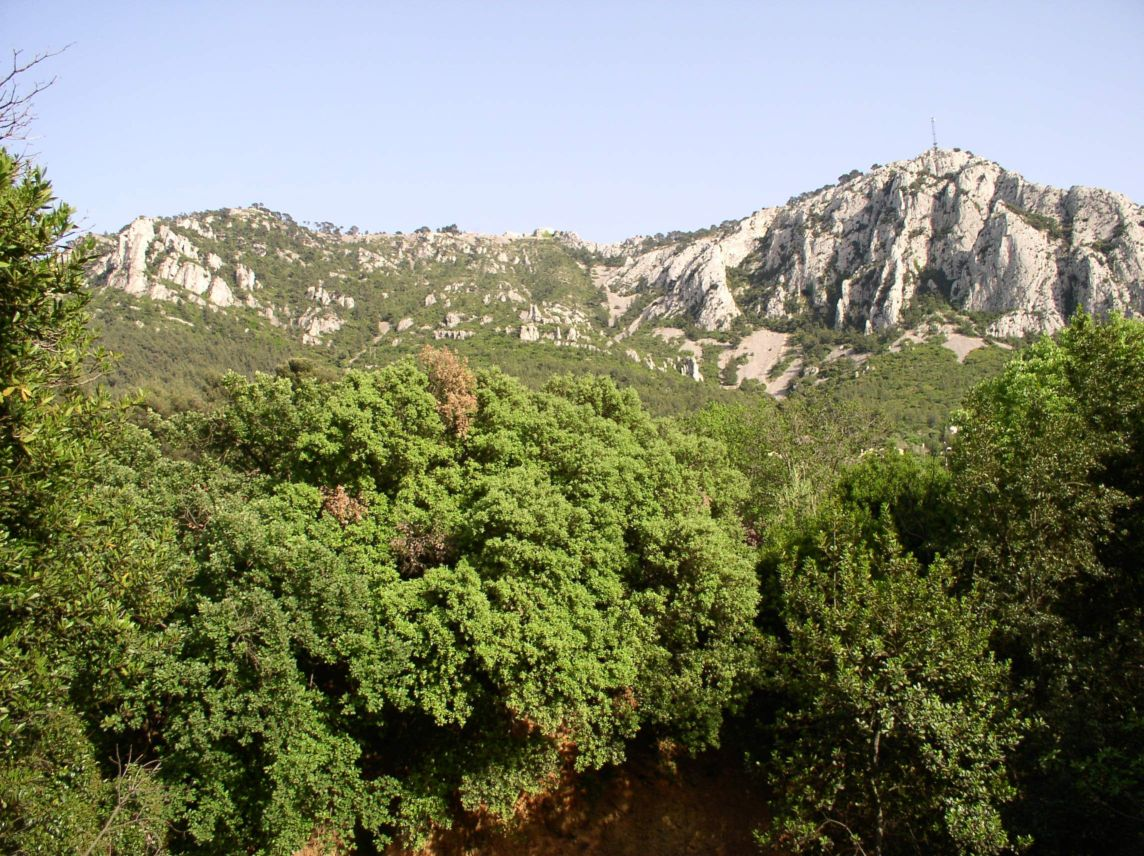

Highest point
- Elevation: 584 m (1,916 ft)
- Coordinates: 43°08′58″N 5°57′04″E

Geography
- Location within France
- Location: Var, France

Climbing
- Easiest route: road or cable car

Mont Faron is a mountain overlooking the city and roadstead of Toulon, France. It is 584m high. At its peak is a memorial dedicated to the 1944 Allied landings in Provence (Operation Dragoon), and to the liberation of Toulon.

The top can be reached either by a cable car from Toulon, or by a steep and narrow road which ascends from the west side and descends on the east side. The road is one of the most challenging stages of the annual Paris–Nice and Tour Méditerranéen bicycle races. From 1952 to 1970, there was a Mont Faron hill climb time trial race.

Near the summit there is a zoo which covers an area of 1.5 hectares.

== Hill climb ==
Mont Faron hill climb top three places by year
Year	First	Second	Third
1952	Jean Dotto (FRA)	Giancarlo Astrua (ITA)	Roger Rondeaux (FRA)
1953	Jean Dotto (FRA)	Giancarlo Astrua (ITA)	Eugène Cavallero (FRA)
1954	Jean Dotto (FRA)	Louison Bobet (FRA)	Eugène Cavallero (FRA)
1955	Federico Bahamontes (ESP)	Adriano Salviatto (ITA)	Jean Dotto (FRA)
1956	José Gil Sole (ESP)	Jean Dotto (FRA)	Charly Gaul (LUX)
1957	Valentin Huot (FRA)	Adriano Salviatto (ITA)	Manuel Cruz (ESP)
1958	Charly Gaul (LUX)	Gilbert Salvador (FRA)	Claude Mattio (FRA)
1959	Roger Rivière (FRA)	Federico Bahamontes (ESP)	Valentin Huot (FRA)
1960	Tom Simpson (GBR)	José Gil Sole (ESP)	Valentin Huot (FRA)
1961	Raymond Poulidor (FRA)	Federico Bahamontes (ESP)	Jacques Anquetil (FRA)
1962	Federico Bahamontes (ESP)	Raymond Poulidor (FRA)	Manuel Manzano (FRA)
1963	Federico Bahamontes (ESP)	Gilbert Salvador (FRA)	Manuel Manzano (FRA)
1964	Federico Bahamontes (ESP)	Tom Simpson (GBR)	Claude Mattio (FRA)
1965	Jacques Anquetil (FRA)	Arie den Hartog (NED)	André Zimmermann (FRA)
1966	Raymond Poulidor (FRA)	Roger Pingeon (FRA)	Luis Ocaña (ESP)
1967	Lucien Aimar (FRA)	Julio Jiménez (ESP)	Paul Gutty (FRA)
1968	Charles Rigon (FRA)	Jacques Anquetil (FRA)	Roger Pingeon (FRA)
1969	No race		
1970	Bernard Thévenet (FRA)	Felice Gimondi (ITA)	Roger Pingeon (FRA)
