= Pierre Matignon =

French cyclist (1943–1987)

Personal information
- Full name: Pierre Bernard Jean René Matignon
- Born: 11 February 1943 Les Verchers-sur-Layon, France
- Died: 1 November 1987 (aged 44) Saint-Michel-de-Chavaignes, France

Cycling career
- Sport: Cycling
- Discipline: Road
- Role: Rider
- Rider type: Domestique

Professional teams
- 1969: Frimatic-Viva-de Gribaldy
- 1970: Fagor-Mercier
- 1971: Unknown
- 1972: Gitane

Major wins
- Grand Tours Tour de France 1 individual stage (1969)

Pierre Matignon (11 February 1943 – 1 November 1987) was the French racing cyclist is famous for finishing in last place in the 1969 Tour de France but winning one of its most prestigious stages alone while fighting off eventual race winner Eddy Merckx.

== Background ==
Pierre Matignon was a little-known rider in the Frimatic-De Gribaldy team during the Tour de France of 1969. As an amateur he had won a stage in the 1962 Tour de l'Avenir, the shorter version of the Tour de France for amateurs and semi-professionals. He had a modest career apart from that, with second and third places and a win at Brigueuil-le-Chantre in 1966 He then turned professional for a team run by the former rider, Louis Caput, who entered him for the Tour de France in his first season.

== 1969 Tour de France ==
The 1969 Tour de France had been an exceptional race and more than a third of the 130 starters had already dropped out by the 20th stage. Among those who had gone home were stars: they included Roger De Vlaeminck, Rik Van Looy and Luis Ocaña. The winner three years earlier, Lucien Aimar, was more than an hour behind. Jan Janssen, the winner in 1968, was at 48 minutes.

Those still riding, however, included Eddy Merckx, who led the race, the Frenchmen Raymond Poulidor and Roger Pingeon and the Italian, Felice Gimondi.

Matignon was 86th and last, three hours behind the leader. For much of the race he had competed not to win but to finish last, because the lanterne rouge - the back light of the race - often profited from sympathy in the contracts for round-the-houses races that followed the Tour. In that competition, he was challenged by André Wilhem of the rival Sonolor team. On the 20th day, from Brive to the summit of the Puy-de-Dôme near Clermont-Ferrand, Wilhem realised he could not go slower than Matignon and so he attacked right from the start.

The others finally caught him, there was a lull before Pingeon tried an attack, and then the race settled into a long ride across the heat of central France. Everyone was grateful for a breather, said the reporter Jacques Augendre. The decision for the stars would come on the coiling road that ran like a helter-skelter up the old volcano on which the day finished. They had only to watch each other.

Matignon had punctured while Wilhem was riding clear and, deemed unworthy of help from his team, had ridden on alone behind the race. Eventually he caught it, rode with it for a while, then attacked on the hill at Chavanon where the race slowed down with 66 km to go to take cloth bags of food. He gained three minutes in 20 km, the others taking him no more seriously off the front than they had when he was off the back. Four riders set off to chase when he had five minutes with 30 km left to ride but two were his own team-mates hindering rather than helping the chase. He had seven and a half minutes' lead with 20 km to go.

now any rider in the race ccould win a stage to the top of the Puy-de-Dôme, a mountain which entered the legend of the Tour five years earlier after a duel there between Poulidor and Jacques Anquetil.

The Peugeot team set off the real chase to defend Pingeon's second place as Matignon grew more tired. His lead with 10 km to go had fallen to two kilometres. Merckx joined the chase and rode so hard that only Poulidor and Matignon's team-mate, Paul Gutty from Lyon, could stay with him. Merckx could see Matignon by the time he turned on to the private road that rose five kilometres at 12.5 per cent. Merckx accelerated again when he got to 500 metres and first Gutty and then Poulidor couldn't keep up. Matignon struggled, zigzagging to keep going on the slope. He never looked back until the hundred metres of flat road at the top, when he knew he had won. He raised one hand in brief salute, loosened his feet from the pedals and freewheeled across the line.

Pierre Chany wrote:

The night before, the photographers on the race had gone off to buy material with which to make a Chinese lantern they could offer to Louis Caput's novice. But the symbolic light changed destination: it hung instead from the saddle of Wilhem, the rider from Lorraine (region) who had lost more than 10 minutes on Matignon and now occupied last place.

Matignon finished the Tour 85th He rode once more, in 1972, and came 75th. He raced as a professional from 1969 to 1972 and died when he was 44.

== Major results ==
1966
1st Brigueil-le-Chantre
1969
Tour de France

1st Stage 20
