= Derek Harrison (cyclist) =

British cyclist (1944–2018)

Personal information
- Born: 5 March 1944 Birmingham, England
- Died: 15 May 2018 (aged 74) Pernes-les-Fontaines, France

Cycling career
- Sport: Cycling
- Discipline: Road
- Role: Rider

Professional teams
- 1968–1969: Frimatic–Wolber–de Gribaldy
- 1970: Fagor–Mercier–Hutchinson
- 1971–1974: TI–Raleigh

Derek Harrison (5 March 1944 – 15 May 2018) was a British cyclist. He competed in the individual road race and team time trial events at the 1964 Summer Olympics as well as the 1968 and 1969 Tour de France.

== Major results ==
1967
2nd Paris–Troyes
9th Overall Tour de l'Avenir
1968
1st Mountains classification, Tour de Suisse
8th Tour de l'Hérault
1969
5th Overall Grand Prix du Midi Libre

1st Stage 4a

6th Genoa–Nice
1970
4th Gran Premio Valencia
1971
2nd Grand Prix de Cannes
1972
3rd Road race, National Road Championships
1973
3rd Grand Prix de Monaco

=== Grand Tour general classification results timeline ===
Grand Tour	1968	1969
Vuelta a España	—	—
Giro d'Italia	—	—
Tour de France	DNF	32

Legend
—	Did not compete
DNF	Did not finish
