= Francis Rigon =

French cyclist

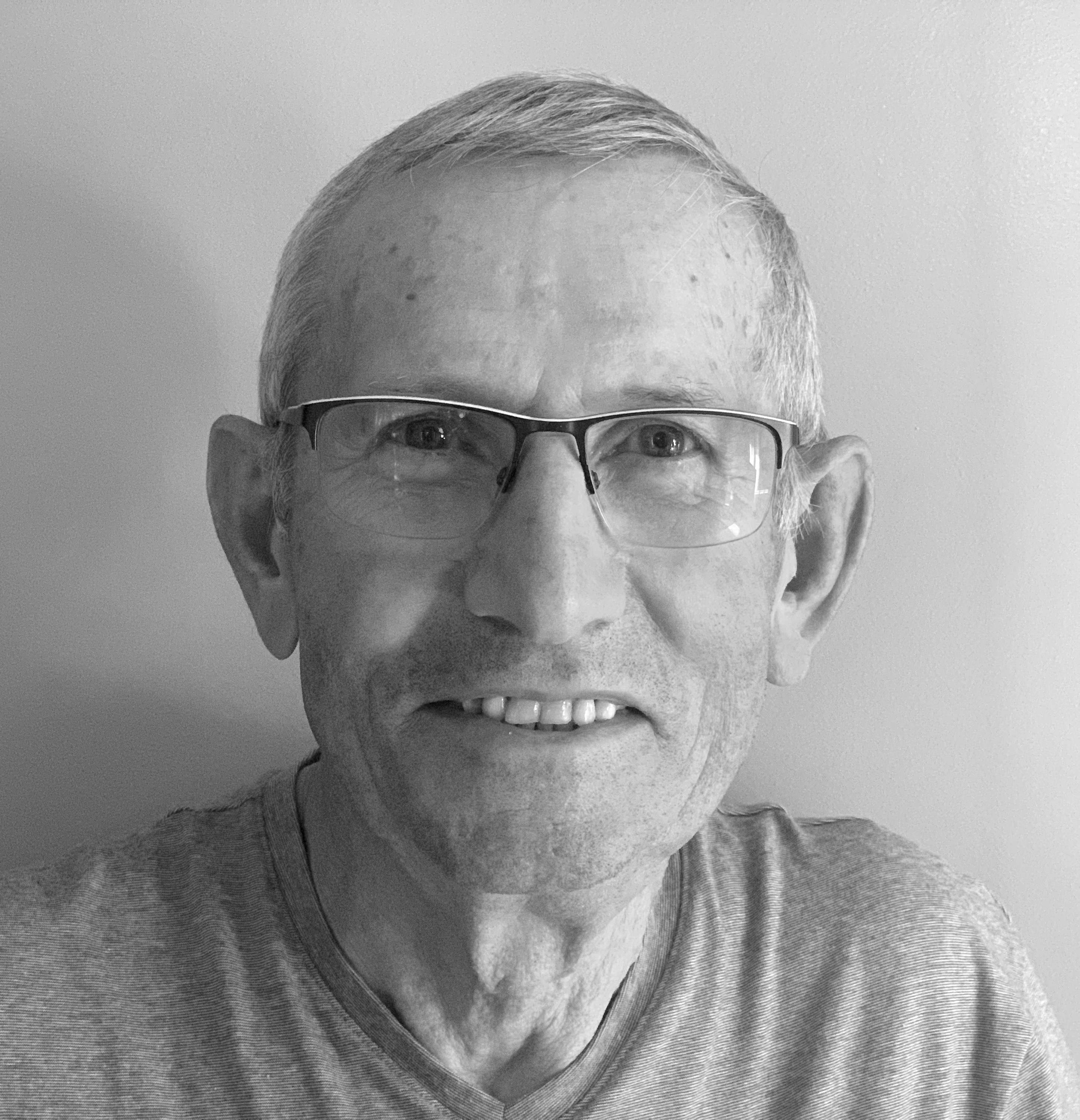
- Francis Rigon (September 2020)

Personal information
- Born: 3 January 1944 (age 82) Gallio, Italy

Cycling career
- Sport: Cycling
- Role: Rider

Francis Rigon (born 3 January 1944) is a French former racing cyclist. He rode in the 1969 Tour de France.
