= Stéphan Abrahamian =

French cyclist

Personal information
- Born: 5 September 1946 (age 80) Marseille, France

Cycling career
- Sport: Cycling
- Role: Rider

Stéphan Abrahamian Gonzalez (born 5 September 1946) is a French former cyclist. He competed in the individual road race at the 1968 Summer Olympics, finishing in fourth place and became French national amateur champion on the road race in 1968.

In 1969, Abrahamian became a professional rider for Sonolor, and rode the 1969 Tour de France. He also rode in the 1970 Tour de France.
