= Andrés Gandarias =

Spanish cyclist

Andres Gandarias
Personal information
- Full name: Andres Gandarias
- Born: 24 April 1943 Ibarrurin, Spain
- Died: 27 May 2018 (aged 75) Durango, Spain

Cycling career
- Sport: Cycling
- Discipline: Road
- Role: Rider

Andres Gandarias (24 April 1943 – 27 May 2018) was a Spanish professional road bicycle racer. He finished in the top 10 of the Tour de France twice.

== Palmarès ==
1968
Tour de France:

9th place overall classification

1969
Basauri
Tour de France:

5th place overall classification
