= Harm Ottenbros =

Dutch cyclist (1943–2022)

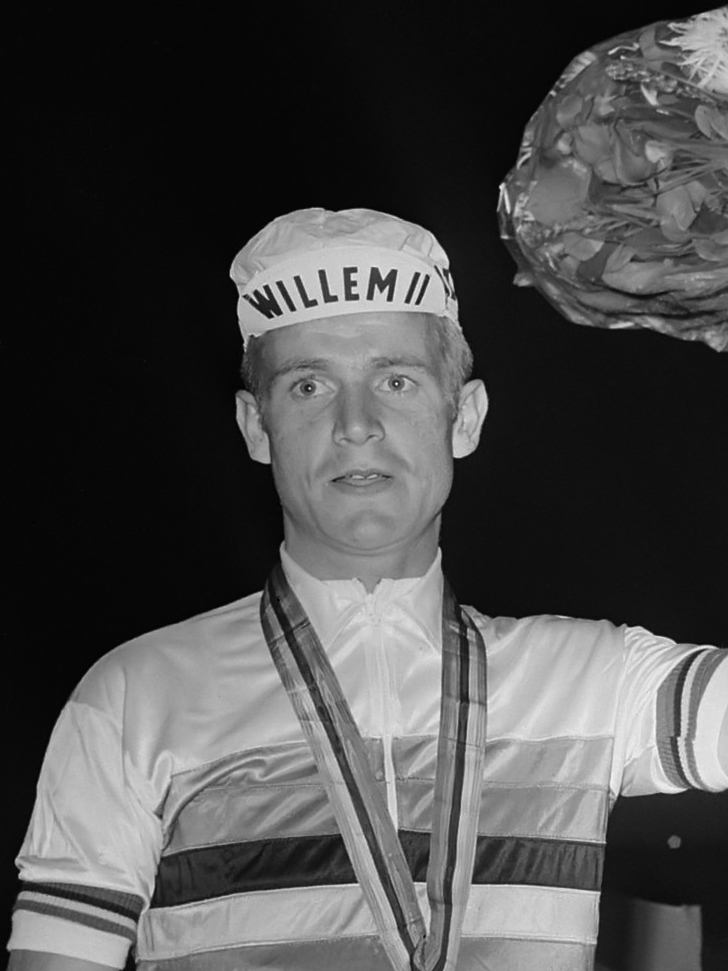
- Ottenbros in 1969

Personal information
- Born: 27 June 1943 Alkmaar, Netherlands
- Died: 4 May 2022 (aged 78) Strijen, Netherlands

Cycling career
- Sport: Cycling
- Discipline: Road
- Role: Rider
Medal record
Men's road bicycle racing
Representing the Netherlands
World Championships
Gold medal – first place	1969 Zolder	Elite Men's Road Race

Harm Ottenbros (27 June 1943 – 4 May 2022) was a Dutch road bicycle racer who raced as a professional from 1967 to 1976. His sporting career began with DTS Zaandam. Ottenbros is best remembered for capturing the gold medal and rainbow jersey at the 1969 world cycling championship road race in Zolder, Belgium. The relatively unknown Ottenbros edged Julien Stevens of Belgium by a few centimetres to take the victory.

== World champion ==
Harm Ottenbros was a late selection for the Netherlands' team for the world cycling championship after its leader, Jan Janssen, fell ill. The Dutch federation, the KNWU, needed a replacement and Ottenbros made up the numbers. He did not lack good results and was a good sprinter, having finished twice runner-up during the Tour de France: at Bordeaux, behind Barry Hoban, and Montargis, behind Herman Van Springel.

World cycling was dominated at the time by the Belgian champion Eddy Merckx, whose repeated victories had won him a number of enemies. "When you know how much Merckx is earning in this race", the French champion Raymond Delisle said during that year's Midi Libre, "you lose the will to compete for just the leftovers." In the world championship, reporters assessed, some riders were keener on stopping Merckx from winning than on winning themselves.

L'Équipe reported: "This world championship, just as we'd forecast, was held to ransom right from the start by the formula of national teams, by disagreements among the Belgians, and by the order of battle, which was to stop Eddy Merckx winning. For him, the best of all in terms of absolute talent, the problem looked insoluble. And it was. So the winner of the Tour de France, crushed by numbers, paralysed by the hunting-wolves of the peloton, Marino Basso among them, left the race on the last lap so that his name never even figured in the results. A number of the 150,000 fans in the Zolder motor-racing circuit jeered and whistled as they saw him step off.

The race then fell into a lull of uncertainty. The two biggest riders, Roger De Vlaeminck of Belgium and the Dutch sprinter Gerben Karstens, held each other in checkmate. The Belgian couldn't attack without taking Karstens with him and being outsprinted but Karstens couldn't risk a break and the ignominy of having De Vlaeminck power past him. Neither would give the other a centimetre.

Profiting from the problem, Ottenbros broke clear with Julien Stevens, champion of Belgium the previous year and a stage winner in the 1969 Tour de France but little else. They stayed away until the line, went to a straight sprint and Ottenbros won on the inside by centimetres, throwing his head down like a track rider and not lifting it again for a couple of seconds.

"It was an odd feeling", he said years later. "The nearer the finish line came, the more I had to tell myself I was just in a kermesse, although with a few more spectators than usual. I had to forget that I was riding for a world title because if I'd realised that, I'd never have won."

"The race needed a winner", wrote the French journalist Pierre Chany, "and it was Ottenbros: Ottenbros, who finished the Tour de France in 78th place, three hours behind the yellow jersey… He was escorted to the podium by just his team manager and two policemen."

Astonishly enough, the Gerrit Schulte Trofee, which rewards the best Dutch cyclist of the year, was not attributed in 1969, despite Ottenbros having won a major race.

The tone of Chany's reporting was just the start.

== The revenge of the stars ==
The world of cycling turned on Ottenbros. Some say they felt that an unknown had no right to the biggest prize, others that they were imposing the guilt they felt for denying the championship to Merckx. The only rider to congratulate him was Franco Bitossi, who rode up alongside him in the Tour of Flanders and said he admired what he had done. The gesture so moved Ottenbros that he gave him one of his rainbow jerseys.

Often he was lucky to get even start money. Riders jeered at his weakness on hills and called him The Eagle of Hoogerheide, an ironic reference to the climber Federico Bahamontes, the Eagle of Toledo, and to the unrelenting flatness of the south-west Netherlands where Ottenbros lived. "That nickname made me more famous than my world championship ever did", Ottenbros told L'Équipe. "And yet I was the strongest rider on the day. Or do you reckon that I bribed all the other 190 riders? Don't forget that they all wanted to be world champion as well. I raced and they didn't. I can't be held to blame if the stars of the day didn't take their chance."

In the Netherlands, fans deserted him, disappointed by the lack of further results. He broke his wrist in the Tour of Flanders at the start of the following season and could neither ride in his rainbow jersey nor defend his title. Then his team, Willem II–Gazelle, folded, victim of a ban on cigarette advertising. "Believe me", he says, "I wasn't in the slightest bit sorry when my year as world champion over and I didn't have to wear that jersey any more. I could just go back to being the unknown rider in village criteriums. But the old feeling never came back. I was never happy again."

== Later life ==
After his cycling career Ottenbros lived in Dordrecht, south of Rotterdam. He worked with mentally handicapped children and took up sculpting again, creating images of female nudes. He kept his rainbow jersey and medal in a cupboard. But for years he did not look at them. He made appearances with other bygone stars like Jan Janssen – whose absence from the world championship led to his downfall – and Jo de Roo. He remained a member of his original club, Alcmaria Victrix.

"If I could live my life all over again, I'd miss out the cycling bit", he told L'Équipe.

== Major achievements ==
1967
1st, Stage 5, Tour de Suisse
1968
1st, Stage 3b, Tour de Suisse
1969
1st (Gold Medal), World Cycling Championships Road Race
1st, Stage 2, Tour of Belgium

1st, Points classification

1970
1st, Stage 2, Tour de Luxembourg
1972
1st, GP Stad Vilvoorde
