= Mourenx =

- Commune
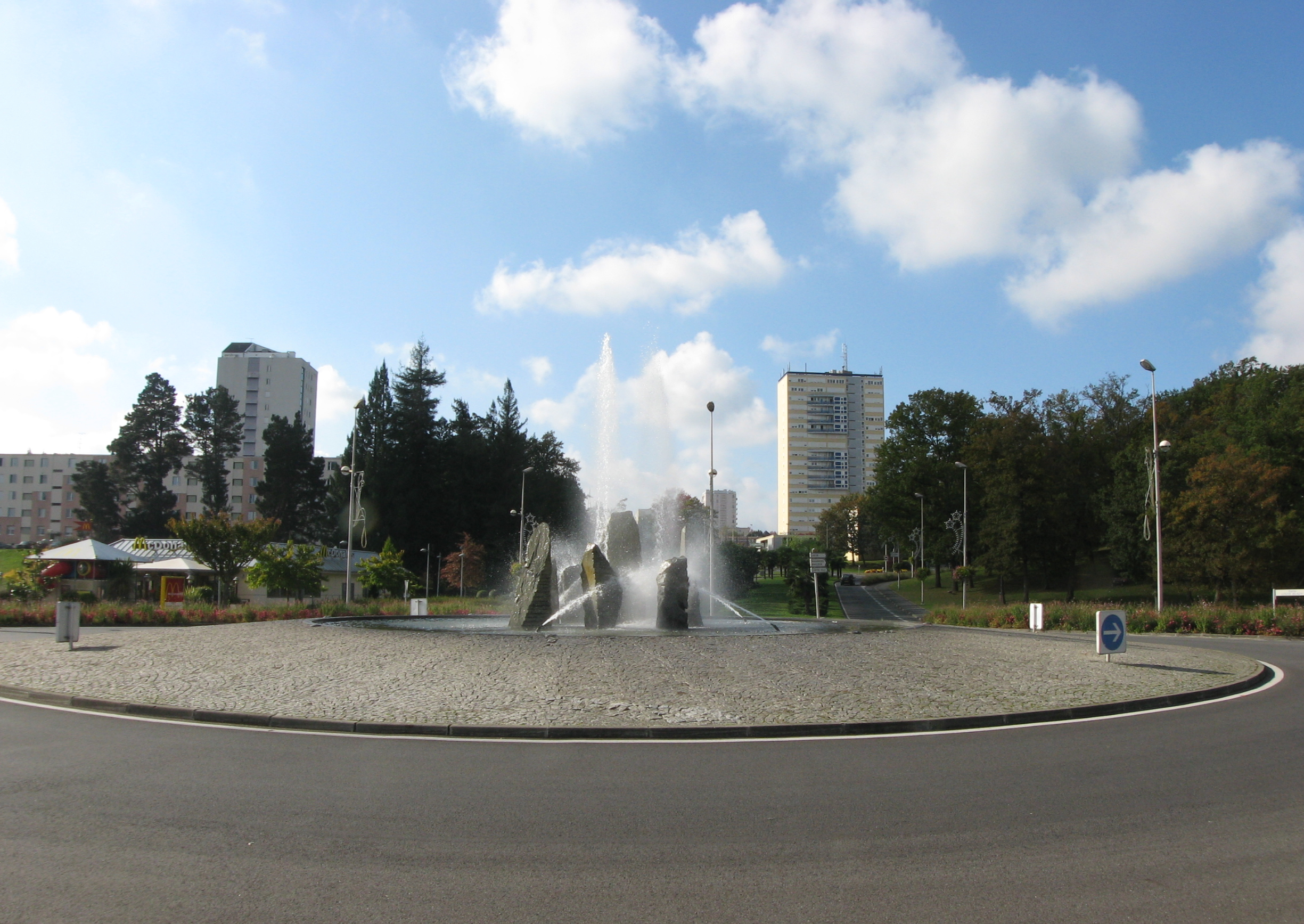
- Main route entering Mourenx

- Coat of arms
- Location of Mourenx
- Location within France Location within Nouvelle-Aquitaine
- Coordinates: 43°22′46″N 0°36′25″W
- Country: France
- Region: Nouvelle-Aquitaine
- Department: Pyrénées-Atlantiques
- Arrondissement: Pau
- Canton: Le Cœur de Béarn
- Intercommunality: Lacq-Orthez

Government
  - Mayor (2020–2026): Patrice Laurent
- Area^{1}: 6 km^{2} (2.3 sq mi)
- Elevation: 105 m (344 ft)
- Highest elevation: 182 m (597 ft)
- Lowest elevation: 95 m (312 ft)
- Population (2023): 5,695
  - Density: 950/km^{2} (2,500/sq mi)
- Time zone: UTC+01:00 (CET)
  - Summer (DST): UTC+02:00 (CEST)
- INSEE/Postal code: 64410 /64150
- ^{1} French Land Register data, which excludes lakes, ponds, glaciers > 1 km^{2} (0.386 sq mi or 247 acres) and river estuaries.

Mourenx (French pronunciation: [muʁɛ̃ks]; Occitan: Morencs) is a commune in the Pyrénées-Atlantiques department in south-western France.

== History ==
A settlement of Mourengs existed in the eleventh century. A secular abbey existed, belonging to the Viscount of Béarn. In 1385 the village had 27 hearths.

Natural gas deposits were discovered in nearby Lacq in 1951. A new town was constructed in 1958 to provide accommodation for the workers required at the gas processing plant. The town was designed by architects and urbanists Coulon, Douillet and Maneval. It consisted of three groups of collective housing, three groups of family housing, all around a central area of support facilities.

The well-known French sociologist Henri Lefebvre carried out a study of Mourenx and its inhabitants at the time of its creation.

== Population ==
Historical population
Year	Pop.	±% p.a.
1968	10,734	—
1975	9,469	−1.78%
1982	9,036	−0.67%
1990	7,460	−2.37%
1999	7,576	+0.17%
2007	7,549	−0.04%
2012	6,970	−1.58%
2017	6,485	−1.43%
2023	5,695	−2.14%
Source: INSEE

== See also ==
- Communes of the Pyrénées-Atlantiques department
