= Julien Stevens =

Belgian cyclist

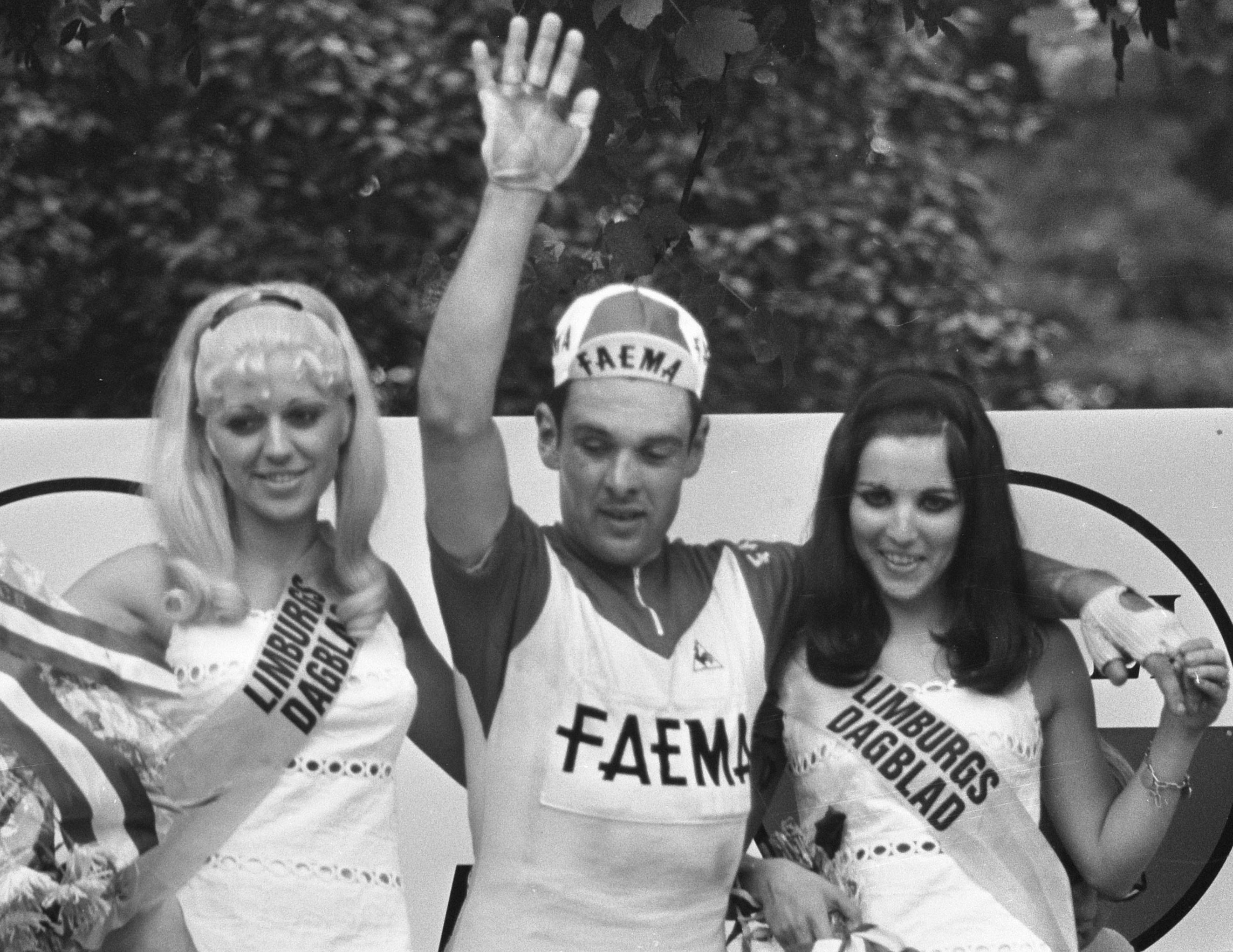
- Julien Stevens at the 1969 Tour de France

Personal information
- Full name: Julien Stevens
- Born: 25 February 1943 (age 83) Mechelen, Belgium

Cycling career
- Sport: Cycling
- Disciplines: Road and track
- Role: Rider
- Rider type: Sprinter

Major wins
- Grand Tours Tour de France 1 individual stage (1969) Vuelta a España 1 individual stage (1975) One-day races and Classics National Road Race Championships (1968)
Medal record
Representing Belgium
Men's road bicycle racing
World Championships
Silver medal – second place	1969 Zolder	Elite Road Race

Julien Stevens (born 25 February 1943) is a retired Belgian cyclist who raced from 1963 to 1977. Stevens spent most part of his career employed to help other riders, such as Rik Van Steenbergen, Rik Van Looy and Eddy Merckx. In 1969, at the road world championship in Zolder he got clear with Dutchman Harm Ottenbros but lost the sprint.

Stevens was also active in track cycling, where he was Belgian national champion in many competitions.

== Major results ==
1966
1st Stage 5 Volta a Catalunya

1968
1st Road Race, Belgian National Road Race Championships
1st Individual Pursuit, Belgian National Track Cycling Championships
1st Grand Prix Pino Cerami

1969
1st Stage 8 Tour de Suisse
1st Stage 2 Tour de France
2nd Road race, UCI Road World Championships

1972
1st Six Days of Ghent (with Patrick Sercu)
1st Six days of Montréal

1973
1st Omnium, Belgian National Track Cycling Championships
1st Team Pursuit, Belgian National Track Cycling Championships

1974
1st Six Days of Ghent (with Graeme Gilmore)
1st Stage 5a Tour of Belgium

1975
1st stage 19 Vuelta a España

1976
1st Half Fond, Belgian National Track Cycling Championships
