= Roger Pingeon =

French cyclist

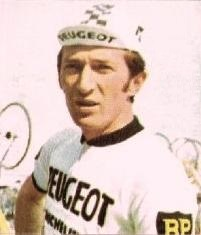
- Pingeon in 1972

Personal information
- Nicknames: Le grand échassier (The Great Stilt Walker); Le plombier-zingueur (The Plumber)
- Born: 28 August 1940 Hauteville-Lompnes, Vichy France
- Died: 19 March 2017 (aged 76) Beaupont, France
- Height: 182 cm (6 ft 0 in)
- Weight: 72 kg (159 lb)

Cycling career
- Sport: Cycling
- Discipline: Road
- Role: Rider

Professional teams
- 1965–1972: Peugeot–BP–Michelin
- 1973: Rokado–De Gribaldy
- 1974: Jobo–Lejeune

Major wins
- Grand Tours Tour de France General classification (1967) 4 individual stages (1967, 1968, 1969) Combativity award (1968) Vuelta a España General classification (1969) 2 individual stages (1969)

Roger Pingeon (pronounced [ʁɔʒe pɛ̃ʒɔ̃]; 28 August 1940 – 19 March 2017) was a French professional road bicycle racer.

== Biography ==
Growing up near the Jura Mountains, he was a cross-country skier as a teenager before taking up bicycle racing. He spent two years in Algeria on military service before starting his professional cycling career relatively late. He raced as a professional from 1964 to 1974. In 1967, Pingeon won the Tour de France. In 1969, Pingeon won the Vuelta a España and finished second behind Eddy Merckx in the Tour de France. He took a total of four Tour de France stage wins and finished in the top five of the race's general classification three times during his career. After retiring from competition he worked as a consultant for Radio Télévision Suisse between 1979 and 1998. Pingeon died on 19 March 2017 at his home in the village of Beaupont in the Ain department, about 100 km away from his hometown of Hauteville-Lompnes, after suffering a heart attack.

== Major results ==
1965
2nd Coppa Agostoni
2nd Grand Prix de la Trinité
5th Grand Prix des Nations
5th Overall Critérium du Dauphiné Libéré
7th Overall Grand Prix du Midi Libre
9th Overall Circuit du Provençal
1966
2nd Overall Critérium National de la Route

1st Stage 2

2nd Mont Faron Hill Climb
4th Grand Prix des Nations
7th Gran Premio di Lugano
8th Overall Tour de France
1967
1st Overall Tour de France

1st Stage 5a

2nd Overall Grand Prix du Midi Libre
2nd Circuit de l'Aulne
3rd Genoa–Nice
4th Circuit des Boucles de la Seine
4th Grand Prix de Monaco
5th À travers Lausanne
5th Gran Premio di Lugano
5th Trofeo Baracchi (with Raymond Poulidor)
6th Paris–Tours
7th Overall Escalada a Montjuïc
7th Paris–Tours
8th Overall Paris–Luxembourg

1st Stage 2

1968
2nd Road race, National Road Championships
3rd Critérium National de la Route
3rd Mont Faron Hill Climb
3rd Baden-Baden (with Charly Grosskost)
5th Overall Tour de France

1st Stage 15 & 18
Combativity award Overall

7th Overall Giro di Sardegna
7th Liège–Bastogne–Liège
9th Overall Tour de Luxembourg
9th Tour de l'Hérault
1969
1st Overall Vuelta a España

1st Stage 12 & 14b (ITT)

1st Flèche Enghiennoise
2nd Overall Tour de France

1st Stage 9

3rd Overall Critérium du Dauphiné Libéré

1st Mountains classification

4th Overall À travers Lausanne
9th Overall Paris–Nice
10th Overall Escalada a Montjuïc
1970
2nd Overall Critérium du Dauphiné Libéré
3rd Grand Prix de Saint-Raphaël
3rd Mont Faron Hill Climb
4th Overall Critérium National de la Route
4th Tour du Haut Var
4th Grand Prix de Monaco
9th Polymultipliée
10th Tour de l'Hérault
1971
3rd Coppa Agostoni
3rd Trophée Baracchi (with Bernard Thévenet)
5th Grand Prix des Nations
10th Grand Prix d'Isbergues
1972
Critérium du Dauphiné Libéré

1st Prologue (TTT) & Stage 1

2nd Overall Tour de Suisse
5th Overall Tour de Romandie

1st Prologue (TTT)

7th Overall Paris–Nice
9th Étoile de Bessèges
1974
1st Grand Prix de Plumelec
5th Overall Critérium du Dauphiné Libéré
6th Critérium National de la Route

=== Grand Tour general classification results timeline ===
Grand Tour	1965	1966	1967	1968	1969	1970	1971	1972	1973	1974
Vuelta a España	—	—	—	—	1	—	—	—	DNF	—
Giro d'Italia	—	—	DNF	DNF	—	—	—	—	—	—
Tour de France	12	8	1	5	2	DNF	—	DNF	—	11

Legend
—	Did not compete
DNF	Did not finish
