= Edy Schütz =

Luxembourgish cyclist (born 1941)

Personal information
- Full name: Edy Schütz
- Born: 15 May 1941 (age 85) Tetange, Luxembourg

Cycling career
- Sport: Cycling
- Discipline: Road
- Role: Rider

Major wins
- 1 stage Tour de France 1966

Edy Schütz (born 15 May 1941) is a Luxembourgish former professional road bicycle racer. In 1964, Schütz rode in the individual road race at the 1964 Olympic Games. From 1966 to 1971 he was six times the Luxembourgish national road race champion. In 1966, he won a stage in the 1966 Tour de France.

== Major results ==
1964
Österreich-Rundfahrt
1966
Luxembourg national road race champion
Tour de Luxembourg
Tour de France:

Winner stage 18

1967
Luxembourg national road race champion
1968
Luxembourg national road race champion
Tour de Luxembourg
1969
Luxembourg national road race champion
1970
Luxembourg national road race champion
Tour de Luxembourg
1971
Luxembourg national road race champion
