= Pierfranco Vianelli =

Italian cyclist (1946–2026)

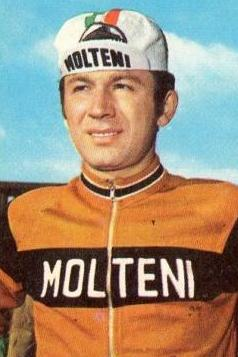

Personal information
- Full name: Pierfranco Vianelli
- Born: 20 October 1946 Provaglio d'Iseo, Italy
- Died: 8 September 2026 (aged 79) Provaglio d'Iseo, Italy

Cycling career
- Sport: Cycling
- Current team: Retired
- Role: Rider
Medal record
Representing Italy
Men's road bicycle racing
Olympic Games
Gold medal – first place	1968 Mexico City	Individual road race
Bronze medal – third place	1968 Mexico City	Team time trial

Pierfranco Vianelli (20 October 1946 – 8 September 2026) was an Italian cyclist and Olympic Champion. He won a gold medal at the 1968 Olympic Games in Mexico City, in the Individual Road Race. He also won a bronze medal in the Team Time Trial. Vianelli died on 8 September 2026, at the age of 79.
