= Frimatic–de Gribaldy =

French professional cycling team

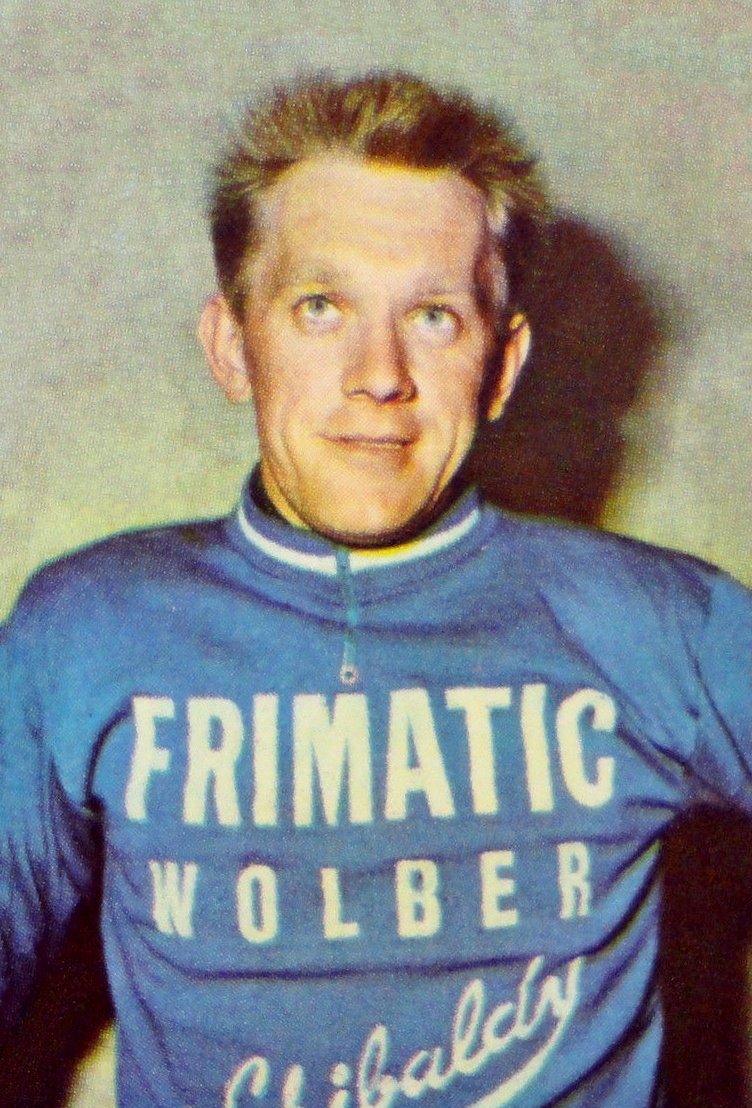
- Robert Hagmann in 1968

Team information
- Registered: France
- Founded: 1968
- Disbanded: 1971
- Discipline: Road

Team name history
- 1968 1969 1969 (Tour de France) 1970 1971: Frimatic–Wolber–de Gribaldy; Frimatic–Viva–de Gribaldy; Frimatic–de Gribaldy–Viva–Wolber; Frimatic–de Gribaldy; Hoover–de Gribaldy–Wolber

Frimatic–de Gribaldy was a French professional cycling team that existed from 1968 to 1971. It was created by former rider Jean de Gribaldy. Its main sponsor was French refrigerator manufacturer Frimatic.
