= Jean-Claude Theillière =

French cyclist

Personal information
- Full name: Jean-Claude Theillière
- Born: 23 May 1944 (age 82) Blanzat, France

Cycling career
- Sport: Cycling
- Role: Rider

Jean-Claude Theillière (born 23 May 1944) is a former French racing cyclist. He won the French national road race title in 1966.
