= Paul Gutty =

French cyclist

Personal information
- Full name: Paul Gutty
- Born: 4 November 1942 Lyon, France
- Died: 27 August 2006 (aged 63) Oingt, France

Cycling career
- Sport: Cycling
- Role: Rider

Paul Gutty (4 November 1942 – 27 August 2006) was a French racing cyclist. He won the French national road race title in 1970.
