= Omloop der drie Provinciën =

Belgian cycling race

Race details
- Date: May, June, July
- Region: Brussels-Capital Region, Flanders (Belgium)
- English name: Circuit of 3 Provinces
- Local name(s): Omloop der drie Provinciën (in Dutch), Circuit des 3 Provinces (in French)
- Discipline: Road
- Competition: Cat. 1.2
- Type: One-day race

History
- First edition: 1947
- Editions: 35
- Final edition: 1982
- First winner: Valère Olivier (BEL)
- Final winner: Jean Van Der Stappen (BEL)

The Omloop der drie Provinciën was a Belgian post-WW II cycling race organized for the last time in 1982.

The course, variating between 185 and 225 km always ended in Avelgem, West Flanders.

The competition's roll of honor includes the successes of Rik Van Steenbergen, Briek Schotte and Walter Godefroot.

== Winners ==
| Year | Winner | Second | Third |
|---|---|---|---|
| 1947 | (Belgium) Valère Olivier | (Belgium) Albert Sercu | (Belgium) Roger Cnockaert |
| 1948 | (Belgium) Rik Van Steenbergen | (Belgium) Lode Anthonis | (Belgium) Jozef Van der Helst |
| 1949 | (Belgium) Maurice Van Herzele | (Belgium) Georges Desplenter | (Belgium) Lucien Vlaemynck |
| 1950 | (Belgium) Maurice Blomme | (Belgium) Arthur Mommerency | (Belgium) Emmanuel Thoma |
| 1951 | (Belgium) Albert Ramon | (Belgium) Karel De Baere | (Belgium) André Pieters |
| 1952 | (Belgium) Marcel Dierckens | (Belgium) Roger Decorte | (Belgium) Odiel Van den Meerschaut |
| 1953 | (Belgium) Jozef Lefevre | (Belgium) Arthur Mommerency | (Belgium) Gérard Buyl |
| 1954 | (Belgium) Briek Schotte | (Belgium) André Blomme | (Belgium) Karel De Baere |
| 1955 | (Belgium) Henri Denys | (Belgium) Buddy Demunster | (Belgium) Lionel Van Brabant |
| 1956 | (Belgium) Karel Clerckx | (Belgium) Ernest Sterckx | (Belgium) Marcel Ryckaert |
| 1957 | (Belgium) Joseph Hoevenaers | (Belgium) René Van Meenen | (Belgium) René Mertens |
| 1958 | (Belgium) Marcel Buys | (Belgium) Léopold Rosseel | (Belgium) Marcel Janssens |
| 1959 | (Belgium) Jozef Schils | (Belgium) Michel Van Aerde | (Belgium) Pieter Van der Plaetsen |
| 1960 | (Belgium) Julien Schepens | (Belgium) Frans Aerenhouts | (Belgium) Marcel Buys |
| 1961 | (Belgium) Michel Van Aerde | (Belgium) Gustaaf De Smet | (Belgium) Roger Vindevogel |
| 1962 | (Belgium) Gilbert Desmet | (Belgium) Joseph Verachtert | (Belgium) Rik Luyten |
| 1963 | (Belgium) Arthur Decabooter | (Belgium) Willy Raes | (Belgium) Willy Bocklant |
| 1964 | (Belgium) Léon Van Daele | (Belgium) Etienne Vercauteren | (Belgium) Georges Vandenberghe |
| 1965 | (Belgium) Etienne Vercauteren | (Belgium) Léopold Van Den Neste | (Belgium) Julien Stevens |
| 1966 | (Belgium) Auguste Verhaegen | (Belgium) Paul Somers | (Belgium) Eric Demunster |
| 1967 | (Belgium) Frans Brands | (Belgium) Joseph Mathy | (Belgium) Julien Stevens |
| 1968 | (Netherlands) Wim Dubois | (Belgium) Julien Stevens | (Belgium) Herman Vrijders |
| 1970 | (Belgium) Noël Vantyghem | (Belgium) Erik De Vlaeminck | (Belgium) Georges Vandenberghe |
| 1971 | (Belgium) Eddy Goossens | (Belgium) Georges Vandenberghe | (Belgium) Fernand Hermie |
| 1972 | (Belgium) Arthur Van De Vijver | (Belgium) Jacques Zwaenepoel | (Netherlands) Richard Bukacki |
| 1973 | (Belgium) Walter Godefroot | (Belgium) Alfons De Bal | (Belgium) Willy De Geest |
| 1974 | (Belgium) Lieven Malfait | (Belgium) Lucien De Brauwere | (Belgium) Marcel Omloop |
| 1975 | (Belgium) Dirk Baert | (Belgium) Serge Vandaele | (Belgium) Willy Van Malderghem |
| 1976 | (Belgium) Gustaaf Van Roosbroeck | (Netherlands) Jan Raas | (Belgium) Geert Malfait |
| 1977 | (Belgium) Jozef Jacobs | (Belgium) Eric Van de Wiele | (Belgium) Walter Planckaert |
| 1978 | (Belgium) Eric Jaques | (Belgium) Alfons De Bal | (Belgium) Frans Van Looy |
| 1979 | (Belgium) Rudy Colman | (Netherlands) Adrianus Schipper | (Belgium) Gery Verlinden |
| 1980 | (Belgium) Marc Demeyer | (Belgium) Pol Verschuere | (Belgium) Dirk Gilbert |
| 1981 | (Belgium) Alain Van Hoornweder | (Belgium) Marc Goossens | (Belgium) Johnny De Nul |
| 1982 | (Belgium) Jean Van Der Stappen | (Belgium) Dirk Baert | (Netherlands) Ad Oprins |
| 2017 | (Czech Republic) Tomáš Kopecký | (Norway) Kristian Klevjer | (United Kingdom) Louis Rose-Davies |
| 2018 | (Netherlands) Wessel Krul | (Netherlands) Edo Maas | (Belgium) Lennert Cappan |
| 2019 | (Netherlands) Olav Kooij | (Belgium) Alex Vandenbulcke | (Belgium) Witse Meeussen |
| 2022 | (Belgium) Sente Sentjens | (United States) Artem Shmidt | (Belgium) Kay De Bruyckere |
