= Omloop Mandel-Leie-Schelde =

- Logo to the 2023 edition

Race details
- Date: August
- Region: Flanders, Belgium
- Discipline: Road
- Competition: UCI Europe Tour
- Type: One-day race
- Web site: mandel-leie-schelde.site123.me

History
- First edition: 1945
- Editions: 76 (as of 2023)
- First winner: André Pieters (BEL)
- Most wins: Johan Museeuw (BEL) (3 wins)
- Most recent: Warre Vangheluwe (BEL)

Omloop Mandel-Leie-Schelde is a cycling race held annually in Belgium. It is part of UCI Europe Tour in category 1.1. The race, with a course variating between 160 and 190 kilometers, has Meulebeke, West Flanders as finish place.

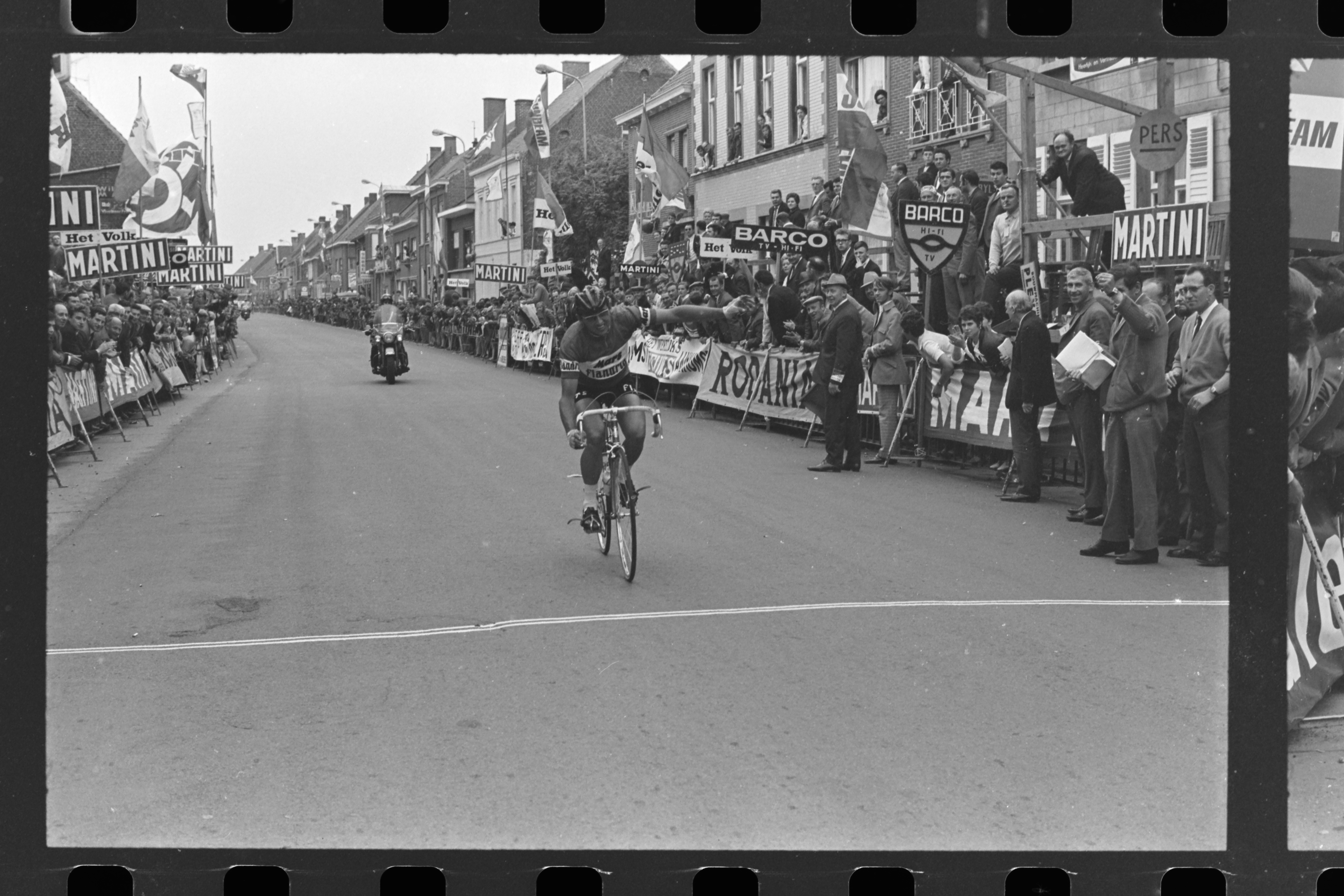
Wilfried David arriving solo in Meulebeke in the 1970 edition (collection KOERS Museum)

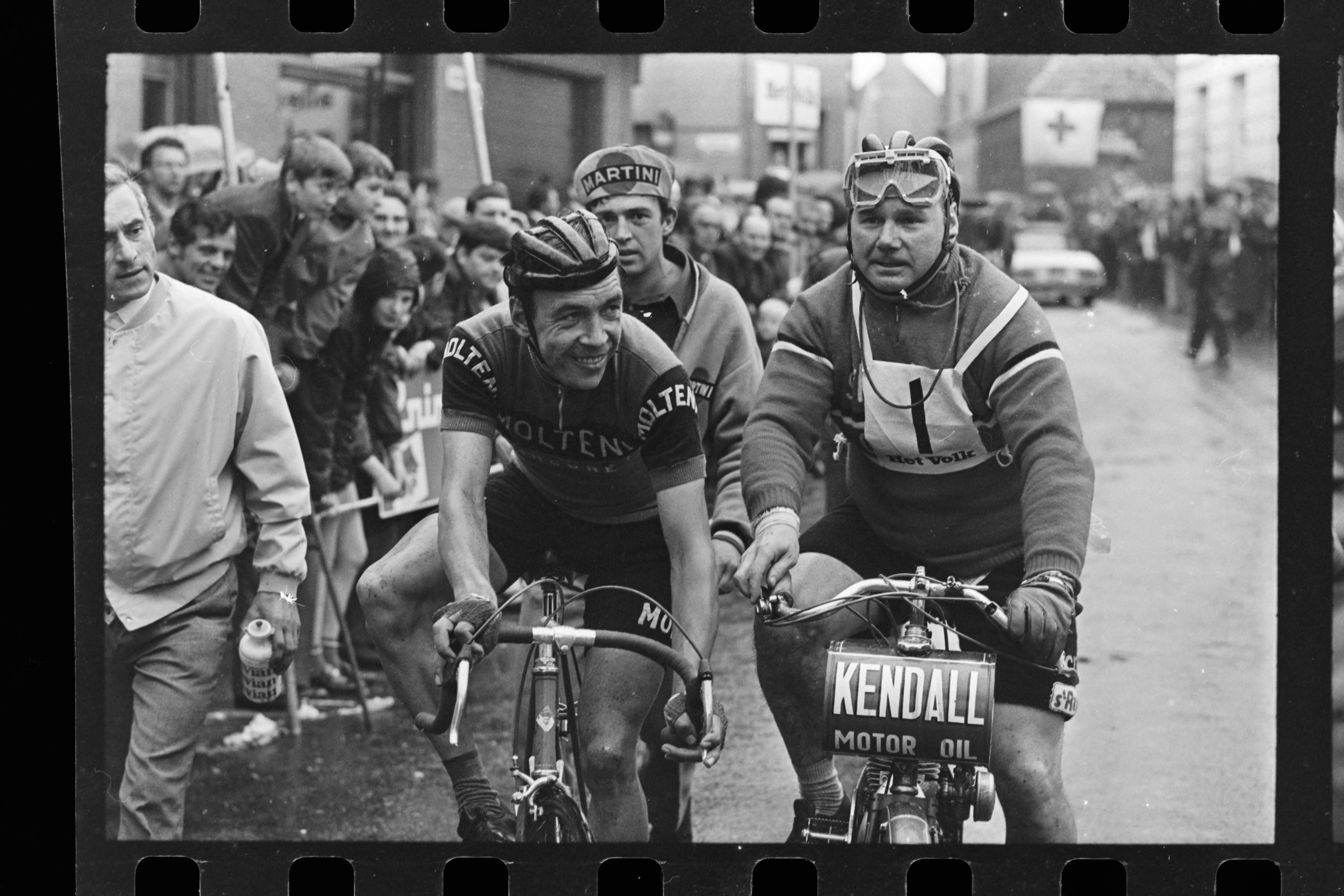
Herman Vanspringel next to his derny, after arriving in the 1971 edition (collection KOERS Museum)

== Winners ==
Year	Winner	Second	Third
1945	(Belgium) André Pieters	(Belgium) Albert Sercu	(Belgium) Jules Huvaere
1946	(Belgium) Alberic Schotte	(Belgium) Jan Landuyt	(Belgium) Jules Huvaere
1947	(Belgium) Michel Van Elsué	(Belgium) Arsene Rijckaert	(Belgium) Emmanuel Thoma
1948	(Belgium) Georges Desplenter	(Belgium) Maurice Desimpelaere	(Belgium) Albert Sercu
1949	(Belgium) Michel Remue	(Belgium) Georges Desplenter	(Belgium) André Pieters
1950	(Belgium) Albert Decin	(Belgium) Robert Nolf	(Belgium) Ward Van Dijck
1951	(Belgium) Emmanuel Thoma	(Belgium) Raphael Glorieux	(Belgium) André Pieters
1952	(Belgium) Karel De Baere	(Belgium) Albert Ramon	(Belgium) Lode Wouters
1953	(Belgium) Andre Declerck	(Belgium) Omer Braekevelt	(Belgium) Valere Ollivier
1954	(Belgium) Maurice Blomme	(Belgium) Alberic Schotte	(Belgium) Marcel De Mulder
1955	(Netherlands) Wim van Est	(Belgium) Germain Derycke	(Belgium) Marcel De Mulder
1956	(Belgium) Germain Derycke	(Belgium) Lode Anthonis	(Belgium) Jos De Feyter
1957	(Belgium) Noel Fore	(Belgium) Jozef Schils	(Belgium) Lucien Taillieu
1958	(Belgium) Jos Hoevenaers	(Belgium) Petrus Oellibrandt	(Belgium) Frans Aerenhouts
1959	(Belgium) Frans Aerenhouts	(Belgium) Arthur Decabooter	(Belgium) Henri Van Den Bossche
1960	(Belgium) Julien Schepens	(Belgium) Joseph Planckaert	(Belgium) Frans De Mulder
1961	(Belgium) Petrus Oellibrandt	(Belgium) Jan Zagers	(Belgium) Alfons Hermans
1962	(Belgium) Leon Van Daele	(Belgium) Rene Vanderveken	(Republic of Ireland) Seamus Elliott
1963 (1)	(Belgium) Norbert Kerckhove	(Netherlands) Piet van Est	(Netherlands) Peter Post
1963 (2)	(Belgium) Robert Lelangue	(Belgium) Willy Raes	(Belgium) Clement Roman
1964	(Belgium) Gilbert De Smet	(Italy) Carmine Preziosi	(Belgium) Theo Nys
1965	(Belgium) Jan Nolmans	(Belgium) Joseph Mathy	(Belgium) Julien Haelterman
1966	(Belgium) Yvo Molenaers	(Belgium) Albert Van Vlierberghe	(Belgium) Jacques De Boever
1967	(Netherlands) Jan Harings	(Belgium) Norbert Kerckhove	(Belgium) Paul In 't Ven
1968	(Belgium) Jos Huysmans	(Belgium) Roger Cooreman	(Belgium) Roger Rosiers
1969	(Netherlands) Wim Schepers	(Belgium) Herman Vrijders	(Belgium) Remi Van Vreckom
1970	(Belgium) Wilfried David	(Belgium) Remi Van Vreckom	(Belgium) Romain Pauwels
1971	(Belgium) Eric Leman	(Belgium) Ronny Van De Vijver	(Belgium) Julien Stevens
1972	(Belgium) Christian Callens	(Belgium) Fernand Bruggeman	(Belgium) Georges Barras
1973	(Belgium) Willy Abbeloos	(Belgium) Guido Van Sweevelt	(Netherlands) Wim Kelleners
1974	(Belgium) Jose Vanackere	(Belgium) Frans Mintjens	(Belgium) Paul Lannoo
1975	(Belgium) Jos Gijsemans	(Belgium) Dirk Baert	(Belgium) Willy Van Malderghem
1976	(Belgium) Willem Peeters	(Belgium) Ward Janssens	(Belgium) Eric Van De Wiele
1977	(Belgium) Ludo Peeters	(Belgium) Eddy Vanhaerens	(Belgium) Frans Verhaegen
1978	(Belgium) Ludo Schurgers	(Belgium) Walter Naegels	(Netherlands) Martin Havik
1979	(Belgium) Ludo Peeters	(Belgium) Walter Godefroot	(Belgium) Michel Pollentier
1980	(Belgium) Lieven Malfait	(Belgium) William Tackaert	(Belgium) Eric Van De Wiele
1981	(Belgium) Walter Planckaert	(Belgium) Daniel Willems	(Belgium) Filip Van De Ghinste
1982	(Belgium) Gery Verlinden	(Belgium) Patrick Vermeulen	(Belgium) Marc Dierickx
1983	(Belgium) William Tackaert	(Australia) Allan Peiper	(Belgium) Luc Meersman
1984	(Belgium) Patrick Versluys	(Belgium) Martin Durant	(Belgium) Luc Meersman
1985	(Belgium) Rudy Dhaenens	(Belgium) Willy Teirlinck	(Belgium) Josef Lieckens
1986	(Belgium) Rudy Dhaenens	(Belgium) Ferdi Van Den Haute	(Belgium) Herman Frison
1987	(Belgium) Frans Maassen	(Belgium) John De Keukelaere	(Belgium) Edwin Bafcop
1988	(Belgium) Johan Devos	(Belgium) Peter Huyghe	(Belgium) Patrick Deneu
1989	(Belgium) Eddy Planckaert	(Belgium) Carlo Bomans	(Belgium) Pascal Elaut
1990	(Belgium) Benjamin Van Itterbeeck	(Netherlands) Adri van der Poel	(Belgium) Dirk De Wolf
1991	(Netherlands) Wilco Zuyderwijk	(Netherlands) Antoine Goense	(Belgium) Peter Huyghe
1992	(Netherlands) Danny Nelissen (Belgium) Wilfried Nelissen	(Netherlands) John Talen	(Belgium) Herman Frison
1993	(Belgium) Frank Van Den Abeele	(Russia) Viatcheslav Ekimov	(Belgium) Paul Haghedooren
1994	(Belgium) Wilfried Nelissen	(Belgium) Peter Van Petegem	(Belgium) Carlo Bomans
1995	(Belgium) Niko Eeckhout	(Netherlands) Léon van Bon	(Denmark) Lars Michaelsen
1996	(Belgium) Johan Museeuw	(Belgium) Frank Vandenbroucke	(Belgium) Wilfried Peeters
1997	(Belgium) Franky De Buyst	(Belgium) Stephane Hennebert	(Belgium) Hans De Clercq
1998	(Belgium) Jo Planckaert	(Australia) Patrick Jonker	(Netherlands) Maarten den Bakker
1999	(Belgium) Johan Museeuw	(Belgium) Michel Van Haecke	(Netherlands) Léon van Bon
2000	(Italy) Stefano Zanini	(Belgium) Jo Planckaert	(Belgium) Michel Van Haecke
2001	(Latvia) Romans Vainsteins	(Belgium) Jo Planckaert	(Belgium) Eric De Clercq
2002	(Belgium) Peter Van Petegem	(Belgium) Johan Museeuw	(Belgium) Tom Boonen
2003	(Belgium) Johan Museeuw	(Belgium) Marc Streel	(Belgium) Paul Van Hyfte
2004	(Belgium) Tom Boonen	(Belgium) Gorik Gardeyn	(Belgium) Nico Mattan
2005	(Belgium) Geert Omloop	(Belgium) Marc Wauters	(Belgium) Nico Mattan
2006	(Belgium) Leif Hoste	(Belgium) Niko Eeckhout	(Luxembourg) Fränk Schleck
2007	(Italy) Alessandro Ballan	(Belgium) Gorik Gardeyn	(Belgium) Gianni Meersman
2008	(Belgium) Stijn Devolder	(Belgium) Leif Hoste	(Belgium) Frederik Willems
2009	(Belgium) Nick Nuyens	(Netherlands) Steven de Jongh	(Belgium) Frederik Willems
2010	(Belgium) Jan Ghyselinck	(Belgium) Kurt Hovelynck	(Belgium) Guillaume Van Keirsbulck
2011	(Belgium) Davy Commeyne	(Belgium) Laurens De Vreese	(Belgium) Wim De Vocht
2012	(Belgium) Pieter Ghyllebert	(Belgium) Guillaume Van Keirsbulck	(Belgium) Frederic Verkinderen
2013	(Belgium) Iljo Keisse	(Belgium) Frederique Robert	(Belgium) Niko Eeckhout
2014	(Belgium) Jasper de Buyst	(Germany) Alexander Krieger	(Belgium) Jonas van Genechten
2015	(Belgium) Amaury Capiot	(Belgium) Gianni Meersman	(Belgium) Jelle Cant
2016	(Belgium) Pieter Vanspeybrouck	(United Kingdom) Christopher Latham	(Belgium) Amaury Capiot
2017	(Belgium) Iljo Keisse	(Netherlands) Huub Duyn	(Belgium) Maarten Wynants
2018	(Netherlands) Wouter Wippert	(Denmark) Herman Dahl	(France) Justin Jules
2019	(Italy) Niccolò Bonifazio	(Belgium) Timothy Dupont	(Belgium) Tom Van Asbroeck
2020–2021	Cancelled		
2022	(Republic of Ireland) Rory Townsend	(United Kingdom) Harry Tanfield	(Belgium) Ruben Apers
2023	(Belgium) Warre Vangheluwe	(Belgium) Lionel Taminiaux	(Italy) Andrea Raccagni
