= Omloop der Zuid-West-Vlaamse Bergen =

Belgian cycling race

Race details
- Date: July
- Region: Flanders, Belgium
- English name: Circuit of the South-West Mountains
- Local name(s): Omloop der Zuid-West-Vlaamse Bergen(in Dutch), Circuit des Monts du Sud-Ouest (in French)
- Discipline: Road
- Competition: Cat. 1.2
- Type: One-day race

History
- First edition: 1946
- Editions: 30
- Final edition: 1975
- First winner: Joseph Didden (BEL)
- Most wins: Valère Ollivier (BEL); (3 wins)
- Final winner: Willem Peeters (BEL)

The Omloop der Zuid-West-Vlaamse Bergen was a Belgian post-WW II cycling race organized for the last time in 1975.

The course, between 140 and 200 km, was situated in West Flanders, against the French border. Poperinge was both start and finish place.

The competition's roll of honor includes the successes of Jozef Planckaert and Jean-Pierre Monseré.

== Winners ==
Year	Winner	Second	Third
1946	(Belgium) Joseph Didden	(Belgium) Désiré Stadsbader	(Belgium) Maurice Desimpelaere
1947	(Netherlands) Theo Middelkamp	(Belgium) René Janssens	(Belgium) Lucien Matthijs
1948	(Belgium) Hilaire Couvreur	(Belgium) Odiel Van Den Meerschaut	(Belgium) Roger De Corte
1949	(Belgium) Georges Claes	(Belgium) Albert Ramon	(Belgium) Frans Loyaerts
1950	(Belgium) Lode Anthonis	(Belgium) André Pieters	(Belgium) Julien Van Dycke
1951	(Belgium) Valère Ollivier	(Belgium) Frans Loyaerts	(Belgium) Florent Rondelé
1952	(Belgium) Briek Schotte	(Belgium) Hilaire Couvreur	(Belgium) Léopold Degraeveleyn
1953	(Belgium) Valère Ollivier	(Belgium) Roger Desmet	(Belgium) Germain Derycke
1954	(Belgium) Valère Ollivier	(Belgium) André Maelbrancke	(Belgium) André Rosseel
1955	(Belgium) Jozef Planckaert	(Belgium) Lucien Demunster	(Belgium) André Rosseel
1956	(Belgium) Germain Derycke	(Belgium) Norbert Kerckhove	(Belgium) Henri Denys
1957	(Belgium) Norbert Kerckhove	(Belgium) Luc Taillieu	(Belgium) Henri Denys
1958	(Belgium) Emile Van Cauter	(Belgium) Adhémar De Blaere	(Belgium) Michel Deboodt
1959	(Belgium) Lucien Demunster	(Belgium) Willy Truye	(Belgium) André Messelis
1960	(Belgium) Romain Van Wynsberghe	(Netherlands) Bastiaan Maliepaard	(Belgium) Léon Van Daele
1961	(Belgium) Jaak De Boever	(Belgium) Karel Clerckx	(Belgium) Léopold Rosseel
1962	(Belgium) Noel Fore	(Belgium) André Noyelle	(Belgium) Oswald Declercq
1963	(Belgium) André Noyelle	(Belgium) Willy Raes	(Belgium) Alfons Hermans
1964	(Belgium) Georges Vandenberghe	(Belgium) Marcel Bostoen	(Belgium) Alfons Hermans
1965	(Belgium) Joseph Hoevenaers	(Belgium) André Messelis	(Belgium) Willy Bocklant
1966	(Belgium) Eric Demunster	(Belgium) Oswald Declercq	(Belgium) Herman Van Loo
1967	(Belgium) Eric Demunster	(France) René Chtiej	(Belgium) Daniel Van Ryckeghem
1968	(Belgium) Joseph Mathy	(Belgium) Willy Donie	(Belgium) Michel Jacquemin
1969	(Belgium) Willy De Geest	(Belgium) Joseph Timmerman	(Belgium) Noël Vantyghem
1970	(Belgium) Jean-Pierre Monseré	(Belgium) Roland Callewaert	(Belgium) Willy Donie
1971	(Belgium) Tony Gakens	(Belgium) Hugo De Raes	(Belgium) Raphaël Van Bruane
1972	(Belgium) Hervé Vermeeren	(Belgium) Christian Callens	(Belgium) Luc Van Goidshoven
1973	(Belgium) José Vanackere	(Belgium) Eddy Goossens	(Belgium) Eddy Moreels
1974	(Belgium) Rik Van Linden	(Belgium) Willy Planckaert	(Belgium) Noël Vantyghem
1975	(Belgium) Willem Peeters	(Belgium) José Vanackere	(Belgium) Léon Thomas
