= 1951 Omloop Het Volk =

Race details
- Dates: 11 March 1951
- Stages: 1
- Distance: 204 km (127 mi)
- Winning time: 5h 35' 10"

Results
| | Winner | Jean Bogaerts (BEL) |
| | Second | Lionel Van Brabant (BEL) |
| | Third | Raymond Impanis (BEL) |

The 1951 Omloop Het Volk was the seventh edition of the Omloop Het Volk cycle race and was held on 11 March 1951. The race started and finished in Ghent. The race was won by Jean Bogaerts.

== General classification ==
Final general classification
| Rank | Rider | Time |
|---|---|---|
| 1 | Jean Bogaerts (BEL) | 5h 35' 10" |
| 2 | Lionel Van Brabant (BEL) | + 1" |
| 3 | Raymond Impanis (BEL) | + 30" |
| 4 | André Maelbrancke (BEL) | + 35" |
| 5 | André Declerck (BEL) | + 35" |
| 6 | Gino Sciardis (FRA) | + 35" |
| 7 | Valère Ollivier (BEL) | + 35" |
| 8 | Frans Loyaerts (BEL) | + 35" |
| 9 | Jules Depoorter (BEL) | + 35" |
| 10 | André Pieters (BEL) | + 35" |
