= Omloop der Vlaamse Gewesten =

Recurring sporting event

Race details
- Date: March, April, May, June, September
- Region: Flanders, Brussels-Capital Region, Belgium
- English name: Circuit of the Flemish regions
- Local name(s): Omloop der Vlaamse gewesten (Dutch), Circuit des régions flamandes (French)
- Discipline: Road
- Type: One-day

History
- First edition: 1928
- Editions: 41
- Final edition: 1972
- First winner: Jules Van Hevel (BEL)
- Most wins: Louis Hardiquest (BEL) (2 wins)
- Final winner: Raf Hooyberghs (BEL)

The Omloop der Vlaamse gewesten was a men's cycling race of which the original format was organized for the last time in 1972. The race was run in variating Flemish provinces or Brussels.

The competition's roll of honor includes the successes of Rik Van Steenbergen, Briek Schotte and Rik Van Looy.

In overlapping years and afterwards, races with the same name were also organized for amateur and junior cyclists. The final editions were held in Wuustwezel, Antwerp.

== Winners ==
Year	Winner	Second	Third
1928	(Belgium) Jules Van Hevel	(Belgium) Joseph Dervaes	(Belgium) René Vermandel
1929	No race		
1930	(Belgium) Gérard Loncke	(Belgium) Alfred Hamerlinck	(Belgium) Jules Deschepper
1931	(Belgium) Joseph Demuysere	(Germany) Hermann Buse	(Belgium) Alfred Hamerlinck
1932	(Belgium) Alfons Deloor	(Belgium) Joseph Wauters	(Belgium) Frans Bonduel
1933	(Belgium) Louis Hardiquest	(Belgium) Edward Vissers	(Belgium) Denis Verschueren
1934	(Belgium) Louis Hardiquest	(Belgium) Frans Dictus	(Belgium) Gustaaf Van Slembrouck
1935	(Belgium) Camille Van Iseghem	(Belgium) Peter Lely	(Belgium) Romain Maes
1936	No race		
1937	(Belgium) Karel Terdago	(Belgium) Marcel Kint	(Belgium) Gérard Desmet
1938	(Belgium) Sylvain Grysolle	(Belgium) Constant Lauwers	(Belgium) Lucien Vlaeminck
1939	(Belgium) Romain Maes	(Belgium) Achiel Buysse	(Belgium) Sylvain Grysolle
1940	(Belgium) Albert Hendrickx	(Belgium) Frans Bonduel	(Belgium) Achiel Buysse
1941	(Belgium) Karel Kaers	(Belgium) Albert Henrdickx	(Belgium) Louis Van Espenhout
1942	(Belgium) Odiel Van Den Meerschaut	(Belgium) André Maelbrancke	(Belgium) Briek Schotte
1943	(Belgium) Richard Kemps	(Belgium) Kamiel Beeckman	(Belgium) André Declerck
1944	(Belgium) Rik Van Steenbergen	(Belgium) Désiré Stadsbaeder	(Belgium) Jef Moerenhout
1945	No race		
1946	(Belgium) Briek Schotte	(Belgium) André Pieters	(Belgium) Lucien De Vlaeminck
1947	(Belgium) Achiel Buysse	(Belgium) Gustaaf Van Overloop	(Belgium) Prosper Depredomme
1948	(Belgium) Albert Sercu	(Belgium) Marcel Ryckaert	(Belgium) Georges Claes
1949	(Belgium) André Declerck	(Belgium) Valère Ollivier	(Belgium) Camille Beeckman
1950	(Belgium) Ernest Sterckx	(Belgium) Raymond Impanis	(Belgium) Georges Claes
1951	(Belgium) Frans Sterckx	(Belgium) Gérard Buyl	(Belgium) André Declerck
1952	(Belgium) Eugeen Van Roosbroeck	(Belgium) Valère Ollivier	(Belgium) Ernest Sterckx
1953	(Belgium) René Mertens	(Belgium) Roger Desmet	(Belgium) Marcel Ryckaert
1954	(Belgium) Alfons Vandenbrande	(Belgium) René Mertens	(Belgium) Gaston De Wachter
1955	(Belgium) Ludo Van Der Elst	(Belgium) Roger Decock	(Belgium) Karel Van Dormael
1956	(Belgium) Roger Verplaetse	(Belgium) Roger Decock	(Belgium) Gilbert Desmet
1957	(Belgium) Jozef Schils	(Belgium) Pierre Machiels	(Belgium) Norbert Kerckhove
1958	(Belgium) André Auquier	(Belgium) Maurice Meuleman	(Belgium) Frans Aerenhouts
1959	(Belgium) Yvo Molenaers	(Netherlands) Mies Stolker	(Belgium) Marcel Janssens
1960	(France) Jean Forestier	(Belgium) Michel Van Aerde	(Belgium) André Noyelle
1961	(Belgium) André Vlayen	(Belgium) Gilbert Maes	(Belgium) Arthur De Cabooter
1962	(Belgium) Edgard Sorgeloos	(Belgium) Arthur De Cabooter	(Belgium) Jos Hoevenaers
1963	(Belgium) Rik Van Looy	(Belgium) Noël Fore	(Belgium) Frans Aerenhouts
1964	(Belgium) Gustaaf Desmet	(Belgium) Louis Troonbeckx	(Belgium) Benoni Beheyt
1965	(Belgium) Roger Baguet	(United Kingdom) Vincent Denson	(Belgium) Roger Deconinck
1966	(Belgium) Albert Van Vlierberghe	(Belgium) Jan Lauwers	(Netherlands) Gerben Karstens
1967	(Belgium) Arthur De Cabooter	(Belgium) Jos Haeseldonckx	(Belgium) Noël Fore
1968	(Belgium) Etienne Sonck	(Belgium) Roger Rosiers	(Belgium) Daniel Van Rijckeghem
1969	(Belgium) Frans Verbeeck	(Netherlands) Harry Steevens	(Belgium) Patrick Sercu
1970	(Belgium) André Dierickx	(Belgium) Frans Verbeeck	(Belgium) Herman Vrijders
1971	No race		
1972	(Belgium) Raphael Hooyberghs	(Belgium) Ronny Van De Vijver	(United Kingdom) Michael Wright

== Winners amateur and junior races ==
Year	Amateurs	Juniors
1944	(Belgium) Karel De Baere	No race
1945	No race	No race
1946	No race	No race
1947	(Belgium) Henri Van Kerckhove	No race
1948	No race	No race
1949	(Belgium) Boudewijn De Vos	No race
1950	(Belgium) Pierre Gosselin	No race
1951	(Belgium) Gilbert Verkaemer	No race
1952	(Belgium) Rik Van Looy	No race
1953	(Belgium) Victor Wartel	No race
1954	No race	No race
1955	(Belgium) Maurice Meuleman	No race
1956	(Belgium) Kamiel Buysse	No race
1957	(Belgium) Frans De Mulder	No race
1958	(Belgium) Frans Melckenbeek	No race
1959	(Belgium) Gilbert Maes	No race
1960	No race	No race
1961	No race	No race
1962	No race	No race
1963	(Belgium) Noël De Pauw	No race
1964	(Belgium) Jules Marinus	No race
1965	(Belgium) Antoon Houbrechts	No race
1966	(Belgium) Roger Rosiers	No race
1967	(Belgium) Robert Legein	No race
1968	(Belgium) Roland Callewaert	No race
1969	(Belgium) Jean-Pierre Monseré	No race
1970	(Belgium) Tony Gakens	No race
1971	(Belgium) Andre Peirsman	No race
1972	(Belgium) Erik Van Lent	No race
1973	(Belgium) Andre Coppens	No race
1974	(Belgium) Marc Renier	No race
1975	(Belgium) Etienne Van Der Helst	No race
1976	(Belgium) Rudy Colman	No race
1977	(Belgium) Daniel Wilems	No race
1978	(Belgium) Hendrik Caethoven	No race
1979	(Belgium) Eddy Coopmans	(Belgium) Ludo Adriaensen
1980	(Belgium) Eddy Planckaert	No race
1981	(Belgium) Francis Balhan	No race
1982	(Belgium) Eric Vanderaerden	No race
1983	(Belgium) Luc Andre	No race
1984	(Belgium) Roger Ilegems	No race
1985	(Belgium) Marc Sprengels	No race
1986	(Belgium) Benjamin Van Itterbeeck	No race
1987	(Belgium) Peter Huyge	(Belgium) Daniel Verelst
1988	(Belgium) Danny Lippens	(Belgium) Danny Daelman
1989	(Belgium) Luc Heuvelmans	(Belgium) Kurt Van Bulck
1990	(Belgium) Peter Farazijn	(Belgium) Gert Vanderaerden
1991	(Belgium) Jan Van Donink	(Belgium) Geert Verdeyen
1992	(Belgium) Eric Gijsemans	No race
1993	(Canada) Jacques Landry	(Belgium) Wesley Theunis
1994	(Belgium) Sebastian Van Den Abeele	(Belgium) Karel Vereecke
1995	(Belgium) Johan De Geyter	(Belgium) Tim De Peuter
1996	(Belgium) Geert Omloop	(Belgium) Johan Olbrechts
1997	(Belgium) Björn Leukemans	(Belgium) Bart Mariën
1998	(Netherlands) Stefan Van Dijk	(Belgium) Tom Braem
1999	(Belgium) Steven Tack	(Belgium) Kurt Van Bulck
2000	(Netherlands) Fulco van Gulik	No race
2001	No race	(Russia) Stanislav Belov
2002	(Netherlands) Hans Dekkers	(Belgium) Ingmar De Poortere
2003	(Netherlands) Kenny van Hummel	(Netherlands) Rick Fransen
2004	(Netherlands) Michiel Elijzen	(Netherlands) Cornelius Van Ooijen
2005	(Belgium) Evert Verbist	(Russia) Timofey Kritsky
2006	(Belgium) Bjorn Coomans	(Belgium) Jochen Engelen
2007	(Lithuania) Simas Kondrotas	(Belgium) Stijn Steels
2008	No race	(Netherlands) Yoeri Havik
2009	No race	(Belgium) Gert Lodewijks
2010	No race	(Netherlands) Maarten van Trijp
2011	No race	(Belgium) Boris Vallee
2012	No race	(Belgium) Aimé De Gendt
2013	No race	(Netherlands) Mitchell Cornelisse
2014	No race	(Denmark) Kasper Andersen
2015	No race	(Netherlands) Bram Welten
2016	No race	(Belgium) Gerben Thijssen
2017	No race	(Netherlands) Tim Bierkens
2018	No race	(Belgium) Jarne Van Grieken
2019	No race	(Netherlands) Hidde van Veenendaal
