= 1949 Omloop Het Volk =

Race details
- Dates: 13 March 1949
- Stages: 1
- Distance: 239 km (149 mi)
- Winning time: 7h 11' 00"

Results
	Winner	André Declerck (BEL)
	Second	Frans Leenen (BEL)
	Third	Maurice Mollin (BEL)

The 1949 Omloop Het Volk was the fifth edition of the Omloop Het Volk cycle race and was held on 13 March 1949. The race started and finished in Ghent. The race was won by André Declerck.

== General classification ==
Final general classification
Rank	Rider	Time
1	André Declerck (BEL)	7h 11' 00"
2	Frans Leenen (BEL)	+ 0"
3	Maurice Mollin (BEL)	+ 0"
4	Maurice Blomme (BEL)	+ 10"
5	Lode Anthonis (BEL)	+ 40"
6	Ernest Sterckx (BEL)	+ 2' 02"
7	Valère Ollivier (BEL)	+ 2' 02"
8	Désiré Keteleer (BEL)	+ 2' 02"
9	Emmanuel Thoma (BEL)	+ 2' 10"
10	Lionel Van Brabant (BEL)	+ 2' 10"
