= 1951 Tour of Flanders =

35th Tour of Flanders
- Event poster

Race details
- Dates: 1 April 1951
- Stages: 1
- Distance: 274 km (170.3 mi)
- Winning time: 7h 43' 03"

Results
	Winner	Fiorenzo Magni (ITA)	(Ganna)
	Second	Bernard Gauthier (FRA)	(Mercier–Hutchinson)
	Third	Attilio Redolfi (FRA)	(Mercier–A.Magne)

The 35th running of the Tour of Flanders cycling classic was held on Sunday, 1 April 1951. Italian Fiorenzo Magni won the race with a five-and-a-half minute lead over Frenchman Bernard Gauthier. It was Magni's third consecutive victory in the Tour of Flanders; the first and to date only rider to achieve this feat. 30 of 196 riders finished.

== Route ==
The race started in Ghent and finished in Wetteren – totaling 274 km. The course featured four categorized climbs:

- Kwaremont
- Kruisberg
- Edelareberg
- Muur van Geraardsbergen

== Results ==
Result
Rank	Rider	Team	Time
1	Fiorenzo Magni (ITA)	Ganna	7h 43' 03"
2	Bernard Gauthier (FRA)	Mercier–Hutchinson	+ 5' 35"
3	Attilio Redolfi (Note: Attilio Redolfi, born Italian, was naturalized French in 1949.) (FRA)	Mercier–A.Magne	+ 10' 32"
4	Loretto Petrucci (ITA)	Taurea	s.t.
5	Jean Baldassari (FRA)	Mercier–Le Greves	+ 11' 50"
6	Rik Van Steenbergen (BEL)	Mercier–Hutchinson	+ 12' 30"
7	Raymond Impanis (BEL)	Alcyon–Dunlop	+ 14' 06"
8	André Pieters (BEL)	Devos Sport	+ 15' 30"
9	André Declerck (BEL)	Bertin	+ 15' 50"
10	Valère Ollivier (BEL)	Mercier–Hutchinson	+ 18' 05"
