= 1946 Omloop van Vlaanderen =

Race details
- Dates: 17 March 1946
- Stages: 1
- Distance: 225 km (140 mi)
- Winning time: 6h 17' 00"

Results
	Winner	André Pieters (BEL)
	Second	Marcel Rijckaert (BEL)
	Third	Emmanuel Thoma (BEL)

The 1946 Omloop van Vlaanderen was the second edition of the Omloop van Vlaanderen cycle race and was held on 17 March 1946. The race started and finished in Ghent. The race was won by André Pieters.

== General classification ==
Final general classification
Rank	Rider	Time
1	André Pieters (BEL)	6h 17' 00"
2	Marcel Rijckaert (BEL)	+ 7"
3	Emmanuel Thoma (BEL)	+ 20"
4	Maurice Desimpelaere (BEL)	+ 20"
5	Karel Debaere (BEL)	+ 20"
6	Valère Ollivier (BEL)	+ 20"
7	Emile Faignaert (BEL)	+ 20"
8	Louis Nackaerts (BEL)	+ 20"
9	Triphon Verstraeten (BEL)	+ 20"
10	Omer De Keyser (BEL)	+ 20"
