= 1949 Tour of Flanders =

33rd Tour of Flanders
Race details
- Dates: 10 April 1949
- Stages: 1
- Distance: 260 km (161.6 mi)
- Winning time: 7h 21' 00"

Results
	Winner	Fiorenzo Magni (ITA)	(Ganna)
	Second	Valère Ollivier (BEL)	(Bertin–Wolber)
	Third	Briek Schotte (BEL)	(Alcyon–Dunlop)

The 33rd edition of the Tour of Flanders cycling classic took place on Sunday, 10 April 1949. Italian cyclist Fiorenzo Magni emerged victorious in a sprint finish involving 18 riders, with Belgians Valère Ollivier and Briek Schotte securing second and third place, respectively. Magni's victory marked the second time a non-Belgian rider had won the Tour of Flanders and also established him as the first Italian to achieve this feat. Out of the 225 participating riders, 52 successfully completed the race.

== Route ==
The race started in Ghent and finished in Wetteren – totaling 260 km. The course featured three categorized climbs:

- Kwaremont
- Kruisberg
- Edelareberg

== Results ==
Result
Rank	Rider	Team	Time
1	Fiorenzo Magni (ITA)	Ganna	7h 21' 00"
2	Valère Ollivier (BEL)	Bertin–Wolber	s.t.
3	Briek Schotte (BEL)	Alcyon–Dunlop	s.t.
4	Ernest Sterckx (BEL)	Alcyon–Dunlop	s.t.
5	Raymond Impanis (BEL)	Alcyon–Dunlop	s.t.
6	André Declerck (BEL)	Bertin–Wolber	s.t.
7	Louis Caput (FRA)	Olympia–Dunlop	s.t.
8	Lode Anthonis (BEL)	Erka	s.t.
9	Maurice Diot (FRA)	Mercier–Hutchinson	s.t.
10	Martin van den Broeck (BEL)	Starnord–Wolber	s.t.
