= Omloop Het Nieuwsblad =

Recurring sporting event

Race details
- Date: Late February
- Region: Flanders, Belgium
- Local name: Omloop Het Nieuwsblad (Dutch)
- Nickname(s): The Omloop; The Opening Classic
- Discipline: Road
- Competition: UCI World Tour; UCI Women's World Tour
- Type: One-day
- Organiser: Flanders Classics
- Race director: Wim Van Herreweghe
- Web site: www.omloophetnieuwsblad.be/en

Men's history
- First edition: 1945
- Editions: 81 (as of 2026)
- First winner: Jean Bogaerts (BEL)
- Most wins: Joseph Bruyère (BEL); Ernest Sterckx (BEL); Peter Van Petegem (BEL) (3 wins each)
- Most recent: Mathieu van der Poel (NED)

Women's history
- First edition: 2006
- Editions: 21 (as of 2026)
- First winner: Suzanne de Goede (NED)
- Most wins: Suzanne de Goede (NED); Emma Johansson (SWE); Anna van der Breggen (NED); Annemiek van Vleuten (NED) (2 wins each)
- Most recent: Demi Vollering (NED)

Omloop Het Nieuwsblad, previously Omloop Het Volk, is a one-day road cycling race in Belgium, held annually in late February. It is the opening event of the Belgian cycling season, as well as the first race of the year in Northwestern Europe, and holds significant prestige because of it. Since 2017, the race has been part of the UCI World Tour, cycling's top-tier professional events.

The race starts in Ghent, Flanders, and finishes in Ninove, Flanders. The race route covers the hills in the Flemish Ardennes, marking the start of the cobbled classics season in Europe. Due to its early calendar date, it is characterized by often cold weather, coming as a contrast to the early-season stage races in the Middle East and Southern Europe. The day after the Omloop, Kuurne–Brussels–Kuurne completes the opening weekend. The race is named after the newspaper sponsoring the event – Het Volk from 1947 to 2009, and Het Nieuwsblad from 2009 to present.

Since 1950, Omloop Het Nieuwsblad U23, a race for under-23 men, has been held on the same day as the men's race.

Since 2006, a women's edition of Omloop Het Nieuwsblad is held on the same day as the men's race, also starting in Ghent and finishing in Ninove, approximately 130 kilometres in distance. Both events are organized by Flanders Classics. Since 2023, the race is part of the UCI Women's World Tour.

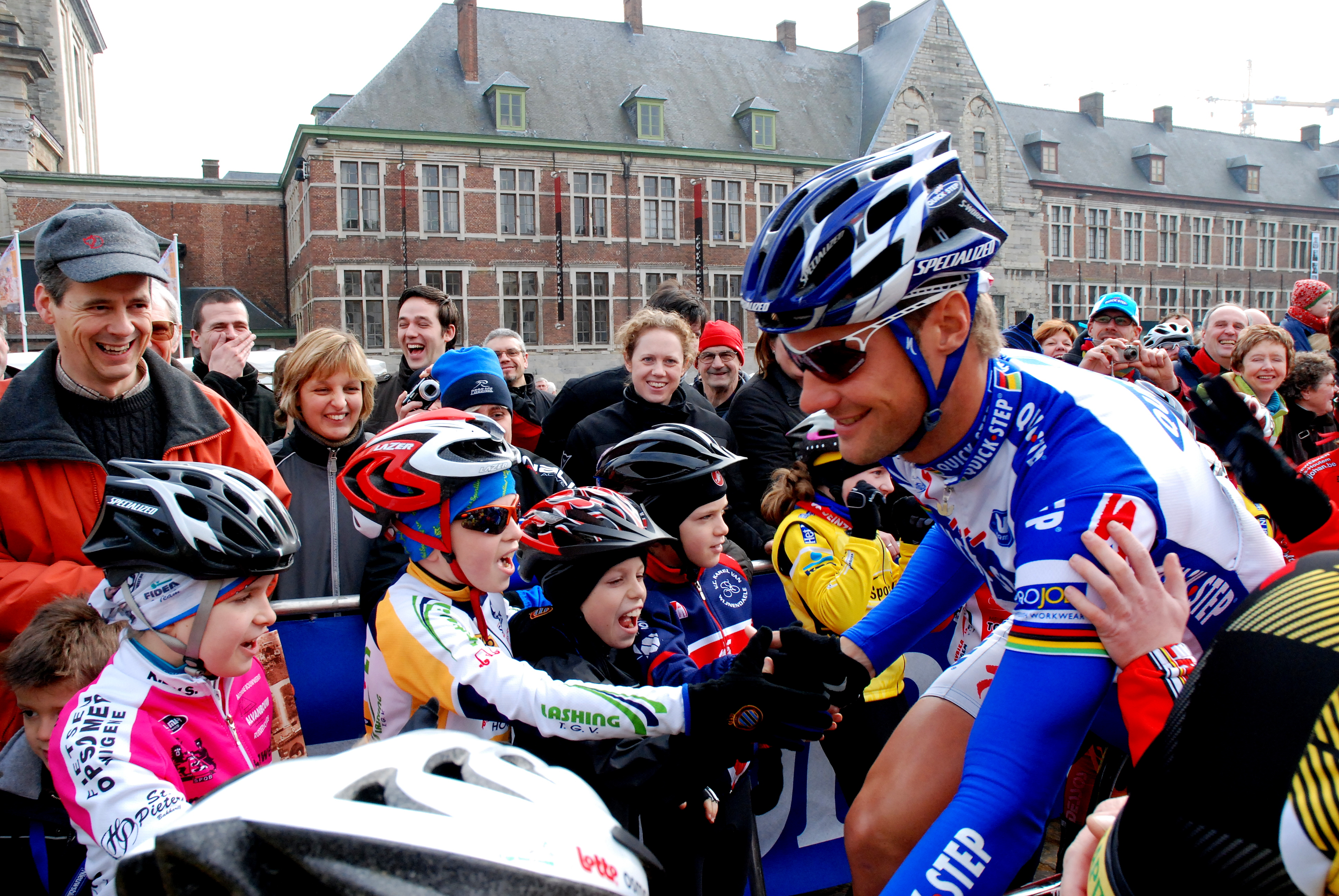
Tom Boonen at the start of the 2009 event

== History ==
=== Omloop Het Volk ===
First held in 1945, the race was called Omloop van Vlaanderen ("Circuit of Flanders"). The event was initiated by Flemish newspaper Het Volk, in response to rivaling newspaper Het Nieuwsblad's classic, the Tour of Flanders. Het Volk, of left-leaning publication, wanted to start a new cycling event in Flanders as a rival race to what it saw as the Tour of Flanders' closeness to the Nazis during World War II. (Note: The Tour of Flanders is the only cycling classic in Europe that was organized on German-occupied territory during the Second World War and in full agreement with the German command. The Germans not only allowed and enjoyed the race but helped police the route as well. This led to accusations of collaboration with Nazi Germany.) The Ronde's organizers protested that the name was too close to their own – there is little semantic difference between "Ronde" and "Omloop". The Belgian cycling federation demanded Het Volk to change the name of the event, prompting Het Volk to serve as title sponsor of their own race.

In 2009 the former rival newspapers Het Volk and Het Nieuwsblad merged, causing the event to be renamed Omloop Het Nieuwsblad for its 64th edition. (Note: Het Nieuwsblad, as the bigger newspaper, became the name-bearer of the merge.) Since 2010, the race has been organised by Flanders Classics. Until 2016, Omloop Het Nieuwsblad was ranked as a 1.HC event of the UCI Europe Tour; since 2017, it is included in the UCI World Tour.

=== Winter race ===
Due to its early-season calendar date, the race has occasionally been affected by cold and wintry conditions, with three editions of the event having been cancelled. The 1971 race was postponed due to snow and run three weeks later. In 1986 and 2004 organizers were forced to cancel the race, as snow and freezing temperatures had made the route too dangerous and riders' safety could not be guaranteed. In modern times, organizers rely heavily on weather forecasts and adjust the course if some sectors are deemed unsafe. Unrelated to the weather, the 1960 race was cancelled following a disagreement between the organizers and cycling's ruling body UCI. (Note: UCI had given better calendar dates to other Belgian races, prompting Het Volk to call off the race in protest.)

=== Belgian opening race ===
Traditionally the opening event of the Belgian cycling season, the race holds particular importance for Belgian cyclists. Throughout its history, Belgian riders, comfortable with cold weather and aided by large, supportive crowds, have dominated the race. Belgians have won 56 editions, although, exemplary for the growing international status of the race, they have only won four of the last ten editions. In 1948 Italian cycling icon Fausto Coppi won the race, but was disqualified for receiving an illegal wheel-change. (Note: Belgian Walschott had given Coppi his wheel, but rules allowed assistance only from team-mates)

The record for wins is three, shared by Joseph Bruyère, Ernest Sterckx and Peter van Petegem. Bruyère holds the fastest average (43.35 km/h) for his 1975 win. Other notable winners include Eddy Merckx, Roger De Vlaeminck, Freddy Maertens, Johan Museeuw, Philippe Gilbert and Thor Hushovd.

== Route ==
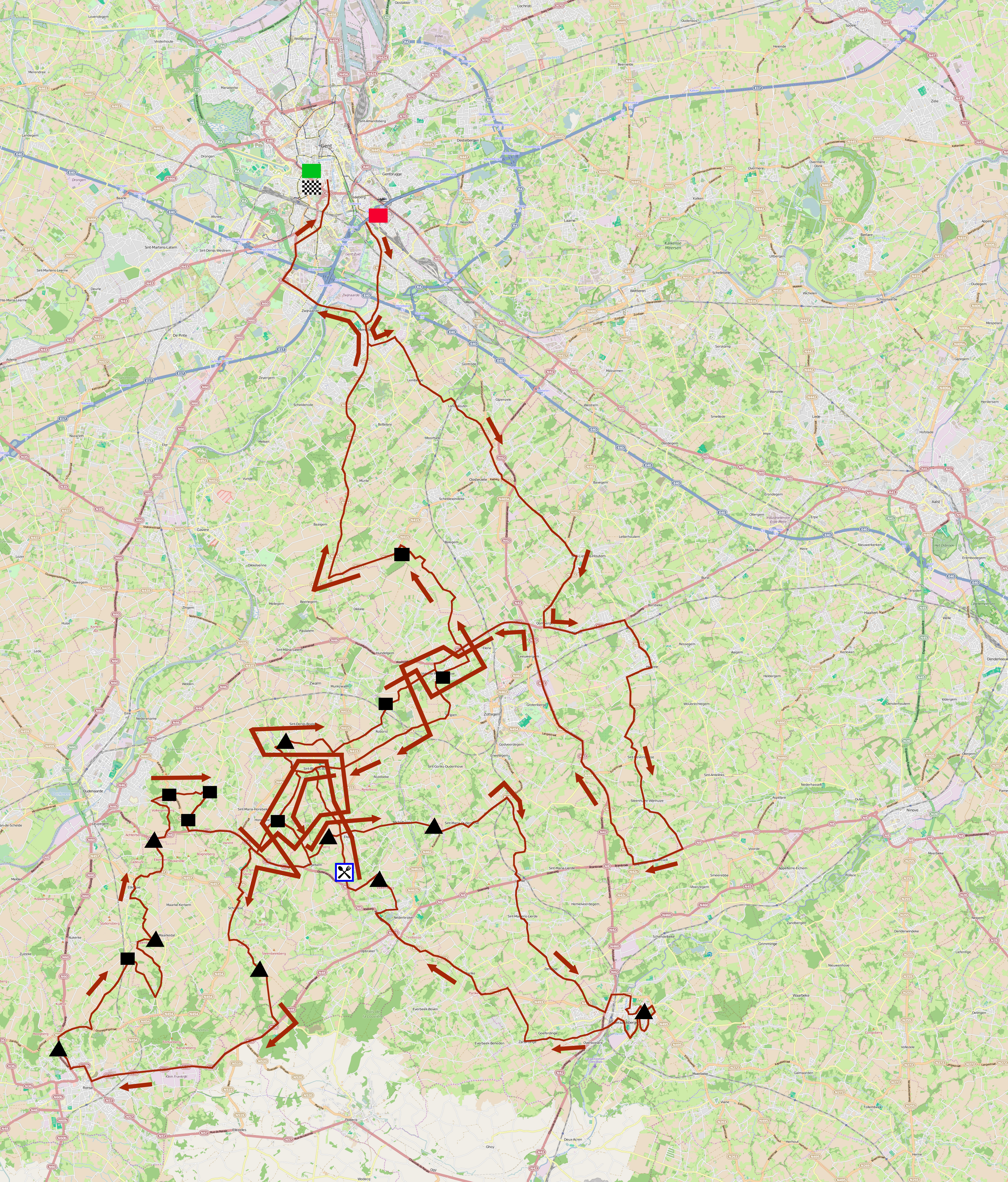
Route of the 2015 edition

Omloop Het Nieuwsblad starts in Ghent, East Flanders, and addresses the Flemish Ardennes in the south of the province, featuring numerous short climbs. The race traditionally finished in Ghent, but different finish locations in the region have been used since the 1990s. From 1996 until 2007 the finish was in Lokeren, 20 km east of Ghent. Since 2018, the race has finished in Ninove, a city around 40 km southeast of Ghent. This will remain the case until at least 2028.

At 200 kilometres and with 13 climbs in the hill zone, the course is challenging and arduous. Additionally, there are several flat stretches of cobbles. Despite annual changes, some of the regular climbs in the Omloop are the Leberg, Berendries, Taaienberg, Muur van Geraardsbergen, Eikenberg and Molenberg. Due to its hilly course in the Flemish Ardennes, the race is similar in nature to the Tour of Flanders, and is often used in preparation for the bigger event five weeks later. The 2016 race featured one new climb, Boembekeberg, as a replacement for the Molenberg, which was skipped because of road works. This was reversed for the 2017 race.

Both the official start and finish were traditionally on Ghent's largest square, Sint-Pietersplein. Every seven years however, when Easter comes early in the year, the square is booked for the annual Mid-Lent fair and organizers need to find different locations. In 2016 and 2017, the Citadel city park, next to the Kuipke velodrome, served as start location. The finish was on the Emile Clauslaan thoroughfare, near the starting place. The finish in Ninove is on the Elisabethlaan, which gradually slopes uphill.

== Men's winners ==
The following riders have won the race:

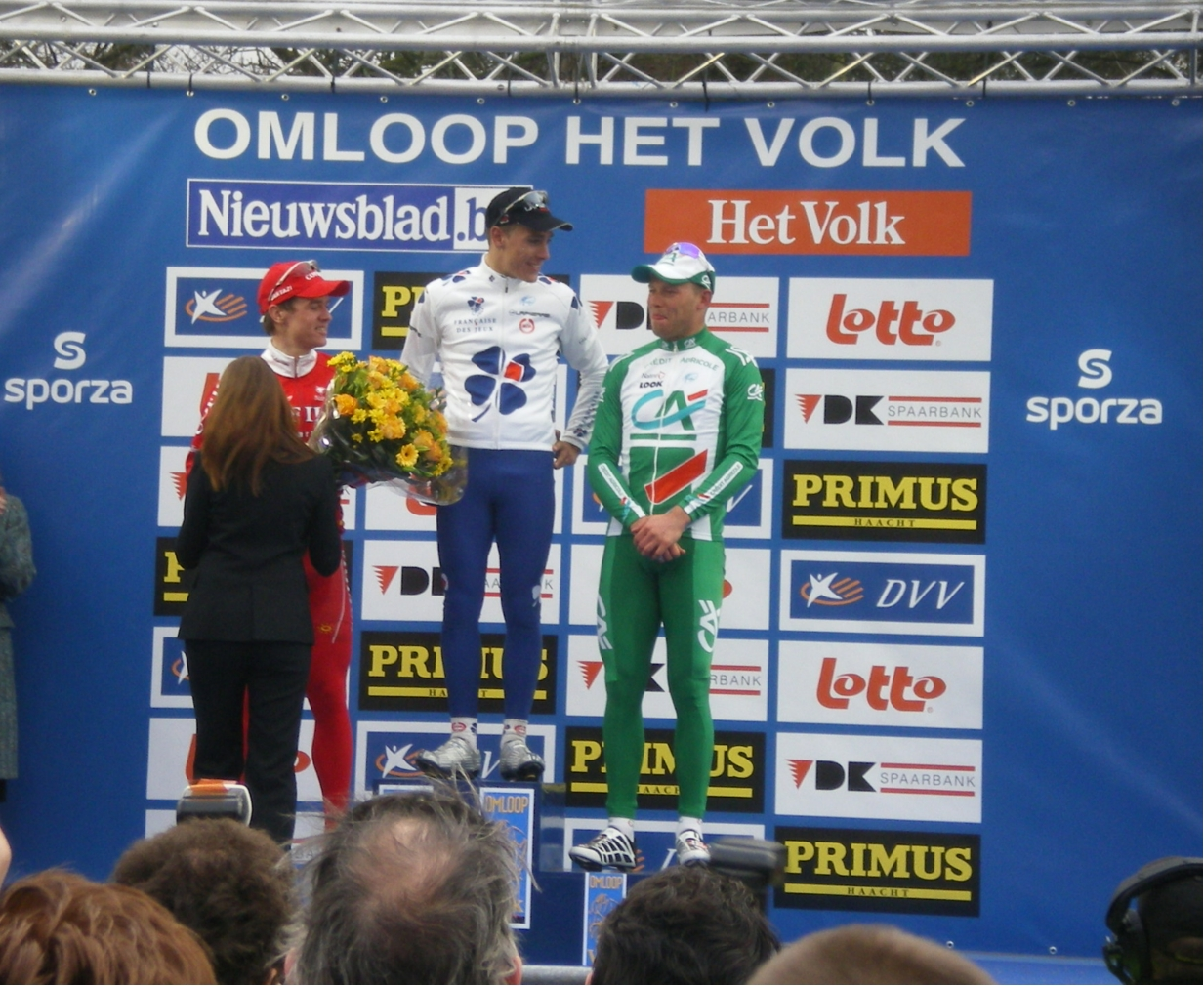
Podium of the 2008 Omloop Het Volk: Nick Nuyens, Philippe Gilbert and Thor Hushovd.

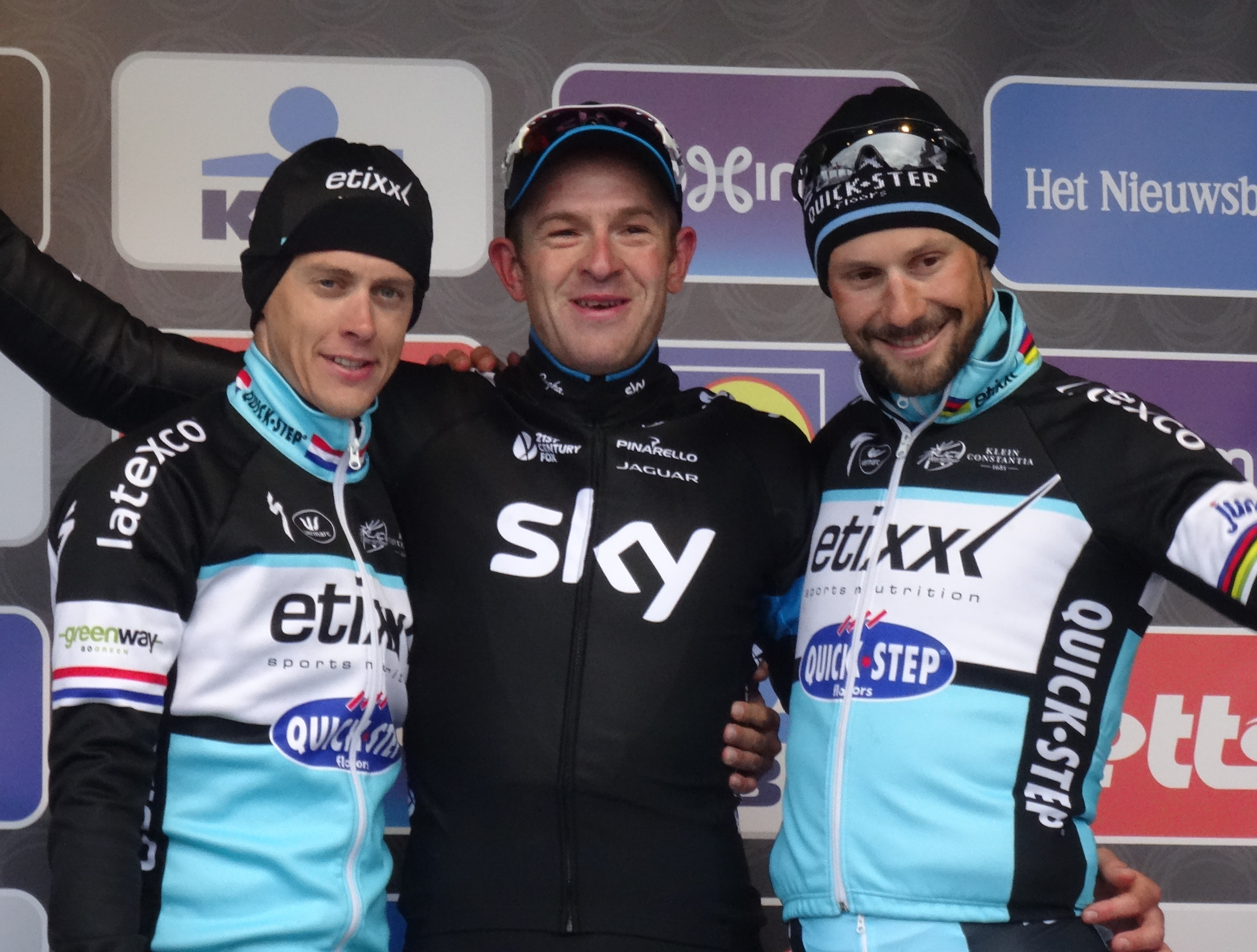
Podium of the 2015 event: Niki Terpstra, winner Ian Stannard and Tom Boonen.

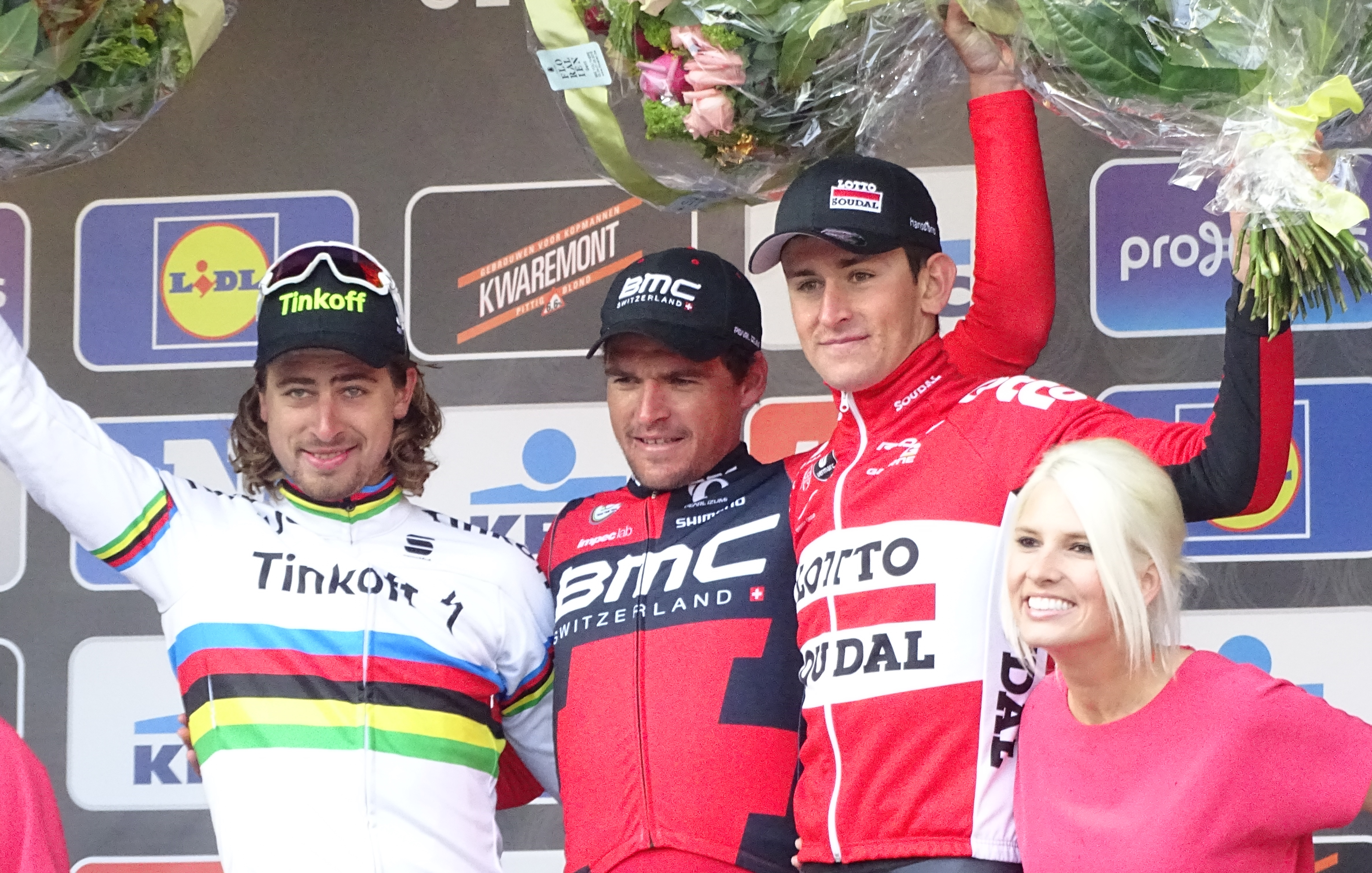
2016 podium: Peter Sagan, Greg Van Avermaet and Tiesj Benoot.

Year	Country	Rider	Team
↓ "Omloop van Vlaanderen" ↓
1945	Belgium	Jean Bogaerts	Alcyon–Dunlop
1946	Belgium	André Pieters	Alcyon–Dunlop
↓ "Omloop Het Volk" ↓
1947	Belgium	Albert Sercu	Bertin–Wolber
1948	Belgium	Sylvain Grysolle	Zircon
1949	Belgium	André Declerck	Bertin–Wolber
1950	Belgium	André Declerck	Bertin–Wolber
1951	Belgium	Jean Bogaerts	Starnord–Wolber
1952	Belgium	Ernest Sterckx	L'Avenir
1953	Belgium	Ernest Sterckx	L'Avenir
1954	Belgium	Karel De Baere	Mercier–BP–Hutchinson
1955	Belgium	Lode Anthonis	L'Avenir
1956	Belgium	Ernest Sterckx	L'Avenir
1957	Belgium	Norbert Kerckhove	Faema–Guerra
1958	Belgium	Joseph Planckaert	Carpano
1959	Ireland	Seamus Elliott	Helyett–Fynsec
1960	No race due to disagreement between organisation and UCI		
1961	Belgium	Arthur De Cabooter	Groene Leeuw–Sinalco–SAS
1962	Belgium	Robert De Middeleir	Wiel's–Groene Leeuw
1963	Belgium	René Van Meenen	Wiel's–Groene Leeuw
1964	Belgium	Frans Melckenbeek	Mercier–BP–Hutchinson
1965	Belgium	Noël De Pauw	Solo–Superia
1966	Netherlands	Jo de Roo	Televizier–Batavus
1967	Belgium	Willy Vekemans	Goldor–Gerka
1968	Belgium	Herman Van Springel	Mann–Grundig
1969	Belgium	Roger De Vlaeminck	Flandria–De Clerck–Krüger
1970	Belgium	Frans Verbeeck	Geens–Watney
1971	Belgium	Eddy Merckx	Molteni
1972	Belgium	Frans Verbeeck	Watney–Avia
1973	Belgium	Eddy Merckx	Molteni
1974	Belgium	Joseph Bruyère	Molteni
1975	Belgium	Joseph Bruyère	Molteni-RYC
1976	Belgium	Willem Peeters	IJsboerke–Colnago
1977	Belgium	Freddy Maertens	Flandria–Velda–Latina Assicurazioni
1978	Belgium	Freddy Maertens	Flandria–Velda–Lano
1979	Belgium	Roger De Vlaeminck	Gis Gelati
1980	Belgium	Joseph Bruyère	Marc-Carlos-V.R.D.
1981	Netherlands	Jan Raas	TI–Raleigh–Creda
1982	Belgium	Alfons De Wolf	Vermeer Thijs
1983	Belgium	Alfons De Wolf	Bianchi–Piaggio
1984	Belgium	Eddy Planckaert	Panasonic
1985	Belgium	Eddy Planckaert	Panasonic
1986	No race due to snow		
1987	Netherlands	Teun van Vliet	Panasonic
1988	Belgium	Ronny Van Holen	Roland
1989	Belgium	Etienne De Wilde	Histor–Sigma
1990	Belgium	Johan Capiot	TVM
1991	Germany	Andreas Kappes	Toshiba–Look
1992	Belgium	Johan Capiot	TVM–Sanyo
1993	Belgium	Wilfried Nelissen	Novemail–Histor–Laser Computer
1994	Belgium	Wilfried Nelissen	Novemail–Histor–Laser Computer
1995	Italy	Franco Ballerini	Mapei–GB–Latexco
1996	Belgium	Tom Steels	Mapei–GB
1997	Belgium	Peter Van Petegem	TVM–Farm Frites
1998	Belgium	Peter Van Petegem	TVM–Farm Frites
1999	Belgium	Frank Vandenbroucke	Cofidis
2000	Belgium	Johan Museeuw	Mapei–Quick-Step
2001	Italy	Michele Bartoli	Mapei–Quick-Step
2002	Belgium	Peter Van Petegem	Lotto–Adecco
2003	Belgium	Johan Museeuw	Quick-Step–Davitamon
2004	No race due to snow		
2005	Belgium	Nick Nuyens	Quick-Step–Innergetic
2006	Belgium	Philippe Gilbert	Française des Jeux
2007	Italy	Filippo Pozzato	Liquigas
2008	Belgium	Philippe Gilbert	Française des Jeux
↓ "Omloop Het Nieuwsblad" ↓
2009	Norway	Thor Hushovd	Cervélo TestTeam
2010	Spain	Juan Antonio Flecha	Team Sky
2011	Netherlands	Sebastian Langeveld	Rabobank
2012	Belgium	Sep Vanmarcke	Garmin–Barracuda
2013	Italy	Luca Paolini	Team Katusha
2014	Great Britain	Ian Stannard	Team Sky
2015	Great Britain	Ian Stannard	Team Sky
2016	Belgium	Greg Van Avermaet	BMC Racing Team
2017	Belgium	Greg Van Avermaet	BMC Racing Team
2018	Denmark	Michael Valgren	Astana
2019	Czech Republic	Zdeněk Štybar	Deceuninck–Quick-Step
2020	Belgium	Jasper Stuyven	Trek–Segafredo
2021	Italy	Davide Ballerini	Deceuninck–Quick-Step
2022	Belgium	Wout van Aert	Team Jumbo–Visma
2023	Netherlands	Dylan van Baarle	Team Jumbo–Visma
2024	Slovenia	Jan Tratnik	Visma–Lease a Bike
2025	Norway	Søren Wærenskjold	Uno-X Mobility
2026	Netherlands	Mathieu van der Poel	Alpecin–Premier Tech

=== Multiple winners ===
Riders in italics are active

Wins	Rider	Editions
3	Ernest Sterckx (BEL)	1952, 1953, 1956
3	Joseph Bruyère (BEL)	1974, 1975, 1980
3	Peter Van Petegem (BEL)	1997, 1998, 2002
2	Jean Bogaerts (BEL)	1945, 1951
2	André Declerck (BEL)	1949, 1950
2	Frans Verbeeck (BEL)	1970, 1972
2	Eddy Merckx (BEL)	1971, 1973
2	Freddy Maertens (BEL)	1977, 1978
2	Roger De Vlaeminck (BEL)	1969, 1979
2	Fons De Wolf (BEL)	1982, 1983
2	Eddy Planckaert (BEL)	1984, 1985
2	Johan Capiot (BEL)	1990, 1992
2	Wilfried Nelissen (BEL)	1993, 1994
2	Johan Museeuw (BEL)	2000, 2003
2	Philippe Gilbert (BEL)	2006, 2008
2	Ian Stannard (GBR)	2014, 2015
2	Greg Van Avermaet (BEL)	2016, 2017

=== Wins per country ===
Wins	Country
58	Belgium
6	Netherlands
5	Italy
2	Great Britain
2	Norway
1	Czech Republic
1	Denmark
1	Germany
1	Ireland
1	Slovenia
1	Spain

== Women ==
Since 2006, there has been a women's version of the Omloop Het Nieuwsblad. Held on the same day as the men's event, it uses much of the same roads and equally opens the women's cycling season in Northern Europe. Recent editions of the race have been around 125 kilometres (78 mi) to 135 kilometres (84 mi) in length, featuring eight climbs and six sections of cobbles. In 2021, the race became part of the UCI Women's ProSeries, before being promoted to the UCI Women's WorldTour in 2023.

As of 2024, Dutch riders Suzanne de Goede, Anna van der Breggen and Annemiek van Vleuten and Sweden's Emma Johansson have won the race twice.

Year	Country	Rider	Team
↓ "Omloop Het Volk" ↓
2006	Netherlands	Suzanne de Goede	AA-Drink Cycling Team
2007	Denmark	Mie Lacota	Team Flexpoint
2008	Netherlands	Kirsten Wild	AA-Drink Cycling Team
↓ "Omloop Het Nieuwsblad" ↓
2009	Netherlands	Suzanne de Goede	Equipe Nürnberger Versicherung
2010	Sweden	Emma Johansson	Red Sun Cycling Team
2011	Sweden	Emma Johansson	Hitec Products UCK
2012	Netherlands	Loes Gunnewijk	Orica–AIS
2013	Australia	Tiffany Cromwell	Orica–AIS
2014	Netherlands	Amy Pieters	Giant–Shimano
2015	Netherlands	Anna van der Breggen	Rabobank-Liv Woman Cycling Team
2016	Great Britain	Lizzie Armitstead	Boels–Dolmans
2017	Netherlands	Lucinda Brand	Team Sunweb
2018	Denmark	Christina Siggaard	Team Virtu Cycling
2019	Netherlands	Chantal Blaak	Boels–Dolmans
2020	Netherlands	Annemiek van Vleuten	Mitchelton–Scott
2021	Netherlands	Anna van der Breggen	SD Worx
2022	Netherlands	Annemiek van Vleuten	Movistar Team
2023	Belgium	Lotte Kopecky	SD Worx
2024	Netherlands	Marianne Vos	Visma–Lease a Bike
2025	Belgium	Lotte Claes	Arkéa–B&B Hotels Women
2026	Netherlands	Demi Vollering	FDJ United–Suez

=== Multiple winners ===
Wins	Rider	Editions
2	Suzanne de Goede (NED)	2006, 2009
2	Emma Johansson (SWE)	2010, 2011
2	Anna van der Breggen (NED)	2015, 2021
2	Annemiek van Vleuten (NED)	2020, 2022

=== Wins per country ===
Wins	Country
13	Netherlands
2	Belgium
2	Denmark
2	Sweden
1	Australia
1	Great Britain

== Omloop Het Nieuwsblad U23 ==
An edition of the race for under-23 men has been held since 1950.

== References and footnotes ==
- European Cycling – The 20 Greatest Races by Noel Henderson (1989) ISBN 0-941950-20-4.
