= Kuurne–Brussels–Kuurne =

Belgian one-day road cycling race

Race details
- Date: Late February – Early March
- Region: Flanders, Belgium
- English name: Kuurne–Brussels–Kuurne
- Local name: Kuurne–Brussel–Kuurne (in Dutch)
- Nickname: KBK
- Discipline: Road
- Competition: UCI ProSeries
- Type: One-day race
- Organiser: Sportingclub Kuurne
- Race director: Peter Debaveye
- Web site: www.kuurne-brussel-kuurne.be

History
- First edition: 1945
- Editions: 78 (as of 2026)
- First winner: Henri Delmuyle (BEL)
- Most wins: Tom Boonen (BEL) (3 wins)
- Most recent: Matthew Brennan (GBR)

Kuurne–Brussels–Kuurne is an annual single-day road cycling race in Belgium. It is held one day after Omloop Het Nieuwsblad, on the last Sunday of February or the first of March, and completes the opening weekend of the Belgian cycling season. It was ranked a 1.HC event of the UCI Europe Tour before joining the UCI ProSeries in 2020. Tom Boonen holds the most wins with three victories.

== History ==
=== Early editions ===
First held in 1946, the race was run from Kuurne, a small town known for its textile industry, to the Belgian capital of Brussels and back. In the 1950s it served as the opening race of the Belgian cycling season. When Brussels was becoming inaccessible for a cycling event in the late 1960s, the race was rerouted towards the Flemish Ardennes and renamed "Omloop der beide Vlaanderen" ("Circuit of both Flanders"). (Note: The race has not been in Brussels since 1968. Since then it is run in the provinces of West Flanders and East Flanders, the two westernmost provinces of Belgium.) In 1979 organizers decided to rename the event to Kuurne–Brussels–Kuurne nonetheless.

=== Opening weekend ===
For many decades, Kuurne–Brussels–Kuurne has served as the second race of the opening weekend in Belgium, after Omloop Het Nieuwsblad on Saturday, as well as the first weekend of racing in Northwestern Europe. Although second after the Omloop, and considered the smaller of the two events, it holds significant prestige because of its calendar date. Since 2005 it is included in the UCI Europe Tour; in 2016 it was upgraded to a 1.HC event, the same ranking as Omloop Het Nieuwsblad, but Omloop was upgraded to UCI World Tour level in 2017. Despite tandeming with Omloop Het Nieuwsblad, no rider has ever won the Omloop and Kuurne–Brussels–Kuurne on the same weekend.

=== Winter race ===
As it is run in late winter, Kuurne–Brussels–Kuurne has often been affected by poor weather. The race had to be cancelled three times because of snow or frost – in 1986, 1993 and 2013. The 2010 event was run in extreme weather as the remnants of cyclone Xynthia hit Belgium, with strong winds and torrential rain ravaging the peloton. The race had to be shortened by 20 km because a fallen tree obstructed the road. The edition was won by Dutch outsider Bobbie Traksel; only 26 of 195 riders finished the race. In 2004 Kuurne served as the opening race of the season, after Omloop Het Nieuwsblad was cancelled because of snow, before thaw set in on the night before the Sunday race.

== Route ==
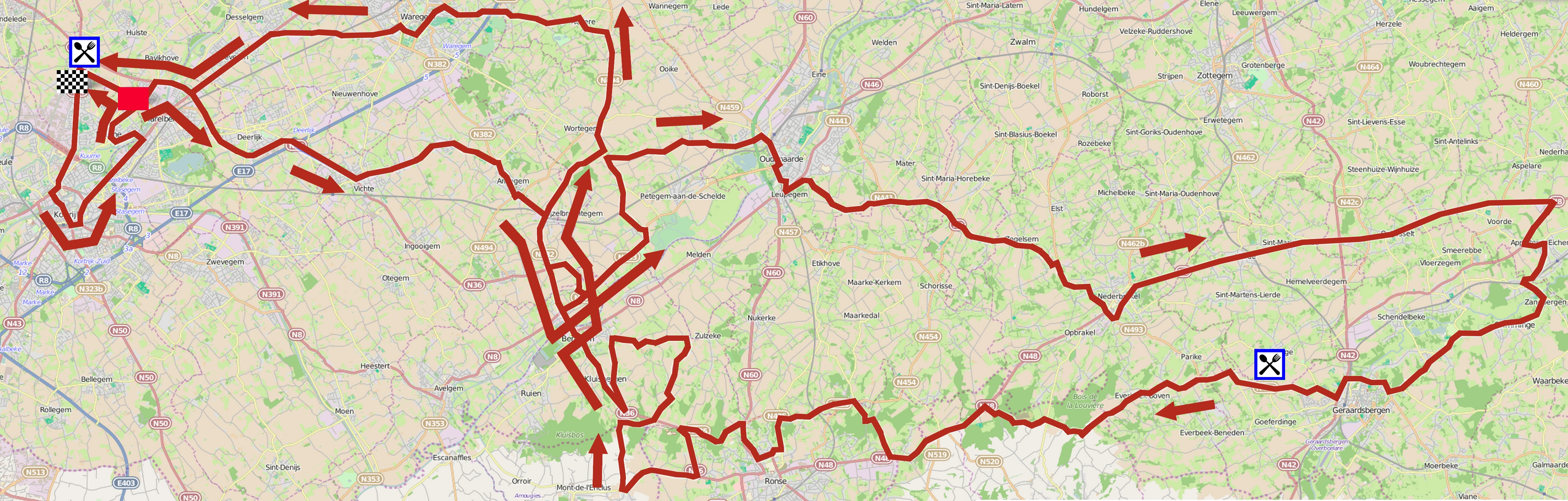
Route of the 2015 edition

Despite its name, the route does not actually extend to Brussels. The race starts on the hippodrome of Kuurne, in the south of West Flanders, before heading east in the direction of Brussels, but its easternmost point is somewhere near Ninove, 23 km west of Brussels. After the turning point, the race addresses the Flemish Ardennes where a number of hills feature, before finishing in Kuurne after approximately 200 km. The route in the hill zone changes every year, but some of the regular climbs include Edelareberg, La Houppe, Kanarieberg, Kruisberg, Oude Kwaremont, Tiegemberg and Nokereberg.

With a long and flat run-in to the finish, the course is less selective than the Omloop Het Nieuwsblad. The race ends with two local laps around Kortrijk and Kuurne. With the last climb of the race coming at 53 km from the finish, Kuurne–Brussels–Kuurne has established itself as something of a sprinters’ classic.

== List of winners ==
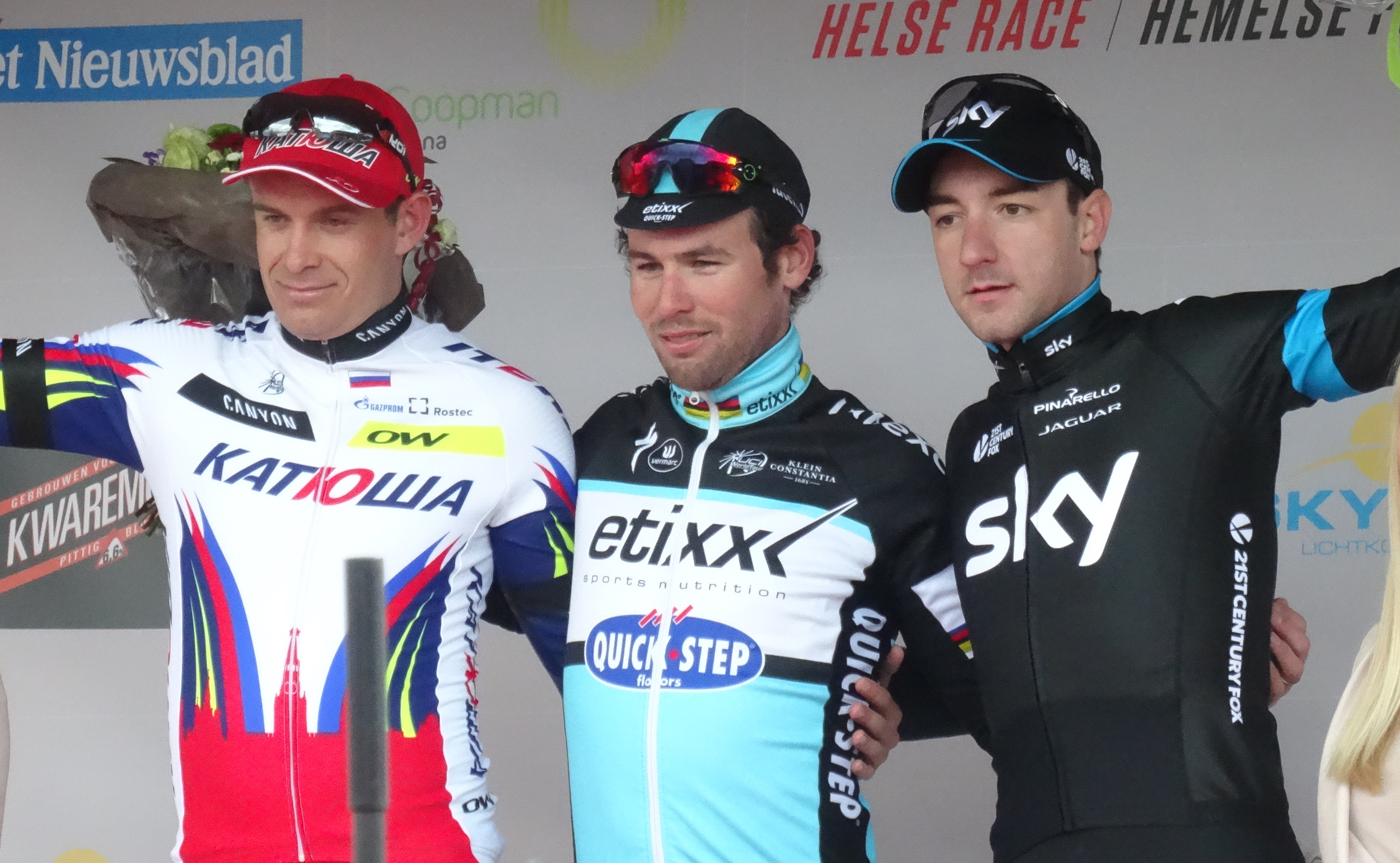
Podium of the 2015 race: Alexander Kristoff, Mark Cavendish and Elia Viviani

Year	Country	Rider	Team
↓ "Omloop van Kuurne" ↓
1945	Belgium	Valère Ollivier	individual
↓ "Brussel–Kuurne" ↓
1946	Belgium	Henri Delmuylle	individual
↓ "Kuurne–Brussel–Kuurne" ↓
1947	Belgium	André Pieters	Celta–Erka
1948	Belgium	Achiel Buysse	Thompson
1949	Belgium	Albert Decin	La Française–Dunlop
1950	Belgium	Valère Ollivier	Bertin–Wolber
1951	Belgium	André Declerck	Bertin–Wolber
1952	Belgium	André Maelbrancke	Devos Sport
1953	Belgium	Leopold De Graeveleyn	Mercier–Hutchinson
1954	Belgium	Leon Vandaele	Bertin–d'Alessandro
1955	Belgium	Joseph Planckaert	Elvé–Peugeot
1956	Belgium	Henri Denijs	Bertin–Huret
1957	Belgium	Joseph Verhelts	Faema–Guerra
1958	Belgium	Gilbert Desmet	Faema–Guerra
1959	Belgium	Gentiel Saelens	Flandria–Dr. Mann
1960	Belgium	Joseph Planckaert	Wiel's–Flandria
1961	Belgium	Alfred De Bruyne (victory shared with Leon Vandaele)	Baratti–Milano
1961	Belgium	Leon Vandaele (victory shared with Alfred De Bruyne)	Wiel's–Flandria
1962	Netherlands	Piet Rentmeester	Gitane–Leroux
1963	Belgium	Noël Foré	Faema–Flandria
1964	Belgium	Arthur Decabooter	Solo–Superia
1965	Belgium	Guido Reybrouck	Flandria–Romeo
1966	Belgium	Gustaaf De Smet	Wiel's–Groene Leeuw
1967	Belgium	Daniel Van Rijckeghem	Mann–Grundig
↓ "Omloop der Beide Vlaanderen" ↓
1968	Belgium	Eric Leman	Flandria–De Clerck
1969	Belgium	Freddy Decloedt	Pull Over Centrale–Tasmania
1970	Belgium	Roger De Vlaeminck	Flandria–Mars
1971	Belgium	Roger De Vlaeminck	Flandria–Mars
1972	Belgium	Gustaaf Van Roosbroeck	Watneys–Avia
1973	Belgium	Walter Planckaert	Watney–Maes
1974	Belgium	Wilfried Wesemael	MIC–Ludo–De Gribaldy
1975	Belgium	Frans Verhaegen	IJsboerke–Colner
1976	Belgium	Frans Verhaegen	Flandria–Velda–West Vlaams Vleesbedrijf
1977	Belgium	Patrick Sercu	Fiat France
1978	Belgium	Patrick Lefevere	Marc Zeepcentrale–Superia
↓ "Kuurne–Brussel–Kuurne" ↓
1979	Belgium	Walter Planckaert	Mini Flat–V.D.B.
1980	Netherlands	Jan Raas	TI–Raleigh
1981	Belgium	Jos Jacobs	Capri Sonne
1982	West Germany	Gregor Braun	Capri Sonne
1983	Netherlands	Jan Raas	TI–Raleigh
1984	Netherlands	Jos Lammertink	Panasonic
1985	Belgium	William Tackaert	Fangio–Ecoturbo
1986	No race		
1987	Belgium	Ludo Peeters	Superconfex–Yoko
1988	Belgium	Hendrik Redant	Isoglass–Robland
1989	Belgium	Edwig Van Hooydonck	Superconfex–Yoko
1990	Belgium	Hendrik Redant	Lotto-Super Club
1991	Belgium	Johnny Dauwe	Tulip Computers
1992	Germany	Olaf Ludwig	Panasonic–Sportlife
1993	No race		
1994	Belgium	Johan Museeuw	GB–MG Maglificio
1995	France	Frédéric Moncassin	Novell
1996	Denmark	Rolf Sørensen	Rabobank
1997	Belgium	Johan Museeuw	Mapei–GB
1998	Belgium	Andrei Tchmil	Lotto–Mobistar
1999	Belgium	Jo Planckaert	Lotto–Mobistar
2000	Belgium	Andrei Tchmil	Lotto–Adecco
2001	Belgium	Peter Van Petegem	Mercury–Viatel
2002	Estonia	Jaan Kirsipuu	AG2R Prévoyance
2003	Netherlands	Roy Sentjens	Rabobank
2004	Netherlands	Steven de Jongh	Rabobank
2005	United States	George Hincapie	Discovery Channel
2006	Belgium	Nick Nuyens	Quick-Step–Innergetic
2007	Belgium	Tom Boonen	Quick-Step–Innergetic
2008	Netherlands	Steven de Jongh	Quick-Step
2009	Belgium	Tom Boonen	Quick-Step
2010	Netherlands	Bobbie Traksel	Vacansoleil
2011	Australia	Christopher Sutton	Team Sky
2012	Great Britain	Mark Cavendish	Team Sky
2013	No race due to snow		
2014	Belgium	Tom Boonen	Omega Pharma–Quick-Step
2015	Great Britain	Mark Cavendish	Etixx–Quick-Step
2016	Belgium	Jasper Stuyven	Trek–Segafredo
2017	Slovakia	Peter Sagan	Bora–Hansgrohe
2018	Netherlands	Dylan Groenewegen	LottoNL–Jumbo
2019	Luxembourg	Bob Jungels	Deceuninck–Quick-Step
2020	Denmark	Kasper Asgreen	Deceuninck–Quick-Step
2021	Denmark	Mads Pedersen	Trek–Segafredo
2022	Netherlands	Fabio Jakobsen	Quick-Step Alpha Vinyl Team
2023	Belgium	Tiesj Benoot	Team Jumbo–Visma
2024	Belgium	Wout Van Aert	Visma–Lease a Bike
2025	Belgium	Jasper Philipsen	Alpecin–Deceuninck
2026	Great Britain	Matthew Brennan	Visma–Lease a Bike

=== Wins per country ===
Wins	Country
55	Belgium
10	Netherlands
3	Denmark; Great Britain
2	Germany (including West Germany)
1	Australia; Estonia; France; Luxembourg; Slovakia; United States

== Junior race ==
A junior version of the race has been held since 2000.

=== Winners ===
Year	Winner	Second	Third
Kuurnse Leieomloop
2000	(Belgium) Kevin De Weert	(Belgium) Wim De Vocht	(Belgium) Jurgen Van den Broeck
2001	(Belgium) Sven Vervloet	(Belgium) Giovanni Pommelaere	(Belgium) Joeri Clauwaert
2002	(Netherlands) Jasper van Heeswijk	(Netherlands) Stefan Huizinga	(Belgium) Nick Ingels
2003	(United Kingdom) Geraint Thomas	(France) Jérémy Beyaert	(Belgium) Bart Veyt
2004	(Belgium) Stijn Joseph	(Belgium) Tim Roels	(United Kingdom) Ian Stannard
2005	(Belgium) Frederiek Nolf	(Belgium) Toon Declercq	(Belgium) Jérôme Baugnies
2006	(Belgium) Sven Nooytens	(Belgium) Jan Ghyselinck	(France) Ludovic Vasseur
2007	(United Kingdom) Adam Blythe	(Belgium) Nicolas Vereecken	(Belgium) Kevin Lava
2008	(Netherlands) Barry Markus	(Belgium) Nicolas Vereecken	(Netherlands) Moreno Hofland
2009	(Netherlands) Moreno Hofland	(Netherlands) Rune van der Meijden	(Belgium) Jochen Deweer
2010	(Netherlands) Paul Moerland	(Belgium) Frederik Frison	(Netherlands) Didier Caspers
2011	(Belgium) Joachim Vanreyten	(Netherlands) Dylan Groenewegen	(France) Yannis Yssaad
2012	(Belgium) Niels Vanderaerden	(France) Félix Pouilly	(Netherlands) Piotr Havik
2013	No race		
Kuurne–Brussels–Kuurne Juniors
2014	(United Kingdom) James Shaw	(Belgium) Lionel Taminiaux	(Belgium) Robbe Casier
2015	(Netherlands) Yannick Detant	(France) Mathieu Rigollot	(France) Alan Riou
2016	(United Kingdom) Ethan Hayter	(France) Clément Bétouigt-Suire	(Belgium) Jasper Philipsen
2017	(Denmark) Johan Langballe	(Denmark) Peter Haslund	(France) Rémi Huens
2018	(Belgium) Remco Evenepoel	(Denmark) Jacob Hindsgaul Madsen	(United Kingdom) Charley Calvert
2019	(Netherlands) Casper van Uden	(France) Antonin Corvaisier	(Netherlands) Bodi del Grosso
2020	(Belgium) Cian Uijtdebroeks	(Netherlands) Pepijn Reinderink	(United Kingdom) Jack Rootkin-Gray
2021	No race		
2022	(Belgium) Sente Sentjens	(Netherlands) Vincent van Dorp	(France) Thibaud Gruel
2023	(Belgium) Jarno Widar	(Slovenia) Zak Erzen	(Belgium) Steffen de Schuyteneer
