= 1946 Gent–Wevelgem =

Race details
- Dates: 26 May 1946
- Stages: 1
- Distance: 200 km (120 mi)
- Winning time: 5h 42' 00"

Results
| | Winner | Ernest Sterckx (BEL) |
| | Second | Maurice Desimpelaere (BEL) |
| | Third | Michel Remue (BEL) |

The 1946 Gent–Wevelgem was the eighth edition of the Belgian Gent–Wevelgem cycle race and was held on 26 May 1946. The race started in Ghent and finished in Wevelgem. The race was won by Ernest Sterckx.

== General classification ==
Final general classification

| Rank | Rider | Time |
|---|---|---|
| 1 | Ernest Sterckx (BEL) | 5h 42' 00" |
| 2 | Maurice Desimpelaere (BEL) | + 0" |
| 3 | Michel Remue (BEL) | + 0" |
| 4 | Karel Debaere (BEL) | + 2' 30" |
| 5 | Stan Ockers (BEL) | + 2' 35" |
| 6 | Achiel Buysse (BEL) | + 3' 03" |
| 7 | Maurice Deschacht (BEL) | + 3' 08" |
| 8 | Omer Huwel (BEL) | + 5' 40" |
| 9 | Frans Bonduel (BEL) | + 6' 00" |
| 10 | René Janssens (BEL) | + 8' 00" |
