= 1950 Omloop Het Volk =

Race details
- Dates: 5 March 1950
- Stages: 1
- Distance: 235 km (146 mi)
- Winning time: 6h 12' 30"

Results
	Winner	André Declerck (BEL)
	Second	Maurice Meersman (BEL)
	Third	Briek Schotte (BEL)

The 1950 Omloop Het Volk was the sixth edition of the Omloop Het Volk cycle race and was held on 5 March 1950. The race started and finished in Ghent. The race was won by André Declerck.

== General classification ==
Final general classification
Rank	Rider	Time
1	André Declerck (BEL)	6h 12' 30"
2	Maurice Meersman (BEL)	+ 0"
3	Briek Schotte (BEL)	+ 0"
4	Maurice De Muer (FRA)	+ 0"
5	Joseph Verhaert (BEL)	+ 0"
6	Roger Gyselinck (BEL)	+ 0"
7	Georges Vermeersch (BEL)	+ 0"
8	Rik Evens (BEL)	+ 1' 55"
9	Georges Furniere (BEL)	+ 2' 07"
10	Edward Peeters (BEL)	+ 2' 10"
