= 1954 Gent–Wevelgem =

Race details
- Dates: 28 March 1954
- Stages: 1
- Distance: 235 km (146 mi)
- Winning time: 6h 32' 00"

Results
	Winner	Rolf Graf (SUI)
	Second	Ferdinand Kübler (SUI)
	Third	Ernest Sterckx (BEL)

The 1954 Gent–Wevelgem was the 16th edition of the Belgian Gent–Wevelgem cycle race and was held on 28 March 1954. The race started in Ghent and finished in Wevelgem. The race was won by Rolf Graf of Switzerland. This was the first time the race had not been won by a Belgian competitor.

== General classification ==
Final general classification

Rank	Rider	Time
1	Rolf Graf (SUI)	6h 32' 00"
2	Ferdinand Kübler (SUI)	+ 10"
3	Ernest Sterckx (BEL)	+ 10"
4	Marcel Ryckaert (BEL)	+ 10"
5	Leon Vandaele (BEL)	+ 10"
6	René Mertens (BEL)	+ 10"
7	Germain Derycke (BEL)	+ 10"
8	Marcel Hendrickx (BEL)	+ 10"
9	Maurice Blomme (BEL)	+ 10"
10	André Pieters (BEL)	+ 10"
