= 1945 Omloop van Vlaanderen =

Race details
- Dates: 25 March 1945
- Stages: 1
- Distance: 187 km (116 mi)
- Winning time: 5h 39' 56"

Results
| | Winner | Jean Bogaerts (BEL) |
| | Second | Maurice Desimpelaere (BEL) |
| | Third | Robert Van Eenaeme (BEL) |

The 1945 Omloop van Vlaanderen was the inaugural edition of the Omloop van Vlaanderen cycle race and was held on 25 March 1945. The race started and finished in Ghent. The race was won by Jean Bogaerts.

== General classification ==
Final general classification
| Rank | Rider | Time |
|---|---|---|
| 1 | Jean Bogaerts (BEL) | 5h 39' 56" |
| 2 | Maurice Desimpelaere (BEL) | + 0" |
| 3 | Robert Van Eenaeme (BEL) | + 0" |
| 4 | Joseph Moerenhout (BEL) | + 0" |
| 5 | Frans Sterckx (BEL) | + 0" |
| 6 | Jacques Geus (BEL) | + 0" |
| 7 | Eugeen Jacobs (BEL) | + 0" |
| 8 | Triphon Verstraeten (BEL) | + 0" |
| 9 | Prosper Depredomme (BEL) | + 0" |
| 10 | Désiré Keteleer (BEL) | + 0" |
