= 1941 Tour of Flanders =

Race details
- Dates: May 4, 1941
- Stages: 1
- Distance: 198 km (123.0 mi)
- Winning time: 5h 58' 00"

Results
	Winner	Achiel Buysse (BEL)
	Second	Gustaaf Van Overloop (BEL)
	Third	Odiel Van Den Meersschaut (BEL)

The 25th edition of the Tour of Flanders cycling classic race was held on Sunday, 4 May 1941. Belgian Achiel Buysse won the Monument for a second time in a row. In total, 38 of 112 riders finished.

== Route ==
The race started in Ghent and covered 198 km (128 miles) on the way to the finish in Wetteren.

The course featured 3 categorized climbs:

- Kwaremont
- Kruisberg
- Edelareberg

== Race Report ==
Achiel Buysse won the sprint in front of his six breakaway companions. He completed the race with an average of 34.980 km/h.

== General classification ==
=== Final general classification ===
Rank	Rider	Team	Time
1	Achiel Buysse (BEL)	Dilecta–Wolber	5h 38' 00"
2	Gustaaf Van Overloop (BEL)	Individual	s.t.
3	Odiel Van Den Meersschaut (BEL)	Individual	s.t.
4	Maurice Clautier (BEL)	Alcyon–Dunlop	s.t.
5	Albert Beirnaert (BEL)	Individual	s.t.
6	Eugène Kiewit (BEL)	Individual	s.t.
7	Jules Lowie (BEL)	Mercier–Hutchinson	s.t.
8	Martin Van Den Broeck (BEL)	Individual	1' 45"
9	Joseph Somers (BEL)	Helyett–Hutchinson	3' 15"
10	Achiel De Backer (BEL)	Individual	5' 00"
