= 1963 Omloop Het Volk =

Race details
- Dates: 2 March 1963
- Stages: 1
- Distance: 181 km (112 mi)
- Winning time: 4h 32' 00"

Results
	Winner	René Van Meenen (BEL)
	Second	Ludo Janssens (BEL)
	Third	Jean-Baptiste Claes (BEL)

The 1963 Omloop Het Volk was the 18th edition of the Omloop Het Volk cycle race and was held on 2 March 1963. The race started and finished in Ghent. The race was won by René Van Meenen.

== General classification ==
Final general classification
Rank	Rider	Time
1	René Van Meenen (BEL)	4h 32' 00"
2	Ludo Janssens (BEL)	+ 0"
3	Jean-Baptiste Claes (BEL)	+ 0"
4	Frans Van Immerseel (BEL)	+ 0"
5	Joseph Dewit (BEL)	+ 2' 05"
6	Walter Muylaert (BEL)	+ 2' 05"
7	Daniel Doom (BEL)	+ 2' 05"
8	Rene Thyssen (BEL)	+ 2' 05"
9	Romain van Wynsberghe (BEL)	+ 2' 05"
10	Piet van Est (NED)	+ 2' 05"
