= 1953 Omloop Het Volk =

Race details
- Dates: 8 March 1953
- Stages: 1
- Distance: 220 km (140 mi)
- Winning time: 6h 07' 00"

Results
	Winner	Ernest Sterckx (BEL)
	Second	Maurice Mollin (BEL)
	Third	Marcel Ryckaert (BEL)

The 1953 Omloop Het Volk was the ninth edition of the Omloop Het Volk cycle race and was held on 8 March 1953. The race started and finished in Ghent. The race was won by Ernest Sterckx.

== General classification ==
Final general classification
Rank	Rider	Time
1	Ernest Sterckx (BEL)	6h 07' 00"
2	Maurice Mollin (BEL)	+ 0"
3	Marcel Ryckaert (BEL)	+ 0"
4	Claude Rouer (FRA)	+ 0"
5	Gerard Buyl (BEL)	+ 0"
6	Henri van Kerckhove (BEL)	+ 0"
7	Valentin Petry (FRG)	+ 0"
8	Alfons Van den Brande (BEL)	+ 0"
9	René Mertens (BEL)	+ 0"
10	Edward Peeters (BEL)	+ 0"
