= Ludo Janssens =

Belgian cyclist

Personal information
- Born: 19 April 1942 (age 84) Antwerp, Belgium

Cycling career
- Sport: Cycling
- Current team: Retired
- Discipline: Road
- Role: Rider

Professional teams
- 1961–1962: Solo–Van Steenbergen
- 1963: G.B.C.–Libertas
- 1964–1965: Pelforth–Sauvage–Lejeune

Major wins
- One-day races and Classics Brabantse Pijl (1962) Grand Prix de Denain (1965)

Ludo Janssens (born 19 April 1942 in Antwerp) is a Belgian former road cyclist. Professional from 1961 to 1965, he notably won the 1962 Brabantse Pijl, in addition several other larger one day races. He also competed in the 1963 Tour de France, finishing 39th overall.

== Major results ==
1961
1st Druivenkoers-Overijse
5th Paris–Tours
1962
1st Brabantse Pijl
1st Nationale Sluitingprijs
6th Overall Vuelta Ciclista a la Comunidad Valenciana

1st Stage 4

1963
2nd Omloop Het Volk
1964
2nd Schaal Sels
3rd GP Flandria
5th Grand Prix des Nations
7th GP de Belgique
9th Overall Tour du Nord
1965
1st Grand Prix de Denain
8th Omloop Het Volk
