= 1962 Brabantse Pijl =

Race details
- Dates: 5 April 1962
- Stages: 1
- Distance: 185 km (115.0 mi)
- Winning time: 5h 22' 00"

Results
	Winner	Ludo Janssens (BEL)
	Second	Robert De Middeleir (BEL)
	Third	Raymond Impanis (BEL)

The 1962 Brabantse Pijl was the second edition of the Brabantse Pijl cycle race and was held on 5 April 1962. The race started and finished in Brussels. The race was won by Ludo Janssens.

== General classification ==
Final general classification

Rank	Rider	Time
1	Ludo Janssens (BEL)	5h 22' 00"
2	Robert De Middeleir (BEL)	+ 0"
3	Raymond Impanis (BEL)	+ 3"
4	Emile Daems (BEL)	+ 1' 48"
5	Dieter Puschel (DEU)	+ 4' 20"
6	Hans Junkermann (DEU)	+ 5' 55"
7	Etienne Vercauteren (BEL)	+ 8' 10"
8	José Thumas (BEL)	+ 8' 10"
9	André Bar (BEL)	+ 8' 10"
10	Benoni Beheyt (BEL)	+ 8' 30"
