= 1958 Paris–Roubaix =

Cycling race

Race details
- Dates: 13 April 1958
- Stages: 1
- Distance: 269 km (167.1 mi)
- Winning time: 8h 04' 41"

Results
	Winner	Leon Vandaele (BEL)
	Second	Miguel Poblet (ESP)
	Third	Rik Van Looy (BEL)

The 1958 Paris–Roubaix was the 56th edition of the Paris–Roubaix, a classic one-day cycle race in France. The single day event was held on 13 April 1958 and stretched 269 km (167 mi) from Paris to the finish at Roubaix Velodrome. The winner was Leon Vandaele from Belgium.

== Results ==
Final results (1–10)
Rank	Cyclist	Time
1	Leon Vandaele (BEL)	8h 04' 41″
2	Miguel Poblet (ESP)	+0' 00″
3	Rik Van Looy (BEL)	+0' 00″
4	Rik Van Steenbergen (BEL)	+0' 00″
5	Jean Forestier (FRA)	+0' 00″
6	Alfred De Bruyne (BEL)	+0' 00″
7	Marcel Janssens (BEL)	+0' 00″
8	Roger Hassenforder (FRA)	+0' 00″
9	Raymond Impanis (BEL)	+0' 00″
10	Jan Zagers (BEL)	+0' 00″
