= 1947 La Flèche Wallonne =

Race details
- Dates: 15 June 1947
- Stages: 1
- Distance: 276 km (171.5 mi)
- Winning time: 8h 43' 00"

Results
	Winner	Ernest Sterckx (BEL)
	Second	Maurice Desimpelaere (BEL)
	Third	Gustave Van Overloop (BEL)

The 1947 La Flèche Wallonne was the 11th edition of La Flèche Wallonne cycle race and was held on the 15th of June 1947. The race started in Mons and finished in Liège. The race was won by Ernest Sterckx with a time of eight hours and forty-three minutes.

== General classification ==
Final general classification

Rank	Rider	Time
1	Ernest Sterckx (BEL)	8h 43' 00"
2	Maurice Desimpelaere (BEL)	+ 1' 20"
3	Gustave Van Overloop (BEL)	+ 1' 20"
4	Stan Ockers (BEL)	+ 2' 00"
5	Jean Breuer (BEL)	+ 3' 30"
6	Émile Masson (BEL)	+ 8' 00"
7	Prosper Depredomme (BEL)	+ 8' 00"
8	Jacques Geus (BEL)	+ 8' 00"
9	Guillaume Cappelmans (BEL)	+ 9' 00"
10	Albert Pottgens (BEL)	+ 12' 40"
