= Maurice Meersman =

Belgian cyclist

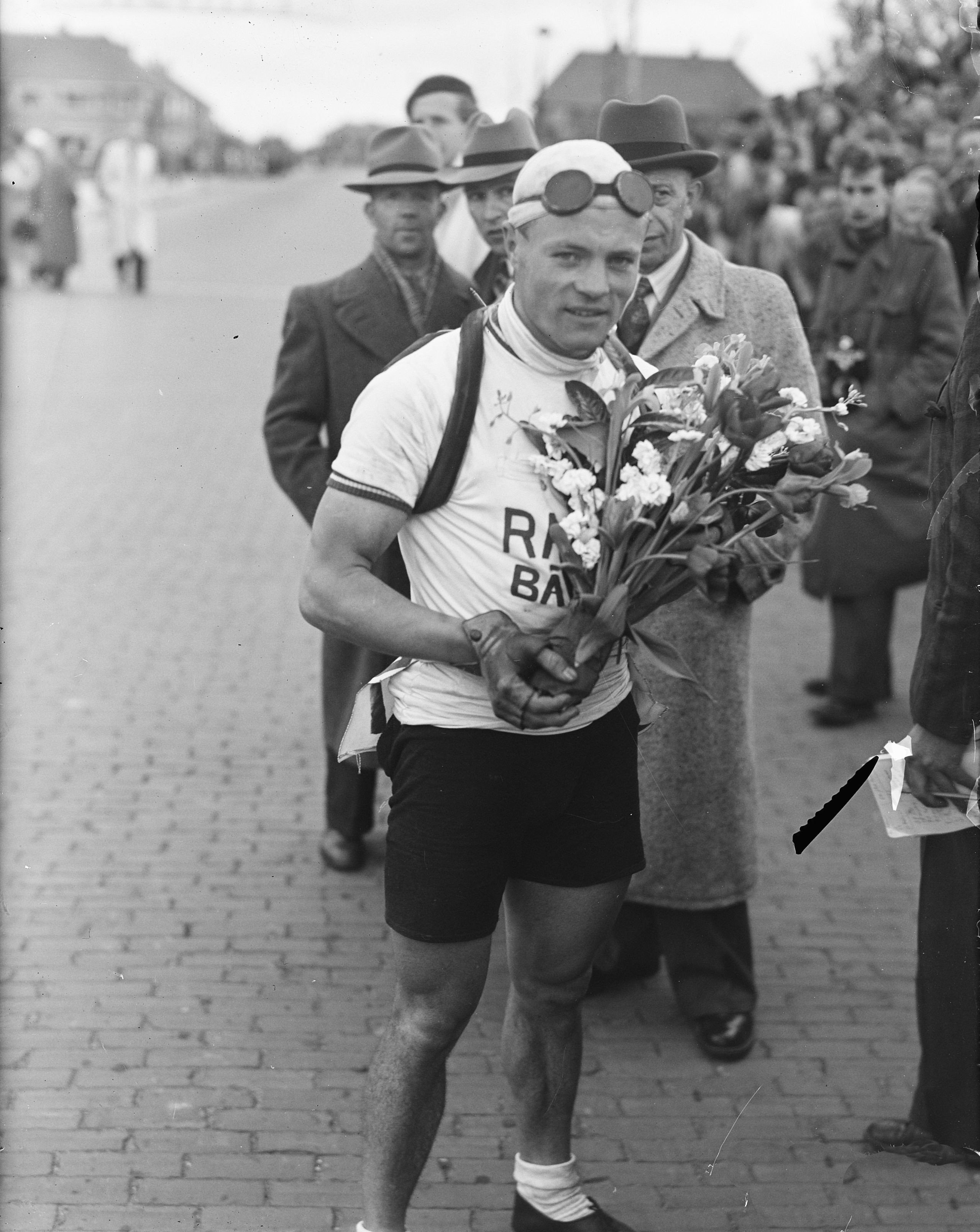
- Meersman (1949)

Personal information
- Born: 17 February 1922 Wakken, Belgium
- Died: 13 December 2008 (aged 86) Tielt, Belgium

Cycling career
- Sport: Cycling
- Discipline: Road
- Role: Rider

Maurice Meersman (17 February 1922 – 13 December 2008) was a Belgian racing cyclist. He rode in the 1948 Tour de France.

The race Memoriaal Maurice Meersman is named in his honor.

== Major results ==
1947
3rd Road race, National Road Championships
3rd Kampioenschap van Vlaanderen
8th Omloop Het Volk
1948
8th Omloop Het Volk
1949
5th Overall Ronde van Nederland
1st Stage 2
5th Liège–Bastogne–Liège
1950
2nd Omloop Het Volk
