= 1954 Omloop Het Volk =

Race details
- Dates: 14 March 1954
- Stages: 1
- Distance: 228 km (142 mi)
- Winning time: 6h 17' 00"

Results
	Winner	Karel De Baere (BEL)
	Second	Roger de Corte (BEL)
	Third	Jan de Valck (BEL)

The 1954 Omloop Het Volk was the tenth edition of the Omloop Het Volk cycle race and was held on 14 March 1954. The race started and finished in Ghent. The race was won by Karel De Baere.

== General classification ==
Final general classification
Rank	Rider	Time
1	Karel De Baere (BEL)	6h 17' 00"
2	Roger de Corte (BEL)	+ 0"
3	Jan de Valck (BEL)	+ 0"
4	René Mertens (BEL)	+ 0"
5	Ernest Sterckx (BEL)	+ 0"
6	Joseph van Stayen (BEL)	+ 0"
7	Lode Anthonis (BEL)	+ 0"
8	Gilbert Desmet (BEL)	+ 0"
9	André Vlayen (BEL)	+ 0"
10	Basiel Wambeke (BEL)	+ 0"
