= 1965 Omloop Het Volk =

Race details
- Dates: 5 March 1965
- Stages: 1
- Distance: 223 km (139 mi)
- Winning time: 5h 23' 00"

Results
	Winner	Noël De Pauw (BEL)
	Second	Marcel Van Den Bogaert (BEL)
	Third	Jos van der Vleuten (NED)

The 1965 Omloop Het Volk was the 20th edition of the Omloop Het Volk cycle race and was held on 5 March 1965. The race started and finished in Ghent. The race was won by Noel De Pauw.

== General classification ==
Final general classification
Rank	Rider	Time
1	Noël De Pauw (BEL)	5h 23' 00"
2	Marcel Van Den Bogaert (BEL)	+ 1' 17"
3	Jos van der Vleuten (NED)	+ 1' 17"
4	Jos Huysmans (BEL)	+ 1' 17"
5	Jan Janssen (NED)	+ 1' 17"
6	Guido Reybrouck (BEL)	+ 1' 17"
7	Piet Rentmeester (NED)	+ 1' 17"
8	Ludo Janssens (BEL)	+ 1' 17"
9	René Van Meenen (BEL)	+ 1' 17"
10	Roger Baguet (BEL)	+ 1' 17"
