= Dirk Baert =

Belgian cyclist (1949–2026)

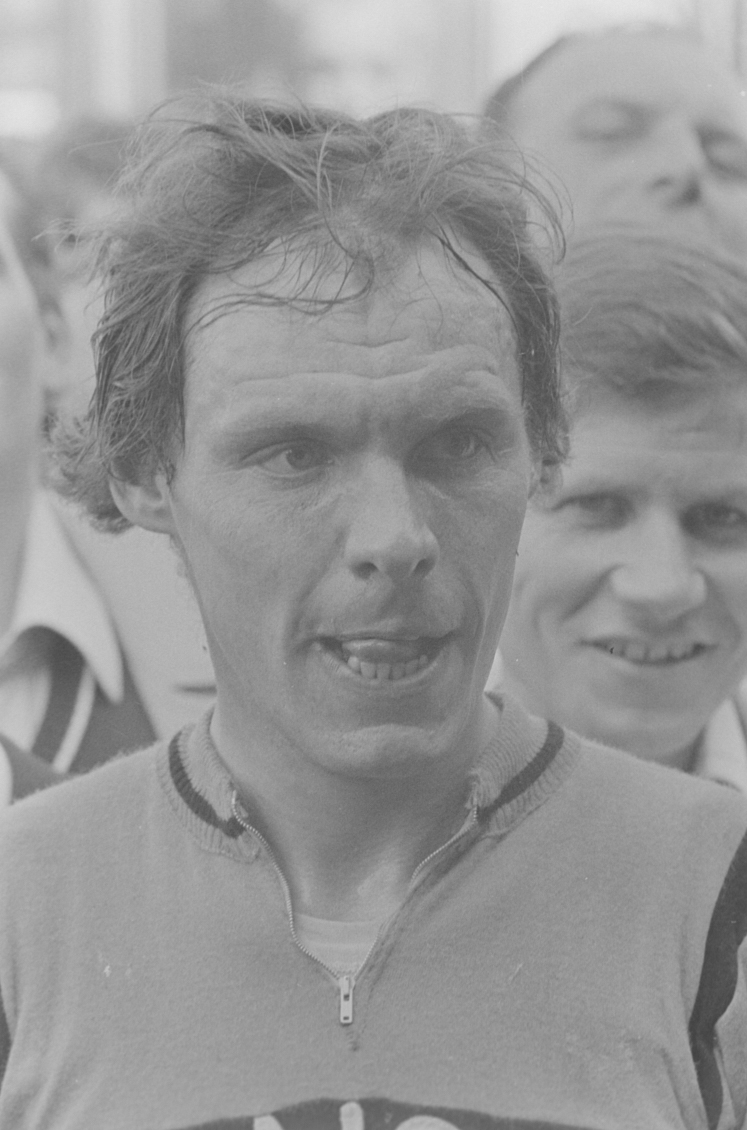
- Baert after winning Gullegem Koerse in 1980

Personal information
- Born: 14 February 1949 Zwevegem, Belgium
- Died: 7 July 2026 (aged 77)

Cycling career
- Sport: Cycling
- Role: Rider

Professional teams
- 1970: Hertekamp
- 1971–1972: Flandria
- 1973: Novy-Romy Pils-Total-Dubble Bubble
- 1974: MIC–Ludo–de Gribaldy
- 1975: Splendor–Struvay
- 1975–1979: Carlos
- 1980: Fangio–Amerlinckx–Campagnolo
- 1981–1982: Xagil
- 1983–1984: Lustrerie Mark Sport-Amelynck

Major wins
- One-day races and Classics Le Samyn (1976) Brussels–Ingooigem (1978) Track Championships World Track Championships Individual pursuit (1971) National Track Championships 1 km time trial (1968) Individual Pursuit (1970, 1974, 1975, 1976, 1977, 1981) Omnium (1984)
Medal record
Representing Belgium
Men's track cycling
Gold medal – first place	1971 Varese	Individual pursuit
Bronze medal – third place	1972 Marseille	Individual pursuit
Bronze medal – third place	1975 Rocourt	Individual pursuit

Dirk Baert (14 February 1949 – 7 July 2026) was a Belgian road and track cyclist. On track, he won one gold and two bronze medals in the individual pursuit at the world championships in 1971, 1972, and 1975, as well as several national championships. He competed at the 1968 Summer Olympics in the 1 km time trial and finished in 18th place. On the road, he won the Omloop van de Vlaamse Scheldeboorden (1975), Le Samyn (1976), Halle–Ingooigem (1978), and Grote 1-MeiPrijs (1979), as well as one stage of the Tour of Belgium (1974). He rode the Tour de France in 1974.

In 1981 Beart broke Ferdinand Bracke's 5 km record in Ghent's legendary indoor velodrome, het Kuipke. The record stood until 2019 when it was broken by then world hour record holder Victor Campenaerts.

After his career as a cyclist, Baert became national coach of the Belgian amateurs, and in 2013 he was also briefly team manager at the UCI Continental team BKCP-Powerplus, at the time the team of Niels Albert and a very young Michael Vanthourenhout.

Baert died on 7 July 2026, at the age of 77.

== Personal life ==
As a child, Dirk Baert overcame the effects of polio. He married Imelda, daughter of 1952 Tour of Flanders winner Roger Decock. The couple had a son and two daughters, one of which, Evelyne Baert, became a professional cyclist.

== Major results ==
=== Road ===
1972
1st stage 3b Four Days of Dunkirk
1st stage 4b Tour de Luxembourg
2nd Omloop van het Zuidwesten
3rd Egmont Cycling Race
3rd Brussels–Ingooigem
3rd GP Marcel Kint
1973
1st GP Stad Vilvoorde
1st stage 1 & 2b Tour de Picardie
1st Flèche Halloise
2nd Ronde van West-Vlaanderen
2nd Nationale Sluitingsprijs
2nd Renaix–Tournai–Renaix
2nd Circuit du Brabant Central
3rd Grand Prix de Denain
3rd GP Marcel Kint
1974
1st stage 1 Tour of Belgium
1st Renaix–Tournai–Renaix
1st Circuit des Frontières
2nd Grand Prix Pino Cerami
2nd Grand Prix des Nations
3rd Trèfle à Quatre Feuilles
1975
1st Omloop der drie Provinciën
1st Omloop van de Vlaamse Scheldeboorden
1st Trèfle à Quatre Feuilles
1st Circuit du Tournaisis
1st Omloop van West-Brabant
1st Grote Prijs Raf Jonckheere
2nd Omloop Mandel-Leie-Schelde
3rd Brussels–Ingooigem
1976
1st Le Samyn
1st Trèfle à Quatre Feuilles
1st Omloop van West-Brabant
1977
1st stage 3b Three Days of De Panne
1st Circuit du Tournaisis
3rd Circuit de Niel
1978
1st stage 1 Three Days of De Panne
1st stage 1 Omloop Mandel-Leie-Schelde
1st Brussels–Ingooigem
3rd Omloop van Neeroeteren
1979
1st Grote 1-MeiPrijs
3rd GP Marcel Kint
1980
1st Gullegem Koerse
1981
3rd Grand Prix de Denain
1982
1st Omloop van de Vlasstreek
2nd Grote 1-MeiPrijs
2nd Omloop der drie Provinciën
1983
2nd Raf Jonckheere
3rd Brussels–Ingooigem

=== Track ===
1968
1st National Track Championships, 1 km time trial
1970
1st National Track Championships, Individual pursuit
1971
1st UCI World Championships, Men's individual pursuit
1972
3rd UCI World Championships, Men's individual pursuit
1974
1st National Track Championships, Individual pursuit
1975
1st National Track Championships, Individual pursuit
3rd UCI World Championships, Men's individual pursuit
1976
1st National Track Championships, Individual pursuit
1977
1st National Track Championships, Individual pursuit
1981
1st National Track Championships, Individual pursuit
1984
1st National Track Championships, Omnium

== Honours and Awards ==
Honorary citizen of Deerlijk, Belgium
