= 1955 Omloop Het Volk =

Race details
- Dates: 6 March 1955
- Stages: 1
- Distance: 233 km (145 mi)
- Winning time: 7h 03' 00"

Results
	Winner	Lode Anthonis (BEL)
	Second	André Rosseel (BEL)
	Third	André Vlayen (BEL)

The 1955 Omloop Het Volk was the 11th edition of the Omloop Het Volk cycle race and was held on 6 March 1955. The race started and finished in Ghent. The race was won by Lode Anthonis.

== General classification ==
Final general classification
Rank	Rider	Time
1	Lode Anthonis (BEL)	7h 03' 00"
2	André Rosseel (BEL)	+ 0"
3	André Vlayen (BEL)	+ 0"
4	Karel Borgmans (BEL)	+ 0"
5	Joseph Theuns (BEL)	+ 0"
6	Isidore De Ryck (BEL)	+ 40"
7	Karel De Baere (BEL)	+ 40"
8	Marcel Ryckaert (BEL)	+ 40"
9	Germain Derycke (BEL)	+ 40"
10	Marcel Hendrickx (BEL)	+ 40"
