= 1951 Paris–Roubaix =

Cycling race

Race details
- Dates: 8 April 1951
- Stages: 1
- Distance: 247 km (153.5 mi)
- Winning time: 6h 07' 14"

Results
	Winner	Antonio Bevilacqua (ITA)
	Second	Louison Bobet (FRA)
	Third	Rik Van Steenbergen (BEL)

The 1951 Paris–Roubaix was the 49th edition of the Paris–Roubaix, a classic one-day cycle race in France. The single day event was held on 8 April 1951 and stretched 247 km (153 mi) from Paris to the finish at Roubaix Velodrome. The winner was Antonio Bevilacqua from Italy.

== Results ==
Final results (1–10)
Rank	Cyclist	Time
1	Antonio Bevilacqua (ITA)	6h 07' 14″
2	Louison Bobet (FRA)	+1' 32″
3	Rik Van Steenbergen (BEL)	+1' 32″
4	André Declerck (BEL)	+2' 05″
5	Jean Guéguen (FRA)	+2' 20″
6	Raymond Impanis (BEL)	+2' 20″
7	Bernard Gauthier (FRA)	+2' 20″
8	Lionel Van Brabant (BEL)	+2' 20″
9	Maurice Diot (FRA)	+2' 59″
10	Ferdinand Kübler (SUI)	+2' 59″
