= Isidoor De Ryck =

Belgian cyclist

Personal information
- Born: 5 September 1926 Temse, Belgium
- Died: 11 January 2009 (aged 82) Wilrijk, Belgium

Cycling career
- Sport: Cycling
- Discipline: Road
- Role: Rider

Isidoor De Ryck (5 September 1926 – 11 January 2009) was a Belgian racing cyclist. He rode in the 1950 Tour de France.

== Major results ==
1950
1st Overall Tour de Luxembourg

1st Stage 4

1951
6th Overall Critérium du Dauphiné Libéré

1st Stage 5

1952
1st Overall Deutschland Tour
1st Berg-Housse
4th Overall Volta a Catalunya

1st Stages 5 & 10

1953
1st Stage 3 Euskal Bizikleta
1955
6th Omloop Het Volk
