= 1940 Tour of Flanders =

Race details
- Dates: March 31, 1940
- Stages: 1
- Distance: 211 km (131.1 mi)
- Winning time: 6h 02' 00"

Results
	Winner	Achiel Buysse (BEL)
	Second	Georges Christiaens (BEL)
	Third	Briek Schotte (BEL)

The 24th edition of the Tour of Flanders cycling classic race was held on Sunday, 31 March 1940. Belgian Achiel Buysse won the Monument for a first time. In total, 34 of 103 riders finished.

== Route ==
The race started in Ghent and covered 211 km (131 miles) on the way to the finish in Wetteren.

The course featured 3 categorized climbs:

- Kwaremont
- Kruisberg
- Edelareberg

== Race report ==
22 year-old Achiel Buysse was able to escape earlier and arrived solo in Wetteren. He completed the race with an average of 34,970 km/h.

== General classification ==
=== Final general classification ===
Rank	Rider	Team	Time
1	Achiel Buysse (BEL)	Dilecta–Wolber	6h 02' 00"
2	Georges Christiaens (BEL)	Helyett–Hutchinson	20"
3	Briek Schotte (BEL)	Groene Leeuw	s.t.
4	Albert Hendrickx (BEL)	Labor	1' 15"
5	Jan Staeren (BEL)	Labor	4' 15"
6	Armand Gilles (BEL)	Alcyon–Dunlop	4' 30"
7	Albert Dubuisson (BEL)	Helyett–Hutchinson	4' 35"
8	Petrus van Teemsche (BEL)	Individual	s.t.
9	Albert van Wesemael (BEL)	Individual	s.t.
10	Cyriel van Overberghe (BEL)	Pélissier	s.t.
