= 1959 Gent–Wevelgem =

Race details
- Dates: 4 April 1959
- Stages: 1
- Distance: 221.2 km (137.4 mi)
- Winning time: 5h 10' 16"

Results
	Winner	Leon Vandaele (BEL)
	Second	Jos Hoevenaers (BEL)
	Third	Jacques Anquetil (FRA)

The 1959 Gent–Wevelgem was the 21st edition of the Belgian Gent–Wevelgem cycle race and was held on 4 April 1959. The race started in Ghent and finished in Wevelgem. The race was won by Leon Vandaele.

== General classification ==
Final general classification

Rank	Rider	Time
1	Leon Vandaele (BEL)	5h 10' 16"
2	Jos Hoevenaers (BEL)	+ 0"
3	Jacques Anquetil (FRA)	+ 0"
4	Michel Stolker (NED)	+ 0"
5	Armand Desmet (BEL)	+ 0"
6	Willy Vannitsen (BEL)	+ 2' 30"
7	André Noyelle (BEL)	+ 2' 48"
8	Gilbert Desmet (BEL)	+ 2' 48"
9	Karel Clerckx (BEL)	+ 2' 48"
10	Georges Decraeye (BEL)	+ 2' 48"
