= Leon Vandaele =

Belgian cyclist (1933–2000)

- Vandaele before 1959 Gent–Wevelgem, which he won

Personal information
- Full name: Leon Vandaele
- Born: 24 February 1933 Ruddervoorde, Belgium
- Died: 30 April 2000 (aged 67) Oostkamp, Belgium

Cycling career
- Sport: Cycling
- Disciplines: Road, track
- Role: Rider

Major wins
- One-day races and Classics Paris–Roubaix (1958) Kuurne–Brussels–Kuurne (1954, 1961) Kampioenschap van Vlaanderen (1956, 1957, 1958) Paris–Brussels (1957) Brussels–Ingooigem (1958) Gent–Wevelgem (1959)

Leon Vandaele (24 February 1933 in Ruddervoorde – 30 April 2000 in Oostkamp) was a Belgian professional road bicycle racer. His biggest victory was the 1958 Paris–Roubaix.

== Major results ==
=== Road ===
1952
1st Roubaix-Cassel-Roubaix
1st Ruddervoorde Koerse
1953
1st Ruddervoorde Koerse
1st Omloop Gemeente Melle
1954
1st Kuurne–Brussels–Kuurne
5th Gent–Wevelgem
1956
1st Kampioenschap van Vlaanderen
1st Omloop van het Houtland
3rd Tour of Flanders
1957
1st Kampioenschap van Vlaanderen
1st Overall Driedaagse van Antwerpen

1st stage 1

1st Paris–Brussels
1st Brussels–Ingooigem
1st Milano–Mantova
1st Ruddervoorde Koerse
1st Grote Prijs Raf Jonckheere
2nd Kuurne–Brussels–Kuurne
3rd Paris–Roubaix
3rd Omloop Het Volk
7th Road race, UCI World Championships
1958
1st Paris–Roubaix
1st Kampioenschap van Vlaanderen
1st Grand Prix Flandria
1st Omloop van de Fruitstreek
1st Vlaamse Pijl
2nd Brussels–Ingooigem
9th Overall Volta a la Comunitat Valenciana

1st stage 3 (TTT), 6 & 7

10th Milan–San Remo
1959
1st Gent–Wevelgem
1st Omloop van het Houtland
1st stage 1 Tour of Luxembourg
1st stage 3 Paris–Nice
2nd Elfstedenronde
3rd Milan–San Remo
5th Omloop Het Volk
8th Paris–Roubaix
1960
1st Tielt–Antwerpen–Tielt
1st Omloop van het Houtland
1st De Panne
6th Gent–Wevelgem
1961
1st Kuurne–Brussels–Kuurne
1st stage 2 Tour of Luxembourg
1st Nokere Koerse
3rd Dwars door Vlaanderen
1962
1st Omloop Mandel-Leie-Schelde
1963
1st Ronde Oost-Vlaanderen
2nd Kuurne–Brussels–Kuurne
3rd Elfstedenronde
3rd GP Dr. Eugeen Roggeman
1964
1st Grote 1-MeiPrijs
1st Elfstedenronde
1st Omloop der drie Provinciën
2nd Nokere Koerse
2nd National Road Championships – Interclubs road race

=== Track ===
1955
Belgian National Track Championships

2nd Omnium
2nd Madison (with Josef De Beuckelaer)

3rd Six Days of Paris (with Emiel Severeyns and Paul De Paepe)
1956
3rd Six Days of Paris (with Lucien Acou and Arsène Ryckaert)
1957
3rd Six Days of Paris (with Willy Vannitsen and Alfred De Bruyne)
