= Ernest Sterckx =

Belgian cyclist (1922–1975)

- Sterckx in 1947

Personal information
- Born: 1 December 1922 Westerlo, Belgium
- Died: 3 February 1975 (aged 52) Leuven, Belgium

Cycling career
- Sport: Cycling
- Role: Rider

Professional teams
- 1943: Individual
- 1944: A. Trialoux-Wolber
- 1945: Alcyon-Dunlop
- 1946: La Française-Dunlop
- 1947-1948: Alcyon-Dunlop
- 1949: Ganna
- 1950: Allegro
- 1951: Terrot-Wolber
- 1952: Peugeot-Dunlop
- 1955-1958: L'Avenir

Major wins
- Stage races Tour of Belgium (1949) One-day races and Classics Gent–Wevelgem (1946) La Flèche Wallonne (1947) Paris–Brussels (1947) Scheldeprijs (1951) Omloop Het Volk (1952, 1953, 1956)

Ernest Sterckx (1 December 1922 – 3 February 1975) was a Belgian professional racing cyclist. He won the 1946 Gent-Wevelgem and Omloop Het Nieuwsblad in 1952, 1953 and 1956.

In 2023, a statue of him was erected in Heultje, Belgium.

== Major results ==
1943
1st GP Frans Melckenbeeck
3rd Schaal Sels
5th La Flèche Wallonne
1944
1st Ronde van Limburg
1946
1st Gullegem Koerse
1st Gent–Wevelgem
2nd Scheldeprijs
1947
1st La Flèche Wallonne
1st Brussel–Ingooigem
1st Heistse Pijl
1st Paris–Brussels
1st Stages 2 & 3 GP Prior
1948
1st De Drie Zustersteden
1st Omloop van Midden-België
3rd National Championships, road race
1949
1st Overall Tour of Belgium
1st Nokere Koerse
3rd Schaal Sels
3rd Scheldeprijs
4th Tour of Flanders
6th Omloop Het Volk
8th Milan–San Remo
1950
1st Schaal Sels
1st Omloop der Vlaamse Gewesten
3rd Scheldeprijs
3rd GP Marcel Kint
1951
1st Scheldeprijs
1st Ronde van Limburg
1st Bruxelles-Bost
8th Liège–Bastogne–Liège
1952
1st Omloop Het Volk
1st Omloop van Midden-België
1st GP Benego
1st Bruxelles-Bost
1st Circuit de Hesbaye-Condroz
2nd GP Stad Vilvoorde
3rd Schaal Sels
3rd Scheldeprijs
3rd Antwerpse Havenpijl
3rd Omloop der Vlaamse Gewesten
3rd Ronde van Limburg
1953
1st Omloop Het Volk
1st Stage 2 & 4 Tour of Belgium
1st GP Raymond Impanis
1st Ronde van Brabant
3rd Heistse Pijl
1954
2nd GP Beeckman
3rd Scheldeprijs
3rd Gent–Wevelgem
5th Omloop Het Volk
1955
1st Ronde van Limburg
1st Ronde van Haspengouw
2nd Flèche Hesbignonne
3rd Antwerpse Havenpijl
5th National Championships, road race
6th Paris–Roubaix
9th Gent–Wevelgem
1956
1st Omloop Het Volk
1st Stage 2 Dwars door België
9th Gent–Wevelgem
9th Tour of Flanders
1957
2nd Hoegaarden–Antwerpen–Hoegaarden
