= Rudy Colman =

Belgian cyclist

Personal information
- Born: 15 January 1956 (age 70) Ghent, Belgium

Cycling career
- Sport: Cycling
- Discipline: Road
- Role: Rider

Professional teams
- 1978: Mini Flat-Boule d'Or
- 1979-1980: IJsboerke-Warncke Eis
- 1981-1982: Splendor-Wickes Bouwmarkt
- 1983: De Freddy-Libertas
- 1984: TeVeBlad-Perlav-Moser

Rudy Colman (born 15 January 1956) is a Belgian former racing cyclist. He rode in the 1979 Tour de France.

== Major results ==
1976
1st Omloop der Vlaamse Gewesten Amateurs
1978
3rd GP Stad Zottegem
5th Nokere Koerse
1979
1st Omloop der Drie Provinciën
1st Puivelde Koerse
3rd Leiedal Koerse
5th Nokere Koerse
1980
1st Stage 1 Tour de l'Aude
1st Berner Rundfahrt
1st Tour du Nord-Ouest
2nd Halse Pijl
4th Omloop van het Waasland
1981
9th Brabantse Pijl
1982
1st GP Stad Zottegem
1st Prix de Mellet
1983
1st Poperinge–Harelbeke
