= Eric Van De Wiele =

Belgian cyclist

Personal information
- Born: 27 October 1952 (age 73) Ghent, Belgium

Cycling career
- Sport: Cycling
- Role: Rider

Eric Van De Wiele (born 27 October 1952) is a former Belgian racing cyclist. He rode in four editions of the Tour de France between 1980 and 1983.
