= Jean Bogaerts =

Belgian cyclist (1925–2017)

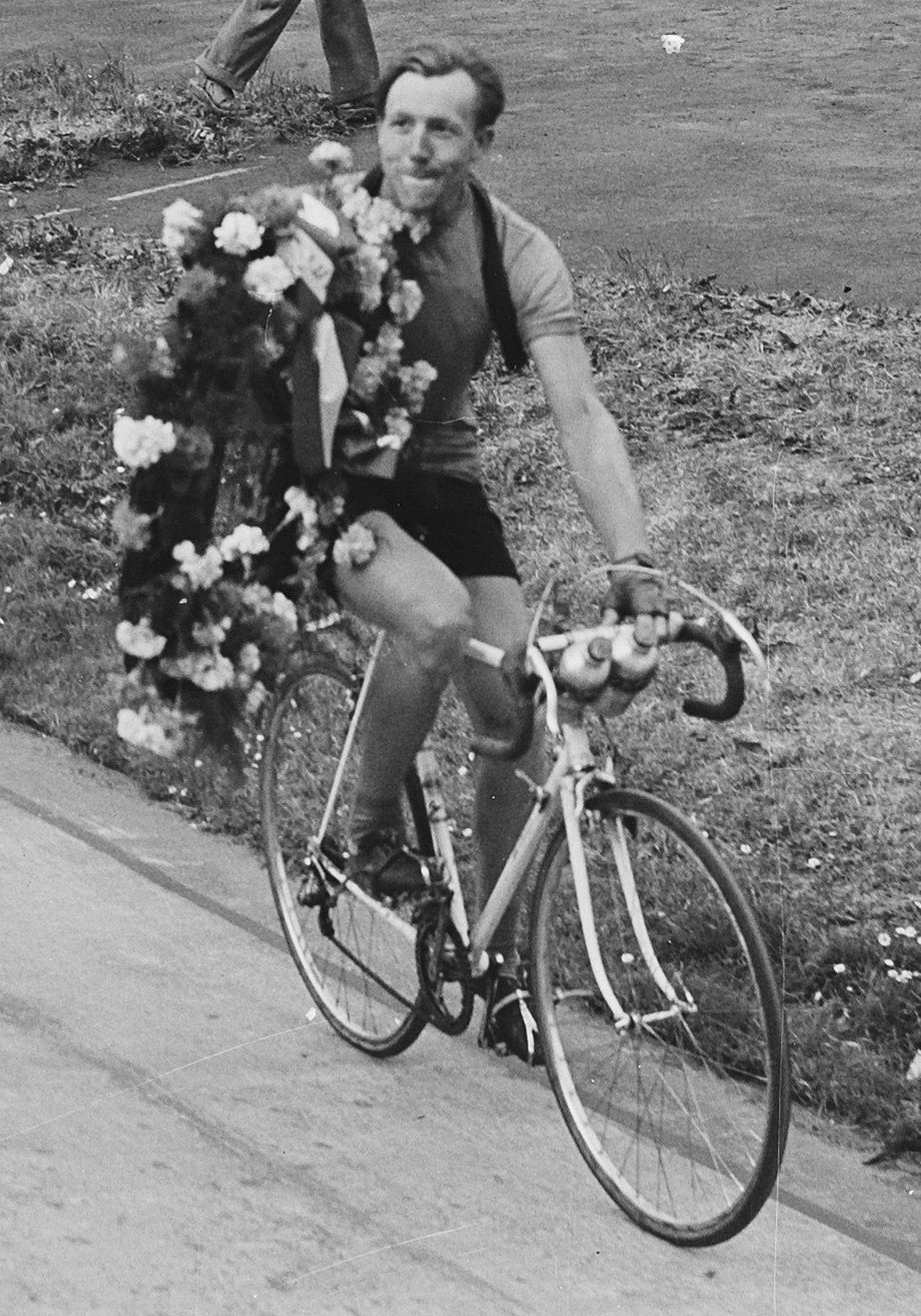

Personal information
- Born: 19 January 1925 Koningslo, Belgium
- Died: 28 January 2017 (aged 92)

Cycling career
- Sport: Cycling
- Role: Rider

Jean Bogaerts (19 January 1925 – 28 January 2017) was a Belgian professional racing cyclist. He won the Omloop Het Nieuwsblad in 1945 and 1951.
