= Odiel Van Den Meersschaut =

Belgian cyclist

Personal information
- Full name: Odiel Van Den Meersschaut
- Born: 25 December 1919 Melsen, Belgium
- Died: 16 March 1993 (aged 73) Ghent, Belgium

Cycling career
- Sport: Cycling
- Discipline: Road
- Role: Rider

Odiel Van Den Meersschaut (25 December 1919 – 16 March 1993) was a Belgian racing cyclist. He won the Belgian national road race title in 1940.
