= Willy Van Malderghem =

Belgian cyclist

Personal information
- Born: 16 May 1949 (age 77)

Cycling career
- Sport: Cycling
- Role: Rider

Willy Van Malderghem (born 16 May 1949) is a Belgian racing cyclist. He rode in the 1972 Tour de France.
