= Lionel Van Brabant =

Belgian cyclist

Personal information
- Born: 24 June 1926 Zwevegem, Belgium
- Died: 3 July 2004 (aged 78) Kortrijk, Belgium

Cycling career
- Sport: Cycling

Lionel Van Brabant (24 June 1926 – 3 July 2004) was a Belgian cyclist. He finished in eighth place in the 1951 Paris–Roubaix.
