= Joseph Mathy =

Belgian cyclist

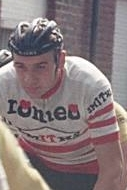

Personal information
- Born: 8 July 1944
- Died: 25 August 1969 (aged 25)

Cycling career
- Sport: Cycling
- Role: Rider

Joseph Mathy (8 July 1944 – 25 August 1969) was a Belgian racing cyclist. He rode in the 1966 Tour de France.
