= Lode Anthonis =

Belgian cyclist (1922–1992)

- Anthonis around 1952

Personal information
- Full name: Lode Anthonis
- Born: 28 November 1922 Tremelo, Belgium
- Died: 12 January 1992 (aged 69) Bonheiden, Belgium

Cycling career
- Sport: Cycling
- Discipline: Road
- Role: Rider

Professional teams
- 1948–1949: Erka–Dunlop
- 1950–1953: Lion Rapide
- 1955: Bertin–D'Alessandro
- 1956–1957: Plume–Vainqueur
- 1958–1962: Vedette–Verveer

Lode Anthonis (28 November 1922 – 12 January 1992) was a Belgian racing cyclist who competed professionally from 1948 to 1962. He won the Belgian national road race title in 1951. He is buried in Tremelo.

== Major results ==
1948
7th Nationale Sluitingprijs
1949
1st Kampenhout–Charleroi–Kampenhout
4th Nationale Sluitingprijs
5th Omloop Het Volk
8th Tour of Flanders
9th Overall Tour of Belgium
1951
1st Road race, National Road Championships
1952
2nd Roubaix–Huy
6th Overall Dwars door België
9th Omloop Het Volk
10th Tour of Flanders
1953
3rd Paris–Brussels
1954
7th Omloop Het Volk
1955
1st Omloop Het Volk
7th Gent–Wevelgem
10th Tour of Flanders
1957
6th Nationale Sluitingprijs
