= André Pieters =

Belgian cyclist

Personal information
- Born: 10 September 1922 Lendelede, Belgium
- Died: 22 February 2001 (aged 78) Izegem, Belgium

Cycling career
- Sport: Cycling
- Role: Rider

André Pieters (10 September 1922 – 22 February 2001) was a Belgian professional racing cyclist. He won the Omloop Het Nieuwsblad in 1946.
