= Valère Ollivier =

Belgian cyclist

- Ollivier around 1952

Personal information
- Full name: Valère Ollivier
- Born: 21 September 1921 Roeselare, Belgium
- Died: 10 February 1958 (aged 36) Roeselare, Belgium

Cycling career
- Sport: Cycling
- Discipline: Road
- Role: Rider

Valère Ollivier (21 September 1921 – 10 February 1958) was a Belgian racing cyclist. He won the Belgian national road race title in 1949, Gent–Wevelgem in 1948, and Kuurne–Brussels–Kuurne in 1945 and in 1950.
