= André Declerck =

Belgian cyclist

Personal information
- Born: 17 August 1919 Koekelare, Belgium
- Died: 13 September 1967 (aged 48) Roeselare, Belgium

Cycling career
- Sport: Cycling
- Role: Rider

André Declerck (17 August 1919 – 13 September 1967) was a Belgian racing cyclist. He rode in the 1948 Tour de France. He finished in sixth place in the 1949 Paris–Roubaix and fourth in the 1951 Paris–Roubaix.
