= 2011 Team Sky season =

Team Sky
- 2011 season
- UCI code: SKY
- Status: UCI WorldTeam
- World Tour Rank: 2nd (1069 points)
- Manager: Dave Brailsford
- Main sponsor(s): BSkyB
- Based: United Kingdom
- Bicycles: Pinarello
- Groupset: Shimano

Season victories
- One-day races: 3
- Stage race overall: 5
- Stage race stages: 21
- National Championships: 3
- Most wins: Ben Swift, Edvald Boasson Hagen (5 wins each)
- Best ranked rider: Bradley Wiggins (9th)

The 2011 season for the Team Sky cycling team began in January at the Bay Classic Series and ended in October at the Noosa Grand Prix. As a UCI ProTeam, they were automatically invited and obligated to send a squad to every event in the UCI World Tour. Improving upon 20 victories in the 2010 season, Team Sky managed 28 victories during the season, including four Grand Tour stage wins, two each at the Tour de France and the Vuelta a España. Also at the Vuelta, the team achieved their best Grand Tour showing to date with Chris Froome and Bradley Wiggins finishing the race in second and third places – behind Geox–TMC's Juan José Cobo – having both held the red jersey for the general classification lead at some stage of the race. Outside of the Grand Tours, the team achieved stage victories at four other World Tour events and the overall victory at two, with Wiggins winning the pre-Tour warmup event, the Critérium du Dauphiné and Edvald Boasson Hagen claimed victory at the Eneco Tour held in Belgium and the Netherlands. The team were not as successful in single-day races, with three wins taken by Christopher Sutton, Boasson Hagen and Mathew Hayman. With the performances of Froome, Wiggins and Boasson Hagen, Team Sky made a substantial leap up the World Tour rankings; having finished fifteenth in the 2010 UCI World Ranking, Team Sky finished as runners-up in the 2011 rankings, just 40 points behind overall winners Omega Pharma–Lotto.

On 13 June 2019, the sport's governing body, the Union Cycliste International (UCI), announced that Juan José Cobo had been found guilty of an anti-doping violation, according to findings from his biological passport. As a result, the UCI penalised him with a three-year period of ineligibility. Cobo was officially stripped of the title on 18 June 2019. On 17 July 2019, as the time for Cobo to appeal the decision expired with no application, the UCI announced it recognised Chris Froome as the 2011 champion, making him retroactively the first Briton to win a Grand Tour, and simultaneously promoting Bradley Wiggins to 2nd place.

== 2011 roster ==
Ages as of 1 January 2011.

Rider	Date of birth
Davide Appollonio (ITA)	2 June 1989 (aged 21)
Kurt Asle Arvesen (NOR)	9 February 1975 (aged 35)
John-Lee Augustyn (RSA)	10 August 1986 (aged 24)
Michael Barry (CAN)	18 December 1975 (aged 35)
Edvald Boasson Hagen (NOR)	17 May 1987 (aged 23)
Kjell Carlström (FIN)	18 October 1976 (aged 34)
Dario Cioni (ITA)	2 December 1974 (aged 36)
Steve Cummings (GBR)	19 March 1981 (aged 29)
Russell Downing (GBR)	23 August 1978 (aged 32)
Alex Dowsett (GBR)	3 October 1988 (aged 22)
Juan Antonio Flecha (ESP)	17 September 1977 (aged 33)
Chris Froome (GBR)	20 May 1985 (aged 25)
Simon Gerrans (AUS)	16 May 1980 (aged 30)
Mathew Hayman (AUS)	20 April 1978 (aged 32)
Greg Henderson (NZL)	9 October 1976 (aged 34)

Rider	Date of birth
Jeremy Hunt (GBR)	12 March 1974 (aged 36)
Peter Kennaugh (GBR)	15 June 1989 (aged 21)
Christian Knees (GER)	5 March 1981 (aged 29)
Thomas Löfkvist (SWE)	4 April 1984 (aged 26)
Lars Petter Nordhaug (NOR)	14 May 1984 (aged 26)
Serge Pauwels (BEL)	21 November 1983 (aged 27)
Morris Possoni (ITA)	1 July 1984 (aged 26)
Michael Rogers (AUS)	20 December 1979 (aged 31)
Ian Stannard (GBR)	25 May 1987 (aged 23)
Chris Sutton (AUS)	10 September 1984 (aged 26)
Ben Swift (GBR)	5 November 1987 (aged 23)
Geraint Thomas (GBR)	25 May 1986 (aged 24)
Rigoberto Urán (COL)	26 January 1987 (aged 23)
Bradley Wiggins (GBR)	28 April 1980 (aged 30)
Xabier Zandio (ESP)	17 March 1977 (aged 33)

Riders who joined the team for the 2011 season

Rider	2010 team
Alex Dowsett	Trek-Livestrong
Rigoberto Urán	Caisse d'Epargne
Xabier Zandio	Caisse d'Epargne
Jeremy Hunt	Cervélo TestTeam
Davide Appollonio	Cervélo TestTeam
Michael Rogers	Team HTC–Columbia
Christian Knees	Team Milram

Riders who left the team during or after the 2010 season

Rider	2011 team
Sylvain Calzati	Bretagne–Schuller
Nicolas Portal	Retired
Davide Viganò	Leopard Trek

== One-day races ==
=== Spring classics ===
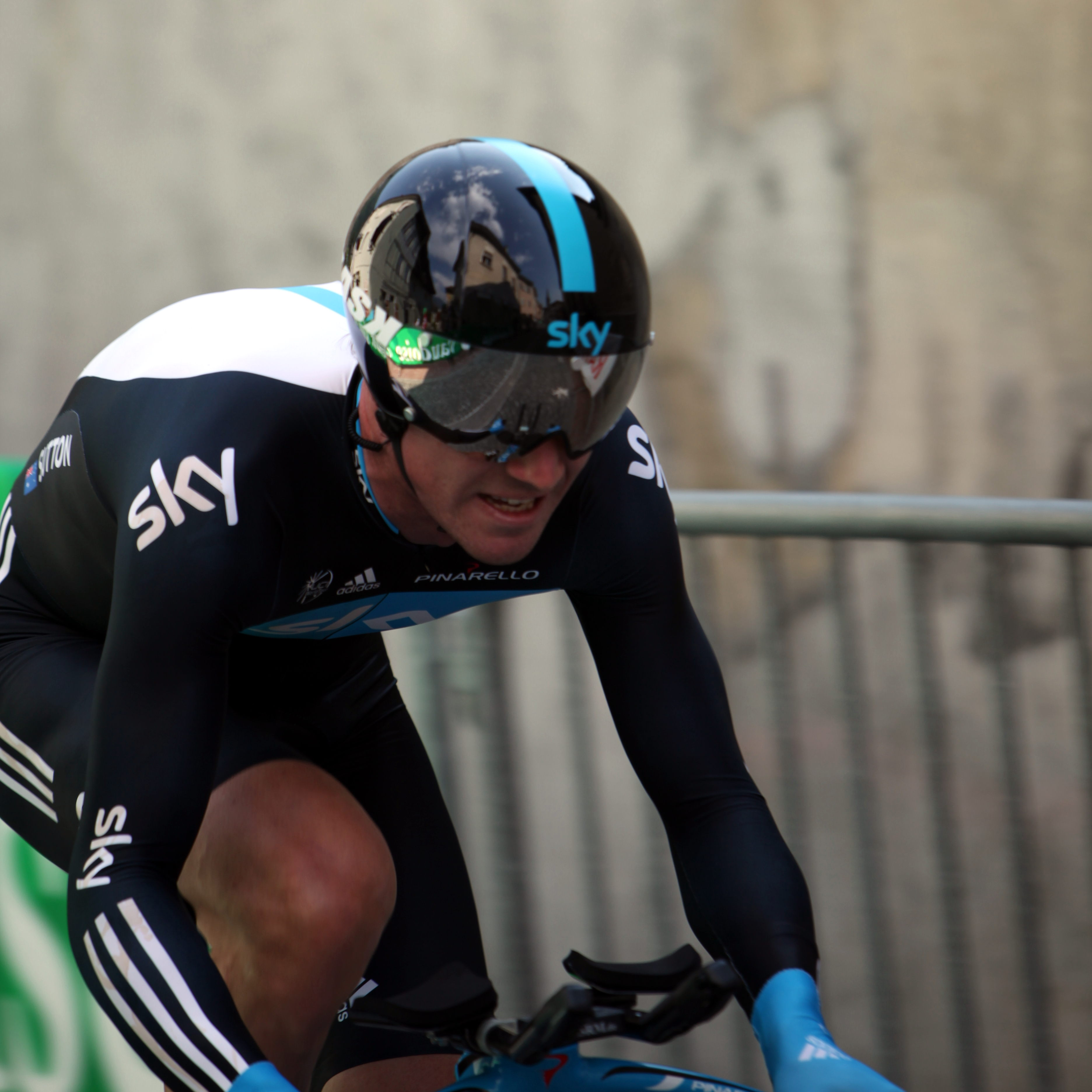
Christopher Sutton, pictured later in the year at the Tour de Romandie, became the first Australian rider to win Kuurne–Brussels–Kuurne.

The team's first single-day race of the year was Omloop Het Nieuwsblad in February, where Flecha had tasted success in 2010. Prior to the race, Flecha stated that it would be difficult for him to win the race again, but felt that the team was in a good position to aid him along the way. In the race, following an earlier attack from former Rabobank team-mate Sebastian Langeveld, Flecha attacked from the chasing group with 30 kilometres (18.6 mi) left, on the Paddestraat, having trailed Langeveld by over a minute on the road. Flecha caught him halfway to the finish, and the two worked together on the run into Ghent, in order to stay clear. Flecha tried to gap Langeveld with 5 kilometres (3.1 mi) left, but could not sustain a big enough margin to get clear. The two riders contested the sprint in the wet conditions, and Langeveld just got the better of Flecha on the line, winning by 10 centimetres (3.9 in). Hayman made it two Team Sky riders on the podium, as he finished the best of the chasing group, in third place. Kuurne–Brussels–Kuurne, held the next day, resulted in the team's first single-day win of the year. Flecha and Stannard tried to break the field with around 70 kilometres (43.5 mi) left in the race, but were eventually pulled back as were several other riders down the road from their group. After several further attempts by riders to gain breathing space from the field, it was left for a sprint finish to decide the winner of the race. Flecha pulled on the front to set up one of their sprinters in the race, Boasson Hagen or Sutton, and when Flecha stepped aside, it was left to Boasson Hagen to build the pace and released Sutton to the line, who won by almost a bike length. In March, Thomas put in a strong performance in Dwars door Vlaanderen; with 20 kilometres (12.4 mi) left in the race, Thomas and Saxo Bank–SunGard's Nick Nuyens attacked off the front of the peloton to catch up with the leaders on the road, Landbouwkrediet's Frédéric Amorison and Rob Goris of Veranda's Willems–Accent. Nuyens and Thomas later dropped the pair and contested the sprint finish between them, with Nuyens taking the victory. April started with another top-ten finish in the second of the Cobbled classics, as Thomas finished tenth in the Tour of Flanders, having bridged up to the lead group prior to the final climb of the race, the cobbled Bosberg hill, 10 kilometres (6.2 mi) from the finish in Meerbeke. The following weekend, Flecha finished in ninth place at Paris–Roubaix, leading home team-mate Hayman, 47 seconds down on race-winner Johan Vansummeren of Garmin–Cervélo. The Amstel Gold Race was next up, and the team were aiming to ride for Gerrans and Nordhaug. Gerrans did indeed feature in the closing stages of the race, but only for third place as Omega Pharma–Lotto's Philippe Gilbert and Team Katusha rider Joaquim Rodríguez had already accelerated away from the field. Urán placed best for the team at Liège–Bastogne–Liège, finishing in fifth place. The team also sent squads to Milan–San Remo, Gent–Wevelgem, the Scheldeprijs, and La Flèche Wallonne, but placed no higher than 19th in any of these races.

=== Autumn races ===
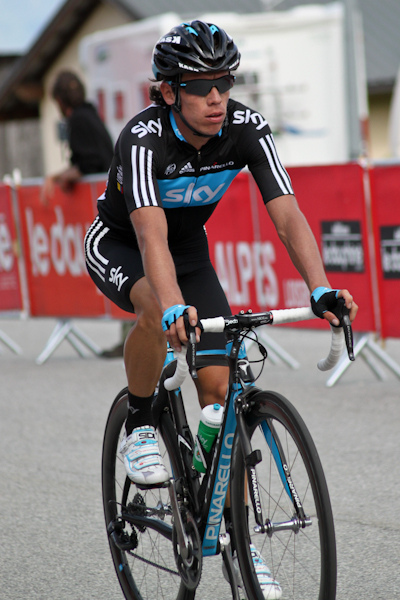
Rigoberto Urán, pictured during the Critérium du Dauphiné, placed in the top ten in three single-day races during the second half of the season, and finished 19th at the Giro di Lombardia.

Shortly after the Tour de France, Urán finished within the lead group at the Clásica de San Sebastián, where he placed ninth. In August, Boasson Hagen tasted success in Germany, by winning the Vattenfall Cyclassics; Boasson Hagen attacked from 250 metres (820 ft) out, and held off Gerald Ciolek, who took second place for Quick-Step, while Borut Božič completed the podium for Vacansoleil–DCM. The following week, at the GP Ouest-France, Gerrans finished second behind Lampre–ISD's Grega Bole, after Bole had attacked the field within the final 2 kilometres (1.2 mi) of the race. For the Grand Prix Cycliste de Québec, Sky looked to control the race in order to protect Urán, Gerrans and Boasson Hagen. Urán did eventually feature in the race's closing stages; he made it into a ten-man lead group, and when Rabobank's Robert Gesink attacked with 5 kilometres (3.1 mi) left, Urán went with him but both riders were closed down quickly. Philippe Gilbert then attacked the group again and eventually beat Gesink to the line, with Urán completing the podium, nine seconds behind the pair. In October, Gerrans and Nordhaug both took top ten placements in the Coppa Sabatini race in Tuscany, which also saw Urán make an error by mistakenly believing that he had won the race, when there was still another lap of the circuit to be completed. The same day, in France, Hayman won the Paris–Bourges event in a sprint finish, having been in a breakaway from 15 kilometres (9.3 mi) into the 190.4 kilometres (118.3 mi) race. Two other Team Sky riders finished in the top ten, as Henderson finished third behind Saxo Bank–SunGard rider Baden Cooke, while Sutton finished in tenth position, the last rider to finish in the same time as Hayman, who claimed his first victory since the 2006 Commonwealth Games. Urán took another third-place finish, in the Giro dell'Emilia, coming home in a group of four riders, over 20 seconds behind race-winner Carlos Betancur of Acqua & Sapone. The next day, at Paris–Tours, Stannard made several aggressive attacks before the race had reached Tours, but could not react to a joint move by Marco Marcato of Vacansoleil–DCM and BMC Racing Team rider Greg Van Avermaet, who contested the top two places at the finish. Stannard attacked in the final 2 kilometres (1.2 mi) but could only finish fourth in the end, just behind Saxo Bank–SunGard's Kasper Klostergaard. The team's year was concluded by a tenth-place finish by Löfkvist at the Giro del Piemonte, and third-place finishes for Dowsett at the Chrono des Nations, and Sutton at the Noosa Grand Prix. The team also sent squads to the Grand Prix Cycliste de Montréal, the Gran Premio Bruno Beghelli, and the Giro di Lombardia, but placed no higher than 15th in any of these races.

== Stage races ==
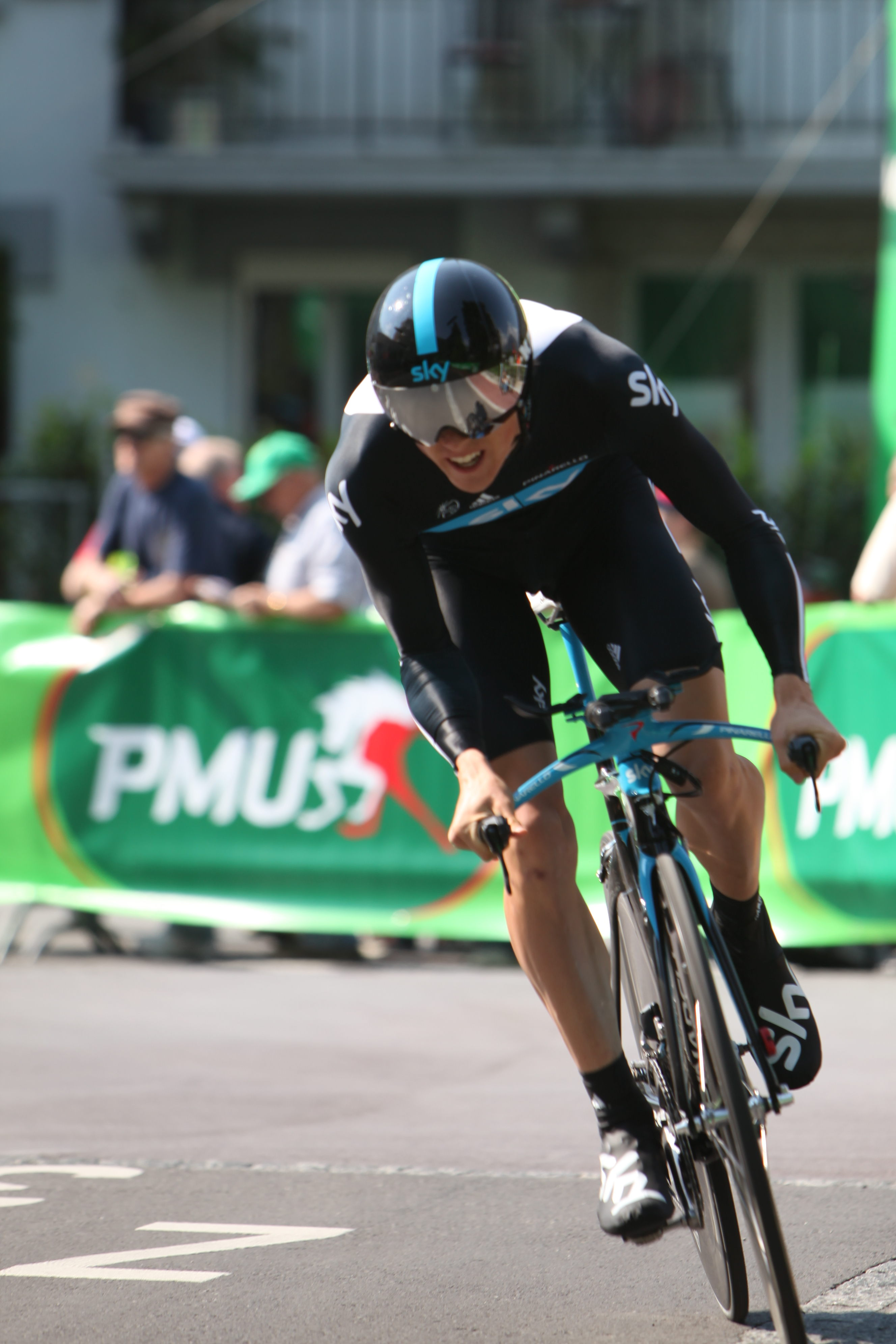
Ben Swift, pictured at the Tour de Romandie in April, won the most stages for the team in 2011, winning five in total, including three during World Tour races.

At the Tour Down Under in January, Swift took the team's first win of the season in the second stage into Mannum. Swift avoided two crashes within the closing 3 kilometres (1.9 mi), which saw several of his team-mates fall, to out-sprint Australian pair Robbie McEwen (Team RadioShack) and Graeme Brown (Rabobank) to the line. After two further top-ten placings on the fourth and fifth stages, Swift claimed his second stage victory on the final stage, a circuit race in Adelaide. Within the closing stages, the team set up a perfectly executed sprint lead-out for Swift, and also Henderson; the two riders completed a 1–2 finish, and with ten bonus seconds on offer on the line for the stage winner, Swift moved from sixth place to an eventual third-place finish in the general classification.

February's Volta ao Algarve resulted in Cummings taking a stage win on the third stage, a mountain-top finish at the Alto do Malhão; having been a part of five-man sprint to the line, Cummings got the better of HTC–Highroad's Tejay van Garderen and Saxo Bank–SunGard rider Alberto Contador – only competing in the race after being cleared of doping charges the day before the race – and moved into the race lead, holding an advantage of six seconds over Contador. He held the lead until the final day time-trial, where he finished over a minute down on the quickest time and fell to seventh place in the general classification. Henderson won a stage at Paris–Nice in March, taking the second stage into Amilly, in a sprint finish after a lead-out from Thomas. Wiggins finished the event third overall, after taking the same place on the sixth stage time trial. Swift continued his strong run at the Vuelta a Castilla y León in April, where he won the final stage of the race after help from Downing, to take his third win of the season. Swift repeated the feat a fortnight later at a World Tour event, as he won the final stage of the Tour de Romandie in Geneva.

Following on from that success, the team took two more stage wins in the Tour of California, held later in May. After stage one was cancelled due to a snowstorm and unsafe riding conditions, the second stage was run over a shorter distance, and rain started to fall as the race headed into the finishing circuit in Sacramento, where the team came to the front to assume control for the in-form Swift; he was favored instead of the team's regular sprinter Henderson, who had not raced since the Scheldeprijs in early April, but Henderson was utilised as the leadout man for Swift, and released him to his fifth victory of 2011, securing the first yellow and green jerseys – for the lead of both the general classification and the sprints classification – of the race. The following day, it was Henderson's turn to win a stage, although not in the manner that he had been accustomed to. Henderson led the sprint from 500 metres (1,600 ft) out, but Swift was not in a position to challenge for the sprint, so it was left to Henderson to bring home the laurels for the team, winning the sprint by a bike length, and assuming the race lead on countback from Swift. Henderson surrendered the race lead on the mountainous fourth stage, however, but both he and Swift took further third place stage finishes before the Tour was complete.

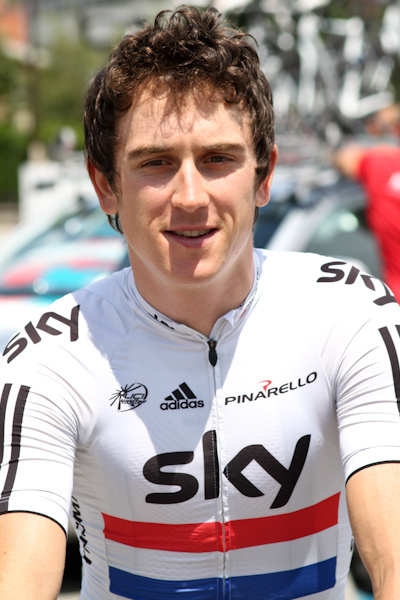
Geraint Thomas, pictured in the British national road race champion's jersey at the Critérium du Dauphiné, claimed his first overall stage race victory, at the Bayern-Rundfahrt.

At the end of May, the team also had a successful outing in the Bayern-Rundfahrt, held in Bavaria, Germany. In stage one, Boasson Hagen took his first victory of the season after a lead-out by Sutton, and won the race's longest stage – over a distance of 223.2 kilometres (138.7 mi) – since its inception. Boasson Hagen retained his overall lead with third place in stage two, but lost it to HTC–Highroad rider Michael Albasini after the third stage, which Albasini won ahead of Thomas – after the pair, along with six other riders made a breakaway – with Thomas moving into second place overall. In the penultimate stage time-trial, Wiggins comfortably won the stage; his margin over world champion Fabian Cancellara (Leopard Trek) was 32 seconds. Boasson Hagen finished third, 45 seconds slower than Wiggins, and Thomas took the overall lead with a fifth-place finish. Thomas confirmed his first overall stage race win, with an eleventh-place finish on the final stage. Boasson Hagen took third place on the stage, and also won the sprints classification, with the squad winning the teams classification by over two minutes.

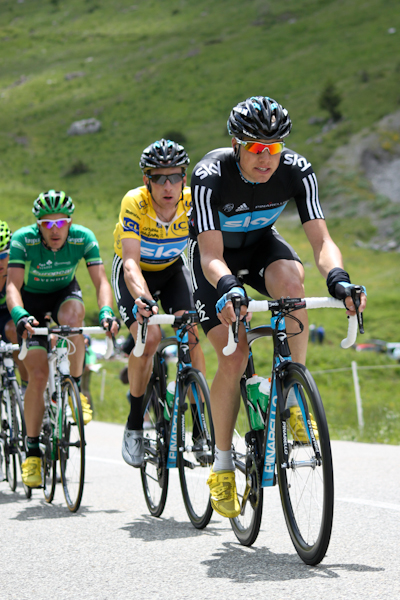
Bradley Wiggins took his biggest road racing career victory at the time by winning the Critérium du Dauphiné. Here he is being paced by Edvald Boasson Hagen.

Appollonio took his first victory as a professional during June's Tour de Luxembourg, winning a bunch sprint into Roost. A fifth-place finish the following day, on the final stage, ensured that Appollonio won the points classification, taking the jersey from Team Katusha rider Denis Galimzyanov. Consistent finishing from Wiggins at the Critérium du Dauphiné earned the team their first overall race win at World Tour level. After finishing third in the opening prologue, Wiggins placed second behind Tony Martin (HTC–Highroad) on the third stage time trial, held over the course that would later be used for the penultimate day time-trial of the Tour de France, to take the overall lead by over a minute from nearest challenger, BMC Racing Team's Cadel Evans. Wiggins took sixth-place finishes on stages 5 and 6, and with a tenth place on the final stage, secured the overall win by 86 seconds ahead of Evans. Boasson Hagen also added World Tour points with third behind Wiggins in the time trial, and second to HTC–Highroad rider John Degenkolb on stage 4.

Kennaugh added a third place overall finish a few days later, at the Route du Sud. In July's Tour of Austria, Sutton placed second to Team RadioShack's Robert Hunter on the opening stage. Stannard sprinted to his first professional victory in stage 5, beating out his other four breakaway companions. Possoni took two seventh places during the race, and eventually finished in that position overall. Gerrans performed strongly in the Danmark Rundt in August, finishing second to Leopard Trek rider Jakob Fuglsang on the third stage. Gerrans maintained his advantage until the end of the race, eventually winning by nine seconds over Fuglsang's team-mate Daniele Bennati, while the squad won the teams classification.

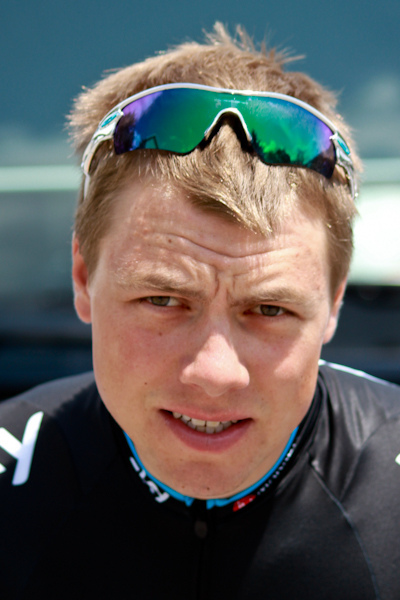
Edvald Boasson Hagen, pictured at the Critérium du Dauphiné, claimed his second Eneco Tour victory in three years, in 2011.

The Eneco Tour later in August also resulted in success for the team. Boasson Hagen finished the opening prologue stage in second place, with only BMC Racing Team rider Taylor Phinney getting the better of him over the 5.7 kilometres (3.5 mi) course. Boasson Hagen finished the next two stages in sixth and third places respectively, but could not close on Phinney, as he himself finished in the top ten – within the main field sprint – on both occasions. Two ninth-place finishes followed, the second of which coming during the time trial stage in Roermond to help him overhaul Philippe Gilbert for the race lead, with two stages remaining. Boasson Hagen held the lead to the end of the race, and won the final stage of the event in Sittard, to take a 22-second victory over Gilbert. He also played a prominent part in the other classifications, as his six top-ten placings over the week earned him victory in the points classification, while his overall triumph also meant victory in the young rider classification. The squad provisionally won the teams classification on-the-road, but an eventual protest from Team RadioShack general manager Dirk Demol, resulted in RadioShack winning the classification on time trial timings.

In the Tour du Poitou-Charentes, the week following the Eneco Tour, Appollonio earned his second victory in a first stage sprint finish; with the team having upped the pace during the closing stages, Dowsett, Kennaugh – who had been in a breakaway earlier in the day – and Henderson enabled Appollonio to contend for the sprint, winning by a comfortable margin, with only eleven other riders finishing in the same time. The team book-ended the race as Dowsett earned the victory in the final stage of the race, soloing away from the peloton with 3 kilometres (1.9 mi) remaining. Appollonio completed a 1–2 on the stage by taking the field sprint for second place. The Tour of Britain in September, resulted in a stage win and two minor classification victories for the team. Dowsett claimed victory in the time trial held on the morning of the final day, while Thomas won the points classification, taking the lead on the finish line, after six top-ten placings out of the eight stages enabled to usurp the total of general classification winner Lars Boom (Rabobank), for an eventual three-point winning margin over HTC–Highroad's Mark Cavendish. The squad also triumphed by over 90 seconds in the teams classification. Sutton claimed the team's final stage win of the season with victory in stage two of the Tour de Wallonie-Picarde. He finished second to Skil–Shimano rider Tom Veelers the next day, before the squad ultimately won the teams classification.

The team also won lesser classifications at the Bay Classic Series, the Tour of Oman, and the Tour of Beijing. The team also sent squads to the Tour of Qatar, the Tour Méditerranéen, the Vuelta a Andalucía, the Vuelta a Murcia, Tirreno–Adriatico, Volta a Catalunya, the Critérium International, the Three Days of De Panne, the Tour of the Basque Country, the Tour de Picardie, the Tour de Suisse, the Ster ZLM Toer, the Brixia Tour, the Tour de Wallonie and the Tour de Pologne, but did not achieve a stage win, classification win, or podium finish in any of them.

== Grand Tours ==
=== Giro d'Italia ===
Löfkvist was named as the team's leader for the race, having previously held the lead of the race in 2009. Barry, Carlström, Cioni, Nordhaug and Possoni were named to the team in order to support Löfkvist in the mountain stages, while the remaining three members of the squad – Appollonio, Downing and Kennaugh – were named to provide the main threats in the stages designed for the sprinters. The team's showing in the stage 1 team time trial was average, as they came home ninth of the 23 teams, 37 seconds off the winning pace set by HTC–Highroad. Appollonio finished near the front of the field in the Giro's first road stage, taking sixth in the mass sprint finish to the second stage, in Parma, before bettering that several days later, with a fifth place on the sixth stage into Fiuggi. Another sixth place followed for Appollonio on stage 8, thanks to build-up work from Carlström, Barry and Downing, before a fourth top-ten finish – his second fifth place of the race – after the rest day, on stage ten to Teramo.

As the race moved into its second half, Appollonio continued his impressive form, taking second place on stage 12, with only Mark Cavendish getting the better of him by around three-quarters of a bike length; the result moved him into the top five of the points classification. It would be his last stage finish of the race, as he abandoned the next day, unlike some of the other sprinters, who did not take to the stage. Downing, on his Grand Tour début, placed eighth on stage 18, as a result of a split in the main field, which allowed no fewer than 20 riders to make headway, all of whom posing no major threat in the general classification. Despite not finishing in the top ten of any stage, Löfkvist finished as the best-placed rider in the team, finishing 21st overall, nearly 44 minutes down on Saxo Bank–SunGard rider Alberto Contador, the race winner.

=== Tour de France ===
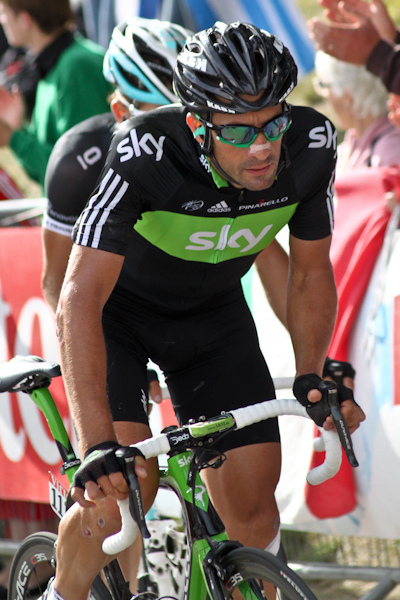
Juan Antonio Flecha, during stage 19, wearing the team's special kit for the race. Flecha also made headlines when he and Vacansoleil–DCM's Johnny Hoogerland were sideswiped by a France Télévisions car during an overtaking manoeuvre, while they rode in a breakaway.

The team helped to raise awareness and support for the Sky Rainforest Rescue, a three-year partnership between Sky and the World Wide Fund for Nature to help save a billion trees in the state of Acre in northwest Brazil. As such, instead of their normal team kit of black with blue trim, the squad wore black with green trim, for the duration of the race. Following on from a 24th-place finish in 2010, Wiggins was the team's leader for the race, with Swift, Thomas, Boasson Hagen, Urán, Flecha, Zandio, Knees and Gerrans making up the nine-man outfit. Thomas assumed the lead of the young rider classification, after finishing sixth in the opening stage to Mont des Alouettes, after Boasson Hagen had tried to track down the eventual stage winner Philippe Gilbert. The squad set the third-fastest time in the stage 2 team time trial; having set the quickest time at the first intermediate sprint – by one second ahead of Garmin–Cervélo – the team were eventually beaten by Garmin–Cervélo and BMC Racing Team, but the performance was good enough to move Thomas into fourth place overall and Boasson Hagen into eighth place.

Urán placed fourth on the fourth stage, finishing with many of the overall contenders for the race, on the steep uphill finish to Mûr-de-Bretagne. Wiggins became the team's best placed rider, moving into sixth place despite losing time to the top ten on the stage – a result that left him pleased at the end of the stage – and Thomas and Boasson Hagen also remained in the top ten, in seventh and eighth respectively. Boasson Hagen tried to make a solo bid for victory the next day, within the closing stages, but could not hold the pace, and was usurped by the field. Thomas placed fifth on the stage, aiding eventual stage winner Mark Cavendish's progress, as he maintained his lead in the young rider classification. Boasson Hagen earned the team's first Tour win on the sixth stage into Lisieux. Having held their attack until the time was right, Swift and Thomas formed the lead-out for Boasson Hagen to win the longest stage of the 2011 race.

Wiggins' Tour ended on stage 7, after a large crash in the main field with 40 kilometres (24.9 mi) remaining on the stage; Wiggins was one of many riders to hit the ground, and after getting back to his feet, he was seen to be holding his left arm, and was eventually diagnosed with a broken collarbone. All the team's remaining riders lost three minutes to the majority of the field, with Thomas losing the young rider classification lead to Rabobank rider Robert Gesink as a result. Flecha attacked the peloton 25 kilometres (15.5 mi) from the end of stage 8 with Astana's Alexander Vinokourov, to chase after several riders further down the road, but Vinokourov dropped Flecha prior to the final climb to Super Besse. Flecha made another break from the peloton on the ninth stage, as he was joined by five other riders who extended their lead over the field. With 36 km (22.4 mi) remaining, Flecha and fellow escapee Johnny Hoogerland of Vacansoleil–DCM were involved in a dramatic crash; while attempting to overtake the riders, a support car from France Télévisions sideswiped Flecha, and as a result, caused Hoogerland to crash into a barbed wire fence, and Flecha also fell to the ground. Flecha suffered whiplash, as well as cuts and lacerations to his knee, but was fit enough to continue in the race after the rest day.

Thomas and Boasson Hagen each placed in the top ten again before the first half of the race drew to a close. Thomas later made the breakaway on stage 12, and was out front for the entire day until part-way up the final climb to Luz Ardiden, when he and companion Jérémy Roy (FDJ) were caught with 8 kilometres (5.0 mi) remaining by Jelle Vanendert (Omega Pharma–Lotto) and Euskaltel–Euskadi's Samuel Sánchez; the latter pair eventually went on to finish in first and second on the stage. Thomas was later awarded the most aggressive rider prize for the day. The following day, Boasson Hagen also made into the breakaway, eventually finishing in sixth place on the stage, after three riders escaped from the front, but stayed clear of the main field. Urán finished fifth on stage 14, finishing at Plateau de Beille, and as a result, earned the lead of the young riders classification, from FDJ's Arnold Jeannesson.

Swift finished sixth on stage 15, before Boasson Hagen finished second to fellow Norwegian Thor Hushovd on stage 16, after both riders were part of a group that got clear of the field with 60 kilometres (37.3 mi) left; Urán moved into the top ten overall at the expense of Quick-Step rider Kevin De Weert. Boasson Hagen went one place better the following day, taking his second victory of the Tour on stage 17, as the race ventured into Italy and the stage finish in Pinerolo. After being part of a 14-man breakaway, Boasson Hagen led over the final mountain, the Colle Pra Martino, and retained his lead on the descent to win the stage by 40 seconds. Urán surrendered the young rider lead on stage 18, after losing over seven minutes to stage winner Andy Schleck (Leopard Trek), and lost the lead to Cofidis rider Rein Taaramäe. Swift tried to force himself into a victory on the Champs-Élysées, but was caught with 3 kilometres (1.9 mi) remaining, but Boasson Hagen again finished second on the line, to Cavendish, as he finished sixth in the final points classification. Urán finished the Tour as the team's best placed rider, nearly 43 minutes down in 24th place.

=== Vuelta a España ===
Having recovered from his injuries suffered in the Tour de France, Wiggins was the team's leader at the Vuelta, competing in the race for the first time. Wiggins was joined in the race by Arvesen, Cioni, Zandio, Possoni and Löfkvist, who were named to the team in order to support Wiggins in the mountain stages; Froome was named on the team for mountain assistance, and for his time-trial skills, with Stannard and Sutton mainly contesting the sprint stages. In the opening stage team time trial, the squad finished 20th of 22, after a number of events left the team at one point with four riders, with a team's time recorded when a fifth rider passes the finish line. Zandio recovered to join his four team-mates out front, limiting any further time loss. The following day, in the Vuelta's first road stage, Sutton earned the victory in a disjointed mass sprint finish to the second stage, in Orihuela; he and Vicente Reynès of Omega Pharma–Lotto gained a gap on the field and they stayed clear until the finish with Sutton outsprinting Reynès for his first Grand Tour victory.

With Froome and Löfkvist protecting Wiggins and any potential time losses during the early mountain stages, Arvesen was involved in his second crash of the race – having also crashed during the team time trial – on stage 5, in which he hit a young spectator at 70 km/h (43 mph). He completed that day's stage, but abandoned the race the following day due to injuries suffered in the crash, which included bruises and lacerations, as well as a knee complaint. Froome and Wiggins both gave away some time over the rest of the week, and they trailed Joaquim Rodríguez (Team Katusha) by nearly two minutes at the conclusion of the eighth stage. The next day, Froome and Wiggins made it into the front group on the climb to La Covatilla, and with Wiggins pushing the pace on the front of the group, the number of riders that were in contention for the stage victory dwindled. Ultimately, Wiggins and Froome finished fourth and fifth on the stage, but moved up to 13th and 14th in the general classification, just a minute behind new race leader, Rabobank's Bauke Mollema.

In the race's only individual time trial, held the next day, it was Froome rather than Wiggins that performed best for the team, as he finished second to Tony Martin (HTC–Highroad) on the stage and moved into the lead of the race by 12 seconds ahead of Leopard Trek rider Jakob Fuglsang. Wiggins himself finished third on the stage, having at one point set the quickest intermediate split on the course, but moved into the same position overall, 20 seconds behind Froome. After the race's first rest day, Wiggins assumed the race lead at its halfway point, as he responded to several late-race attacks to the finish at Manzaneda, while Froome could not, and eventually lost 27 seconds to his team-mate, giving Wiggins the lead by seven. Wiggins and Froome again finished together on stage 14, as they put more time into several of their rivals, including Rodríguez and Liquigas–Cannondale's Vincenzo Nibali, the defending champion.

The race changed again as it went into its final week, with the 15th stage – the queen stage of the Vuelta – to the Angliru, with an average gradient of 10% and a maximum gradient of over 23% at the Cueña les Cabres section of the climb. Geox–TMC rider Juan José Cobo broke free of the group that had been controlled by Froome and Wiggins, with 6 kilometres (3.7 mi) remaining on the stage, and eventually soloed to victory, and assumed the overall race lead from Wiggins. Wiggins himself struggled on the climb, and eventually cracked later on the climb, losing a total of 81 seconds to Cobo, while Froome stayed with a select group of riders, finishing in fourth place on the stage, 48 seconds down on Cobo and in the same time as Vacansoleil–DCM rider Wout Poels and Cobo's team-mate Denis Menchov. Froome and Wiggins gave up several more seconds on stage 16, after a split in the field on the run-in to the finish in Haro; Cobo extended his lead to 22 seconds over Froome and 51 seconds over Wiggins. The following day was the last real summit finish of the race, the climb to Peña Cabarga, at an altitude of 565 metres (1,854 ft).

Froome shadowed Cobo on the slopes of the climb, and it was not until the final 1.5 kilometres (0.9 mi) that Froome and Cobo pulled clear of the remaining riders of their group, including Wiggins, after pulling back Omega Pharma–Lotto's Jurgen Van den Broeck. After the duo had pulled clear, Froome attacked Cobo and looked to have gained enough of an advantage to make his way back into the lead of the race, but Cobo bridged back to Froome with around 150 metres (490 ft) left. Cobo kicked for the line from there, but Froome took the inside line on the final corner and won the stage, but could only gain nine seconds – one second on the road plus eight bonus seconds on the line – on Cobo, to reduce his advantage to 13 seconds. Froome's victory was the first mountain-top stage win by a British rider in a Grand Tour since Robert Millar at the 1989 Tour de France.

Wiggins finished twelfth on the stage, 39 seconds down on Froome, which meant that he trailed Cobo by over 90 seconds, which effectively ended his chances of winning the race. Froome tried to make his move in the Basque Country on stage 19, but was well guarded by Cobo, and no time gains were made. Froome made a decisive error in the penultimate stage, misjudging an intermediate sprint banner, and as a result went for the points and elusive bonus seconds 4 kilometres (2.5 mi) too soon, and as a result, could not affect Cobo's 13-second lead prior to the final stage. Cobo secured victory at the end of the final stage, a processional affair until hitting the streets of Madrid, with Froome finishing just in front on the stage results. Cobo's winning margin of 13 seconds over Froome was tied for the third-closest in Vuelta history, while Wiggins completed the podium in third place, 1' 39" down on Cobo.

On 12 June 2019, the UCI released a statement that Cobo was found guilty of an anti-doping rule violation when abnormalities related to the use of performance-enhancing drugs were found on his biological passport and was stripped of the title several days later along with his results during a time period between 2009 and 2011, also receiving a three-year ban. On 17 July 2019, nearly eight years since the race ended, the UCI formally awarded the title to Froome, now recognizing him as the first British rider to win any of the Grand Tours. This result also elevated Wiggins into second place.

== Season victories ==
Date	Race	Competition	Rider	Country	Location
January 5	Bay Classic Series, Sprints classification	National event	Simon Gerrans (AUS)	Australia	
January 19	Tour Down Under, Stage 2	UCI World Tour	Ben Swift (GBR)	Australia	Mannum
January 23	Tour Down Under, Stage 6	UCI World Tour	Ben Swift (GBR)	Australia	Adelaide
February 18	Volta ao Algarve, Stage 3	UCI Europe Tour	Steve Cummings (GBR)	Portugal	Malhão
February 20	Tour of Oman, Points classification	UCI Asia Tour	Edvald Boasson Hagen (NOR)	Oman	
February 27	Kuurne–Brussels–Kuurne	UCI Europe Tour	Christopher Sutton (AUS)	Belgium	Kuurne
March 7	Paris–Nice, Stage 2	UCI World Tour	Greg Henderson (NZL)	France	Amilly
April 17	Vuelta a Castilla y León, Stage 5	UCI Europe Tour	Ben Swift (GBR)	Spain	Medina del Campo
May 1	Tour de Romandie, Stage 5	UCI World Tour	Ben Swift (GBR)	Switzerland	Geneva
May 16	Tour of California, Stage 2	UCI America Tour	Ben Swift (GBR)	United States	Sacramento
May 17	Tour of California, Stage 3	UCI America Tour	Greg Henderson (NZL)	United States	Modesto
May 25	Bayern-Rundfahrt, Stage 1	UCI Europe Tour	Edvald Boasson Hagen (NOR)	Germany	Freystadt
May 28	Bayern-Rundfahrt, Stage 4	UCI Europe Tour	Bradley Wiggins (GBR)	Germany	Friedberg
May 29	Bayern-Rundfahrt, Overall	UCI Europe Tour	Geraint Thomas (GBR)	Germany	
May 29	Bayern-Rundfahrt, Sprints classification	UCI Europe Tour	Edvald Boasson Hagen (NOR)	Germany	
May 29	Bayern-Rundfahrt, Teams classification	UCI Europe Tour	(Note: The riders on the squad were Edvald Boasson Hagen, Simon Gerrans, Christian Knees, Christopher Sutton, Geraint Thomas, Bradley Wiggins, and Michael Rogers)	Germany	
June 4	Tour de Luxembourg, Stage 3	UCI Europe Tour	Davide Appollonio (ITA)	Luxembourg	Roost
June 5	Tour de Luxembourg, Points classification	UCI Europe Tour	Davide Appollonio (ITA)	Luxembourg	
June 12	Critérium du Dauphiné, Overall	UCI World Tour	Bradley Wiggins (GBR)	France	
July 7	Tour de France, Stage 6	UCI World Tour	Edvald Boasson Hagen (NOR)	France	Lisieux
July 7	Tour of Austria, Stage 5	UCI Europe Tour	Ian Stannard (GBR)	Austria	Alpendorf-Schladming
July 20	Tour de France, Stage 17	UCI World Tour	Edvald Boasson Hagen (NOR)	Italy	Pinerolo
August 7	Danmark Rundt, Overall	UCI Europe Tour	Simon Gerrans (AUS)	Denmark	
August 7	Danmark Rundt, Teams classification	UCI Europe Tour	(Note: The riders on the squad were Davide Appollonio, Kurt Asle Arvesen, Dario Cioni, Russell Downing, Alex Dowsett, Simon Gerrans, Jeremy Hunt and Christopher Sutton)	Denmark	
August 14	Eneco Tour, Stage 6	UCI World Tour	Edvald Boasson Hagen (NOR)	Netherlands	Sittard-Geleen
August 14	Eneco Tour, Overall	UCI World Tour	Edvald Boasson Hagen (NOR)	(Note: Race held in Belgium and the Netherlands.)	
August 14	Eneco Tour, Points classification	UCI World Tour	Edvald Boasson Hagen (NOR)		
August 14	Eneco Tour, Young rider classification	UCI World Tour	Edvald Boasson Hagen (NOR)		
August 21	Vattenfall Cyclassics	UCI World Tour	Edvald Boasson Hagen (NOR)	Germany	Hamburg
August 21	Vuelta a España, Stage 2	UCI World Tour	Christopher Sutton (AUS)	Spain	Orihuela
August 23	Tour du Poitou-Charentes, Stage 1	UCI Europe Tour	Davide Appollonio (ITA)	France	Cognac
August 26	Tour du Poitou-Charentes, Stage 5	UCI Europe Tour	Alex Dowsett (GBR)	France	Poitiers
September 7	Vuelta a España, Stage 17	UCI World Tour	Chris Froome (GBR)	Spain	Peña Cabarga
September 11	Vuelta a España, Overall	UCI World Tour	Chris Froome (GBR)	Spain	
September 11	Vuelta a España, Combination category	UCI World Tour	Chris Froome (GBR)	Spain	
September 18	Tour of Britain, Stage 8a	UCI Europe Tour	Alex Dowsett (GBR)	Great Britain	London
September 18	Tour of Britain, Points classification	UCI Europe Tour	Geraint Thomas (GBR)	Great Britain	
September 18	Tour of Britain, Teams classification	UCI Europe Tour	(Note: The riders on the squad were Geraint Thomas, Ben Swift, Mathew Hayman, Alex Dowsett, Michael Rogers and Steve Cummings)	Great Britain	
September 30	Tour de Wallonie-Picarde, Stage 2	UCI Europe Tour	Christopher Sutton (AUS)	Belgium	Poperinge
October 2	Tour de Wallonie-Picarde, Teams classification	UCI Europe Tour	(Note: The riders on the squad were Juan Antonio Flecha, Mathew Hayman, Russell Downing, Kjell Carlström, Greg Henderson, Michael Rogers, Ian Stannard and Christopher Sutton)	(Note: Race held in Belgium and France.)	
October 6	Paris–Bourges	UCI Europe Tour	Mathew Hayman (AUS)	France	Bourges
October 9	Tour of Beijing, Teams classification	UCI World Tour	(Note: The riders on the squad were Chris Froome, Davide Appollonio, Michael Barry, Dario Cioni, Steve Cummings, Alex Dowsett, Jeremy Hunt and Christian Knees)	China	
