= Scheldeprijs =

One-day road cycling race

Race details
- Date: Mid April
- Region: Antwerp, Belgium
- English name: Grand Prize of the Scheldt
- Local name: Scheldeprijs (in Dutch)
- Discipline: Road race
- Competition: UCI ProSeries; UCI Women's ProSeries
- Type: Single-day
- Web site: www.scheldeprijs.be

Men's history
- First edition: 1907
- Editions: 114 (as of 2026)
- First winner: Maurice Leturgie (FRA)
- Most wins: Marcel Kittel (GER) (5 wins)
- Most recent: Tim Merlier (BEL)

Women's history
- First edition: 2021
- Editions: 6 (as of 2026)
- First winner: Lorena Wiebes (NED)
- Most wins: Lorena Wiebes (NED) (4 wins)
- Most recent: Charlotte Kool (NED)

The Scheldeprijs is a cycling race in Flanders and the Netherlands which starts in Terneuzen, crosses the Scheldt River, and finishes in Schoten. Until 2018 it was held entirely in Belgium. The event, ranked as a 1.Pro race on the UCI ProSeries, features mostly sprinters on its roll of honour, as it is held on all-flat roads over roughly 200 kilometres.

First held in 1907, it is the oldest still-existing cycling event in Flanders, notably six years older than the Tour of Flanders monument race. The race had its only interruptions during both World Wars and celebrated its 100th edition in 2012. German sprinter Marcel Kittel holds the record with five wins.

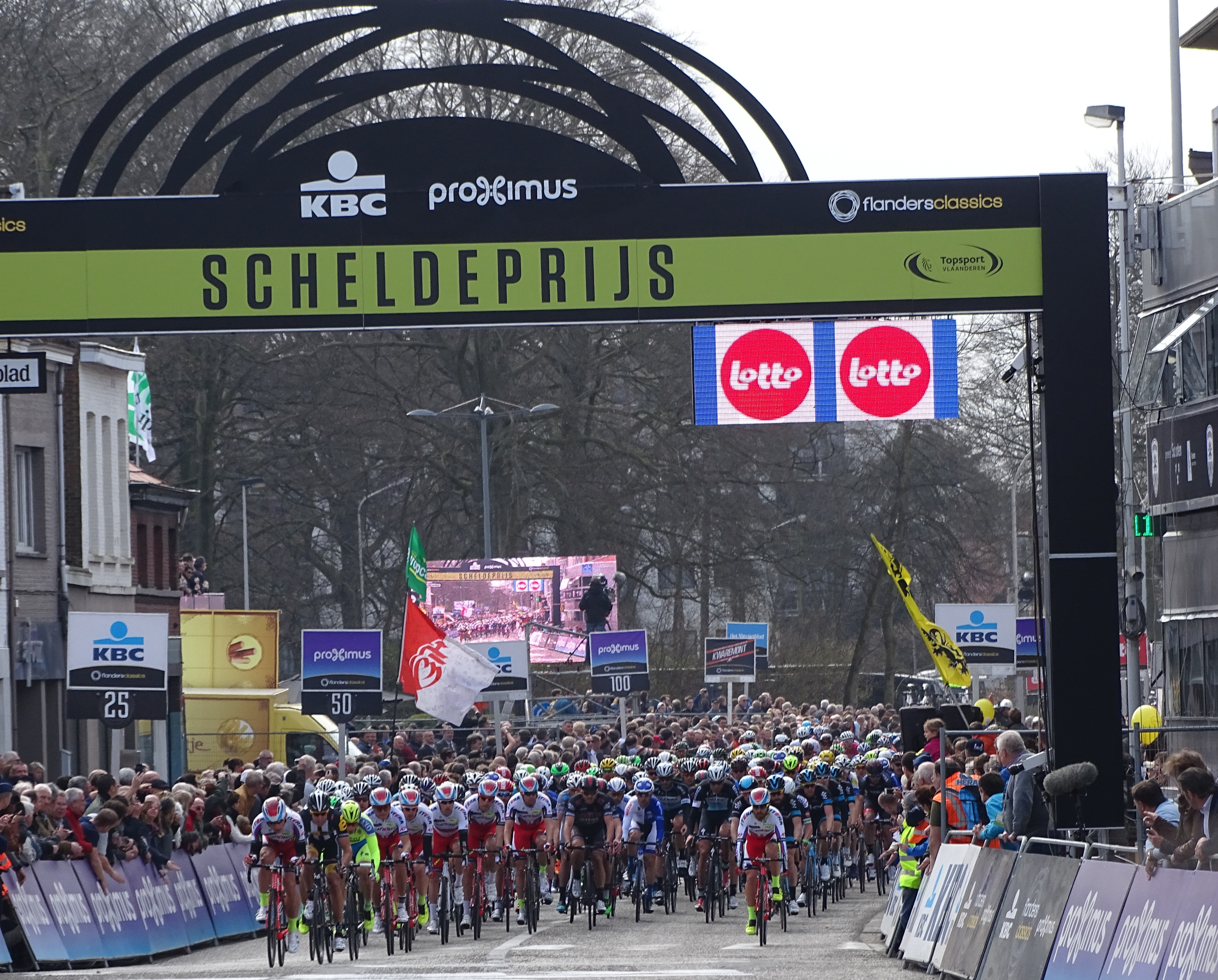
Scheldeprijs finish passage in Schoten, 8 April 2015

Since 2021, a women's edition of Scheldeprijs is held on the same day as the men's race, starting and finishing in Schoten, approximately 136 kilometres in distance.

== History ==
The first Scheldeprijs was organised by the Antwerp branch of the Belgian cycling federation (BWB) on 8 July 1907, making it the oldest cycling race in Flanders. In its early years it started and ended in Antwerp, finishing at the now demolished Zurenborg velodrome. Later the start moved to Merksem and then Deurne, on the outskirts of Antwerp. In 1996, the start moved back to the centre of Antwerp. The inaugural race in 1907 was won by Frenchman Maurice Léturgie. It would be 46 years before another non-Belgian – Dutchman Hans Dekkers – triumphed in 1953.

From the 1980s until 2009, the race was held in mid-April on the Wednesday following Paris–Roubaix. In 2010, when the Scheldeprijs was purchased by Flanders Classics, the event swapped dates with Gent–Wevelgem and has since been held on the Wednesday between the Tour of Flanders and Paris–Roubaix. It has formerly been known as Scheldeprijs Schoten and Scheldeprijs Vlaanderen. (Note: Until the 1990s, English language sources tended to refer to the race by the French translation of its name (Grand Prix de l'Escaut), even though the race has always been held wholly within Dutch-speaking territory.) Since 2010, the race is simply known as Scheldeprijs.

Prominent winners include Eddy Merckx, Rik Van Looy, Mario Cipollini, Freddy Maertens, Roger De Vlaeminck, Erik Zabel, Briek Schotte, Stan Ockers, Georges Ronsse, Mark Cavendish, and Tom Boonen. German sprinter Marcel Kittel holds the record for most wins with five victories between 2012 and 2017. Belgian classics specialist Johan Museeuw, who finished second in 1992 and 1997, chose the 2004 event as his final race, saying, "I could have retired after Paris–Roubaix but I felt it important that my last race should be in Belgium. The Scheldeprijs is a great race and I especially love the start on Antwerp's market place."

=== Women's race ===
Since 2021, a women's edition of Scheldeprijs is held on the same day as the men's race, starting and finishing in Schoten, approximately 136 kilometres in distance. Lorena Wiebes won the inaugural edition. In 2026, the race joined the UCI ProSeries.

== Route ==
The current route, starting with the 2018 edition, rolls out from Terneuzen, then passes through the Western Scheldt Tunnel before racing starts near Ellewoutsdijk. It takes a 129.8 kilometre tour of the islands of Walcheren, North and South Beveland in the province of Zeeland in the Netherlands before crossing the border into Belgium, taking three laps on a local circuit and finishing at Churchilllaan in Schoten.

The previous racecourse consisted of one 155 kilometres lap in the countryside of Antwerp province followed by three smaller laps of 15 kilometres in and around Schoten. That route included seven cobbled sections varying between 1300 and 3000 metres. The race had a neutralised start on the banks of the River Schelde in the centre of Antwerp at the Grote Markt outside the City Hall. Racing begins in Schoten, a few kilometres northeast. The finish was outside Schoten town hall.

Due to the COVID-19 pandemic, the 2020 edition was postponed from the spring to 14 October, and a revised route of 10 laps around Schoten planned, remaining entirely in Belgian territory.

== Men's winners ==
The following cyclists have won the race:

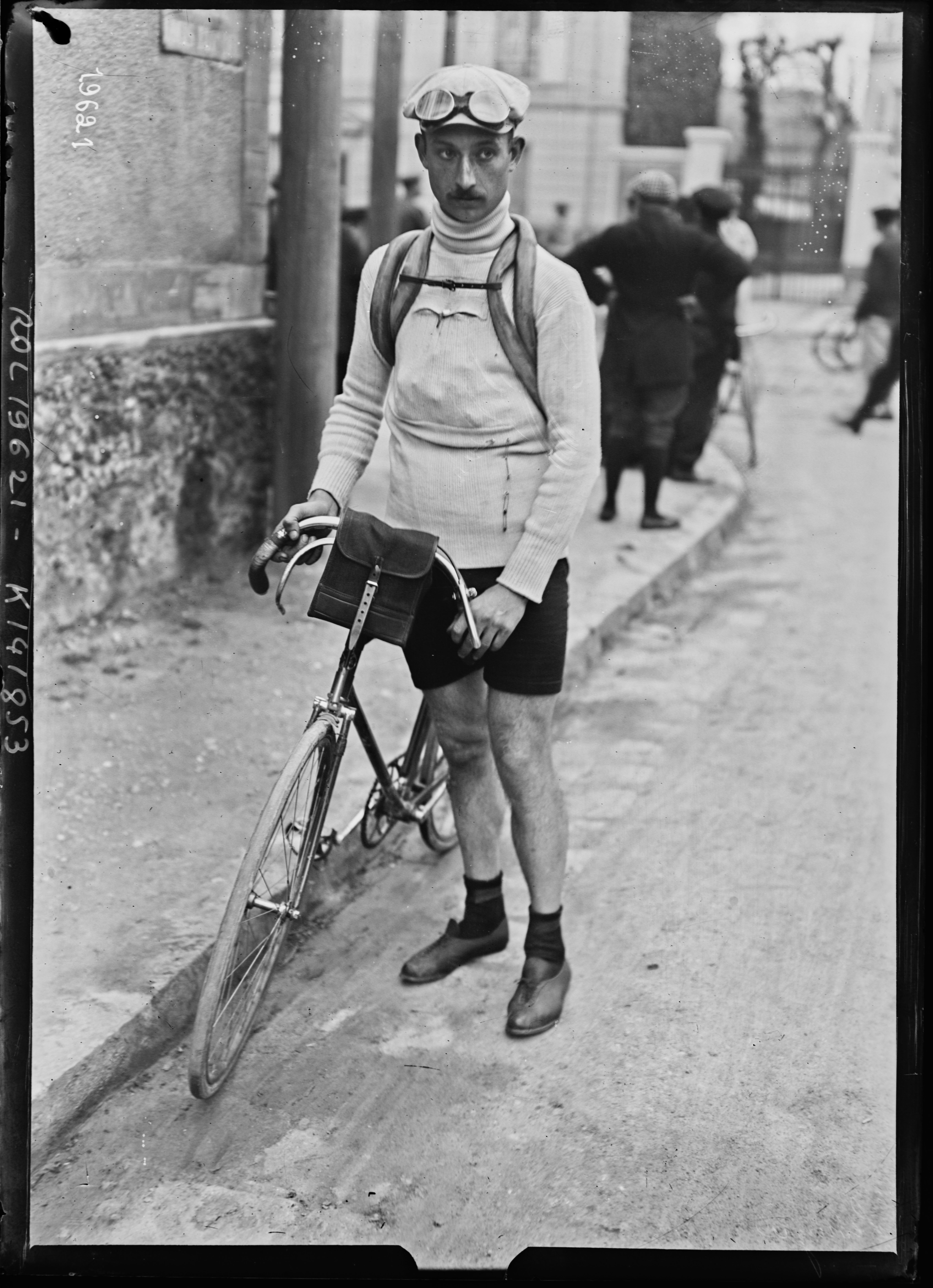
Frenchman Maurice Léturgie won the inaugural Scheldeprijs in 1907.

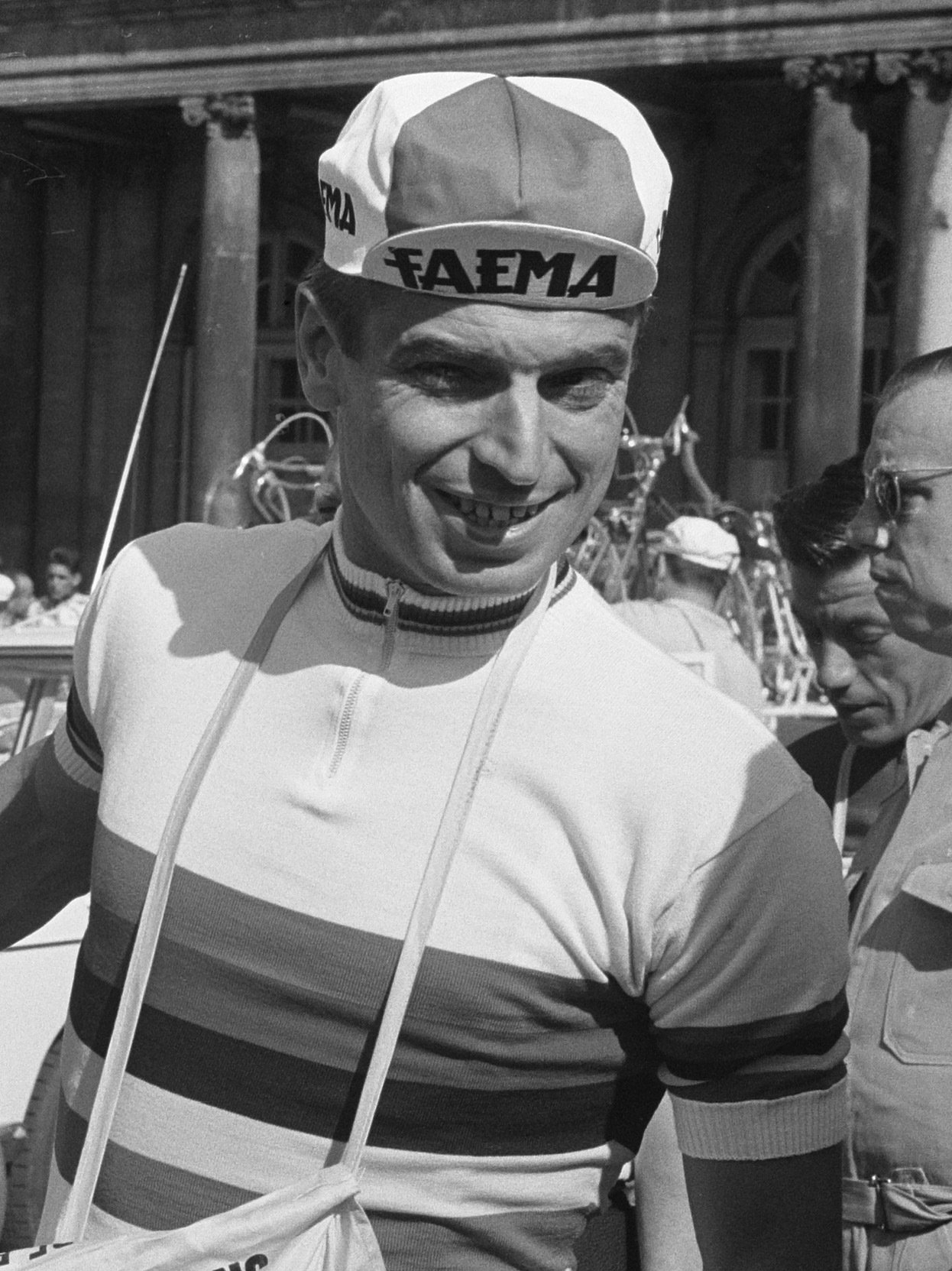
Local cycling icon Rik Van Looy (pictured in the rainbow jersey) won the race twice in the 1950s.

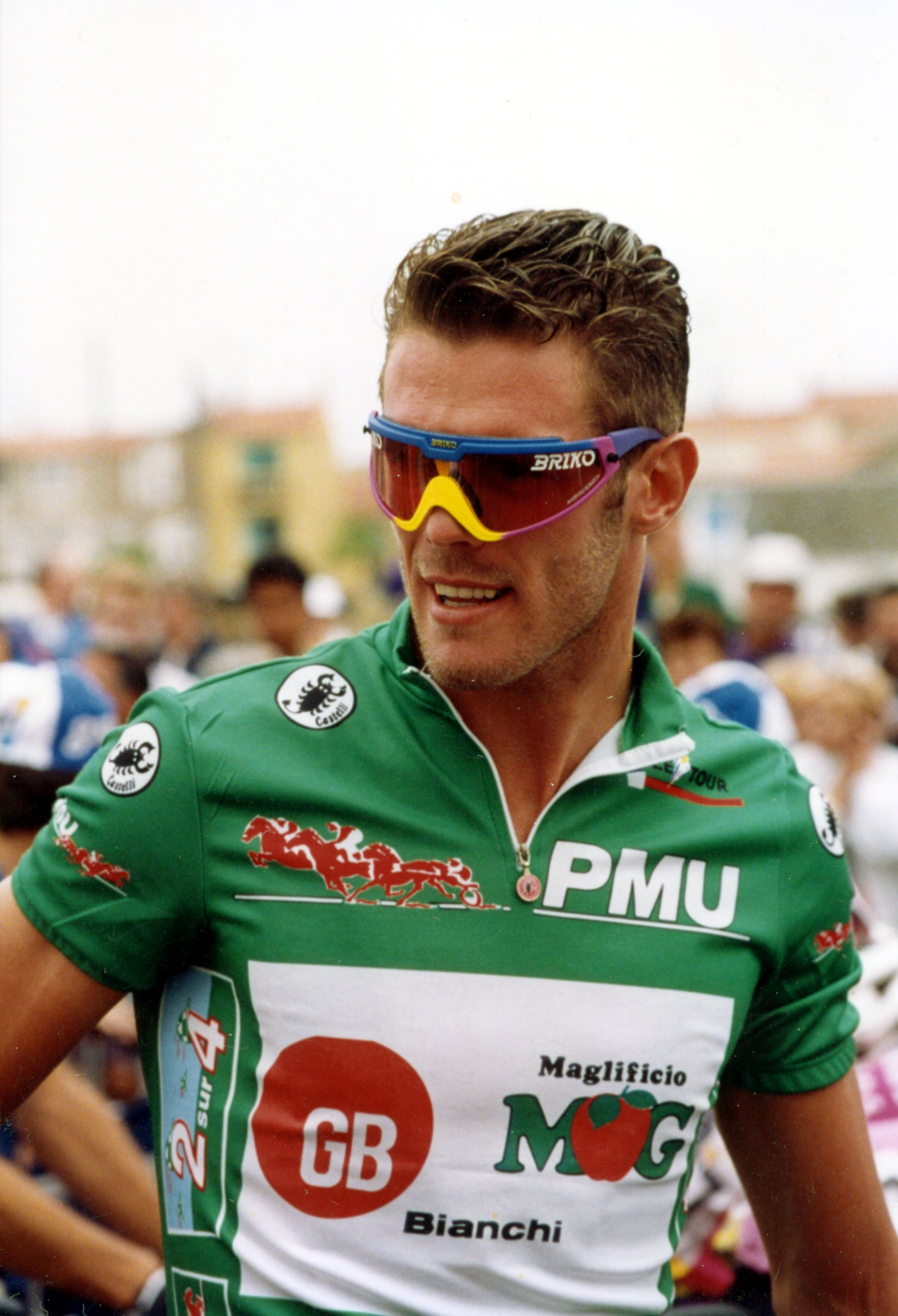
Italian sprinter Mario Cipollini claimed two Scheldeprijs wins in the 1990s.

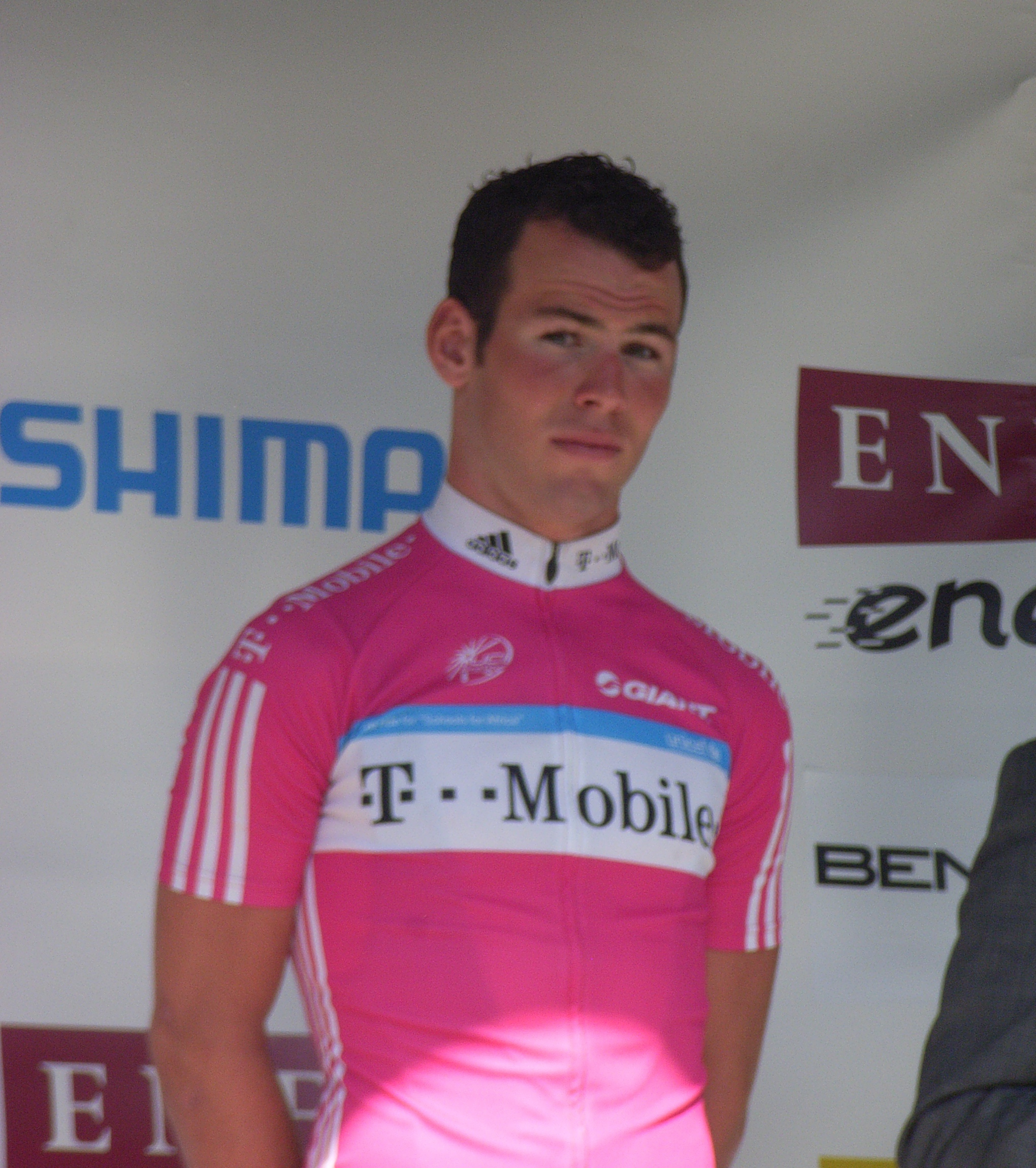
Mark Cavendish had his breakthrough win at the 2007 Scheldeprijs, on the T-Mobile Team, and secured two further victories in later years.

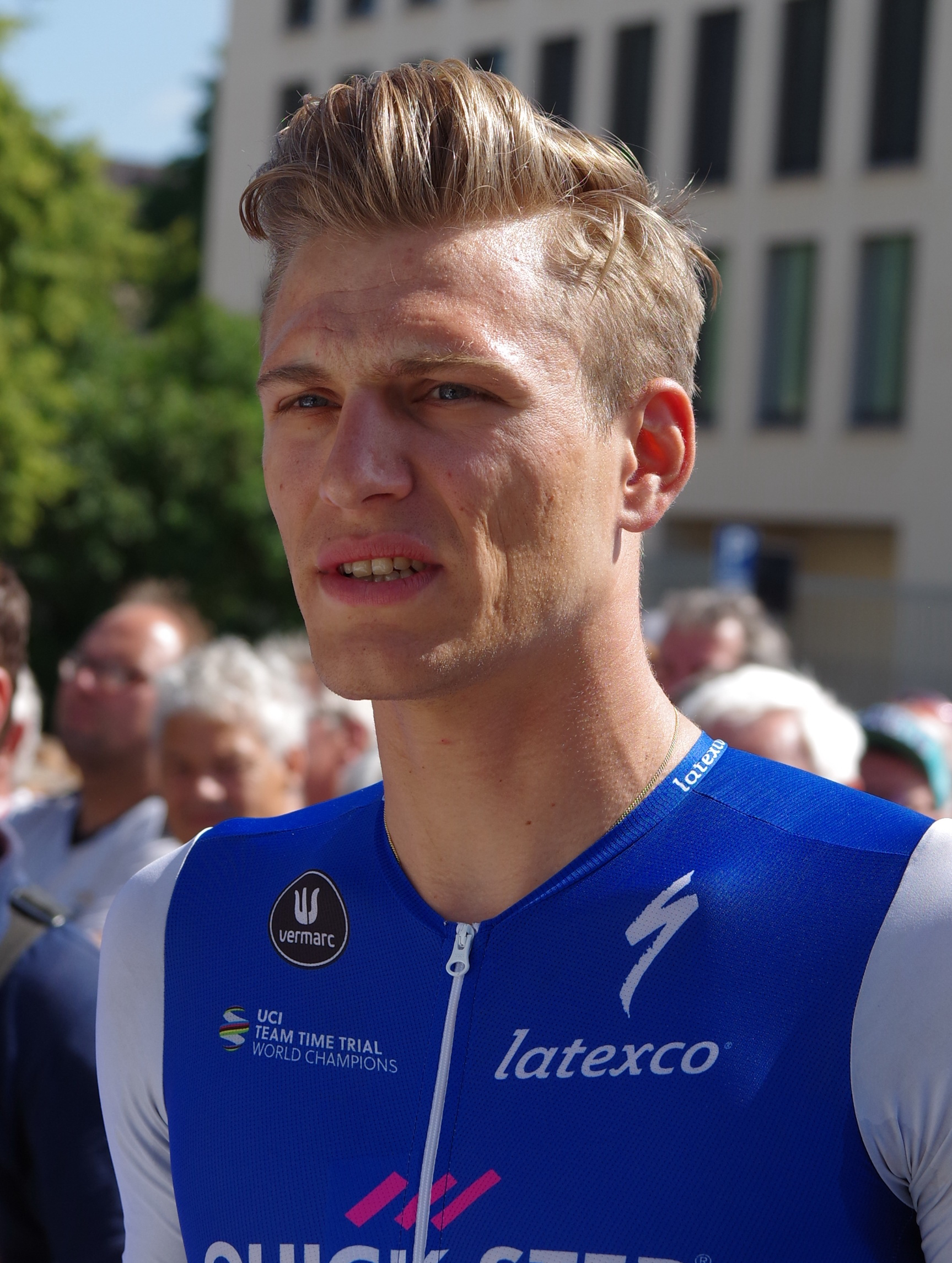
German sprinter Marcel Kittel holds the record with five wins between 2012 and 2017.

Year	Country	Rider	Team
1907	France	Maurice Leturgie	
1908	Belgium	Adrien Kranskens	
1909	Belgium	Raymond Van Parijs	
1910	Belgium	Florent Luyckx	
1911	Belgium	Florent Luyckx	
1912	Belgium	Joseph Van Wetter	
1913	Belgium	Joseph Van Wetter	
1914	Belgium	Octave Jacques	
1915- 1918	No race		
1919	Belgium	Isidoor Mechant	
1920	Belgium	Victor Lenaers	
1921	Belgium	René Vermandel	
1922	Belgium	Florent Vandenbergh	
1923	Belgium	Emile Thollembeek	
1924	Belgium	René Vermandel	Alcyon
1925	Belgium	Karel Van Hassel	
1926	Belgium	Jef Dervaes	Labor–Dunlop
1927	Belgium	Georges Ronsse	
1928	Belgium	Jef Dervaes	
1929	Belgium	Joseph Wauters	
1930	Belgium	Denis Verschueren	
1931	Belgium	Godefried Devoght	
1932	Belgium	Godefried Devoght	
1933	Belgium	Jan-Jozef Horemans	
1934	Belgium	Léon Tommies	Alcyon
1935	Belgium	Gerard Loncke	
1936	Belgium	Marcel Van Schil	
1937	Belgium	Sylvain Grysolle	
1938	Belgium	Antoine Dignef	
1939	Belgium	Achiel Buysse	
1940	No race		
1941	Belgium	Stan Ockers	
1942	Belgium	Lode Busschops	
1943	Belgium	Éloi Meulenberg	
1944	No race		
1945	No race		
1946	Belgium	Stan Ockers	Metropole–Dunlop
1947	Belgium	René Mertens	
1948	Belgium	Achiel Buysse	
1949	Belgium	Roger Decorte	
1950	Belgium	André Pieters	Ryssel–Wolber
1951	Belgium	Ernest Sterckx	
1952	Belgium	Roger Decorte	Alcyon
1953	Netherlands	Hans Dekkers	
1954	Belgium	Roger Decock	
1955	Belgium	Briek Schotte	Alcyon
1956	Belgium	Rik Van Looy	Faema–Guerra
1957	Belgium	Rik Van Looy	Faema–Guerra
1958	Belgium	Raymond Vrancken	
1959	Belgium	Willy Butzen	
1960	Belgium	Piet Oellibrandt	Dr. Mann–Dossche Sport
1961	Belgium	Raymond Vrancken	
1962	Belgium	Piet Oellibrandt	Theugels–Robur
1963	Belgium	Piet Oellibrandt	Dr. Mann
1964	Belgium	Jos Hoevenaers	
1965	Belgium	Willy Vannitsen	
1966	Belgium	Joseph Spruyt	
1967	Belgium	Paul In 't Ven	
1968	Belgium	Edward Sels	Bic
1969	Belgium	Walter Godefroot	Flandria–De Clerck–Krüger
1970	Belgium	Roger De Vlaeminck	Flandria–Mars
1971	Belgium	Gustaaf Van Roosbroeck	Watney–Avia
1972	Belgium	Eddy Merckx	Molteni
1973	Belgium	Freddy Maertens	Flandria–Carpenter–Shimano
1974	Belgium	Marc Demeyer	Carpenter–Confortluxe–Flandria
1975	Belgium	Ronald De Witte	Carpenter–Confortluxe–Flandria
1976	Belgium	Frans Verbeeck	IJsboerke–Colnago
1977	Belgium	Marc Demeyer	Flandria–Velda–Latina Assicurazioni
1978	West Germany	Dietrich Thurau	IJsboerke–Gios
1979	Belgium	Daniel Willems	IJsboerke–Warncke
1980	Belgium	Ludo Peeters	IJsboerke–Warncke
1981	Netherlands	Ad Wijnands	TI–Raleigh–Creda
1982	Belgium	Ludo Schurgers	Masta–Puch
1983	Belgium	Jan Bogaert	Europ Decor–Dries
1984	Belgium	Ludo Peeters	Kwantum–Decosol–Yoko
1985	Netherlands	Adri van der Poel	Kwantum–Decosol–Yoko
1986	Netherlands	Jean-Paul van Poppel	Skala-Skil
1987	Belgium	Etienne De Wilde	Sigma
1988	Netherlands	Jean-Paul van Poppel	Superconfex–Yoko–Opel–Colnago
1989	Belgium	Jean-Marie Wampers	Panasonic–Isostar–Colnago–Agu
1990	Netherlands	John Talen	Panasonic–Sportlife
1991	Italy	Mario Cipollini	Del Tongo
1992	Belgium	Wilfried Nelissen	Panasonic–Sportlife
1993	Italy	Mario Cipollini	GB–MG Maglificio
1994	Belgium	Peter Van Petegem	Trident
1995	Italy	Rossano Brasi	Polti–Granarolo–Santini
1996	Belgium	Frank Vandenbroucke	Mapei–GB
1997	Germany	Erik Zabel	Team Telekom
1998	Netherlands	Servais Knaven	TVM–Farm Frites
1999	Netherlands	Jeroen Blijlevens	TVM–Farm Frites
2000	Italy	Endrio Leoni	Alessio
2001	Italy	Endrio Leoni	Alessio
2002	Australia	Robbie McEwen	Lotto–Adecco
2003	Belgium	Ludovic Capelle	Landbouwkrediet–Colnago
2004	Belgium	Tom Boonen	Quick-Step–Davitamon
2005	Netherlands	Thorwald Veneberg	Rabobank
2006	Belgium	Tom Boonen	Quick-Step–Innergetic
2007	Great Britain	Mark Cavendish	T-Mobile Team
2008	Great Britain	Mark Cavendish	Team High Road
2009	Italy	Alessandro Petacchi	LPR Brakes–Farnese Vini
2010	United States	Tyler Farrar	Garmin–Transitions
2011	Great Britain	Mark Cavendish	HTC–Highroad
2012	Germany	Marcel Kittel	Argos–Shimano
2013	Germany	Marcel Kittel	Argos–Shimano
2014	Germany	Marcel Kittel	Giant–Shimano
2015	Norway	Alexander Kristoff	Team Katusha
2016	Germany	Marcel Kittel	Etixx–Quick-Step
2017	Germany	Marcel Kittel	Quick-Step Floors
2018	Netherlands	Fabio Jakobsen	Quick-Step Floors
2019	Netherlands	Fabio Jakobsen	Deceuninck–Quick-Step
2020	Australia	Caleb Ewan	Lotto–Soudal
2021	Belgium	Jasper Philipsen	Alpecin–Fenix
2022	Norway	Alexander Kristoff	Intermarché–Wanty–Gobert Matériaux
2023	Belgium	Jasper Philipsen	Alpecin–Deceuninck
2024	Belgium	Tim Merlier	Soudal–Quick-Step
2025	Belgium	Tim Merlier	Soudal–Quick-Step
2026	Belgium	Tim Merlier	Soudal–Quick-Step

=== Multiple winners ===
Wins	Rider	Editions
5	Marcel Kittel (GER)	2012, 2013, 2014, 2016, 2017
3	Piet Oellibrandt (BEL)	1960, 1962, 1963
3	Mark Cavendish (GBR)	2007, 2008, 2011
3	Tim Merlier (BEL)	2024, 2025, 2026
2	Florent Luyckx (BEL)	1910, 1911
2	Joseph Van Wetter (BEL)	1912, 1913
2	René Vermandel (BEL)	1921, 1924
2	Godefried De Vocht (BEL)	1931, 1932
2	Achiel Buysse (BEL)	1939, 1948
2	Stan Ockers (BEL)	1941, 1946
2	Rik Van Looy (BEL)	1956, 1957
2	Raymond Vrancken (BEL)	1958, 1961
2	Marc Demeyer (BEL)	1974, 1977
2	Ludo Peeters (BEL)	1980, 1984
2	Jean-Paul van Poppel (NED)	1986, 1988
2	Mario Cipollini (ITA)	1991, 1993
2	Endrio Leoni (ITA)	2000, 2001
2	Tom Boonen (BEL)	2004, 2006
2	Fabio Jakobsen (NED)	2018, 2019
2	Alexander Kristoff (NOR)	2015, 2022
2	Jasper Philipsen (BEL)	2021, 2023

=== Wins per country ===
Wins	Country
81	Belgium
11	Netherlands
7	Germany (including West Germany)
6	Italy
3	Great Britain
2	Australia; Norway
1	France; United States

== Women's winners ==
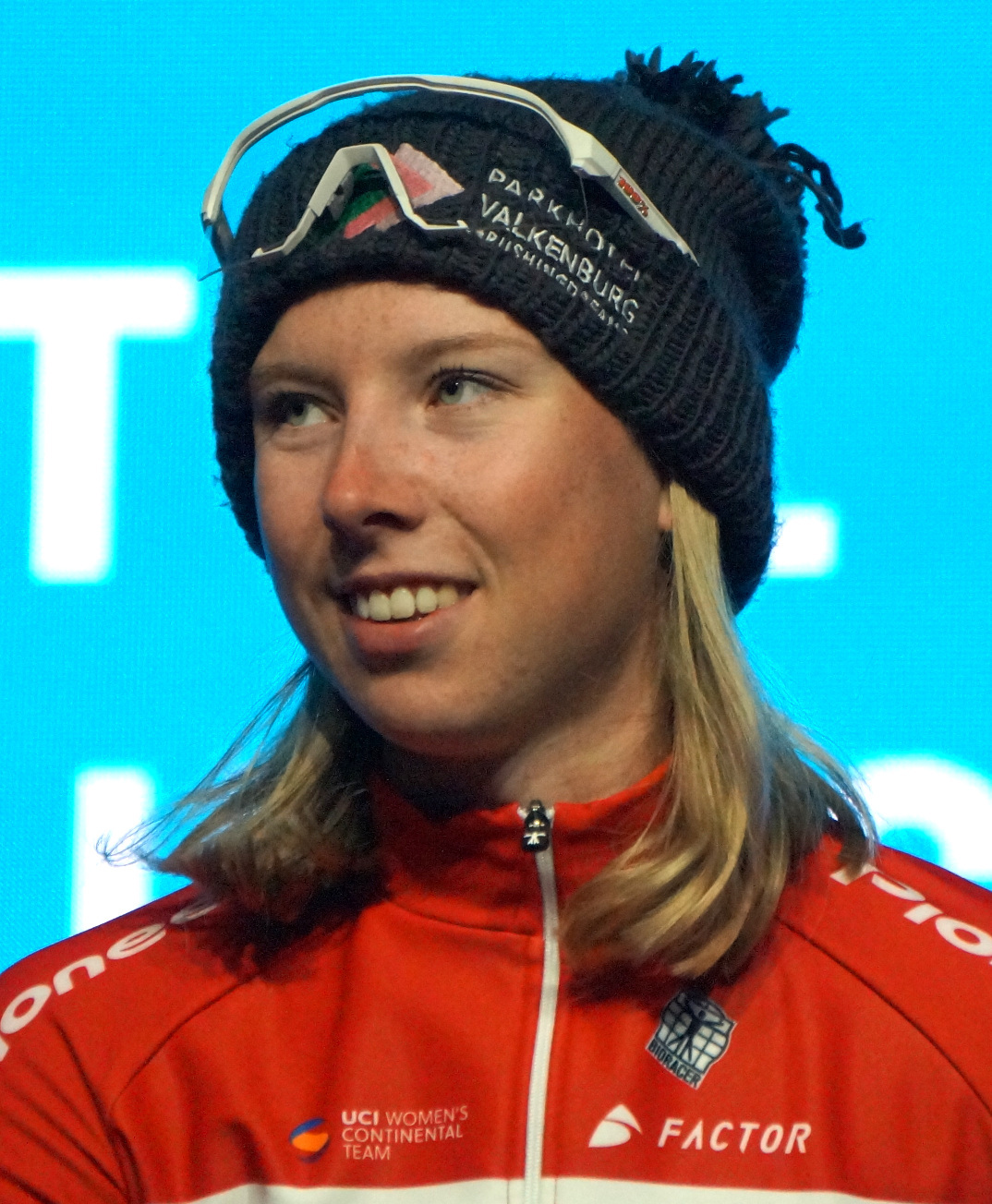
Dutch sprinter Lorena Wiebes won the first four editions of the women's Scheldeprijs.

Year	Country	Rider	Team
2021	Netherlands	Lorena Wiebes	Team DSM
2022	Netherlands	Lorena Wiebes	Team DSM
2023	Netherlands	Lorena Wiebes	SD Worx
2024	Netherlands	Lorena Wiebes	Team SD Worx–Protime
2025	Italy	Elisa Balsamo	Lidl–Trek
2026	Netherlands	Charlotte Kool	Fenix–Premier Tech

=== Wins per country ===
Wins	Country
5	Netherlands
1	Italy
