= 2014 Scheldeprijs =

Race details
- Dates: 9 April 2014
- Stages: 1
- Distance: 200.9 km (124.8 mi)
- Winning time: 4h 33' 53"

Results
	Winner	Marcel Kittel (GER)	(Giant–Shimano)
	Second	Tyler Farrar (USA)	(Garmin–Sharp)
	Third	Danny van Poppel (NED)	(Trek Factory Racing)

The 2014 Scheldeprijs cycling race took place on 9 April. It was the 102nd time the Scheldeprijs was run. Marcel Kittel won the race for a third time, equaling the record of Piet Oellibrandt and Mark Cavendish, but being the first person in history with three consecutive wins.

The race was characterized by an early break consisting of six riders: Jan Ghyselinck, Luke Rowe, Dmitriy Gruzdev, Ivan Balykin, Andrea Fedi and Alessandro Bazzana, which built up a maximum lead of five minutes. About 10 km from the finish, the peloton led by Omega Pharma–Quick-Step, reduced the gap to 1 minute. This was the sign for Luke Rowe to attack, eventually being caught up by Andrea Fedi who did the same thing a bit later. Two kilometers from the finish the Italian was also caught up by the peloton, in which Omega Pharma–Quick-Step and Garmin–Sharp were preparing the sprint. Marcel Kittel started the sprint early but managed to speed away from his opponents. Behind him Tyler Farrar and Danny van Poppel finished second and third.

== Results ==
	Cyclist	Team	Time
1	Marcel Kittel (GER)	Giant–Shimano	4h 33' 53"
2	Tyler Farrar (USA)	Garmin–Sharp	s.t.
3	Danny van Poppel (NED)	Trek Factory Racing	s.t.
4	Alessandro Petacchi (ITA)	Omega Pharma–Quick-Step	s.t.
5	Sam Bennett (IRL)	NetApp–Endura	s.t.
6	Davide Appollonio (ITA)	Ag2r–La Mondiale	s.t.
7	Danilo Napolitano (ITA)	Wanty–Groupe Gobert	s.t.
8	Andrea Guardini (ITA)	Astana	s.t.
9	Yannick Martinez (FRA)	Team Europcar	s.t.
10	Matteo Pelucchi (ITA)	IAM Cycling	s.t.
