= 1987 Scheldeprijs =

Cycling race

Race details
- Dates: 28 April 1987
- Stages: 1
- Distance: 247 km (153.5 mi)
- Winning time: 6h 00' 30"

Results
	Winner	Etienne de Wilde (BEL)
	Second	Jean-Paul van Poppel (NED)
	Third	Marnix Lameire (BEL)

The 1987 Scheldeprijs was the 74th edition of the Scheldeprijs road cycling race, held on 28 April 1987. The race was won by Belgian rider Etienne De Wilde.

== Result ==
Final general classification

Rank	Rider	Time
1	Etienne de Wilde (BEL)	6h 00' 00"
2	Jean-Paul van Poppel (NED)	+ 0"
3	Marnix Lameire (BEL)	+ 0"
4	Teun van Vliet (NED)	+ 0"
5	Mathieu Hermans (NED)	+ 0"
6	Peter Pieters (NED)	+ 0"
7	Marcel Arntz (NED)	+ 0"
8	Jozef Lieckens (BEL)	+ 0"
9	Jesper Skibby (DEN)	+ 0"
10	Marc Dierickx (BEL)	+ 0"
