= 2001 Scheldeprijs =

Race details
- Dates: 25 April 2001
- Stages: 1
- Distance: 208 km (129.2 mi)
- Winning time: 4h 49' 00"

Results
	Winner	Endrio Leoni (ITA)	(Alessio)
	Second	Jeroen Blijlevens (NED)	(Lotto–Adecco)
	Third	Kurt Asle Arvesen (NOR)	(Team Fakta)

The 2001 Scheldeprijs was the 88th edition of the Scheldeprijs cycle race and was held on 25 April 2001. The race was won by Endrio Leoni of the Alessio team.

== General classification ==
Final general classification

Rank	Rider	Team	Time
1	Endrio Leoni (ITA)	Alessio	4h 49' 00"
2	Jeroen Blijlevens (NED)	Lotto–Adecco	+ 0"
3	Kurt Asle Arvesen (NOR)	Team Fakta	+ 0"
4	Fred Rodriguez (USA)	Domo–Farm Frites–Latexco	+ 0"
5	Remco van der Ven (NED)	Bankgiroloterij–Batavus	+ 0"
6	Servais Knaven (NED)	Domo–Farm Frites–Latexco	+ 0"
7	Andreas Klier (GER)	Team Telekom	+ 0"
8	Björn Leukemans (BEL)	Vlaanderen–T Interim	+ 0"
9	Chris Peers (BEL)	Cofidis	+ 0"
10	Ludo Dierckxsens (BEL)	Lampre–Daikin	+ 0"
