= 2000 Scheldeprijs =

Race details
- Dates: 19 April 2000
- Stages: 1
- Distance: 200.4 km (124.5 mi)
- Winning time: 4h 24' 00"

Results
	Winner	Endrio Leoni (ITA)	(Alessio–Banca SMG)
	Second	Jeroen Blijlevens (NED)	(Team Polti)
	Third	Léon van Bon (NED)	(Rabobank)

The 2000 Scheldeprijs was the 87th edition of the Scheldeprijs cycle race and was held on 19 April 2000. The race was won by Endrio Leoni of the Alessio team.

== General classification ==
Final general classification

Rank	Rider	Team	Time
1	Endrio Leoni (ITA)	Alessio–Banca SMG	4h 24' 00"
2	Jeroen Blijlevens (NED)	Team Polti	+ 0"
3	Léon van Bon (NED)	Rabobank	+ 0"
4	Ronny Assez (BEL)	Flanders–Prefetex	+ 0"
5	Gian Matteo Fagnini (ITA)	Team Telekom	+ 0"
6	Lars Michaelsen (DEN)	Française des Jeux	+ 0"
7	Erik Zabel (GER)	Team Telekom	+ 0"
8	Paolo Bossoni (ITA)	Cantina Tollo–Regain	+ 0"
9	Tom Steels (BEL)	Mapei–Quick-Step	+ 0"
10	Matthew Gilmore (BEL)	Memory Card–Jack & Jones	+ 0"
