= 2011 Scheldeprijs =

- Event poster with previous winner Tyler Farrar

Race details
- Dates: 9 April 2011
- Stages: 1
- Distance: 200 km (124.3 mi)
- Winning time: 4h 29' 57"

Results
	Winner	Mark Cavendish (GBR)	(HTC–Highroad)
	Second	Denis Galimzyanov (RUS)	(Team Katusha)
	Third	Yauheni Hutarovich (BLR)	(FDJ)

The 2011 Scheldeprijs cycling race took place on 9 April 2011. It was the 99th time the Scheldeprijs was run. Mark Cavendish won the race for a third time equally the record of Piet Oellibrandt. He won the 99th Scheldeprijs ahead of Denis Galimzyanov for Team Katusha and Yauheni Hutarovich for FDJ.

== Results ==
	Cyclist	Team	Time
1	Mark Cavendish (GBR)	HTC–Highroad	4h 29' 57"
2	Denis Galimzyanov (RUS)	Team Katusha	s.t.
3	Yauheni Hutarovich (BLR)	FDJ	s.t.
4	Stefan van Dijk (NED)	Veranda's Willems–Accent	s.t.
5	Robbie McEwen (AUS)	Team RadioShack	s.t.
6	Francesco Chicchi (ITA)	Quick-Step	s.t.
7	Alexander Kristoff (NOR)	BMC Racing Team	s.t.
8	Theo Bos (NED)	Rabobank	s.t.
9	Frederique Robert (BEL)	Quick-Step	s.t.
10	Kenny van Hummel (NED)	Skil–Shimano	s.t.
