= Jérémie Galland =

French cyclist

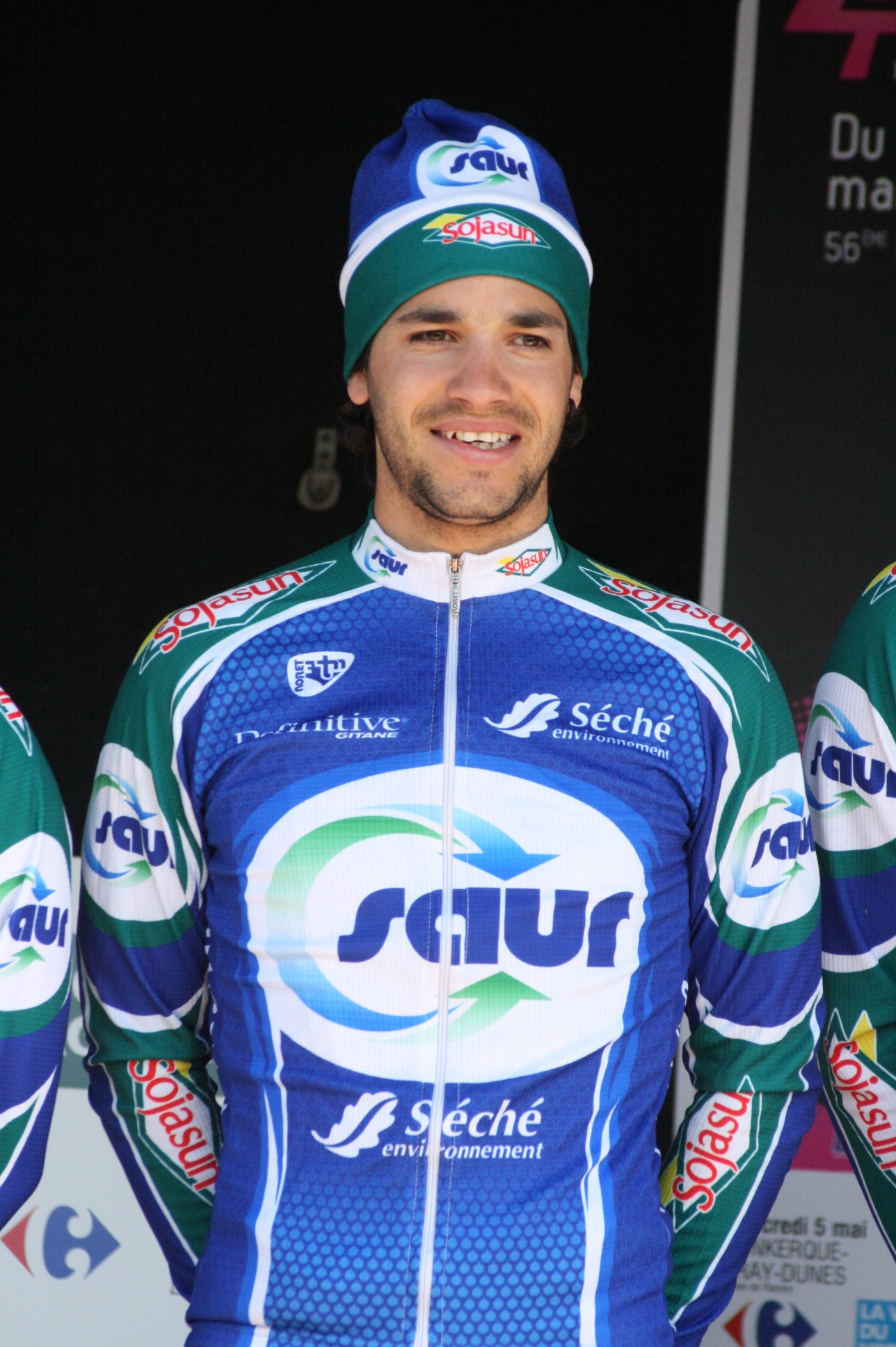
- Galland at the teams presentation for the 2010 Four Days of Dunkirk

Personal information
- Born: 8 April 1983 (age 43) Villeneuve-Saint-Georges, France
- Height: 1.74 m (5 ft 8 1/2 in)
- Weight: 62 kg (137 lb)

Cycling career
- Sport: Cycling
- Current team: Retired
- Discipline: Road
- Role: Rider

Amateur teams
- 2005: Cofidis (stagiaire)
- 2006: Agritubel (stagiaire)

Professional teams
- 2007–2008: Auber 93
- 2009–2013: Besson Chaussures–Sojasun

Jérémie Galland (born 8 April 1983) is a French former professional road cyclist, who competed as a professional between 2007 and 2013.

== Major results ==
2008
3rd Route Adélie
4th Grand Prix de Fourmies
2009
6th Le Samyn
7th Paris–Troyes
1st Overall Grand Prix de Plumelec-Morbihan
6th Boucles de l'Aulne
3rd Overall Ronde de l'Oise
9th Overall Boucles de la Mayenne
4th Tour de la Somme
2010
6th Boucles de l'Aulne
1st Overall Boucles de la Mayenne
2nd Polynormande
4th Overall Paris–Corrèze
1st Stage 1 Tour du Limousin
2011
9th Overall Tour de Picardie
3rd Grand Prix de Plumelec-Morbihan
6th Overall Tour de Luxembourg
2013
4th Grand Prix Pino Cerami
