= 1982 Scheldeprijs =

Race details
- Dates: 27 July 1982
- Stages: 1
- Distance: 175 km (108.7 mi)
- Winning time: 3h 55' 00"

Results
| | Winner | Ludo Schurgers (BEL) |
| | Second | Jan Nevens (BEL) |
| | Third | Charles Jochums (BEL) |

The 1982 Scheldeprijs was the 69th edition of the Scheldeprijs cycle race and was held on 27 July 1982. The race was won by Ludo Schurgers.

== General classification ==
Final general classification

| Rank | Rider | Time |
|---|---|---|
| 1 | Ludo Schurgers (BEL) | 3h 55' 00" |
| 2 | Jan Nevens (BEL) | + 3" |
| 3 | Charles Jochums (BEL) | + 5" |
| 4 | Patrick Hermans (BEL) | + 5" |
| 5 | Kurt Dockx (BEL) | + 5" |
| 6 | Ronny Naets (BEL) | + 5" |
| 7 | Pierot Cuypers (BEL) | + 5" |
| 8 | Dirk Heirweg (BEL) | + 5" |
| 9 | Willy Scheers (BEL) | + 5" |
| 10 | Jos Van de Poel (BEL) | + 5" |
