= 1988 Scheldeprijs =

Race details
- Dates: 26 April 1988
- Stages: 1
- Distance: 249 km (154.7 mi)
- Winning time: 6h 12' 00"

Results
	Winner	Jean-Paul van Poppel (NED)
	Second	Eddy Planckaert (BEL)
	Third	Hans Daams (NED)

The 1988 Scheldeprijs was the 75th edition of the Scheldeprijs cycle race and was held on 26 April 1988. The race was won by Jean-Paul van Poppel.

== General classification ==
Final general classification

Rank	Rider	Time
1	Jean-Paul van Poppel (NED)	6h 12' 00"
2	Eddy Planckaert (BEL)	+ 0"
3	Hans Daams (NED)	+ 0"
4	Marcel Arntz (NED)	+ 0"
5	Frank Pirard (NED)	+ 0"
6	Wiebren Veenstra (NED)	+ 0"
7	Eric Vanderaerden (BEL)	+ 0"
8	Werner Devos (BEL)	+ 0"
9	Marnix Lameire (BEL)	+ 0"
10	Hendrik Redant (BEL)	+ 0"
