= 1967 Scheldeprijs =

Race details
- Dates: 1 August 1967
- Stages: 1
- Distance: 236 km (146.6 mi)
- Winning time: 5h 44' 00"

Results
	Winner	Paul In 't Ven (BEL)
	Second	Henk Nijdam (NED)
	Third	Joseph Mathy (BEL)

The 1967 Scheldeprijs was the 54th edition of the Scheldeprijs cycle race and was held on 1 August 1967. The race was won by Paul In 't Ven.

== General classification ==
Final general classification

Rank	Rider	Time
1	Paul In 't Ven (BEL)	5h 44' 00"
2	Henk Nijdam (NED)	+ 30"
3	Joseph Mathy (BEL)	+ 30"
4	Jozef Boons (BEL)	+ 30"
5	Jean-Baptiste Claes (BEL)	+ 30"
6	Hans Junkermann (FRG)	+ 30"
7	Willy In 't Ven (BEL)	+ 30"
8	Edward Sels (BEL)	+ 30"
9	Daniel Van Ryckeghem (BEL)	+ 30"
10	Jan Harings (NED)	+ 30"
