= 2000 Grand Prix de Denain =

Race details
- Dates: 20 April 2000
- Stages: 1
- Distance: 196.2 km (121.9 mi)
- Winning time: 4h 28' 20"

Results
	Winner	Endrio Leoni (ITA)
	Second	Thor Hushovd (NOR)
	Third	Leonardo Guidi (ITA)

The 2000 Grand Prix de Denain was the 42nd edition of the Grand Prix de Denain cycle race and was held on 20 April 2000. The race was won by Endrio Leoni.

== General classification ==
Final general classification

Rank	Rider	Time
1	Endrio Leoni (ITA)	4h 28' 20"
2	Thor Hushovd (NOR)	+ 0"
3	Leonardo Guidi (ITA)	+ 0"
4	Jo Planckaert (BEL)	+ 0"
5	Lars Michaelsen (DEN)	+ 0"
6	Marcel Wüst (GER)	+ 0"
7	Ludovic Capelle (BEL)	+ 0"
8	Martin van Steen (NED)	+ 0"
9	Jaan Kirsipuu (EST)	+ 0"
10	Niko Eeckhout (BEL)	+ 0"
