= 1986 Scheldeprijs =

Race details
- Dates: 25 August 1986
- Stages: 1
- Distance: 249 km (155 mi)
- Winning time: 6h 00' 00"

Results
	Winner	Jean-Paul van Poppel (NED)
	Second	Wim Arras (BEL)
	Third	Eric Vanderaerden (BEL)

The 1986 Scheldeprijs was the 73rd edition of the Scheldeprijs cycle race and was held on 25 August 1986. The race was won by Jean-Paul van Poppel.

== General classification ==
Final general classification

Rank	Rider	Time
1	Jean-Paul van Poppel (NED)	6h 00' 00"
2	Wim Arras (BEL)	+ 0"
3	Eric Vanderaerden (BEL)	+ 0"
4	Johan Capiot (BEL)	+ 0"
5	Ad Wijnands (NED)	+ 0"
6	Mario Mariotti (ITA)	+ 0"
7	Dirk Demol (BEL)	+ 0"
8	Luc De Decker (BEL)	+ 0"
9	Werner Devos (BEL)	+ 0"
10	Luc Govaerts (BEL)	+ 0"
