= Maurice Leturgie =

French cyclist

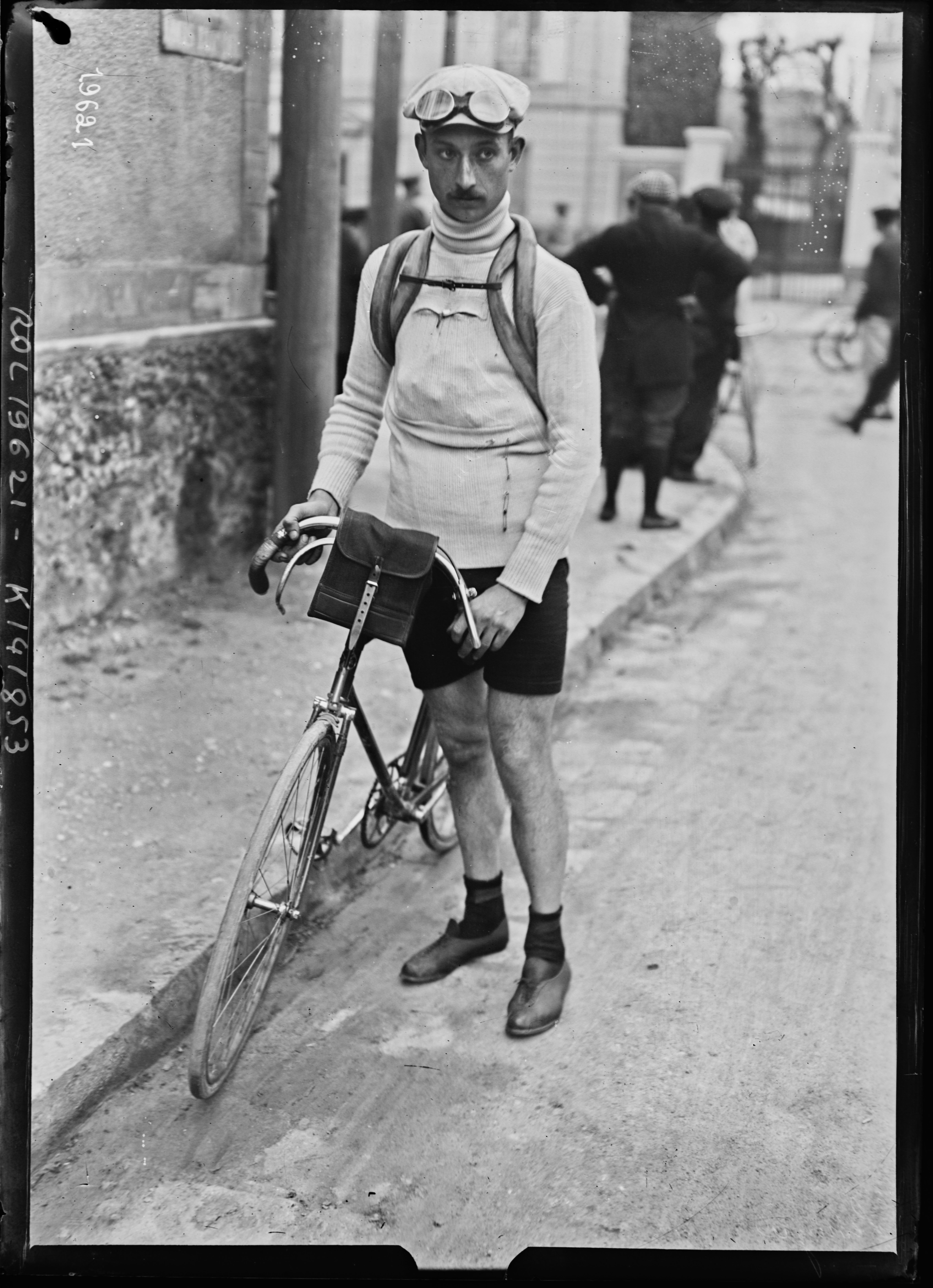
- Maurice Leturgie in 1912

Personal information
- Born: 8 November 1886 Lille, France
- Died: 24 November 1959 (aged 73) Ardres, France

Cycling career
- Sport: Cycling
- Role: Rider

Maurice Leturgie (8 November 1886 – 24 November 1959) was a French racing cyclist. In 1907, he won the inaugural edition of the Scheldeprijs one-day race. He also rode in three editions of the Tour de France.
