= Endrio Leoni =

Italian cyclist

Personal information
- Full name: Endrio Leoni
- Born: 22 August 1968 (age 58) Dolo, Italy

Cycling career
- Sport: Cycling
- Discipline: Road
- Role: Rider

Amateur team
- 1988–1989: Zalf–Euromobil–Désirée–Fior

Professional teams
- 1990–1994: Jolly Componibili–Club 88
- 1995: Brescialat–Fago
- 1996: San Marco Group
- 1996–1997: Aki–Gipiemme
- 1998: Ballan
- 1999: Liquigas
- 2000–2002: Alessio

Major wins
- Grand Tours Giro d'Italia 4 Individual Stages (1992, 1994) Vuelta a España 1 Individual Stage (1994) One-day races and Classics Scheldeprijs (2000, 2001)

Endrio Leoni (born 22 August 1968 in Dolo) is a retired road bicycle racer from Italy, who was a professional rider from 1990 to 2002. He only served teams from his native country. Leoni twice won the Scheldeprijs (2000 and 2001).

== Major results ==
1987
1st GP Città di Venezia
1989
1st Vicenza–Bionde
7th Gran Premio della Liberazione
1990
1st Stage 3 Ruota d'Oro
3rd GP Bruno Beghelli
1991
9th Overall Giro di Puglia
1992
1st Stages 1 & 11 Giro d'Italia
1st Stage 5 Settimana Internazionale di Coppi e Bartali
1st Stage 3 Settimana Lombarda
1993
1st Stage 5 Tirreno–Adriatico
1st Stage 1 Giro di Puglia
1994
1st Stages 1a & 5 Giro d'Italia
1st Stage 4 Vuelta a España
1st Stage 1 Ruta Mexico
1996
3rd Road race, National Road Championships
1997
1st Giro del Lago Maggiore
1st Stage 1 Tirreno–Adriatico
1st Stage 1 Ronde van Nederland
2nd Trofeo Luis Puig
1998
1st Stage 1 Giro della Provincia di Reggio Calabri
2nd Giro del Friuli
1999
1st Gran Premio della Costa Etruschi
1st Stage 3 Volta a Portugal
2000
1st Scheldeprijs
1st GP de Denain Porte du Hainaut
1st Poreč Trophy
1st Stage 3 Vuelta a Murcia
2nd Gran Premio della Costa Etruschi
4th Clásica de Almería
2001
1st Scheldeprijs
1st Stages 2 & 8 Tirreno–Adriatico
1st Points classification Volta ao Algarve

1st Stages 1, 2 & 4

1st Stage 2 Vuelta a Murcia
1st Stage 1a Vuelta a Castilla y León
1st Points classification Vuelta a Aragón
2002
1st Stages 1 & 3 Vuelta a Andalucía

=== Grand Tour general classification results timeline ===
Grand Tour	1991	1992	1993	1994	1995	1996	1997	1998	1999	2000	2001
Vuelta a España	—	—	—	DNF	—	—	DNF	—	DNF	DNF	DNF
Giro d'Italia	133	DNF	106	DNF	—	—	DNF	DNF	DNF	—	DNF
Tour de France	Did not contest during career										

Legend
DSQ	Disqualified
DNF	Did not finish
