= Paul In 't Ven =

Belgian cyclist

Personal information
- Born: 1 April 1945 (age 81) Turnhout, Belgium

Cycling career
- Sport: Cycling
- Current team: Retired
- Discipline: Road
- Role: Rider

Professional teams
- 1967–1969: Dr. Mann–Grundig
- 1970: Germanvox–Wega
- 1971: Flandria–Mars

Paul In 't Ven (born 1 April 1945) is a Belgian former racing cyclist. He rode in the 1967 and 1969 Tour de France as well as the 1970 Giro d'Italia. His brother Willy and nephew Danny were also professional cyclists. In 1967, he also won the Scheldeprijs, Grand Prix d'Isbergues and the Heistse Pijl.

== Major results ==
1966
1st Stages 2 & 4 Tour de Namur
1967
1st Scheldeprijs
1st Heistse Pijl
1st Grand Prix d'Isbergues
1st Stage 2 (TTT) Tour of Belgium
2nd Grote Prijs Marcel Kint
3rd Omloop Mandel-Leie-Schelde
