= Jurgen Van Goolen =

Belgian cyclist

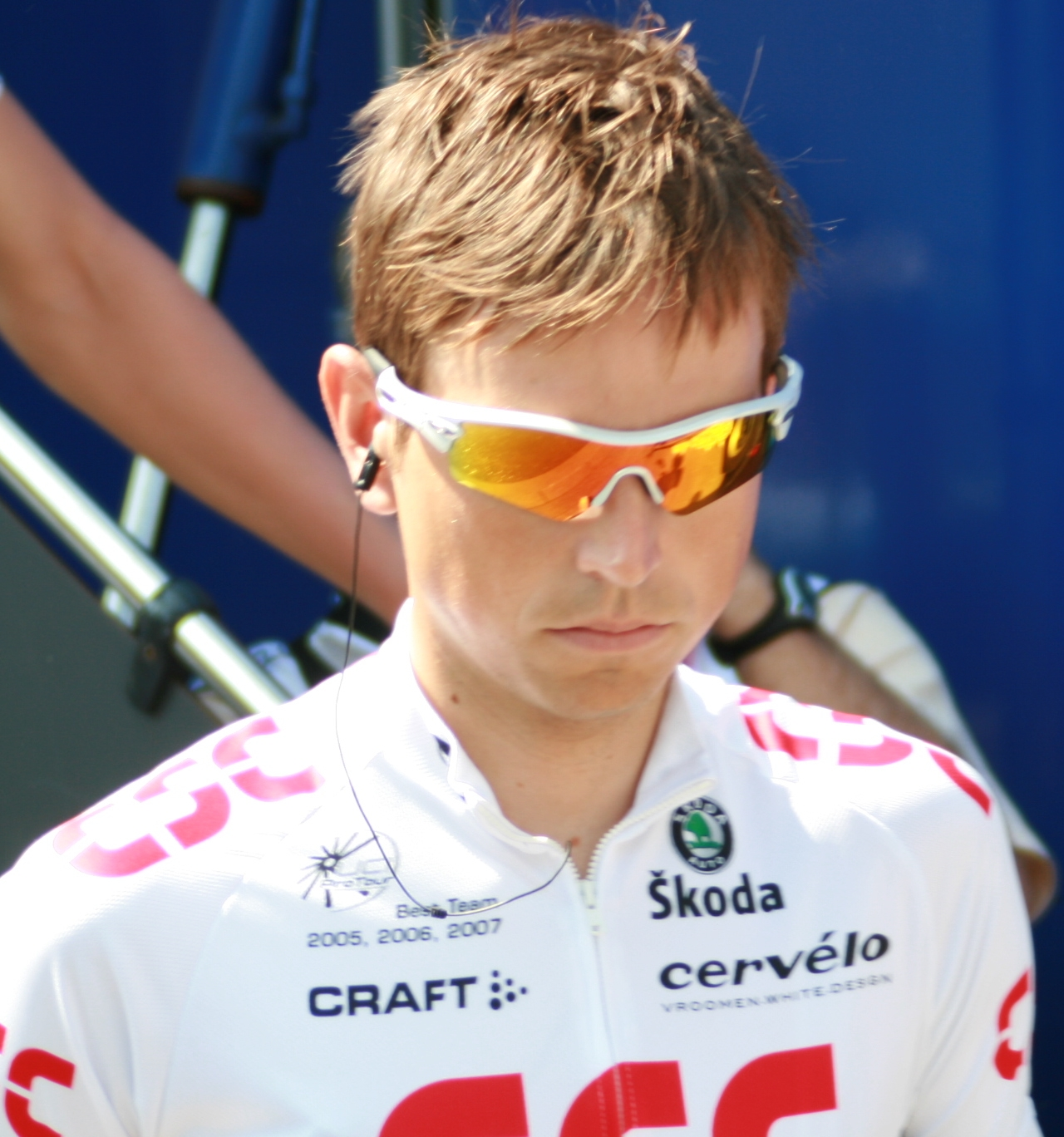
- Van Goolen at the 2008 Four Days of Dunkirk.

Personal information
- Full name: Jurgen Van Goolen
- Born: 28 November 1980 (age 45) Leuven, Belgium

Cycling career
- Sport: Cycling
- Current team: Retired
- Discipline: Road
- Role: Rider

Amateur teams
- 1999–2000: Saeco-Mapei
- 2001: Domo-Farm Frites

Professional teams
- 2002: Domo-Farm Frites
- 2003–2005: Quick-Step–Davitamon
- 2006–2007: Discovery Channel
- 2008–2009: Team CSC
- 2010: Omega Pharma–Lotto
- 2011–2013: Veranda's Willems–Accent

Jurgen Van Goolen (born 28 November 1980 in Leuven, Flanders), is a Belgian former professional road bicycle racer.

He rode the Vuelta a España eight times, and the Giro d'Italia two times during his career, serving mostly as a domestique. On five occasions, he was part of the Belgian squad for the World Road Race Championships. Although Van Goolen was considered a big talent as a youngster, winning the award for Best Young Belgian Rider in 2000, his professional career never really lived up to these promises. In January 2014, he announced his retirement.

== Major results ==
2000
1st National Under-23 Time Trial Championships
1st GP Wielerrevue
1st U23 Liège–Bastogne–Liège
1st overall GP Tell

1st Stage 2

2001
1st National Under-23 Time Trial Championships
3rd Zesbergenprijs Harelbeke
5th Hasselt–Spa–Hasselt

2003
2nd National Road Race Championships
2nd overall Danmark Rundt
5th overall Tour de Wallonie
10th overall Three Days of De Panne

2004
3rd overall Tour de l'Ain
10th overall Four Days of Dunkirk
10th overall Tour of Belgium

2006
9th overall Tour of Austria

2007
9th overall Tour of Austria

2008
4th Gran Premio Nobili Rubinetterie
9th overall Tour de Wallonie

2011
1st Stage 3 Route du Sud
3rd Druivenkoers Overijse
7th overall Tour de Luxembourg

2013
2nd Druivenkoers Overijse
6th Grote Prijs Jef Scherens
