= Davide Appollonio =

Italian road bicycle racer

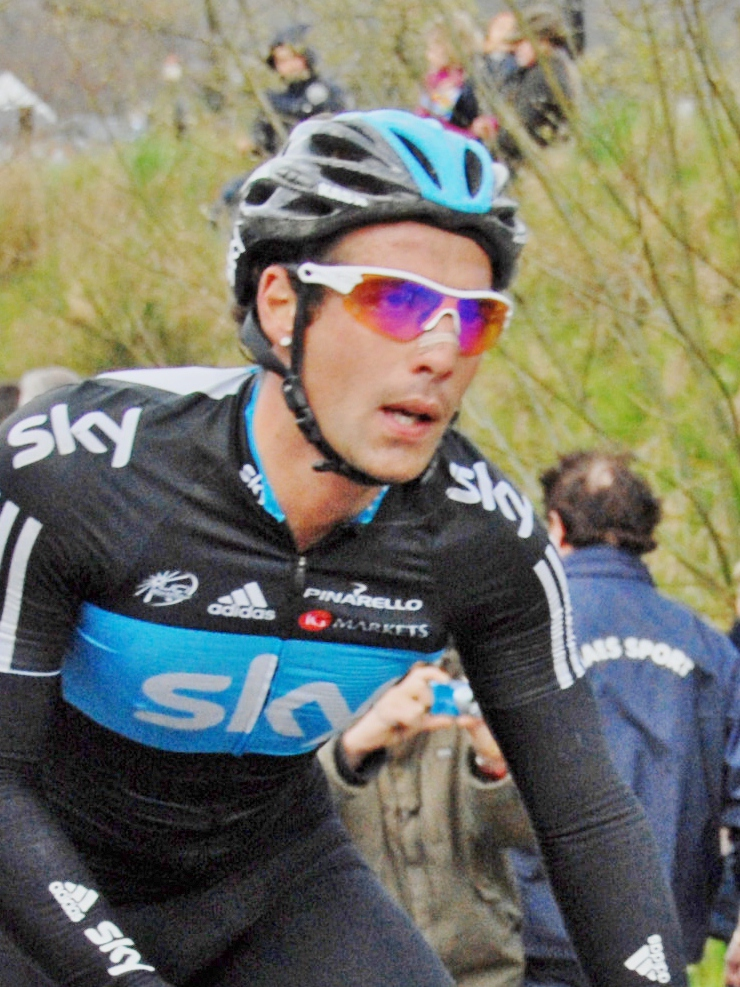
- Appollonio at the 2012 Liège–Bastogne–Liège

Personal information
- Full name: Davide Appollonio
- Nickname: Appo Jet
- Born: 2 June 1989 (age 37) Isernia, Italy
- Height: 1.70 m (5 ft 7 in)
- Weight: 67 kg (148 lb)

Cycling career
- Sport: Cycling
- Discipline: Road
- Role: Rider
- Rider type: Sprinter

Amateur teams
- 2007–2008: Vangi Sparo Caparol
- 2009: Hopplà–Seano–Bellissima

Professional teams
- 2009: → Cervélo TestTeam (stagiaire)
- 2010: Cervélo TestTeam
- 2011–2012: Team Sky
- 2013–2014: Ag2r–La Mondiale
- 2015: Androni Giocattoli
- 2019–2021: Amore & Vita–Prodir

Davide Appollonio (born 2 June 1989) is an Italian professional road bicycle racer, who most recently rode for UCI Continental team Amore & Vita.

== Career ==
Born in Isernia, Appollonio first made an impression in the professional ranks riding as a stagiaire for Cervélo TestTeam during the latter part of 2009, before signing for the team as a neo-pro for the 2010 season.

He joined Team Sky for the 2011 season, picking up his first win for the team on the 3rd stage of the Tour de Luxembourg, and then his first overall Sprints competition the following day. Appollonio left Team Sky at the end of the 2012 season, and joined Ag2r–La Mondiale on a two-year contract from the 2013 season onwards. In October 2014 he announced that he would join Androni Giocattoli for 2015, the first time Appollonio had joined an Italian professional cycling team.

On 30 June 2015 Appollonio gave an adverse analytical finding for EPO, on 14 June – two weeks after completing the Giro d'Italia, and was provisionally suspended. He was suspended for four years, and returned to the peloton with Amore & Vita–Prodir at the 2019 Volta a Portugal; he won the opening road stage of the race.

== Major results ==
2009
5th Gran Premio della Liberazione
6th Gran Premio Palio del Recioto
2010
1st Stage 4 Tour du Limousin
2nd Grand Prix de Fourmies
2nd Tour de Vendée
5th Clásica de Almería
7th Coppa Sabatini
10th Grand Prix Pino Cerami
2011
Tour de Luxembourg

1st Points classification
1st Stage 3

1st Stage 1 Tour du Poitou-Charentes
7th Overall Ster ZLM Toer
2012
4th London Nocturne
2013
5th Paris–Bourges
2014
2nd Roma Maxima
6th Scheldeprijs
2015
~~1st Points classification Tour of Slovenia~~
3rd Grand Prix of Aargau Canton
2019
1st Stage 1 Volta a Portugal

=== Grand Tour general classification results timeline ===
Grand Tour	2011	2012	2013	2014	2015
Giro d'Italia	DNF	—	168	DNF	123
Tour de France	—	—	—	—	—
Vuelta a España	—	—	—	—	—

Legend
—	Did not compete
DNF	Did not finish
