= 2011 Tour de Luxembourg =

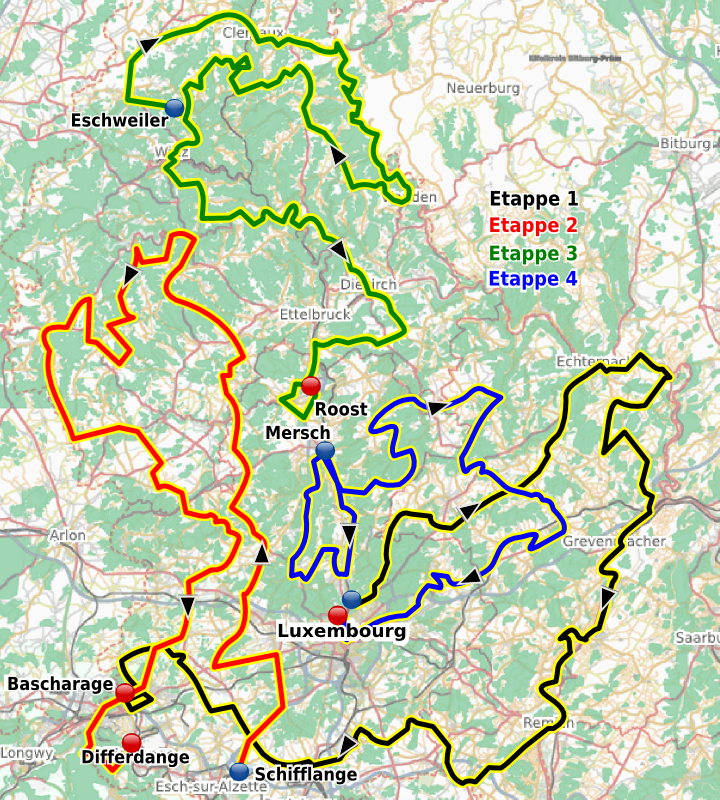
- Route of the Tour de Luxembourg

Race details
- Dates: 1–5 June
- Stages: 4 + Prologue
- Distance: 730.6 km (454.0 mi)
- Winning time: 18h 35' 32"

Results
Jersey awarded to the overall winner	Winner	Linus Gerdemann (GER)	(Leopard Trek)
	Second	Alexandre Geniez (FRA)	(Skil–Shimano)
	Third	Tony Gallopin (FRA)	(Cofidis)
Jersey awarded to the points classification winner	Points	Davide Appollonio (ITA)	(Team Sky)
Jersey awarded to the mountains classification winner	Mountains	Christian Poos (LUX)	(Differdange–Magic–SportFood.de)
Jersey awarded to the youth classification winner	Youth	Alexandre Geniez (FRA)	(Skil–Shimano)
	Team	Cofidis	

The 2011 Tour de Luxembourg cycling race was the 71st running of the Tour de Luxembourg. It was won by Linus Gerdemann from Germany, a member of the Luxembourg-based team, Leopard Trek. Gerdemann became in doing so the first German to ever win the Tour de Luxembourg.

== Stages ==
Key:
: Leader and eventual winner of General Classification, based on total time.
: Leader and eventual winner of points classification, based on points given for finishing position on each mass start stage.
: Leader and eventual winner of climbers' classification, based on points gained on passing hilltops.
: Leader and eventual winner of young riders' classification, based on total time, but restricted to riders under 25 at beginning of year.

=== Prologue ===
1 June 2011 — Luxembourg, 2.7 km (1.7 mi) (ITT)

Prologue result and General Classification after Prologue
	Rider	Team	Time
1	Fabian Cancellara (SUI)	Leopard Trek	3' 42"
2	Damien Gaudin (FRA)	Team Europcar	+ 5"
3	Jimmy Engoulvent (FRA)	Saur–Sojasun	+ 8"
4	Roman Feillu (FRA)	Vacansoleil–DCM	+ 11"
5	Mathew Hayman (AUS)	Team Sky	s.t.
6	Jimmy Casper (FRA)	Saur–Sojasun	s.t.
7	Borut Božič (SLO)	Vacansoleil–DCM	s.t.
8	Martin Mortensen (DEN)	Leopard Trek	+ 14"
9	Laurent Mangel (FRA)	Saur–Sojasun	s.t.
10	Grégory Rast (SUI)	Team RadioShack	+ 15"

=== Stage 1 ===
2 June 2011 – Luxembourg to Bascharage, 192.8 km (119.8 mi)

Stage 1 Result
	Rider	Team	Time
1	Denis Galimzyanov (RUS)	Team Katusha	4h 48' 32"
2	Gregory Henderson (NZL)	Team Sky	s.t.
3	Davide Appollonio (ITA)	Team Sky	s.t.
4	Mathew Hayman (AUS)	Team Sky	+ 3"
5	Jacopo Guarnieri (ITA)	Liquigas–Cannondale	s.t.
6	Jeremy Hunt (GBR)	Team Sky	s.t.
7	Mickaël Delage (FRA)	FDJ	s.t.
8	Michael Van Staeyen (BEL)	Topsport Vlaanderen–Mercator	s.t.
9	Joeri Stallaert (BEL)	Landbouwkrediet	s.t.
10	Mitchell Docker (AUS)	Skil–Shimano	s.t.

General Classification after Stage 1
	Rider	Team	Time
1	Fabian Cancellara (SUI)	Leopard Trek	4h 52' 17"
2	Damien Gaudin (FRA)	Team Europcar	+ 5"
3	Jimmy Casper (FRA)	Saur–Sojasun	+ 8"
4	Roman Feillu (FRA)	Vacansoleil–DCM	+ 11"
5	Mathew Hayman (AUS)	Team Sky	+ 11"
6	Borut Božič (SLO)	Vacansoleil–DCM	+ 11"
7	Martin Mortensen (DEN)	Leopard Trek	+ 14"
8	Laurent Mangel (FRA)	Saur–Sojasun	+ 14"
9	Grégory Rast (SUI)	Team RadioShack	+ 15"
10	Ian Stannard (GBR)	Team Sky	+ 15"

=== Stage 2 ===
3 June 2011 – Schifflange to Differdange, 200.7 km (124.7 mi)

Stage 2 Result
	Rider	Team	Time
1	Linus Gerdemann (GER)	Leopard Trek	5h 16' 19"
2	Arthur Vichot (FRA)	FDJ	+ 9"
3	Jérémie Galland (FRA)	Saur–Sojasun	s.t.
4	Mickaël Delage (FRA)	FDJ	s.t.
5	Tony Gallopin (FRA)	Cofidis	s.t.
6	Julien El Fares (FRA)	Cofidis	s.t.
7	Alan Marangoni (ITA)	Liquigas–Cannondale	s.t.
8	Björn Leukemans (BEL)	Vacansoleil–DCM	s.t.
9	Chris Froome (GBR)	Team Sky	s.t.
10	Maxime Monfort (BEL)	Leopard Trek	s.t.

General Classification after Stage 2
	Rider	Team	Time
1	Linus Gerdemann (GER)	Leopard Trek	10h 08' 55"
2	Alexandre Geniez (FRA)	Skil–Shimano	+ 2"
3	Tony Gallopin (FRA)	Cofidis	+ 3"
4	Maxime Monfort (BEL)	Leopard Trek	+ 5"
5	Mickaël Delage (FRA)	FDJ	+ 8"
6	Jérémie Galland (FRA)	Saur–Sojasun	+ 10"
7	Jurgen Van Goolen (BEL)	Veranda's Willems–Accent	+ 11"
8	Julien El Fares (FRA)	Cofidis	s.t.
9	Björn Leukemans (BEL)	Vacansoleil–DCM	+ 12"
10	Alan Marangoni (ITA)	Liquigas–Cannondale	+ 13"

=== Stage 3 ===
4 June 2011 – Eschweiler to Roost (Luxlait), 185.0 km (115.0 mi)

Stage 3 Result
	Rider	Team	Time
1	Davide Appollonio (ITA)	Team Sky	4h 44' 31"
2	Denis Galimzyanov (RUS)	Team Katusha	s.t.
3	Mickaël Delage (FRA)	FDJ	s.t.
4	Romain Feillu (FRA)	Vacansoleil–DCM	s.t.
5	Pieter Vanspeybrouck (BEL)	Topsport Vlaanderen–Mercator	s.t.
6	Tony Gallopin (FRA)	Cofidis	s.t.
7	Alexandre Geniez (FRA)	Skil–Shimano	s.t.
8	Davide Cimolai (ITA)	Liquigas–Cannondale	s.t.
9	Borut Božič (SLO)	Vacansoleil–DCM	s.t.
10	Jérémie Galland (FRA)	Saur–Sojasun	s.t.

General Classification after Stage 3
	Rider	Team	Time
1	Linus Gerdemann (GER)	Leopard Trek	14h 53' 26"
2	Alexandre Geniez (FRA)	Skil–Shimano	+ 2"
3	Tony Gallopin (FRA)	Cofidis	+ 3"
4	Maxime Monfort (BEL)	Leopard Trek	+ 5"
5	Mickaël Delage (FRA)	FDJ	+ 8"
6	Jérémie Galland (FRA)	Saur–Sojasun	+ 10"
7	Jurgen Van Goolen (BEL)	Veranda's Willems–Accent	+ 11"
8	Julien El Fares (FRA)	Cofidis	s.t.
9	Björn Leukemans (BEL)	Vacansoleil–DCM	+ 12"
10	Alan Marangoni (ITA)	Liquigas–Cannondale	+ 13"

=== Stage 4 ===
5 June 2011 – Mersch to Luxembourg, 152.1 km (94.5 mi)

Stage 4 Result
	Rider	Team	Time
1	Romain Feillu (FRA)	Vacansoleil–DCM	3h 42' 06"
2	Fränk Schleck (LUX)	Leopard Trek	s.t.
3	Pieter Vanspeybrouck (BEL)	Topsport Vlaanderen–Mercator	s.t.
4	Tony Gallopin (FRA)	Cofidis	s.t.
5	Davide Appollonio (ITA)	Team Sky	s.t.
6	Maxime Vantomme (BEL)	Team Katusha	s.t.
7	Julien El Fares (FRA)	Cofidis	s.t.
8	Jérémie Galland (FRA)	Saur–Sojasun	s.t.
9	Linus Gerdemann (GER)	FDJ	s.t.
10	Jens Keukeleire (BEL)	Cofidis	s.t.

Final General Classification
	Rider	Team	Time
1	Linus Gerdemann (GER)	Leopard Trek	18h 35' 32"
2	Alexandre Geniez (FRA)	Skil–Shimano	+ 2"
3	Tony Gallopin (FRA)	Cofidis	+ 3"
4	Maxime Monfort (BEL)	Leopard Trek	+ 5"
5	Mickaël Delage (FRA)	FDJ	+ 8"
6	Jérémie Galland (FRA)	Saur–Sojasun	+ 10"
7	Jurgen Van Goolen (BEL)	Veranda's Willems–Accent	+ 11"
8	Julien El Fares (FRA)	Cofidis	s.t.
9	Björn Leukemans (BEL)	Vacansoleil–DCM	+ 12"
10	Alan Marangoni (ITA)	Liquigas–Cannondale	+ 13"

== Classification leadership ==
Stage	Winner	General classification	Points classification	Mountains classification	Young rider classification	Team classification
P	Fabian Cancellara	Fabian Cancellara	not awarded	not awarded	Damien Gaudin	Leopard Trek
1	Denis Galimzyanov	Fabian Cancellara	Denis Galimzyanov	Christian Poos	Damien Gaudin	Saur–Sojasun
2	Linus Gerdemann	Linus Gerdemann	Linus Gerdemann	Christian Poos	Alexandre Geniez	Cofidis
3	Davide Appollonio	Linus Gerdemann	Denis Galimzyanov	Christian Poos	Alexandre Geniez	Cofidis
4	Romain Feillu	Linus Gerdemann	Davide Appollonio	Christian Poos	Alexandre Geniez	Cofidis
Final		Linus Gerdemann	Davide Appollonio	Christian Poos	Alexandre Geniez	Cofidis

== Final standings ==
=== General classification ===
	Rider	Team	Time
1	Linus Gerdemann (GER)	Leopard Trek	18h 35' 32"
2	Alexandre Geniez (FRA)	Skil–Shimano	+ 2"
3	Tony Gallopin (FRA)	Cofidis	+ 3"
4	Maxime Monfort (BEL)	Leopard Trek	+ 5"
5	Mickaël Delage (FRA)	FDJ	+ 8"
6	Jérémie Galland (FRA)	Saur–Sojasun	+ 10"
7	Jurgen Van Goolen (BEL)	Veranda's Willems–Accent	+ 11"
8	Julien El Fares (FRA)	Cofidis	s.t.
9	Björn Leukemans (BEL)	Vacansoleil–DCM	+ 12"
10	Alan Marangoni (ITA)	Liquigas–Cannondale	+ 13"

=== Points classification ===
	Rider	Team	Points
1	Davide Appollonio (ITA)	Team Sky	42
2	Denis Galimzyanov (RUS)	Team Katusha	36
3	Romain Feillu (FRA)	Vacansoleil–DCM	31
4	Mickaël Delage (FRA)	FDJ	29
5	Tony Gallopin (FRA)	Cofidis	27
6	Linus Gerdemann (GER)	Leopard Trek	22
7	Pieter Vanspeybrouck (BEL)	Topsport Vlaanderen–Mercator	22
8	Jérémie Galland (FRA)	Saur–Sojasun	17
9	Arthur Vichot (FRA)	FDJ	16
10	Fränk Schleck (LUX)	Leopard Trek	16

=== Mountains classification ===
	Rider	Team	Points
1	Christian Poos (LUX)	Differdange–Magic–SportFood.de	40
2	Johannes Fröhlinger (GER)	Skil–Shimano	32
3	Anthony Geslin (FRA)	FDJ	17
4	Anthony Delaplace (FRA)	Saur–Sojasun	15
5	Anthony Charteau (FRA)	Team Europcar	10
6	Linus Gerdemann (GER)	Leopard Trek	10
7	Martijn Keizer (NED)	Vacansoleil–DCM	10
8	Javier Ramirez (ESP)	Andalucía–Caja Granada	10
9	Sébastien Delfosse (BEL)	Landbouwkrediet	7
10	Bert Scheirlinckx (BEL)	Landbouwkrediet	7

=== Young riders classification ===
	Rider	Team	Time
1	Alexandre Geniez (FRA)	Skil–Shimano	18h 35' 34"
2	Tony Gallopin (FRA)	Cofidis	+ 1"
3	Arthur Vichot (FRA)	FDJ	+ 12"
4	Anthony Roux (FRA)	FDJ	+ 53"
5	Romain Zingle (BEL)	Cofidis	+ 58"
6	Damien Gaudin (FRA)	Team Europcar	+ 1' 39"
7	Rémi Cusin (FRA)	Cofidis	+ 1' 51"
8	Pieter Vanspeybrouck (BEL)	Topsport Vlaanderen–Mercator	+ 1' 54"
9	Davide Appollonio (ITA)	Team Sky	+ 1' 55"
10	Simon Geschke (GER)	Skil–Shimano	+ 1' 58"

=== Team classification ===
Pos.	Team	Time
1	Cofidis	55h 47' 36"
2	FDJ	+ 6"
3	Leopard Trek	+ 31"
4	Saur–Sojasun	+ 43"
5	Skil–Shimano	+ 2' 58"
6	Team Sky	+ 3' 10"
7	Liquigas–Cannondale	+ 3' 32"
8	Veranda's Willems–Accent	+ 3' 33"
9	Vacansoleil–DCM	+ 3' 51"
10	Landbouwkrediet	+ 3' 52"
