= Jean-Paul van Poppel =

Dutch cyclist (born 1962)

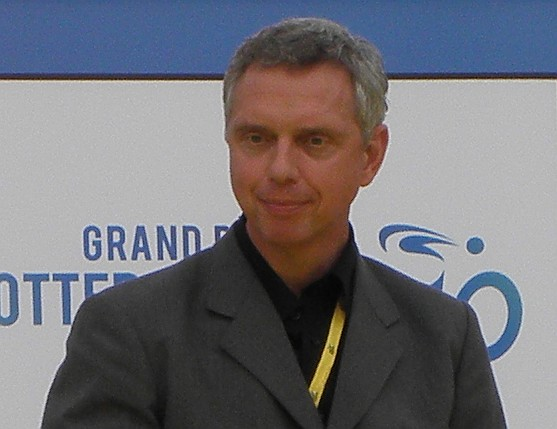

Personal information
- Full name: Jean-Paul van Poppel
- Nickname: Popeye
- Born: 30 September 1962 (age 64) Tilburg, the Netherlands

Cycling career
- Sport: Cycling
- Current team: Retired
- Discipline: Road
- Role: Rider; Sports director
- Rider type: Sprinter

Professional teams
- 1985–1986: Skala–Gazelle
- 1987–1988: Superconfex–Kwantum–Yoko–Colnago
- 1989–1990: Panasonic–Isostar–Colnago–Agu
- 1991–1992: PDM–Concorde–Ultima
- 1993–1994: Festina–Lotus
- 1995: Le Groupement

Managerial teams
- 2000: Dutch national women's team
- 2001: Acca Due O
- 2003: American national women's team
- 2004: Farm Frites–Hartol
- 2005–2008: Team Flexpoint
- 2009–2010: Cervélo TestTeam
- 2011–2014: Vacansoleil Pro Cycling Team
- 2015–2019: Roompot–Charles

Major wins
- Grand Tours Tour de France Points classification (1987) 9 individual stages (1987, 1988, 1991, 1992, 1994) Giro d'Italia 4 individual stages (1986, 1989) Vuelta a España 9 individual stages (1991–1994)

Jean-Paul van Poppel (born 30 September 1962 in Tilburg, North Brabant) is a Dutch former racing cyclist, who was nicknamed Popeye.

Van Poppel was one of the most successful Dutch road sprinters. He won stages in mass sprints in all three Grand Tours, sometimes from positions that appeared lost. In the Tour de France he won 9 stages altogether. In 1988 he won 4 stages, the highest won number by a Dutch cyclist in one tour. He also competed in the individual road race event at the 1984 Summer Olympics.

Van Poppel won the points classification in the 1987 Tour de France. After he ended his career in 1995, he became a directeur sportif in women's cycling. With his first wife, cyclist Leontine van der Lienden, Jean-Paul van Poppel has two sons, Boy van Poppel who currently rides for UCI WorldTeam Intermarché–Wanty., and Danny van Poppel currently riding for Red Bull–Bora–Hansgrohe and a daughter Kim. Van der Lienden and Van Poppel have since divorced. Van Poppel remarried in 2004 with one of his team members, cyclist Mirjam Melchers.

From 2009 to 2010 he was one of the sports directors at the Cervélo Test Team based in Switzerland. From 2011, he has served as a sports director for the Vacansoleil–DCM until 2014. From 2015 till the team folded in 2019, van Poppel serves as a sports director for the Dutch ProContinental Team Team Roompot, together with Erik Breukink and Michael Boogerd.

== Major results ==
1985
1st Stage 7 Danmark Rundt
1st Stage 5 Tour de l'Avenir
1st Stage 3a Tour of Belgium
1986
1st Scheldeprijs
Giro d'Italia

1st Stages 2 & 13

1st Stage 4 Tirreno–Adriatico
1987
Tour de France

1st Points classification
1st Stages 8 & 17

Tour of Sweden

1st Stages 5, 6a & 7

1988
1st Scheldeprijs
Tour de France

1st Stages 3, 10, 17 & 22

1989
Giro d'Italia

1st Stages 1 & 15

1st Veenendaal–Veenendaal
1991
Vuelta a España

1st Stages 6, 9, 13 & 21

1st Stage 7 Tour de France
1st Stage 5 Paris–Nice
1992
Vuelta a España

1st Stages 3 & 5

1st Stage 10 Tour de France
1993
Vuelta a España

1st Stages 4 & 8

1994
1st Overall Étoile de Bessèges
1st Stage 2 Tour de France
1st Stage 9 Vuelta a España

== See also ==
- List of Dutch Olympic cyclists
