= Petrus Oellibrandt =

Belgian cyclist

Personal information
- Full name: Petrus Oellibrandt
- Born: 1 December 1935 Beveren, Belgium
- Died: 15 June 2014 (aged 78)

Cycling career
- Sport: Cycling
- Role: Rider

Petrus Oellibrandt (1 December 1935 – 15 June 2014) was a Belgian racing cyclist. He won the Belgian national road race title in 1959.
