= 1945 Gent–Wevelgem =

Race details
- Dates: 29 July 1945
- Stages: 1
- Distance: 200 km (120 mi)
- Winning time: 5h 35' 00"

Results
	Winner	Robert Van Eenaeme (BEL)
	Second	Maurice Van Herzele (BEL)
	Third	André Declerck (BEL)

The 1945 Gent–Wevelgem was the seventh edition of the Belgian Gent–Wevelgem cycle race and was held on 29 July 1945. The race started in Ghent and finished in Wevelgem. The race was won by Robert Van Eenaeme.

== General classification ==
Final general classification

Rank	Rider	Time
1	Robert Van Eenaeme (BEL)	5h 35' 00"
2	Maurice Van Herzele (BEL)	+ 0"
3	André Declerck (BEL)	+ 0"
4	Félicien Vandendriessche (BEL)	+ 0"
5	Désiré Marien (BEL)	+ 0"
6	Roger Dujardin (BEL)	+ 30"
7	Jules Lowie (BEL)	+ 30"
8	Albert Decin (BEL)	+ 1' 20"
9	Jérôme Dufromont (BEL)	+ 3' 40"
10	Adolph Verschueren (BEL)	+ 3' 40"
