= 1935 Gent–Wevelgem =

Race details
- Dates: 30 June 1935
- Stages: 1
- Distance: 120 km (75 mi)
- Winning time: 3h 28' 00"

Results
	Winner	Albert Depreitere (BEL)
	Second	Jérôme Dufromont (BEL)
	Third	Karel Catrysse (BEL)

The 1935 Gent–Wevelgem was the second edition of the Belgian Gent–Wevelgem cycle race and was held on 30 June 1935. The race started in Ghent and finished in Wevelgem. The race was won by Albert Depreitere.

== General classification ==
Final general classification

Rank	Rider	Time
1	Albert Depreitere (BEL)	3h 28' 00"
2	Jérôme Dufromont (BEL)	+ 45"
3	Karel Catrysse (BEL)	+ 1' 00"
4	Urbain Desmet (BEL)	+ 1' 25"
5	Gérard Vlaemynck (BEL)	+ 2' 05"
6	Remi Verstichelen (BEL)	+ 3' 00"
7	Lucien Storme (BEL)	+ 4' 15"
8	Albert Roose (BEL)	+ 4' 15"
9	Joseph Devos (BEL)	+ 6' 15"
10	Albert Rommelaere (BEL)	+ 6' 15"
