= 1936 Gent–Wevelgem =

Race details
- Dates: 28 May 1936
- Stages: 1
- Distance: 168 km (104 mi)
- Winning time: 4h 31' 00"

Results
	Winner	Robert Van Eenaeme (BEL)
	Second	Joseph Somers (BEL)
	Third	Gaston Denys (BEL)

The 1936 Gent–Wevelgem was the third edition of the Belgian Gent–Wevelgem cycle race and was held on 28 May 1936. The race started in Ghent and finished in Wevelgem. The race was won by Robert Van Eenaeme.

== General classification ==
Final general classification

Rank	Rider	Time
1	Robert Van Eenaeme (BEL)	4h 31' 00"
2	Joseph Somers (BEL)	+ 0"
3	Gaston Denys (BEL)	+ 0"
4	Marcel Van Houtte (BEL)	+ 32"
5	Joseph Devos (BEL)	+ 32"
6	César Pappens (BEL)	+ 32"
7	Joseph Oprins (BEL)	+ 2' 30"
8	Albert Van Wesemael (BEL)	+ 2' 30"
9	Gustave Beckaert (BEL)	+ 5' 50"
10	Maurice Van Herzele (BEL)	+ 7' 15"
