= 1934 Gent–Wevelgem =

Race details
- Dates: 9 September 1934
- Stages: 1
- Distance: 120 km (75 mi)
- Winning time: 3h 20' 00"

Results
	Winner	Gustave Van Belle (BEL)
	Second	Maurice Vandenberghe (BEL)
	Third	Jérôme Dufromont (BEL)

The 1934 Gent–Wevelgem was the inaugural edition of the Belgian Gent–Wevelgem cycle race and was held on 9 September 1934. The race started in Ghent and finished in Wevelgem. The race was won by Gustave Van Belle.

== General classification ==
Final general classification

Rank	Rider	Time
1	Gustave Van Belle (BEL)	3h 20' 00"
2	Maurice Vandenberghe (BEL)	+ 20"
3	Jérôme Dufromont (BEL)	+ 1' 10"
4	Emile David (BEL)	+ 1' 20"
5	Richard Depoorter (BEL)	+ 2' 40"
6	André Hallaert (BEL)	+ 3' 00"
7	Joseph Devos (BEL)	+ 3' 45"
8	Joris Rogghe (BEL)	+ 3' 45"
9	Henri Pattyn (BEL)	+ 3' 55"
10	André Pattyn (BEL)	+ 4' 10"
