= 1947 Gent–Wevelgem =

Race details
- Dates: 30 March 1947
- Stages: 1
- Distance: 230 km (140 mi)
- Winning time: 6h 45' 00"

Results
| | Winner | Maurice Desimpelaere (BEL) |
| | Second | René Beyens (BEL) |
| | Third | Lucien Vlaemynck (BEL) |

The 1947 Gent–Wevelgem was the ninth edition of the Belgian Gent–Wevelgem cycle race and was held on 30 March 1947. The race started in Ghent and finished in Wevelgem. The race was won by cyclist Maurice Desimpelaere.

== General classification ==
Final general classification

| Rank | Rider | Time |
|---|---|---|
| 1 | Maurice Desimpelaere (BEL) | 6h 45' 00" |
| 2 | René Beyens (BEL) | + 0" |
| 3 | Lucien Vlaemynck (BEL) | + 0" |
| 4 | Valère Ollivier (BEL) | + 2' 10" |
| 5 | André Rosseel (BEL) | + 2' 10" |
| 6 | Achiel Buysse (BEL) | + 2' 45" |
| 7 | Roger Cnockaert (BEL) | + 2' 45" |
| 8 | Sylvain Grysolle (BEL) | + 2' 45" |
| 9 | Gino Bartali (ITA) | + 2' 45" |
| 10 | Emmanuel Thoma (BEL) | + 2' 45" |
