= 1939 Gent–Wevelgem =

Cycle race

Race details
- Dates: 24 May 1939
- Stages: 1
- Distance: 155 km (96 mi)
- Winning time: 4h 23' 00"

Results
	Winner	André Declerck (BEL)
	Second	Frans Van Hellemont (BEL)
	Third	Albert Van Laecke (BEL)

The 1939 Gent–Wevelgem was the sixth edition of the Belgian Gent–Wevelgem cycle race and was held on 24 May 1939. The race started in Ghent and finished in Wevelgem. The race was won by André Declerck.

== General classification ==
Final general classification

Rank	Rider	Time
1	André Declerck (BEL)	4h 23' 00"
2	Frans Van Hellemont (BEL)	+ 0"
3	Albert Van Laecke (BEL)	+ 0"
4	Louis Van Espenhout (BEL)	+ 1' 15"
5	Georges Vandermeirsch (BEL)	+ 1' 15"
6	Victor Codron (BEL)	+ 1' 15"
7	Albert Fonteyne (BEL)	+ 2' 40"
8	Frans Van Ransbeeck (BEL)	+ 2' 40"
9	Gabriel Jacobs (BEL)	+ 4' 40"
10	Rémi Decroix (BEL)	+ 6' 30"
