= 1961 Gent–Wevelgem =

Race details
- Dates: 16 April 1961
- Stages: 1
- Distance: 231 km (144 mi)
- Winning time: 5h 36' 28"

Results
	Winner	Frans Aerenhouts (BEL)	(Mercier–BP–Hutchinson)
	Second	Raymond Impanis (BEL)	(Faema)
	Third	Yvo Molenaers (BEL)	(Carpano)

The 1961 Gent–Wevelgem was the 23rd edition of the Belgian Gent–Wevelgem cycle race and was held on 16 April 1961. The race started in Ghent and finished in Wevelgem. The race was won by Frans Aerenhouts of the Mercier team.

== General classification ==
Final general classification

Rank	Rider	Team	Time
1	Frans Aerenhouts (BEL)	Mercier–BP–Hutchinson	5h 36' 28"
2	Raymond Impanis (BEL)	Faema	+ 0"
3	Yvo Molenaers (BEL)	Carpano	+ 0"
4	André Noyelle (BEL)	Wiel's–Flandria	+ 0"
5	Marcel Janssens (BEL)	Dr. Mann	+ 0"
6	Armand Desmet (BEL)	Faema	+ 0"
7	Gilbert Desmet (BEL)	Carpano	+ 7"
8	Arthur Decabooter (BEL)	Groene Leeuw–SAS–Sinalco	+ 7"
9	Rik Luyten (BEL)	Wiel's–Flandria	+ 7"
10	Norbert Kerckhove (BEL)	Dr. Mann	+ 7"
