= 1960 Gent–Wevelgem =

Race details
- Dates: 17 April 1960
- Stages: 1
- Distance: 256 km (159 mi)
- Winning time: 6h 35' 00"

Results
| | Winner | Frans Aerenhouts (BEL) | (Mercier–BP–Hutchinson) |
| | Second | Frans De Mulder (BEL) | (Wiel's–Flandria) |
| | Third | Jef Planckaert (BEL) | (Wiel's–Flandria) |

The 1960 Gent–Wevelgem was the 22nd edition of the Belgian Gent–Wevelgem cycle race and was held on 17 April 1960. The race started in Ghent and finished in Wevelgem. The race was won by Frans Aerenhouts of the Mercier team.

== General classification ==
Final general classification

| Rank | Rider | Team | Time |
|---|---|---|---|
| 1 | Frans Aerenhouts (BEL) | Mercier–BP–Hutchinson | 6h 35' 00" |
| 2 | Frans De Mulder (BEL) | Wiel's–Flandria | + 0" |
| 3 | Jef Planckaert (BEL) | Wiel's–Flandria | + 0" |
| 4 | Arthur Decabooter (BEL) | Groene Leeuw–Sinalco–SAS | + 38" |
| 5 | Jo de Roo (NED) | Helyett–Leroux–Fynsec–Hutchinson | + 38" |
| 6 | Leon Vandaele (BEL) | Wiel's–Flandria | + 38" |
| 7 | Martin Van Geneugden (BEL) | Carpano | + 38" |
| 8 | Antoon van der Steen (NED) | Locomotief | + 38" |
| 9 | Frans Schoubben (BEL) | Peugeot–BP–Dunlop | + 38" |
| 10 | René Van Meenen (BEL) | Faema | + 38" |
