= 1937 Gent–Wevelgem =

- Poster with the events in Wevelgem

Race details
- Dates: 13 May 1937
- Stages: 1
- Distance: 160 km (99 mi)
- Winning time: 4h 20' 00"

Results
	Winner	Robert Van Eenaeme (BEL)
	Second	Albert Ritserveldt (BEL)
	Third	André Hallaert (BEL)

The 1937 Gent–Wevelgem was the fourth edition of the Belgian Gent–Wevelgem cycle race and was held on 13 May 1937. The race started in Ghent and finished in Wevelgem. The race was won by Robert Van Eenaeme.

== General classification ==
Final general classification

Rank	Rider	Time
1	Robert Van Eenaeme (BEL)	4h 20' 00"
2	Albert Ritserveldt (BEL)	+ 0"
3	André Hallaert (BEL)	+ 15"
4	Michel Verschueren (BEL)	+ 30"
5	René De Walsche (BEL)	+ 30"
6	Pol Verschueren (BEL)	+ 30"
7	Joseph Croes (BEL)	+ 30"
8	Alphonse Demulder (BEL)	+ 30"
9	Marcel Van Schelle (BEL)	+ 1' 40"
10	Albert Van Herzele (BEL)	+ 3' 20"
