= 1950 Gent–Wevelgem =

Race details
- Dates: 26 March 1950
- Stages: 1
- Distance: 255 km (158 mi)
- Winning time: 6h 44' 00"

Results
| | Winner | Briek Schotte (BEL) |
| | Second | Albert Decin (BEL) |
| | Third | André Declercq (BEL) |

The 1950 Gent–Wevelgem was the 12th edition of the Belgian Gent–Wevelgem cycle race and was held on 26 March 1950. The race started in Ghent and finished in Wevelgem. The race was won by Briek Schotte.

== General classification ==
Final general classification

| Rank | Rider | Time |
|---|---|---|
| 1 | Briek Schotte (BEL) | 6h 44' 00" |
| 2 | Albert Decin (BEL) | + 2' 46" |
| 3 | André Declercq (BEL) | + 2' 46" |
| 4 | Marcel Ryckaert (BEL) | + 2' 46" |
| 5 | Emmanuel Thoma (BEL) | + 2' 46" |
| 6 | Edward Klabiński (POL) | + 2' 46" |
| 7 | André Pieters (BEL) | + 2' 46" |
| 8 | Joseph Van Stayen (BEL) | + 2' 46" |
| 9 | Roger Decock (BEL) | + 2' 46" |
| 10 | Roger Desmet (BEL) | + 2' 46" |
