= 1938 Gent–Wevelgem =

Race details
- Dates: 2 June 1938
- Stages: 1
- Distance: 165 km (103 mi)
- Winning time: 4h 53' 00"

Results
	Winner	Hubert Godart (BEL)
	Second	Edmond Delathouwer (BEL)
	Third	Gustave Van Cauwenberghe (BEL)

The 1938 Gent–Wevelgem was the fifth edition of the Belgian Gent–Wevelgem cycle race and was held on 2 June 1938. The race started in Ghent and finished in Wevelgem. The race was won by Hubert Godart.

== General classification ==
Final general classification

Rank	Rider	Time
1	Hubert Godart (BEL)	4h 53' 00"
2	Edmond Delathouwer (BEL)	+ 0"
3	Gustave Van Cauwenberghe (BEL)	+ 0"
4	Romain Vandermeersch (BEL)	+ 0"
5	Martin Van Den Broeck (BEL)	+ 0"
6	René van Hove (NED)	+ 0"
7	Roger Dujardin (BEL)	+ 1' 40"
8	Albert Van Dijck (BEL)	+ 1' 40"
9	Maurice Van Der Elst (BEL)	+ 1' 40"
10	Cees Heeren (NED)	+ 1' 40"
