= Mont Cassel =

Hill in northern France

Coordinates: 50.800556°N 2.488333°E

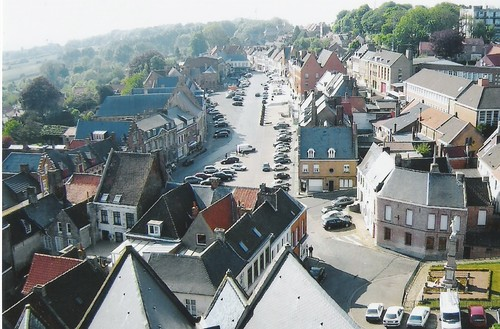
View from the bell tower on the top of Mont Cassel

Mont Cassel (Dutch: Kasselberg) is a hill in northern France, in the Nord department. The hill rises to a height of 176 metres (577 ft) above sea level, making it the highest of the Westhoek region. At the top of Mont Cassel is the commune of Cassel (Dutch: Kassel), about 30 kilometres (19 mi) from the North Sea. Its geological composition comprises limestone capped with a very hard ferruginous layer of rock.

== History ==
During the late Iron Age the hill of Cassel was inhabited by the Menapii, a Belgic tribe, who made the hill-top settlement the capital of a large territory extending from modern Calais to as far as the Rhine. The hilltop was probably used as an oppidum or hill fort. The Menapii were absorbed into the Roman province of Gallia Belgica in the first century B.C. Cassel was redeveloped as Castellum Menapiorum, the urban centre or civitas of the Menapii. The modern town and hill take their name from the Roman settlement.

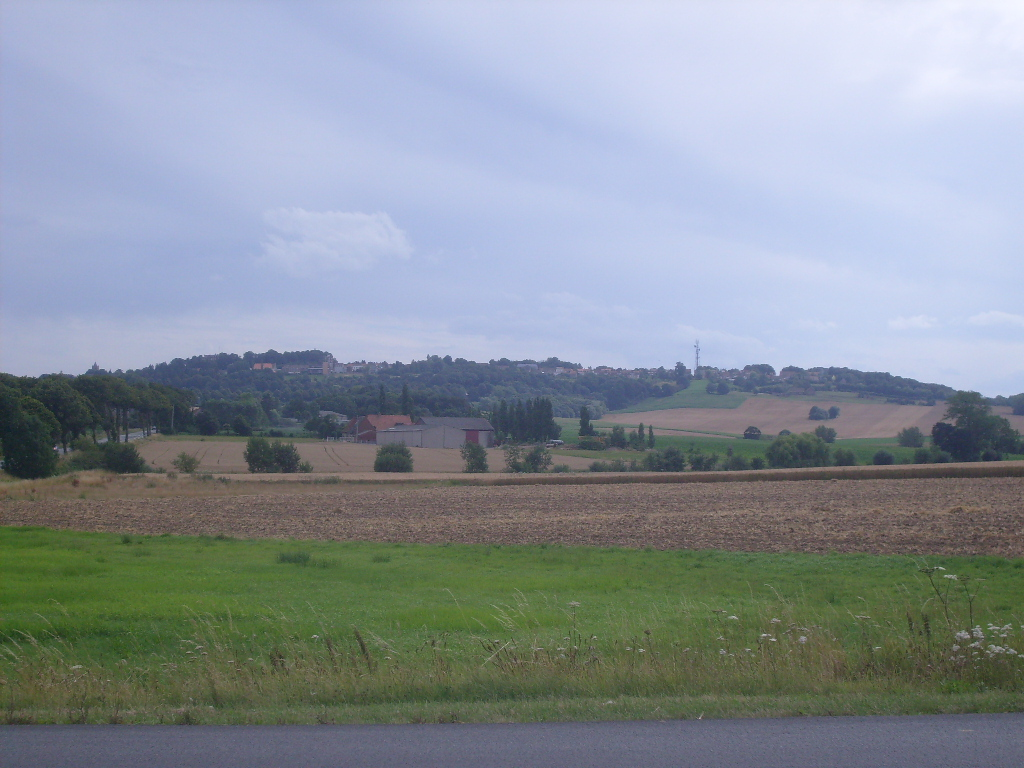
View from the north on Mont Cassel

In the first centuries A.D., Mont Cassel was close to an inlet of the North Sea, making the settlement vulnerable to attacks from sea. In 928 the town on top of the hill was destroyed by Viking raids.

By end of the 16th century Cassel had become a border town between France and the Spanish Netherlands. Cassel was annexed to France in 1678 under the terms of the Treaty of Nijmegen, which ended the Franco-Dutch War. The annexation led to the town's defences being dismantled. Mont Cassel was considered indefensible, as it was within easy firing range of the nearby Mont des Récollets, and it would have cost far too much to fortify both hills. In addition, without the proximity of the border, the town had lost its strategic significance.

During the early part of World War I Cassel served as the headquarters of Marshal Ferdinand Foch because of its strategic position near the northern end of the Western Front and to be closer to the Belgian headquarters at Veurne. From 1916-1918, Cassel was the headquarters for the British Second Army under Sir Herbert Plumer. The town avoided significant damage during the war, though it came under occasional shellfire when the Germans advanced to within 18 kilometres (11 mi) during the Battle of the Lys in April 1918.

== Cycling ==
Mont Cassel
- Location: Nord-Pas-de-Calais, France
- Start: Cassel, Nord
- Gain in altitude: 84 m (276 ft)
- Length of climb: 1.7 km (1.1 mi)
- Maximum elevation: 174 m (571 ft)
- Average gradient: 4.9 %
- Maximum gradient: 10 %

The hill is a regular climb in road bicycle races in spring. It is regularly included in the Four Days of Dunkirk stage race and Gent–Wevelgem classic, where it comes in the early stages of the race. It is also regularly included in the Tour de l'Eurométropole.

In 2014, it was included in the fourth stage of the Tour de France, coming halfway the course. Thomas Voeckler won the intermediate sprint on the top; Marcel Kittel won the stage in a bunch sprint.

The road leading up from the bottom of the hill to the top is 1,700 m. The upper kilometre has a cobbled surface. Unlike the fearful sections of pavé in Paris–Roubaix, the surface is in excellent condition, as it is one of only two roads leading to the commune of Cassel.

== Gallery ==
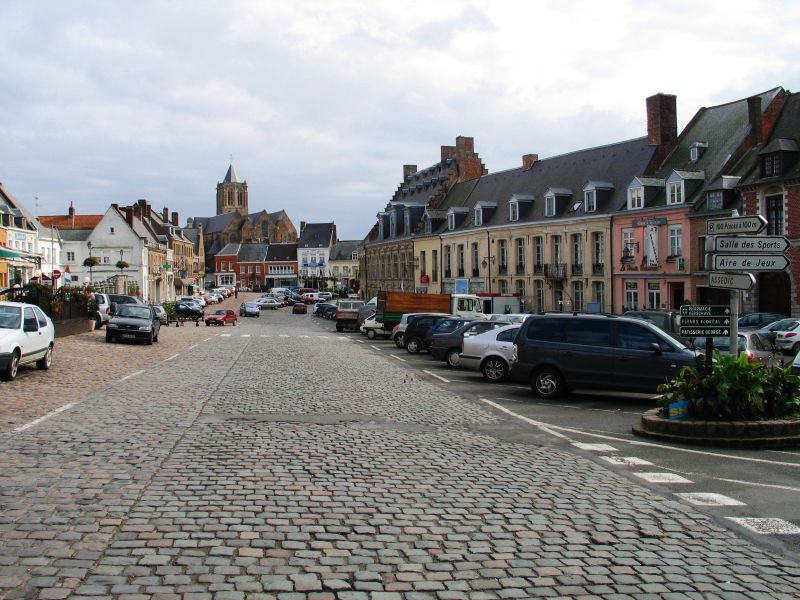

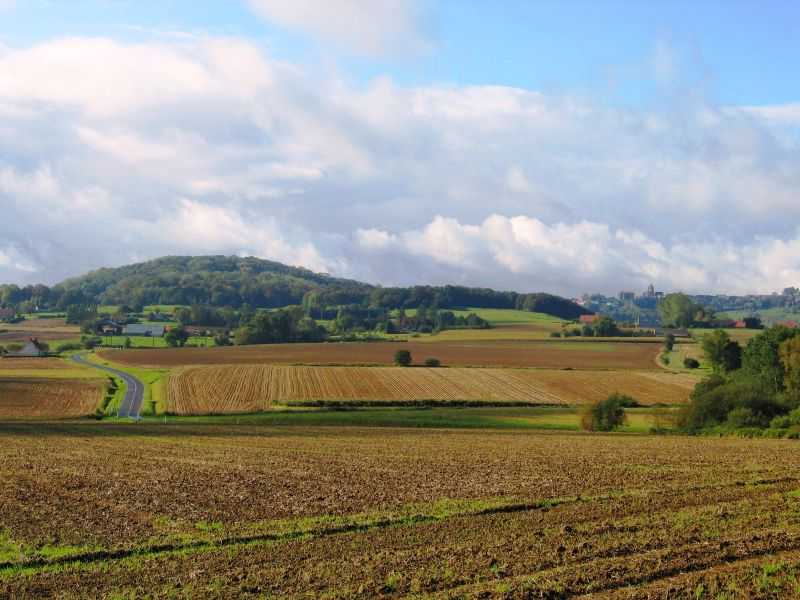

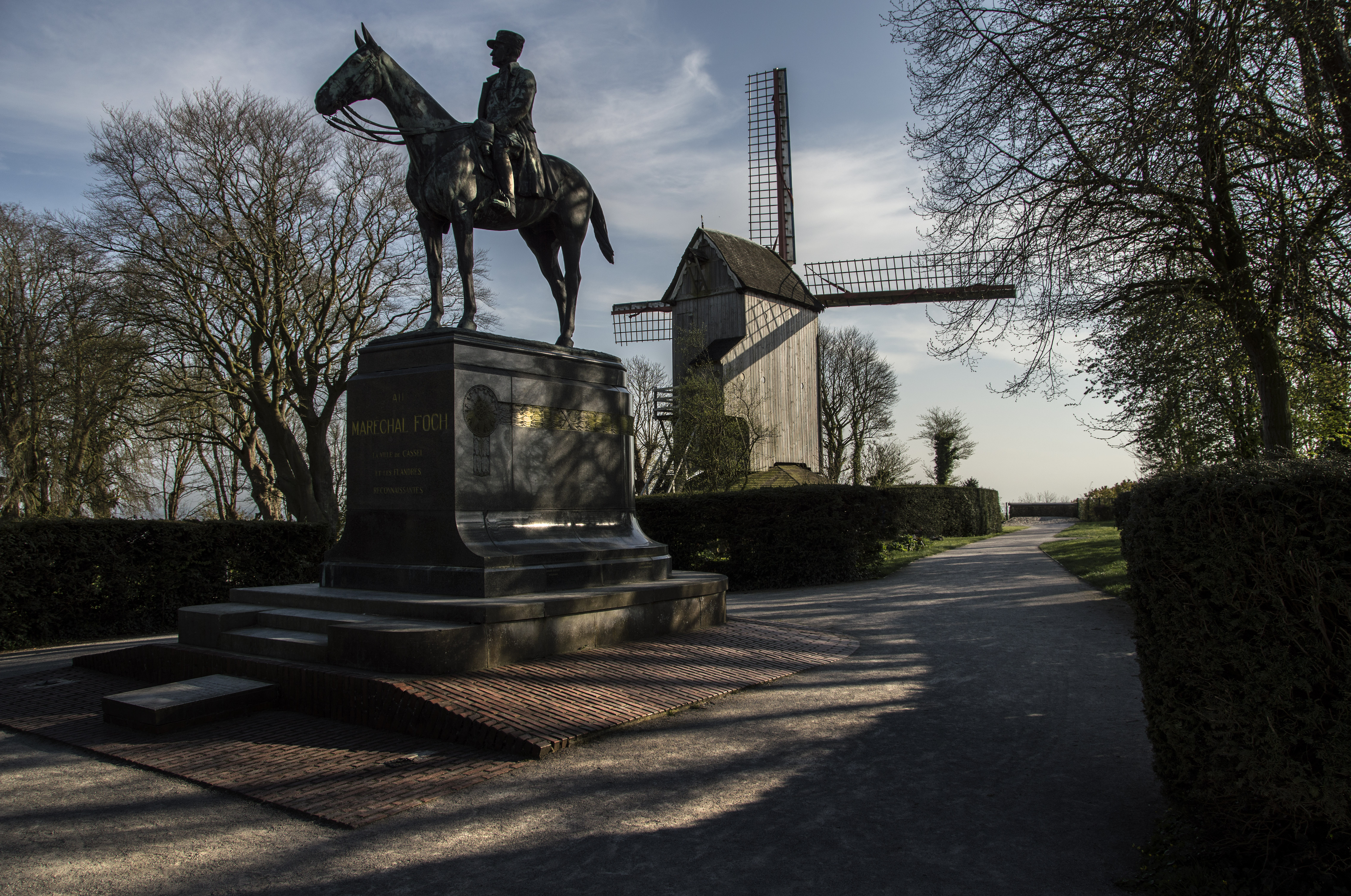

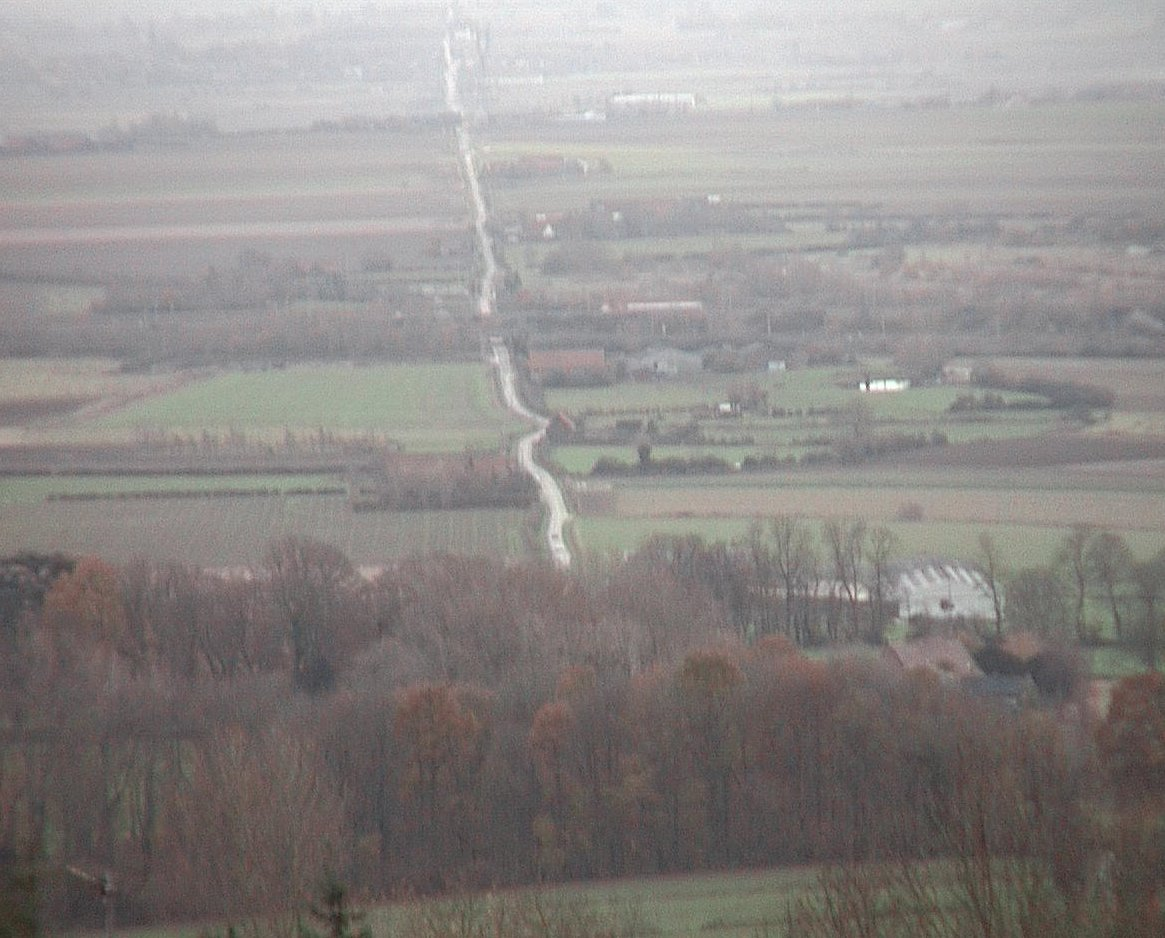
