= Robert Van Eenaeme =

Belgian cyclist (1916–1959)

- Van Eenaeme after winning 1937 Gent–Wevelgem

Personal information
- Born: 27 August 1916 Wondelgem, Belgium
- Died: 8 March 1959 (aged 42) Marche-en-Famenne, Belgium

Cycling career
- Sport: Cycling
- Discipline: Road
- Role: Rider

Professional teams
- 1936: Securitas
- 1937-38: Independent
- 1939: Armor
- 1940-42: Independent
- 1943: Europe-Dunlop
- 1944-45: Independent
- 1946: Métropole
- 1947: Groene Leeuw
- 1948: Independent
- 1949: Rochet
- 1949-50: Dossche Sport

Major wins
- One-day races and Classics Gent–Wevelgem (1936, 1937, 1945) Kampioenschap van Vlaanderen (1942) De Drie Zustersteden (1943)

Robert Van Eenaeme (27 August 1916 – 8 March 1959) was a Belgian cyclist.

He was a professional from 1939 to 1950. He won Ghent-Wevelgem in 1936 and 1937, when the race was reserved for riders in the "independent" category, and a third time in 1945, when it was opened up to professionals. With these three victories, he holds the record for most wins at Ghent-Wevelgem, along with Rik Van Looy, Eddy Merckx, Mario Cipollini, Tom Boonen and Peter Sagan.

He died at the age of 42 as a result of a traffic accident.

== Major results ==
1935
3rd Overall Circuit Franco-Belge
1936
1st Gent–Wevelgem
3rd Overall Circuit Franco-Belge
3rd Omloop der Vlaamse Gewesten Independents
1937
1st Gent–Wevelgem
8th Dr. Tistaertprijs Zottegem
1938
1st GP Victor Standaert Ninove
8th Dr. Tistaertprijs Zottegem
1939
1st GP Stekene (nl)
1941
4th Kampioenschap van Vlaanderen
1942
1st Kampioenschap van Vlaanderen
1st Overall Omloop van België

1st Stage 3b

3rd Tour of Flanders
6th Paris–Tours
1943
1st De Drie Zustersteden
2nd Dr. Tistaertprijs Zottegem
3rd Road race, National Road Championships
3rd Scheldeprijs
1944
8th Overall Omloop van België
1945
1st Gent–Wevelgem
3rd Omloop van Vlaanderen
4th Road race, National Road Championships
6th Grand Prix Jules Lowie Nokere
9th Tour of Flanders
1946
3rd Omloop van Oost-Vlaanderen
7th Omloop van het Houtland
9th Grand Prix Jules Lowie Nokere
10th Paris–Tours
