= 1945 Tour of Flanders =

Race details
- Dates: June 10, 1945
- Stages: 1
- Distance: 222 km (137.9 mi)
- Winning time: 6h 21' 00"

Results
	Winner	Sylvain Grysolle (BEL)
	Second	Albert Sercu (BEL)
	Third	Joseph Moerenhout (BEL)

The 29th edition of the Tour of Flanders cycling classic race was held on Sunday, 10 June 1945. Belgian Sylvain Grysolle won the Monument. Of the 91 starting cyclists, 31 reached the finish.

== Route ==
The race started in Ghent and covered 222 km (137.9 miles) on the way to the finish in Wetteren. The course featured 3 categorized climbs:

- Kwaremont
- Kruisberg
- Edelareberg

== Race report ==
A tough race thinned out the peloton and a leading group of 23 riders rode to the finish. Sylvain Grysolle jumped away and reached the finish line alone. Grysolle completed the race with an average of 34,96 km/h.

== General classification ==
=== Final general classification ===
Rank	Rider	Team	Time
1	Sylvain Grysolle (BEL)	Rochet–Dunlop	6h 21' 00"
2	Albert Sercu (BEL)	Dilecta–Wolber	+ 15"
3	Joseph Moerenhout (BEL)	Dilecta–Wolber	s.t.
4	Martin van den Broeck (BEL)	Individual	s.t.
5	Arthur Mommerency (BEL)	Individual	s.t.
6	Ward van Dijck (BEL)	Individual	s.t.
7	Eugeen Jacobs (BEL)	Individual	s.t.
8	Odiel van den Meersschaut (BEL)	Individual	s.t.
9	Robert Van Eenaeme (BEL)	Individual	s.t.
10	Emiel Faignaert (BEL)	Groene Leeuw	s.t.
