= Robert Wancour =

Belgian cyclist (1884–1976)

Personal information
- Nickname: The Giant of Wervik
- Born: 11 December 1884 Wervik, Belgium
- Died: 26 November 1976 (aged 91) Ligny, Belgium

Cycling career
- Sport: Cycling
- Discipline: Road
- Role: Rider

Professional teams
- 1906: BSA
- 1907–1908: Individual
- 1909: Depas Cycles
- 1910–1911: Individual

Robert Wancour (11 December 1884 – 26 November 1976) was a Belgian road cyclist.

== Biography ==
Wancour was born in Wervik, Belgium in 1884. He was a professional cyclist from 1906 to 1911. He a was nicknamed "The Giant of Wervik" (De Reus van Wervik) because of his unusual height of 1.85 m (6 ft 1 in). He was particularly successful in regional races. In 1907 he won 31 races, most of them in Wallonia, where he settled in Ligny after his marriage.

Wancour also competed in main international cycling classics. He had a podium finish at the 1907 Paris–Brussels and competed at the 1906 Tour de France.

He became the first winner of the Championship of Flanders in Koolskamp in 1908 beating Firmin Lambot who finished second. He successfully defended his title in 1909 winning ahead of Odile Defraye and Marcel Buysse.

Sportwereld wrote in 1933 why he never had a main international breakthrough: "Cyriel always drank water and never stayed up late. Robert never drank water and always stayed up late."

== Major results ==
1906
3rd Ougrée-Marche-Ougrée

1907
(bronze) Belgian National Road Championships
1st Ligny
1st Moustier
1st Monceau-sur-Sambre
1st Mons
1st Laken
1st Beyne-Heusay
1st Sombreffe
1st Keumiée
2nd Saint-Servais
2nd Keumiée
3rd Paris–Brussels

1908
1st Charleroi–Beaumont–Charleroi
1st Bierwart
(gold) Championship of Flanders
2nd Velaine-sur-Sambre
5th overall Tour of Belgium

2nd Stage 2

1909
(gold) Championship of Flanders

1910
1st La Louvière

1911
2nd Liège–Charleroi

=== Grand Tour and Classic results timeline ===
Race	1906	1907	1908	1909
Tour de France	DNF	—	—	—
Paris–Brussels	—	3	—	—
National Championships (road race)	—	3	—	—
Championship of Flanders	—	—	1	1
