= 1941 La Flèche Wallonne =

Race details
- Dates: 13 July 1941
- Stages: 1
- Distance: 205 km (127.4 mi)
- Winning time: 5h 22' 00"

Results
	Winner	Sylvain Grysolle (BEL)
	Second	Gustave Van Overloop (BEL)
	Third	Jacques Geus (BEL)

The 1941 La Flèche Wallonne was the fifth edition of La Flèche Wallonne cycle race and was held on 13 July 1941. The race started in Mons and finished in Rocourt. The race was won by Sylvain Grysolle.

== General classification ==
Final general classification

Rank	Rider	Time
1	Sylvain Grysolle (BEL)	5h 22' 00"
2	Gustave Van Overloop (BEL)	+ 26"
3	Jacques Geus (BEL)	+ 40"
4	Albert Ramon (BEL)	+ 40"
5	Martin Van Den Broeck (BEL)	+ 40"
6	Roger Vandendriessche (BEL)	+ 40"
7	Maurits Van Herzele (BEL)	+ 40"
8	Joseph Van Kerckhoven (BEL)	+ 40"
9	Albert Anciaux (BEL)	+ 40"
10	François Neuville (BEL)	+ 40"
