= Kampioenschap van Vlaanderen =

Belgian one-day road cycling race

Race details
- Date: Mid September
- Region: West Flanders, Belgium
- English name: Championship of Flanders
- Local name: Kampioenschap van Vlaanderen (in Dutch)
- Discipline: Road
- Competition: UCI Europe Tour
- Type: Single-day
- Web site: www.kampioenschapvanvlaanderen.be

History
- First edition: 1908
- Editions: 110 (as of 2026)
- First winner: Robert Wancour (BEL)
- Most wins: Niko Eeckhout (BEL) (4 wins)
- Most recent: Tim Merlier (BEL)

Kampioenschap van Vlaanderen (Championship of Flanders) or Koolskamp Koerse is a single-day road bicycle race held annually in September in Koolskamp (part-municipality of Ardooie), West Flanders, Belgium. Since 2005, the race is organized as a 1.1 event on the UCI Europe Tour.

The traditional yellow winner's jersey with the black lion, based on the flag of Flanders.

== Winners ==
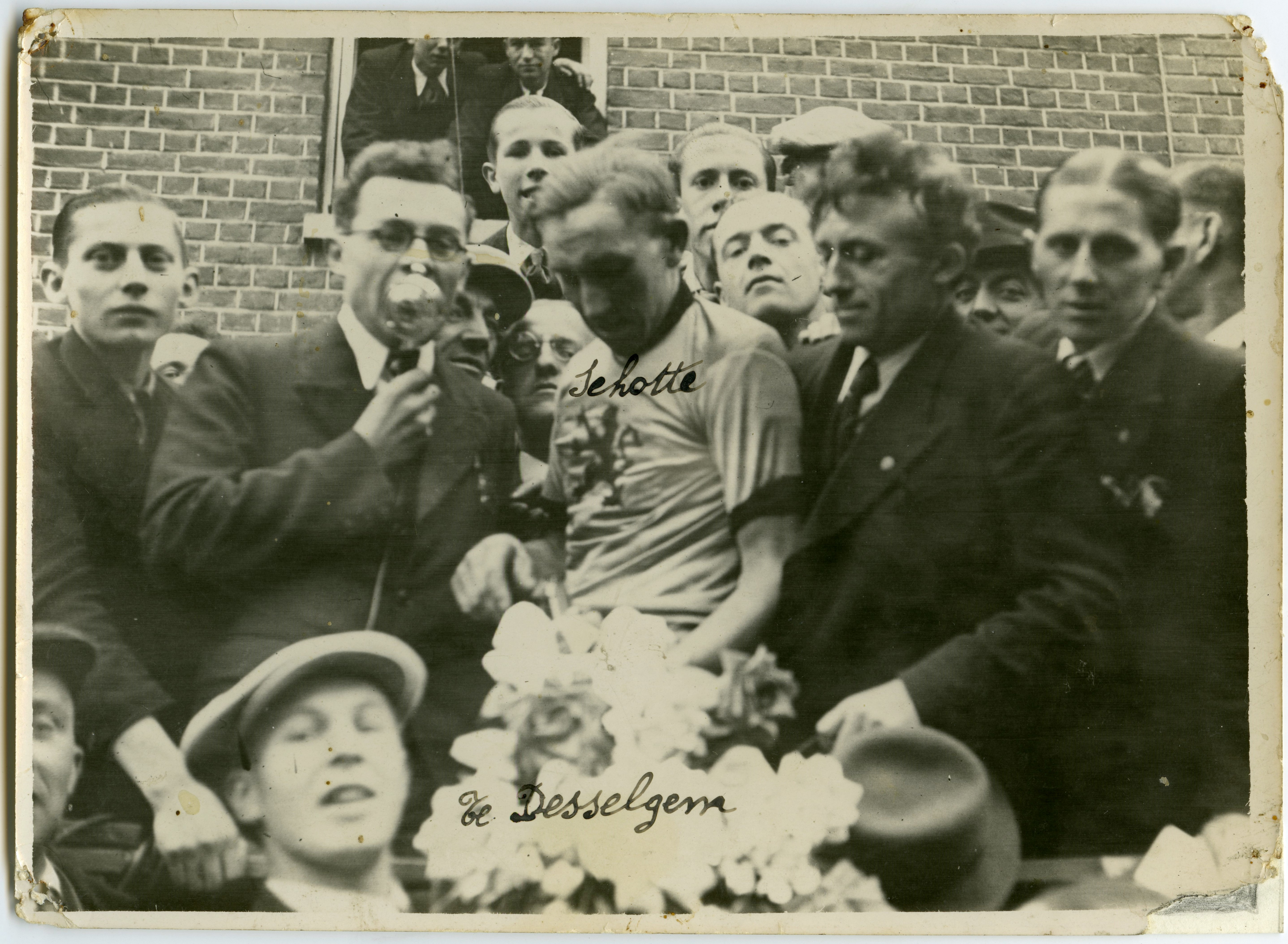
Briek Schotte won the 1941 edition.

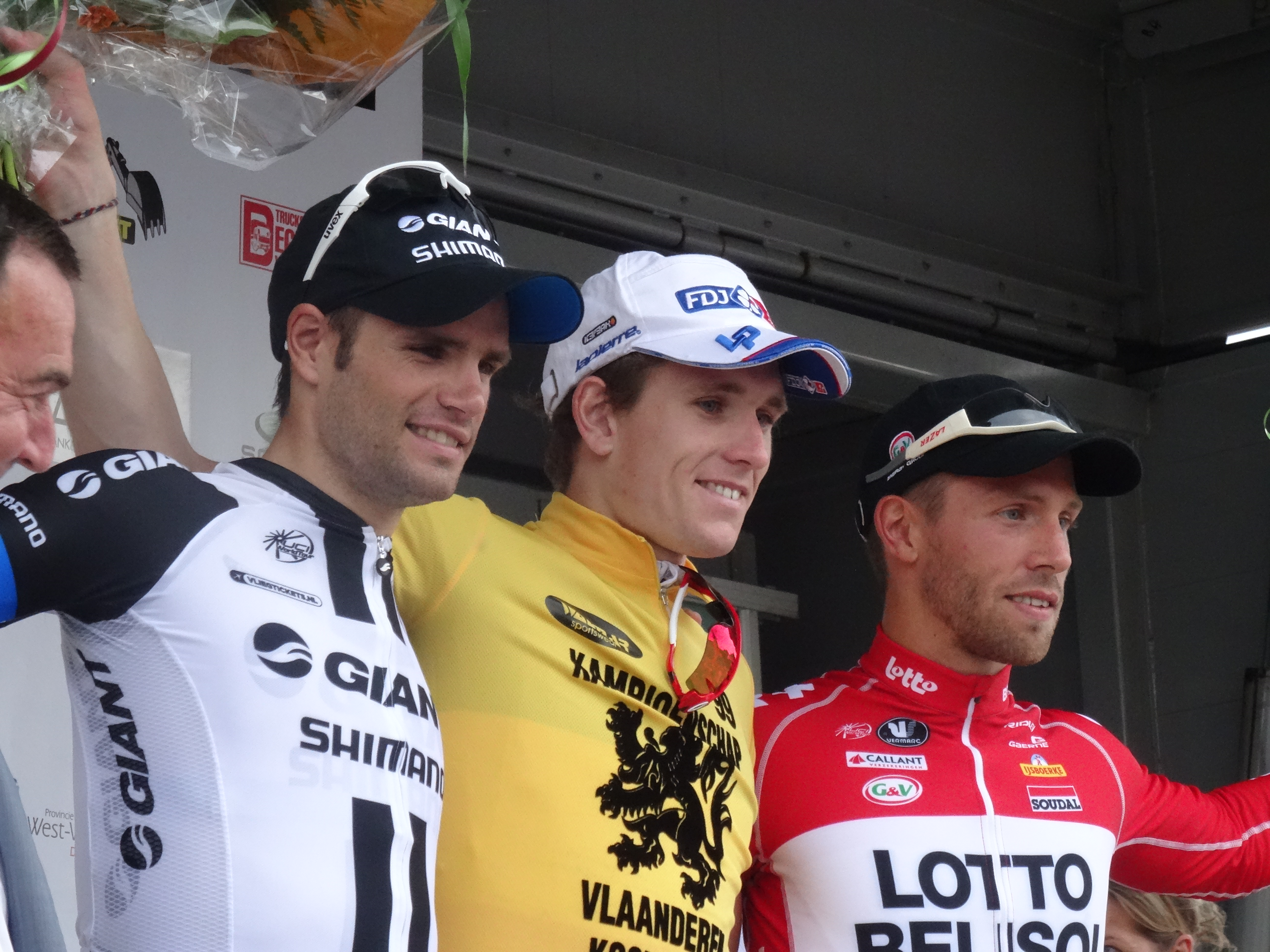
2014 : Luka Mezgec (2), Arnaud Démare (1) & Jonas Van Genechten (3).

| Year | Country | Rider | Team |
|---|---|---|---|
| 1908 | Belgium | Robert Wancour | |
| 1909 | Belgium | Robert Wancour | |
| 1910 | Belgium | Odile Defraye | |
| 1911 | Belgium | Leon Buysse | |
| 1912 | Belgium | Abel De Vogelaere | |
| 1913 | Belgium | René Anno | |
| 1914- 1918 | No race | | |
| 1919 | Belgium | Jules Van Hevel | |
| 1920 | Belgium | Jules Van Hevel | |
| 1921 | Belgium | Pierre Vandevelde | |
| 1922 | Belgium | Alfons Van Hecke | |
| 1923 | Belgium | Julien Volbrecht | |
| 1924 | Belgium | Léon Devos | |
| 1925 | Belgium | Aimé Dossche | |
| 1926 | Belgium | Henri De Jaegher | |
| 1927 | Belgium | Léopold-Albert Matton | |
| 1928 | Belgium | Aimé Dossche | |
| 1929 | Belgium | Maurits Raes | |
| 1930 | Belgium | Alfred Haemerlinck | |
| 1931 | Belgium | Aimé Dossche | |
| 1932 | Belgium | Gerard Desmet | |
| 1933 | Belgium | Gerard Desmet | |
| 1934 | Belgium | Constant Van Impe | |
| 1935 | Belgium | Marcel Kint | |
| 1936 | Belgium | Julien Heernaert | |
| 1937 | Belgium | Marcel Claeys | |
| 1938 | Belgium | Sylvain Grysolle | |
| 1939- 1940 | No race | | |
| 1941 | Belgium | Briek Schotte | |
| 1942 | Belgium | Robert Van Eenaeme | |
| 1943 | Belgium | Rik Van Steenbergen | |
| 1944 | No race | | |
| 1945 | Belgium | Sylvain Grysolle | |
| 1946 | Belgium | Achiel De Backer | |
| 1947 | Belgium | Albert Paepe | |
| 1948 | Belgium | Emmanuel Thoma | |
| 1949 | Belgium | Emile Van Der Veken | |
| 1950 | Belgium | Maurice Blomme | |
| 1951 | Belgium | Roger Decock | |
| 1952 | Belgium | Arsène Rijckaert | |
| 1953 | Belgium | Leon Delathouwer | |
| 1954 | Belgium | Briek Schotte | |
| 1955 | Belgium | Leon Delathouwer | |
| 1956 | Belgium | Léon Vandaele | |
| 1957 | Belgium | Léon Vandaele | |
| 1958 | Belgium | Léon Vandaele | |
| 1959 | Belgium | Rik Van Looy | |
| 1960 | Belgium | Gilbert Desmet | |
| 1961 | Belgium | Frans Demulder | |
| 1962 | Belgium | André Messelis | |
| 1963 | Belgium | Gustave Van Vaerenbergh | |
| 1964 | Belgium | Gustaaf Desmet | |
| 1965 | Denmark | Palle Lykke Jensen | |
| 1966 | Belgium | Eddy Merckx | |
| 1967 | Netherlands | Gerard Vianen | |
| 1968 | Belgium | Jos Huysmans | |
| 1969 | Belgium | Eric De Vlaeminck | |
| 1970 | Belgium | Noël Van Clooster | |
| 1971 | Belgium | Eric Leman | |
| 1972 | Belgium | Patrick Sercu | |
| 1973 | Belgium | Herman Vrijders | |
| 1974 | Belgium | Freddy Maertens | |
| 1975 | Belgium | Jos Huysmans | |
| 1976 | Belgium | Freddy Maertens | |
| 1977 | Belgium | Frans Verhaegen | |
| 1978 | Belgium | Daniel Willems | |
| 1979 | Netherlands | Fons van Katwijk | |
| 1980 | Netherlands | Theo de Rooy | |
| 1981 | Belgium | Patrick Versluys | |
| 1982 | Belgium | Gery Verlinden | |
| 1983 | Belgium | Patrick Devos | |
| 1984 | Belgium | Rudy Matthijs | |
| 1985 | Belgium | Eddy Vanhaerens | |
| 1986 | Belgium | Frank Van De Vijver | |
| 1987 | Belgium | Dirk Heirweg | |
| 1988 | Belgium | Marnix Lameire | |
| 1989 | Belgium | Etienne De Wilde | |
| 1990 | Belgium | Hendrik Redant | |
| 1991 | Belgium | Johan Museeuw | |
| 1992 | Belgium | Rik Van Slycke | |
| 1993 | Belgium | Sammie Moreels | |
| 1994 | Netherlands | Jelle Nijdam | |
| 1995 | Belgium | Johan Museeuw | |
| 1996 | Belgium | Nico Eeckhout | |
| 1997 | Belgium | Peter Van Petegem | |
| 1998 | Belgium | Nico Eeckhout | |
| 1999 | Belgium | Michel Vanhaecke | |
| 2000 | Belgium | Nico Eeckhout | |
| 2001 | Belgium | Paul Van Hyfte | CSC–Tiscali |
| 2002 | France | Jimmy Casper | Française des Jeux |
| 2003 | Australia | Baden Cooke | FDJeux.com |
| 2004 | France | Jimmy Casper | Cofidis |
| 2005 | Uzbekistan | Sergey Lagutin | Landbouwkrediet–Colnago |
| 2006 | Belgium | Nico Eeckhout | Chocolade Jacques–Topsport Vlaanderen |
| 2007 | Australia | Baden Cooke | Unibet.com |
| 2008 | Germany | André Greipel | Team Columbia |
| 2009 | Netherlands | Steven de Jongh | Quick-Step |
| 2010 | Australia | Leigh Howard | Team HTC–Columbia |
| 2011 | Germany | Marcel Kittel | Skil–Shimano |
| 2012 | Netherlands | Ronan van Zandbeek | Argos–Shimano |
| 2013 | Belgium | Jens Debusschere | Lotto–Belisol |
| 2014 | France | Arnaud Démare | FDJ.fr |
| 2015 | Poland | Michał Gołaś (Note: In 2015, Jens Debusschere crossed the line first but was relegated to sixth place after the race jury decided that he had veered from his line, causing Dylan Groenewegen to crash.) | Etixx–Quick-Step |
| 2016 | Belgium | Timothy Dupont | Verandas Willems |
| 2017 | Colombia | Fernando Gaviria | Quick-Step Floors |
| 2018 | Netherlands | Dylan Groenewegen | LottoNL–Jumbo |
| 2019 | Germany | Jannik Steimle | Deceuninck–Quick-Step |
| 2020 | No race due to the COVID-19 pandemic | | |
| 2021 | Belgium | Jasper Philipsen | Alpecin–Fenix |
| 2022 | Netherlands | Fabio Jakobsen | Quick-Step Alpha Vinyl Team |
| 2023 | Belgium | Jasper Philipsen | Alpecin–Deceuninck |
| 2024 | Belgium | Tim Merlier | Soudal–Quick-Step |
| 2025 | Italy | Jonathan Milan | Lidl–Trek |
| 2026 | Belgium | Tim Merlier | Soudal–Quick-Step |
