= 1939 Liège–Bastogne–Liège =

Race details
- Dates: 14 May 1939
- Stages: 1
- Distance: 211 km (131 mi)
- Winning time: 5h 39' 00"

Results
	Winner	Albert Ritserveldt (BEL)
	Second	Cyrille Van Overberghe (BEL)
	Third	Edward Vissers (BEL)

The 1939 Liège–Bastogne–Liège was the 29th edition of the Liège–Bastogne–Liège cycle race and was held on 14 May 1939. The race started and finished in Liège. The race was won by Albert Ritserveldt.

== General classification ==
Final general classification

Rank	Rider	Time
1	Albert Ritserveldt (BEL)	5h 39' 00"
2	Cyrille Van Overberghe (BEL)	+ 34"
3	Edward Vissers (BEL)	+ 59"
4	Camille Beeckman (BEL)	+ 59"
5	Maurice Clautier (BEL)	+ 3' 03"
6	Joseph Somers (BEL)	+ 3' 03"
7	Joseph Van Kerckhoven (BEL)	+ 4' 31"
8	Jérôme Dufromont (BEL)	+ 7' 12"
9	Achiel De Backer (BEL)	+ 7' 12"
10	Sylvain Grysolle (BEL)	+ 7' 12"
