= Gent–Wevelgem =

Belgian one-day road cycling race

In Flanders Fields From Middelkerke to Wevelgem

Race details
- Date: Late March
- Region: Flanders, Belgium
- English name: Ghent-Wevelgem
- Local name: Gent–Wevelgem (in Dutch)
- Nickname(s): The Wind Classic; The Echelon Race
- Discipline: Road
- Competition: UCI World Tour; UCI Women's World Tour
- Type: One-day
- Organiser: Flanders Classics
- Race director: Luc Gheysens
- Web site: www.gent-wevelgem.be

Men's history
- First edition: 1934
- Editions: 88 (as of 2026)
- First winner: Gustave Van Belle (BEL)
- Most wins: Robert Van Eenaeme (BEL); Rik Van Looy (BEL); Eddy Merckx (BEL); Mario Cipollini (ITA); Tom Boonen (BEL); Peter Sagan (SVK); Mads Pedersen (DEN) (3 wins each)
- Most recent: Jasper Philipsen (BEL)

Women's history
- First edition: 2012
- Editions: 15 (as of 2026)
- First winner: Lizzie Armitstead (GBR)
- Most wins: Lorena Wiebes (NED) (3 wins)
- Most recent: Lorena Wiebes (NED)

Gent–Wevelgem, and from 2026 officially In Flanders Fields - From Middelkerke to Wevelgem, is a road cycling race in Belgium, held almost annually since 1934. It is one of the classic races part of the Flemish Cycling Week, run in late March on the last Sunday before the Tour of Flanders.

Although the event is often called a sprinters' classic due to its flat finishing terrain, its early-season date means riders are often tested by wind and rain, as well as several climbs, including two ascents of the steep and fully cobbled Kemmelberg. As a result, few editions of Gent–Wevelgem actually end in a bunch sprint; often the winner comes from a small group of escapees.

In 2005 the race was included in the inaugural UCI ProTour and in 2011 in its successor, the UCI World Tour. Since 2011 it is organized by Flanders Classics, which also organizes the Tour of Flanders. Since 2012 a woman's event is held on the same day as the men's race, included in the inaugural UCI Women's World Tour in 2016.

Seven riders share the record of victories. Belgians Robert Van Eenaeme, Rik Van Looy, Eddy Merckx and Tom Boonen, Italian Mario Cipollini, Slovak Peter Sagan and Dane Mads Pedersen each won the race three times. Sagan also achieved a record six podium finishes in the race.

== History ==
=== Amateur event ===
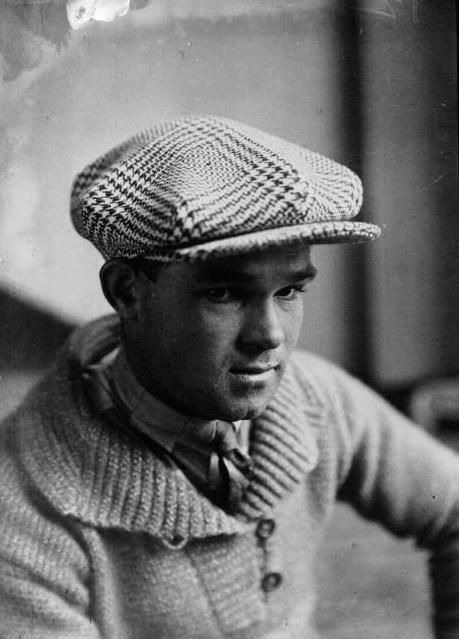
The event was created in honour of Gaston Rebry, although he never participated.

Created in 1934 and originally run by the newspaper Gazet van Antwerpen, the race's finish town of Wevelgem was selected because it was the home town of the event's first owner, local textile manufacturer Georges Matthijs. (Note: The start location of Ghent was a logical economic choice. The city was home to several flax factories who traded with the many textile manufacturers in Wevelgem.) Its origin is a tribute to Gaston Rebry, a native of Wevelgem, who was one of the stars of cycling in Belgium in the 1930s.

The first edition was run on 9 September 1934 as an amateur race on a flat, 120 km route. The race only had Belgian participants and was won by Gustave Van Belle. (Note: Van Belle died in 1954 when he tried to save his seven-year old son who had fallen in the Leie river in Ghent.) In 1936 the race distance was increased to 168 km and Robert Van Eenaeme was the first professional winner.

=== Spring classic ===
The event had its only interruptions during World War II, and was subsequently organized again as a professional event in 1945. Gaston Rebry, by then president of bike club "Het Vliegend Wiel", was the new race director. Robert Van Eenaeme was declared winner of the first post-War edition, surprisingly ten days after the race was over, after officials had closely inspected the photo finish.

In 1947 Gent–Wevelgem was granted a springtime date on the calendar and gained prestige. Organizer Rebry managed to line up Italian cycling icons Gino Bartali and Fausto Coppi, who attracted vast numbers of spectators to the race.

In 1957 the race became part of the short-lived Trophy of Flanders, a two-day formula with the Omloop Het Volk, in which Gent–Wevelgem was raced on Saturday, the Omloop on Sunday. In the 1960s the race garnered international prestige. Belgian cycling legends Rik Van Looy and Eddy Merckx won the race three times; Tour de France winner Jacques Anquetil was the first French winner in 1964.

The race was in a constant search of identity and re-invention, as reflected in the regular route and calendar changes. In 1977 the distance was 277 km, the longest edition ever, featuring eleven climbs in the Flemish Ardennes and a double ascent of the Kemmelberg. The arduous edition was won by Bernard Hinault, claiming his first international success.

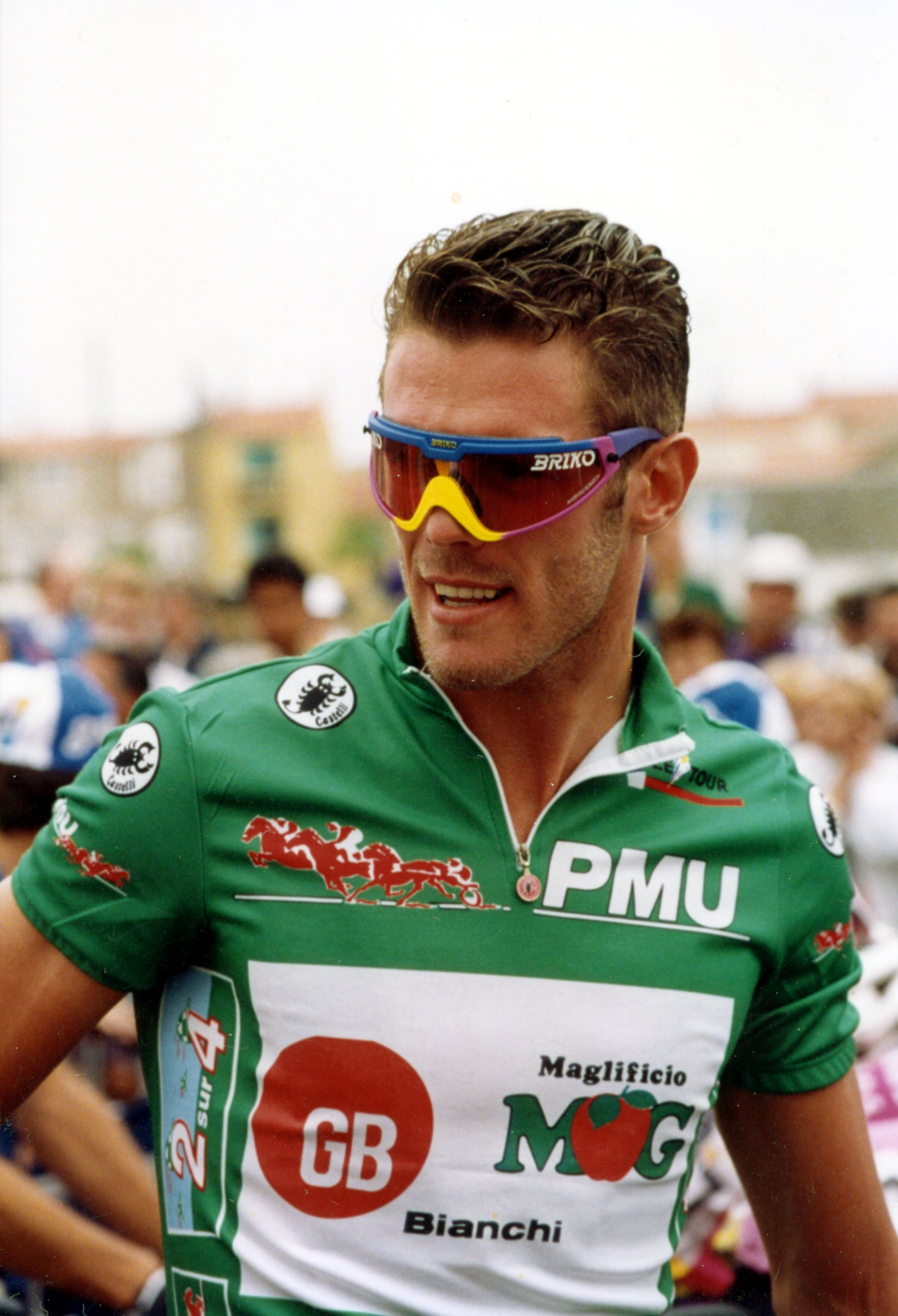
Italian sprint star Mario Cipollini is one of seven riders who won the race three times.

=== In Flanders Fields Classic ===
Since the 1980s the race has built a reputation as a sprinters' classic. Italian sprint star Mario Cipollini claimed three victories. Sean Kelly, Guido Bontempi, Djamolidine Abdoujaparov and Tom Steels are some of the other sprint specialists on the roll of honour.

In 2003, Gent–Wevelgem abandoned its original start location Ghent and moved to suburban Deinze. Tom Boonen claimed his first classic victory in 2004, later proceeding to equal the winning record of three wins. For many decades, the race held a mid-week position between the Tour of Flanders and Paris–Roubaix. In 2011, the race was included in the UCI World Tour and returned to a Sunday date in the weekend between Milan–San Remo and the Tour of Flanders. (Note: The slot formerly held by the Brabantse Pijl.)

Since 2015, the event is named Gent–Wevelgem – In Flanders Fields, after the iconic war poem by John McCrae. Organizers wanted to commemorate the 100th anniversary of World War I, as the Westhoek region was at the heart of the war and is home to several Commonwealth war graves. The 2015 edition was won by Luca Paolini, but was particularly memorable as it was run in abysmal weather, with strong winds scourging the peloton. Several riders were blown violently off their bikes, including Geraint Thomas when he was leading the breakaway group, prompting media to describe the race as "mayhem" and "one of the wildest bike races in recent years". Only 39 riders finished the race.

The 2016 edition was marred by the death of Belgian rider Antoine Demoitié, suffering fatal injuries from a crash and collision with a motor bike. Peter Sagan won the 2018 event, his third Gent–Wevelgem title and sixth podium finish, which made him the most successful rider in the race's history.

Gent–Wevelgem logo

At the end of 2025, more than 90 years after its inception, it was decided to rename the Gent–Wevelgem race completely to In Flanders Fields (From Middelkerke to Wevelgem). The coastal town of Middelkerke is set to be in the spotlight as a tourist destination over the next 10 years.

== Route ==
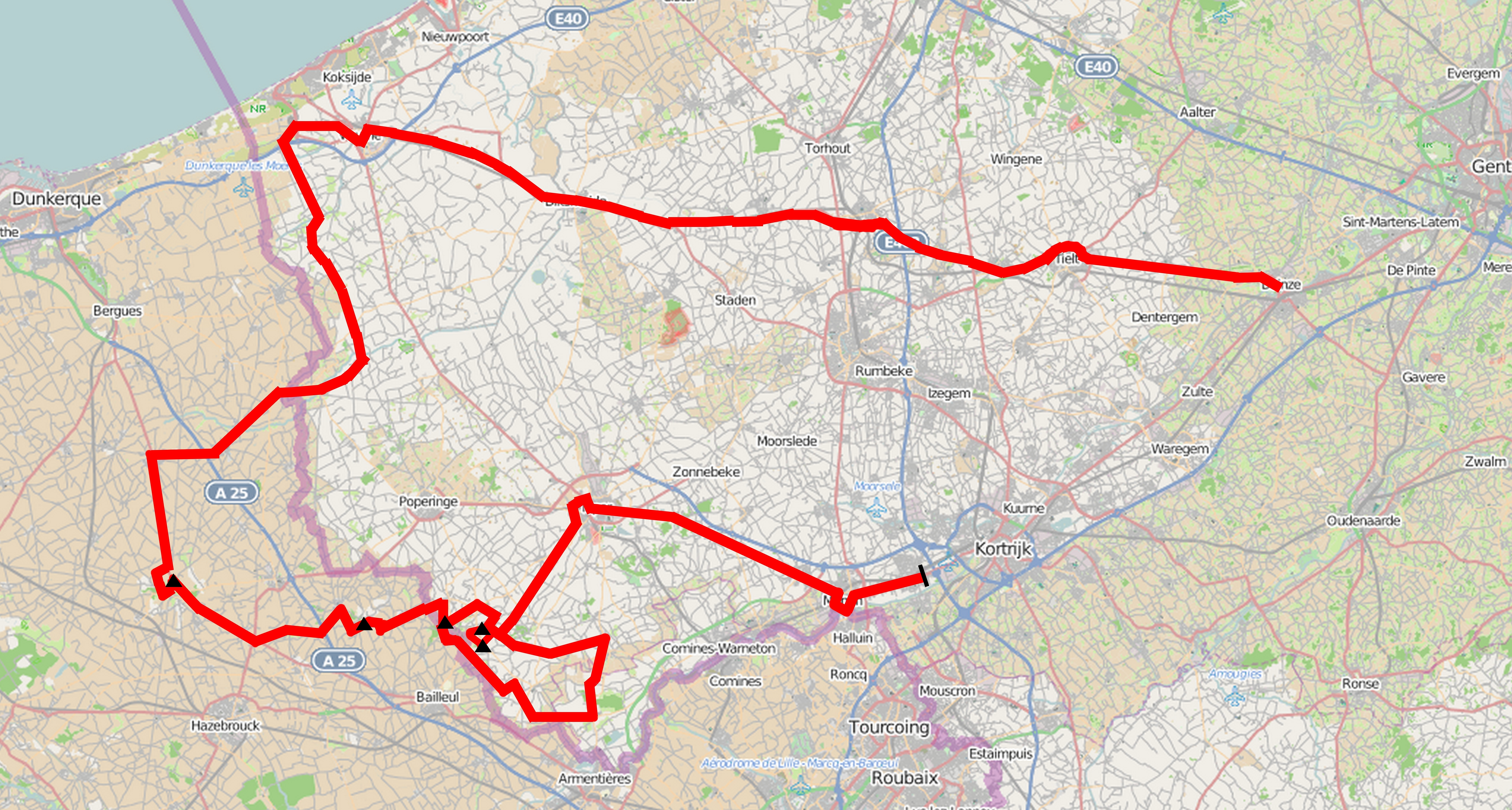
Route map of the 2014 Gent–Wevelgem: Starting in Deinze and finishing in Wevelgem, the race covers around 250 km

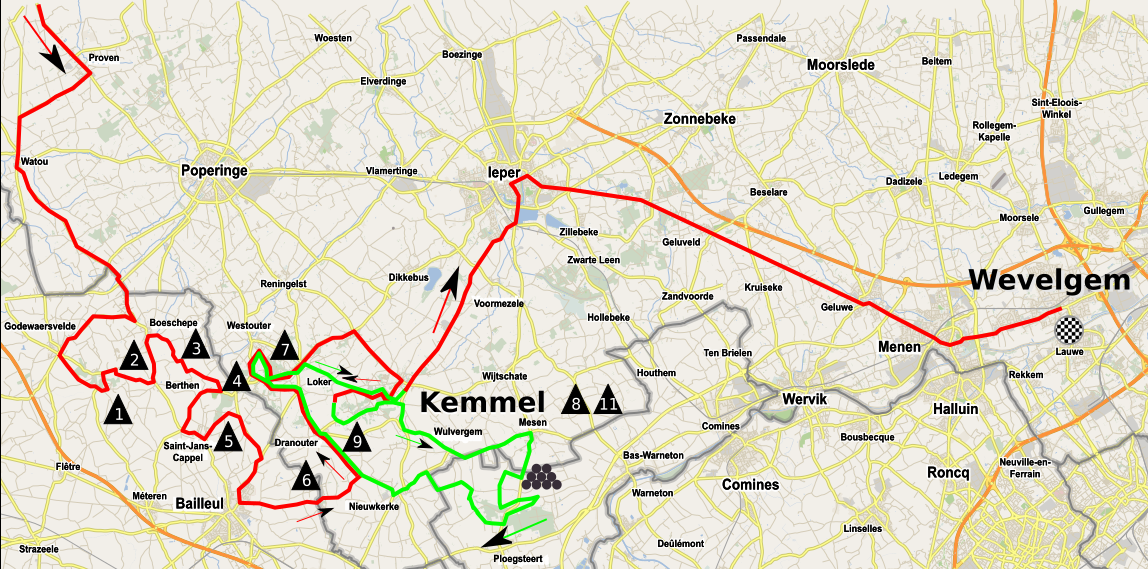
Final 100 km of the 2018 event

Unlike most of the Flemish spring classics, which centre around Oudenaarde and the plentiful hills in the Flemish Ardennes, Gent–Wevelgem travels west into West Flanders and Northern France and has fewer hills, providing it with a different character and making it more suitable for sprinters. In recent years the total distance of the race was around 250 km.

=== Present course ===
Since 2004, the race starts in Deinze, East Flanders, 15 kilometres (9.3 mi) southwest of Ghent. After the unofficial start on the city's Market Square, the route heads west, facing 100 kilometres through the wind-swept flatlands of West Flanders, up to and along the North Sea coast before turning south into the North department of France. After 120 km comes the cobbled Kasselberg climb in Cassel, which is addressed twice in quick succession. (Note: In 2016 and 2017 Gent–Wevelgem did not include the Casselberg because of the annual Easter carnival in the commune that coincided with the race.) After the Katsberg, the second hill in France, the race re-enters Belgium after 50 kilometres (31 mi) on French roads, with the key section of the race in Heuvelland.

The hill zone in the very south of West Flanders has three climbs, the Baneberg, Monteberg and Kemmelberg, covered within twelve kilometres of one another. This succession of climbs is interspersed with technical descents along narrow country roads, including the difficult descent of the Kemmelberg, the hardest and most iconic climb of the race.

After these three climbs the course loops round and riders re-ascend the Baneberg–Monteberg-Kemmelberg sequence, covering a total of nine categorized climbs. After the top of the ultimate climb of the Kemmelberg, some 35 kilometres (22 mi) from the finish, the course invariably ensues on a long and flat run-in to Wevelgem. The finish is on the Vanackerestraat, Wevelgem's central avenue.

=== Character of the race ===
The essential ingredients of Gent–Wevelgem have remained the same for decades. First to take their toll on the peloton, in the opening 100 kilometres, are the crosswinds and often rainy weather on exposed, flat roads across Flanders’ largest open plain. As teams try to protect and position their captains in the early stages of the race, splits and echelons at this point frequently see 40 to 60 riders eliminated from the running.

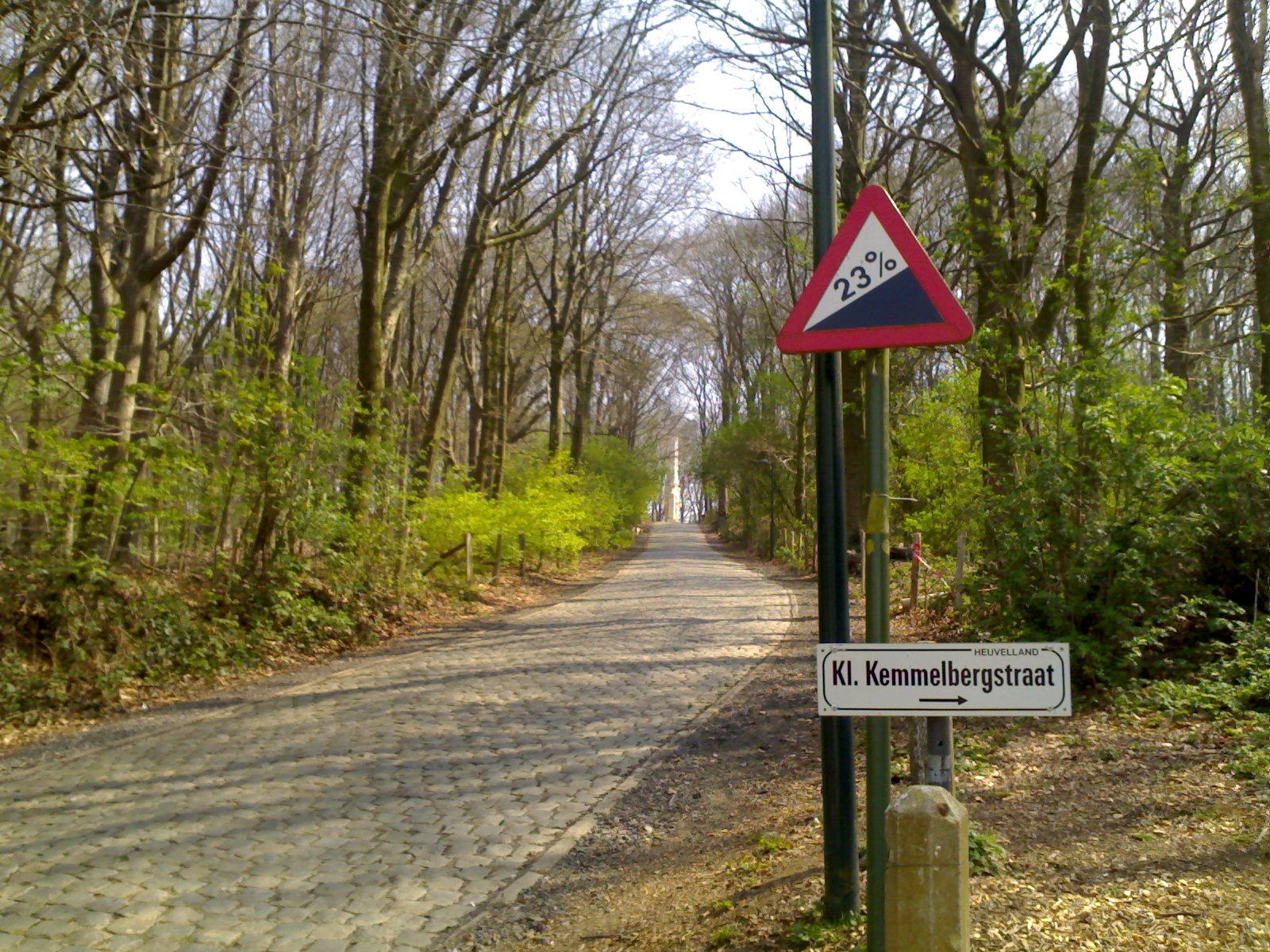
The Kemmelberg first featured in 1955 and has become the centrepiece of the race. The steepest slopes reach 23 % gradient near the top.

Subsequently, after hours of pounding across the Flanders flatlands and the occasional excursion to Northern France, the riders approach the hill zone in Heuvelland, which features the day's most difficult ascents. The hills are at the heart of the action and usually the sites where breakaways are formed. The race's most renowned climb is the Kemmelberg, a fully cobbled hill road in Kemmel with gradients up to 23%, but equally notorious for its difficult and technical descent.

The Kemmelberg, the highest point in the region, is the toughest climb and the emotional centrepiece of the race. Named after Camulos, the Celtic god of war, the Kemmelberg's summit lies atop a thickly wooded ridge which was the scene of the Battle of the Lys in April 1918, in which more than 200,000 soldiers died. The climb has been controversial in the past because of several severe crashes in its descent. In 2007 French rider Jimmy Casper crashed heavily, suffering numerous facial and other fractures. In 2016 the climb was addressed by its steepest road for the first time in more than 20 years.

After the Kemmelberg, the ultimate battle between breakaways formed on the climbs and the chasing peloton unfolds on the 35-kilometre flat roads towards the finish. Despite its reputation as a sprinter's classic, Gent–Wevelgem's breakaways frequently hold off their pursuers because of the unpredictable terrain.

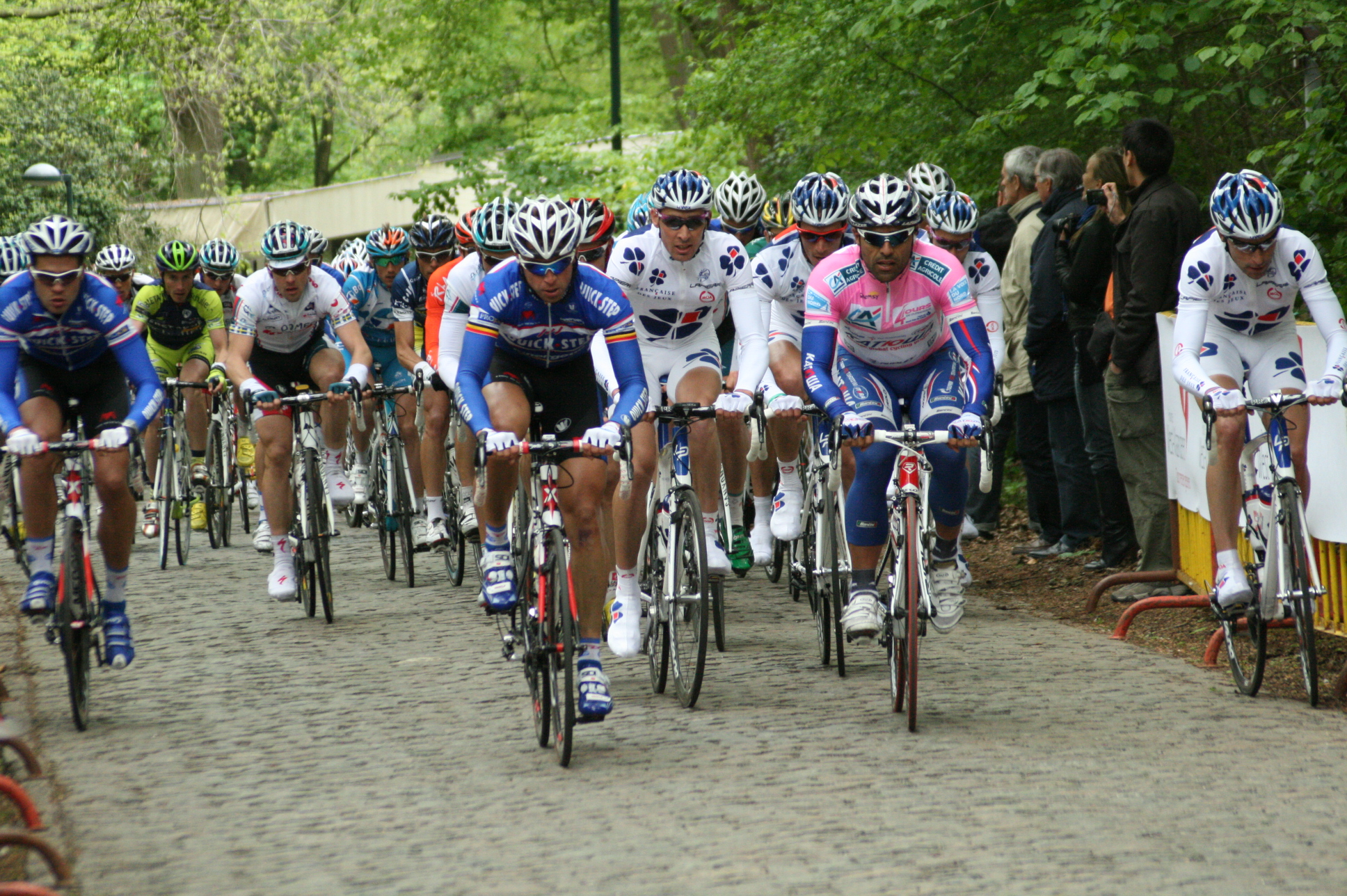
The Kemmelberg is one of the only cobbled sites in the race.

=== Cobbles ===
Although media usually classify Gent–Wevelgem as a cobbled classic, the route actually has very few sections of cobbled roads. Only the Kemmelberg and the upper stretches of the Kasselberg are cobbled, totaling a possible maximum of two kilometres of cobbled section, which is significantly less than the other cobbled races of Flanders and Northern France. Moreover, there are no flat sections of pavé and both cobbled climbs are in excellent condition, as they are part of a busy suburban traffic network.

== Course changes ==
The first race was in 1934 on an all-flat route from Ghent's St Pieter's Station to Wevelgem. The second edition in 1935 addressed the Flemish Ardennes in East Flanders and included the climbs of Kwaremont, Kluisberg and Tiegemberg. From 1936 to 1939 the race ran from Ghent to Kortrijk, followed by local laps, including the Lauwberg as the main difficulty.

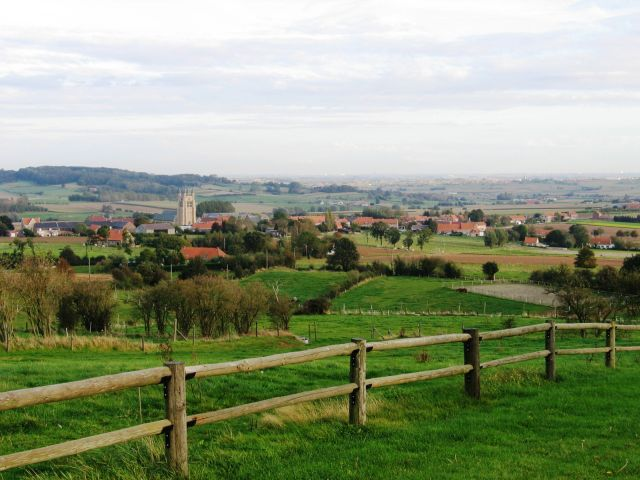
Since 1945, the hills in Heuvelland, including Kemmelberg and Rodeberg (pictured) are the heart of the finale.

After World War II, Gent–Wevelgem restyled with a new route across the Flemish Ardennes and the Heuvelland region. The Edelareberg, Hoppeberg, Kwaremont, Zwarteberg and Rodeberg featured along the way. In 1947 and 1948 the course looped up to and along the North Sea coast for the first time.

From 1949 to 1954 the Flemish Ardennes returned, followed by the Heuvelland hills of Rodeberg and Vidaigneberg. In 1955 the Kluisberg and Kemmelberg made their first appearance. The road on the Kemmelberg was still unpaved. In 1956 the Eikenberg was included.

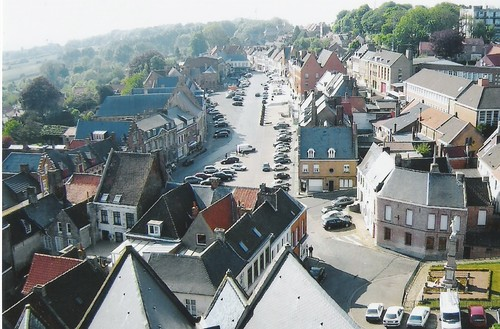
Mont Cassel is one of the Franco-Flemish hills in Northern France, introduced in 1957.

In 1957, as Gent–Wevelgem was part of the Trophy of Flanders, organizers introduced climbs in French Flanders: Zwarteberg, Mont Cassel, Katsberg and Wouwenberg preceded the Kemmelberg. In 1958, these Franco-Flemish climbs were not included: the pre-Schengen border crossing caused too many administrative burdens. After the run-up to the coast, the route featured only the Rodeberg, Vidaigneberg and Kemmelberg climbs in Heuvelland.

In 1960 scheduling conflicts marked the end of the Trophy of Flanders and the race placed itself on the calendar between the more prestigious classics the Tour of Flanders and Paris–Roubaix. In 1961 Gent–Wevelgem implemented a two-day course, a one-year novelty. The race ran from Ghent to Antwerp on the first day and to Wevelgem on the second.

From 1962 to 1976 Gent–Wevelgem ran via the coast to Heuvelland, with the Rodeberg, Vidaigneberg and Kemmelberg as fixed venues, sometimes supplemented with Monteberg, Baneberg, Sulferberg, Goeberg, Suikerberg (Sugar Hill), Kraaiberg and Scherpenberg.

In 1977, the hills of the Flemish Ardennes were addressed for the last time to date, featuring eleven significant climbs, including Koppenberg, Edelareberg, Kattenberg, Varent, Kluisberg and Tiegemberg. In 1993, the Franco-Flemish hills made their re-appearance but were omitted again in 1996.

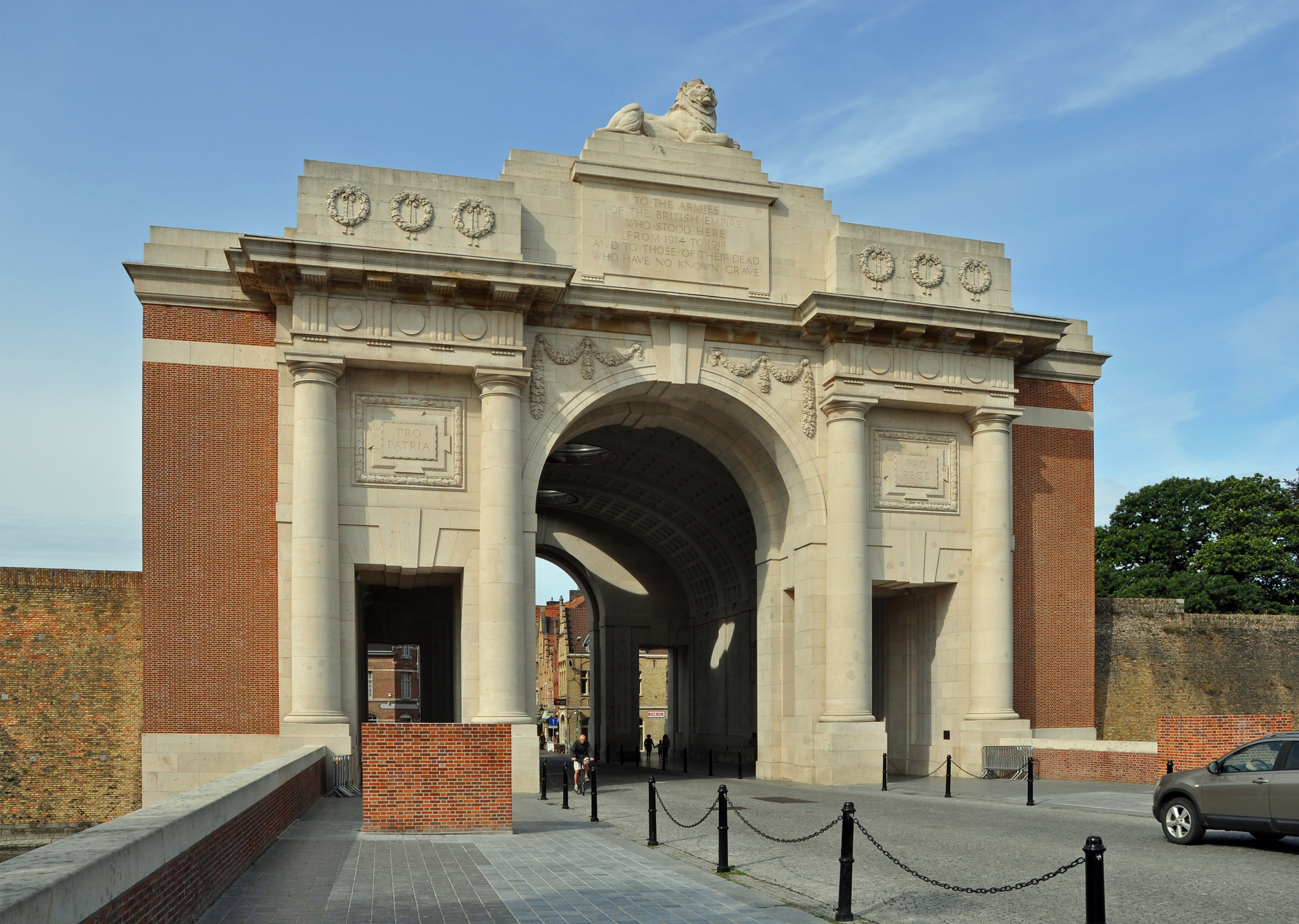
The race passes under the Menin Gate World War I memorial in Ypres during the race finale.

In 2008, the route was substantially modified, following the race's status as a UCI Pro Tour event. The distance was increased from ca. 200 km to 235 km. The course no longer ran along long coastal stretches, but instead approached Veurne from the polders. More climbs in Heuvelland were inserted: Zwarteberg, Baneberg, Rodeberg, Vidaigneberg and Monteberg preceded the double ascent of the Kemmelberg. As a consequence of the heavy crashes of the 2007 race, the Kemmelberg was approached from the village of Kemmel, in order to avoid the dangerous cobbled descent and potential new crashes.

In 2010 the Franco-Flemish hills of Kasselberg, Scherpenberg, Katsberg, and Berthen were re-introduced, before ensuing the traditional route in the Heuvelland hills. In recent years the city of Ypres features prominently in the race finale. In the context of the Centenary of the outbreak of World War I, the peloton crosses the city centre and leaves it passing under the iconic Menin Gate, arguably the most famous Flanders Fields memorial, before proceeding on the final run-in to the finish in Wevelgem.

The 2017 race saw the addition of three so-called Plugstreets in Ploegsteert Wood, semi-paved gravel roads at the Ploegsteert Memorial to the Missing, to commemorate the Christmas truce of 1914. (Note: Ploegsteert, where Winston Churchill served as Commanding Officer during 1916, was a site of trench warfare during World War I. On Christmas Eve 1914, German soldiers started singing Silent Night, Holy Night, to which the Allied troops responded with a rendition of The First Noel. On Christmas Day, German and Allied troops approached each other in No man's land, resulting in playing games of football. A similar ceasefire was observed in 1915 although in 1916 there were commands to execute any soldiers who fraternized with the enemy.) The three Plugstreets were integrated between the two Kemmel climbs, with a total distance of 5.2 km (3.2 mi).

The COVID-19 pandemic led to the change of calendar and that year's edition was postponed for the 11th of October.

Following Deinze (from 2003 to 2019) and Ypres (from 2020 to 2025), the starting location for the men’s race changed for the third time in 2026 (Middelkerke), with the initial location Ghent being permanently removed from the race’s name.

== Winners ==
Year	Country	Rider	Team
↓ Gent–Wevelgem ↓
1934	Belgium	Gustave Van Belle	
1935	Belgium	Albert Depreitre	
1936	Belgium	Robert Van Eenaeme	
1937	Belgium	Robert Van Eenaeme	
1938	Belgium	Hubert Godart	
1939	Belgium	André Declerck	
1940– 1944	No race		
1945	Belgium	Robert Van Eenaeme	
1946	Belgium	Ernest Sterckx	Alcyon
1947	Belgium	Maurice Desimpelaere	Alcyon
1948	Belgium	Valère Ollivier	
1949	Belgium	Marcel Kint	
1950	Belgium	Briek Schotte	Alcyon
1951	Belgium	André Rosseel	
1952	Belgium	Raymond Impanis	
1953	Belgium	Raymond Impanis	
1954	Switzerland	Rolf Graf	
1955	Belgium	Briek Schotte	Alcyon
1956	Belgium	Rik Van Looy	
1957	Belgium	Rik Van Looy	
1958	Belgium	Noël Foré	
1959	Belgium	Léon Van Daele	
1960	Belgium	Frans Aerenhouts	
1961	Belgium	Frans Aerenhouts	
1962	Belgium	Rik Van Looy	
1963	Belgium	Benoni Beheyt	
1964	France	Jacques Anquetil	
1965	Belgium	Noël De Pauw	
1966	Belgium	Herman Van Springel	
1967	Belgium	Eddy Merckx	Peugeot
1968	Belgium	Walter Godefroot	Flandria–De Clerck
1969	Belgium	Willy Vekemans	Goldor–Hertekamp–Gerka
1970	Belgium	Eddy Merckx	Faemino–Faema
1971	Belgium	Georges Pintens	Hertekamp–Magniflex
1972	Belgium	Roger Swerts	Molteni
1973	Belgium	Eddy Merckx	Molteni
1974	Great Britain	Barry Hoban	Gan–Mercier
1975	Belgium	Freddy Maertens	Carpenter–Confortluxe–Flandria
1976	Belgium	Freddy Maertens	Flandria–Velda–West Vlaams Vleesbedrijf
1977	France	Bernard Hinault	Gitane–Campagnolo
1978	Belgium	Ferdi Van Den Haute	Marc Zeepcentrale–Superia–ISC
1979	Italy	Francesco Moser	Sanson
1980	Netherlands	Henk Lubberding	TI–Raleigh–Creda
1981	Netherlands	Jan Raas	TI–Raleigh–Creda
1982	Belgium	Frank Hoste	TI–Raleigh–Campagnolo
1983	Netherlands	Leo van Vliet	TI–Raleigh–Campagnolo
1984	Italy	Guido Bontempi	Carrera–Inoxpran
1985	Belgium	Eric Vanderaerden	Panasonic
1986	Italy	Guido Bontempi	Carrera–Inoxpran
1987	Netherlands	Teun van Vliet	Panasonic
1988	Ireland	Sean Kelly	Kas
1989	Netherlands	Gerrit Solleveld	Superconfex–Yoko
1990	Belgium	Herman Frison	Histor–Sigma
1991	Soviet Union	Djamolidine Abdoujaparov	Carrera Jeans–Tassoni
1992	Italy	Mario Cipollini	GB-MG
1993	Italy	Mario Cipollini	GB-MG
1994	Belgium	Wilfried Peeters	GB-MG
1995	Denmark	Lars Michaelsen	Festina–Lotus
1996	Belgium	Tom Steels	Mapei–GB
1997	France	Philippe Gaumont	Cofidis
1998	Belgium	Frank Vandenbroucke	Mapei–Bricobi
1999	Belgium	Tom Steels	Mapei–Quick-Step
2000	Belgium	Geert Van Bondt	Farm Frites
2001	United States	George Hincapie	U.S. Postal Service
2002	Italy	Mario Cipollini	Acqua & Sapone–Cantina Tollo
2003	Germany	Andreas Klier	Team Telekom
2004	Belgium	Tom Boonen	Quick-Step–Davitamon
2005	Belgium	Nico Mattan	Davitamon–Lotto
2006	Norway	Thor Hushovd	Crédit Agricole
2007	Germany	Marcus Burghardt	T-Mobile Team
2008	Spain	Óscar Freire	Rabobank
2009	Norway	Edvald Boasson Hagen	Team Columbia–High Road
2010	Austria	Bernhard Eisel	Team HTC–Columbia
2011	Belgium	Tom Boonen	Quick-Step
2012	Belgium	Tom Boonen	Omega Pharma–Quick-Step
2013	Slovakia	Peter Sagan	Cannondale
2014	Germany	John Degenkolb	Giant–Shimano
2015	Italy	Luca Paolini	Team Katusha
2016	Slovakia	Peter Sagan	Tinkoff
2017	Belgium	Greg Van Avermaet	BMC Racing Team
2018	Slovakia	Peter Sagan	Bora–Hansgrohe
2019	Norway	Alexander Kristoff	UAE Team Emirates
2020	Denmark	Mads Pedersen	Trek–Segafredo
2021	Belgium	Wout van Aert	Team Jumbo–Visma
2022	Eritrea	Biniam Girmay	Intermarché–Wanty–Gobert Matériaux
2023	France	Christophe Laporte	Team Jumbo–Visma
2024	Denmark	Mads Pedersen	Lidl–Trek
2025	Denmark	Mads Pedersen	Lidl–Trek
↓ In Flanders Fields ↓
2026	Belgium	Jasper Philipsen	Alpecin–Premier Tech

=== Multiple winners ===
Riders in italics are still active

Wins	Rider	Country	Editions
3	Robert Van Eenaeme	Belgium	1936, 1937, 1945
3	Rik Van Looy	Belgium	1956, 1957, 1962
3	Eddy Merckx	Belgium	1967, 1970, 1973
3	Mario Cipollini	Italy	1992, 1993, 2002
3	Tom Boonen	Belgium	2004, 2011, 2012
3	Peter Sagan	Slovakia	2013, 2016, 2018
3	Mads Pedersen	Denmark	2020, 2024, 2025
2	Raymond Impanis	Belgium	1952, 1953
2	Briek Schotte	Belgium	1950, 1955
2	Frans Aerenhouts	Belgium	1960, 1961
2	Freddy Maertens	Belgium	1975, 1976
2	Guido Bontempi	Italy	1984, 1986
2	Tom Steels	Belgium	1996, 1999

=== Wins per country ===
Wins	Country
51	Belgium
7	Italy
5	Netherlands
4	France; Denmark
3	Germany; Norway; Slovakia
1	Austria; Eritrea; Great Britain; Ireland; Soviet Union; Spain; Switzerland; United States

== Women's race ==
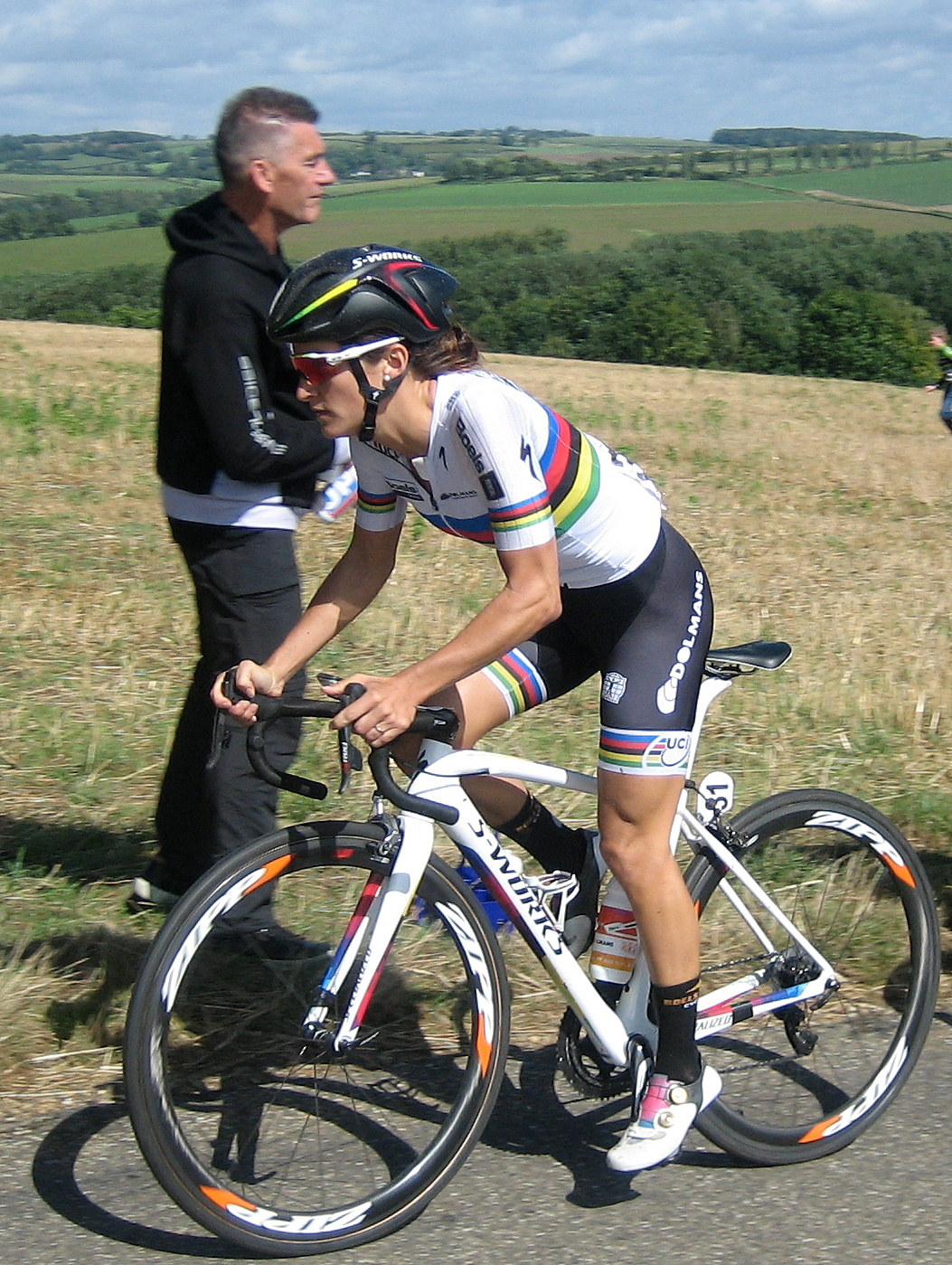
Britain's Lizzie Armitstead (pictured in 2016) won the first women's Gent–Wevelgem in 2012.

Since 2012 a women's race of Gent–Wevelgem is held, on the same day as the men's event but over a shorter course. Unlike the men's race, the start is in Ypres and the course does not cover the hills in Northern France. The inaugural women's edition was won by British rider Lizzie Armitstead after a 40-km solo breakaway. Since 2016 the race is included in the UCI Women's World Tour, cycling's top-tier female elite competition.

Year	Country	Rider	Team
↓ Gent–Wevelgem ↓
2012	Great Britain	Lizzie Armitstead	AA Drink–leontien.nl
2013	Netherlands	Kirsten Wild	Argos–Shimano
2014	United States	Lauren Hall	Optum–Kelly Benefit Strategies
2015	Netherlands	Floortje Mackaij	Team Liv–Plantur
2016	Netherlands	Chantal Blaak	Boels–Dolmans
2017	Finland	Lotta Lepistö	Cervélo–Bigla Pro Cycling
2018	Italy	Marta Bastianelli	Alé–Cipollini
2019	Netherlands	Kirsten Wild	WNT–Rotor Pro Cycling
2020	Belgium	Jolien D'Hoore	Boels–Dolmans
2021	Netherlands	Marianne Vos	Team Jumbo–Visma
2022	Italy	Elisa Balsamo	Trek–Segafredo
2023	Switzerland	Marlen Reusser	SD Worx
2024	Netherlands	Lorena Wiebes	Team SD Worx–Protime
2025	Netherlands	Lorena Wiebes	Team SD Worx–Protime
↓ In Flanders Fields ↓
2026	Netherlands	Lorena Wiebes	Team SD Worx–Protime

=== Wins per country ===
Wins	Country
8	Netherlands
2	Italy
1	Belgium; Finland; Great Britain; Switzerland; United States

== Cyclosportive ==
Since 2009, a cyclosportive is organized on the day before the professional event. There are four distances, ranging from 60 km to 215 km. All courses start and finish in Wevelgem, at the finishing location of the professional event. Most routes pass through the Menin Gate in Ypres, flirt with the French border, tackle the Kemmelberg before turning back towards Wevelgem. There are 5.000 participants on average; 40% of which are non-Belgians.
