= Frans Aerenhouts =

Belgian cyclist (1937–2022)

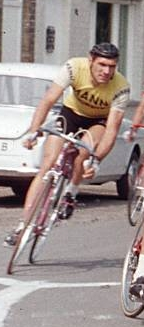
- Aerenhouts in 1967

Personal information
- Born: 4 July 1937 Wilrijk, Belgium
- Died: 30 January 2022 (aged 84) Wilrijk, Belgium

Cycling career
- Sport: Cycling
- Discipline: Road
- Role: Rider

Professional teams
- 1958: Groene Leeuw–Leopold
- 1959–1962: Mercier–BP–Hutchinson
- 1963: G.B.C.–Gramaglia
- 1964–1966: Mercier–BP–Hutchinson
- 1967: Dr. Mann–Grundig

Frans Aerenhouts (4 July 1937 – 30 January 2022) was a Belgian cyclist. He died on 30 January 2022, at the age of 84. He most notably won Gent–Wevelgem in 1960 and 1961 and a stage of the 1963 Vuelta a España.

== Major results ==
1957
1st Overall Tour de Berlin
1958
1st Stage 3 Tour de l'Ouest
3rd Road race, National Road Championships
9th Road race, UCI Road World Championships
1959
1st Omloop Mandel-Leie-Schelde
3rd Four Days of Dunkirk
6th Bordeaux–Paris
8th Liège–Bastogne–Liège
8th Paris–Tours
9th Paris–Roubaix
1960
1st Gent–Wevelgem
2nd Ronde van Limburg
6th Paris–Roubaix
1961
1st Gent–Wevelgem
2nd E3 Harelbeke
3rd La Flèche Wallonne
1962
7th Paris–Roubaix
10th Bordeaux–Paris
1963
1st Stage 12 Vuelta a España
2nd Schaal Sels
3rd Road race, National Road Championships
1964
3rd Scheldeprijs
4th Omloop Het Volk
1965
1st Grote Prijs Stad Zottegem
2nd Grand Prix d'Isbergues
1966
2nd Schaal Sels
1967
1st Grand Prix d'Antibes
