= Sylvain Grysolle =

Belgian cyclist (1915–1985)

Personal information
- Born: 12 December 1915 Wichelen, Belgium
- Died: 19 January 1985 (aged 69) Aalst, Belgium

Cycling career
- Sport: Cycling
- Discipline: Road
- Role: Rider

Professional teams
- 1936–1943: Dilecta–Wolber
- 1946–1950: Rochet–Dunlop

Major wins
- One-day races and Classics La Flèche Wallonne (1941) Tour of Flanders (1945) Omloop Het Volk (1948) Schaal Sels (1935, 1936) Scheldeprijs (1937) Kampioenschap van Vlaanderen (1938, 1945)

Sylvain Grysolle (12 December 1915 – 19 January 1985) was a Belgian cyclist. He won the 1948 Omloop Het Volk, the 1945 Tour of Flanders, and the 1941 La Flèche Wallonne.

== Major results ==
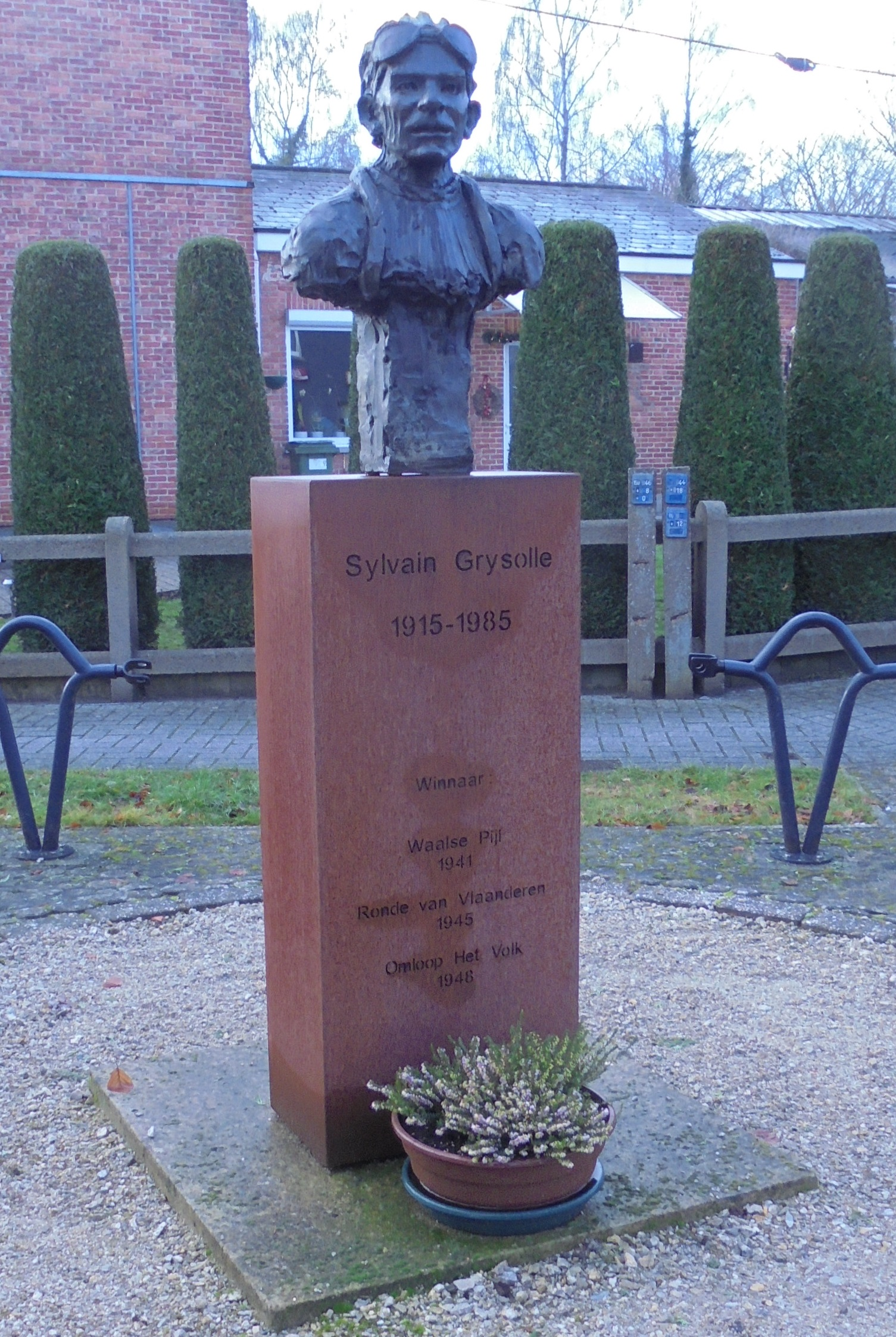
Monument Sylvain Grysolle in Wichelen

1935
1st Schaal Sels
1936
1st Schaal Sels
8th Paris–Roubaix
1937
1st Scheldeprijs
1st Dr. Tistaertprijs Zottegem
1st Heusden Koers
1938
1st Kampioenschap van Vlaanderen
1st Omloop der Vlaamse Gewesten
2nd Circuit du Morbihan (fr)
8th Paris–Roubaix
1939
1st Stage 2 Tour of Belgium
1st Heusden Koers
3rd GP Stad Vilvoorde
3rd Omloop der Vlaamse Gewesten
6th Paris–Roubaix
7th Tour of Flanders
9th Overall Deutschland Tour

1st Stages 4, 17b, 18 & 19

10th Liège–Bastogne–Liège
1940
2nd GP Stad Vilvoorde
3rd GP Stekene (nl)
1941
1st La Flèche Wallonne
2nd Grote Prijs Stad Zottegem
1942
3rd Grote 1-MeiPrijs
3rd Grote Prijs Stad Zottegem
4th Tour of Flanders
1943
4th Tour of Flanders
1944
1st Grote 1-MeiPrijs
1st Stage 2 Tour of Belgium
2nd Ronde van Limburg
1945
1st Tour of Flanders
1st Kampioenschap van Vlaanderen
1st Omloop Gemeente Melle
2nd Overall Tour of Belgium

1st Stage 1

4th Liège–Bastogne–Liège
8th La Flèche Wallonne
1946
1st Elfstedenronde
2nd Paris–Brussels
3rd Gullegem Koerse
5th Tour of Flanders
6th Overall Dwars door Vlaanderen
6th Nokere Koerse
1947
1st Stage 1b GP des Routiers Prior
1st GP Erpe-Mere (nl)
8th Gent–Wevelgem
1948
1st Omloop Het Volk
1st GP Erpe-Mere (nl)
