= 1948 Omloop Het Volk =

Race details
- Dates: 17 March 1948
- Stages: 1
- Distance: 240 km (150 mi)
- Winning time: 6h 40' 02"

Results
	Winner	Sylvain Grysolle (BEL)
	Second	Fausto Coppi (ITA)
	Third	Marcel Hendrickx (BEL)

The 1948 Omloop Het Volk was the fourth edition of the Omloop Het Volk cycle race and was held on 17 March 1948. The race started and finished in Ghent. The race was won by Sylvain Grysolle.

== General classification ==
Final general classification
Rank	Rider	Time
1	Sylvain Grysolle (BEL)	6h 40' 02"
2	Fausto Coppi (ITA)	+ 0"
3	Marcel Hendrickx (BEL)	+ 0"
4	André Rosseel (BEL)	+ 0"
5	Frans Leenen (BEL)	+ 0"
6	Georges Claes (BEL)	+ 0"
7	Michel Remue (BEL)	+ 0"
8	Maurice Meersman (BEL)	+ 0"
9	Albert Ramon (BEL)	+ 0"
10	Roger Chupin (FRA)	+ 0"
