= Heusden Koers =

Belgian one-day road cycling race

Race details
- Date: Mid August
- Region: Flanders, Belgium
- English name: Heusden Koers
- Discipline: Road
- Type: One-day race
- Web site: www.heusdenkoers.be

Men's history
- First edition: 1929
- Editions: 74 (as of 2025)
- First winner: Alfred Hamerlinck (BEL)
- Most wins: Dirk Heirweg (BEL); Kenny Dehaes (BEL) (3 wins)
- Most recent: Timothy Dupont (BEL)

Heusden Koers is a road bicycle race in Belgium, held annually since 1929. The race has Heusden (East Flanders) as both start and finish place. The riders complete several laps through the area, ultimately competing for victory in local rounds. The event attracts between 20,000 and 30,000 spectators each edition.

== Men's Race Winners ==
Year	Country	Rider	Team
1929	Belgium	Alfred Hamerlinck	Génial Lucifer-Hutchinson
1930–35	No race		
1936	Belgium	Karel Clapdorp	Dossche Sport
1937	Belgium	Sylvain Grysolle	Dilecta–Wolber
1938	Belgium	Marcel Claeys	La Française
1939	Belgium	Sylvain Grysolle	Dilecta–Wolber
1940–51	No race		
1952	Belgium	Leon Delathouwer	Van Hauwaert
1953	Belgium	Marcel Hendrickx	Plume Sport
1954	Belgium	Lucien Mathys	Groene Leeuw
1955	Belgium	Andre Pieters	Bertin
1956	Belgium	Rafael Jonckheere	The Dura
1957–58	No race		
1959	Belgium	Gilbert Desmet	Faema
1960	Belgium	Frans De Mulder	Wiel's-Groene Leeuw
1961	Belgium	Rik Van Looy	Faema
1962	Belgium	Gilbert De Smet	Wiel's-Groene Leeuw
1963	Belgium	Gustaaf De Smet	Wiel's-Groene Leeuw
1964	Belgium	Edward Sels	Solo–Superia
1965	Belgium	Rik Van Looy	Solo–Superia
1966	Belgium	Joseph Huysmans	Dr. Mann-Grundig
1967	Belgium	Joseph Huysmans	Dr. Mann-Grundig
1968	Belgium	Leopold Van den Neste	Pull Over Centrale–Novy
1969	Belgium	Walter Godefroot	Flandria–De Clerck–Krüger
1970	Belgium	Martin Van Den Bossche	Molteni
1971	Netherlands	Gerben Karstens	Goudsmit–Hoff
1972	Belgium	André Dierickx	Beaulieu–Flandria
1973	Belgium	Victor Van Schil	Molteni
1974	Belgium	Willy Planckaert	IJsboerke–Colner
1975	Belgium	Roger De Vlaeminck	Brooklyn
1976	Belgium	Freddy Maertens	Flandria–Velda
1977	Belgium	Walter Godefroot	IJsboerke–Colnago
1978	Belgium	Freddy Maertens	Flandria–Velda-Lano
1979	Belgium	Johnny De Nul	Lano–Boule d'Or
1980	Belgium	Roger De Vlaeminck	Boule d'Or-Colnago-Studio Casa
1981	Belgium	Dirk Heirweg	Boston–Mavic
1982	Belgium	Dirk Heirweg	Van de Ven Olen-Moser
1983	Belgium	Lucien Van Impe	Metauro Mobili–Pinarello
1984	Belgium	Dirk Heirweg	Safir–Van de Ven
1985	Belgium	Luc Govaerts	Lotto-Merckx-Campagnolo
1986	Belgium	Yvan Lamote	Hitachi-Marc-Splendor
1987	Netherlands	Henri Manders	PDM–Ultima–Concorde
1988	Belgium	Patrick Onnockx	AD Renting–Anti-M–Bottecchia
1989	Belgium	Sammie Moreels	Lotto-Vitus-Assos-Opel
1990	Belgium	Yves Godimus	La William–Saltos
1991	Belgium	Bart Leysen	Lotto-Superclub
1992	Belgium	Jan Bogaert	Assur Carpets-Willy Naessens
1993	Russia	Viatcheslav Ekimov	Novemail
1994	Belgium	Herman Frison	Lotto-Mavic
1995	Belgium	Kurt Onclin	Palmans-Ipso
1996	Belgium	Johan Capiot	Collstrop-Lystex-Merckx
1997	Belgium	Gert Vanderaerden	Palmans-Lystex
1998	Belgium	Jean-Pierre Heynderickx	Home Market-Ville de Chareloi
1999	Netherlands	Berry Hoedemakers	Spar
2000	Belgium	Peter Van Petegem	Farm Frites
2001	Belgium	Geert Omloop	Collstrop-Palmans
2002	Belgium	Peter Wuyts	Collstrop-Palmans
2003	Belgium	Tom Steels	Landbouwkrediet–Colnago
2004	Belgium	Andy Cappelle	Chocolade Jacques–Wincor Nixdorf
2005	Belgium	Nick Nuyens	Quick-Step–Innergetic
2006	Belgium	Geert Omloop	Unibet.com
2007	Belgium	Wouter Weylandt	Quick-Step–Innergetic
2008	Belgium	Frédéric Amorison	Landbouwkrediet-Tönissteiner
2009	United States	Tyler Farrar	Garmin-Slipstream
2010	Belgium	Wouter Weylandt	Quick-Step
2011	Belgium	James Vanlandschoot	Veranda's Willems–Accent
2012	Belgium	Timothy Dupont	Jong Vlaanderen–Bauknecht
2013	Belgium	Kenny Dehaes	Lotto-Belisol
2014	Belgium	Dries De Bondt	Josan–To Win
2015	Belgium	Kenny Dehaes	Lotto-Soudal
2016	Belgium	Timothy Dupont	Veranda's Willems Cycling Team
2017	Belgium	Kenny Dehaes	Wanty–Groupe Gobert
2018	Belgium	Benjamin Verraes	VDM Van Durme–Michiels–Trawobo CT
2019	Belgium	Tim Merlier	Corendon-Circus
2020–21	No race		
2022	Belgium	Tom Van Asbroeck	Israel Cycling Academy
2023	Great Britain	Harry Tanfield	TDT–Unibet Cycling Team
2024	Belgium	Elias Van Breussegem	Team Shifting Gears Strategica
2025	Belgium	Timothy Dupont	Tarteletto–Isorex

== Books ==
- Heusdenkoers – het Wereldkampioenschap der Kermiskoersen by Stefaan van Laere in 2018, Partizaan, 176 p. (Dutch) ISBN 9789492007490
