= Joseph Somers (cyclist) =

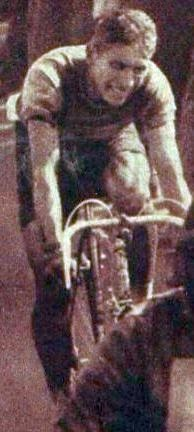
- Somers winning the 1937 Bordeaux–Paris

Personal information
- Born: 29 May 1917 Wommelgem, Belgium
- Died: 25 May 1966 (aged 48) Antwerp, Belgium

Cycling career
- Sport: Cycling
- Discipline: Road
- Role: Rider

Professional teams
- 1936–1938: Mercier–Hutchinson
- 1939–1942: Helyett–Hutchinson
- 1944: Trialoux
- 1945: Rochet–Dunlop
- 1946: Cilo
- 1947–1950: Rochet–Dunlop

Joseph Somers (29 May 1917 – 25 May 1966) was a Belgian professional road cyclist. Professional from 1936 to 1950, he notably won Bordeaux–Paris in 1937 and 1947, the Grand Prix des Nations in 1943 and the Tour of Belgium in 1939.

== Major results ==
1935
2nd Schaal Sels
1936
1st Stage 5 Tour de l'Ouest
2nd Gent–Wevelgem
1937
1st Bordeaux–Paris
1st Stage 4 (ITT) Tour of Belgium
3rd Paris–Rennes
9th Liège–Bastogne–Liège
1938
1st Stage 4a (ITT) Tour of Belgium
1939
1st Overall Tour of Belgium

1st Stages 4a (ITT), 4b & 5

1st Stages 6 & 7 Tour de Suisse
1st Stage 1 Tour de Luxembourg
6th Liège–Bastogne–Liège
1941
1st De Drie Zustersteden
9th Tour of Flanders
1942
3rd National Cyclo-cross Championships
1943
1st Grand Prix des Nations
1st Grand Prix de Momignies
1st GP de Belgique
2nd Critérium des As
3rd National Cyclo-cross Championships
6th Liège–Bastogne–Liège
1944
1st Grand Prix de Wallonie
1945
5th Overall Tour of Belgium
5th A Travers Lausanne
1946
2nd Bordeaux–Paris
4th Liège–Bastogne–Liège
10th La Flèche Wallonne
1947
1st Bordeaux–Paris
1950
3rd Bordeaux–Paris
