= Wevelgem =

- Municipality
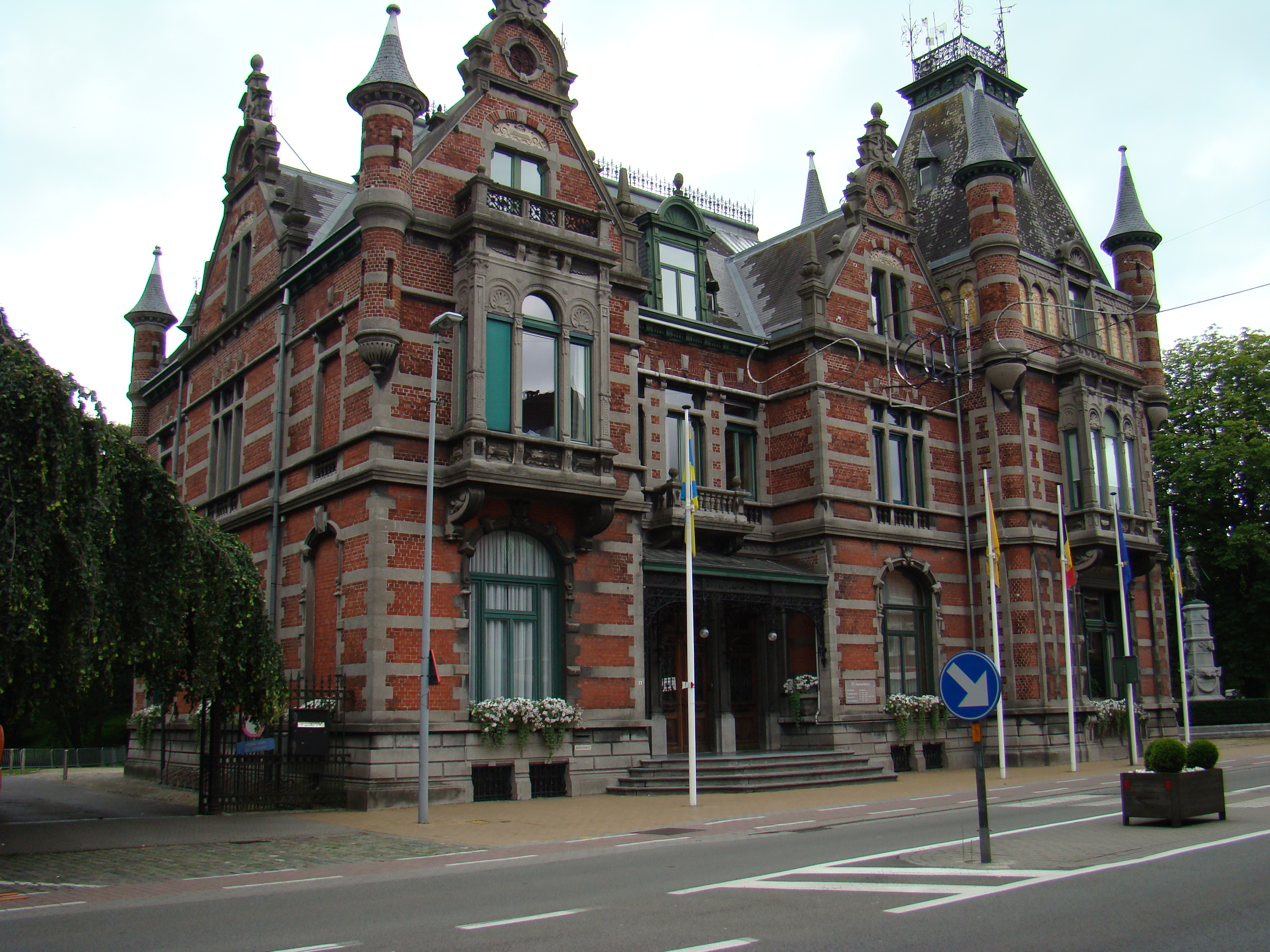
- Wevelgem town hall

- Flag Coat of arms

- Location of Wevelgem in West-Flanders
- Interactive map of Wevelgem
- Location in Belgium
- Coordinates: 50°48′N 03°10′E
- Country: Belgium
- Community: Flemish Community
- Region: Flemish Region
- Province: West Flanders
- Arrondissement: Kortrijk

Government
  - Mayor: Jan Seynhaeve (CD&V)
  - Governing party: CD&V

Area
  - Total: 39.14 km^{2} (15.11 sq mi)

Population (2018-01-01)
  - Total: 31,412
  - Density: 802.6/km^{2} (2,079/sq mi)
- Postal codes: 8560
- NIS code: 34041
- Area codes: 056
- Website: www.wevelgem.be

Wevelgem (Dutch pronunciation: [ˈʋeːvəlɣɛm]) is a municipality located in the Belgian province of West Flanders. The municipality comprises the towns of Gullegem, Moorsele and Wevelgem proper. On January 1, 2006, Wevelgem had a total population of 31,020. The total area is 38.76 km^{2} which gives a population density of 800 inhabitants per km^{2}.

Wevelgem is accessible by road (E403 – A19 – R8), by boat (De Leie), by air (Kortrijk-Wevelgem International Airport) or by train at Wevelgem railway station.

Wevelgem is known for the annual Gent–Wevelgem bicycle road race which finishes in the town.

== History ==
The earliest known mention dates from 1197. Wevelgem was home to the Cistercian Guldenberg Abbey in the 13th–14th centuries, which owned grain mills in various locations. From c. 1278 to 1310, abbess Ida was in charge, though Marc Brion lists it as an abbey for men.

In the old days, the river De Leie was important for Wevelgem. The people used the river to soak flax, before they processed it in one of the many flax factories in Wevelgem. That is also the reason De Leie got the nickname The Golden River, referring to the colour of the flax. Because selling flax was lucrative, many people came to Wevelgem and stayed there for many generations. Nowadays, the cultivation of flax is less important, but some factories still process it.

During the First World War, the Germans constructed an airport. The airport still exists and is now used for private purposes. Also remaining is the German Military cemetery, which is also partly situated in Menen. There are 47,864 soldiers buried there, who all died during WW1. This makes the cemetery the biggest German cemetery in Belgium. Across the cemetery, there used to be a (fake) airport, with wooden planes to mislead the enemy; there are still remains of the airport consisting of a big bunker and a small bunker near the railway. The bridge that connects Lauwe to Wevelgem was destroyed during the Second World War and was rebuilt later.

== Notable people ==
- Annelien Coorevits, Miss Belgium 2007
- Justine De Jonckheere, Miss Belgium 2011
- Steak Number Eight, rock band founded in 2007, broke through in the same year
- Dag Otto Lauritzen, Norwegian former cyclist, lived in Gullegem whilst active
- Aagje Vanwalleghem, gymnast, qualified for the finals of the Olympic Games 2004
- Steven Vanackere, (Dutch: [ˈsteːvə(n) vɑnˈɑkərə]), Flemish politician was born in Wevelgem
- Jean-Claude Van Geenberghe, Belgian-Ukrainian equestrian lived in Moorsele
- Camille Dhont, Belgian singer and actress born in Wevelgem

== Gallery ==
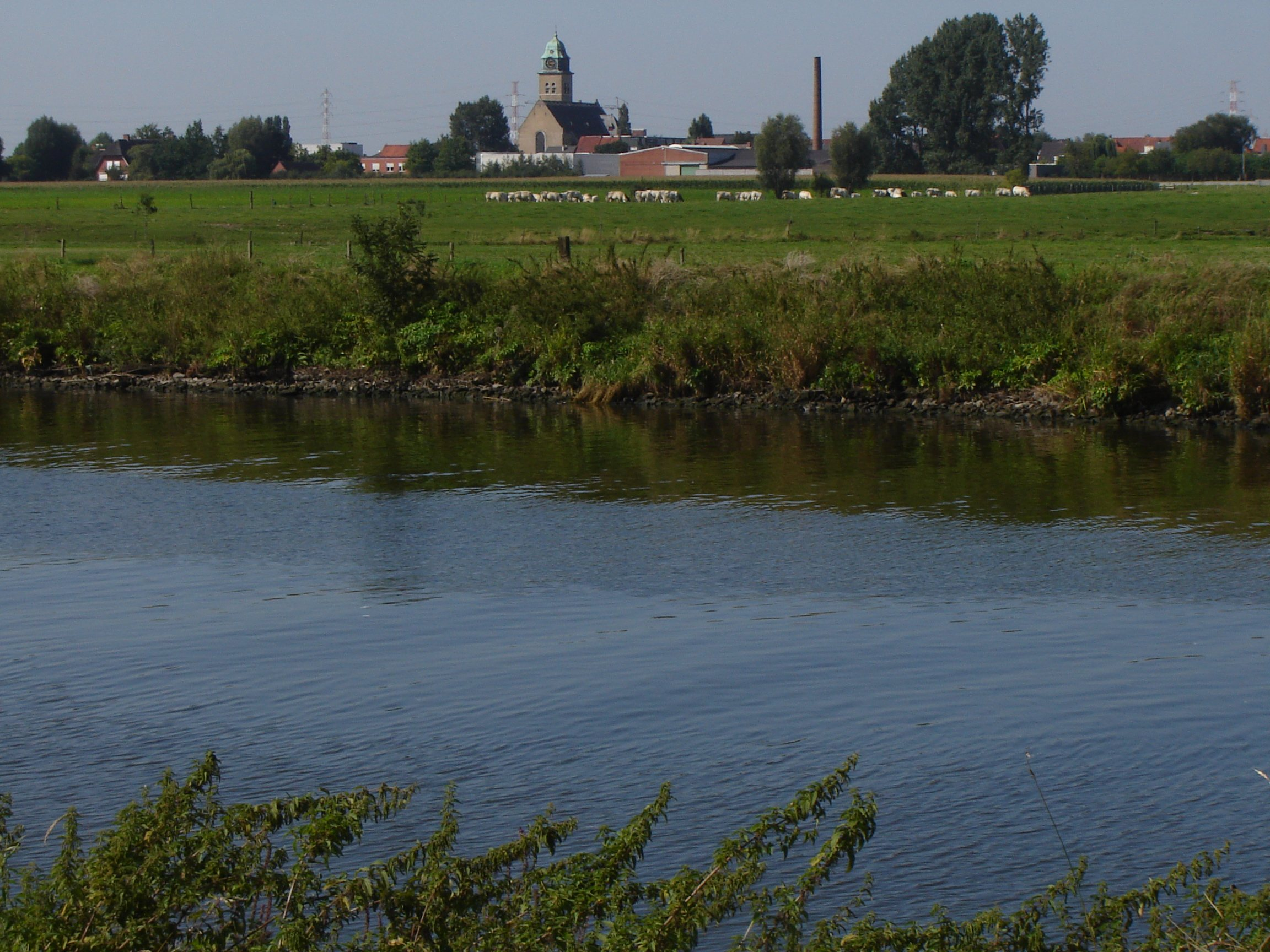
Sint-Theresia's Church near Wevelgem.

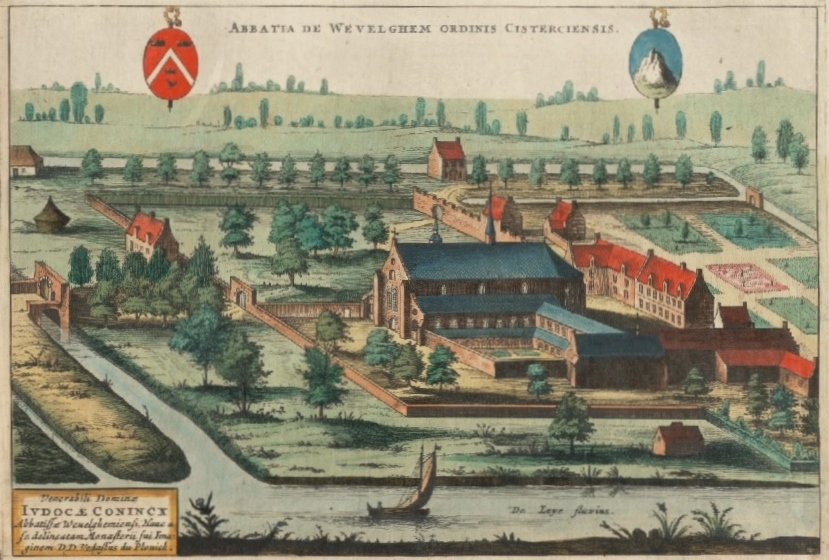
Guldenberg Abbey of Wevelgem in 1641.

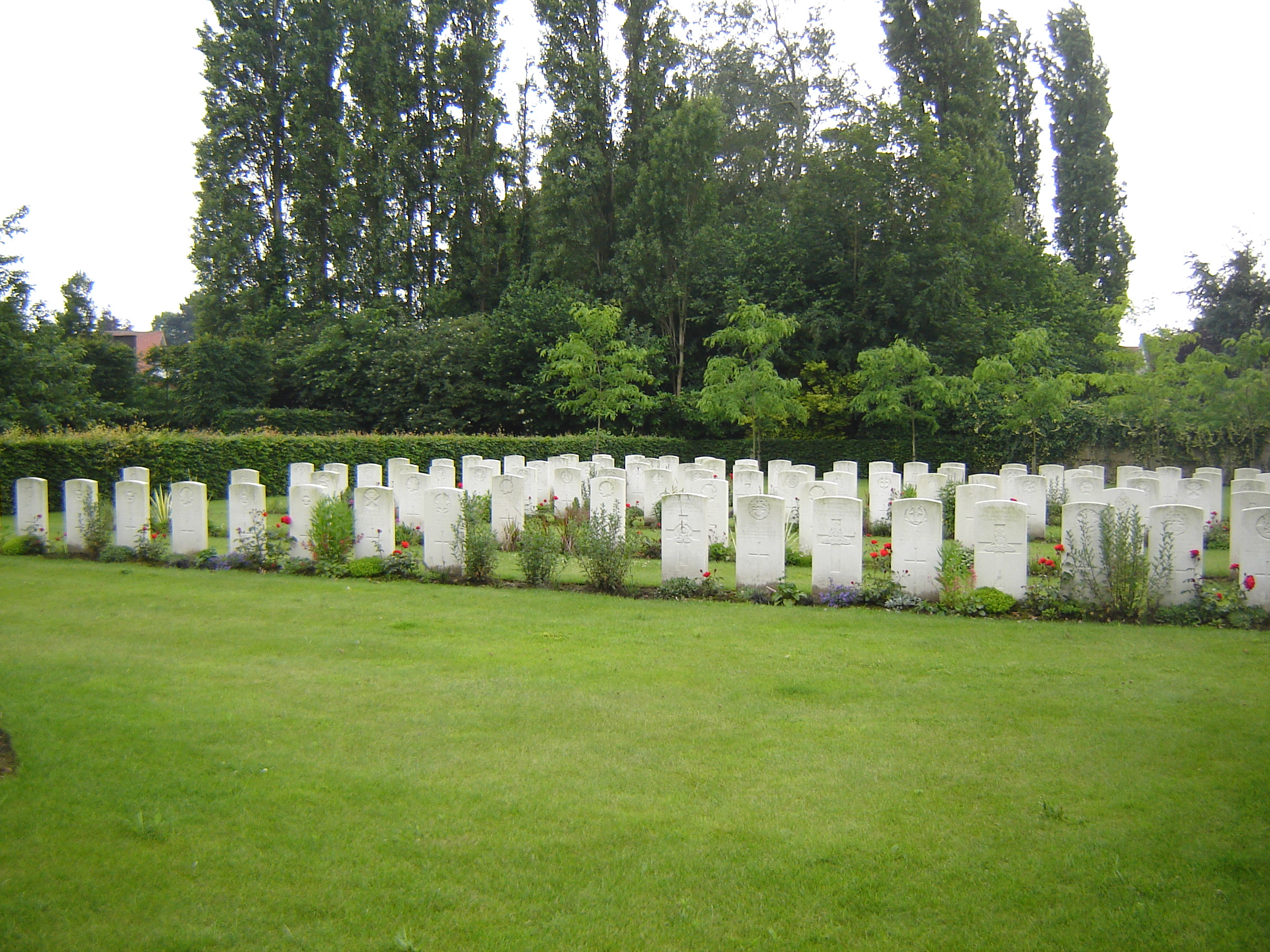
Military cemetery in Moorsele.
