= Tielt–Antwerpen–Tielt =

Tielt-Antwerpen-Tielt
Race details
- Date: June, July
- Region: Antwerp, East-Flanders, West-Flanders Belgium
- English name: Tielt-Antwerp-Tielt
- Local name(s): Tielt-Antwerpen-Tielt (in Dutch)
- Discipline: Road
- Type: One-day race

History
- First edition: 1938
- Editions: 18
- Final edition: 1968
- First winner: Louis Hardiquest (BEL)
- Most wins: Jacques De Boever (BEL); (4 wins)
- Final winner: Willy Donie (BEL)

Tielt-Antwerp-Tielt was a men's cycling race organised for the last time in 1968. The race was run between Tielt (West Flanders) and Antwerp. In 1945, a shortened version of 144 km was run with start place Antwerp and finish place Tielt. In 1958, Antwerp was both start and finish place.

The competition's roll of honor includes the successes of Briek Schotte and Rik Van Looy.

== Winners ==
Year	Winner	Second	Third
1938	(Belgium) Louis Hardiquest	(Belgium) Petrus Van Teemsche	(Belgium) Albert Beirnaert
1939	(Belgium) Marcel Claeys	(Belgium) Aloïs Delchambre	(Belgium) Gerard Delepeleire
1940-1944	No race during World War II		
1945	(Belgium) Briek Schotte	(Belgium) Omer Mommerency	(Belgium) Lode Poels
1946	(Belgium) Maurice Van Herzele	(Belgium) Jozef Moerenhout	(Belgium) Albert Sercu
1947	(Belgium) Frans Knaepkens	(Belgium) Maurice Meersman	(Belgium) Achiel Buysse
1948	(Belgium) André Maelbrancke	(Belgium) Lucien Mathys	(Belgium) Constant Lauwers
1949	(Belgium) André Maelbrancke	(Belgium) Jerôme De Jaeger	(Belgium) André Pieters
1950-1957	No race		
1958	(Belgium) Gabriel Borra	(Belgium) Frans van Looveren	(Belgium) Marcel Rijckaert
1959	(Belgium) Rik Van Looy	(Belgium) Willy Truye	(Belgium) Julien Pascal
1960	(Belgium) Léon Vandaele	(Belgium) Marcel Rijckaert	(Belgium) Leopold Rosseel
1961	(Belgium) Jaak De Boever	(Belgium) Marcel Seynaeve	(Belgium) Noël Foré
1962	(Belgium) Jaak De Boever	(Belgium) Clément Roman	(Belgium) Oswald Declercq
1963	(Belgium) Roland Aper	(Belgium) Oswald Declercq	(Belgium) Walter Boucquet
1964	(Belgium) Jaak De Boever	(Belgium) Oswald Declercq	(Belgium) Roger Deconinck
1965	(Netherlands) Walter Boucquet	(Belgium) Jaak De Boever	(Belgium) Walter Godefroot
1966	(Belgium) Jaak De Boever	(Belgium) Gustaaf De Smet	(Belgium) Robert Lelangue
1967	(Belgium) Roger Blockx	(Belgium) Herman Van Loo	(Belgium) Antoine Houbrechts
1968	(Belgium) Willy Donie	(Belgium) Herman Van Loo	(Belgium) Roland Van de Rijse
