= Ronde van Oost-Vlaanderen =

Belgian cycling race

Race details
- Date: May, June
- Region: Flanders, Belgium
- English name: Tour of East Flanders
- Local name(s): Ronde van Oost-Vlaanderen (in Dutch), Tour de la Flandre Orientale (in French)
- Discipline: Road
- Type: One-day race

History
- First edition: 1960
- Editions: 14
- Final edition: 1973
- First winner: Emiel Verheyden (BEL)
- Most wins: Gilbert Desmet (BEL); (2 wins)
- Final winner: Eddy Merckx (BEL)

The Ronde van Oost-Vlaanderen was a Belgian cycling race organized for the last time in 1973.

The course, in the province of East Flanders, was around 200 km. Evergem was both start and finish place.

The competition's roll of honor includes the successes of Benoni Beheyt and Eddy Merckx.

== Winners ==
Year	Winner	Second	Third
1960	(Belgium) Emiel Verheyden	(Belgium) Oswald Declercq	(Belgium) Jozef Schils
1961	(Belgium) Willy Vanden Berghen	(Belgium) Clément Roman	(Belgium) Norbert Kerckhove
1962	(Belgium) Georges Decraeye	(Belgium) José Denoyette	(Belgium) Henri De Wolf
1963	(Belgium) René Van Meenen	(Belgium) Jaak De Boever	(Belgium) Edmond Coppens
1964	(Belgium) Benoni Beheyt	(Belgium) René Van Meenen	(Belgium) Norbert Coreelman
1965	(Belgium) August Verhaegen	(Belgium) Guido Reybrouck	(Belgium) Jozef Huysmans
1966	(Belgium) Gilbert Desmet	(Belgium) Yvan Verbist	(Belgium) Gustaaf Desmet
1967	(Belgium) Georges Vandenberghe	(Belgium) Jaak De Boever	(Belgium) Frans Aerenhouts
1968	(Belgium) Gilbert Desmet	(Belgium) Gustaaf Desmet	(Belgium) Luc Leman
1969	(Belgium) Frans Verbeeck	(Belgium) Yvan Verbist	(Belgium) Jozef Moons
1970	(Belgium) Frans Mintjens	(Belgium) Georges Vandenberghe	(Belgium) Eddy Merckx
1971	(Belgium) Joseph Bruyere	(Belgium) Maurice Eyers	(Belgium) Julien Stevens
1972	(Belgium) Willy Vanneste	(Belgium) Gilbert Wuytack	(Belgium) Willy Planckaert
1973	(Belgium) Eddy Merckx	(Netherlands) Richard Bukacki	(Belgium) Alfons De Bal
