= 1964 Dwars door België =

Race details
- Dates: 29–30 March 1964
- Stages: 2
- Distance: 437 km (271.5 mi)

Results
	Winner	Piet van Est (NED)
	Second	Etienne Vercauteren (BEL)
	Third	Joseph Dewit (BEL)

The 1964 Dwars door België was the 20th edition of the Dwars door Vlaanderen cycle race and was held on 29–30 March 1964. The race started and finished in Waregem. The race was won by Piet van Est.

== General classification ==
Final general classification

Rank	Rider	Points
1	Piet van Est (NED)	17
2	Etienne Vercauteren (BEL)	23
3	Joseph Dewit (BEL)	31
4	Gustaaf De Smet (BEL)	33
5	Romain Van Wijnsberghe (BEL)	33
6	Frans Verbeeck (BEL)	36
7	Jaak De Boever (BEL)	38
8	Willy Raes (BEL)	39
9	Daniel Andries (BEL)	43
10	Walter Muylaert (BEL)	46
