= 1970 Dwars door België =

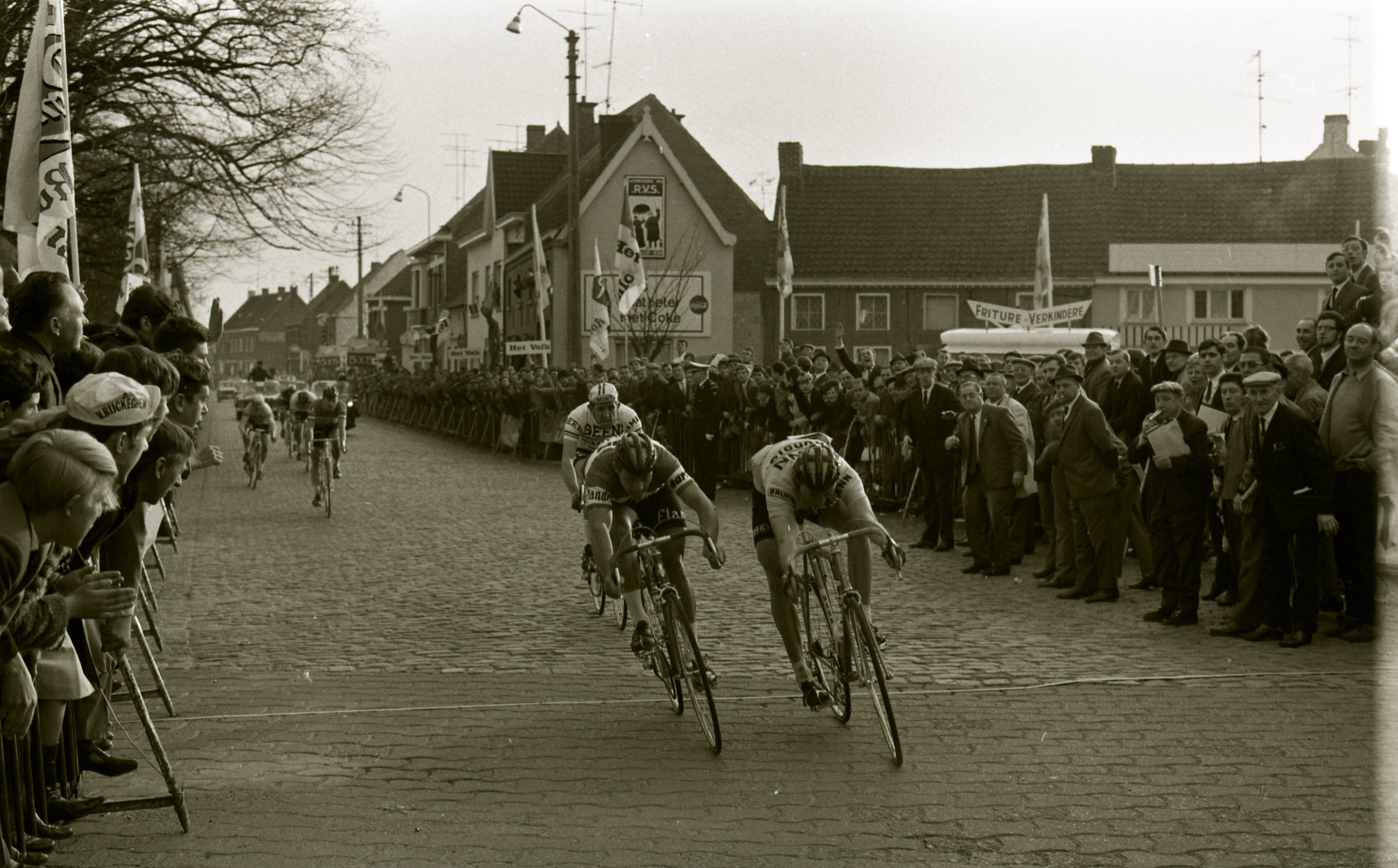
- Arrival of Daniël Vanryckeghem and Eric Leman in Waregem, Dwars door België 1970 (collectie KOERS. Museum van de Wielersport)

Race details
- Dates: 22 March 1970
- Stages: 1
- Distance: 195 km (121.2 mi)
- Winning time: 4h 48' 00"

Results
	Winner	Daniel Van Ryckeghem (BEL)
	Second	Eric Leman (BEL)
	Third	Frans Verbeeck (BEL)

The 1970 Dwars door België was the 26th edition of the Dwars door Vlaanderen cycle race and was held on 22 March 1970. The race started and finished in Waregem. The race was won by Daniel Van Ryckeghem.

== General classification ==
Final general classification

Rank	Rider	Time
1	Daniel Van Ryckeghem (BEL)	4h 48' 00"
2	Eric Leman (BEL)	+ 0"
3	Frans Verbeeck (BEL)	+ 0"
4	Jan van Katwijk (NED)	+ 0"
5	Willy Van Neste (BEL)	+ 0"
6	Walter Planckaert (BEL)	+ 0"
7	André Dierickx (BEL)	+ 0"
8	Willy Donie (BEL)	+ 0"
9	Jaak De Boever (BEL)	+ 2' 40"
10	Wilfried David (BEL)	+ 2' 40"
