= 1980 Dwars door België =

Race details
- Dates: 23 March 1980
- Stages: 1
- Distance: 196 km (121.8 mi)
- Winning time: 5h 08' 00"

Results
	Winner	Johan van der Meer (NED)
	Second	Jan Raas (NED)
	Third	Guido Van Sweevelt (BEL)

The 1980 Dwars door België was the 35th edition of the Dwars door Vlaanderen cycle race and was held on 23 March 1980. The race started and finished in Waregem. The race was won by Johan van der Meer.

== General classification ==
Final general classification

Rank	Rider	Time
1	Johan van der Meer (NED)	5h 08' 00"
2	Jan Raas (NED)	+ 1"
3	Guido Van Sweevelt (BEL)	+ 1"
4	Walter Planckaert (BEL)	+ 1"
5	Willy Planckaert (BEL)	+ 1"
6	Dirk Wayenberg (BEL)	+ 1"
7	Gustaaf Van Roosbroeck (BEL)	+ 1"
8	Patrick Devos (BEL)	+ 1"
9	Patrick Verstraete (BEL)	+ 1"
10	Fedor den Hertog (NED)	+ 1"
