= Tanneken Sconyncx =

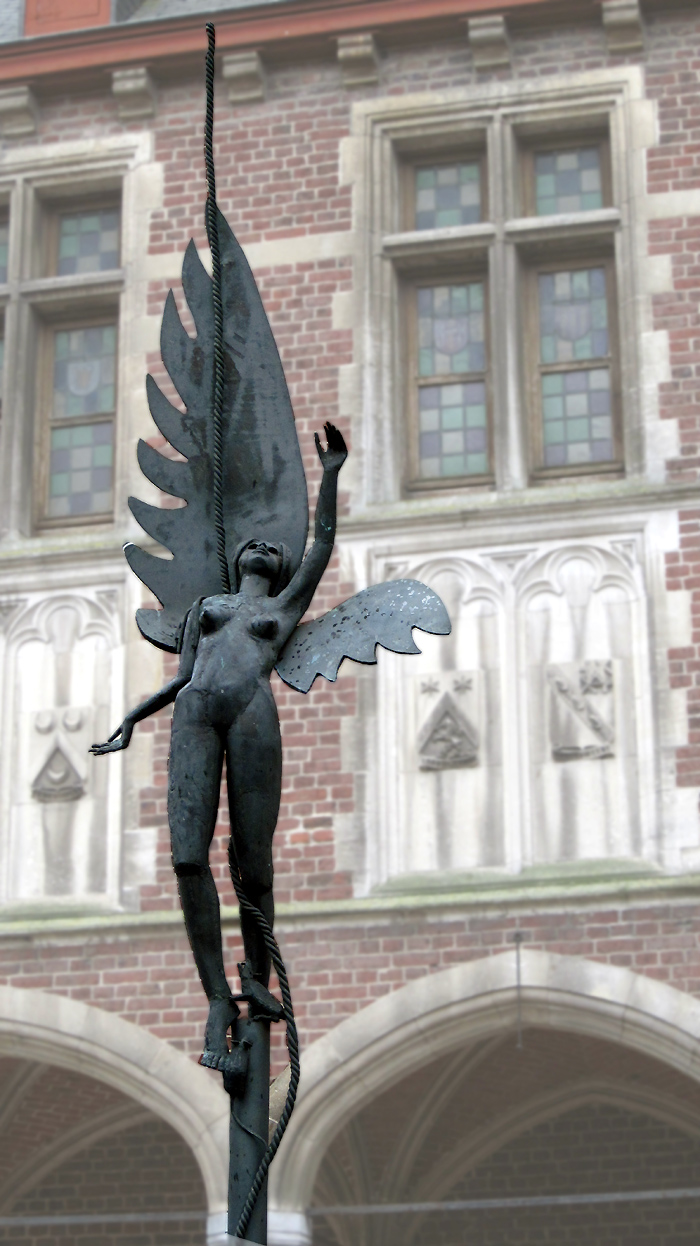
Tanneke Sconyncx.

Tanneken Sconyncx (c. 1560 – 2 June 1603) was an alleged witch from Gottem in the County of Flanders. Her case is among the most notable of the period in what is now Belgium.

== Case ==
Sconyncx was described as a wealthy, beautiful merchant. She was accused of witchcraft by the bailiff in the city of Deinze, who also performed the arrest. She denied the charges and claimed that the bailiff had made his accusation as revenge because she had refused him sexually. She died during torture after having been tortured day and night without respite from 23 May to 2 June.

== Legacy ==
In 1995 a statue of "the witch of Tielt" was placed on the market square of Tielt, West Flanders.
