= Flanders Classics =

Cycling race organizer

Flanders Classics logo (2023)

Flanders Classics is an official cooperation among the organizers of the classic cycle races held in Flanders, Belgium. It was founded in 2009 and comprises seven races, of which the Tour of Flanders, one of the monuments of cycling classics, is considered the most prestigious.

== Mission ==
The mission of the Flanders Classics is to ensure the position of the Flemish Classics in the international cycling calendar. By doing this the organization improves the stature of the smaller Flemish races. The cooperation has already achieved a better date for three of the races: Gent–Wevelgem is now held on the Sunday between Milan–San Remo and the Ronde van Vlaanderen; the Scheldeprijs is held between the Ronde and Paris–Roubaix; and, the Brabantse Pijl is held before the Ardennes classics, which consist of the Amstel Gold Race, La Flèche Wallonne and Liège–Bastogne–Liège.

Since 2021, all six of the classic races held by Flanders Classics have held men's and women's races. From 2023, races offer equal prize money for both men's and women's races. From 2025, Flanders Classics has managed and organised the Amstel Gold Race.

== Cyclo cross ==
Apart from the road Classics, Flanders Classics also organizes cyclo-cross events inside and outside Belgium. Since 2018 Superprestige series has been organized by Flanders Classics in Belgium. Under the auspices of UCI, Flanders Classics also organizes the UCI Cyclo-cross World Cup which takes place in various venues worldwide.

== Classics ==
Cooperating races are:

Men's race	Women's race	Route	Date	Notes
Omloop Het Nieuwsblad		Ghent - Ninove	Late February	First race of the Belgian cycling season.
Gent–Wevelgem		Ghent - Wevelgem	Late March	The first of the three Sunday cobbled classics, held on the Sunday between Milan–San Remo and the Tour of Flanders.
Dwars door Vlaanderen		Roeselare - Waregem	Late March	Until 2017 the first race of the Flemish Cycling Week; since 2018 held between Gent–Wevelgem and the Tour of Flanders.
Tour of Flanders	Tour of Flanders	Antwerp - Oudenaarde	Early April	The pinnacle of the Flemish Cycling Week and the only Flemish race of the five Cycling monuments, held on the first Sunday of April.
Scheldeprijs		Terneuzen - Schoten	Early April	This race is held between the Tour of Flanders and Paris–Roubaix.
Ronde van Limburg	not held	Hasselt - Tongeren-Borgloon	Mid April	Moved from May/June to the Wednesday before Brabantse Pijl in 2025
Brabantse Pijl	Brabantse Pijl	Leuven - Overijse	Mid April	This race is now held before the Ardennes classics.
Amstel Gold Race	Amstel Gold Race	Limburg, Netherlands (Maastricht - Valkenburg)	Mid/late April	only Flanders Classics race out of Belgium (from 2025)
Brussels Cycling Classic	not held	Brussels - Geraardsbergen - Brussels	Early June	Known until 2012 as Paris–Brussels.
Tour de Suisse		Switzerland	Mid June	only partnership

== Results ==
=== Men's races ===
Edition	Omloop Het Nieuwsblad	Dwars door Vlaanderen	Gent–Wevelgem	Tour of Flanders	Scheldeprijs	Brabantse Pijl
2010	Juan Antonio Flecha (ESP)	Matti Breschel (DEN)	Bernhard Eisel (AUT)	Fabian Cancellara (SUI)	Tyler Farrar (USA)	Sébastien Rosseler (BEL)
2011	Sebastian Langeveld (NED)	Nick Nuyens (BEL)	Tom Boonen (BEL)	Nick Nuyens (BEL)	Mark Cavendish (GBR)	Philippe Gilbert (BEL)
2012	Sep Vanmarcke (BEL)	Niki Terpstra (NED)	Tom Boonen (BEL)	Tom Boonen (BEL)	Marcel Kittel (GER)	Thomas Voeckler (FRA)
2013	Luca Paolini (ITA)	Oscar Gatto (ITA)	Peter Sagan (SVK)	Fabian Cancellara (SUI)	Marcel Kittel (GER)	Peter Sagan (SVK)
2014	Ian Stannard (GBR)	Niki Terpstra (NED)	John Degenkolb (GER)	Fabian Cancellara (SUI)	Marcel Kittel (GER)	Philippe Gilbert (BEL)
2015	Ian Stannard (GBR)	Jelle Wallays (BEL)	Luca Paolini (ITA)	Alexander Kristoff (NOR)	Alexander Kristoff (NOR)	Ben Hermans (BEL)
2016	Greg Van Avermaet (BEL)	Jens Debusschere (BEL)	Peter Sagan (SVK)	Peter Sagan (SVK)	Marcel Kittel (GER)	Petr Vakoč (CZE)
2017	Greg Van Avermaet (BEL)	Yves Lampaert (BEL)	Greg Van Avermaet (BEL)	Philippe Gilbert (BEL)	Marcel Kittel (GER)	Sonny Colbrelli (ITA)
2018	Michael Valgren (DEN)	Yves Lampaert (BEL)	Peter Sagan (SVK)	Niki Terpstra (NED)	Fabio Jakobsen (NED)	Tim Wellens (BEL)
2019	Zdeněk Štybar (CZE)	Mathieu van der Poel (NED)	Alexander Kristoff (NOR)	Alberto Bettiol (ITA)	Fabio Jakobsen (NED)	Mathieu van der Poel (NED)
2020	Jasper Stuyven (BEL)	Not held – COVID-19	Mads Pedersen (DEN)	Mathieu van der Poel (NED)	Caleb Ewan (AUS)	Julian Alaphilippe (FRA)
2021	Davide Ballerini (ITA)	Dylan van Baarle (NED)	Wout Van Aert (BEL)	Kasper Asgreen (DEN)	Jasper Philipsen (BEL)	Tom Pidcock (GBR)
2022	Wout Van Aert (BEL)	Mathieu van der Poel (NED)	Biniam Girmay (ERI)	Mathieu van der Poel (NED)	Alexander Kristoff (NOR)	Magnus Sheffield (USA)
2023	Dylan van Baarle (NED)	Christophe Laporte (FRA)	Christophe Laporte (FRA)	Tadej Pogačar (SLO)	Jasper Philipsen (BEL)	Dorian Godon (FRA)
2024	Jan Tratnik (SLO)	Matteo Jorgenson (USA)	Mads Pedersen (DEN)	Mathieu van der Poel (NED)	Tim Merlier (BEL)	Benoît Cosnefroy (FRA)
2025	Søren Wærenskjold (NOR)	Neilson Powless (USA)	Mads Pedersen (DEN)	Tadej Pogačar (SLO)	Tim Merlier (BEL)	Remco Evenepoel (BEL)
2026	Mathieu van der Poel (NED)	Filippo Ganna (ITA)	Jasper Philipsen (BEL)	Tadej Pogačar (SLO)	Tim Merlier (BEL)	Anders Foldager (DEN)
	Omloop Het Nieuwsblad	Dwars door Vlaanderen	Gent–Wevelgem	Tour of Flanders	Scheldeprijs	Brabantse Pijl

=== Women's races ===
Edition	Omloop Het Nieuwsblad	Dwars door Vlaanderen	Gent–Wevelgem	Tour of Flanders	Scheldeprijs	Brabantse Pijl
2010	Emma Johansson (SWE)	Not held	Not held	Grace Verbeke (BEL)	Not held	Not held
2011	Emma Johansson (SWE)	Not held	Not held	Annemiek van Vleuten (NED)	Not held	Not held
2012	Loes Gunnewijk (NED)	Monique van de Ree (NED)	Lizzie Armitstead (GBR)	Judith Arndt (GER)	Not held	Not held
2013	Tiffany Cromwell (AUS)	Kirsten Wild (NED)	Kirsten Wild (NED)	Marianne Vos (NED)	Not held	Not held
2014	Amy Pieters (NED)	Amy Pieters (NED)	Lauren Hall (USA)	Ellen van Dijk (NED)	Not held	Not held
2015	Anna van der Breggen (NED)	Amy Pieters (NED)	Floortje Mackaij (NED)	Elisa Longo Borghini (ITA)	Not held	Not held
2016	Lizzie Armitstead (GBR)	Amy Pieters (NED)	Chantal Blaak (NED)	Lizzie Armitstead (GBR)	Not held	Marianne Vos (NED)
2017	Lucinda Brand (NED)	Lotta Lepistö (FIN)	Lotta Lepistö (FIN)	Coryn Rivera (USA)	Not held	Annette Edmondson (AUS)
2018	Christina Siggaard (DEN)	Ellen van Dijk (NED)	Marta Bastianelli (ITA)	Anna van der Breggen (NED)	Not held	Marta Bastianelli (ITA)
2019	Chantal Blaak (NED)	Ellen van Dijk (NED)	Kirsten Wild (NED)	Marta Bastianelli (ITA)	Not held	Sofie De Vuyst (BEL)
2020	Annemiek van Vleuten (NED)	Not held – COVID-19	Jolien D'Hoore (BEL)	Chantal van den Broek-Blaak (NED)	Not held	Grace Brown (AUS)
2021	Anna van der Breggen (NED)	Annemiek van Vleuten (NED)	Marianne Vos (NED)	Annemiek van Vleuten (NED)	Lorena Wiebes (NED)	Ruth Winder (USA)
2022	Annemiek van Vleuten (NED)	Chiara Consonni (ITA)	Elisa Balsamo (ITA)	Lotte Kopecky (BEL)	Lorena Wiebes (NED)	Demi Vollering (NED)
2023	Lotte Kopecky (BEL)	Demi Vollering (NED)	Marlen Reusser (SUI)	Lotte Kopecky (BEL)	Lorena Wiebes (NED)	Silvia Persico (ITA)
2024	Marianne Vos (NED)	Marianne Vos (NED)	Lorena Wiebes (NED)	Elisa Longo Borghini (ITA)	Lorena Wiebes (NED)	Elisa Longo Borghini (ITA)
2025	Lotte Claes (BEL)	Elisa Longo Borghini (ITA)	Lorena Wiebes (NED)	Lotte Kopecky (BEL)	Elisa Balsamo (ITA)	Elisa Longo Borghini (ITA)
2026	Demi Vollering (NED)	Marlen Reusser (SUI)	Lorena Wiebes (NED)	Demi Vollering (NED)	Charlotte Kool (NED)	Célia Gery (FRA)
	Omloop Het Nieuwsblad	Dwars door Vlaanderen	Gent–Wevelgem	Tour of Flanders	Scheldeprijs	Brabantse Pijl
