= 1963 Dwars door België =

Race details
- Dates: 6–7 April 1963
- Stages: 2
- Distance: 428 km (265.9 mi)

Results
	Winner	Clément Roman (BEL)
	Second	Dieter Puschel (FRG)
	Third	Robert Seneca (BEL)

The 1963 Dwars door België was the 19th edition of the Dwars door Vlaanderen cycle race and was held on 6–7 April 1963. The race started and finished in Waregem. The race was won by Clément Roman.

== General classification ==
Final general classification

Rank	Rider	Points
1	Clément Roman (BEL)	7
2	Dieter Puschel (FRG)	13
3	Robert Seneca (BEL)	17
4	Joseph Dewit (BEL)	22
5	Joseph Bosmans (BEL)	23
6	Jose Thumas (BEL)	23
7	Lambert Van De Ven (NED)	24
8	Gilbert Maes (BEL)	27
9	Willy Raes (BEL)	30
10	Willy Butzen (BEL)	30
