= Frans Van Looy =

Belgian cyclist

- Van Looy in 1977

Personal information
- Full name: Frans Van Looy
- Born: 26 August 1950 Merksem, Belgium
- Died: 20 September 2019 (aged 69) Merksem, Belgium
- Height: 1.79 m (5 ft 10 1/2 in)
- Weight: 75 kg (165 lb; 11 st 11 lb)

Cycling career
- Sport: Cycling
- Discipline: Road
- Role: Rider (retired); Assistant team manager (retired)
- Rider type: Sprinter

Professional teams
- 1972–1973: Novy–Dubble Bubble
- 1974: Carpenter–Confortluxe–Flandria
- 1975–1976: Molteni–RYC
- 1977: Maes Pils–Mini-Flat
- 1978: Mini-Flat–Boule d'Or
- 1979: Kas–Campagnolo
- 1980–1981: Vermeer Thijs–Mini-Flat
- 1982: Europ Decor

Managerial teams
- 1983: Perlav–Eurosoap
- 1984–1987: TeVe Blad–Eddy Merckx
- 1988–1991: Histor–Sigma
- 1992–2006: Team Telekom

Frans Van Looy (26 August 1950 – 20 September 2019) was a Belgian cyclist. Looy was professional from 1972 to 1982. He competed in the individual road race at the 1972 Summer Olympics.

After his career as a cyclist, Van Looy worked as a team manager with Team Telekom and T-Mobile until 2006 and had helped run his family's farm in Merksem. However, a local government order ruled that Van Looy could no longer live at the farm, despite a petition signed by 3,000 people to preserve the residence that Van Looy had been born in. After this order, which ruled his birthplace to be uninhabitable and led to his eviction, he committed suicide in September 2019.

== Major wins ==
1972
4th Nationale Sluitingsprijs
1973
1st Stage 6 Volta a la Comunitat Valenciana
1st Stage 1 Tour du Nord
1st Stage 1 Vuelta a Mallorca
2nd Omloop van Oost-Vlaanderen
5th Nationale Sluitingsprijs
9th Grote Prijs Stad Zottegem
10th Grand Prix de Denain
1974
1st Schaal Sels
1st Nationale Sluitingsprijs
1st Stage 3 Critérium du Dauphiné Libéré
7th E3 Harelbeke
8th Dwars door België
1975
2nd GP du Tournaisis
2nd Paris–Tours
3rd Tour du Condroz
3rd Schaal Sels
3rd Coppa Ugo Agostoni
5th Kampioenschap van Vlaanderen
6th Nationale Sluitingsprijs
8th Scheldeprijs
1976
1st Ronde van Limburg
1st Leeuwse Pijl
3rd Omloop van het Leiedal
4th Scheldeprijs
4th Omloop van de Vlaamse Scheldeboorden
4th Paris–Tours
9th Eschborn–Frankfurt
9th Kampioenschap van Vlaanderen
1977
1st Nokere Koerse
1st Nationale Sluitingsprijs
3rd Halle–Ingooigem
5th Tour du Condroz
8th Overall Three Days of Bruges–De Panne
8th Grand Prix d'Isbergues
1978
1st De Kustpijl
1st GP Victor Standaert
1st Grote Prijs Jef Scherens
1st Stage 3a Volta Ciclista a Catalunya
2nd GP du Tournaisis
5th Overall Tour of Belgium
6th Omloop van Oost-Vlaanderen
8th Schaal Sels
9th Overall Three Days of Bruges–De Panne

1st Stage 3

10th De Brabantse Pijl
1979
1st Stage 2 Vuelta a Aragón
1st Nationale Sluitingsprijs
2nd Grand Prix de Momignies
3rd De Kustpijl
3rd GP Victor Standaert
1980
1st Halle–Ingooigem
2nd De Kustpijl
2nd Grote Prijs Jef Scherens
4th Nokere Koerse
10th Belgian National Road Race Championships
1981
3rd De Kustpijl
7th Nokere Koerse
1982
3rd De Kustpijl

=== Grand Tour general classification results timeline ===
Grand Tour	1974	1975	1976	1977	1978	1979
Vuelta a España	Did not contest during his career					
Giro d'Italia	—	—	71	—	—	—
Tour de France	99	—	—	—	—	DNF

Legend
DSQ	Disqualified
DNF	Did not finish
