= 1973 La Flèche Wallonne =

Race details
- Dates: 19 April 1973
- Stages: 1
- Distance: 249 km (154.7 mi)
- Winning time: 6h 49' 33"

Results
	Winner	André Dierickx (BEL)	(Flandria–Carpenter–Shimano)
	Second	Eddy Merckx (BEL)	(Molteni)
	Third	Frans Verbeeck (BEL)	(Watney–Maes Pils)

The 1973 La Flèche Wallonne was the 37th edition of La Flèche Wallonne cycle race and was held on 19 April 1973. The race started in Verviers and finished in Marcinelle. The race was won by André Dierickx of the Flandria team.

== General classification ==
Final general classification

Rank	Rider	Team	Time
1	André Dierickx (BEL)	Flandria–Carpenter–Shimano	6h 49' 33"
2	Eddy Merckx (BEL)	Molteni	+ 1' 10"
3	Frans Verbeeck (BEL)	Watney–Maes Pils	+ 1' 10"
4	Walter Planckaert (BEL)	Watney–Maes Pils	+ 1' 10"
5	Georges Pintens (BEL)	Rokado–De Gribaldy	+ 1' 10"
6	Cyrille Guimard (FRA)	Gan–Mercier–Hutchinson	+ 1' 10"
7	Walter Godefroot (BEL)	Flandria–Carpenter–Shimano	+ 1' 10"
8	Roger Rosiers (BEL)	Bic	+ 1' 10"
9	Francesco Moser (ITA)	Filotex	+ 1' 10"
10	Herman Van Springel (BEL)	Rokado–De Gribaldy	+ 1' 10"
