= 1971 Scheldeprijs =

Race details
- Dates: 27 July 1971
- Stages: 1
- Distance: 242 km (150.4 mi)
- Winning time: 5h 45' 00"

Results
	Winner	Gustaaf Van Roosbroeck (BEL)
	Second	Frans Mintjens (BEL)
	Third	Johan De Muynck (BEL)

The 1971 Scheldeprijs was the 58th edition of the Scheldeprijs cycle race and was held on 27 July 1971. The race was won by Gustaaf Van Roosbroeck.

== General classification ==
Final general classification

Rank	Rider	Time
1	Gustaaf Van Roosbroeck (BEL)	5h 45' 00"
2	Frans Mintjens (BEL)	+ 20"
3	Johan De Muynck (BEL)	+ 20"
4	Roger Kindt (BEL)	+ 2' 25"
5	Jos van Beers (NED)	+ 2' 25"
6	Frans Verbeeck (BEL)	+ 2' 25"
7	André Dierickx (BEL)	+ 2' 25"
8	Roger Rosiers (BEL)	+ 2' 25"
9	Rik Van Linden (BEL)	+ 2' 25"
10	Jos Huysmans (BEL)	+ 2' 25"
