= 1979 Dwars door België =

Race details
- Dates: 25 March 1979
- Stages: 1
- Distance: 198 km (123.0 mi)
- Winning time: 4h 44' 00"

Results
	Winner	Gustaaf Van Roosbroeck (BEL)
	Second	Walter Planckaert (BEL)
	Third	Jan Raas (NED)

The 1979 Dwars door België was the 34th edition of the Dwars door Vlaanderen cycle race and was held on 25 March 1979. The race started and finished in Waregem. The race was won by Gustaaf Van Roosbroeck.

== General classification ==
Final general classification

Rank	Rider	Time
1	Gustaaf Van Roosbroeck (BEL)	4h 44' 00"
2	Walter Planckaert (BEL)	+ 1' 45"
3	Jan Raas (NED)	+ 2' 02"
4	Marc Demeyer (BEL)	+ 2' 02"
5	Guido Van Sweevelt (BEL)	+ 2' 02"
6	Frank Hoste (BEL)	+ 2' 02"
7	Sean Kelly (IRL)	+ 2' 02"
8	Walter Godefroot (BEL)	+ 2' 02"
9	Jean-Luc Vandenbroucke (BEL)	+ 2' 02"
10	Martin Havik (NED)	+ 2' 02"
