= 1961 Dwars door België =

Race details
- Dates: 29–30 April 1961
- Stages: 2
- Distance: 432 km (268.4 mi)

Results
| | Winner | Maurice Meuleman (BEL) |
| | Second | Roman van Wynsberghe (BEL) |
| | Third | Leon Vandaele (BEL) |

The 1961 Dwars door België was the 17th edition of the Dwars door Vlaanderen cycle race and was held on 29–30 April 1961. The race started and finished in Waregem. The race was won by Maurice Meuleman.

== General classification ==
Final general classification

| Rank | Rider | Points |
|---|---|---|
| 1 | Maurice Meuleman (BEL) | 11 |
| 2 | Roman van Wynsberghe (BEL) | 17 |
| 3 | Leon Vandaele (BEL) | 17 |
| 4 | Albert Daenekindt (BEL) | 19 |
| 5 | Joseph Bosmans (BEL) | 20 |
| 6 | Jan Zagers (BEL) | 21 |
| 7 | Jan Van Gompel (BEL) | 23 |
| 8 | Roger Vindevogel (BEL) | 26 |
| 9 | Kamiel Lamote (BEL) | 27 |
| 10 | André Noyelle (BEL) | 30 |
