= 1968 Harelbeke–Antwerp–Harelbeke =

Race details
- Dates: 23 March 1968
- Stages: 1
- Distance: 216 km (134 mi)
- Winning time: 5h 32' 00"

Results
	Winner	Jaak De Boever (BEL)
	Second	Jos Huysmans (BEL)
	Third	Herman Van Springel (BEL)

The 1968 Harelbeke–Antwerp–Harelbeke (Note: The race was known as Harelbeke–Antwerp–Harelbeke (French: Harelbeke–Anvers–Harelbeke) for the first twelve editions. In 1970, the race became known as the E3, after the Belgian road which is now known as the E17.) was the 11th edition of the E3 Harelbeke cycle race and was held on 23 March 1968. The race started and finished in Harelbeke. The race was won by Jaak De Boever.

== General classification ==
Final general classification

Rank	Rider	Time
1	Jaak De Boever (BEL)	5h 32' 00"
2	Jos Huysmans (BEL)	+ 0"
3	Herman Van Springel (BEL)	+ 50"
4	Eric Leman (BEL)	+ 50"
5	Daniel Van Ryckeghem (BEL)	+ 1' 50"
6	Gerben Karstens (NED)	+ 1' 50"
7	Valere Van Sweevelt (BEL)	+ 1' 50"
8	Harry Steevens (NED)	+ 1' 50"
9	Jan Janssen (NED)	+ 1' 50"
10	Wim Schepers (NED)	+ 1' 50"
