= 1978 Grote Prijs Jef Scherens =

Race details
- Dates: 17 September 1978
- Stages: 1
- Distance: 221 km (137.3 mi)
- Winning time: 5h 03' 00"

Results
	Winner	Frans Van Looy (BEL)
	Second	Gustaaf Van Roosbroeck (BEL)
	Third	Frank Hoste (BEL)

The 1978 Grote Prijs Jef Scherens was the 14th edition of the Grote Prijs Jef Scherens cycle race and was held on 17 September 1978. The race started and finished in Leuven. The race was won by Frans Van Looy.

== General classification ==
Final general classification

Rank	Rider	Time
1	Frans Van Looy (BEL)	5h 03' 00"
2	Gustaaf Van Roosbroeck (BEL)	+ 0"
3	Frank Hoste (BEL)	+ 0"
4	Guido Van Sweevelt (BEL)	+ 0"
5	Jos Jacobs (BEL)	+ 0"
6	Herman Van Springel (BEL)	+ 0"
7	Alfons De Bal (BEL)	+ 0"
8	Ludwig Wijnants (BEL)	+ 0"
9	Gery Verlinden (BEL)	+ 0"
10	Jos Schipper (NED)	+ 0"
