= Guido Van Sweevelt =

Belgian cyclist

Personal information
- Born: 15 August 1949 (age 77) Mortsel, Belgium

Cycling career
- Sport: Cycling
- Current team: Retired
- Discipline: Road
- Role: Rider

Professional teams
- 1972: Van Cauter–Magniflex–de Gribaldy
- 1973–1975: Watney–Maes Pils
- 1976–1982: IJsboerke–Colnago

Major wins
- Stage races Three Days of De Panne (1978)

Guido Van Sweevelt (born 15 August 1949) is a Belgian former professional road bicycle racer. Professional from 1972 to 1982, he won the Three Days of De Panne in 1978.

== Major results ==
1971
1st Stage 13 Peace Race
1972
5th Milano–Vignola
8th Omloop van de Fruitstreek
1973
1st Stage 5a Tour of Belgium
2nd Omloop Mandel-Leie-Schelde
7th Overall Tour du Nord
1974
4th Grand Prix de Wallonie
6th Omloop van Oost-Vlaanderen
1975
1st Ronde van Limburg
1st Stage 5b Tour of Belgium
1st Prologue (TTT) Tour de Luxembourg
8th E3 Prijs Vlaanderen
9th Paris–Roubaix
1976
1st Hyon–Mons
3rd Grand Prix Cerami
6th Ronde van Limburg
1977
2nd Overall Tour of Belgium
3rd Overall Three Days of De Panne
4th Kampioenschap van Vlaanderen
8th Ronde van Limburg
8th Grand Prix Cerami
8th Omloop van Oost-Vlaanderen
1978
1st Overall Three Days of De Panne
3rd Overall Étoile de Bessèges
3rd Dwars door België
3rd Omloop van het Leiedal
4th Grote Prijs Jef Scherens
4th GP de Fourmies
5th Kampioenschap van Vlaanderen
7th Paris–Roubaix
7th Schaal Sels
1979
1st Ronde van Limburg
5th Dwars door België
5th Grote Prijs Stad Zottegem
1980
1st Stage 2 Four Days of Dunkirk
3rd Dwars door België
3rd Kampioenschap van Vlaanderen
3rd Grote Prijs Stad Zottegem
1981
5th Dwars door België
8th Overall Three Days of De Panne
8th Ronde van Limburg
10th Nationale Sluitingprijs
1982
2nd GP Stad Vilvoorde
2nd Grote Prijs Raymond Impanis
3rd Schaal Sels
7th Grand Prix Cerami
7th Ronde van Limburg
