= 1968 Dwars door België =

Race details
- Dates: 24 March 1968
- Stages: 1
- Distance: 200 km (124.3 mi)
- Winning time: 5h 19' 00"

Results
	Winner	Walter Godefroot (BEL)
	Second	Willy Monty (BEL)
	Third	Bernard Van de Kerckhove (BEL)

The 1968 Dwars door België was the 24th edition of the Dwars door Vlaanderen cycle race and was held on 24 March 1968. The race started and finished in Waregem. The race was won by Walter Godefroot.

== General classification ==
Final general classification

Rank	Rider	Time
1	Walter Godefroot (BEL)	5h 19' 00"
2	Willy Monty (BEL)	+ 0"
3	Bernard Van de Kerckhove (BEL)	+ 0"
4	Victor Van Schil (BEL)	+ 5"
5	Julien Stevens (BEL)	+ 1' 25"
6	Erik De Vlaeminck (BEL)	+ 2' 05"
7	Gustaaf De Smet (BEL)	+ 2' 10"
8	Jo de Roo (NED)	+ 2' 10"
9	Romain De Loof (BEL)	+ 2' 10"
10	Daniel Van Ryckeghem (BEL)	+ 2' 10"
