= Jaak De Boever =

Belgian cyclist

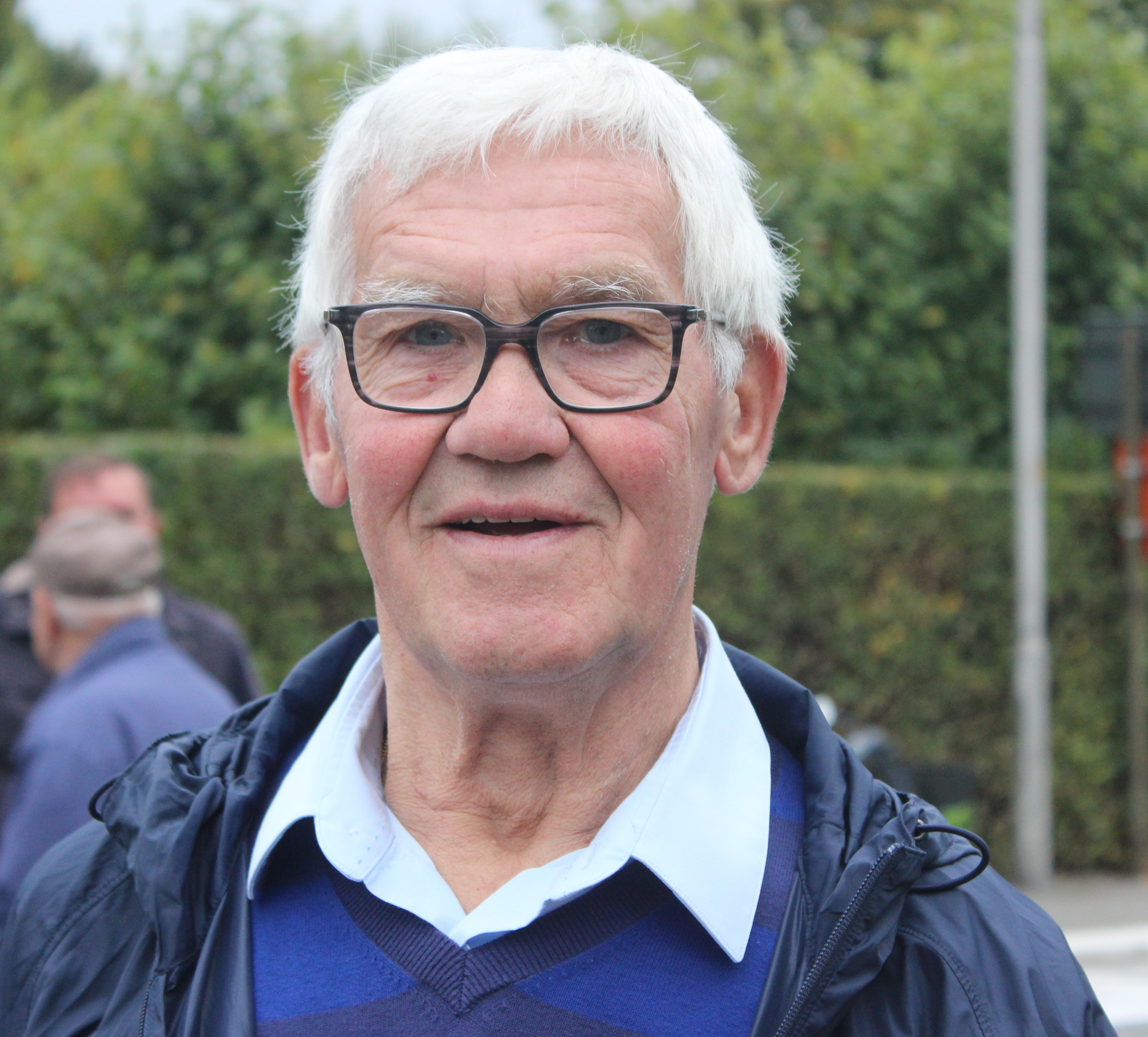

Personal information
- Born: 29 August 1937 (age 89) Gottem, Belgium

Cycling career
- Sport: Cycling
- Discipline: Road
- Role: Rider

Professional teams
- 1960–1961: Wiel's–Flandria
- 1962: Liberia–Grammont–Wolber
- 1963: Solo–Terrot
- 1964–1966: Wiel's–Groene Leeuw
- 1967–1968: Roméo–Smith's
- 1969–1971: Flandria–De Clerck–Krüger
- 1972: Bic
- 1973: Peugeot–BP–Michelin

Jaak De Boever (born 29 August 1937) is a Belgian former professional racing cyclist. He won the 1968 E3 Harelbeke.

== Major results ==
1961
1st Tielt–Antwerpen–Tielt
1st Omloop der Zuid-West-Vlaamse Bergen
1962
1st Tielt–Antwerpen–Tielt
1st Stadsprijs Geraardsbergen
1963
2nd Omloop van het Leiedal
2nd Ronde van Oost-Vlaanderen
2nd Antwerpen - Ougrée
1964
1st Tielt–Antwerpen–Tielt
1st Omloop van Midden-Vlaanderen
1st Stage 2b Dwars door Vlaanderen
3rd Circuit des Frontières
1965
1st Stadsprijs Geraardsbergen
1st Roubaix-Cassel-Roubaix
1st Stage 2b Tour du Nord
2nd Tielt–Antwerpen–Tielt
2nd Omloop van het Houtland
1966
1st Roubaix-Cassel-Roubaix
1st Tielt–Antwerpen–Tielt
1st Nokere Koerse
3rd Overall Tour du Nord
3rd Omloop Mandel-Leie-Schelde
3rd Grote Prijs Marcel Kint
6th Grand Prix Cerami
1967
1st GP Stad Vilvoorde
2nd Nokere Koerse
3rd Ronde van Oost-Vlaanderen
5th Overall Paris–Nice
8th Gent–Wevelgem
1968
1st 1968 E3 Harelbeke
2nd Stadsprijs Geraardsbergen
10th Gent–Wevelgem
1969
1st Stage 1b Critérium du Dauphiné Libéré
1st Stage 4 Four Days of Dunkirk
1st Circuit de la Région Linière
2nd Omloop van Centraal-Vlaanderen
3rd De Kustpijl
1970
1st Stage 5a Critérium du Dauphiné Libéré
2nd Grote Prijs Marcel Kint
1972
3rd Omloop van het Houtland
3rd GP Stad Vilvoorde
