= 1965 Dwars door België =

Race details
- Dates: 19 April 1965
- Stages: 1
- Distance: 203 km (126.1 mi)
- Winning time: 5h 30' 00"

Results
	Winner	Alfons Hermans (BEL)
	Second	Julien Haelterman (BEL)
	Third	Roger De Breuker (BEL)

The 1965 Dwars door België was the 21st edition of the Dwars door Vlaanderen cycle race and was held on 19 April 1965. The race started and finished in Waregem. The race was won by Alfons Hermans.

== General classification ==
Final general classification

Rank	Rider	Time
1	Alfons Hermans (BEL)	5h 30' 00"
2	Julien Haelterman (BEL)	+ 1' 15"
3	Roger De Breuker (BEL)	+ 1' 15"
4	Joseph Janssens (BEL)	+ 2' 10"
5	Romain Van Wijnsberghe (BEL)	+ 2' 10"
6	Robert De Middeleir (BEL)	+ 2' 15"
7	Eric Esprit (BEL)	+ 2' 15"
8	Raf Gijsel (NED)	+ 2' 15"
9	Charly Gaul (LUX)	+ 2' 15"
10	Leon Verkindere (BEL)	+ 2' 15"
