= 1962 Dwars door België =

Race details
- Dates: 21–22 April 1962
- Stages: 2
- Distance: 442 km (274.6 mi)
- Winning time: 11h 45' 32"

Results
	Winner	Martin Van Geneugden (BEL)
	Second	Piet Rentmeester (NED)
	Third	Piet van Est (NED)

The 1962 Dwars door België was the 18th edition of the Dwars door Vlaanderen cycle race and was held on 21–22 April 1962. The race started and finished in Waregem. The race was won by Martin Van Geneugden.

== General classification ==
Final general classification

Rank	Rider	Points
1	Martin Van Geneugden (BEL)	5
2	Piet Rentmeester (NED)	13
3	Piet van Est (NED)	17
4	Norbert Kerckhove (BEL)	24
5	Julien Gekiere (BEL)	37
6	Daniel Doom (BEL)	38
7	André Messelis (BEL)	50
8	Eddy Pauwels (BEL)	51
9	Raymond Impanis (BEL)	55
10	Victor Van Schil (BEL)	60
