= 1980 Grote Prijs Jef Scherens =

Race details
- Dates: 21 September 1980
- Stages: 1
- Distance: 214 km (133.0 mi)
- Winning time: 4h 57' 00"

Results
	Winner	Ludo Delcroix (BEL)
	Second	Frans Van Looy (BEL)
	Third	Etienne Van der Helst (BEL)

The 1980 Grote Prijs Jef Scherens was the 16th edition of the Grote Prijs Jef Scherens cycle race and was held on 21 September 1980. The race started and finished in Leuven. The race was won by Ludo Delcroix.

== General classification ==
Final general classification

Rank	Rider	Time
1	Ludo Delcroix (BEL)	4h 57' 00"
2	Frans Van Looy (BEL)	+ 1' 25"
3	Etienne Van der Helst (BEL)	+ 1' 50"
4	Eric Van De Wiele (BEL)	+ 1' 50"
5	Eddy Verstraeten (BEL)	+ 1' 50"
6	Marc Demeyer (BEL)	+ 2' 20"
7	Patrick Lerno (BEL)	+ 2' 20"
8	Roger De Cnijf (BEL)	+ 2' 20"
9	Ronan De Meyer (BEL)	+ 2' 20"
10	Emiel Gijsemans (BEL)	+ 2' 20"
