= Dwars door Vlaanderen =

Belgian one-day road cycling race

Race details
- Date: Late March, begin April
- Region: Flanders, Belgium
- English name: Across Flanders
- Local name: Dwars door Vlaanderen (in Dutch)
- Discipline: Road
- Competition: UCI World Tour; UCI Women's World Tour
- Type: Semi-classic one-day race
- Organiser: Flanders Classics
- Web site: www.ddvl.eu

Men's history
- First edition: 1945
- Editions: 80 (as of 2026)
- First winner: Rik Van Steenbergen (BEL)
- Most wins: 14 riders with 2 wins each
- Most recent: Filippo Ganna (ITA)

Women's history
- First edition: 2012
- Editions: 14 (as of 2026)
- First winner: Monique van de Ree (NED)
- Most wins: Amy Pieters (NED) (3 wins)
- Most recent: Marlen Reusser (SUI)

Dwars door Vlaanderen ('Across Flanders') is a semi-classic road bicycle race in Belgium, held annually since 1945. The race starts in Roeselare and finishes in Waregem, both in West Flanders.

Held in late March, the event is part of the Flemish Cycling Week, which also includes E3 Harelbeke, Gent–Wevelgem and the Tour of Flanders. Traditionally Dwars door Vlaanderen was held four days after Milan–San Remo and a week and a half before the Tour of Flanders. As from 2018, the race moved up one week on the international calendar and is now contested on the Wednesday before the Tour of Flanders, Flanders's foremost cycling classic, held on Sunday. Since 2017 the men's race has been part of the UCI World Tour.

Since 2012, a women's edition of Dwars door Vlaanderen is held on the same day as the men's race, starting and finishing on the same location, over a shorter distance. This was part of the UCI Women's ProSeries (the second tier of women's races) between 2023 and 2025, and was elevated to the UCI Women's World Tour in 2026.

Both events are organized by Flanders Classics. In addition the Grand Prix de Waregem was formerly regarded as the Under 23 version of the race.

== History ==
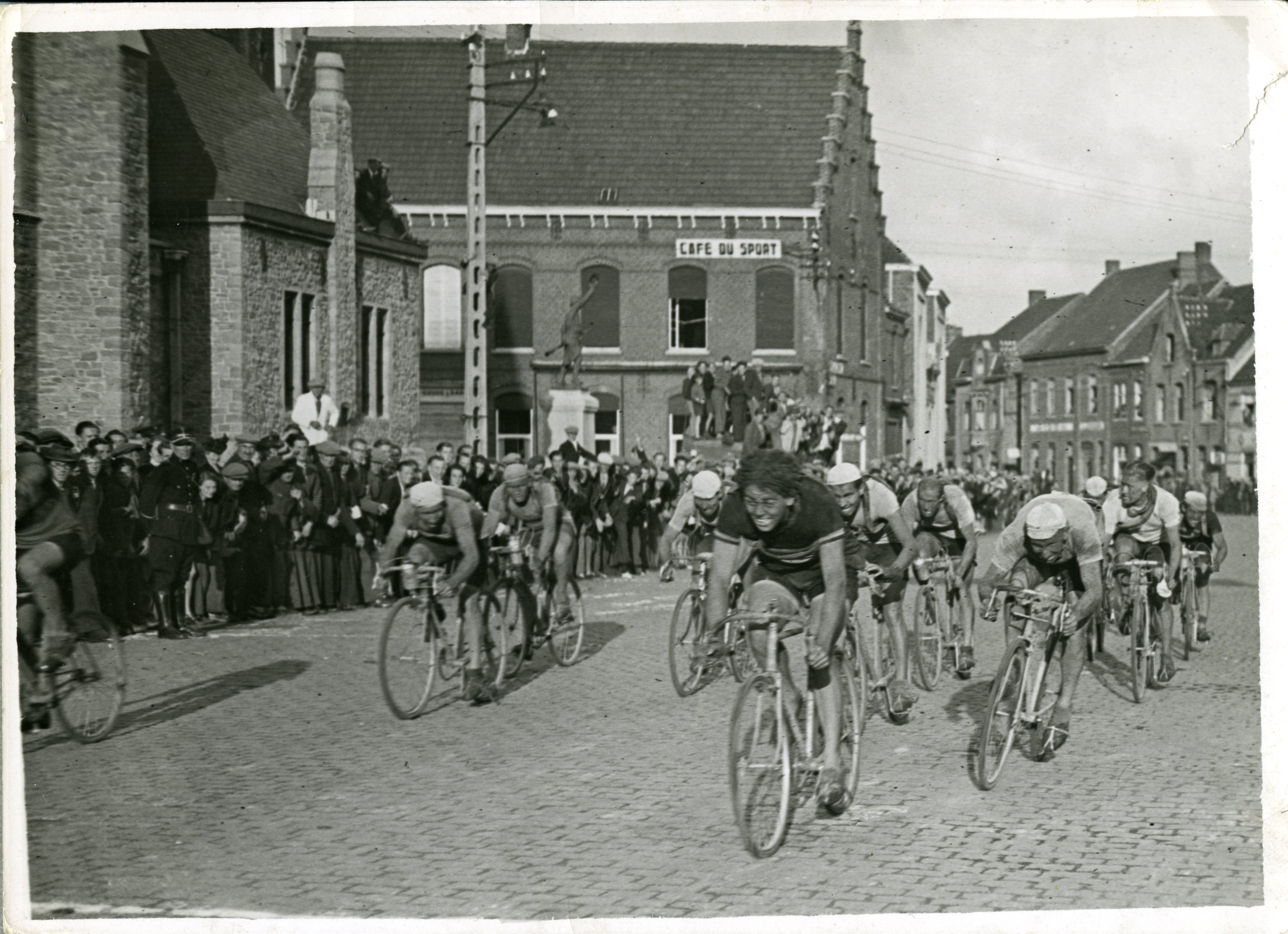
Rik Van Steenbergen winning the inaugural Dwars Door België in 1945

=== Dwars door België ===
The race was first run in 1945 from Sint-Truiden to Waregem and was named Dwars door België (English: Across Belgium) – a name it kept until 1999. Belgian cycling icon Rik Van Steenbergen won the inaugural race. From 1946 to 1964 the event was run as a stage race over two days – with the exception of 1948. The first stage started in Waregem and finished in the eastern Belgian provinces of Limburg or Liège; from which it returned to Waregem the next day. In 1948 and since 1965, it has been held as a one-day race. Two editions have been cancelled, in 1971 and during the COVID-19 pandemic.

Held in late March, the event traditionally marked the start of the Flemish Cycling Week, which also includes E3 Harelbeke, Gent–Wevelgem, the Three Days of De Panne, and the Tour of Flanders. Dwars door Vlaanderen was contested mid-week, four days after Italy's monument race Milan–San Remo and a week and a half before the Tour of Flanders.

=== World Tour race ===
In 2000 the event was renamed Dwars door Vlaanderen and Roeselare became the new starting place. The race was included in the inaugural UCI Europe Tour in 2005, classified as a UCI 1.1 event, and from 2013 to 2016 as a 1.HC race. The 2016 edition nearly had to be cancelled as it was scheduled one day after the 2016 Brussels bombings, causing security alert to be raised to the highest level in all of Belgium. On the evening of the event, organizers decided to continue as planned and the Belgian authorities gave clearance on the day of the race. The race was won by Jens Debusschere.

The 2017 edition was promoted to the UCI World Tour, cycling's highest tier of professional races. In 2018 Dwars door Vlaanderen was moved one week later on the calendar, from a position mid-week after Milan–San Remo to the Wednesday before the Tour of Flanders. At the same time the course was scaled down from 200 km to 180 km in length, and the Oude Kwaremont and Paterberg climbs were cut from the race.

=== Women's race ===
Since 2012, a women's edition of Dwars door Vlaanderen is held on the same day as the men's race, starting and finishing on the same location, of approximately 130 kilometres distance. From 2023, this event joined the UCI Women's ProSeries calendar, the second tier of women's races. In 2026, the race moved up to the UCI Women's World Tour.

As with the men's race, Dwars door Vlaanderen is seen as a warm up event for the Tour of Flanders for Women.

== Route ==
Dwars door Vlaanderen is one of several cobbled races in Flanders during Spring classics season. The race starts in Roeselare and finishes in Waregem, for a total distance of ca. 180 km. The bulk of the course is set in the hilly Flemish Ardennes.

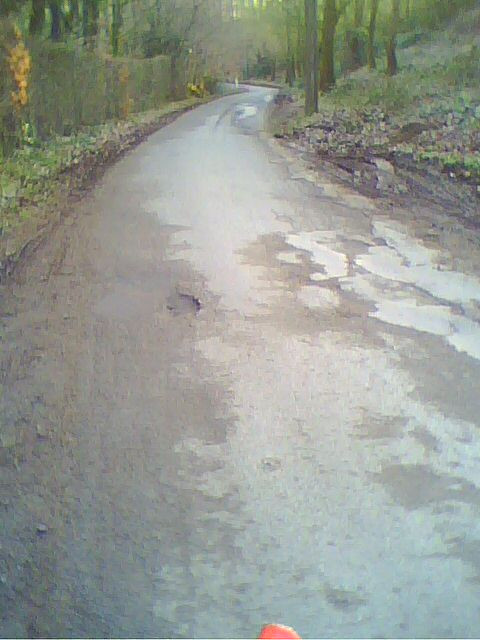
Since 2018 the Côte de Trieu in Mont-de-l'Enclus features three times in Dwars door Vlaanderen. The third ascent comes as one of the last climbs in the race, at 33 km from the finish, acting as a decisive launchpad.

The first 80 km in West Flanders are mainly flat, after which the course becomes more selective with a dozen climbs in the hill zone in East Flanders. Despite annual changes, some of the regular climbs in the race are the Taaienberg, Kruisberg and Côte de Trieu. The top of the last climb, Nokereberg, comes at 11 km from the finish. Additionally, there are several flat stretches of cobbles. Due to its hilly course in the Flemish Ardennes, the race is similar in nature to the Tour of Flanders, and is often used in preparation for the bigger event four days later.

== Men's race winners ==
Year	Country	Rider	Team
↓ **"Dwars door België"** ↓
1945	Belgium	Rik Van Steenbergen	Mercier–Hutchinson
1946	Belgium	Maurice Desimpelaere	Alcyon–Dunlop
1947	Belgium	Albert Sercu	Bertin–Wolber
1948	Belgium	André Rosseel	Alcyon–Dunlop
1949	Belgium	Raymond Impanis	Alcyon–Dunlop
1950	Belgium	André Rosseel	Alcyon–Dunlop
1951	Belgium	Raymond Impanis	Alcyon–Dunlop
1952	Belgium	André Maelbrancke	Peugeot–Dunlop
1953	Belgium	Briek Schotte	Alcyon–Dunlop
1954	Belgium	Germain Derycke	Alcyon–Dunlop
1955	Belgium	Briek Schotte	Alcyon–Dunlop
1956	Belgium	Lucien Demunster	Elvé–Peugeot
1957	Belgium	Noël Foré	Groene Leeuw
1958	Belgium	André Vlayen	Elvé–Peugeot–Marvan
1959	Belgium	Roger Baens	Peugeot–Dunlop
1960	Belgium	Arthur Decabooter	Groene Leeuw
1961	Belgium	Maurice Meuleman	Wiel's–Flandria
1962	Belgium	Martin Van Geneugden	Flandria–Faema–Clément
1963	Belgium	Clément Roman	Faema–Flandria
1964	Netherlands	Piet van Est	Televizier
1965	Belgium	Alfons Hermans	Lamot–Libertas
1966	Belgium	Walter Godefroot	Wiel's–Groene Leeuw
1967	Belgium	Daniël Vanryckeghem	Mann–Grundig
1968	Belgium	Walter Godefroot	Flandria–De Clerck
1969	Belgium	Eric Leman	Flandria–De Clerck–Krüger
1970	Belgium	Daniël Vanryckeghem	Mann–Grundig
1971	**No race**		
1972	Belgium	Marc Demeyer	Beaulieu–Flandria
1973	Belgium	Roger Loysch	Watney–Maes
1974	Belgium	Louis Verreydt	IJsboerke–Colner
1975	Netherlands	Cees Priem	Frisol–G.B.C.
1976	Belgium	Willy Planckaert	Maes–Rokado
1977	Belgium	Walter Planckaert	Maes–Mini Flat
1978	Netherlands	Jos Schipper	Marc Zeepcentrale–Superia
1979	Belgium	Gustaaf Van Roosbroeck	IJsboerke–Warncke
1980	Netherlands	Johan van der Meer	HB Alarmsystemen
1981	Belgium	Frank Hoste	TI–Raleigh–Creda
1982	Netherlands	Jan Raas	TI–Raleigh–Campagnolo
1983	Belgium	Etienne De Wilde	La Redoute–Motobécane
1984	Belgium	Walter Planckaert	Panasonic–Raleigh
1985	Belgium	Eddy Planckaert	Panasonic–Raleigh
1986	Belgium	Eric Vanderaerden	Panasonic–Merckx–Agu
1987	Netherlands	Jelle Nijdam	Superconfex–Kwantum–Yoko–Colnago
1988	Netherlands	John Talen	Panasonic–Isostar–Colnago–Agu
1989	Belgium	Dirk De Wolf	Hitachi
1990	Belgium	Edwig Van Hooydonck	Buckler–Colnago–Decca
1991	Belgium	Eric Vanderaerden	Buckler–Colnago–Decca
1992	Germany	Olaf Ludwig	Panasonic–Sportlife
1993	Belgium	Johan Museeuw	GB–MG Maglificio
1994	Belgium	Carlo Bomans	GB–MG Maglificio
1995	Netherlands	Jelle Nijdam	TVM–Polis Direct
1996	Netherlands	Tristan Hoffman	TVM–Farm Frites
1997	Ukraine	Andrei Tchmil	Lotto–Mobistar–Isoglass
1998	Belgium	Tom Steels	Mapei–Bricobi
1999	Belgium	Johan Museeuw	Mapei–Quick-Step
↓ **"Dwars door Vlaanderen"** ↓
2000	Netherlands	Tristan Hoffman	Memory Card–Jack & Jones
2001	Belgium	Niko Eeckhout	Lotto–Adecco
2002	Australia	Baden Cooke	Française des Jeux
2003	Australia	Robbie McEwen	Lotto–Domo
2004	Belgium	Ludovic Capelle	Landbouwkrediet–Colnago
2005	Belgium	Niko Eeckhout	Chocolade Jacques–T Interim
2006	Belgium	Frederik Veuchelen	Chocolade Jacques–Topsport Vlaanderen
2007	Belgium	Tom Boonen	Quick-Step–Innergetic
2008	France	Sylvain Chavanel	Cofidis
2009	Belgium	Kevin Van Impe	Quick-Step
2010	Denmark	Matti Breschel	Team Saxo Bank
2011	Belgium	Nick Nuyens	Saxo Bank–SunGard
2012	Netherlands	Niki Terpstra	Omega Pharma–Quick-Step
2013	Italy	Oscar Gatto	Vini Fantini–Selle Italia
2014	Netherlands	Niki Terpstra	Omega Pharma–Quick-Step
2015	Belgium	Jelle Wallays	Topsport Vlaanderen–Baloise
2016	Belgium	Jens Debusschere	Lotto–Soudal
2017	Belgium	Yves Lampaert	Quick-Step Floors
2018	Belgium	Yves Lampaert	Quick-Step Floors
2019	Netherlands	Mathieu van der Poel	Corendon–Circus
2020	**No race** due to COVID-19 pandemic		
2021	Netherlands	Dylan van Baarle	INEOS Grenadiers
2022	Netherlands	Mathieu van der Poel	Alpecin–Fenix
2023	France	Christophe Laporte	Team Jumbo–Visma
2024	United States	Matteo Jorgenson	Visma–Lease a Bike
2025	United States	Neilson Powless	EF Education–EasyPost
2026	Italy	Filippo Ganna	INEOS Grenadiers

Source: www.dwarsdoorvlaanderen.be

=== Multiple winners ===
Riders in bold are active

Wins	Rider	Editions
2	André Rosseel (BEL)	1948, 1950
2	Raymond Impanis (BEL)	1949, 1951
2	Briek Schotte (BEL)	1953, 1955
2	Walter Godefroot (BEL)	1966, 1968
2	Daniel Van Ryckeghem (BEL)	1967, 1970
2	Walter Planckaert (BEL)	1977, 1984
2	Eric Vanderaerden (BEL)	1986, 1991
2	Jelle Nijdam (NED)	1987, 1995
2	Johan Museeuw (BEL)	1993, 1999
2	Tristan Hoffman (NED)	1996, 2000
2	Niko Eeckhout (BEL)	2001, 2005
2	Niki Terpstra (NED)	2012, 2014
2	**Yves Lampaert (BEL)**	2017, 2018
2	**Mathieu van der Poel (NED)**	2019, 2022

=== Wins per country ===
Wins	Country
54	Belgium
15	Netherlands
2	Australia; France; Italy; United States
1	Denmark; Germany; Ukraine

== Women's race winners ==
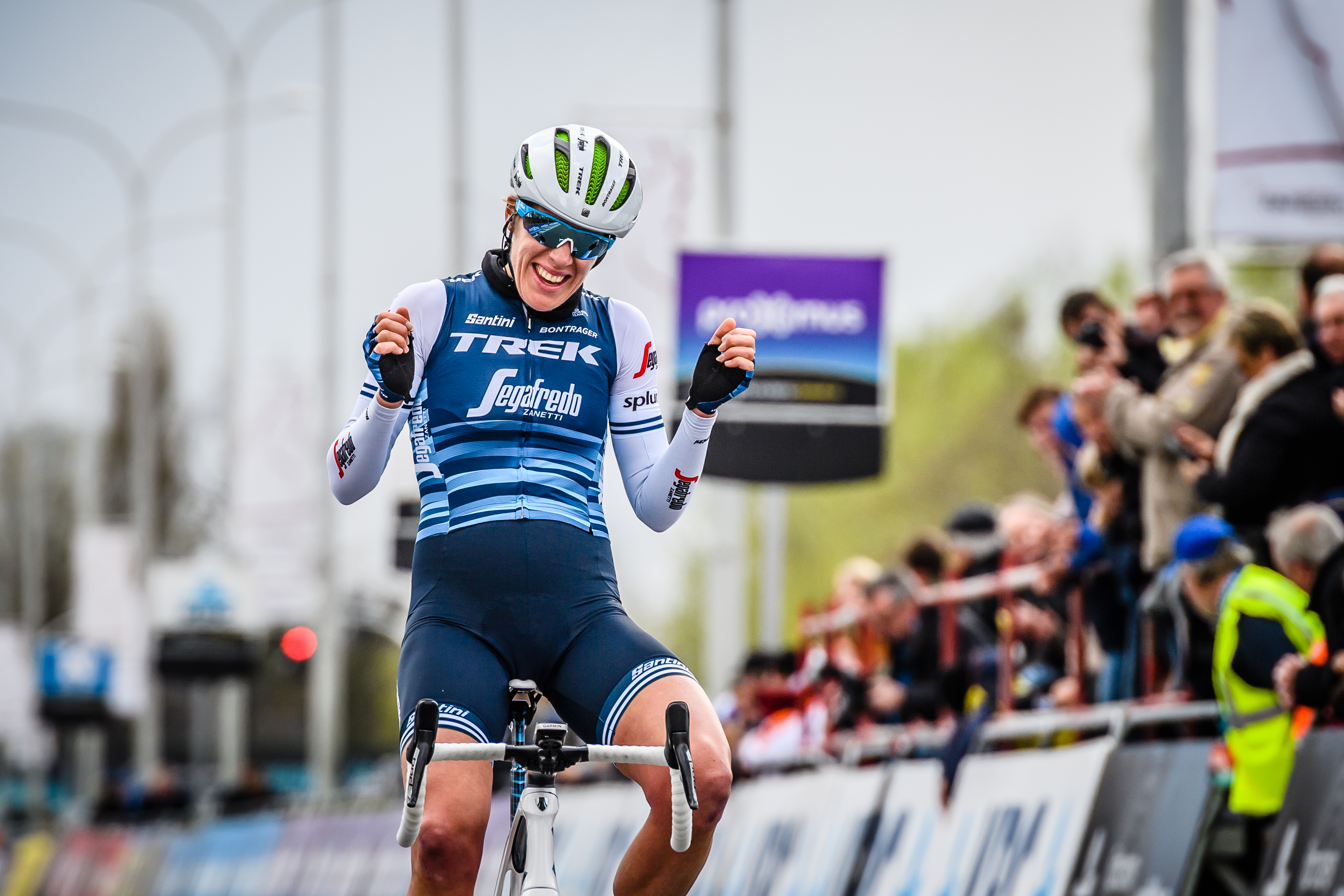
Ellen Van Dijk (Trek–Segafredo) winning the 2019 women's race

Year	Country	Rider	Team
2012	Netherlands	Monique van de Ree	Skil 1t4i
2013	Netherlands	Kirsten Wild	Argos–Shimano
2014	Netherlands	Amy Pieters	Giant–Shimano
2015	Netherlands	Amy Pieters	Team Liv–Plantur
2016	Netherlands	Amy Pieters	Wiggle High5
2017	Finland	Lotta Lepistö	Cervélo–Bigla Pro Cycling
2018	Netherlands	Ellen van Dijk	Team Sunweb
2019	Netherlands	Ellen van Dijk	Trek–Segafredo
2020	No race due to COVID-19 pandemic		
2021	Netherlands	Annemiek van Vleuten	Movistar Team
2022	Italy	Chiara Consonni	Valcar–Travel & Service
2023	Netherlands	Demi Vollering	SD Worx
2024	Netherlands	Marianne Vos	Visma–Lease a Bike
2025	Italy	Elisa Longo Borghini	UAE Team ADQ
2026	Switzerland	Marlen Reusser	Movistar Team

=== Multiple winners ===
Riders in italics are active

Wins	Rider	Editions
3	Amy Pieters (NED)	2014, 2015, 2016
2	Ellen van Dijk (NED)	2018, 2019

=== Wins per country ===
Wins	Country
10	Netherlands
2	Italy
1	Finland; Switzerland
