= 1956 Dwars door België =

Race details
- Dates: 13–14 April 1956
- Stages: 2
- Distance: 471 km (292.7 mi)
- Winning time: 11h 22' 45"

Results
	Winner	Lucien Demunster (BEL)
	Second	Frans Schoubben (BEL)
	Third	André Rosseel (BEL)

The 1956 Dwars door België was the 12th edition of the Dwars door Vlaanderen cycle race and was held on 13 to 14 April 1956. The race started and finished in Waregem. The race was won by Lucien Demunster.

== General classification ==
Final general classification

Rank	Rider	Time
1	Lucien Demunster (BEL)	11h 22' 45"
2	Frans Schoubben (BEL)	+ 6"
3	André Rosseel (BEL)	+ 17"
4	Gilbert Desmet (BEL)	+ 23"
5	Jef Planckaert (BEL)	+ 27"
6	Andre Blomme (BEL)	+ 29"
7	Roger Rosselle (BEL)	+ 29"
8	Lucien Mathys (BEL)	+ 29"
9	Ernest Sterckx (BEL)	+ 34"
10	Alfons Van den Brande (BEL)	+ 34"
