= Louis Verreydt =

Belgian cyclist

- Verreydt in 1974

Personal information
- Born: 25 November 1950 Antwerp, Belgium
- Died: 13 August 1977 (aged 26)

Cycling career
- Sport: Cycling

Professional teams
- 1972: Goldor-IJsboerke
- 1973: IJsboerke-Bertin
- 1974–1975: IJsboerke-Colner

Major wins
- One-day races and Classics Le Samyn (1973) Dwars door België (1974)

Louis Verreydt (25 November 1950 – 13 August 1977) was a Belgian cyclist. He competed in the team time trial at the 1972 Summer Olympics. He died of a heart attack in 1977.

== Major results ==
1971
1st Paris–Roubaix Espoirs
1st Rund um Sebnitz
1st Stage 10 Tour d'Algérie Espoirs
1st Coupe Marcel Indekeu
2nd Flèche Ardennaise Amateurs
2nd Tour of Belgium Amateurs

1st Stage 7

3rd Ronde van Vlaanderen U23
1972
1st Heistse Pijl
2nd Belgian National Road Race Championships Amateurs
2nd Paris–Roubaix Espoirs
2nd Flèche Ardennaise Amateurs
3rd Overall Tour du Nord
3rd Omloop der Vlaamse Gewesten Amateurs
5th Overall Grand Prix Guillaume Tell

1st Stage 4

1973
1st Le Samyn
2nd Scheldeprijs
3rd Kortrijk–Galmaarden
4th Grote Prijs Jef Scherens
5th Grand Prix des Nations
1974
1st Dwars door België
1975
3rd Omloop Scheldeboorden
3rd Flèche Halloise
3rd GP Betekom
4th Omloop van de Grensstreek (Ledegem)
