= 1945 Dwars door België =

Race details
- Dates: 30–31 August 1945
- Stages: 2
- Distance: 338 km (210 mi)
- Winning time: 9h 17' 00"

Results
	Winner	Rik Van Steenbergen (BEL)
	Second	Brik Schotte (BEL)
	Third	Norbert Callens (BEL)

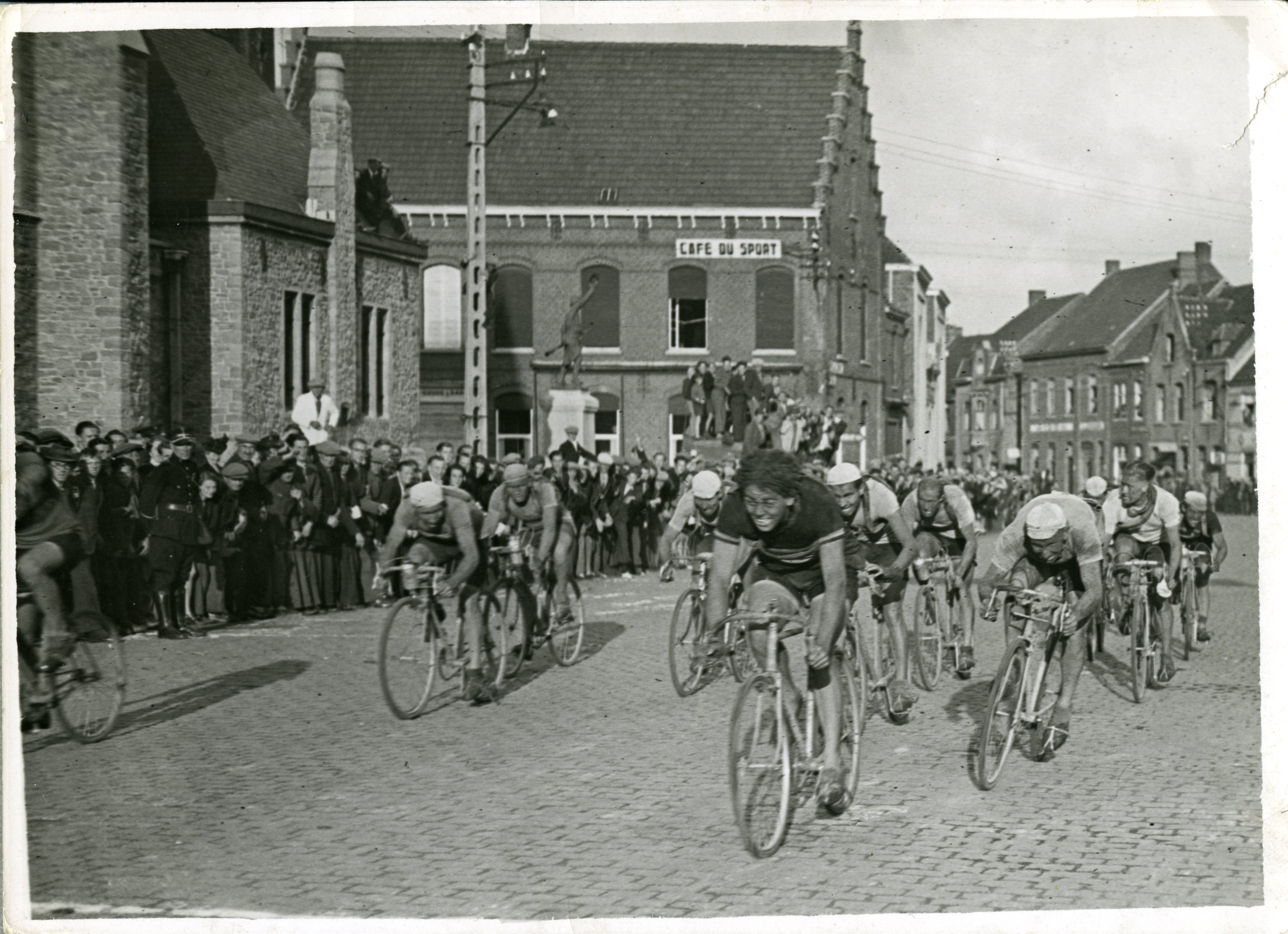

The 1945 Dwars door België was the inaugural edition of the Dwars door Vlaanderen cycle race and was held on 30 and 31 August 1945. The first section of the race began in Brussels and ended in Sint-Truiden; while the second section began in Sint-Truiden and ended in Waregem. The race was won by Rik Van Steenbergen.

== General classification ==
Final general classification

Rank	Rider	Time
1	Rik Van Steenbergen (BEL)	9h 17' 00"
2	Briek Schotte (BEL)	+ 54"
3	Norbert Callens (BEL)	
4	Edward Peeters (BEL)	
5	Gustaaf Bonvarle (BEL)	
6	Marcel Boumon (BEL)	
7	Emiel Rogiers (BEL)	
8	Karel Terryn (BEL)	
9	Michel Remue (BEL)	
9	Maurice Van der Elst (BEL)	
9	Jos Moerenhout (BEL)	
