= 1967 Dwars door België =

Race details
- Dates: 26 March 1967
- Stages: 1
- Distance: 206 km (128.0 mi)
- Winning time: 5h 26' 00"

Results
| | Winner | Daniel Van Ryckeghem (BEL) |
| | Second | Georges Vandenberghe (BEL) |
| | Third | Jozef Spruyt (BEL) |

The 1967 Dwars door België was the 23rd edition of the Dwars door Vlaanderen cycle race and was held on 26 March 1967. The race started and finished in Waregem. The race was won by Daniel Van Ryckeghem.

== General classification ==
Final general classification

| Rank | Rider | Time |
|---|---|---|
| 1 | Daniel Van Ryckeghem (BEL) | 5h 26' 00" |
| 2 | Georges Vandenberghe (BEL) | + 0" |
| 3 | Jozef Spruyt (BEL) | + 0" |
| 4 | Bernard Van de Kerckhove (BEL) | + 0" |
| 5 | Gustaaf De Smet (BEL) | + 55" |
| 6 | Walter Godefroot (BEL) | + 55" |
| 7 | Barry Hoban (GBR) | + 1' 05" |
| 8 | Noël Van Clooster (BEL) | + 1' 08" |
| 9 | Ludo Vandromme (BEL) | + 1' 10" |
| 10 | Arthur Decabooter (BEL) | + 1' 15" |
