= Flemish Cycling Week =

Annual road cycling competition in Flanders

The Flemish Cycling Week (Dutch:Vlaamse Wielerweek) or simply Flemish Week, is a series of five road cycling races held in Flanders in late March and early April. The series in fact spans two weeks. It has begun with Tour of Bruges since 2018 and ends 11–12 days later with the Tour of Flanders, which is the most important race of the series. Tour of Flanders is the oldest of the five races, first held in 1913. Tour of Bruges (formerly Three Days of De Panne and Classic Brugge–De Panne) is the youngest event, first held in 1977.

Since 2004, the races have begun to hold women's editions on the same day – as of 2026, four of the five races hold women's races, all part of the UCI Women's World Tour.

== Events ==
Since 2018, the series has consisted of five one-day races for men:

- Tour of Bruges, on Wednesday of the week before the Tour of Flanders. Known as Three Days of De Panne until 2017 and held as stage race from Tuesday to Thursday in the same week as the Tour of Flanders. From 2018, it was held as a one-day race called Classic Brugge–De Panne.
- E3 Saxo Bank Classic, on Friday or Saturday of the week before the Tour of Flanders. Previously known by other names, including E3 Harelbeke.
- Gent–Wevelgem, on Sunday before the Tour of Flanders
- Dwars door Vlaanderen, until 2017 held on Wednesday of the week before the Tour of Flanders, since 2018 in the same week
- Tour of Flanders, the final race of the series. First held in 1913, it is most prestigious of the five races, as one of the cycling monuments.

Originally the Brabantse Pijl was part of the Flemish Cycling Week as it was run the Sunday before the Tour of Flanders, but in 2010 it was rescheduled to a later date, because the race course was more suitable for riders participating in the Ardennes classics. The gap in the calendar was filled by Gent-Wevelgem, which used to be held on the Wednesday after the Tour of Flanders.

== Winners (since 1990) ==
=== From 1990 till 2009 ===
Edition	Dwars door Vlaanderen	E3 Harelbeke	Brabantse Pijl	Three Days of De Panne	Gent–Wevelgem	Tour of Flanders
1990	Edwig Van Hooydonck (BEL)	Søren Lilholt (DEN)	Frans Maassen (NED)	Erwin Nijboer (NED)	Herman Frison (BEL)	Moreno Argentin (ITA)
1991	Eric Vanderaerden (BEL)	Olaf Ludwig (GER)	Edwig Van Hooydonck (BEL)	Jelle Nijdam (NED)	Djamolidine Abdoujaparov (URS)	Edwig Van Hooydonck (BEL)
1992	Olaf Ludwig (GER)	Johan Museeuw (BEL)	Johan Capiot (BEL)	Frans Maassen (NED)	Mario Cipollini (ITA)	Jacky Durand (FRA)
1993	Johan Museeuw (BEL)	Mario Cipollini (ITA)	Edwig Van Hooydonck (BEL)	Eric Vanderaerden (BEL)	Mario Cipollini (ITA)	Johan Museeuw (BEL)
1994	Carlo Bomans (BEL)	Andrei Tchmil (MDA)	Michele Bartoli (ITA)	Fabio Roscioli (ITA)	Wilfried Peeters (BEL)	Gianni Bugno (ITA)
1995	Jelle Nijdam (NED)	Bart Leysen (BEL)	Edwig Van Hooydonck (BEL)	Michele Bartoli (ITA)	Lars Michaelsen (DEN)	Johan Museeuw (BEL)
1996	Tristan Hoffman (NED)	Carlo Bomans (BEL)	Johan Museeuw (BEL)	Viatcheslav Ekimov (RUS)	Tom Steels (BEL)	Michele Bartoli (ITA)
1997	Andrei Tchmil (UKR)	Hendrik Van Dijck (BEL)	Gianluca Pianegonda (ITA)	Johan Museeuw (BEL)	Philippe Gaumont (FRA)	Rolf Sørensen (DEN)
1998	Tom Steels (BEL)	Johan Museeuw (BEL)	Johan Museeuw (BEL)	Michele Bartoli (ITA)	Frank Vandenbroucke (BEL)	Johan Museeuw (BEL)
1999	Johan Museeuw (BEL)	Peter Van Petegem (BEL)	Michele Bartoli (ITA)	Peter Van Petegem (BEL)	Tom Steels (BEL)	Peter Van Petegem (BEL)
2000	Tristan Hoffman (NED)	Serguei Ivanov (RUS)	Johan Museeuw (BEL)	Viatcheslav Ekimov (RUS)	Geert Van Bondt (BEL)	Andrei Tchmil (BEL)
2001	Nico Eeckhout (BEL)	Andrei Tchmil (BEL)	Michael Boogerd (NED)	Nico Mattan (BEL)	George Hincapie (USA)	Gianluca Bortolami (ITA)
2002	Baden Cooke (AUS)	Dario Pieri (ITA)	Fabien De Waele (BEL)	Peter Van Petegem (BEL)	Mario Cipollini (ITA)	Andrea Tafi (ITA)
2003	Robbie McEwen (AUS)	Steven de Jongh (NED)	Michael Boogerd (NED)	Raivis Belohvoščiks (LAT)	Andreas Klier (GER)	Peter Van Petegem (BEL)
2004	Ludovic Capelle (BEL)	Tom Boonen (BEL)	Luca Paolini (ITA)	George Hincapie (USA)	Tom Boonen (BEL)	Steffen Wesemann (GER)
2005	Nico Eeckhout (BEL)	Tom Boonen (BEL)	Óscar Freire (ESP)	Stijn Devolder (BEL)	Nico Mattan (BEL)	Tom Boonen (BEL)
2006	Frederik Veuchelen (BEL)	Tom Boonen (BEL)	Óscar Freire (ESP)	Leif Hoste (BEL)	Thor Hushovd (NOR)	Tom Boonen (BEL)
2007	Tom Boonen (BEL)	Tom Boonen (BEL)	Óscar Freire (ESP)	Alessandro Ballan (ITA)	Marcus Burghardt (GER)	Alessandro Ballan (ITA)
2008	Sylvain Chavanel (FRA)	Kurt Asle Arvesen (NOR)	Sylvain Chavanel (FRA)	Joost Posthuma (NED)	Óscar Freire (ESP)	Stijn Devolder (BEL)
2009	Kevin Van Impe (BEL)	Filippo Pozzato (ITA)	Anthony Geslin (FRA)	Frederik Willems (BEL)	Edvald Boasson Hagen (NOR)	Stijn Devolder (BEL)
	Dwars door Vlaanderen	E3 Harelbeke	Brabantse Pijl	Three Days of De Panne	Gent–Wevelgem	Tour of Flanders

=== From 2010 till 2017 ===
Edition	Dwars door Vlaanderen	E3 Harelbeke	Gent–Wevelgem	Three Days of De Panne	Tour of Flanders
2010	Matti Breschel (DEN)	Fabian Cancellara (SUI)	Bernhard Eisel (AUT)	David Millar (GBR)	Fabian Cancellara (SUI)
2011	Nick Nuyens (BEL)	Fabian Cancellara (SUI)	Tom Boonen (BEL)	Sébastien Rosseler (BEL)	Nick Nuyens (BEL)
2012	Niki Terpstra (NED)	Tom Boonen (BEL)	Tom Boonen (BEL)	Sylvain Chavanel (FRA)	Tom Boonen (BEL)
2013	Oscar Gatto (ITA)	Fabian Cancellara (SUI)	Peter Sagan (SVK)	Sylvain Chavanel (FRA)	Fabian Cancellara (SUI)
2014	Niki Terpstra (NED)	Peter Sagan (SVK)	John Degenkolb (GER)	Guillaume Van Keirsbulck (BEL)	Fabian Cancellara (SUI)
2015	Jelle Wallays (BEL)	Geraint Thomas (GBR)	Luca Paolini (ITA)	Alexander Kristoff (NOR)	Alexander Kristoff (NOR)
2016	Jens Debusschere (BEL)	Michał Kwiatkowski (POL)	Peter Sagan (SVK)	Lieuwe Westra (NED)	Peter Sagan (SVK)
2017	Yves Lampaert (BEL)	Greg Van Avermaet (BEL)	Greg Van Avermaet (BEL)	Philippe Gilbert (BEL)	Philippe Gilbert (BEL)
	Dwars door Vlaanderen	E3 Harelbeke	Gent–Wevelgem	Three Days of De Panne	Tour of Flanders

=== From 2018 ===
In 2018, multi-stage race Three Days of De Panne was rebranded as one-day race Classic Brugge–De Panne and moved to mid-March. From 2026, it rebranded as Tour of Bruges.

Edition	Classic Brugge–De Panne	E3 Harelbeke	Gent–Wevelgem	Dwars door Vlaanderen	Tour of Flanders
2018	Elia Viviani (ITA)	Niki Terpstra (NED)	Peter Sagan (SVK)	Yves Lampaert (BEL)	Niki Terpstra (NED)
2019	Dylan Groenewegen (NED)	Zdenek Stybar (CZE)	Alexander Kristoff (NOR)	Mathieu van der Poel (NED)	Alberto Bettiol (ITA)
2020	Yves Lampaert (BEL)	Not held – SARS-CoV2	Mads Pedersen (DEN)	Not held – SARS-CoV2	Mathieu van der Poel (NED)
2021	Sam Bennett (IRL)	Kasper Asgreen (DEN)	Wout van Aert (BEL)	Dylan van Baarle (NED)	Kasper Asgreen (DEN)
2022	Tim Merlier (BEL)	Wout van Aert (BEL)	Biniam Girmay (ERI)	Mathieu van der Poel (NED)	Mathieu van der Poel (NED)
2023	Jasper Philipsen (BEL)	Wout van Aert (BEL)	Christophe Laporte (FRA)	Christophe Laporte (FRA)	Tadej Pogačar (SLO)
2024	Jasper Philipsen (BEL)	Mathieu van der Poel (NED)	Mads Pedersen (DEN)	Matteo Jorgenson (USA)	Mathieu van der Poel (NED)
2025	Juan Sebastián Molano (COL)	Mathieu van der Poel (NED)	Mads Pedersen (DEN)	Neilson Powless (USA)	Tadej Pogačar (SLO)
2026	Dylan Groenewegen (NED)	Mathieu van der Poel (NED)	Jasper Philipsen (BEL)	Filippo Ganna (ITA)	Tadej Pogačar (SLO)
	Tour of Bruges	E3 Harelbeke	In Flanders Fields	Dwars door Vlaanderen	Tour of Flanders

== Women's races ==
Since 2004, the races have begun to hold women's editions on the same day – as of 2026, four of the five races hold women's races, all held as part of the UCI Women's World Tour.

- Tour of Bruges, held on Wednesday of the week before the Tour of Flanders. A women's race was first held in 2018 under the Classic Brugge–De Panne name, and has been part of the UCI Women's World Tour since 2018.
- Gent–Wevelgem, on Sunday before the Tour of Flanders. A women's race was first held in 2012, and has been part of the UCI Women's World Tour since its inception in 2016.
- Dwars door Vlaanderen, held on Wednesday of the Tour of Flanders. A women's race was first held in 2012, and has been part of the UCI Women's World Tour since 2026.
- Tour of Flanders, the oldest of the four races, hosting a women's race from 2004. It has been part of the UCI Women's World Tour since its inception in 2016.

A women's edition of E3 Saxo Bank Classic was held between 2022 and 2023 under the name Leiedal Koerse, but the 2024 edition was cancelled due to financial issues.
