= 1974 Dwars door België =

Race details
- Dates: 24 March 1974
- Stages: 1
- Distance: 199 km (123.7 mi)
- Winning time: 4h 56' 00"

Results
	Winner	Louis Verreydt (BEL)
	Second	Ronald De Witte (BEL)
	Third	René Pijnen (NED)

The 1974 Dwars door België was the 29th edition of the Dwars door Vlaanderen cycle race and was held on 24 March 1974. The race started and finished in Waregem. The race was won by Louis Verreydt.

== General classification ==
Final general classification

Rank	Rider	Time
1	Louis Verreydt (BEL)	4h 56' 00"
2	Ronald De Witte (BEL)	+ 0"
3	René Pijnen (NED)	+ 0"
4	Dirk Baert (BEL)	+ 20"
5	Walter Planckaert (BEL)	+ 20"
6	Marc Demeyer (BEL)	+ 20"
7	Julien Stevens (BEL)	+ 20"
8	Frans Van Looy (BEL)	+ 20"
9	Wim de Waal (NED)	+ 20"
10	Walter Godefroot (BEL)	+ 20"
