= 1975 Scheldeprijs =

Race details
- Dates: 29 July 1975
- Stages: 1
- Distance: 246 km (152.9 mi)
- Winning time: 5h 44' 30"

Results
	Winner	Ronald De Witte (BEL)
	Second	Dietrich Thurau (FRG)
	Third	Freddy Maertens (BEL)

The 1975 Scheldeprijs was the 62nd edition of the Scheldeprijs cycle race and was held on 29 July 1975. The race was won by Ronald De Witte.

== General classification ==
Final general classification

Rank	Rider	Time
1	Ronald De Witte (BEL)	5h 44' 30"
2	Dietrich Thurau (FRG)	+ 0"
3	Freddy Maertens (BEL)	+ 11"
4	Roger De Vlaeminck (BEL)	+ 11"
5	Frans Verbeeck (BEL)	+ 11"
6	Marc Demeyer (BEL)	+ 11"
7	Jozef Abelshausen (BEL)	+ 11"
8	Frans Van Looy (BEL)	+ 11"
9	Eric Van De Wiele (BEL)	+ 11"
10	José De Cauwer (BEL)	+ 11"
