= Gustaaf Van Roosbroeck =

Belgian cyclist

Personal information
- Born: 16 May 1948 (age 78) Hulshout, Belgium

Cycling career
- Sport: Cycling
- Current team: Retired
- Discipline: Road
- Role: Rider

Professional teams
- 1969–1970: Mercier–BP–Hutchinson
- 1971–1972: Watney–Avia
- 1973: Rokado–De Gribaldy
- 1974–1975: MIC–Ludo–de Gribaldy
- 1976: Maes Pils–Rokado
- 1977–1980: IJsboerke–Colnago
- 1981: Vermeer Thijs

Major wins
- Grand Tours Giro d'Italia 1 individual stage (1973) Stage races Three Days of De Panne (1979) One-day races and Classics Scheldeprijs (1971) Dwars door België (1979) Nokere Koerse (1978) Kuurne–Brussels–Kuurne (1972) Grand Prix de Denain (1972)

Gustaf Van Roosbroeck (born 16 May 1948 in Hulshout) is a retired Belgian professional road bicycle racer who competed in the 1970s.

He finished fifth in the 1974 Amstel Gold Race.

== Major results ==
1969
1st Stages 2 & 3 Olympia's Tour
1971
1st Scheldeprijs
1st Stage 5 Tour of Belgium
1972
1st Kuurne–Brussels–Kuurne
1st Grand Prix de Denain
1st Nationale Sluitingsprijs
1st Omloop van de Fruitstreek
1st Stage 2 Grand Prix de Fourmies
6th Paris–Roubaix
1973
1st Nationale Sluitingsprijs
1st Trofeo Luis Puig
1st Stage 3 Giro d'Italia
1st Stage 7 Tour de Suisse
1st Prologue (TTT) Tour of Belgium
1974
1st Flèche Hesbignonne
1st Stage 5 Tour de Romandie
2nd Züri-Metzgete
3rd Le Samyn
1975
7th Tour of Flanders
1978
1st Nokere Koerse
1st Gullegem Koerse
2nd Grote Prijs Jef Scherens
3rd Züri-Metzgete
3rd Grand Prix de Denain
1979
1st Overall Three Days of De Panne
1st Dwars door België
2nd Circuit de Wallonie
1980
2nd Overall Three Days of De Panne

1st Stage 1
