= Tristan Hoffman =

Dutch cyclist (born 1970)

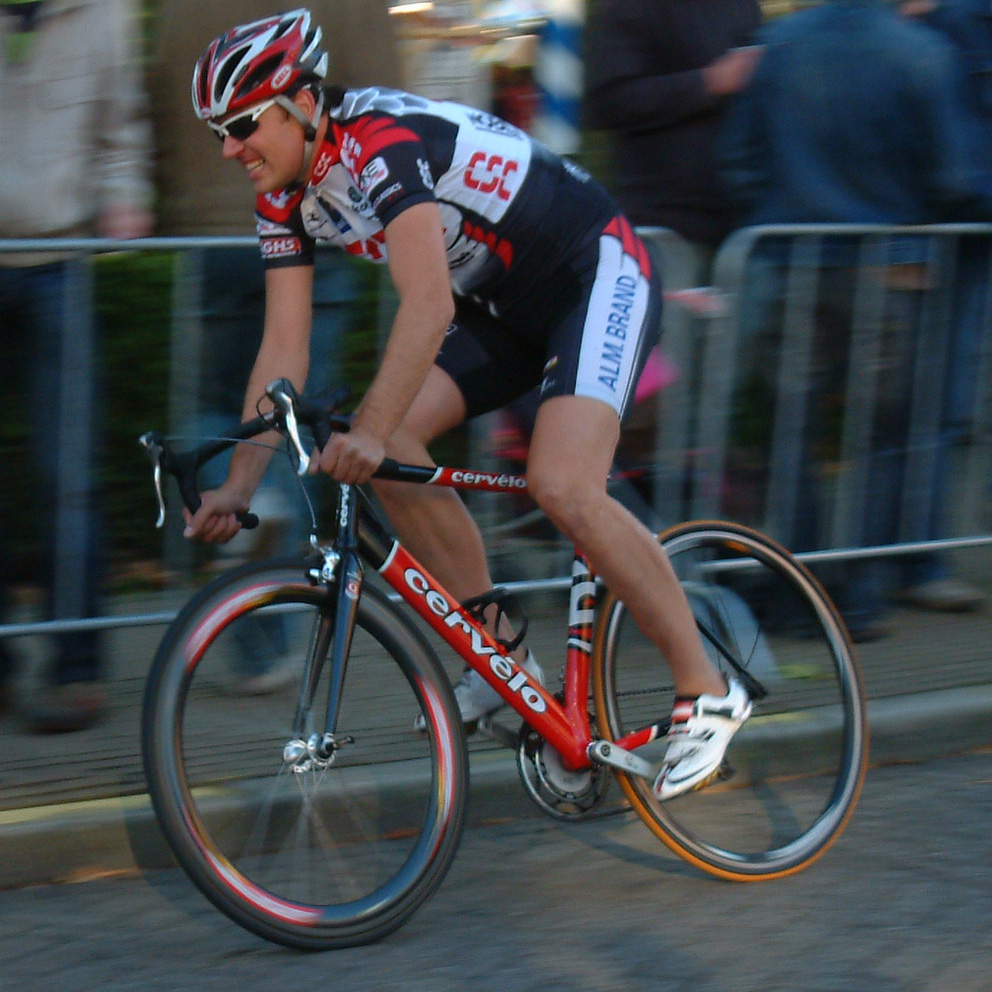

Personal information
- Full name: Tristan Henri Christiaan Hoffman
- Born: 1 January 1970 (age 56) Groenlo, Netherlands

Cycling career
- Sport: Cycling
- Current team: HTC–Highroad
- Discipline: Road
- Role: Directeur Sportif
- Rider type: Classics specialist

Professional teams
- 1992–1999: TVM
- 2000: Memory Card-Jack & Jones
- 2001–2005: Team CSC

Managerial teams
- 2005–2006: Team CSC
- 2007–2010: Team High Road
- 2014-2017: Tinkoff-Saxo
- 2017: Bahrain-Merida

Major wins
- National Road Race Championships (1992); Veenendaal–Veenendaal (1999); Dwars door Vlaanderen (1996, 2000)

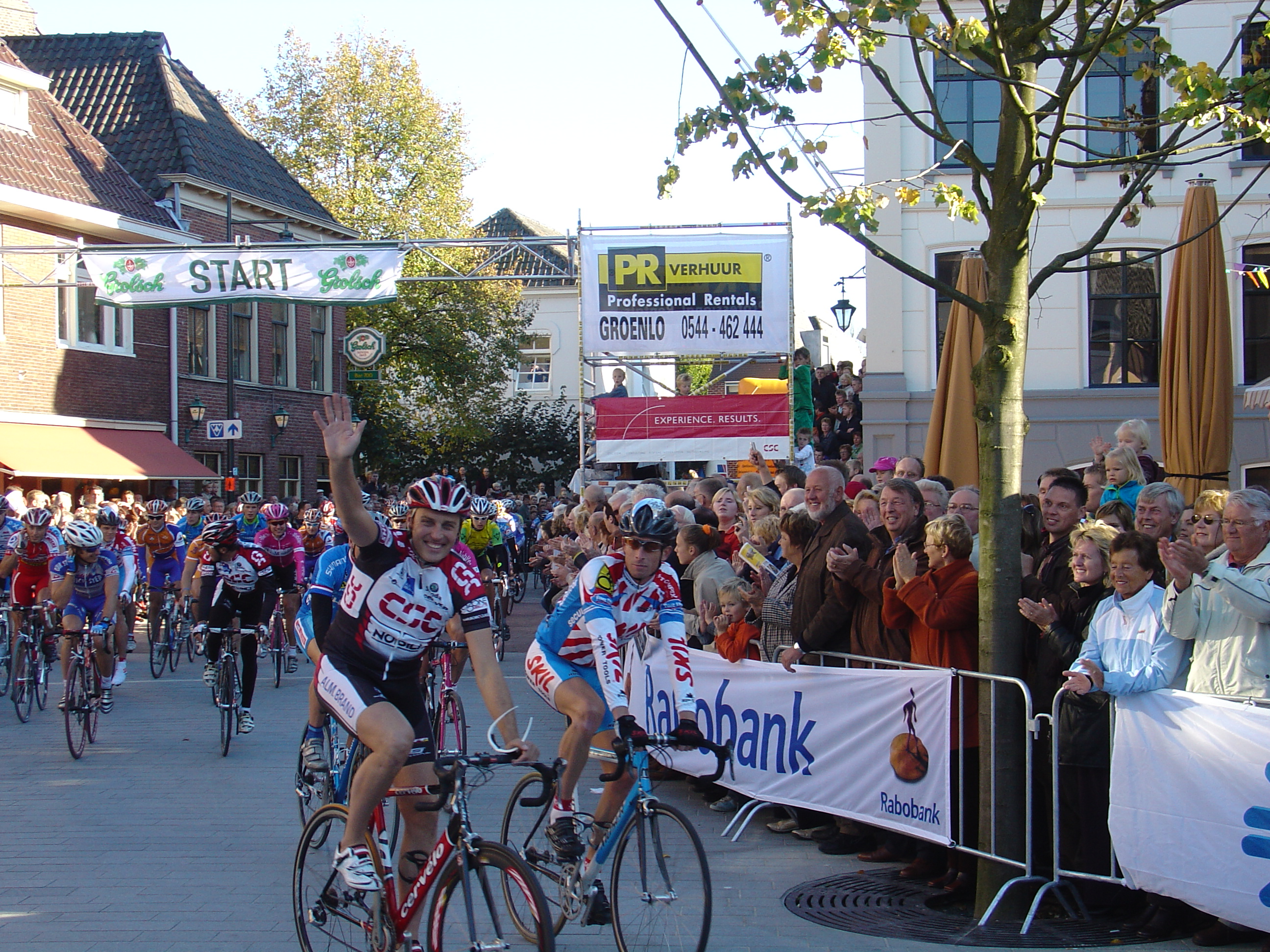
Hoffman accompanied by colleagues at his goodbye race in Groenlo, Netherlands.

Tristan Henri Christiaan Hoffman (born 1 January 1970 in Groenlo, Oost Gelre) is a Dutch former road racing cyclist. After his racing years he became a directeur sportif for Team CSC, and later for HTC–Highroad. He also competed in the men's individual road race at the 1996 Summer Olympics.

== Palmarès ==
1991
1st, Overall, Ster Elektrotoer
1992
1st, National Road Race Championships
1993
1st, Stage 1, Tour de l'Avenir
1st, Stage 3, Tour de Suisse
1994
1st, Stage 1, Herald Sun Tour
1995
1st, Stages 2 & 4, Tour of Sweden
1st, Stage, Vuelta a Murcia
1996
1st, Dwars door Vlaanderen
1st, Paris–Bourges
4th, Paris–Tours
1998
2nd, National Road Race Championships
1999
1st, Veenendaal–Veenendaal
1st, Clásica de Sabiñánigo
1st, Stage 1, Driedaagse van West-Vlaanderen
3rd, Gent–Wevelgem
2000
1st, Dwars door Vlaanderen
1st, Ronde van Made
4th, Paris–Roubaix
4th, Gent–Wevelgem
5th, Tour of Flanders
2001
5th, E3 Harelbeke
2002
4th, Paris–Roubaix
9th, Gent–Wevelgem
2004
2nd, Paris–Roubaix

== See also ==
- List of Dutch Olympic cyclists
