= Gottem =

Village in Belgium

Coordinates: 50°57′54″N 3°27′41″E

Location of Gottem

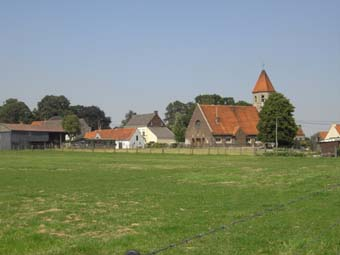
Gottem (2007)

Gottem is a village in the Belgian province of East Flanders and is a submunicipality of Deinze. It was an independent municipality until the municipal reorganization of 1977. The village is located on the Lys river, a few kilometers upstream from Deinze. The village had 632 inhabitants in 1981.

In the 9th century, Gottem was mentioned in the Liber Traditionem (814-840) of the Saint Peter's Abbey in Ghent as Gothemia, derived from the Germanic Gauta haim (home of Gautians). Roman finds on the territory indicate a very old habitation of the village. Until the 16th century, the village lordship was dependent on the lords of Nevele. In 1558, it was given in fief by F. de Montmorency to the Ghent alderman L. van Sicleers. After 1615 F. Lanchals was lord of Gottem, afterwards the de Kerchove family. Three lordships remained dependent on the Land of Nevele: ter Walle, ter Leien and Meulenwalle, together called the "Heerschip van Gottem".

By straightening the Lys river in 1972, the eastern edge of the Lys was cut off from the municipality. Protests, including by painter Roger Raveel, prevented the filling in of the old Lye bend.
