= Gustaaf De Smet =

Belgian cyclist (1935–2020)

- De Smet after winning the 1964 Championship of Flanders

Personal information
- Born: 15 May 1935 Mariakerke, Belgium
- Died: 28 May 2020 (aged 85) Oostakker, Belgium

Cycling career
- Sport: Cycling
- Discipline: Road
- Role: Rider

Professional team
- 1960–1968: Groene Leeuw–Sinalco–SAS

Major wins
- Other stage races Four Days of Dunkirk (1965) One-day races and Classics Schaal Sels (1960) Nationale Sluitingprijs (1962, 1964) Kampioenschap van Vlaanderen (1964) Kuurne–Brussels–Kuurne (1966)

Gustaaf De Smet (15 May 1935 – 28 May 2020) was a Belgian cyclist. He competed in three events at the 1956 Summer Olympics. He spent his entire professional career riding for Groene Leeuw–Sinalco–SAS. He became East-Flemish champion in 1964.

De Smet died on 28 May 2020, aged 85.

== Major results ==
1956
1st Ronde van Vlaanderen Beloften
1957
2nd Schaal Sels
1960
1st Schaal Sels
1961
3rd Omloop van Limburg
3rd Kampioenschap van Vlaanderen
8th Scheldeprijs
8th Paris–Tours
1962
1st GP Victor Standaert
1st Nationale Sluitingprijs
5th Overall Tour du Nord
6th Kampioenschap van Vlaanderen
7th Scheldeprijs
1963
1st GP de Denain
1st Dwars door West-Vlaanderen
2nd Nationale Sluitingprijs
3rd Brabantse Pijl
4th Kampioenschap van Vlaanderen
1964
1st Kampioenschap van Vlaanderen
1st Nationale Sluitingprijs
1st Omloop der Vlaamse Gewesten
2nd De Kustpijl
3rd Paris–Tours
4th Dwars door België
6th Kuurne–Brussels–Kuurne
8th Tour of Flanders
1965
1st Overall Four Days of Dunkirk

1st Stages 1, 2 & 5

2nd Paris–Tours
2nd Schaal Sels
2nd Circuit des Onze Villes
3rd Gent–Wevelgem
3rd Kampioenschap van Vlaanderen
3rd Nokere Koerse
5th Paris–Brussels
8th Tour of Flanders
9th Kuurne–Brussels–Kuurne
1966
1st Kuurne–Brussels–Kuurne
2nd Nationale Sluitingprijs
3rd Kampioenschap van Vlaanderen
3rd Paris–Roubaix
5th Paris–Brussels
5th Paris–Tours
1967
1st GP Flandria
3rd Kampioenschap van Vlaanderen
3rd GP Stad Zottegem
5th Dwars door België
8th Kuurne–Brussels–Kuurne
1968
1st Circuit du Houtland-Torhout
6th Circuit des Onze Villes
7th Dwars door België
