= Clément Roman =

Belgian cyclist

Personal information
- Born: 22 February 1938 (age 88)

Cycling career
- Sport: Cycling
- Role: Rider

Clément Roman (born 22 February 1938) is a Belgian racing cyclist. He rode in the 1963 Tour de France.
