= List of teams and cyclists in the 1973 Tour de France =

List of cyclists

For the 1973 Tour de France, the winner of the previous four editions, Eddy Merckx had changed sponsors to the Italian Molteni. His contract said that he had to start in the 1973 Vuelta a España and the 1973 Giro d'Italia, and Merckx thought it was impossible to start in three grand tours in one year, so he stayed away from the Tour. Ocana, who was in great shape, was now the main favourite, with Fuente, Poulidor and Thevenet as his biggest threats. However, Ocana was not the clear favorite; he had already crashed out of the Tour three times, and he was seen as fragile. Zoetemelk had changed teams, because he did not have the full support of his team leader.

The Italian teams did not join the 1973 Tour de France, because no top French cyclist joined the 1973 Giro d'Italia. This meant that world champion Marino Basso and former Tour winner Felice Gimondi were absent. The Tour started with the following 12 teams, each with 11 cyclists:

- Gan–Mercier
- Sonolor
- Carpenter–Shimano–Flandria
- Peugeot–BP
- Bic
- Watney–Maes
- Rokado
- Gitane–Frigécrème
- Canada Dry–Gazelle
- De Kova–Lejeune
- Kas
- La Casera–Bahamontes

== Start list ==
=== By team ===
Gan–Mercier
No.	Rider	Pos.
1	Raymond Poulidor (FRA)	DNF
2	Régis Delépine (FRA)	82
3	Jean-Pierre Genet (FRA)	46
4	René Grelin (FRA)	26
5	Charly Grosskost (FRA)	67
6	Cyrille Guimard (FRA)	DNF
7	Barry Hoban (GBR)	43
8	Mariano Martínez (FRA)	12
9	Gérard Moneyron (FRA)	79
10	Jack Mourioux (FRA)	76
11	Michel Périn (FRA)	7

Sonolor
No.	Rider	Pos.
12	Gérard Besnard (FRA)	61
13	Jacques Botherel (FRA)	71
14	Yves Hézard (FRA)	DNF
15	Robert Mintkiewicz (FRA)	80
16	Raymond Riotte (FRA)	78
17	Michel Roques (FRA)	51
18	Tino Tabak (NED)	DNF
19	Willy Teirlinck (BEL)	60
20	Claude Tollet (FRA)	48
21	Lucien Van Impe (BEL)	5
22	Willy Van Neste (BEL)	DNF

Carpenter–Shimano–Flandria
No.	Rider	Pos.
23	Wilfried David (BEL)	74
24	Lucien De Brauwere (BEL)	DNF
25	Ludo Delcroix (BEL)	DNF
26	Marc Demeyer (BEL)	72
27	Ronald De Witte (BEL)	24
28	Daniel Ducreux (FRA)	55
29	Walter Godefroot (BEL)	65
30	Fernando Mendes (POR)	18
31	Michel Pollentier (BEL)	34
32	Jean-Jacques Sanquer (FRA)	62
33	Ronny Van Marcke (BEL)	DNF

Peugeot–BP
No.	Rider	Pos.
34	Robert Bouloux (FRA)	56
35	Jean-Pierre Danguillaume (FRA)	22
36	Raymond Delisle (FRA)	11
37	Jacques Esclassan (FRA)	68
38	Pierre Martelozzo (FRA)	30
39	André Mollet (FRA)	69
40	Régis Ovion (FRA)	10
41	Jean-Pierre Paranteau (FRA)	DNF
42	Charles Rouxel (FRA)	36
43	Bernard Thévenet (FRA)	2
44	Jürgen Tschan (FRG)	37

Bic
No.	Rider	Pos.
45	Joaquim Agostinho (POR)	8
46	Roland Berland (FRA)	28
47	José Catieau (FRA)	14
48	Jean-Claude Genty (FRA)	27
49	Bernard Labourdette (FRA)	21
50	Leif Mortensen (DEN)	19
51	Luis Ocaña (ESP)	1
52	Alain Santy (FRA)	31
53	Guy Santy (FRA)	77
54	Johny Schleck (LUX)	32
55	Sylvain Vasseur (FRA)	53

Watney–Maes
No.	Rider	Pos.
56	Willy Abbeloos (BEL)	DNF
57	Paul Aerts (BEL)	DNF
58	Émile Bodart (BEL)	DNF
59	Michel Coulon (BEL)	DNF
60	André Doyen (BEL)	DNF
61	Englebert Opdebeeck (BEL)	DNF
62	Walter Planckaert (BEL)	DNF
63	Gustaaf Van Cauter (BEL)	DNF
64	Ludo Van Staeyen (BEL)	DNF
65	Frans Verbeeck (BEL)	DNF
66	Eddy Verstraeten (BEL)	DNF

Rokado
No.	Rider	Pos.
67	Willy De Geest (BEL)	DNF
68	Alfred Gaida (FRG)	81
69	Roger Gilson (LUX)	DNF
70	Antoon Houbrechts (BEL)	16
71	Pieter Nassen (BEL)	DNF
72	Wilfried Peffgen (FRG)	DNF
73	Georges Pintens (BEL)	DNF
74	Wim Schepers (NED)	DNF
75	Staf Van Roosbroeck (BEL)	66
76	Herman Van Springel (BEL)	6
77	Albert Van Vlierberghe (BEL)	52

Gitane–Frigécrème
No.	Rider	Pos.
78	Joaquim Andrade (POR)	64
79	Gilbert Bellone (FRA)	DNF
80	Francis Campaner (FRA)	73
81	Ferdinand Julien (FRA)	42
82	Jean-Claude Largeau (FRA)	49
83	Raymond Martin (FRA)	35
84	Joël Millard (FRA)	DNF
85	Alain Nogues (FRA)	63
86	Gerard Vianen (NED)	59
87	Michael Wright (GBR)	57
88	Joop Zoetemelk (NED)	4

Canada Dry–Gazelle
No.	Rider	Pos.
89	Matthijs de Koning (NED)	DNF
90	Ben Janbroers (NED)	DNF
91	Wim Kelleners (NED)	DNF
92	Jan Krekels (NED)	75
93	José Martins (POR)	33
94	Ludovic Noels (BEL)	DNF
95	Herculano de Oliveira (POR)	45
96	Wim Prinsen (NED)	DNF
97	Mathieu Pustjens (NED)	DNF
98	Theo Van Der Leeuw (NED)	70
99	Jo Vrancken (NED)	DNF

De Kova–Lejeune
No.	Rider	Pos.
100	Lucien Aimar (FRA)	17
101	Jean-Claude Baud (FRA)	85
102	Christian Blain (FRA)	58
103	Jean-Claude Blocher (FRA)	86
104	Marcel Boishardy (FRA)	44
105	Joseph Carletti (FRA)	DNF
106	Andrés Gandarias (ESP)	DNF
107	Noël Geneste (FRA)	84
108	Charles Genthon (FRA)	83
109	Jacques-André Hochart (FRA)	87
110	Richard Podesta (FRA)	DNF

Kas
No.	Rider	Pos.
111	Gonzalo Aja (ESP)	DNF
112	José Manuel Fuente (ESP)	3
113	Francisco Galdós (ESP)	20
114	José Antonio González (ESP)	47
115	José Grande (ESP)	50
116	Santiago Lazcano (ESP)	29
117	Vicente López Carril (ESP)	9
118	Antonio Martos (ESP)	15
119	Carlos Melero (ESP)	41
120	Antonio Menéndez (ESP)	40
121	Luis Zubero (ESP)	23

La Casera–Bahamontes
No.	Rider	Pos.
122	José Luis Abilleira (ESP)	DNF
123	Luis Balagué (ESP)	25
124	Jesús Esperanza (ESP)	54
125	José Gómez (ESP)	DNF
126	Félix González (ESP)	DNF
127	Jesús Manzaneque (ESP)	39
128	Agustín Tamames (ESP)	DNF
129	Damaso Torres (ESP)	38
130	Pedro Torres (ESP)	13
131	José Viejo (ESP)	DNF
132	Juan Zurano (ESP)	DNF

=== By rider ===
Legend
No.	Starting number worn by the rider during the Tour
Pos.	Position in the general classification
DNF	Denotes a rider who did not finish

No.	Name	Nationality	Team	Pos.	Ref
1	Raymond Poulidor	France	Gan–Mercier	DNF	
2	Régis Delépine	France	Gan–Mercier	82	
3	Jean-Pierre Genet	France	Gan–Mercier	46	
4	René Grelin	France	Gan–Mercier	26	
5	Charly Grosskost	France	Gan–Mercier	67	
6	Cyrille Guimard	France	Gan–Mercier	DNF	
7	Barry Hoban	Great Britain	Gan–Mercier	43	
8	Mariano Martínez	France	Gan–Mercier	12	
9	Gérard Moneyron	France	Gan–Mercier	79	
10	Jack Mourioux	France	Gan–Mercier	76	
11	Michel Périn	France	Gan–Mercier	7	
12	Gérard Besnard	France	Sonolor	61	
13	Jacques Botherel	France	Sonolor	71	
14	Yves Hézard	France	Sonolor	DNF	
15	Robert Mintkiewicz	France	Sonolor	80	
16	Raymond Riotte	France	Sonolor	78	
17	Michel Roques	France	Sonolor	51	
18	Tino Tabak	Netherlands	Sonolor	DNF	
19	Willy Teirlinck	Belgium	Sonolor	60	
20	Claude Tollet	France	Sonolor	48	
21	Lucien Van Impe	Belgium	Sonolor	5	
22	Willy Van Neste	Belgium	Sonolor	DNF	
23	Wilfried David	Belgium	Carpenter–Shimano–Flandria	74	
24	Lucien De Brauwere	Belgium	Carpenter–Shimano–Flandria	DNF	
25	Ludo Delcroix	Belgium	Carpenter–Shimano–Flandria	DNF	
26	Marc Demeyer	Belgium	Carpenter–Shimano–Flandria	72	
27	Ronald De Witte	Belgium	Carpenter–Shimano–Flandria	24	
28	Daniel Ducreux	France	Carpenter–Shimano–Flandria	55	
29	Walter Godefroot	Belgium	Carpenter–Shimano–Flandria	65	
30	Fernando Mendes	Portugal	Carpenter–Shimano–Flandria	18	
31	Michel Pollentier	Belgium	Carpenter–Shimano–Flandria	34	
32	Jean-Jacques Sanquer	France	Carpenter–Shimano–Flandria	62	
33	Ronny Van Marcke	Belgium	Carpenter–Shimano–Flandria	DNF	
34	Robert Bouloux	France	Peugeot–BP	56	
35	Jean-Pierre Danguillaume	France	Peugeot–BP	22	
36	Raymond Delisle	France	Peugeot–BP	11	
37	Jacques Esclassan	France	Peugeot–BP	68	
38	Pierre Martelozzo	France	Peugeot–BP	30	
39	André Mollet	France	Peugeot–BP	69	
40	Régis Ovion	France	Peugeot–BP	10	
41	Jean-Pierre Paranteau	France	Peugeot–BP	DNF	
42	Charles Rouxel	France	Peugeot–BP	36	
43	Bernard Thévenet	France	Peugeot–BP	2	
44	Jürgen Tschan	West Germany	Peugeot–BP	37	
45	Joaquim Agostinho	Portugal	Bic	8	
46	Roland Berland	France	Bic	28	
47	José Catieau	France	Bic	14	
48	Jean-Claude Genty	France	Bic	27	
49	Bernard Labourdette	France	Bic	21	
50	Leif Mortensen	Denmark	Bic	19	
51	Luis Ocaña	Spain	Bic	1	
52	Alain Santy	France	Bic	31	
53	Guy Santy	France	Bic	77	
54	Johny Schleck	Luxembourg	Bic	32	
55	Sylvain Vasseur	France	Bic	53	
56	Willy Abbeloos	Belgium	Watney–Maes	DNF	
57	Paul Aerts	Belgium	Watney–Maes	DNF	
58	Émile Bodart	Belgium	Watney–Maes	DNF	
59	Michel Coulon	Belgium	Watney–Maes	DNF	
60	André Doyen	Belgium	Watney–Maes	DNF	
61	Englebert Opdebeeck	Belgium	Watney–Maes	DNF	
62	Walter Planckaert	Belgium	Watney–Maes	DNF	
63	Gustaaf Van Cauter	Belgium	Watney–Maes	DNF	
64	Ludo Van Staeyen	Belgium	Watney–Maes	DNF	
65	Frans Verbeeck	Belgium	Watney–Maes	DNF	
66	Eddy Verstraeten	Belgium	Watney–Maes	DNF	
67	Willy De Geest	Belgium	Rokado	DNF	
68	Alfred Gaida	West Germany	Rokado	81	
69	Roger Gilson	Luxembourg	Rokado	DNF	
70	Antoon Houbrechts	Belgium	Rokado	16	
71	Pieter Nassen	Belgium	Rokado	DNF	
72	Wilfried Peffgen	West Germany	Rokado	DNF	
73	Georges Pintens	Belgium	Rokado	DNF	
74	Wim Schepers	Netherlands	Rokado	DNF	
75	Staf Van Roosbroeck	Belgium	Rokado	66	
76	Herman Van Springel	Belgium	Rokado	6	
77	Albert Van Vlierberghe	Belgium	Rokado	52	
78	Joaquim Andrade	Portugal	Gitane–Frigécrème	64	
79	Gilbert Bellone	France	Gitane–Frigécrème	DNF	
80	Francis Campaner	France	Gitane–Frigécrème	73	
81	Ferdinand Julien	France	Gitane–Frigécrème	42	
82	Jean-Claude Largeau	France	Gitane–Frigécrème	49	
83	Raymond Martin	France	Gitane–Frigécrème	35	
84	Joël Millard	France	Gitane–Frigécrème	DNF	
85	Alain Nogues	France	Gitane–Frigécrème	63	
86	Gerard Vianen	Netherlands	Gitane–Frigécrème	59	
87	Michael Wright	Great Britain	Gitane–Frigécrème	57	
88	Joop Zoetemelk	Netherlands	Gitane–Frigécrème	4	
89	Matthijs de Koning	Netherlands	Canada Dry–Gazelle	DNF	
90	Ben Janbroers	Netherlands	Canada Dry–Gazelle	DNF	
91	Wim Kelleners	Netherlands	Canada Dry–Gazelle	DNF	
92	Jan Krekels	Netherlands	Canada Dry–Gazelle	75	
93	José Freitas Martins	Portugal	Canada Dry–Gazelle	33	
94	Ludovic Noels	Belgium	Canada Dry–Gazelle	DNF	
95	Herculano de Oliveira	Portugal	Canada Dry–Gazelle	45	
96	Wim Prinsen	Netherlands	Canada Dry–Gazelle	DNF	
97	Mathieu Pustjens	Netherlands	Canada Dry–Gazelle	DNF	
98	Theo Van Der Leeuw	Netherlands	Canada Dry–Gazelle	70	
99	Jo Vrancken	Netherlands	Canada Dry–Gazelle	DNF	
100	Lucien Aimar	France	De Kova–Lejeune	17	
101	Jean-Claude Baud	France	De Kova–Lejeune	85	
102	Christian Blain	France	De Kova–Lejeune	58	
103	Jean-Claude Blocher	France	De Kova–Lejeune	86	
104	Marcel Boishardy	France	De Kova–Lejeune	44	
105	Joseph Carletti	France	De Kova–Lejeune	DNF	
106	Andrés Gandarias	Spain	De Kova–Lejeune	DNF	
107	Noël Geneste	France	De Kova–Lejeune	84	
108	Charles Genthon	France	De Kova–Lejeune	83	
109	Jacques-André Hochart	France	De Kova–Lejeune	87	
110	Richard Podesta	France	De Kova–Lejeune	DNF	
111	Gonzalo Aja	Spain	Kas	DNF	
112	José Manuel Fuente	Spain	Kas	3	
113	Francisco Galdós	Spain	Kas	20	
114	José Antonio González	Spain	Kas	47	
115	José Grande	Spain	Kas	50	
116	Santiago Lazcano	Spain	Kas	29	
117	Vicente López Carril	Spain	Kas	9	
118	Antonio Martos	Spain	Kas	15	
119	Carlos Melero	Spain	Kas	41	
120	Antonio Menéndez	Spain	Kas	40	
121	Luis Zubero	Spain	Kas	23	
122	José Luis Abilleira	Spain	La Casera–Bahamontes	DNF	
123	Luis Balagué	Spain	La Casera–Bahamontes	25	
124	Jesús Esperanza	Spain	La Casera–Bahamontes	54	
125	José Gómez	Spain	La Casera–Bahamontes	DNF	
126	Félix González	Spain	La Casera–Bahamontes	DNF	
127	Jesús Manzaneque	Spain	La Casera–Bahamontes	39	
128	Agustín Tamames	Spain	La Casera–Bahamontes	DNF	
129	Dámaso Torres	Spain	La Casera–Bahamontes	38	
130	Pedro Torres	Spain	La Casera–Bahamontes	13	
131	José Viejo	Spain	La Casera–Bahamontes	DNF	
132	Juan Zurano	Spain	La Casera–Bahamontes	DNF	
