= List of teams and cyclists in the 1972 Tour de France =

List of cyclists

The 1972 Tour de France started with the following 12 teams, each with 11 cyclists:

- Molteni
- Beaulieu–Flandria
- Sonolor
- Peugeot–BP–Michelin
- De Gribaldy–Magniflex–Van Cauter
- Bic
- Gan–Mercier–Hutchinson
- Rokado
- Salvarani
- Goudsmit–Hoff
- Gitane
- Watney–Avia

In the previous year, Ocana was on his way to beat Merckx, when he fell as leader and had to give up. Everybody expected Merckx and Ocana to battle for the victory in 1972. Ocana felt that he could have won the 1971 Tour, and Merckx did not like the comments that he did not deserve the 1971 victory, and both wanted to show their strengths. Merckx had won important races before the Tour started, including the 1972 Giro d'Italia, and was also the reigning world champion. Ocana had won less races, but won the Criterium du Dauphiné Libéré.

The most important other participants were considered Raymond Poulidor, Felice Gimondi, Joop Zoetemelk and Bernard Thévenet.

José Manuel Fuente, who had won the 1972 Vuelta a España and finished second in the 1972 Giro d'Italia, did not compete, as his team decided they had already been in too many hard races.

Herman Van Springel had announced four days prior to the Tour that he would leave his team after his contract would end at the end of 1972. His team then removed him from the Tour squad.

== Start list ==
=== By team ===
Molteni
No.	Rider	Pos.
1	Eddy Merckx (BEL)	1
2	Joseph Bruyère (BEL)	26
3	Jos Deschoenmaecker (BEL)	22
4	Jos Huysmans (BEL)	28
5	Willy In 't Ven (BEL)	51
6	Marc Lievens (BEL)	43
7	Frans Mintjens (BEL)	37
8	Jozef Spruyt (BEL)	DNF
9	Roger Swerts (BEL)	14
10	Martin Van Den Bossche (BEL)	15
11	Victor Van Schil (BEL)	DNF

Beaulieu–Flandria
No.	Rider	Pos.
12	Joaquim Andrade (POR)	DNF
13	Gérard David (BEL)	59
14	Johan De Muynck (BEL)	DNF
15	André Dierickx (BEL)	DNF
16	Evert Dolman (NED)	83
17	Fernando Mendes (POR)	DNF
18	Jan Van De Wiele (BEL)	DNF
19	Herman Van Der Slagmolen (BEL)	DNF
20	Ronny Van Marcke (BEL)	62
21	Willy Van Neste (BEL)	33
22	Joop Zoetemelk (NED)	5

Sonolor
No.	Rider	Pos.
23	José Catieau (FRA)	DNF
24	Bernard Guyot (FRA)	81
25	Yves Hézard (FRA)	7
26	Robert Mintkiewicz (FRA)	87
27	Mathieu Pustjens (NED)	25
28	Walter Ricci (FRA)	27
29	Raymond Riotte (FRA)	48
30	Jean-Jacques Sanquer (FRA)	DNF
31	Willy Teirlinck (BEL)	66
32	Lucien Van Impe (BEL)	4
33	Daniel Van Ryckeghem (BEL)	DNF

Peugeot–BP–Michelin
No.	Rider	Pos.
34	Robert Bouloux (FRA)	DNF
35	Jean-Pierre Danguillaume (FRA)	21
36	Wilfried David (BEL)	41
37	Raymond Delisle (FRA)	11
38	Ronald De Witte (BEL)	31
39	Walter Godefroot (BEL)	44
40	Jean-Pierre Paranteau (FRA)	38
41	Roger Pingeon (FRA)	DNF
42	Christian Raymond (FRA)	47
43	Bernard Thévenet (FRA)	9
44	Jürgen Tschan (FRG)	45

De Gribaldy–Magniflex–Van Cauter
No.	Rider	Pos.
45	Willy Abbeloos (BEL)	65
46	Joaquim Agostinho (POR)	8
47	Herman Beysens (BEL)	23
48	Edward Janssens (BEL)	10
49	Roger Kindt (BEL)	DNF
50	Mariano Martínez (FRA)	6
51	Joël Millard (FRA)	32
52	Jean-Claude Largeau (FRA)	46
53	André Poppe (BEL)	DNF
54	Rik Van Linden (BEL)	80
55	Ludo Van Staeyen (BEL)	49

Bic
No.	Rider	Pos.
56	Jesús Aranzabal (ESP)	56
57	Roland Berland (FRA)	40
58	Jean-Claude Genty (FRA)	64
59	Bernard Labourdette (FRA)	DNF
60	Désiré Letort (FRA)	DNF
61	Leif Mortensen (DEN)	12
62	Luis Ocaña (ESP)	DNF
63	Alain Santy (FRA)	DNF
64	Guy Santy (FRA)	29
65	Johny Schleck (LUX)	30
66	Sylvain Vasseur (FRA)	35

Gan–Mercier–Hutchinson
No.	Rider	Pos.
67	Jacques Cadiou (FRA)	DNF
68	Régis Delépine (FRA)	76
69	Jean-Pierre Genet (FRA)	DNF
70	René Grelin (FRA)	DNF
71	Cyrille Guimard (FRA)	DNF
72	Barry Hoban (GBR)	70
73	Gérard Moneyron (FRA)	36
74	Jack Mourioux (FRA)	58
75	Michel Périn (FRA)	19
76	Raymond Poulidor (FRA)	3
77	Yves Ravaleu (FRA)	DNF

Rokado
No.	Rider	Pos.
78	Lucien Aimar (FRA)	17
79	Gilbert Bellone (FRA)	34
80	Hans Junkermann (FRG)	DNF
81	Gerben Karstens (NED)	60
82	Karl-Heinz Kunde (FRG)	20
83	Karl-Heinz Muddemann (FRG)	52
84	Wilfried Peffgen (FRG)	63
85	Dieter Puschel (FRG)	42
86	Bernd Rasing (FRG)	DNF
87	Wim Schepers (NED)	DNF
88	Rolf Wolfshohl (FRG)	24

Salvarani
No.	Rider	Pos.
89	Marino Basso (ITA)	82
90	Pietro Campagnari (ITA)	74
91	Luigi Castelletti (ITA)	85
92	Felice Gimondi (ITA)	2
93	Ercole Gualazzini (ITA)	DNF
94	Pietro Guerra (ITA)	86
95	Antoon Houbrechts (BEL)	13
96	Primo Mori (ITA)	39
97	Guido Reybrouck (BEL)	DNF
98	Giacinto Santambrogio (ITA)	53
99	Italo Zilioli (ITA)	DNF

Goudsmit–Hoff
No.	Rider	Pos.
100	Leo Duyndam (NED)	DNF
101	Ger Harings (NED)	DNF
102	Cees Koeken (NED)	DNF
103	Jan Krekels (NED)	78
104	Wim Prinsen (NED)	61
105	Tino Tabak (NED)	18
106	Jos van der Vleuten (NED)	73
107	Jan van Katwijk (NED)	DNF
108	Harry van Leeuwen (NED)	DNF
109	Gerard Vianen (NED)	71
110	Marinus Wagtmans (NED)	54

Gitane
No.	Rider	Pos.
111	Alain Bellouis (FRA)	88
112	Serge Bolley (FRA)	DNF
113	Gérard Briend (FRA)	DNF
114	Georges Chappe (FRA)	50
115	Jean-Claude Daunat (FRA)	72
116	René Grenier (FRA)	57
117	Loïc Le Bourhis (FRA)	DNF
118	Pierre Matignon (FRA)	75
119	Léon-Paul Ménard (FRA)	84
120	Jean Vidament (FRA)	DNF
121	Michael Wright (GBR)	55

Watney–Avia
No.	Rider	Pos.
122	Paul Aerts (BEL)	69
123	Etienne Antheunis (BEL)	DNF
124	Michel Coulon (BEL)	DNF
125	Pieter Nassen (BEL)	79
126	Englebert Opdebeeck (BEL)	DNF
127	Walter Planckaert (BEL)	DNF
128	Marc Sohet (BEL)	68
129	Noël Van Clooster (BEL)	77
130	Willy Van Malderghem (BEL)	DNF
131	Frans Verbeeck (BEL)	16
132	Eddy Verstraeten (BEL)	67

=== By rider ===
Legend
No.	Starting number worn by the rider during the Tour
Pos.	Position in the general classification
DNF	Denotes a rider who did not finish

No.	Name	Nationality	Team	Pos.	Ref
1	Eddy Merckx	Belgium	Molteni	1	
2	Joseph Bruyère	Belgium	Molteni	26	
3	Jos Deschoenmaecker	Belgium	Molteni	22	
4	Jos Huysmans	Belgium	Molteni	28	
5	Willy In 't Ven	Belgium	Molteni	51	
6	Marc Lievens	Belgium	Molteni	43	
7	Frans Mintjens	Belgium	Molteni	37	
8	Jozef Spruyt	Belgium	Molteni	DNF	
9	Roger Swerts	Belgium	Molteni	14	
10	Martin Van Den Bossche	Belgium	Molteni	15	
11	Victor Van Schil	Belgium	Molteni	DNF	
12	Joaquim Andrade	Portugal	Beaulieu–Flandria	DNF	
13	Gérard David	Belgium	Beaulieu–Flandria	59	
14	Johan De Muynck	Belgium	Beaulieu–Flandria	DNF	
15	André Dierickx	Belgium	Beaulieu–Flandria	DNF	
16	Evert Dolman	Netherlands	Beaulieu–Flandria	83	
17	Fernando Mendes	Portugal	Beaulieu–Flandria	DNF	
18	Jan Van De Wiele	Belgium	Beaulieu–Flandria	DNF	
19	Herman Van Der Slagmolen	Belgium	Beaulieu–Flandria	DNF	
20	Ronny Van Marcke	Belgium	Beaulieu–Flandria	62	
21	Willy Van Neste	Belgium	Beaulieu–Flandria	33	
22	Joop Zoetemelk	Netherlands	Beaulieu–Flandria	5	
23	José Catieau	France	Sonolor	DNF	
24	Bernard Guyot	France	Sonolor	81	
25	Yves Hézard	France	Sonolor	7	
26	Robert Mintkiewicz	France	Sonolor	87	
27	Mathieu Pustjens	Netherlands	Sonolor	25	
28	Walter Ricci	France	Sonolor	27	
29	Raymond Riotte	France	Sonolor	48	
30	Jean-Jacques Sanquer	France	Sonolor	DNF	
31	Willy Teirlinck	Belgium	Sonolor	66	
32	Lucien Van Impe	Belgium	Sonolor	4	
33	Daniel Van Ryckeghem	Belgium	Sonolor	DNF	
34	Robert Bouloux	France	Peugeot–BP–Michelin	DNF	
35	Jean-Pierre Danguillaume	France	Peugeot–BP–Michelin	21	
36	Wilfried David	Belgium	Peugeot–BP–Michelin	41	
37	Raymond Delisle	France	Peugeot–BP–Michelin	11	
38	Ronald De Witte	Belgium	Peugeot–BP–Michelin	31	
39	Walter Godefroot	Belgium	Peugeot–BP–Michelin	44	
40	Jean-Pierre Paranteau	France	Peugeot–BP–Michelin	38	
41	Roger Pingeon	France	Peugeot–BP–Michelin	DNF	
42	Christian Raymond	France	Peugeot–BP–Michelin	47	
43	Bernard Thévenet	France	Peugeot–BP–Michelin	9	
44	Jürgen Tschan	West Germany	Peugeot–BP–Michelin	45	
45	Willy Abbeloos	Belgium	De Gribaldy–Magniflex–Van Cauter	65	
46	Joaquim Agostinho	Portugal	De Gribaldy–Magniflex–Van Cauter	8	
47	Herman Beysens	Belgium	De Gribaldy–Magniflex–Van Cauter	23	
48	Edward Janssens	Belgium	De Gribaldy–Magniflex–Van Cauter	10	
49	Roger Kindt	Belgium	De Gribaldy–Magniflex–Van Cauter	DNF	
50	Mariano Martínez	France	De Gribaldy–Magniflex–Van Cauter	6	
51	Joël Millard	France	De Gribaldy–Magniflex–Van Cauter	32	
52	Jean-Claude Largeau	France	De Gribaldy–Magniflex–Van Cauter	46	
53	André Poppe	Belgium	De Gribaldy–Magniflex–Van Cauter	DNF	
54	Rik Van Linden	Belgium	De Gribaldy–Magniflex–Van Cauter	80	
55	Ludo Van Staeyen	Belgium	De Gribaldy–Magniflex–Van Cauter	49	
56	Jesús Aranzabal	Spain	Bic	56	
57	Roland Berland	France	Bic	40	
58	Jean-Claude Genty	France	Bic	64	
59	Bernard Labourdette	France	Bic	DNF	
60	Désiré Letort	France	Bic	DNF	
61	Leif Mortensen	Denmark	Bic	12	
62	Luis Ocaña	Spain	Bic	DNF	
63	Alain Santy	France	Bic	DNF	
64	Guy Santy	France	Bic	29	
65	Johny Schleck	Luxembourg	Bic	30	
66	Sylvain Vasseur	France	Bic	35	
67	Jacques Cadiou	France	Gan–Mercier–Hutchinson	DNF	
68	Régis Delépine	France	Gan–Mercier–Hutchinson	76	
69	Jean-Pierre Genet	France	Gan–Mercier–Hutchinson	DNF	
70	René Grelin	France	Gan–Mercier–Hutchinson	DNF	
71	Cyrille Guimard	France	Gan–Mercier–Hutchinson	DNF	
72	Barry Hoban	Great Britain	Gan–Mercier–Hutchinson	70	
73	Gérard Moneyron	France	Gan–Mercier–Hutchinson	36	
74	Jack Mourioux	France	Gan–Mercier–Hutchinson	58	
75	Michel Périn	France	Gan–Mercier–Hutchinson	19	
76	Raymond Poulidor	France	Gan–Mercier–Hutchinson	3	
77	Yves Ravaleu	France	Gan–Mercier–Hutchinson	DNF	
78	Lucien Aimar	France	Rokado	17	
79	Gilbert Bellone	France	Rokado	34	
80	Hans Junkermann	West Germany	Rokado	DNF	
81	Gerben Karstens	Netherlands	Rokado	60	
82	Karl-Heinz Kunde	West Germany	Rokado	20	
83	Karl-Heinz Muddemann	West Germany	Rokado	52	
84	Wilfried Peffgen	West Germany	Rokado	63	
85	Dieter Puschel	West Germany	Rokado	42	
86	Bernd Rasing	West Germany	Rokado	DNF	
87	Wim Schepers	Netherlands	Rokado	DNF	
88	Rolf Wolfshohl	West Germany	Rokado	24	
89	Marino Basso	Italy	Salvarani	82	
90	Pietro Campagnari	Italy	Salvarani	74	
91	Luigi Castelletti	Italy	Salvarani	85	
92	Felice Gimondi	Italy	Salvarani	2	
93	Ercole Gualazzini	Italy	Salvarani	DNF	
94	Pietro Guerra	Italy	Salvarani	86	
95	Antoon Houbrechts	Belgium	Salvarani	13	
96	Primo Mori	Italy	Salvarani	39	
97	Guido Reybrouck	Belgium	Salvarani	DNF	
98	Giacinto Santambrogio	Italy	Salvarani	53	
99	Italo Zilioli	Italy	Salvarani	DNF	
100	Leo Duyndam	Netherlands	Goudsmit–Hoff	DNF	
101	Ger Harings	Netherlands	Goudsmit–Hoff	DNF	
102	Cees Koeken	Netherlands	Goudsmit–Hoff	DNF	
103	Jan Krekels	Netherlands	Goudsmit–Hoff	78	
104	Wim Prinsen	Netherlands	Goudsmit–Hoff	61	
105	Tino Tabak	Netherlands	Goudsmit–Hoff	18	
106	Jos van der Vleuten	Netherlands	Goudsmit–Hoff	73	
107	Jan van Katwijk	Netherlands	Goudsmit–Hoff	DNF	
108	Harrie Van Leeuwen	Netherlands	Goudsmit–Hoff	DNF	
109	Gerard Vianen	Netherlands	Goudsmit–Hoff	71	
110	Marinus Wagtmans	Netherlands	Goudsmit–Hoff	54	
111	Alain Bellouis	France	Gitane	88	
112	Serge Bolley	France	Gitane	DNF	
113	Gérard Briend	France	Gitane	DNF	
114	Georges Chappe	France	Gitane	50	
115	Jean-Claude Daunat	France	Gitane	72	
116	René Grenier	France	Gitane	57	
117	Loïc Le Bourhis	France	Gitane	DNF	
118	Pierre Matignon	France	Gitane	75	
119	Léon-Paul Ménard	France	Gitane	84	
120	Jean Vidament	France	Gitane	DNF	
121	Michael Wright	Great Britain	Gitane	55	
122	Paul Aerts	Belgium	Watney–Avia	69	
123	Etienne Antheunis	Belgium	Watney–Avia	DNF	
124	Michel Coulon	Belgium	Watney–Avia	DNF	
125	Pieter Nassen	Belgium	Watney–Avia	79	
126	Englebert Opdebeeck	Belgium	Watney–Avia	DNF	
127	Walter Planckaert	Belgium	Watney–Avia	DNF	
128	Marc Sohet	Belgium	Watney–Avia	68	
129	Noël Van Clooster	Belgium	Watney–Avia	77	
130	Willy Van Malderghem	Belgium	Watney–Avia	DNF	
131	Frans Verbeeck	Belgium	Watney–Avia	16	
132	Eddy Verstraeten	Belgium	Watney–Avia	67	
