= List of teams and cyclists in the 1974 Tour de France =

List of cyclists

The 1974 Tour de France had 13 teams, with 10 cyclists each:

- Molteni
- Bic
- Peugeot–BP
- Kas
- Sonolor–Gitane
- Mic–De Gribaldy–Ludo
- Gan–Mercier
- La Casera–Bahamontes
- Flandria–Shimano–Merlin Plage
- Brooklyn
- Lejeune–Jobo
- Carpenter–Confortluxe
- Frisol

Merckx, who had been absent in 1973 after winning four Tours in a row, was present again. Merckx had not been as dominant in the spring as in other years; it was his first year as a professional cyclist in which he did not win a spring classic. He did win the 1974 Giro d'Italia and the Tour de Suisse, but after winning the latter he required surgery on the perineum, five days before the 1974 Tour started.

Notable absents were Ocaña and Zoetemelk. Zoetemelk was injured during the Midi Libre and was in hospital with life-threatening meningitis. Ocaña had crashed in the Tour de l'Aude, gone home and was fired by his team for not communicating. Bernard Thévenet, who was considered a potential winner, had crashed several times in the 1974 Vuelta a España. He did start in the Tour, but was not yet back at his former level.

== Start list ==
=== By team ===
Molteni
No.	Rider	Pos.
1	Eddy Merckx (BEL)	1
2	Joseph Bruyère (BEL)	21
3	Ludo Delcroix (BEL)	58
4	Jos Deschoenmaecker (BEL)	45
5	Jos Huysmans (BEL)	66
6	Edward Janssens (BEL)	22
7	Marc Lievens (BEL)	35
8	Frans Mintjens (BEL)	83
9	Jozef Spruyt (BEL)	50
10	Victor Van Schil (BEL)	36

Bic
No.	Rider	Pos.
11	Joaquim Agostinho (POR)	6
12	Roland Berland (FRA)	33
13	José Catieau (FRA)	28
14	Bernard Croyet (FRA)	92
15	Gerben Karstens (NED)	61
16	Bernard Labourdette (FRA)	20
17	Jean-Luc Molinéris (FRA)	DNF
18	Leif Mortensen (DEN)	DNF
19	Alain Vasseur (FRA)	81
20	Sylvain Vasseur (FRA)	51

Peugeot–BP
No.	Rider	Pos.
21	Bernard Thévenet (FRA)	DNF
22	Bernard Bourreau (FRA)	52
23	Jean-Pierre Danguillaume (FRA)	13
24	Raymond Delisle (FRA)	12
25	Jacques Esclassan (FRA)	75
26	André Mollet (FRA)	59
27	Régis Ovion (FRA)	34
28	Raymond Riotte (FRA)	79
29	Charles Rouxel (FRA)	74
30	Guy Sibille (FRA)	71

Kas
No.	Rider	Pos.
31	Miguel María Lasa (ESP)	17
32	Gonzalo Aja (ESP)	5
33	Francisco Galdós (ESP)	DNF
34	Vicente López Carril (ESP)	3
35	Antonio Martos (ESP)	40
36	Carlos Melero (ESP)	49
37	Antonio Menéndez (ESP)	54
38	Domingo Perurena (ESP)	44
39	José Pesarrodona (ESP)	29
40	Luis Zubero (ESP)	42

Sonolor–Gitane
No.	Rider	Pos.
41	Lucien Van Impe (BEL)	18
42	Jacques Botherel (FRA)	86
43	Ferdinand Julien (FRA)	32
44	Mariano Martínez (FRA)	8
45	Robert Mintkiewicz (FRA)	87
46	Alain Nogues (FRA)	64
47	Willy Teirlinck (BEL)	65
48	Claude Tollet (FRA)	DNF
49	Willy Van Neste (BEL)	24
50	Michael Wright (GBR)	57

Mic–De Gribaldy–Ludo
No.	Rider	Pos.
51	Herman Van Springel (BEL)	10
52	Dirk Baert (BEL)	93
53	Eric Leman (BEL)	DNF
54	Herculano de Oliveira (POR)	DNF
55	Georges Pintens (BEL)	30
56	Noël Van Clooster (BEL)	70
57	Jan Van De Wiele (BEL)	53
58	Ronny Van Marcke (BEL)	88
59	Staf Van Roosbroeck (BEL)	63
60	Wilfried Wesemael (BEL)	73

Gan–Mercier
No.	Rider	Pos.
61	Raymond Poulidor (FRA)	2
62	Cees Bal (NED)	DNF
63	Jean-Pierre Genet (FRA)	67
64	Barry Hoban (GBR)	37
65	Gerrie Knetemann (NED)	38
66	Jack Mourioux (FRA)	80
67	Michel Périn (FRA)	16
68	Christian Raymond (FRA)	76
69	Alain Santy (FRA)	9
70	Gerard Vianen (NED)	56

La Casera–Bahamontes
No.	Rider	Pos.
71	Jesús Manzaneque (ESP)	46
72	José Luis Abilleira (ESP)	60
73	Jesús Esperanza (ESP)	DNF
74	Félix González (ESP)	DNF
75	Andrés Oliva (ESP)	19
76	Fernando Plaza (ESP)	94
77	Jose-Antonio Ponton (ESP)	DNF
78	Damaso Torres (ESP)	62
79	Antonio Vallori (ESP)	DNF
80	Juan Zurano (ESP)	14

Flandria–Shimano–Merlin Plage
No.	Rider	Pos.
81	Cyrille Guimard (FRA)	DNF
82	Michel Coroller (FRA)	95
83	Régis Delépine (FRA)	101
84	André Dierickx (BEL)	55
85	Joël Millard (FRA)	31
86	Jean-Claude Misac (FRA)	47
87	Gérard Moneyron (FRA)	72
88	Daniel Rébillard (FRA)	77
89	Jean-Jacques Sanquer (FRA)	68
90	Ghislain Van Landeghem (BEL)	DNF

Brooklyn
No.	Rider	Pos.
91	Wladimiro Panizza (ITA)	4
92	Giancarlo Bellini (ITA)	26
93	Fausto Bertoglio (ITA)	23
94	Gianni Di Lorenzo (ITA)	91
95	Ercole Gualazzini (ITA)	DNF
96	Valerio Lualdi (ITA)	69
97	Aldo Parecchini (ITA)	97
98	Arturo Pecchielan (ITA)	43
99	Attilio Rota (ITA)	DNF
100	Patrick Sercu (BEL)	89

Lejeune–Jobo
No.	Rider	Pos.
101	Roger Pingeon (FRA)	11
102	Christian Blain (FRA)	48
103	Jean-Claude Blocher (FRA)	DNF
104	Francis Campaner (FRA)	39
105	Alain Cigana (FRA)	98
106	Daniel Ducreux (FRA)	90
107	Jean-Pierre Guillemot (FRA)	85
108	Claude Magni (FRA)	82
109	Bernard Masson (FRA)	104
110	André Romero (FRA)	15

Carpenter–Confortluxe
No.	Rider	Pos.
111	Ronald De Witte (BEL)	25
112	Eddy Cael (BEL)	DNF
113	Wilfried David (BEL)	DNF
114	Lucien De Brauwere (BEL)	DNF
115	Marc Demeyer (BEL)	41
116	Michel Pollentier (BEL)	7
117	Arthur Van De Vijver (BEL)	96
118	Frans Van Looy (BEL)	99
119	Daniel Verplancke (BEL)	100
120	Roger Verschaeve (BEL)	DNF

Frisol
No.	Rider	Pos.
121	Fedor den Hertog (NED)	27
122	Lorenzo Alaimo (ITA)	105
123	Donald Allan (AUS)	103
124	Will De Vlam (NED)	DNF
125	Albertus Hulzebosch (NED)	DNF
126	Henk Poppe (NED)	DNF
127	Cees Priem (NED)	DNF
128	Henk Prinsen (NED)	84
129	Wim Prinsen (NED)	78
130	Piet van Katwijk (NED)	102

=== By rider ===
Legend
No.	Starting number worn by the rider during the Tour
Pos.	Position in the general classification
DNF	Denotes a rider who did not finish

No.	Name	Nationality	Team	Pos.	Ref
1	Eddy Merckx	Belgium	Molteni	1	
2	Joseph Bruyère	Belgium	Molteni	21	
3	Ludo Delcroix	Belgium	Molteni	58	
4	Jos Deschoenmaecker	Belgium	Molteni	45	
5	Jos Huysmans	Belgium	Molteni	66	
6	Edward Janssens	Belgium	Molteni	22	
7	Marc Lievens	Belgium	Molteni	35	
8	Frans Mintjens	Belgium	Molteni	83	
9	Jozef Spruyt	Belgium	Molteni	50	
10	Victor Van Schil	Belgium	Molteni	36	
11	Joaquim Agostinho	Portugal	Bic	6	
12	Roland Berland	France	Bic	33	
13	José Catieau	France	Bic	28	
14	Bernard Croyet	France	Bic	92	
15	Gerben Karstens	Netherlands	Bic	61	
16	Bernard Labourdette	France	Bic	20	
17	Jean-Luc Molinéris	France	Bic	DNF	
18	Leif Mortensen	Denmark	Bic	DNF	
19	Alain Vasseur	France	Bic	81	
20	Sylvain Vasseur	France	Bic	51	
21	Bernard Thévenet	France	Peugeot–BP	DNF	
22	Bernard Bourreau	France	Peugeot–BP	52	
23	Jean-Pierre Danguillaume	France	Peugeot–BP	13	
24	Raymond Delisle	France	Peugeot–BP	12	
25	Jacques Esclassan	France	Peugeot–BP	75	
26	André Mollet	France	Peugeot–BP	59	
27	Régis Ovion	France	Peugeot–BP	34	
28	Raymond Riotte	France	Peugeot–BP	79	
29	Charles Rouxel	France	Peugeot–BP	74	
30	Guy Sibille	France	Peugeot–BP	71	
31	Miguel María Lasa	Spain	Kas	17	
32	Gonzalo Aja	Spain	Kas	5	
33	Francisco Galdós	Spain	Kas	DNF	
34	Vicente López Carril	Spain	Kas	3	
35	Antonio Martos	Spain	Kas	40	
36	Carlos Melero	Spain	Kas	49	
37	Antonio Menéndez	Spain	Kas	54	
38	Domingo Perurena	Spain	Kas	44	
39	José Pesarrodona	Spain	Kas	29	
40	Luis Zubero	Spain	Kas	42	
41	Lucien Van Impe	Belgium	Sonolor–Gitane	18	
42	Jacques Botherel	France	Sonolor–Gitane	86	
43	Ferdinand Julien	France	Sonolor–Gitane	32	
44	Mariano Martínez	France	Sonolor–Gitane	8	
45	Robert Mintkiewicz	France	Sonolor–Gitane	87	
46	Alain Nogues	France	Sonolor–Gitane	64	
47	Willy Teirlinck	Belgium	Sonolor–Gitane	65	
48	Claude Tollet	France	Sonolor–Gitane	DNF	
49	Willy Van Neste	Belgium	Sonolor–Gitane	24	
50	Michael Wright	Great Britain	Sonolor–Gitane	57	
51	Herman Van Springel	Belgium	Mic–De Gribaldy–Ludo	10	
52	Dirk Baert	Belgium	Mic–De Gribaldy–Ludo	93	
53	Eric Leman	Belgium	Mic–De Gribaldy–Ludo	DNF	
54	Herculano de Oliveira	Portugal	Mic–De Gribaldy–Ludo	DNF	
55	Georges Pintens	Belgium	Mic–De Gribaldy–Ludo	30	
56	Noël Van Clooster	Belgium	Mic–De Gribaldy–Ludo	70	
57	Jan Van De Wiele	Belgium	Mic–De Gribaldy–Ludo	53	
58	Ronny Van Marcke	Belgium	Mic–De Gribaldy–Ludo	88	
59	Staf Van Roosbroeck	Belgium	Mic–De Gribaldy–Ludo	63	
60	Wilfried Wesemael	Belgium	Mic–De Gribaldy–Ludo	73	
61	Raymond Poulidor	France	Gan–Mercier	2	
62	Cees Bal	Netherlands	Gan–Mercier	DNF	
63	Jean-Pierre Genet	France	Gan–Mercier	67	
64	Barry Hoban	Great Britain	Gan–Mercier	37	
65	Gerrie Knetemann	Netherlands	Gan–Mercier	38	
66	Jack Mourioux	France	Gan–Mercier	80	
67	Michel Périn	France	Gan–Mercier	16	
68	Christian Raymond	France	Gan–Mercier	76	
69	Alain Santy	France	Gan–Mercier	9	
70	Gerard Vianen	Netherlands	Gan–Mercier	56	
71	Jesús Manzaneque	Spain	La Casera–Bahamontes	46	
72	José Luis Abilleira	Spain	La Casera–Bahamontes	60	
73	Jesús Esperanza	Spain	La Casera–Bahamontes	DNF	
74	Félix González	Spain	La Casera–Bahamontes	DNF	
75	Andrés Oliva	Spain	La Casera–Bahamontes	19	
76	Fernando Plaza	Spain	La Casera–Bahamontes	94	
77	José Antonio Pontón	Spain	La Casera–Bahamontes	DNF	
78	Damaso Torres	Spain	La Casera–Bahamontes	62	
79	Antonio Vallori	Spain	La Casera–Bahamontes	DNF	
80	Juan Zurano	Spain	La Casera–Bahamontes	14	
81	Cyrille Guimard	France	Flandria–Shimano–Merlin Plage	DNF	
82	Michel Coroller	France	Flandria–Shimano–Merlin Plage	95	
83	Régis Delépine	France	Flandria–Shimano–Merlin Plage	101	
84	André Dierickx	Belgium	Flandria–Shimano–Merlin Plage	55	
85	Joël Millard	France	Flandria–Shimano–Merlin Plage	31	
86	Jean-Claude Misac	France	Flandria–Shimano–Merlin Plage	47	
87	Gérard Moneyron	France	Flandria–Shimano–Merlin Plage	72	
88	Daniel Rébillard	France	Flandria–Shimano–Merlin Plage	77	
89	Jean-Jacques Sanquer	France	Flandria–Shimano–Merlin Plage	68	
90	Ghislain Van Landeghem	Belgium	Flandria–Shimano–Merlin Plage	DNF	
91	Wladimiro Panizza	Italy	Brooklyn	4	
92	Giancarlo Bellini	Italy	Brooklyn	26	
93	Fausto Bertoglio	Italy	Brooklyn	23	
94	Gianni Di Lorenzo	Italy	Brooklyn	91	
95	Ercole Gualazzini	Italy	Brooklyn	DNF	
96	Valerio Lualdi	Italy	Brooklyn	69	
97	Aldo Parecchini	Italy	Brooklyn	97	
98	Arturo Pecchielan	Italy	Brooklyn	43	
99	Attilio Rota	Italy	Brooklyn	DNF	
100	Patrick Sercu	Belgium	Brooklyn	89	
101	Roger Pingeon	France	Lejeune–Jobo	11	
102	Christian Blain	France	Lejeune–Jobo	48	
103	Jean-Claude Blocher	France	Lejeune–Jobo	DNF	
104	Francis Campaner	France	Lejeune–Jobo	39	
105	Alain Cigana	France	Lejeune–Jobo	98	
106	Daniel Ducreux	France	Lejeune–Jobo	90	
107	Jean-Pierre Guillemot	France	Lejeune–Jobo	85	
108	Claude Magni	France	Lejeune–Jobo	82	
109	Bernard Masson	France	Lejeune–Jobo	104	
110	André Romero	France	Lejeune–Jobo	15	
111	Ronald De Witte	Belgium	Carpenter–Confortluxe	25	
112	Eddy Cael	Belgium	Carpenter–Confortluxe	DNF	
113	Wilfried David	Belgium	Carpenter–Confortluxe	DNF	
114	Lucien De Brauwere	Belgium	Carpenter–Confortluxe	DNF	
115	Marc Demeyer	Belgium	Carpenter–Confortluxe	41	
116	Michel Pollentier	Belgium	Carpenter–Confortluxe	7	
117	Arthur Van De Vijver	Belgium	Carpenter–Confortluxe	96	
118	Frans Van Looy	Belgium	Carpenter–Confortluxe	99	
119	Daniel Verplancke	Belgium	Carpenter–Confortluxe	100	
120	Roger Verschaeve	Belgium	Carpenter–Confortluxe	DNF	
121	Fedor den Hertog	Netherlands	Frisol	27	
122	Lorenzo Alaimo	Italy	Frisol	105	
123	Donald Allan	Australia	Frisol	103	
124	Will De Vlam	Netherlands	Frisol	DNF	
125	Albert Hulzebosch	Netherlands	Frisol	DNF	
126	Henk Poppe	Netherlands	Frisol	DNF	
127	Cees Priem	Netherlands	Frisol	DNF	
128	Henk Prinsen	Netherlands	Frisol	84	
129	Wim Prinsen	Netherlands	Frisol	78	
130	Piet van Katwijk	Netherlands	Frisol	102	
