= List of Dutch cyclists =

This is a List of Dutch cyclists, ordered alphabetically.

== A ==
- André van Aert
- Jos van Aert
- John van den Akker
- Thijs Al
- Jos Alberts
- Marcel Arntz

== B ==
- Dylan van Baarle
- Henk Baars
- Maarten den Bakker
- Cees Bal
- Daniëlle Bekkering
- Dirk Bellemakers
- Chantal Beltman
- Henk Benjamins
- Eddy Beugels
- Guus Bierings
- Frits van Bindsbergen
- Chantal Blaak
- Theo Blankenauw
- Cor Blekemolen
- Jeroen Blijlevens
- Coen Boerman
- Henk Boeve
- John Bogers
- Jetse Bol
- Léon van Bon
- Michael Boogerd
- Lars Boom
- Jan Bos
- Marco Bos
- Theo Bos
- Gerard Bosch van Drakestein
- Eddy Bouwmans
- Jan Boven
- Janus Braspennincx
- John Braspennincx
- Hein van Breenen
- Bart Brentjens
- Erik Breukink
- Jan Brinkman
- Johnny Broers
- Petra de Bruin
- Brian Bulgac

== C ==
- Stef Clement
- Mathieu Cordang
- Tom Cordes
- Michel Cornelisse
- Roy Curvers

== D ==
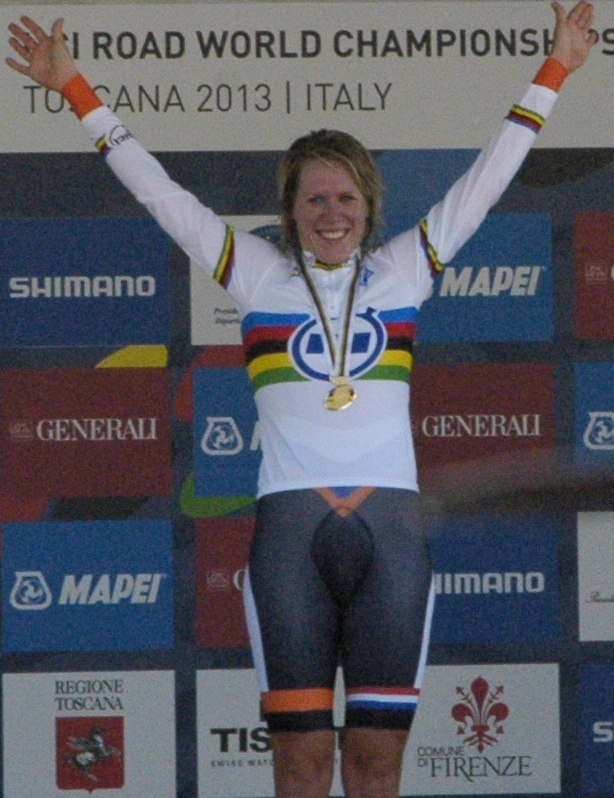
Ellen van Dijk, 4× world champion. Pictured: time trial world champion in 2013.

- Hans Daams
- Laurens ten Dam
- Piet Damen
- Erik Dekker
- Thomas Dekker
- Hans Dekkers (1928)
- Jan Derksen
- Piet Dickentman
- Daan van Dijk
- Ellen van Dijk, 4× world champion
- Stefan van Dijk
- Herbert Dijkstra
- Evert Dolman
- Jef Dominicus
- Leo van Dongen
- Johannes Draaijer
- Maarten Ducrot
- Tom Dumoulin
- Huub Duyn
- Leo Duyndam

== E ==
- Jaap Eden
- Jacques van Egmond
- Michiel Elijzen
- Theo Eltink
- Jos van Emden
- Addy Engels
- Dick Enthoven
- Cees van Espen
- Nico van Est
- Piet van Est
- Wim van Est

== F ==
- Henk Faanhof
- Rick Flens

== G ==
- Ab Geldermans
- Mees Gerritsen
- Robert Gesink
- André Gevers
- Bas Giling
- Suzanne de Goede
- Floris Goesinnen
- Tiemen Groen
- Richard Groenendaal
- Bram de Groot
- Daan de Groot
- Loes Gunnewijk

== H ==
- Jo de Haan
- Piet Haan
- Cees Haast
- Jacques Hanegraaf
- Ingrid Haringa
- Jan Harings
- Ger Harings
- Huub Harings
- Rob Harmeling
- Arie den Hartog
- Max van Heeswijk
- Piet van Heusden
- Mathieu Heijboer
- Levi Heimans
- Janus Hellemons
- Mathieu Hermans
- Fedor den Hertog
- Yvonne Hijgenaar
- Aad van den Hoek
- Tristan Hoffman
- Reinier Honig
- Henk de Hoog
- Johnny Hoogerland
- Adri van Houwelingen
- Arie van Houwelingen
- Jan van Houwelingen
- Jan Hugens
- Jenning Huizenga
- Kenny van Hummel

== I ==
- Piet Ikelaar

== J ==
- Gert Jakobs
- Ben Janbroers
- Harm Jansen
- Harrie Jansen
- Jan Jansen
- Jan Janssen
- Sjefke Janssen
- Piet de Jongh
- Steven de Jongh
- Patrick Jonker

== K ==
- Willy Kanis
- Gerben Karstens
- Alain van Katwijk
- Fons van Katwijk
- Jan van Katwijk
- Piet van Katwijk
- Martijn Keizer
- Wilco Kelderman
- Wim Kelleners
- Rudie Kemna
- Jaap Kersten
- Moniek Kleinsman
- Rigard van Klooster
- Servais Knaven
- Gerben de Knegt
- Gerrie Knetemann
- Monique Knol
- Cees Koeken
- Gerard Koel
- Jans Koerts
- Ben Koken
- Martin Kokkelkoren
- Louis de Koning
- Koen de Kort
- André de Korver
- Michel Kreder
- Raymond Kreder
- Jan Krekels
- Karsten Kroon
- Steven Kruijswijk
- Hennie Kuiper

== L ==
- Jef Lahaye
- Jan Lambrichs
- Jos Lammertink
- Johan Lammerts
- Sebastian Langeveld
- Bernard Leene
- Tom Leezer
- Michel Legrand
- Joost van Leijen
- Rudie Liebrechts
- Pim Ligthart
- Elis Ligtlee
- Bert-Jan Lindeman
- Leijn Loevesijn
- Marc Lotz
- René Lotz
- Gerben Löwik
- Henk Lubberding
- Cees Lute

== M ==
- Marc de Maar
- Jo Maas
- Martijn Maaskant
- Frans Maassen
- Frans Mahn
- Bas Maliepaard
- Henri Manders
- Barry Markus
- Antoine Mazairac
- Jacques van Meer
- Jaap Meijer
- Raymond Meijs
- Mirjam Melchers
- Theofiel (Theo) Middelkamp
- Gaby Minneboo
- Koos Moerenhout
- Piet Moeskops
- Wouter Mol
- Bauke Mollema
- Leontien van Moorsel
- Jens Mouris
- Teun Mulder
- Rob Mulders
- Ronald Mutsaars

== N ==
- Piet van Nek
- Danny Nelissen
- Coen Niesten
- Heddie Nieuwdorp
- Erwin Nijboer
- Henk Nijdam
- Jelle Nijdam
- Jan Nolten

== O ==
- Keetie van Oosten-Hage
- Bert Oosterbosch
- Marc van Orsouw
- Harm Ottenbros
- Jaap Oudkerk
- Daniëlle Overgaag

== P ==
- Leo Peelen
- Maurice Peeters
- Kees Pellenaars
- Gerard Peters
- Peter Pieters
- Jan Pieterse
- René Pijnen
- Jan Pijnenburg
- Frits Pirard
- Leo van der Pluym
- Adri van der Poel
- Twan Poels
- Wout Poels
- Herman Ponsteen
- Boy van Poppel
- Jean-Paul van Poppel
- Peter Post
- Joost Posthuma
- Cees Priem
- Henk Prinsen
- Wim Prinsen
- Bert Pronk
- Jos Pronk
- Matthé Pronk
- Mattheus Pronk
- Mathieu Pustjens

== R ==
- Jan Raas
- Rik Reinerink
- Cees Rentmeester
- Piet Rentmeester
- Kai Reus
- Thijs Roks
- Fred Rompelberg
- Jo de Roo
- Piet Rooijakkers
- Steven Rooks
- Theo de Rooij
- Gerrit Van De Ruit
- Wim de Ruyter

== S ==
- Paul van Schalen
- Martin Schalkers
- Bouk Schellingerhoudt
- Albert van Schendel
- Antoon van Schendel
- Peter Schep
- Wim Schepers
- Niels Scheuneman
- Jos Schipper
- Bram Schmitz
- Jan Schröder
- Roy Schuiten
- Gerrit Schulte
- Eddy Schurer
- Jan Serpenti
- Jan Siemons
- Huub Sijen
- Tom-Jelte Slagter
- Robert Slippens
- Theo Smit
- Gerrit Solleveld
- Cees Stam
- Danny Stam
- Hennie Stamsnijder
- Tom Stamsnijder
- Antoon van der Steen
- Peter Stevenhaagen
- Harrie Steevens
- Michel (Mies) Stolker
- Jeroen Straathof
- Wim Stroetinga
- Adri Suykerbuyk
- Luc Suykerbuyk

== T ==
- Tino Tabak
- John Talen
- Bram Tankink
- Niki Terpstra
- Gert-Jan Theunisse
- Albert Timmer
- Maarten Tjallingii
- Patrick Tolhoek
- Bobbie Traksel

== V ==
- Marinus Valentijn
- Tom Veelers
- Wiebren Veenstra
- Johan van der Velde
- Gerard Veldscholten
- Tim Veldt
- Thorwald Veneberg
- Martin Venix
- Nico Verhoeven
- Coen Vermeltfoort
- Marco Vermey
- Martijn Verschoor
- Gerard Vianen
- Aart Vierhouten
- Adrie Visser
- Jos van der Vleuten
- Arie van Vliet
- Leo van Vliet
- Teun van Vliet
- Adri Voorting
- Gerrit Voorting
- Marianne Vos
- Wim de Vos
- Bart Voskamp
- Gerrit de Vries

== W ==
- Rini Wagtmans
- Wout Wagtmans
- Arno Wallaard
- Pieter Weening
- Lieuwe Westra
- Remmert Wielinga
- Ad Wijnands
- Ko Willems
- Dennis van Winden
- Peter Winnen
- Wouter Wippert
- Piet de Wit

== Z ==
- Michel Zanoli
- Peter Zijerveld
- Leontien Zijlaard-van Moorsel
- Huub Zilverberg
- Bart Zoet
- Joop Zoetemelk
- Thijs Zonneveld
- Cees Zoontjens
- Wilco Zuijderwijk

== See also ==
- List of Dutch Olympic cyclists
- Category:Dutch cyclists
- List of British cyclists
