= De Kova–Lejeune =

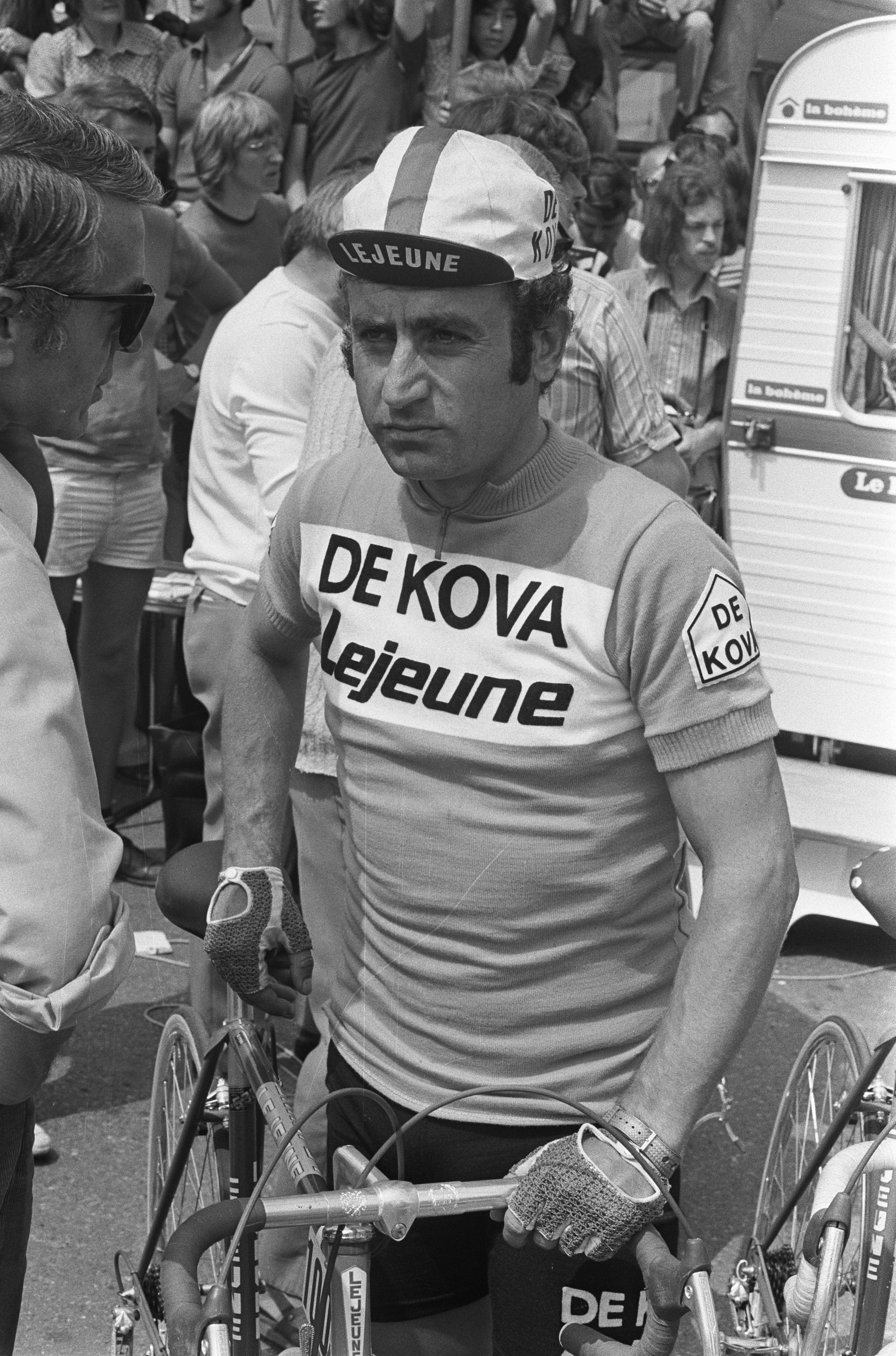
- Lucien Aimar at the 1973 Tour de France

Team information
- Registered: France
- Founded: 1973
- Disbanded: 1973
- Discipline: Road
- Bicycles: Cycles Lejeune

Key personnel
- General manager: Edouard Achleitner; Raphaël Géminiani; Guy Lapébie

Team name history
- 1973: De Kova–Lejeune

De Kova–Lejeune was a French professional cycling team that existed in 1973. It was sponsored by the wealthy Miriam De Kova and Cycles Lejeune. Included in the roster was 1966 Tour de France winner Lucien Aimar. The team wore pink jerseys.

== Team roster ==
The following is a list of riders on the De Kova–Lejeune squad during the 1973 season, with age given for 1 January 1973.

Rider	Date of birth
Lucien Aimar (FRA)	28 April 1941 (aged 31)
Jean-Claude Baud (FRA)	14 February 1948 (aged 24)
Firmino Bernardino (POR)	19 March 1950 (aged 22)
Christian Blain (FRA)	31 July 1948 (aged 24)
Jean-Claude Blocher (FRA)	6 January 1949 (aged 23)
Marcel Boishardy (FRA)	7 March 1945 (aged 27)
Joseph Carletti (FRA)	12 March 1946 (aged 26)
Jean Claude Dubost (FRA)	3 August 1949 (aged 23)
Andrés Gandarias (ESP)	24 April 1943 (aged 29)
Noël Geneste (FRA)	17 December 1947 (aged 25)

Rider	Date of birth
Charles Genthon (FRA)	27 May 1945 (aged 27)
Gérard Godier (FRA)	19 June 1950 (aged 22)
Jacques-André Hochart (FRA)	29 July 1948 (aged 24)
Serge Lapébie (FRA)	9 June 1948 (aged 24)
Gerard Olbe (FRA)	4 February 1948 (aged 24)
Richard Podesta (FRA)	1 March 1948 (aged 24)
Cees van der Meijden (NED)	5 January 1951 (aged 21)
Gregoire Van Moer (BEL)	26 July 1947 (aged 25)
Daniel Vermeulen (FRA)	14 April 1948 (aged 24)
