= 1972 Vuelta a España, Prologue to Stage 8 =

Cycling race stages

The 1972 Vuelta a España was the 32nd edition of the Vuelta a España, one of cycling's Grand Tours. The Vuelta began in Fuengirola, with a prologue individual time trial on 27 April, and Stage 8 occurred on 5 May with a stage to Tarragona. The race finished in San Sebastián on 14 May.

== Prologue ==
27 April 1972 - Fuengirola to Fuengirola, 6 km (3.7 mi) (ITT)

Prologue result and general classification after Prologue

Rank	Rider	Team	Time
1	René Pijnen (NED)	Bic	7' 35"
2	José Antonio González (ESP)	Kas–Kaskol	+ 2"
3	Joaquim Agostinho (POR)	Van Cauter–Magniflex–de Gribaldy	+ 10"
4	Jesús Manzaneque (ESP)	Kas–Kaskol	+ 11"
5	Leif Mortensen (DEN)	Bic	+ 15"
6	José Pesarrodona (ESP)	Kas–Kaskol	s.t.
7	Bernard Labourdette (FRA)	Bic	+ 17"
8	Miguel María Lasa (ESP)	Kas–Kaskol	s.t.
9	Gerard Vianen (NED)	Goudsmit–Hoff	s.t.
10	Francisco Galdós (ESP)	Kas–Kaskol	+ 18"

== Stage 1 ==
28 April 1972 - Fuengirola to Cabra, 167 km (103.8 mi)

Route:

Stage 1 result

Rank	Rider	Team	Time
1	Miguel María Lasa (ESP)	Kas–Kaskol	4h 36' 12"
2	Domingo Perurena (ESP)	Kas–Kaskol	+ 10"
3	Gonzalo Aja (ESP)	Karpy	+ 16"
4	José Luis Uribezubia (ESP)	Werner	+ 20"
5	Joaquim Agostinho (POR)	Van Cauter–Magniflex–de Gribaldy	s.t.
6	José Gómez (ESP)	Werner	s.t.
7	Santiago Lazcano (ESP)	Kas–Kaskol	s.t.
8	Juan Zurano (ESP)	La Casera–Peña Bahamontes	s.t.
9	Désiré Letort (FRA)	Bic	s.t.
10	José Luis Abilleira (ESP)	La Casera–Peña Bahamontes	s.t.

General classification after Stage 1

Rank	Rider	Team	Time
1	Miguel María Lasa (ESP)	Kas–Kaskol	4h 44' 04"
2	José Antonio González (ESP)	Kas–Kaskol	+ 5"
3	Joaquim Agostinho (POR)	Van Cauter–Magniflex–de Gribaldy	+ 8"
4	Jesús Manzaneque (ESP)	Kas–Kaskol	+ 14"
5	José Pesarrodona (ESP)	Kas–Kaskol	+ 18"
6	Leif Mortensen (DEN)	Bic	s.t.
7	Bernard Labourdette (FRA)	Bic	+ 20"
8	Francisco Galdós (ESP)	Kas–Kaskol	+ 21"
9	Désiré Letort (FRA)	Bic	+ 22"
10	Gonzalo Aja (ESP)	Karpy	+ 23"

== Stage 2 ==
29 April 1972 - Cabra to Granada, 206 km (128.0 mi)

Route:

Stage 2 result

Rank	Rider	Team	Time
1	Gerard Vianen (NED)	Goudsmit–Hoff	5h 33' 25"
2	Domingo Perurena (ESP)	Kas–Kaskol	+ 17"
3	Claudio Michelotto (ITA)	G.B.C.–Sony	+ 23"
4	Francisco Galdós (ESP)	Kas–Kaskol	+ 28"
5	Diego Moser (ITA)	G.B.C.–Sony	s.t.
6	Hubert Hutsebaut (BEL)	Goldor–IJsboerke	s.t.
7	Bernard Labourdette (FRA)	Bic	s.t.
8	Rik Van Linden (BEL)	Van Cauter–Magniflex–de Gribaldy	s.t.
9	Walter Planckaert (BEL)	Watney–Avia	+ 36"
10	Ger Harings (NED)	Goudsmit–Hoff	s.t.

General classification after Stage 2

Rank	Rider	Team	Time
1	Miguel María Lasa (ESP)	Kas–Kaskol	10h 18' 05"
2	Domingo Perurena (ESP)	Kas–Kaskol	+ 5"
3	José Antonio González (ESP)	Kas–Kaskol	s.t.
4	Joaquim Agostinho (POR)	Van Cauter–Magniflex–de Gribaldy	+ 8"
5	Bernard Labourdette (FRA)	Bic	+ 11"
6	Francisco Galdós (ESP)	Kas–Kaskol	+ 12"
7	Jesús Manzaneque (ESP)	Kas–Kaskol	+ 14"
8	José Pesarrodona (ESP)	Kas–Kaskol	s.t.
9	Leif Mortensen (DEN)	Bic	+ 18"
10	Désiré Letort (FRA)	Bic	+ 22"

== Stage 3 ==
30 April 1972 - Granada to Almería, 181 km (112 mi)

Route:

Stage 3 result

Rank	Rider	Team	Time
1	Domingo Perurena (ESP)	Kas–Kaskol	4h 30' 46"
2	José Gómez (ESP)	Werner	+ 10"
3	Rik Van Linden (BEL)	Van Cauter–Magniflex–de Gribaldy	+ 16"
4	Pieter Nassen (BEL)	Watney–Avia	+ 20"
5	Walter Planckaert (BEL)	Watney–Avia	s.t.
6	Dino Zandegù (ITA)	G.B.C.–Sony	s.t.
7	Ger Harings (NED)	Goudsmit–Hoff	s.t.
8	Emile Cambré (BEL)	Goldor–IJsboerke	s.t.
9	Miguel María Lasa (ESP)	Kas–Kaskol	s.t.
10	Johny Schleck (LUX)	Bic	s.t.

General classification after Stage 3

Rank	Rider	Team	Time
1	Domingo Perurena (ESP)	Kas–Kaskol	14h 48' 56"
2	Miguel María Lasa (ESP)	Kas–Kaskol	+ 15"
3	José Antonio González (ESP)	Kas–Kaskol	+ 20"
4	Joaquim Agostinho (POR)	Van Cauter–Magniflex–de Gribaldy	+ 23"
5	Bernard Labourdette (FRA)	Bic	+ 26"
6	Francisco Galdós (ESP)	Kas–Kaskol	+ 27"
7	Jesús Manzaneque (ESP)	Kas–Kaskol	+ 29"
8	José Pesarrodona (ESP)	Kas–Kaskol	s.t.
9	Leif Mortensen (DEN)	Bic	+ 33"
10	Désiré Letort (FRA)	Bic	+ 37"

== Stage 4 ==
1 May 1972 - Almería to Dehesa de Campoamor, 251 km (156 mi)

Route:

Stage 4 result

Rank	Rider	Team	Time
1	Ger Harings (NED)	Goudsmit–Hoff	6h 41' 37"
2	Walter Planckaert (BEL)	Watney–Avia	+ 10"
3	Antonio Gómez del Moral (ESP)	Karpy	+ 16"
4	Gerard Vianen (NED)	Goudsmit–Hoff	+ 47"
5	Hubert Hutsebaut (BEL)	Goldor–IJsboerke	+ 51"
6	René Pijnen (NED)	Bic	+ 56"
7	Domingo Perurena (ESP)	Kas–Kaskol	+ 1' 18"
8	Daniel Ducreux (FRA)	Bic	1' 20"
9	Cees Koeken (NED)	Goudsmit–Hoff	s.t.
10	Marcel Omloop (BEL)	Watney–Avia	s.t.

== Stage 5 ==
2 May 1972 - Dehesa de Campoamor to Gandia, 183 km (114 mi)

Route:

Stage 5 result

Rank	Rider	Team	Time
1	Pieter Nassen (BEL)	Watney–Avia	4h 58' 24"
2	Domingo Perurena (ESP)	Kas–Kaskol	+ 10"
3	Dino Zandegù (ITA)	G.B.C.–Sony	+ 16"
4	Ger Harings (NED)	Goudsmit–Hoff	+ 20"
5	Walter Planckaert (BEL)	Watney–Avia	s.t.
6	Daniel Ducreux (FRA)	Bic	s.t.
7	Alfons Scheys (BEL)	Goldor–IJsboerke	s.t.
8	Willy Planckaert (BEL)	Goldor–IJsboerke	s.t.
9	José Gómez (ESP)	Werner	s.t.
10	José Manuel López (ESP)	Werner	s.t.

General classification after Stage 5

Rank	Rider	Team	Time
1	Domingo Perurena (ESP)	Kas–Kaskol	26h 30' 05"
2	José Antonio González (ESP)	Kas–Kaskol	+ 32"
3	Bernard Labourdette (FRA)	Bic	+ 38"
4	Francisco Galdós (ESP)	Kas–Kaskol	+ 39"
5	Jesús Manzaneque (ESP)	Kas–Kaskol	+ 41"
6	José Pesarrodona (ESP)	Kas–Kaskol	s.t.
7	Leif Mortensen (DEN)	Bic	+ 45"
8	Gonzalo Aja (ESP)	Karpy	s.t.
9	Miguel María Lasa (ESP)	Kas–Kaskol	+ 46"
10	Désiré Letort (FRA)	Bic	+ 49"

== Stage 6a ==
3 May 1972 - Gandia to El Saler, 120 km (75 mi)

Route:

Stage 6a result

Rank	Rider	Team	Time
1	Roger Kindt (BEL)	Van Cauter–Magniflex–de Gribaldy	2h 59' 17"
2	Claudio Michelotto (ITA)	G.B.C.–Sony	+ 10"
3	Jos van der Vleuten (NED)	Goudsmit–Hoff	+ 16"
4	José Grande Sánchez (ESP)	Werner	+ 20"
5	Emile Cambré (BEL)	Goldor–IJsboerke	s.t.
6	José Luis Abilleira (ESP)	La Casera–Peña Bahamontes	+ 1' 07"
7	Ger Harings (NED)	Goudsmit–Hoff	s.t.
8	Willy Planckaert (BEL)	Goldor–IJsboerke	s.t.
9	Karel Delnoy (NED)	Goudsmit–Hoff	s.t.
10	Wim Prinsen (NED)	Goudsmit–Hoff	s.t.

== Stage 6b ==
3 May 1972 - El Saler to El Saler, 6.5 km (4.0 mi) (TTT)

Stage 6b result

Rank	Rider	Team	Time
1	Kas–Kaskol	8' 08"	
2	Bic	+ 8"	
3	Goudsmit–Hoff	+ 11"	
4	Watney–Avia	+ 16"	
5	Werner	+ 17"	
6	La Casera–Peña Bahamontes	+ 24"	
7	Karpy	+ 32"	
8	Van Cauter–Magniflex–de Gribaldy	+ 34"	
9	G.B.C.–Sony	+ 48"	
10	Goldor–IJsboerke	+ 59"	

General classification after Stage 6b

Rank	Rider	Team	Time
1	Domingo Perurena (ESP)	Kas–Kaskol	29h 30' 29"
2	José Antonio González (ESP)	Kas–Kaskol	+ 32"
3	Bernard Labourdette (FRA)	Bic	+ 33"
4	Francisco Galdós (ESP)	Kas–Kaskol	+ 39"
5	Jesús Manzaneque (ESP)	Kas–Kaskol	+ 41"
6	Miguel María Lasa (ESP)	Kas–Kaskol	s.t.
7	José Pesarrodona (ESP)	Kas–Kaskol	s.t.
8	Leif Mortensen (DEN)	Bic	+ 45"
9	Gonzalo Aja (ESP)	Karpy	s.t.
10	Désiré Letort (FRA)	Bic	+ 49"

== Stage 7 ==
4 May 1972 - Valencia to Vinaròs, 181 km (112 mi)

Route:

Stage 7 result

Rank	Rider	Team	Time
1	Jos van der Vleuten (NED)	Goudsmit–Hoff	4h 12' 49"
2	Domingo Perurena (ESP)	Kas–Kaskol	+ 11"
3	Gerard Vianen (NED)	Goudsmit–Hoff	+ 17"
4	Pieter Nassen (BEL)	Watney–Avia	+ 21"
5	Miguel María Lasa (ESP)	Kas–Kaskol	s.t.
6	José Luis Abilleira (ESP)	La Casera–Peña Bahamontes	s.t.
7	Manuel Blanco Garea (ESP)	Werner	s.t.
8	Julián Cuevas González (ESP)	Karpy	s.t.
9	Leif Mortensen (DEN)	Bic	s.t.
10	Andrés Oliva (ESP)	La Casera–Peña Bahamontes	s.t.

General classification after Stage 7

Rank	Rider	Team	Time
1	Domingo Perurena (ESP)	Kas–Kaskol	33h 43' 29"
2	Bernard Labourdette (FRA)	Bic	+ 41"
3	José Antonio González (ESP)	Kas–Kaskol	+ 42"
4	Jesús Manzaneque (ESP)	Kas–Kaskol	+ 51"
5	José Pesarrodona (ESP)	Kas–Kaskol	s.t.
6	Miguel María Lasa (ESP)	Kas–Kaskol	s.t.
7	Leif Mortensen (DEN)	Bic	+ 55"
8	Gonzalo Aja (ESP)	Karpy	s.t.
9	Désiré Letort (FRA)	Bic	+ 59"
10	José Luis Abilleira (ESP)	La Casera–Peña Bahamontes	+ 1' 01"

== Stage 8 ==
5 May 1972 - Vinaròs to Tarragona, 189 km (117 mi)

Route:

Stage 8 result

Rank	Rider	Team	Time
1	Cees Koeken (NED)	Goudsmit–Hoff	5h 00' 31"
2	Domingo Perurena (ESP)	Kas–Kaskol	+ 10"
3	Ger Harings (NED)	Goudsmit–Hoff	+ 16"
4	Pieter Nassen (BEL)	Watney–Avia	+ 20"
5	Walter Planckaert (BEL)	Watney–Avia	s.t.
6	José Manuel López (ESP)	Werner	s.t.
7	Alfons Scheys (BEL)	Goldor–IJsboerke	s.t.
8	Jan Krekels (NED)	Goudsmit–Hoff	s.t.
9	Gerard Vianen (NED)	Goudsmit–Hoff	s.t.
10	Willy Planckaert (BEL)	Goldor–IJsboerke	s.t.

General classification after Stage 8

Rank	Rider	Team	Time
1	Domingo Perurena (ESP)	Kas–Kaskol	38h 44' 10"
2	Bernard Labourdette (FRA)	Bic	+ 51"
3	José Antonio González (ESP)	Kas–Kaskol	+ 52"
4	Jesús Manzaneque (ESP)	Kas–Kaskol	+ 1' 01"
5	José Pesarrodona (ESP)	Kas–Kaskol	s.t.
6	Miguel María Lasa (ESP)	Kas–Kaskol	s.t.
7	Leif Mortensen (DEN)	Bic	+ 1' 05"
8	Gonzalo Aja (ESP)	Karpy	s.t.
9	Désiré Letort (FRA)	Bic	+ 1' 09"
10	José Luis Abilleira (ESP)	La Casera–Peña Bahamontes	+ 1' 11"
