= 1972 Vuelta a España, Stage 9a to Stage 17b =

Cycling race stages

The 1972 Vuelta a España was the 32nd edition of the Vuelta a España, one of cycling's Grand Tours. The Vuelta began in Fuengirola, with a prologue individual time trial on 27 April, and Stage 9a occurred on 6 May with a stage from Tarragona. The race finished in San Sebastián on 14 May.

== Stage 9a ==
6 May 1972 - Tarragona to Barcelona, 118 km (73.3 mi)

Route:

Stage 9a result

Rank	Rider	Team	Time
1	Ger Harings (NED)	Goudsmit–Hoff	2h 45' 06"
2	Domingo Perurena (ESP)	Kas–Kaskol	+ 8"
3	Dino Zandegù (ITA)	G.B.C.–Sony	+ 12"
4	Willy Planckaert (BEL)	Goldor–IJsboerke	s.t.
5	Pieter Nassen (BEL)	Watney–Avia	s.t.
6	Agustín Tamames (ESP)	Werner	s.t.
7	José Luis Abilleira (ESP)	La Casera–Peña Bahamontes	s.t.
8	Gerard Vianen (NED)	Goudsmit–Hoff	s.t.
9	Wim Prinsen (NED)	Goudsmit–Hoff	s.t.
10	Jan van Katwijk (NED)	Goudsmit–Hoff	s.t.

== Stage 9b ==
6 May 1972 - Barcelona to Barcelona, 10 km (6.2 mi) (ITT)

Stage 9b result

Rank	Rider	Team	Time
1	Jesús Manzaneque (ESP)	Kas–Kaskol	13' 51"
2	Miguel María Lasa (ESP)	Kas–Kaskol	+ 7"
3	José Antonio González (ESP)	Kas–Kaskol	+ 10"
4	Agustín Tamames (ESP)	Werner	+ 15"
5	Leif Mortensen (DEN)	Bic	+ 17"
6	José Pesarrodona (ESP)	Kas–Kaskol	+ 19"
7	Gonzalo Aja (ESP)	Karpy	+ 20"
8	Domingo Perurena (ESP)	Kas–Kaskol	+ 22"
9	Vicente López Carril (ESP)	Kas–Kaskol	s.t.
10	Michel Coulon (BEL)	Watney–Avia	+ 24"

General classification after Stage 9b

Rank	Rider	Team	Time
1	Domingo Perurena (ESP)	Kas–Kaskol	41h 43' 37"
2	Jesús Manzaneque (ESP)	Kas–Kaskol	+ 46"
3	José Antonio González (ESP)	Kas–Kaskol	+ 47"
4	Miguel María Lasa (ESP)	Kas–Kaskol	+ 53"
5	Bernard Labourdette (FRA)	Bic	+ 1' 00"
6	Leif Mortensen (DEN)	Bic	+ 1' 02"
7	José Pesarrodona (ESP)	Kas–Kaskol	+ 1' 05"
8	Gonzalo Aja (ESP)	Karpy	+ 1' 10"
9	Désiré Letort (FRA)	Bic	+ 1' 18"
10	Agustín Tamames (ESP)	Werner	+ 1' 28"

== Stage 10 ==
7 May 1972 - Barcelona to Banyoles, 192 km (119.3 mi)

Route:

Stage 10 result

Rank	Rider	Team	Time
1	Domingo Perurena (ESP)	Kas–Kaskol	5h 12' 46"
2	Julián Cuevas González (ESP)	Karpy	+ 10"
3	Juan Zurano (ESP)	La Casera–Peña Bahamontes	+ 16"
4	Miguel María Lasa (ESP)	Kas–Kaskol	+ 20"
5	Leif Mortensen (DEN)	Bic	s.t.
6	Jos van der Vleuten (NED)	Goudsmit–Hoff	s.t.
7	Andrés Oliva (ESP)	La Casera–Peña Bahamontes	s.t.
8	José Luis Abilleira (ESP)	La Casera–Peña Bahamontes	s.t.
9	Johny Schleck (LUX)	Bic	s.t.
10	José Manuel López (ESP)	Werner	s.t.

General classification after Stage 10

Rank	Rider	Team	Time
1	Domingo Perurena (ESP)	Kas–Kaskol	46h 56' 15"
2	Miguel María Lasa (ESP)	Kas–Kaskol	+ 1' 08"
3	Jesús Manzaneque (ESP)	Kas–Kaskol	+ 1' 14"
4	José Antonio González (ESP)	Kas–Kaskol	+ 1' 15"
5	Bernard Labourdette (FRA)	Bic	+ 1' 28"
6	Leif Mortensen (DEN)	Bic	+ 1' 30"
7	José Pesarrodona (ESP)	Kas–Kaskol	+ 1' 33"
8	Gonzalo Aja (ESP)	Karpy	+ 1' 38"
9	Désiré Letort (FRA)	Bic	+ 1' 46"
10	Agustín Tamames (ESP)	Werner	+ 1' 56"

== Stage 11 ==
8 May 1972 - Manresa to Zaragoza, 259 km (160.9 mi)

Route:

Stage 11 result

Rank	Rider	Team	Time
1	Luis Balagué (ESP)	Werner	6h 47' 14"
2	Cees Koeken (NED)	Goudsmit–Hoff	+ 9' 42"
3	Pieter Nassen (BEL)	Watney–Avia	+ 9' 48"
4	Julián Cuevas González (ESP)	Karpy	+ 9' 52"
5	Jan van Katwijk (NED)	Goudsmit–Hoff	s.t.
6	Walter Planckaert (BEL)	Watney–Avia	s.t.
7	Juan Zurano (ESP)	La Casera–Peña Bahamontes	s.t.
8	Willy Planckaert (BEL)	Goldor–IJsboerke	s.t.
9	Alfons Scheys (BEL)	Goldor–IJsboerke	s.t.
10	Jan Krekels (NED)	Goudsmit–Hoff	s.t.

== Stage 12 ==
9 May 1972 - Zaragoza to Formigal, 169 km (105.0 mi)

Route:

Stage 12 result

Rank	Rider	Team	Time
1	José Manuel Fuente (ESP)	Kas–Kaskol	4h 36' 24"
2	Antonio Menéndez (ESP)	Karpy	+ 6' 37"
3	Santiago Lazcano (ESP)	Kas–Kaskol	+ 7' 02"
4	Juan Zurano (ESP)	La Casera–Peña Bahamontes	+ 8' 00"
5	Manuel Blanco Garea (ESP)	Werner	+ 8' 13"
6	Johny Schleck (LUX)	Bic	+ 8' 31"
7	Domingo Perurena (ESP)	Kas–Kaskol	+ 8' 37"
8	Bernard Labourdette (FRA)	Bic	s.t.
9	Miguel María Lasa (ESP)	Kas–Kaskol	s.t.
10	Agustín Tamames (ESP)	Werner	s.t.

General classification after Stage 12

Rank	Rider	Team	Time
1	José Manuel Fuente (ESP)	Kas–Kaskol	58h 31' 47"
2	Domingo Perurena (ESP)	Kas–Kaskol	+ 6' 35"
3	Miguel María Lasa (ESP)	Kas–Kaskol	+ 7' 43"
4	Jesús Manzaneque (ESP)	Kas–Kaskol	+ 7' 55"
5	José Antonio González (ESP)	Kas–Kaskol	+ 7' 56"
6	Bernard Labourdette (FRA)	Bic	+ 8' 03"
7	Santiago Lazcano (ESP)	Kas–Kaskol	s.t.
8	Leif Mortensen (DEN)	Bic	+ 8' 11"
9	José Pesarrodona (ESP)	Kas–Kaskol	+ 8' 14"
10	Désiré Letort (FRA)	Bic	+ 8' 27"

== Stage 13 ==
10 May 1972 - Sangüesa to Arrate, 201 km (125 mi)

Route:

Stage 13 result

Rank	Rider	Team	Time
1	Agustín Tamames (ESP)	Werner	6h 07' 07"
2	José Manuel Fuente (ESP)	Kas–Kaskol	+ 11"
3	Gonzalo Aja (ESP)	Karpy	+ 25"
4	Désiré Letort (FRA)	Bic	+ 29"
5	Miguel María Lasa (ESP)	Kas–Kaskol	s.t.
6	Andrés Oliva (ESP)	La Casera–Peña Bahamontes	+ 56"
7	Francisco Galdós (ESP)	Kas–Kaskol	s.t.
8	José Pesarrodona (ESP)	Kas–Kaskol	s.t.
9	Jesús Manzaneque (ESP)	Kas–Kaskol	s.t.
10	José Antonio Pontón Ruiz (ESP)	Werner	s.t.

General classification after Stage 13

Rank	Rider	Team	Time
1	José Manuel Fuente (ESP)	Kas–Kaskol	64h 39' 13"
2	Miguel María Lasa (ESP)	Kas–Kaskol	+ 7' 48"
3	Agustín Tamames (ESP)	Werner	+ 8' 12"
4	Jesús Manzaneque (ESP)	Kas–Kaskol	+ 8' 33"
5	Désiré Letort (FRA)	Bic	+ 8' 37"
6	Gonzalo Aja (ESP)	Karpy	+ 8' 40"
7	Bernard Labourdette (FRA)	Bic	+ 8' 41"
8	Domingo Perurena (ESP)	Kas–Kaskol	+ 8' 50"
9	José Pesarrodona (ESP)	Kas–Kaskol	+ 8' 52"
10	José Antonio González (ESP)	Kas–Kaskol	+ 9' 07"

== Stage 14 ==
11 May 1972 - Eibar to Bilbao, 145 km (90 mi)

Route:

Stage 14 result

Rank	Rider	Team	Time
1	Miguel María Lasa (ESP)	Kas–Kaskol	3h 47' 07"
2	Agustín Tamames (ESP)	Werner	+ 10"
3	Domingo Perurena (ESP)	Kas–Kaskol	+ 16"
4	Andrés Oliva (ESP)	La Casera–Peña Bahamontes	+ 20"
5	Willy Planckaert (BEL)	Goldor–IJsboerke	s.t.
6	Jan Krekels (NED)	Goudsmit–Hoff	s.t.
7	José Luis Abilleira (ESP)	La Casera–Peña Bahamontes	s.t.
8	Gerard Vianen (NED)	Goudsmit–Hoff	s.t.
9	Sigfrido Fontanelli (ITA)	Van Cauter–Magniflex–de Gribaldy	s.t.
10	Luis Santamarina (ESP)	Werner	s.t.

General classification after Stage 14

Rank	Rider	Team	Time
1	José Manuel Fuente (ESP)	Kas–Kaskol	68h 26' 40"
2	Miguel María Lasa (ESP)	Kas–Kaskol	+ 7' 18"
3	Agustín Tamames (ESP)	Werner	+ 8' 02"
4	Jesús Manzaneque (ESP)	Kas–Kaskol	+ 8' 33"
5	Désiré Letort (FRA)	Bic	+ 8' 37"
6	Gonzalo Aja (ESP)	Karpy	+ 8' 40"
7	Domingo Perurena (ESP)	Kas–Kaskol	+ 8' 41"
8	Bernard Labourdette (FRA)	Bic	s.t.
9	José Pesarrodona (ESP)	Kas–Kaskol	+ 8' 52"
10	José Antonio González (ESP)	Kas–Kaskol	+ 9' 07"

== Stage 15 ==
12 May 1972 - Bilbao to Torrelavega, 148 km (92 mi)

Route:

Stage 15 result

Rank	Rider	Team	Time
1	Gerard Vianen (NED)	Goudsmit–Hoff	4h 08' 53"
2	Pieter Nassen (BEL)	Watney–Avia	+ 10"
3	Agustín Tamames (ESP)	Werner	+ 16"
4	Willy Planckaert (BEL)	Goldor–IJsboerke	+ 20"
5	Ger Harings (NED)	Goudsmit–Hoff	s.t.
6	Jan van Katwijk (NED)	Goudsmit–Hoff	s.t.
7	Jan Krekels (NED)	Goudsmit–Hoff	s.t.
8	Félix González (ESP)	La Casera–Peña Bahamontes	s.t.
9	Walter Planckaert (BEL)	Watney–Avia	s.t.
10	Alfons Scheys (BEL)	Goldor–IJsboerke	s.t.

General classification after Stage 15

Rank	Rider	Team	Time
1	José Manuel Fuente (ESP)	Kas–Kaskol	72h 35' 53"
2	Miguel María Lasa (ESP)	Kas–Kaskol	+ 7' 18"
3	Agustín Tamames (ESP)	Werner	+ 7' 58"
4	Domingo Perurena (ESP)	Kas–Kaskol	+ 8' 32"
5	Jesús Manzaneque (ESP)	Kas–Kaskol	+ 8' 33"
6	Désiré Letort (FRA)	Bic	+ 8' 37"
7	Gonzalo Aja (ESP)	Karpy	+ 8' 40"
8	Bernard Labourdette (FRA)	Bic	+ 8' 41"
9	José Pesarrodona (ESP)	Kas–Kaskol	+ 8' 52"
10	José Antonio González (ESP)	Kas–Kaskol	+ 9' 02"

== Stage 16 ==
13 May 1972 - Torrelavega to Vitoria, 219 km (136 mi)

Route:

Stage 16 result

Rank	Rider	Team	Time
1	Agustín Tamames (ESP)	Werner	6h 35' 28"
2	Domingo Perurena (ESP)	Kas–Kaskol	+ 10"
3	Miguel María Lasa (ESP)	Kas–Kaskol	+ 14"
4	Andrés Oliva (ESP)	La Casera–Peña Bahamontes	+ 20"
5	Leif Mortensen (DEN)	Bic	s.t.
6	Jesús Manzaneque (ESP)	Kas–Kaskol	s.t.
7	José Luis Uribezubia (ESP)	Werner	s.t.
8	Juan Zurano (ESP)	La Casera–Peña Bahamontes	s.t.
9	Désiré Letort (FRA)	Bic	s.t.
10	Manuel Blanco Garea (ESP)	Werner	s.t.

General classification after Stage 16

Rank	Rider	Team	Time
1	José Manuel Fuente (ESP)	Kas–Kaskol	79h 11' 33"
2	Miguel María Lasa (ESP)	Kas–Kaskol	+ 7' 22"
3	Agustín Tamames (ESP)	Werner	+ 7' 46"
4	Domingo Perurena (ESP)	Kas–Kaskol	+ 8' 30"
5	Gonzalo Aja (ESP)	Karpy	+ 8' 40"
6	Jesús Manzaneque (ESP)	Kas–Kaskol	+ 8' 41"
7	Désiré Letort (FRA)	Bic	+ 8' 45"
8	Bernard Labourdette (FRA)	Bic	+ 8' 49"
9	José Pesarrodona (ESP)	Kas–Kaskol	+ 9' 00"
10	José Antonio González (ESP)	Kas–Kaskol	+ 9' 10"

== Stage 17a ==
14 May 1972 - Vitoria to San Sebastián, 138 km (86 mi)

Route:

Stage 17a result

Rank	Rider	Team	Time
1	Jesús Aranzabal (ESP)	Bic	2h 47' 02"
2	Antonio Gómez del Moral (ESP)	Karpy	+ 2' 13"
3	Claudio Michelotto (ITA)	G.B.C.–Sony	+ 2' 20"
4	Pietro Dallai (ITA)	Van Cauter–Magniflex–de Gribaldy	+ 3' 13"
5	Jan van Katwijk (NED)	Goudsmit–Hoff	s.t.
6	Félix González (ESP)	La Casera–Peña Bahamontes	s.t.
7	José Manuel López (ESP)	Werner	s.t.
8	Aldo Moser (ITA)	G.B.C.–Sony	s.t.
9	José Albelda Tormo (ESP)	Karpy	+ 8' 40"
10	Luis Santamarina (ESP)	Werner	+ 8' 44"

== Stage 17b ==
14 May 1972 - San Sebastián to San Sebastián, 20 km (12 mi) (ITT)

Stage 17b result

Rank	Rider	Team	Time
1	José Antonio González (ESP)	Kas–Kaskol	25' 47"
2	Miguel María Lasa (ESP)	Kas–Kaskol	+ 14"
3	Agustín Tamames (ESP)	Werner	+ 18"
4	Gonzalo Aja (ESP)	Karpy	+ 29"
5	José Pesarrodona (ESP)	Kas–Kaskol	+ 36"
6	Leif Mortensen (DEN)	Bic	+ 38"
7	Jesús Manzaneque (ESP)	Kas–Kaskol	+ 44"
8	Domingo Perurena (ESP)	Kas–Kaskol	+ 51"
9	Désiré Letort (FRA)	Bic	+ 59"
10	José Manuel Fuente (ESP)	Kas–Kaskol	+ 1' 02"

General classification after Stage 17b

Rank	Rider	Team	Time
1	José Manuel Fuente (ESP)	Kas–Kaskol	82h 34' 14"
2	Miguel María Lasa (ESP)	Kas–Kaskol	+ 6' 34"
3	Agustín Tamames (ESP)	Werner	+ 7' 00"
4	Gonzalo Aja (ESP)	Karpy	+ 8' 07"
5	José Antonio González (ESP)	Kas–Kaskol	+ 8' 08"
6	Domingo Perurena (ESP)	Kas–Kaskol	+ 8' 23"
7	Jesús Manzaneque (ESP)	Kas–Kaskol	+ 8' 27"
8	José Pesarrodona (ESP)	Kas–Kaskol	+ 8' 38"
9	Désiré Letort (FRA)	Bic	+ 8' 42"
10	Bernard Labourdette (FRA)	Bic	+ 8' 54"
