= 1972 GP Ouest-France =

Race details
- Dates: 22 August 1972
- Stages: 1
- Distance: 255 km (158.4 mi)
- Winning time: 6h 35' 00"

Results
	Winner	Robert Bouloux (FRA)
	Second	Gérard Besnard (FRA)
	Third	Enzo Mattioda (FRA)

The 1972 GP Ouest-France was the 36th edition of the GP Ouest-France cycle race and was held on 22 August 1972. The race started and finished in Plouay. The race was won by Robert Bouloux.

== General classification ==
Final general classification

Rank	Rider	Time
1	Robert Bouloux (FRA)	6h 35' 00"
2	Gérard Besnard (FRA)	+ 8"
3	Enzo Mattioda (FRA)	+ 17"
4	Jean-Claude Daunat (FRA)	+ 35"
5	Gianni Marcarini (FRA)	+ 40"
6	Claude Mazeaud (FRA)	+ 40"
7	Georges Chappe (FRA)	+ 43"
8	René Grenier (FRA)	+ 10' 35"
9	Loïc Le Bourhis (FRA)	+ 11' 08"
10	François Goasduff (FRA)	+ 11' 08"
