= Merlin Plage–Shimano–Flandria =

Team information
- Registered: France
- Founded: 1974
- Disbanded: 1974
- Discipline: Road
- Bicycles: Flandria

Key personnel
- General manager: Jacques Cadiou

Team name history
- 1974: Merlin Plage–Shimano–Flandria

Merlin Plage–Shimano–Flandria was a French professional cycling team that existed in 1974. It was linked to the Belgian team Carpenter–Confortluxe–Flandria. It participated in the 1974 Tour de France, with Cyrille Guimard winning a stage.

== Team roster ==
The following is a list of riders on the Merlin Plage squad during the 1974 season, with age given for 1 January 1974.

| Rider | Date of birth |
|---|---|
| Christian Ardouin (FRA) | 18 April 1952 (aged 21) |
| Fernand Bruggeman (BEL) | 19 April 1949 (aged 24) |
| Raphaël Coene (BEL) | 5 November 1950 (aged 23) |
| André Corbeau (FRA) | 1 April 1950 (aged 23) |
| Michel Coroller (FRA) | 10 May 1949 (aged 24) |
| Régis Delépine (FRA) | 22 December 1946 (aged 27) |
| Michel Demore (FRA) | 29 September 1948 (aged 25) |
| André Dierickx (BEL) | 29 October 1947 (aged 26) |
| Maurice Dury (BEL) | 8 November 1947 (aged 26) |
| Henri Fin (FRA) | 10 March 1950 (aged 23) |

| Rider | Date of birth |
|---|---|
| Cyrille Guimard (FRA) | 20 January 1947 (aged 26) |
| Joël Millard (FRA) | 23 January 1946 (aged 27) |
| Jean-Claude Misac (FRA) | 27 October 1948 (aged 25) |
| Gérard Moneyron (FRA) | 17 January 1948 (aged 25) |
| Daniel Rébillard (FRA) | 20 December 1948 (aged 25) |
| Jean-Jacques Sanquer (FRA) | 29 November 1946 (aged 27) |
| Alain van Lancker (FRA) | 15 May 1947 (aged 26) |
| Ghislain Van Landeghem (BEL) | 18 July 1949 (aged 24) |
| Noël Vantyghem (BEL) | 9 October 1947 (aged 26) |
