= Kelleners =

Kelleners is a surname. Notable people with the surname include:

- Helmut Kelleners (born 1939), German racing driver
- Ralf Kelleners (born 1968), German racing driver
- Wim Kelleners (1950–2026), Dutch cyclist
