= Michel Coulon =

Michel Coulon may refer to:

- Michel Coulon (cyclist)
- Michel Coulon (footballer)
