= 1972 Vuelta a España =

Race details
- Dates: 27 April – 14 May
- Stages: 17
- Distance: 3,079.3 km (1,913 mi)
- Winning time: 82h 34' 14"

Results
Jersey awarded to the overall winner	Winner	José Manuel Fuente (ESP)	(Kas–Kaskol)
	Second	Miguel María Lasa (ESP)	(Kas–Kaskol)
	Third	Agustín Tamames (ESP)	(Werner)
Jersey awarded to the points classification winner	Points	Domingo Perurena (ESP)	(Kas–Kaskol)
	Mountains	José Manuel Fuente (ESP)	(Kas–Kaskol)
Jersey awarded to the combination classification winner	Combination	José Manuel Fuente (ESP)	(Kas–Kaskol)
	Sprints	Ventura Díaz (ESP)	(Werner)

The 27th Edition Vuelta a España (Tour of Spain), a long-distance bicycle stage race and one of the three grand tours, was held from 27 April to 14 May 1972. It consisted of 17 stages covering a total of 3,079.3 km (1,913.4 mi), and was won by José Manuel Fuente of the Kas–Kaskol cycling team. Fuente also won the mountains classification while Domingo Perurena won the points classification.

== Route ==
List of stages
Stage	Date	Course	Distance	Type	Winner
P	27 April	Fuengirola to Fuengirola	6 km (4 mi)	Individual time trial	René Pijnen (NED)
1	28 April	Fuengirola to Cabra	167 km (104 mi)		Miguel María Lasa (ESP)
2	29 April	Cabra to Granada	206 km (128 mi)		Gerard Vianen (NED)
3	30 April	Granada to Almería	181 km (112 mi)		Domingo Perurena (ESP)
4	1 May	Almería to Dehesa de Campoamor	251 km (156 mi)		Ger Harings (NED)
5	2 May	Dehesa de Campoamor to Gandia	183 km (114 mi)		Pieter Nassen (BEL)
6a	3 May	Gandia to El Saler	120 km (75 mi)		Roger Kindt (BEL)
6b	3 May	El Saler to El Saler	6.5 km (4 mi)	Team time trial	Kas–Kaskol
7	4 May	Valencia to Vinaròs	181 km (112 mi)		Jos van der Vleuten (NED)
8	5 May	Vinaròs to Tarragona	189 km (117 mi)		Cees Koeken (NED)
9a	6 May	Tarragona to Barcelona	118 km (73 mi)		Ger Harings (NED)
9b	6 May	Barcelona to Barcelona	10 km (6 mi)	Individual time trial	Jesús Manzaneque (ESP)
10	7 May	Barcelona to Banyoles	192 km (119 mi)		Domingo Perurena (ESP)
11	8 May	Manresa to Zaragoza	259 km (161 mi)		Luis Balagué (ESP)
12	9 May	Zaragoza to Formigal	169 km (105 mi)		José Manuel Fuente (ESP)
13	10 May	Sangüesa to Arrate	201 km (125 mi)		Agustín Tamames (ESP)
14	11 May	Eibar to Bilbao	145 km (90 mi)		Miguel María Lasa (ESP)
15	12 May	Bilbao to Torrelavega	148 km (92 mi)		Gerard Vianen (NED)
16	13 May	Torrelavega to Vitoria	219 km (136 mi)		Agustín Tamames (ESP)
17a	14 May	Vitoria to San Sebastián	138 km (86 mi)		Jesús Aranzabal (ESP)
17b	14 May	San Sebastián to San Sebastián	20 km (12 mi)	Individual time trial	José Antonio González (ESP)
	Total		3,079.3 km (1,913 mi)		

== Results ==
=== Final General Classification ===
Rank	Rider	Team	Time
1	(Spain) José Manuel Fuente	Kas–Kaskol	82h 34' 14"
2	(Spain) Miguel María Lasa	Kas–Kaskol	+ 6' 34"
3	(Spain) Agustín Tamames	Werner	+ 7' 00"
4	(Spain) Gonzalo Aja Barguin	Karpy	+ 8' 07"
5	(Spain) José Antonio Gonzalez	Kas–Kaskol	+ 8' 08s
6	(Spain) Domingo Perurena Tellechea	Kas–Kaskol	+ 8' 23"
7	(Spain) Jesús Manzaneque	Kas–Kaskol	+ 8' 27"
8	(Spain) José Pesarrodona	Kas–Kaskol	+ 8' 38"
9	(France) Désiré Letort	Bic	+ 8' 42"
10	(France) Bernard Labourdette	Bic	+ 8' 54"
11	(Spain) Andrés Oliva Sánchez	La Casera-Pena Bahamontes	
12	(Spain) Vicente López Carril	Kas–Kaskol	
13	(Spain) Eduardo Castelló	Karpy	
14	(Spain) Ventura Díaz Arrey	Werner	
15	(Spain) José Manuel Blanco	Werner	
16	(Spain) José Luis Uribezubia	Werner	
17	(Spain) Juan Zurano Jérez	La Casera-Pena Bahamontes	
18	(Spain) Francisco Galdós Gauna	Kas–Kaskol	
19	(Spain) Santiago Lazcano Labaca	Kas–Kaskol	
20	(Spain) Eufronio Enrique Santos	La Casera-Pena Bahamontes	
21	(Spain) Juan-Manuel Valls	Karpy	
22	(Spain) José Luis Abilleira	La Casera-Pena Bahamontes	
23	(Denmark) Leif Mortensen	Bic	
24	(Italy) Silvano Schiavon	GBC-Sony	
25	(Spain) Antonio Menéndez	Karpy	
