= Alaimo =

Alaimo is a surname. Notable people with the surname include:

- Anthony Alaimo (1920–2009), United States district court judge
- Jay Alaimo (born 1972), American movie director, writer and producer
- Lorenzo Alaimo (born 1952), Italian racing cyclist
- Marc Alaimo (born 1942), American actor
- Michael Alaimo (actor) (1938–2025), American actor
- Simone Alaimo (born 1950), Italian bass-baritone, uncle of Nicola
- Steve Alaimo (1939–2024), American singer, record producer, and label owner
- William aka Billy Alaimo (Born 1966) Brooklyn New York. American Actor, Professional Wrestler using Ring Name Lucifer.
