= 1969 Brabantse Pijl =

Race details
- Dates: 23 March 1969
- Stages: 1
- Distance: 180 km (111.8 mi)
- Winning time: 4h 30' 00"

Results
	Winner	Willy In 't Ven (BEL)
	Second	Jos van der Vleuten (NED)
	Third	Willy Monty (BEL)

The 1969 Brabantse Pijl was the ninth edition of the Brabantse Pijl cycle race and was held on 23 March 1969. The race started and finished in Sint-Genesius-Rode. The race was won by Willy In 't Ven.

== General classification ==
Final general classification

Rank	Rider	Time
1	Willy In 't Ven (BEL)	4h 30' 00"
2	Jos van der Vleuten (NED)	+ 5"
3	Willy Monty (BEL)	+ 8"
4	Jos Huysmans (BEL)	+ 10"
5	Victor Van Schil (BEL)	+ 13"
6	Jos Spruyt (BEL)	+ 17"
7	Patrick Sercu (BEL)	+ 22"
8	Michel Coulon (BEL)	+ 30"
9	Georges Pintens (BEL)	+ 50"
10	Georges Van Coningsloo (BEL)	+ 1' 30"
