= Jo Vrancken =

Dutch cyclist

Personal information
- Born: 20 November 1948 (age 77)

Cycling career
- Sport: Cycling
- Role: Rider

Jo Vrancken (born 20 November 1948) is a Dutch racing cyclist. He rode in the 1973 Tour de France.
