= Fernando Plaza =

Spanish cyclist

Personal information
- Born: 22 November 1947 (age 78)

Cycling career
- Sport: Cycling
- Role: Rider

Fernando Plaza (born 22 November 1947) is a Spanish racing cyclist. He rode in the 1974 Tour de France.
