= Ludovic Noels =

Belgian cyclist

Personal information
- Born: 22 December 1951 (age 74)

Cycling career
- Sport: Cycling
- Role: Rider

Ludovic Noels (born 22 December 1951) is a Belgian racing cyclist. He rode in the 1973 Tour de France.
