= Émile Bodart =

Belgian cyclist

Personal information
- Born: 8 April 1942 (age 84)

Cycling career
- Sport: Cycling
- Role: Rider

Émile Bodart (born 8 April 1942) is a Belgian racing cyclist. He rode in the 1973 Tour de France.
