= Gérard Briend =

French cyclist

Personal information
- Born: 26 March 1947 (age 79)

Cycling career
- Sport: Cycling
- Role: Rider

Gérard Briend (born 26 March 1947) is a French racing cyclist. He rode in the 1972 Tour de France.
