= Bernard Masson =

French cyclist

Personal information
- Born: 20 September 1948
- Died: 22 December 1977 (aged 29)

Cycling career
- Sport: Cycling
- Role: Rider

Bernard Masson (20 September 1948 – 22 December 1977) was a French racing cyclist. He rode in the 1974 Tour de France.
