= Jean-Pierre Guillemot =

French cyclist

Personal information
- Born: 25 September 1950 (age 76)

Cycling career
- Sport: Cycling
- Role: Rider

Jean-Pierre Guillemot (born 25 September 1950) is a French racing cyclist. He rode in the 1974 Tour de France.
