= Will De Vlam =

Dutch cyclist

Personal information
- Born: 22 August 1947 (age 79)

Cycling career
- Sport: Cycling
- Role: Rider

Will De Vlam (born 22 August 1947) is a Dutch racing cyclist. He rode in the 1974 Tour de France.
