= Ghislain Van Landeghem =

Belgian cyclist

Personal information
- Born: 18 July 1948 (age 78) Belsele, East Flanders, Belgium

Cycling career
- Sport: Cycling
- Discipline: Road
- Role: Rider

Professional teams
- 1971–1972: Hertekamp–Magniflex
- 1973: Flandria–Carpenter–Shimano
- 1974: Merlin Plage–Shimano–Flandria
- 1975: Rokado
- 1976–1977: Maes Pils–Rokado
- 1978: Mini-Flat–Boule d'Or–Colnago
- 1979: IJsboerke–Warncke Eis
- 1980: Solahart–Hercka
- 1981: Masta–H. Peeters–BBS

Ghislain Van Landeghem (born 18 July 1948) is a Belgian former racing cyclist. He was a professional racer from 1971 to 1981 and rode in the 1974 Tour de France.

== Major results ==
1973
7th GP Stad Zottegem
1975
8th Druivenkoers-Overijse
1978
5th Nationale Sluitingprijs
1980
1st Omloop Schelde-Durme
