= Lorenzo Alaimo =

Italian cyclist

Personal information
- Full name: Lorenzo Alaimo
- Born: 15 June 1952 (age 74) Hensies, Belgium

Cycling career
- Sport: Cycling
- Role: Rider

Lorenzo Alaimo (born 15 June 1952) is a former Italian racing cyclist. He finished in last place in the 1974 Tour de France.
