= Richard Podesta =

French cyclist

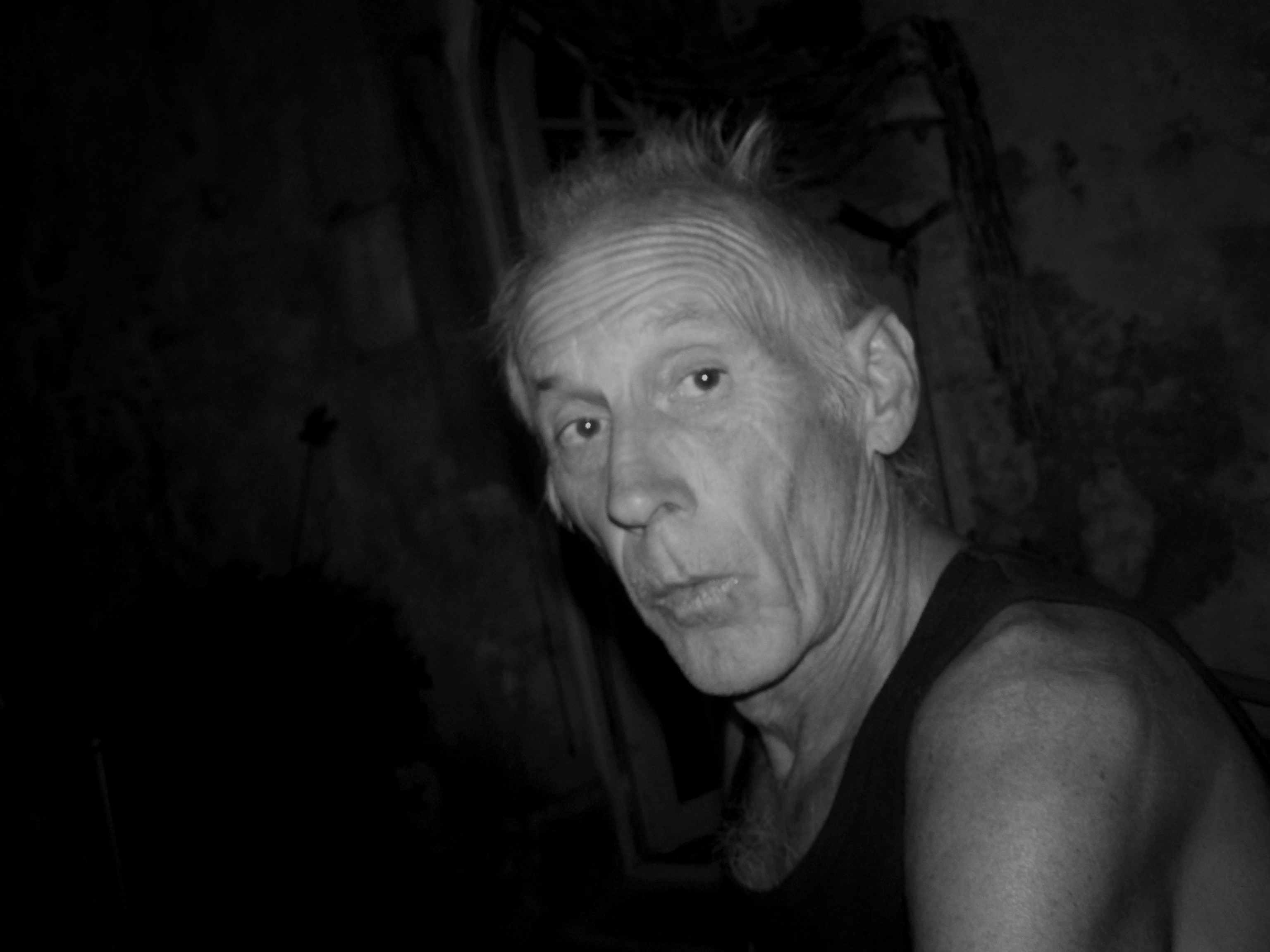

Personal information
- Born: 1 March 1948 (age 78)

Cycling career
- Sport: Cycling
- Role: Rider

Richard Podesta (born 1 March 1948) is a French racing cyclist. He rode in the 1973 Tour de France.
