= Michel Coroller =

French cyclist

Personal information
- Born: 10 May 1949 (age 77)

Cycling career
- Sport: Cycling
- Role: Rider

Michel Coroller (born 10 May 1949) is a French racing cyclist. He rode in the 1974 Tour de France.
