= Noël Geneste =

French cyclist

Personal information
- Born: 17 December 1947 (age 78) Cusset, France

Cycling career
- Sport: Cycling
- Role: Rider

Noël Geneste (born 17 December 1947) is a French former racing cyclist. He rode in the 1973 Tour de France.
