= Herculano de Oliveira =

Portuguese cyclist

Personal information
- Born: 20 April 1946 (age 80)

Cycling career
- Sport: Cycling
- Role: Rider

Herculano de Oliveira (born 20 April 1946) is a Portuguese racing cyclist. He rode in the 1973 Tour de France.
