= Marcel Boishardy =

French cyclist

Personal information
- Born: 7 February 1945
- Died: 23 September 2011 (aged 66)

Cycling career
- Sport: Cycling
- Role: Rider

Marcel Boishardy (7 February 1945 – 23 September 2011) was a French racing cyclist. He rode in the 1973 Tour de France.
