= Jean-Claude Daunat =

French cyclist

Personal information
- Born: 14 September 1945
- Died: 26 December 1999 (aged 54)

Cycling career
- Sport: Cycling
- Role: Rider

Jean-Claude Daunat (14 September 1945 – 26 December 1999) was a French racing cyclist. He rode in the 1971 Tour de France.
