= Charles Genthon =

French cyclist (born 1947)

Personal information
- Born: 27 May 1947 (age 79)

Cycling career
- Sport: Cycling
- Role: Rider

Charles Genthon (born 27 May 1947) is a French racing cyclist. He rode in the 1973 Tour de France.
