= Loïc Le Bourhis =

French cyclist (born 1949)

Personal information
- Born: 24 February 1949 (age 77)

Cycling career
- Sport: Cycling
- Role: Rider

Loïc Le Bourhis (born 24 February 1949) is a former French racing cyclist. He rode in the 1972 Tour de France.
