= El Saler =

Coordinates: 39.3825°N 0.3325°W

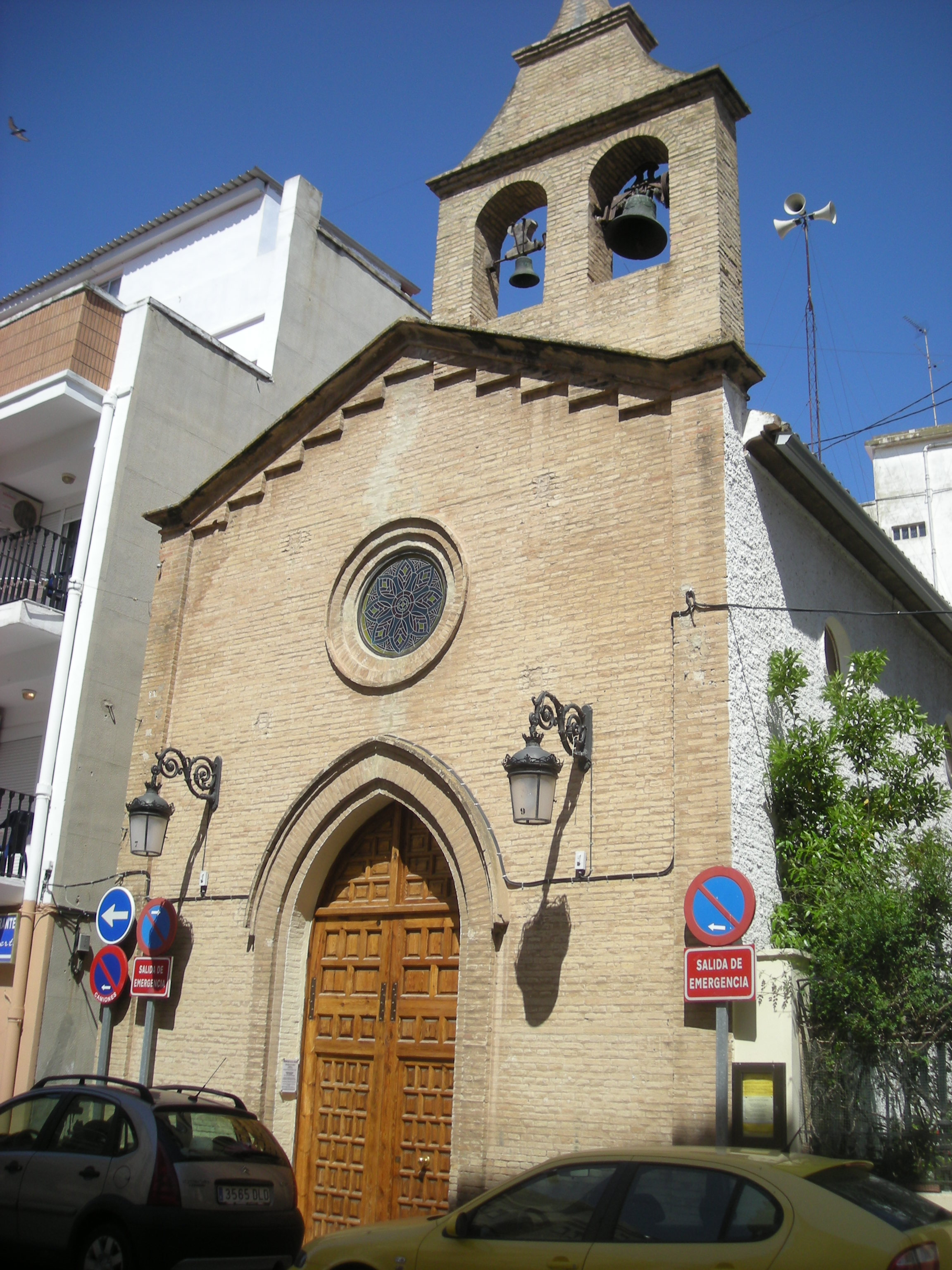
- Interactive map of El Saler
- Country: Spain
- Province: Valencia
- Municipality: Valencia
- Elevation: 3 m (9.8 ft)

Population (2009)
  - Total: 1,699

El Saler is a village in Valencia, Spain. It is part of the municipality of Valencia.

== History ==
In September 2012, the small container ship Celia (IMO 9184237) and the bulk carrier Bsle Sunrise (IMO 9017628) both ran aground on the beach at El Saler during a heavy storm. Both ships caused lasting damage to the beach during their grounding and salvage. On 24 October 2012 Ceilia was refloated. Bsle Sunrise was refloated on November 2.
