= Harrie Van Leeuwen =

Dutch cyclist

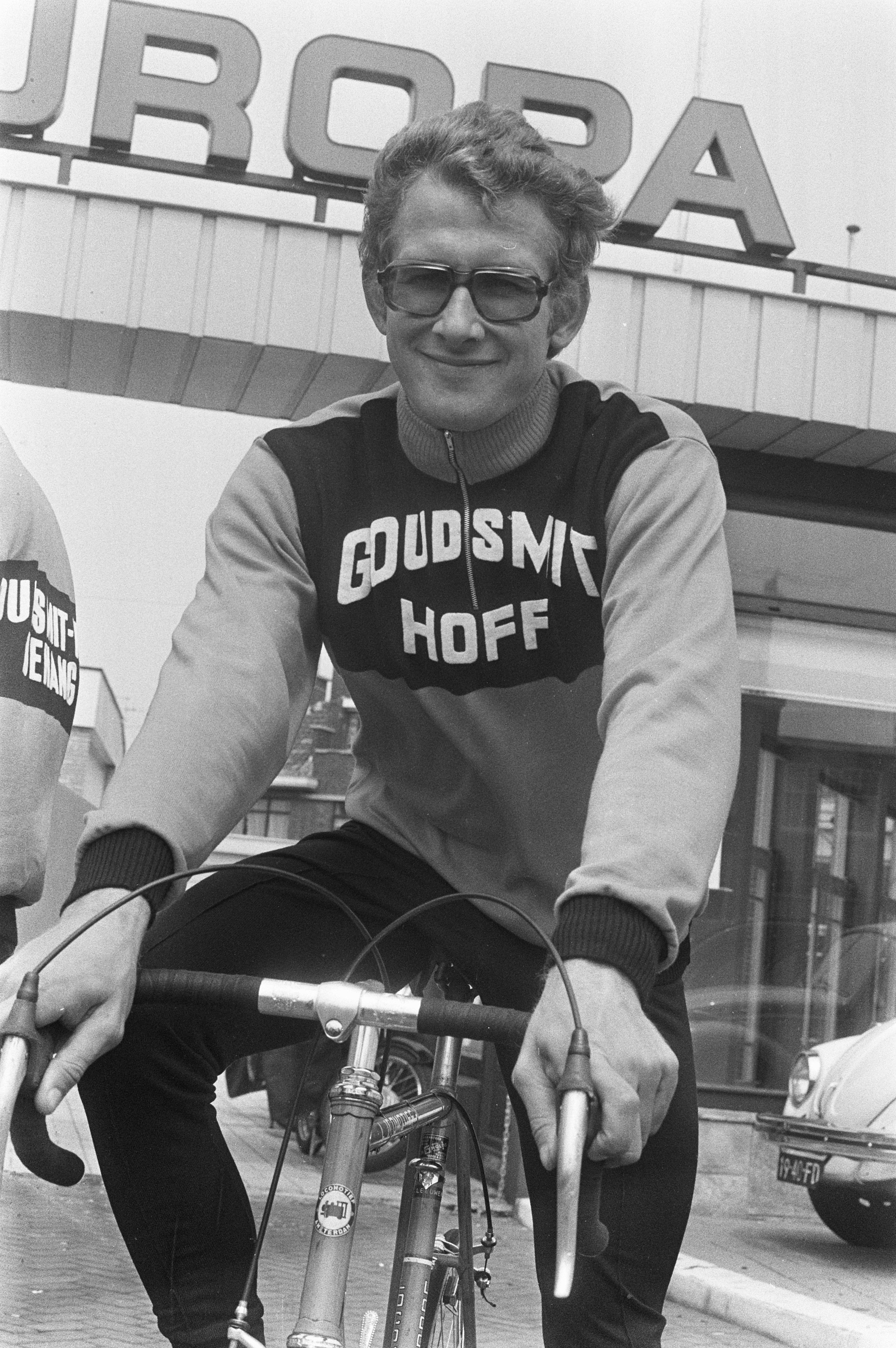

Personal information
- Born: 29 July 1945
- Died: 31 December 2009 (aged 64)

Cycling career
- Sport: Cycling
- Role: Rider

Harrie Van Leeuwen (29 July 1945 – 31 December 2009) was a Dutch racing cyclist. He rode in the 1972 Tour de France.
