= Roger Kindt =

Belgian cyclist

Personal information
- Born: 18 September 1945
- Died: 3 April 1992 (aged 46)

Cycling career
- Sport: Cycling
- Discipline: Road
- Role: Rider

Roger Kindt (18 September 1945 – 3 April 1992) was a Belgian racing cyclist. He rode in the 1972 Tour de France and won the sixth stage of the 1972 Vuelta a España.
