= Jacques-André Hochart =

French cyclist

Personal information
- Full name: Jacques-André Hochart
- Born: 29 July 1948 Paris, France
- Died: 30 May 2014 (aged 65)

Cycling career
- Sport: Cycling
- Role: Rider

Jacques-André Hochart (29 July 1948 – 30 May 2014) was a French racing cyclist. He finished in last place in the 1973 Tour de France.
