= Joseph Carletti =

French cyclist

Personal information
- Born: 12 March 1946 (age 80)

Cycling career
- Sport: Cycling
- Role: Rider

Joseph Carletti (born 12 March 1946) is a French racing cyclist. He rode in the 1973 Tour de France.
