= René Grenier =

French cyclist

Personal information
- Born: 23 December 1943
- Died: 5 February 2004 (aged 60)

Cycling career
- Sport: Cycling
- Role: Rider

René Grenier (23 December 1943 – 5 February 2004) was a French racing cyclist. He rode in the 1972 Tour de France.
