= Jean-Claude Baud =

French cyclist (born 1948)

Personal information
- Born: 14 February 1948 (age 78)

Cycling career
- Sport: Cycling
- Role: Rider

Jean-Claude Baud (born 14 February 1948) is a French former racing cyclist. He rode in the 1973 Tour de France.
