= Willy Abbeloos =

Belgian cyclist

Personal information
- Born: 20 March 1949 (age 77) Opwijk, Belgium

Cycling career
- Sport: Cycling
- Role: Rider

Willy Abbeloos (born 20 March 1949) is a Belgian racing cyclist. He rode in the 1972 Tour de France.
