= Wim Kelleners =

Dutch cyclist (1950–2026)

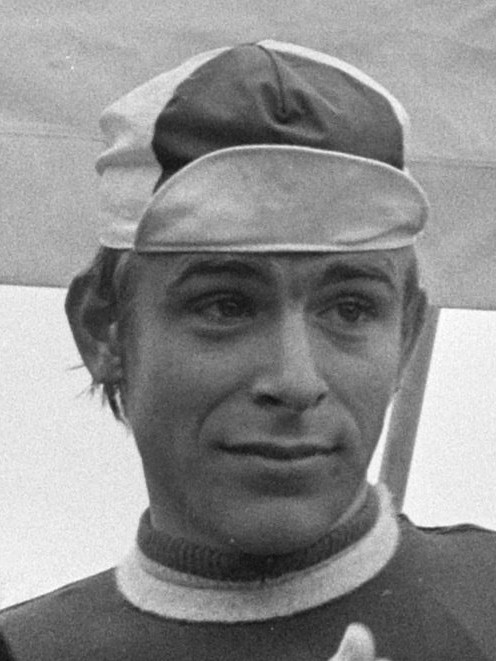
- Kelleners in 1971

Personal information
- Born: 9 May 1950 Heerlen, Netherlands
- Died: 15 January 2026 (aged 75) Roermond, Netherlands

Cycling career
- Sport: Cycling
- Role: Rider

Wim Kelleners (9 May 1950 – 15 January 2026) was a Dutch racing cyclist. He rode in the 1973 Tour de France.

Kelleners died on 15 January 2026, at the age of 75.
