= Robert Bouloux =

French cyclist

Personal information
- Born: 20 May 1947 (age 79) Ploubalay, France

Cycling career
- Sport: Cycling
- Role: Rider

Robert Bouloux (born 20 May 1947) is a French former cyclist. His sporting career began with ACBB Paris. He competed in the team time trial at the 1968 Summer Olympics.
