= Mathieu Pustjens =

Dutch cyclist (born 1948)

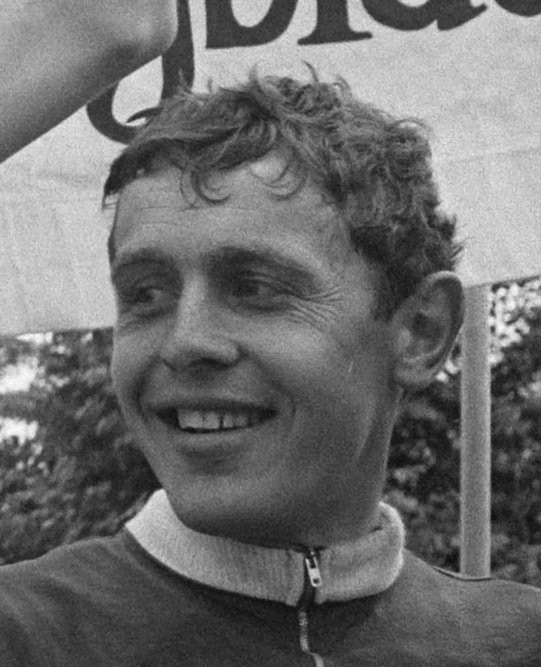

Personal information
- Born: 20 February 1948 (age 78) Roosteren, Limburg, Netherlands

Cycling career
- Sport: Cycling
- Role: Rider

Professional teams
- 1972: Sonolor
- 1973: Canada Dry-Gazelle
- 1974: Timoil

Mathieu Pustjens (born 20 February 1948) is a Dutch racing cyclist. He rode in the 1972 Tour de France.
