= Cees Koeken =

Dutch cyclist

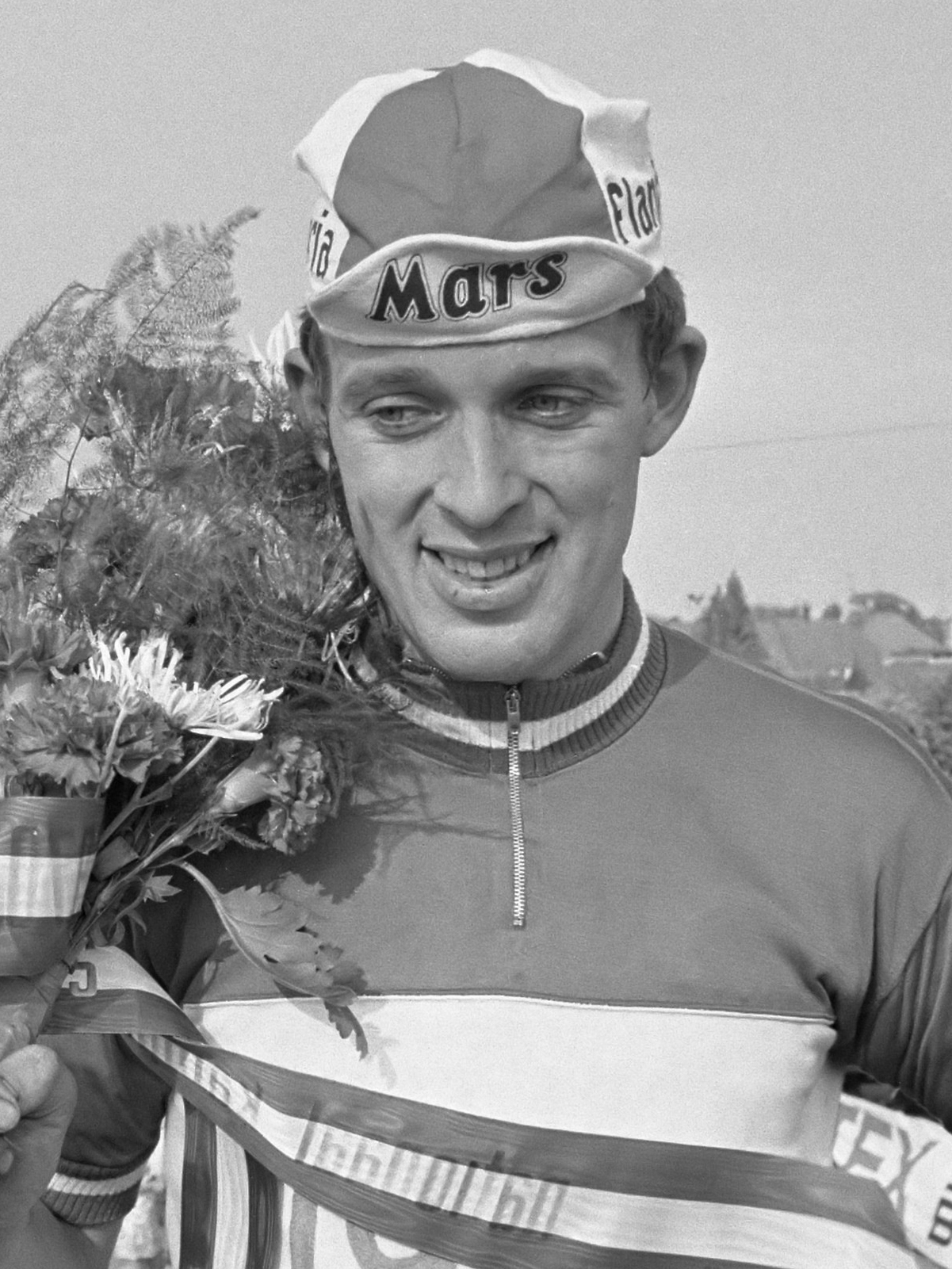
- Koeken in 1970

Personal information
- Born: 29 October 1948 (age 77) Achtmaal, Netherlands

Cycling career
- Sport: Cycling
- Current team: Retired
- Discipline: Road
- Role: Rider

Cees Koeken (born 29 October 1948) is a Dutch former cyclist.

== Major results ==
1967
3rd Ronde van Midden-Zeeland
1971
1st Stage 1 Olympia's Tour
1st Stage 4 Tour of Britain
1972
1st Stage 8 Vuelta a España
1st Stage 9 Tour de l'Avenir
5th Paris–Tours
