= Joël Millard =

French cyclist (born 1946)

Personal information
- Born: 23 January 1946 (age 80)

Cycling career
- Sport: Cycling
- Role: Rider

Joël Millard (born 23 January 1946) is a French racing cyclist. He rode in the 1972 Tour de France.
