= Michel Coulon (cyclist) =

Belgian cyclist

Personal information
- Born: 12 January 1947 Jamioulx, Belgium
- Died: 16 April 2023 Jamioulx, Belgium

Cycling career
- Sport: Cycling
- Discipline: Road
- Role: Rider

Professional teams
- 1968–1970: Flandria–De Clerck
- 1971–1973: Watney–Avia

Michel Coulon (12 January 1947 – 16 April 2023) was a Belgian former cyclist. He competed in the team time trial at the 1968 Summer Olympics. He also competed in four editions of the Tour de France.

== Major results ==
1968
5th Overall Tour de l'Avenir

1st Stage 1

1969
8th Brabantse Pijl
1971
5th Brussel–Ingooigem
1972
9th Overall Tour of Belgium

1st Prologue (TTT)

1973
1st Stage 2 (TTT) Tour de France
