= Jean-Jacques Sanquer =

French cyclist

Personal information
- Born: 29 November 1946
- Died: 6 June 1984 (aged 37)

Cycling career
- Sport: Cycling
- Role: Rider

Jean-Jacques Sanquer (29 November 1946 – 6 June 1984) was a French racing cyclist. He rode in the 1971 Tour de France.
