= Ger Harings =

Dutch cyclist born 1948

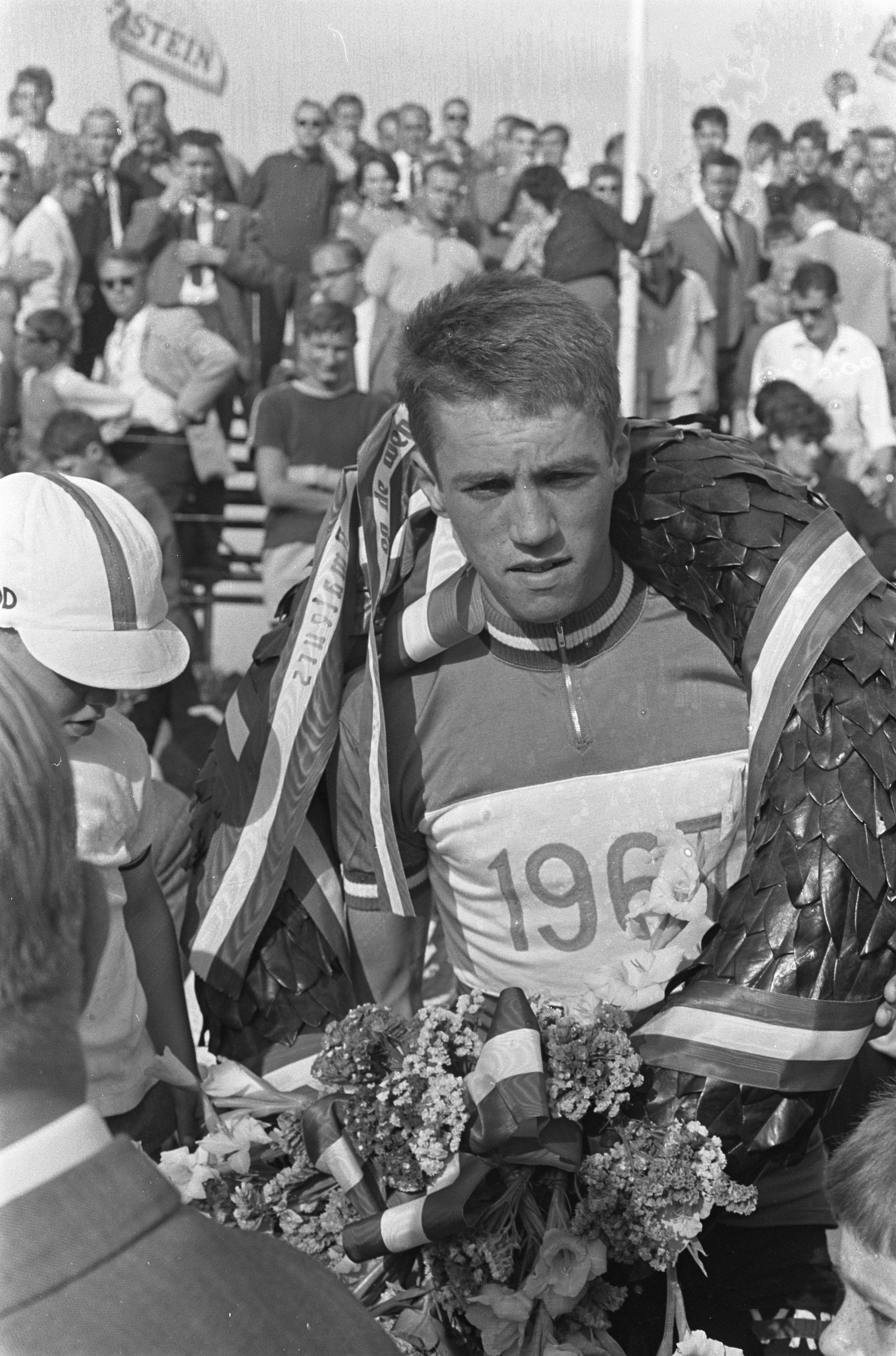

Personal information
- Born: 25 May 1948 (age 78)

Cycling career
- Sport: Cycling
- Role: Rider

Ger Harings (born 25 May 1948) is a Dutch racing cyclist. He rode in the 1971 Tour de France.
