= Wim Prinsen =

Dutch cyclist

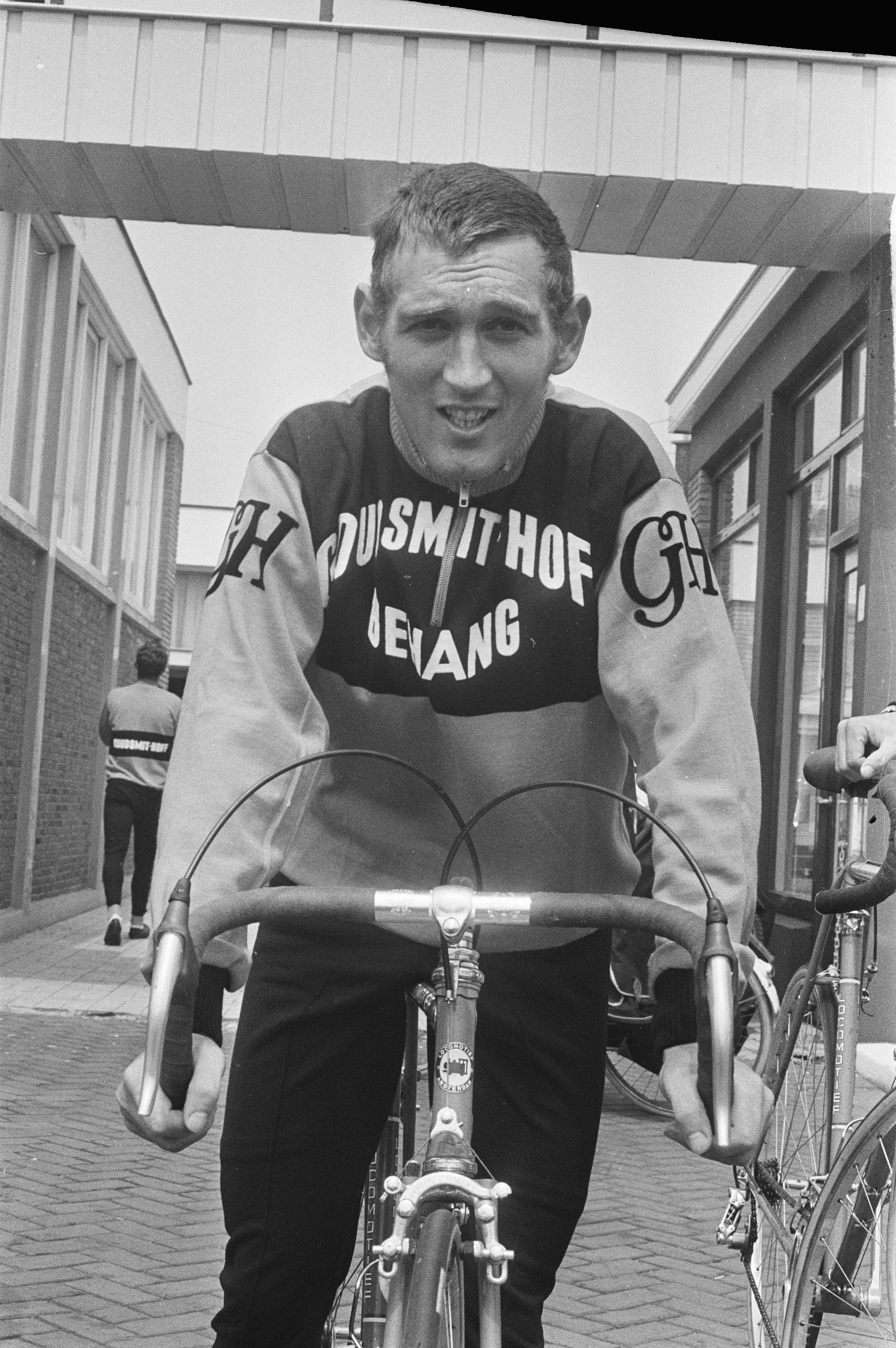

Personal information
- Born: 8 March 1945 Haastrecht, Netherlands
- Died: 17 December 1977 (aged 32) Oosterhout, Netherlands

Cycling career
- Sport: Cycling
- Discipline: Road
- Role: Rider

Professional teams
- 1971–1972: Goudsmit–Hoff
- 1973: Canada Dry–Gazelle
- 1974: Frisol–Flair Plastics
- 1975: Ormas–Sharp
- 1976: Gero–Eurosol–Van Looy
- 1977: Ruysdael–De Kruik–Piccadilly

Wim Prinsen (8 March 1945 – 17 December 1977) was a Dutch racing cyclist. He rode in the 1971 Tour de France.
