= Gerard Vianen =

Dutch cyclist

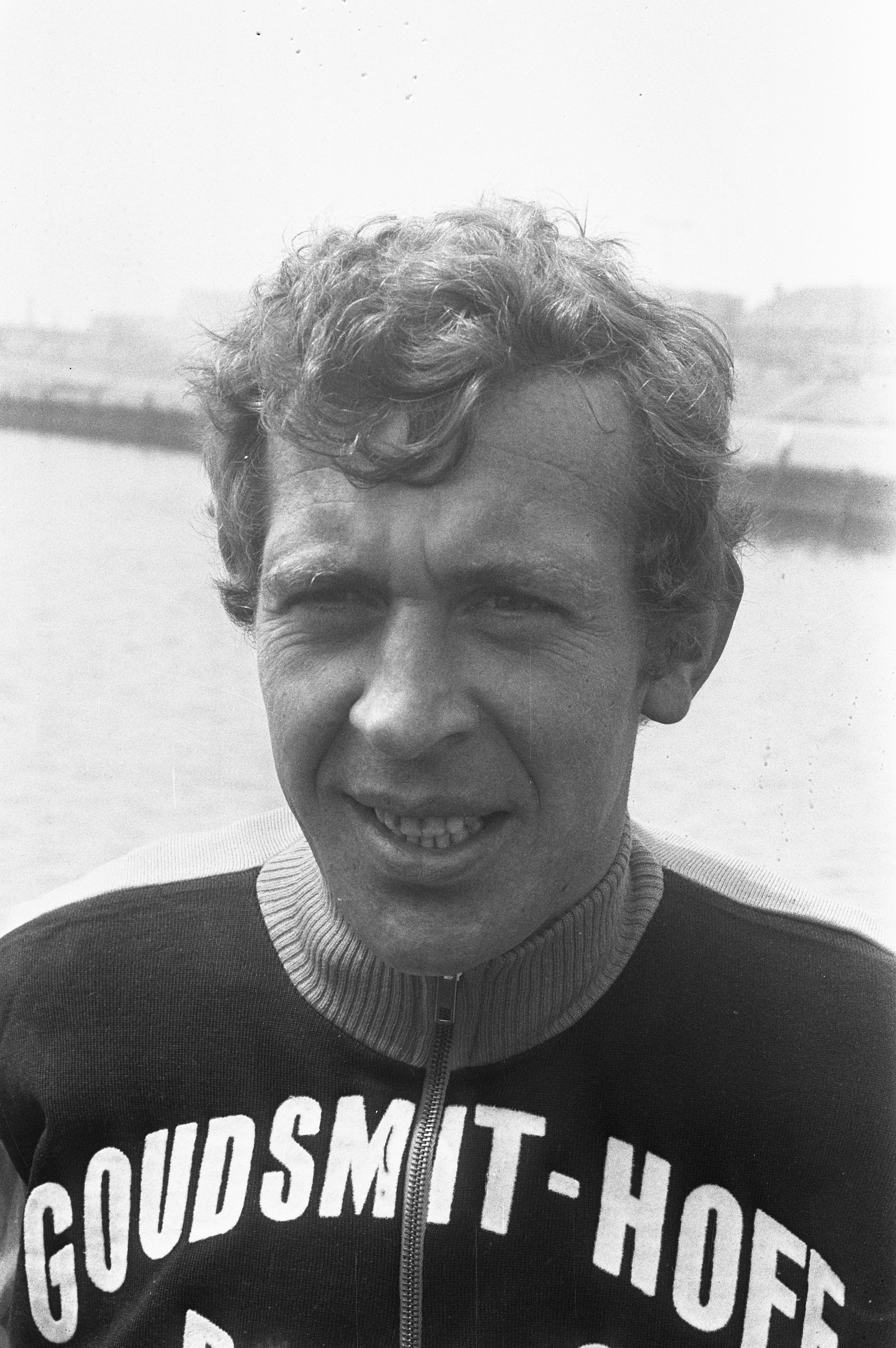

Personal information
- Full name: Gerard Vianen
- Born: 9 February 1944 Kockengen, the Netherlands
- Died: 10 December 2014 (aged 70)

Cycling career
- Sport: Cycling
- Discipline: Road
- Role: Rider

Professional teams
- 1967-1970: Caballero
- 1971: Fagor-Mercier
- 1972: Goudsmit-Hof
- 1973: Gitane
- 1974-1976: Gan-Mercier

Major wins
- Grand Tours Tour de France 1 individual stage (1974) Vuelta a España 3 individual stages (1971, 1972 2x)

Gerard Vianen (9 February 1944 – 10 December 2014) was a Dutch professional road bicycle racer. A domestique for Joop Zoetemelk and Raymond Poulidor, he won one stage in the Tour de France and 3 stages in the Vuelta a España.

Vianen died from leukemia on 10 December 2014 at the age of 70.

== Major results ==
1965
GP Faber
1966
Ronde van Overijssel
1967
Eeklo
Kampioenschap van Vlaanderen
Ninove
1968
Neerbeek
Yerseke
1970
Kamerik
1971
Vuelta a España:

Winner stage 10

Genoa–Nice
Schinnen
1972
Vuelta a España:

Winner stages 2 and 15

Rijen
1974
Tour de France:

Winner stage 20

1975
Obbicht
Ronde van Midden-Zeeland
Linne
1977
Kamerik
Galder
