= 1973 Tour de France, Prologue to Stage 10 =

Cycling race stages

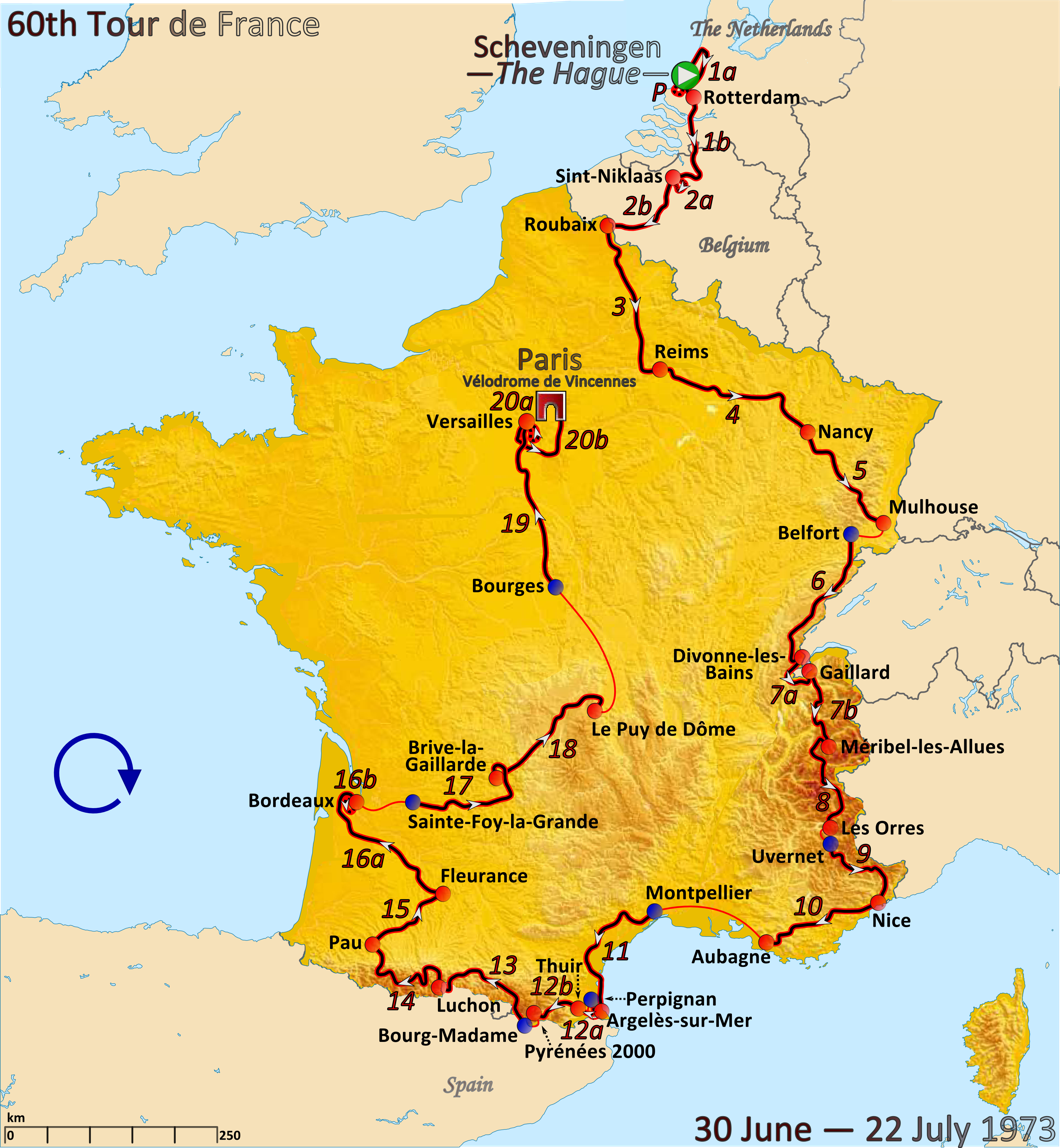
Route of the 1973 Tour de France

The 1973 Tour de France was the 60th edition of Tour de France, one of cycling's Grand Tours. The Tour began in Scheveningen, in the Netherlands, with a prologue individual time trial on 30 June and Stage 10 occurred on 11 July with a mountainous stage to Aubagne. The race finished in Paris on 22 July.

== Prologue ==
30 June 1973 - Scheveningen, 7.1 km (4.4 mi) (ITT)

Prologue result and General Classification after Prologue

	Rider	Team	Time
1	Joop Zoetemelk (NED)	Gitane–Frigécrème	8' 51.21"
2	Raymond Poulidor (FRA)	Gan–Mercier–Hutchinson	+ 11"
3	Jesús Manzaneque (ESP)	La Casera–Bahamontes	+ 12"
4	Herman Van Springel (BEL)	Rokado–De Gribaldy	+ 13"
5	Luis Ocaña (ESP)	Bic	+ 15"
6	Georges Pintens (BEL)	Rokado–De Gribaldy	s.t.
7	Yves Hézard (FRA)	Sonolor	+ 17"
8	Charly Grosskost (FRA)	Gan–Mercier–Hutchinson	+ 19"
9	José Viejo (ESP)	La Casera–Bahamontes	+ 20"
10	Cyrille Guimard (FRA)	Gan–Mercier–Hutchinson	+ 21"

== Stage 1a ==
1 July 1973 - Scheveningen to Rotterdam, 84 km (52.2 mi)

Stage 1a result

Rank	Rider	Team	Time
1	Willy Teirlinck (BEL)	Sonolor	1h 47' 44"
2	Willy De Geest (BEL)	Rokado–De Gribaldy	s.t.
3	Robert Mintkiewicz (FRA)	Sonolor	s.t.
4	Jürgen Tschan (FRG)	Peugeot–BP–Michelin	s.t.
5	Alain Nogues (FRA)	Gitane–Frigécrème	s.t.
6	Gerard Vianen (NED)	Gitane–Frigécrème	s.t.
7	Leif Mortensen (DEN)	Bic	s.t.
8	Antonio Menéndez (ESP)	Kas–Kaskol	s.t.
9	Ludo Delcroix (BEL)	Flandria–Carpenter–Shimano	s.t.
10	Sylvain Vasseur (FRA)	Bic	s.t.

General classification after stage 1a

Rank	Rider	Team	Time
1	Willy Teirlinck (BEL)	Sonolor	1h 57' 51"
2	Gerard Vianen (NED)	Gitane–Frigécrème	+ 6"
3	Willy De Geest (BEL)	Rokado–De Gribaldy	s.t.
4	Alain Nogues (FRA)	Gitane–Frigécrème	+ 11"
5	Jürgen Tschan (FRG)	Peugeot–BP–Michelin	+ 14"
6	Leif Mortensen (DEN)	Bic	+ 16"
7	Gustaaf Van Cauter (BEL)	Watney–Maes Pils	+ 17"
8	Tino Tabak (NED)	Sonolor	+ 18"
9	Ludo Delcroix (BEL)	Flandria–Carpenter–Shimano	+ 20"
10	Carlos Melero (ESP)	Kas–Kaskol	+ 24"

== Stage 1b ==
1 July 1973 - Rotterdam to Sint-Niklaas, 137.5 km (85.4 mi)

Stage 1b result

Rank	Rider	Team	Time
1	José Catieau (FRA)	Bic	3h 33' 41"
2	Herman Van Springel (BEL)	Rokado–De Gribaldy	+ 1"
3	Gonzalo Aja (ESP)	Kas–Kaskol	+ 2' 12"
4	Michel Périn (FRA)	Gan–Mercier–Hutchinson	s.t.
5	Matthijs de Koning (NED)	Canada Dry–Gazelle	+ 2' 17"
6	Staf Van Roosbroeck (BEL)	Rokado–De Gribaldy	+ 2' 24"
7	Albert Van Vlierberghe (BEL)	Rokado–De Gribaldy	s.t.
8	Frans Verbeeck (BEL)	Watney–Maes Pils	s.t.
9	Barry Hoban (GBR)	Gan–Mercier–Hutchinson	s.t.
10	Marc Demeyer (BEL)	Flandria–Carpenter–Shimano	s.t.

General classification after stage 1b

Rank	Rider	Team	Time
1	Herman Van Springel (BEL)	Rokado–De Gribaldy	5h 32' 08"
2	José Catieau (FRA)	Bic	+ 30"
3	Willy Teirlinck (BEL)	Sonolor	+ 1' 48"
4	Willy De Geest (BEL)	Rokado–De Gribaldy	+ 1' 50"
5	Gerard Vianen (NED)	Gitane–Frigécrème	+ 1' 54"
6	Alain Nogues (FRA)	Gitane–Frigécrème	+ 1' 59"
7	Jürgen Tschan (FRG)	Peugeot–BP–Michelin	+ 2' 02"
8	Leif Mortensen (DEN)	Bic	+ 2' 04"
9	Gustaaf Van Cauter (BEL)	Watney–Maes Pils	+ 2' 05"
10	Tino Tabak (NED)	Sonolor	+ 2' 06"

== Stage 2a ==
2 July 1973 - Sint-Niklaas, 12.4 km (7.7 mi) (TTT)

Stage 2a result

Rank	Team	Time
1	Watney–Maes Pils	1h 12' 29"
2	Peugeot–BP–Michelin	+ 44"
3	Kas–Kaskol	+ 52"
4	Rokado–De Gribaldy	s.t.
5	Bic	+ 59"
6	Flandria–Carpenter–Shimano	+ 1' 24"
7	Gitane–Frigécrème	+ 1' 47"
8	Sonolor	+ 1' 48"
9	La Casera–Bahamontes	+ 2' 44"
10	Gan–Mercier–Hutchinson	+ 3' 10"

General classification after stage 2a

Rank	Rider	Team	Time
1	Herman Van Springel (BEL)	Rokado–De Gribaldy	5h 32' 08"
2	José Catieau (FRA)	Bic	+ 30"
3	Willy Teirlinck (BEL)	Sonolor	+ 1' 48"
4	Willy De Geest (BEL)	Rokado–De Gribaldy	+ 1' 50"
5	Gerard Vianen (NED)	Gitane–Frigécrème	+ 1' 54"
6	Jürgen Tschan (FRG)	Peugeot–BP–Michelin	+ 1' 56"
7	Alain Nogues (FRA)	Gitane–Frigécrème	+ 1' 59"
8	Leif Mortensen (DEN)	Bic	+ 2' 04"
9	Gustaaf Van Cauter (BEL)	Watney–Maes Pils	+ 2' 05"
10	Tino Tabak (NED)	Sonolor	+ 2' 06"

== Stage 2b ==
2 July 1973 - Sint-Niklaas to Roubaix, 138 km (85.7 mi)

Stage 2b result

Rank	Rider	Team	Time
1	Eddy Verstraeten (BEL)	Watney–Maes Pils	3h 34' 49"
2	Gerard Vianen (NED)	Gitane–Frigécrème	+ 7"
3	Fernando Mendes (POR)	Flandria–Carpenter–Shimano	s.t.
4	Michel Périn (FRA)	Gan–Mercier–Hutchinson	s.t.
5	Charles Rouxel (FRA)	Peugeot–BP–Michelin	s.t.
6	Régis Delépine (FRA)	Gan–Mercier–Hutchinson	s.t.
7	Walter Godefroot (BEL)	Flandria–Carpenter–Shimano	+ 24"
8	Jack Mourioux (FRA)	Gan–Mercier–Hutchinson	s.t.
9	Cyrille Guimard (FRA)	Gan–Mercier–Hutchinson	s.t.
10	Jan Krekels (BEL)	Canada Dry–Gazelle	s.t.

General classification after stage 2b

Rank	Rider	Team	Time
1	Herman Van Springel (BEL)	Rokado–De Gribaldy	9h 07' 21"
2	José Catieau (FRA)	Bic	+ 30"
3	Gerard Vianen (NED)	Gitane–Frigécrème	+ 1' 27"
4	Willy Teirlinck (BEL)	Sonolor	+ 1' 44"
5	Willy De Geest (BEL)	Rokado–De Gribaldy	+ 1' 50"
6	Jürgen Tschan (FRG)	Peugeot–BP–Michelin	+ 1' 56"
7	Eddy Verstraeten (BEL)	Watney–Maes Pils	+ 1' 58"
8	Alain Nogues (FRA)	Gitane–Frigécrème	+ 1' 59"
9	Leif Mortensen (DEN)	Bic	+ 2' 04"
10	Gustaaf Van Cauter (BEL)	Watney–Maes Pils	+ 2' 05"

== Stage 3 ==
3 July 1973 - Roubaix to Reims, 226 km (140 mi)

Stage 3 result

Rank	Rider	Team	Time
1	Cyrille Guimard (FRA)	Gan–Mercier–Hutchinson	5h 41' 54"
2	Staf Van Roosbroeck (BEL)	Rokado–De Gribaldy	s.t.
3	Jack Mourioux (FRA)	Gan–Mercier–Hutchinson	s.t.
4	Régis Delépine (FRA)	Gan–Mercier–Hutchinson	s.t.
5	Juan Zurano (ESP)	La Casera–Bahamontes	s.t.
6	Willy De Geest (BEL)	Rokado–De Gribaldy	s.t.
7	Leif Mortensen (DEN)	Bic	s.t.
8	Luis Ocaña (ESP)	Bic	s.t.
9	José Catieau (FRA)	Bic	s.t.
10	Frans Verbeeck (BEL)	Watney–Maes Pils	+ 2' 34"

General classification after stage 3

Rank	Rider	Team	Time
1	José Catieau (FRA)	Bic	14h 49' 45"
2	Willy De Geest (BEL)	Rokado–De Gribaldy	+ 1' 16"
3	Leif Mortensen (DEN)	Bic	+ 1' 34"
4	Cyrille Guimard (FRA)	Gan–Mercier–Hutchinson	+ 1' 43"
5	Luis Ocaña (ESP)	Bic	+ 1' 59"
6	Herman Van Springel (BEL)	Rokado–De Gribaldy	+ 2' 04"
7	Jack Mourioux (FRA)	Gan–Mercier–Hutchinson	+ 2' 19"
8	Juan Zurano (ESP)	La Casera–Bahamontes	+ 2' 27"
9	Staf Van Roosbroeck (BEL)	Rokado–De Gribaldy	+ 2' 31"
10	Régis Delépine (FRA)	Gan–Mercier–Hutchinson	+ 2' 35"

== Stage 4 ==
4 July 1973 - Reims to Nancy, 214 km (133 mi)

Stage 4 result

Rank	Rider	Team	Time
1	Joop Zoetemelk (NED)	Gitane–Frigécrème	6h 09' 42"
2	Frans Verbeeck (BEL)	Watney–Maes Pils	s.t.
3	Herman Van Springel (BEL)	Rokado–De Gribaldy	+ 1"
4	Lucien Van Impe (BEL)	Sonolor	s.t.
5	Raymond Poulidor (FRA)	Gan–Mercier–Hutchinson	s.t.
6	Roger Gilson (LUX)	Rokado–De Gribaldy	+ 9"
7	José Viejo (ESP)	La Casera–Bahamontes	s.t.
8	Charles Rouxel (FRA)	Peugeot–BP–Michelin	+ 12"
9	Willy Van Neste (BEL)	Sonolor	s.t.
10	Cyrille Guimard (FRA)	Gan–Mercier–Hutchinson	s.t.

General classification after stage 4

Rank	Rider	Team	Time
1	José Catieau (FRA)	Bic	20h 59' 39"
2	Willy De Geest (BEL)	Rokado–De Gribaldy	+ 1' 16"
3	Leif Mortensen (DEN)	Bic	+ 1' 34"
4	Cyrille Guimard (FRA)	Gan–Mercier–Hutchinson	+ 1' 41"
5	Herman Van Springel (BEL)	Rokado–De Gribaldy	+ 1' 48"
6	Luis Ocaña (ESP)	Bic	+ 1' 59"
7	Juan Zurano (ESP)	La Casera–Bahamontes	+ 2' 27"
8	Staf Van Roosbroeck (BEL)	Rokado–De Gribaldy	+ 2' 50"
9	Jack Mourioux (FRA)	Gan–Mercier–Hutchinson	+ 3' 13"
10	Régis Delépine (FRA)	Gan–Mercier–Hutchinson	+ 3' 36"

== Stage 5 ==
5 July 1973 - Nancy to Mulhouse, 188 km (117 mi)

Stage 5 result

Rank	Rider	Team	Time
1	Walter Godefroot (BEL)	Flandria–Carpenter–Shimano	5h 12' 19"
2	Cyrille Guimard (FRA)	Gan–Mercier–Hutchinson	s.t.
3	Jan Krekels (BEL)	Canada Dry–Gazelle	s.t.
4	Staf Van Roosbroeck (BEL)	Rokado–De Gribaldy	s.t.
5	Frans Verbeeck (BEL)	Watney–Maes Pils	s.t.
6	Herman Van Springel (BEL)	Rokado–De Gribaldy	s.t.
7	Willy Teirlinck (BEL)	Sonolor	s.t.
8	Mariano Martínez (FRA)	Gan–Mercier–Hutchinson	s.t.
9	Gerard Vianen (NED)	Gitane–Frigécrème	s.t.
10	Roger Gilson (LUX)	Rokado–De Gribaldy	s.t.

General classification after stage 5

Rank	Rider	Team	Time
1	José Catieau (FRA)	Bic	26h 11' 58"
2	Willy De Geest (BEL)	Rokado–De Gribaldy	+ 1' 16"
3	Leif Mortensen (DEN)	Bic	+ 1' 34"
4	Cyrille Guimard (FRA)	Gan–Mercier–Hutchinson	+ 1' 37"
5	Herman Van Springel (BEL)	Rokado–De Gribaldy	+ 1' 48"
6	Luis Ocaña (ESP)	Bic	+ 1' 59"
7	Juan Zurano (ESP)	La Casera–Bahamontes	+ 2' 27"
8	Staf Van Roosbroeck (BEL)	Rokado–De Gribaldy	+ 2' 50"
9	Régis Delépine (FRA)	Gan–Mercier–Hutchinson	+ 3' 36"
10	Joop Zoetemelk (NED)	Gitane–Frigécrème	+ 4' 04"

== Stage 6 ==
6 July 1973 - Mulhouse to Divonne-les-Bains, 244.5 km (151.9 mi)

Stage 6 result

Rank	Rider	Team	Time
1	Jean-Pierre Danguillaume (FRA)	Peugeot–BP–Michelin	6h 53' 02"
2	Walter Godefroot (BEL)	Flandria–Carpenter–Shimano	+ 6"
3	Barry Hoban (GBR)	Gan–Mercier–Hutchinson	s.t.
4	Frans Verbeeck (BEL)	Watney–Maes Pils	s.t.
5	Herman Van Springel (BEL)	Rokado–De Gribaldy	s.t.
6	Staf Van Roosbroeck (BEL)	Rokado–De Gribaldy	s.t.
7	Gerard Vianen (NED)	Gitane–Frigécrème	s.t.
8	Michael Wright (GBR)	Gitane–Frigécrème	s.t.
9	Walter Planckaert (BEL)	Watney–Maes Pils	s.t.
10	Roger Gilson (LUX)	Rokado–De Gribaldy	s.t.

General classification after stage 6

Rank	Rider	Team	Time
1	José Catieau (FRA)	Bic	33h 05' 06"
2	Willy De Geest (BEL)	Rokado–De Gribaldy	+ 1' 16"
3	Leif Mortensen (DEN)	Bic	+ 1' 34"
4	Herman Van Springel (BEL)	Rokado–De Gribaldy	+ 1' 48"
5	Luis Ocaña (ESP)	Bic	+ 1' 59"
6	Juan Zurano (ESP)	La Casera–Bahamontes	+ 2' 27"
7	Staf Van Roosbroeck (BEL)	Rokado–De Gribaldy	+ 2' 50"
8	Joop Zoetemelk (NED)	Gitane–Frigécrème	+ 4' 04"
9	Raymond Poulidor (FRA)	Gan–Mercier–Hutchinson	+ 4' 21"
10	Fernando Mendes (POR)	Flandria–Carpenter–Shimano	+ 4' 25"

== Rest Day 1 ==
7 July 1973 - Divonne-les-Bains

== Stage 7a ==
8 July 1973 - Divonne-les-Bains to Gaillard, 86.5 km (53.7 mi)

Stage 7a result

Rank	Rider	Team	Time
1	Luis Ocaña (ESP)	Bic	2h 20' 39"
2	Mariano Martínez (FRA)	Gan–Mercier–Hutchinson	+ 53"
3	Lucien Van Impe (BEL)	Sonolor	s.t.
4	Bernard Thévenet (FRA)	Peugeot–BP–Michelin	s.t.
5	Pedro Torres (ESP)	La Casera–Bahamontes	s.t.
6	Joop Zoetemelk (NED)	Gitane–Frigécrème	s.t.
7	José Manuel Fuente (ESP)	Kas–Kaskol	s.t.
8	Francisco Galdós (ESP)	Kas–Kaskol	s.t.
9	Raymond Delisle (FRA)	Peugeot–BP–Michelin	s.t.
10	Régis Ovion (FRA)	Peugeot–BP–Michelin	+ 1' 12"

General classification after stage 7a

Rank	Rider	Team	Time
1	Luis Ocaña (ESP)	Bic	35h 27' 44"
2	José Catieau (FRA)	Bic	+ 44"
3	Herman Van Springel (BEL)	Rokado–De Gribaldy	+ 2' 20"
4	Leif Mortensen (DEN)	Bic	+ 2' 46"
5	Joop Zoetemelk (NED)	Gitane–Frigécrème	+ 2' 58"
6	Lucien Van Impe (BEL)	Sonolor	+ 3' 22"
7	Bernard Thévenet (FRA)	Peugeot–BP–Michelin	+ 3' 32"
8	Juan Zurano (ESP)	La Casera–Bahamontes	+ 3' 39"
9	Joaquim Agostinho (POR)	Gan–Mercier–Hutchinson	+ 3' 55"
10	Willy De Geest (BEL)	Rokado–De Gribaldy	+ 4' 15"

== Stage 7b ==
8 July 1973 - Gaillard to Méribel, 150.5 km (93.5 mi)

Stage 7b result

Rank	Rider	Team	Time
1	Bernard Thévenet (FRA)	Peugeot–BP–Michelin	4h 44' 30"
2	Joop Zoetemelk (NED)	Gitane–Frigécrème	+ 8"
3	José Manuel Fuente (ESP)	Kas–Kaskol	+ 10"
4	Lucien Van Impe (BEL)	Sonolor	+ 12"
5	Luis Ocaña (ESP)	Bic	+ 15"
6	Herman Van Springel (BEL)	Rokado–De Gribaldy	+ 50"
7	Francisco Galdós (ESP)	Kas–Kaskol	+ 54"
8	Mariano Martínez (FRA)	Gan–Mercier–Hutchinson	+ 1' 25"
9	Raymond Delisle (FRA)	Peugeot–BP–Michelin	+ 1' 49"
10	Régis Ovion (FRA)	Peugeot–BP–Michelin	s.t.

General classification after stage 7b

Rank	Rider	Team	Time
1	Luis Ocaña (ESP)	Bic	40h 12' 29"
2	Joop Zoetemelk (NED)	Gitane–Frigécrème	+ 2' 51"
3	Herman Van Springel (BEL)	Rokado–De Gribaldy	+ 2' 55"
4	Bernard Thévenet (FRA)	Peugeot–BP–Michelin	+ 3' 17"
5	Lucien Van Impe (BEL)	Sonolor	+ 3' 19"
6	Leif Mortensen (DEN)	Bic	+ 6' 14"
7	Raymond Poulidor (FRA)	Gan–Mercier–Hutchinson	+ 6' 24"
8	Raymond Delisle (FRA)	Peugeot–BP–Michelin	+ 6' 38"
9	José Catieau (FRA)	Bic	+ 7' 04"
10	Michel Périn (FRA)	Gan–Mercier–Hutchinson	+ 7' 24"

== Stage 8 ==
9 July 1973 - Moûtiers to Les Orres, 237.5 km (147.6 mi)

Stage 8 result

Rank	Rider	Team	Time
1	Luis Ocaña (ESP)	Bic	7h 55' 47"
2	José Manuel Fuente (ESP)	Kas–Kaskol	+ 58"
3	Mariano Martínez (FRA)	Gan–Mercier–Hutchinson	+ 6' 57"
4	Bernard Thévenet (FRA)	Peugeot–BP–Michelin	+ 6' 59"
5	Michel Périn (FRA)	Gan–Mercier–Hutchinson	+ 12' 33"
6	Joop Zoetemelk (NED)	Gitane–Frigécrème	+ 20' 24"
7	Raymond Delisle (FRA)	Peugeot–BP–Michelin	s.t.
8	Herman Van Springel (BEL)	Rokado–De Gribaldy	s.t.
9	Vicente López Carril (ESP)	Kas–Kaskol	s.t.
10	René Grelin (FRA)	Gan–Mercier–Hutchinson	s.t.

General classification after stage 8

Rank	Rider	Team	Time
1	Luis Ocaña (ESP)	Bic	48h 08' 16"
2	José Manuel Fuente (ESP)	Kas–Kaskol	+ 9' 08"
3	Bernard Thévenet (FRA)	Peugeot–BP–Michelin	+ 10' 16"
4	Michel Périn (FRA)	Gan–Mercier–Hutchinson	+ 19' 57"
5	Joop Zoetemelk (NED)	Gitane–Frigécrème	+ 23' 15"
6	Herman Van Springel (BEL)	Rokado–De Gribaldy	+ 23' 20"
7	Lucien Van Impe (BEL)	Sonolor	+ 23' 44"
8	Leif Mortensen (DEN)	Bic	+ 26' 39"
9	Raymond Poulidor (FRA)	Gan–Mercier–Hutchinson	+ 26' 55"
10	Raymond Delisle (FRA)	Peugeot–BP–Michelin	+ 27' 03"

== Stage 9 ==
10 July 1973 - Embrun to Nice, 234.5 km (145.7 mi)

Stage 9 result

Rank	Rider	Team	Time
1	Vicente López Carril (ESP)	Kas–Kaskol	8h 20' 29"
2	Frans Verbeeck (BEL)	Watney–Maes Pils	+ 8' 50"
3	Jean-Pierre Danguillaume (FRA)	Peugeot–BP–Michelin	s.t.
4	Herman Van Springel (BEL)	Rokado–De Gribaldy	s.t.
5	Gerard Vianen (NED)	Gitane–Frigécrème	s.t.
6	Charles Rouxel (FRA)	Peugeot–BP–Michelin	s.t.
7	Ronald De Witte (BEL)	Flandria–Carpenter–Shimano	s.t.
8	Fernando Mendes (POR)	Flandria–Carpenter–Shimano	s.t.
9	Joop Zoetemelk (NED)	Gitane–Frigécrème	s.t.
10	Mariano Martínez (FRA)	Gan–Mercier–Hutchinson	s.t.

General classification after stage 9

Rank	Rider	Team	Time
1	Luis Ocaña (ESP)	Bic	56h 37' 35"
2	José Manuel Fuente (ESP)	Kas–Kaskol	+ 9' 08"
3	Bernard Thévenet (FRA)	Peugeot–BP–Michelin	+ 10' 16"
4	Michel Périn (FRA)	Gan–Mercier–Hutchinson	+ 19' 57"
5	Joop Zoetemelk (NED)	Gitane–Frigécrème	+ 23' 15"
6	Herman Van Springel (BEL)	Rokado–De Gribaldy	+ 23' 20"
7	Lucien Van Impe (BEL)	Sonolor	+ 23' 40"
8	Vicente López Carril (ESP)	Kas–Kaskol	+ 24' 12"
9	Leif Mortensen (DEN)	Bic	+ 26' 39"
10	Raymond Poulidor (FRA)	Gan–Mercier–Hutchinson	+ 26' 55"

== Stage 10 ==
11 July 1973 - Nice to Aubagne, 222.5 km (138.3 mi)

Stage 10 result

Rank	Rider	Team	Time
1	Michael Wright (GBR)	Gitane–Frigécrème	7h 18' 34"
2	José Antonio González (ESP)	Kas–Kaskol	s.t.
3	Charles Rouxel (FRA)	Peugeot–BP–Michelin	s.t.
4	José Catieau (FRA)	Bic	s.t.
5	Fernando Mendes (POR)	Flandria–Carpenter–Shimano	+ 36"
6	Joaquim Agostinho (POR)	Gan–Mercier–Hutchinson	+ 1' 59"
7	Willy Van Neste (BEL)	Sonolor	s.t.
8	Michel Pollentier (BEL)	Flandria–Carpenter–Shimano	s.t.
9	René Grelin (FRA)	Gan–Mercier–Hutchinson	s.t.
10	Pedro Torres (ESP)	La Casera–Bahamontes	s.t.

General classification after stage 10

Rank	Rider	Team	Time
1	Luis Ocaña (ESP)	Bic	63h 58' 45"
2	José Manuel Fuente (ESP)	Kas–Kaskol	+ 9' 08"
3	Bernard Thévenet (FRA)	Peugeot–BP–Michelin	+ 10' 16"
4	Michel Périn (FRA)	Gan–Mercier–Hutchinson	+ 19' 57"
5	Joop Zoetemelk (NED)	Gitane–Frigécrème	+ 23' 15"
6	Herman Van Springel (BEL)	Rokado–De Gribaldy	+ 23' 20"
7	Lucien Van Impe (BEL)	Sonolor	+ 23' 40"
8	Vicente López Carril (ESP)	Kas–Kaskol	+ 24' 12"
9	Raymond Poulidor (FRA)	Gan–Mercier–Hutchinson	+ 26' 18"
10	Leif Mortensen (DEN)	Bic	+ 26' 39"
