= 1973 Tour de France, Stage 11 to Stage 20b =

Cycling race stages

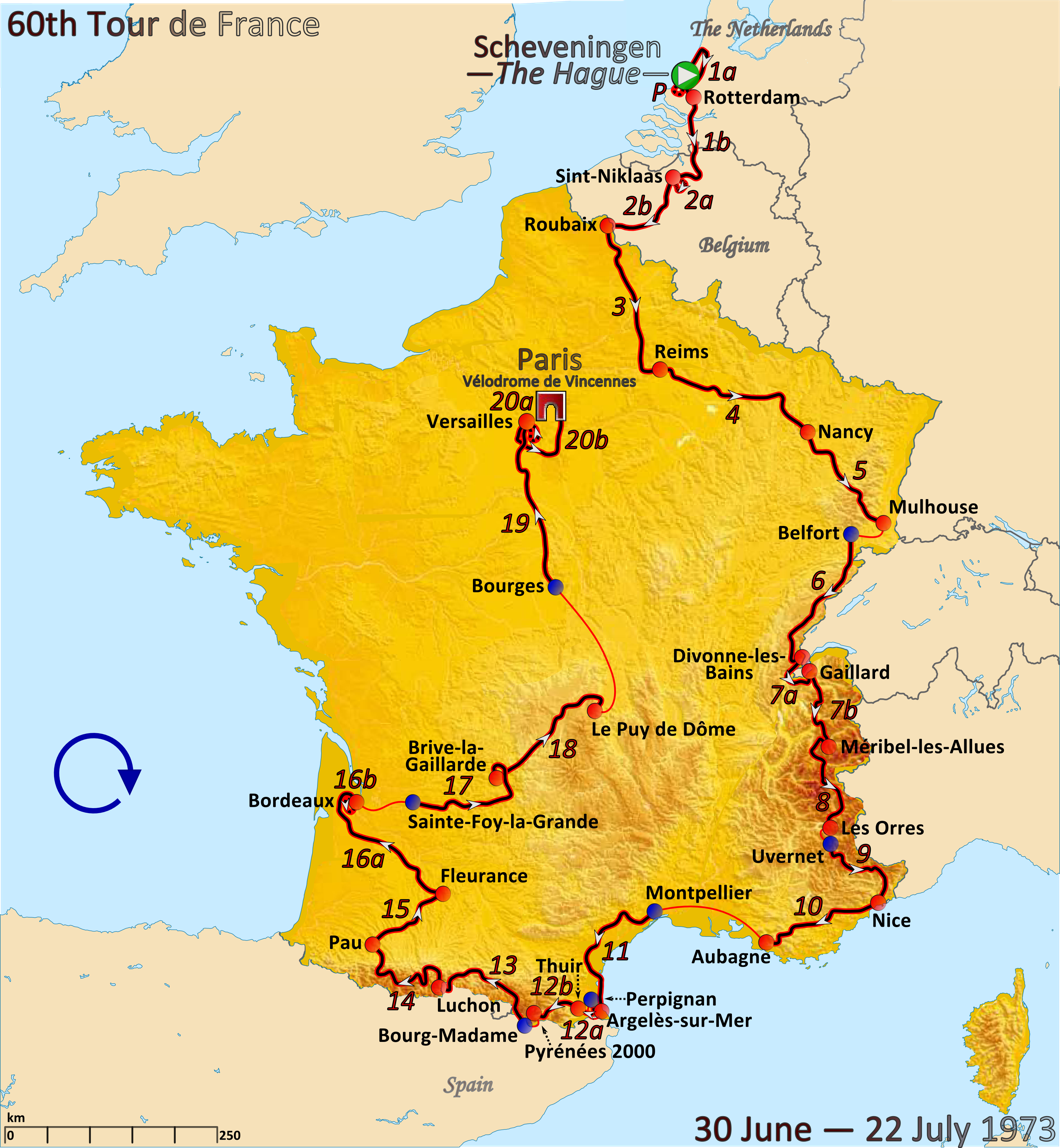
Route of the 1973 Tour de France

The 1973 Tour de France was the 60th edition of Tour de France, one of cycling's Grand Tours. The Tour began in Scheveningen, in the Netherlands, with a prologue individual time trial on 30 June and Stage 11 occurred on 12 July with a flat stage from Montpellier. The race finished in Paris on 22 July.

== Stage 11 ==
12 July 1973 - Montpellier to Argelès-sur-Mer, 238 km (147.9 mi)

Stage 11 result

| Rank | Rider | Team | Time |
|---|---|---|---|
| 1 | Barry Hoban (GBR) | Gan–Mercier–Hutchinson | 7h 45' 21" |
| 2 | Jacques Esclassan (FRA) | Peugeot–BP–Michelin | s.t. |
| 3 | Staf Van Roosbroeck (BEL) | Rokado–De Gribaldy | s.t. |
| 4 | Régis Delépine (FRA) | Gan–Mercier–Hutchinson | s.t. |
| 5 | Walter Godefroot (BEL) | Flandria–Carpenter–Shimano | s.t. |
| 6 | Gerard Vianen (NED) | Gitane–Frigécrème | s.t. |
| 7 | Jan Krekels (BEL) | Canada Dry–Gazelle | s.t. |
| 8 | Gérard Besnard (FRA) | Sonolor | s.t. |
| 9 | Willy Teirlinck (BEL) | Sonolor | s.t. |
| 10 | Frans Verbeeck (BEL) | Watney–Maes Pils | s.t. |

General classification after stage 11

| Rank | Rider | Team | Time |
|---|---|---|---|
| 1 | Luis Ocaña (ESP) | Bic | 71h 44' 06" |
| 2 | José Manuel Fuente (ESP) | Kas–Kaskol | + 9' 08" |
| 3 | Bernard Thévenet (FRA) | Peugeot–BP–Michelin | + 10' 16" |
| 4 | Michel Périn (FRA) | Gan–Mercier–Hutchinson | + 19' 57" |
| 5 | Herman Van Springel (BEL) | Rokado–De Gribaldy | + 23' 09" |
| 6 | Joop Zoetemelk (NED) | Gitane–Frigécrème | s.t. |
| 7 | Lucien Van Impe (BEL) | Sonolor | + 23' 40" |
| 8 | Vicente López Carril (ESP) | Kas–Kaskol | + 24' 12" |
| 9 | Raymond Poulidor (FRA) | Gan–Mercier–Hutchinson | + 26' 18" |
| 10 | Leif Mortensen (DEN) | Bic | + 26' 39" |

== Stage 12a ==
13 July 1973 - Perpignan to Thuir, 28.3 km (17.6 mi) (ITT)

Stage 12a result

| Rank | Rider | Team | Time |
|---|---|---|---|
| 1 | Luis Ocaña (ESP) | Bic | 37' 24" |
| 2 | Raymond Poulidor (FRA) | Gan–Mercier–Hutchinson | + 30" |
| 3 | Joaquim Agostinho (POR) | Gan–Mercier–Hutchinson | + 33" |
| 4 | José Antonio González (ESP) | Kas–Kaskol | + 1' 02" |
| 5 | Jesús Manzaneque (ESP) | La Casera–Bahamontes | + 1' 03" |
| 6 | Charly Grosskost (FRA) | Gan–Mercier–Hutchinson | + 1' 04" |
| 7 | Herman Van Springel (BEL) | Rokado–De Gribaldy | + 1' 26" |
| 8 | Bernard Thévenet (FRA) | Peugeot–BP–Michelin | + 1' 29" |
| 9 | Joop Zoetemelk (NED) | Gitane–Frigécrème | + 1' 32" |
| 10 | Fernando Mendes (POR) | Flandria–Carpenter–Shimano | + 1' 36" |

General classification after stage 12a

| Rank | Rider | Team | Time |
|---|---|---|---|
| 1 | Luis Ocaña (ESP) | Bic | 72h 21' 30" |
| 2 | José Manuel Fuente (ESP) | Kas–Kaskol | + 10' 47" |
| 3 | Bernard Thévenet (FRA) | Peugeot–BP–Michelin | + 11' 45" |
| 4 | Michel Périn (FRA) | Gan–Mercier–Hutchinson | + 22' 26" |
| 5 | Herman Van Springel (BEL) | Rokado–De Gribaldy | + 24' 35" |
| 6 | Joop Zoetemelk (NED) | Gitane–Frigécrème | + 24' 47" |
| 7 | Lucien Van Impe (BEL) | Sonolor | + 26' 01" |
| 8 | Raymond Poulidor (FRA) | Gan–Mercier–Hutchinson | + 26' 48" |
| 9 | Vicente López Carril (ESP) | Kas–Kaskol | + 27' 43" |
| 10 | Leif Mortensen (DEN) | Bic | + 29' 10" |

== Stage 12b ==
13 July 1973 - Thuir to Bolquères Pyrenees 2000, 76 km (47.2 mi)

Stage 12a result

| Rank | Rider | Team | Time |
|---|---|---|---|
| 1 | Lucien Van Impe (BEL) | Sonolor | 2h 35' 02" |
| 2 | Joop Zoetemelk (NED) | Gitane–Frigécrème | + 20" |
| 3 | Luis Ocaña (ESP) | Bic | + 21" |
| 4 | José Manuel Fuente (ESP) | Kas–Kaskol | + 23" |
| 5 | Herman Van Springel (BEL) | Rokado–De Gribaldy | + 32" |
| 6 | Mariano Martínez (FRA) | Gan–Mercier–Hutchinson | + 34" |
| 7 | Joaquim Agostinho (POR) | Gan–Mercier–Hutchinson | s.t. |
| 8 | Pedro Torres (ESP) | La Casera–Bahamontes | s.t. |
| 9 | Francisco Galdós (ESP) | Kas–Kaskol | s.t. |
| 10 | Georges Pintens (BEL) | Rokado–De Gribaldy | s.t. |

General classification after stage 12b

| Rank | Rider | Team | Time |
|---|---|---|---|
| 1 | Luis Ocaña (ESP) | Bic | 74h 56' 53" |
| 2 | José Manuel Fuente (ESP) | Kas–Kaskol | + 10' 49" |
| 3 | Bernard Thévenet (FRA) | Peugeot–BP–Michelin | + 11' 58" |
| 4 | Michel Périn (FRA) | Gan–Mercier–Hutchinson | + 22' 39" |
| 5 | Joop Zoetemelk (NED) | Gitane–Frigécrème | + 24' 42" |
| 6 | Herman Van Springel (BEL) | Rokado–De Gribaldy | + 24' 46" |
| 7 | Lucien Van Impe (BEL) | Sonolor | + 25' 40" |
| 8 | Raymond Poulidor (FRA) | Gan–Mercier–Hutchinson | + 27' 01" |
| 9 | Vicente López Carril (ESP) | Kas–Kaskol | + 27' 56" |
| 10 | Joaquim Agostinho (POR) | Gan–Mercier–Hutchinson | + 30' 11" |

== Rest Day 2 ==
14 July 1973 - Bolquères Pyrenees 2000

== Stage 13 ==
15 July 1973 - Bourg-Madame to Luchon, 235 km (146 mi)

Stage 13 result

| Rank | Rider | Team | Time |
|---|---|---|---|
| 1 | Luis Ocaña (ESP) | Bic | 6h 51' 50" |
| 2 | Joop Zoetemelk (NED) | Gitane–Frigécrème | + 15" |
| 3 | Michel Pollentier (BEL) | Flandria–Carpenter–Shimano | + 3' 34" |
| 4 | Lucien Van Impe (BEL) | Sonolor | s.t. |
| 5 | Bernard Thévenet (FRA) | Peugeot–BP–Michelin | s.t. |
| 6 | Herman Van Springel (BEL) | Rokado–De Gribaldy | + 4' 07" |
| 7 | Pedro Torres (ESP) | La Casera–Bahamontes | s.t. |
| 8 | Mariano Martínez (FRA) | Gan–Mercier–Hutchinson | s.t. |
| 9 | Régis Ovion (FRA) | Peugeot–BP–Michelin | s.t. |
| 10 | Lucien Aimar (FRA) | De Kova–Lejeune | s.t. |

General classification after stage 13

| Rank | Rider | Team | Time |
|---|---|---|---|
| 1 | Luis Ocaña (ESP) | Bic | 81h 48' 39" |
| 2 | José Manuel Fuente (ESP) | Kas–Kaskol | + 14' 56" |
| 3 | Bernard Thévenet (FRA) | Peugeot–BP–Michelin | + 15' 32" |
| 4 | Joop Zoetemelk (NED) | Gitane–Frigécrème | + 24' 57" |
| 5 | Herman Van Springel (BEL) | Rokado–De Gribaldy | + 28' 53" |
| 6 | Michel Périn (FRA) | Gan–Mercier–Hutchinson | + 29' 08" |
| 7 | Lucien Van Impe (BEL) | Sonolor | + 29' 14" |
| 8 | Vicente López Carril (ESP) | Kas–Kaskol | + 32' 03" |
| 9 | Joaquim Agostinho (POR) | Gan–Mercier–Hutchinson | + 34' 18" |
| 10 | Raymond Delisle (FRA) | Peugeot–BP–Michelin | + 34' 56" |

== Stage 14 ==
16 July 1973 - Luchon to Pau, 227.5 km (141.4 mi)

Stage 14 result

| Rank | Rider | Team | Time |
|---|---|---|---|
| 1 | Pedro Torres (ESP) | La Casera–Bahamontes | 7h 10' 41" |
| 2 | Régis Ovion (FRA) | Peugeot–BP–Michelin | + 1' 09" |
| 3 | Michel Périn (FRA) | Gan–Mercier–Hutchinson | + 1' 11" |
| 4 | Luis Balagué (ESP) | La Casera–Bahamontes | s.t. |
| 5 | Michel Pollentier (BEL) | Flandria–Carpenter–Shimano | + 2' 11" |
| 6 | Antoon Houbrechts (BEL) | Rokado–De Gribaldy | s.t. |
| 7 | Jean-Pierre Danguillaume (FRA) | Peugeot–BP–Michelin | + 2' 15" |
| 8 | Herman Van Springel (BEL) | Rokado–De Gribaldy | + 3' 07" |
| 9 | Joop Zoetemelk (NED) | Gitane–Frigécrème | s.t. |
| 10 | Mariano Martínez (FRA) | Gan–Mercier–Hutchinson | s.t. |

General classification after stage 14

| Rank | Rider | Team | Time |
|---|---|---|---|
| 1 | Luis Ocaña (ESP) | Bic | 89h 02' 31" |
| 2 | José Manuel Fuente (ESP) | Kas–Kaskol | + 14' 56" |
| 3 | Bernard Thévenet (FRA) | Peugeot–BP–Michelin | + 15' 32" |
| 4 | Joop Zoetemelk (NED) | Gitane–Frigécrème | + 24' 57" |
| 5 | Michel Périn (FRA) | Gan–Mercier–Hutchinson | + 27' 12" |
| 6 | Herman Van Springel (BEL) | Rokado–De Gribaldy | + 28' 53" |
| 7 | Lucien Van Impe (BEL) | Sonolor | + 29' 14" |
| 8 | Vicente López Carril (ESP) | Kas–Kaskol | + 32' 03" |
| 9 | Régis Ovion (FRA) | Peugeot–BP–Michelin | + 34' 04" |
| 10 | Joaquim Agostinho (POR) | Gan–Mercier–Hutchinson | + 34' 18" |

== Stage 15 ==
17 July 1973 - Pau to Fleurance, 137 km (85 mi)

Stage 15 result

| Rank | Rider | Team | Time |
|---|---|---|---|
| 1 | Wilfried David (BEL) | Flandria–Carpenter–Shimano | 3h 44' 34" |
| 2 | Marc Demeyer (BEL) | Flandria–Carpenter–Shimano | + 18" |
| 3 | Gerard Vianen (NED) | Gitane–Frigécrème | s.t. |
| 4 | André Mollet (FRA) | Peugeot–BP–Michelin | s.t. |
| 5 | Jean-Pierre Genet (FRA) | Gan–Mercier–Hutchinson | s.t. |
| 6 | Ronald De Witte (BEL) | Flandria–Carpenter–Shimano | s.t. |
| 7 | Jesús Esperanza (ESP) | La Casera–Bahamontes | s.t. |
| 8 | Raymond Riotte (FRA) | Sonolor | + 24" |
| 9 | Jacques Esclassan (FRA) | Peugeot–BP–Michelin | + 29" |
| 10 | Herman Van Springel (BEL) | Rokado–De Gribaldy | s.t. |

General classification after stage 15

| Rank | Rider | Team | Time |
|---|---|---|---|
| 1 | Luis Ocaña (ESP) | Bic | 92h 47' 34" |
| 2 | José Manuel Fuente (ESP) | Kas–Kaskol | + 14' 56" |
| 3 | Bernard Thévenet (FRA) | Peugeot–BP–Michelin | + 15' 32" |
| 4 | Joop Zoetemelk (NED) | Gitane–Frigécrème | + 24' 57" |
| 5 | Michel Périn (FRA) | Gan–Mercier–Hutchinson | + 27' 12" |
| 6 | Herman Van Springel (BEL) | Rokado–De Gribaldy | + 28' 53" |
| 7 | Lucien Van Impe (BEL) | Sonolor | + 29' 14" |
| 8 | Vicente López Carril (ESP) | Kas–Kaskol | + 32' 03" |
| 9 | Régis Ovion (FRA) | Peugeot–BP–Michelin | + 34' 04" |
| 10 | Joaquim Agostinho (POR) | Gan–Mercier–Hutchinson | + 34' 18" |

== Stage 16a ==
18 July 1973 - Fleurance to Bordeaux, 210 km (130 mi)

Stage 16a result

| Rank | Rider | Team | Time |
|---|---|---|---|
| 1 | Walter Godefroot (BEL) | Flandria–Carpenter–Shimano | 6h 23' 50" |
| 2 | Jacques Esclassan (FRA) | Peugeot–BP–Michelin | s.t. |
| 3 | Daniel Ducreux (FRA) | Flandria–Carpenter–Shimano | s.t. |
| 4 | Staf Van Roosbroeck (BEL) | Rokado–De Gribaldy | s.t. |
| 5 | Christian Blain (FRA) | De Kova–Lejeune | s.t. |
| 6 | Charly Grosskost (FRA) | Gan–Mercier–Hutchinson | s.t. |
| 7 | Mariano Martínez (FRA) | Gan–Mercier–Hutchinson | s.t. |
| 8 | Herman Van Springel (BEL) | Rokado–De Gribaldy | s.t. |
| 9 | Régis Delépine (FRA) | Gan–Mercier–Hutchinson | s.t. |
| 10 | Marc Demeyer (BEL) | Flandria–Carpenter–Shimano | s.t. |

General classification after stage 16a

| Rank | Rider | Team | Time |
|---|---|---|---|
| 1 | Luis Ocaña (ESP) | Bic | 99h 11' 24" |
| 2 | José Manuel Fuente (ESP) | Kas–Kaskol | + 14' 56" |
| 3 | Bernard Thévenet (FRA) | Peugeot–BP–Michelin | + 15' 32" |
| 4 | Joop Zoetemelk (NED) | Gitane–Frigécrème | + 24' 57" |
| 5 | Michel Périn (FRA) | Gan–Mercier–Hutchinson | + 27' 12" |
| 6 | Herman Van Springel (BEL) | Rokado–De Gribaldy | + 28' 53" |
| 7 | Lucien Van Impe (BEL) | Sonolor | + 29' 14" |
| 8 | Vicente López Carril (ESP) | Kas–Kaskol | + 32' 03" |
| 9 | Régis Ovion (FRA) | Peugeot–BP–Michelin | + 33' 58" |
| 10 | Joaquim Agostinho (POR) | Gan–Mercier–Hutchinson | + 34' 18" |

== Stage 16b ==
18 July 1973 - Bordeaux, 12.4 km (7.7 mi) (ITT)

Stage 16b result

| Rank | Rider | Team | Time |
|---|---|---|---|
| 1 | Joaquim Agostinho (POR) | Gan–Mercier–Hutchinson | 16' 23" |
| 2 | Bernard Thévenet (FRA) | Peugeot–BP–Michelin | + 1" |
| 3 | Joop Zoetemelk (NED) | Gitane–Frigécrème | + 3" |
| 4 | Luis Ocaña (ESP) | Bic | + 12" |
| 5 | José Antonio González (ESP) | Kas–Kaskol | + 15" |
| 6 | Jesús Manzaneque (ESP) | La Casera–Bahamontes | + 17" |
| 7 | Charly Grosskost (FRA) | Gan–Mercier–Hutchinson | + 20" |
| 8 | Pedro Torres (ESP) | La Casera–Bahamontes | + 25" |
| 9 | Lucien Van Impe (BEL) | Sonolor | s.t. |
| 10 | Herman Van Springel (BEL) | Rokado–De Gribaldy | + 26" |

General classification after stage 16b

| Rank | Rider | Team | Time |
|---|---|---|---|
| 1 | Luis Ocaña (ESP) | Bic | 99h 27' 59" |
| 2 | Bernard Thévenet (FRA) | Peugeot–BP–Michelin | + 15' 21" |
| 3 | José Manuel Fuente (ESP) | Kas–Kaskol | + 15' 22" |
| 4 | Joop Zoetemelk (NED) | Gitane–Frigécrème | + 24' 48" |
| 5 | Michel Périn (FRA) | Gan–Mercier–Hutchinson | + 27' 50" |
| 6 | Herman Van Springel (BEL) | Rokado–De Gribaldy | + 29' 07" |
| 7 | Lucien Van Impe (BEL) | Sonolor | + 29' 27" |
| 8 | Vicente López Carril (ESP) | Kas–Kaskol | + 32' 53" |
| 9 | Joaquim Agostinho (POR) | Gan–Mercier–Hutchinson | + 34' 06" |
| 10 | Régis Ovion (FRA) | Peugeot–BP–Michelin | + 34' 22" |

== Stage 17 ==
19 July 1973 - Sainte-Foy-la-Grande to Brive-la-Gaillarde, 248 km (154 mi)

Stage 17 result

| Rank | Rider | Team | Time |
|---|---|---|---|
| 1 | Claude Tollet (FRA) | Sonolor | 6h 34' 45" |
| 2 | Roland Berland (FRA) | Bic | s.t. |
| 3 | Fernando Mendes (POR) | Flandria–Carpenter–Shimano | s.t. |
| 4 | Barry Hoban (GBR) | Gan–Mercier–Hutchinson | + 4' 27" |
| 5 | Régis Delépine (FRA) | Gan–Mercier–Hutchinson | s.t. |
| 6 | Jack Mourioux (FRA) | Gan–Mercier–Hutchinson | s.t. |
| 7 | Walter Godefroot (BEL) | Flandria–Carpenter–Shimano | s.t. |
| 8 | Marc Demeyer (BEL) | Flandria–Carpenter–Shimano | s.t. |
| 9 | Jan Krekels (BEL) | Canada Dry–Gazelle | s.t. |
| 10 | Herman Van Springel (BEL) | Rokado–De Gribaldy | s.t. |

General classification after stage 17

| Rank | Rider | Team | Time |
|---|---|---|---|
| 1 | Luis Ocaña (ESP) | Bic | 106h 07' 11" |
| 2 | Bernard Thévenet (FRA) | Peugeot–BP–Michelin | + 15' 21" |
| 3 | José Manuel Fuente (ESP) | Kas–Kaskol | + 15' 22" |
| 4 | Joop Zoetemelk (NED) | Gitane–Frigécrème | + 24' 48" |
| 5 | Michel Périn (FRA) | Gan–Mercier–Hutchinson | + 27' 50" |
| 6 | Herman Van Springel (BEL) | Rokado–De Gribaldy | + 29' 07" |
| 7 | Lucien Van Impe (BEL) | Sonolor | + 29' 27" |
| 8 | Vicente López Carril (ESP) | Kas–Kaskol | + 32' 53" |
| 9 | Joaquim Agostinho (POR) | Gan–Mercier–Hutchinson | + 34' 06" |
| 10 | Régis Ovion (FRA) | Peugeot–BP–Michelin | + 34' 22" |

== Stage 18 ==
20 July 1973 - Brive-la-Gaillarde to Puy de Dôme, 216.5 km (134.5 mi)

Stage 18 result

| Rank | Rider | Team | Time |
|---|---|---|---|
| 1 | Luis Ocaña (ESP) | Bic | 6h 36' 21" |
| 2 | Lucien Van Impe (BEL) | Sonolor | + 4" |
| 3 | Bernard Thévenet (FRA) | Peugeot–BP–Michelin | + 20" |
| 4 | José Manuel Fuente (ESP) | Kas–Kaskol | + 34" |
| 5 | Joop Zoetemelk (NED) | Gitane–Frigécrème | + 53" |
| 6 | Raymond Delisle (FRA) | Peugeot–BP–Michelin | + 54" |
| 7 | Joaquim Agostinho (POR) | Gan–Mercier–Hutchinson | + 55" |
| 8 | Francisco Galdós (ESP) | Kas–Kaskol | + 1' 02" |
| 9 | Pedro Torres (ESP) | La Casera–Bahamontes | + 1' 19" |
| 10 | Régis Ovion (FRA) | Peugeot–BP–Michelin | + 1' 22" |

General classification after stage 18

| Rank | Rider | Team | Time |
|---|---|---|---|
| 1 | Luis Ocaña (ESP) | Bic | 112h 43' 32" |
| 2 | Bernard Thévenet (FRA) | Peugeot–BP–Michelin | + 15' 41" |
| 3 | José Manuel Fuente (ESP) | Kas–Kaskol | + 15' 56" |
| 4 | Joop Zoetemelk (NED) | Gitane–Frigécrème | + 25' 41" |
| 5 | Lucien Van Impe (BEL) | Sonolor | + 29' 27" |
| 6 | Herman Van Springel (BEL) | Rokado–De Gribaldy | + 30' 55" |
| 7 | Michel Périn (FRA) | Gan–Mercier–Hutchinson | + 31' 11" |
| 8 | Vicente López Carril (ESP) | Kas–Kaskol | + 34' 25" |
| 9 | Joaquim Agostinho (POR) | Gan–Mercier–Hutchinson | + 35' 01" |
| 10 | Régis Ovion (FRA) | Peugeot–BP–Michelin | + 35' 44" |

== Stage 19 ==
21 July 1973 - Bourges to Versailles, 233.5 km (145.1 mi)

Stage 19 result

| Rank | Rider | Team | Time |
|---|---|---|---|
| 1 | Barry Hoban (GBR) | Gan–Mercier–Hutchinson | 6h 59' 28" |
| 2 | Jack Mourioux (FRA) | Gan–Mercier–Hutchinson | s.t. |
| 3 | Daniel Ducreux (FRA) | Flandria–Carpenter–Shimano | s.t. |
| 4 | Jan Krekels (BEL) | Canada Dry–Gazelle | s.t. |
| 5 | Jacques Esclassan (FRA) | Peugeot–BP–Michelin | s.t. |
| 6 | Gerard Vianen (NED) | Gitane–Frigécrème | s.t. |
| 7 | Albert Van Vlierberghe (BEL) | Rokado–De Gribaldy | s.t. |
| 8 | Walter Godefroot (BEL) | Flandria–Carpenter–Shimano | s.t. |
| 9 | Gérard Besnard (FRA) | Sonolor | s.t. |
| 10 | Régis Delépine (FRA) | Gan–Mercier–Hutchinson | s.t. |

General classification after stage 19

| Rank | Rider | Team | Time |
|---|---|---|---|
| 1 | Luis Ocaña (ESP) | Bic | 119h 43' 00" |
| 2 | Bernard Thévenet (FRA) | Peugeot–BP–Michelin | + 15' 41" |
| 3 | José Manuel Fuente (ESP) | Kas–Kaskol | + 15' 56" |
| 4 | Joop Zoetemelk (NED) | Gitane–Frigécrème | + 25' 41" |
| 5 | Lucien Van Impe (BEL) | Sonolor | + 29' 27" |
| 6 | Herman Van Springel (BEL) | Rokado–De Gribaldy | + 30' 55" |
| 7 | Michel Périn (FRA) | Gan–Mercier–Hutchinson | + 31' 11" |
| 8 | Vicente López Carril (ESP) | Kas–Kaskol | + 34' 25" |
| 9 | Joaquim Agostinho (POR) | Gan–Mercier–Hutchinson | + 35' 01" |
| 10 | Régis Ovion (FRA) | Peugeot–BP–Michelin | + 35' 44" |

== Stage 20a ==
22 July 1973 - Versailles, 16 km (9.9 mi) (ITT)

Stage 20a result

| Rank | Rider | Team | Time |
|---|---|---|---|
| 1 | Luis Ocaña (ESP) | Bic | 20' 57" |
| 2 | Bernard Thévenet (FRA) | Peugeot–BP–Michelin | + 25" |
| 3 | Joop Zoetemelk (NED) | Gitane–Frigécrème} | + 41" |
| 4 | Joaquim Agostinho (POR) | Gan–Mercier–Hutchinson | + 50" |
| 5 | Lucien Van Impe (BEL) | Sonolor | + 53" |
| 6 | Charly Grosskost (FRA) | Gan–Mercier–Hutchinson | + 56" |
| 7 | Jesús Manzaneque (ESP) | La Casera–Bahamontes | + 1' 05" |
| 8 | Herman Van Springel (BEL) | Rokado–De Gribaldy | + 1' 06" |
| 9 | Régis Ovion (FRA) | Peugeot–BP–Michelin | + 1' 15" |
| 10 | Jean-Claude Genty (FRA) | Bic | + 1' 18" |

General classification after stage 20a

| Rank | Rider | Team | Time |
|---|---|---|---|
| 1 | Luis Ocaña (ESP) | Bic | 120h 03' 57" |
| 2 | Bernard Thévenet (FRA) | Peugeot–BP–Michelin | + 16' 06" |
| 3 | José Manuel Fuente (ESP) | Kas–Kaskol | + 17' 15" |
| 4 | Joop Zoetemelk (NED) | Gitane–Frigécrème | + 26' 22" |
| 5 | Lucien Van Impe (BEL) | Sonolor | + 30' 20" |
| 6 | Herman Van Springel (BEL) | Rokado–De Gribaldy | + 32' 01" |
| 7 | Michel Périn (FRA) | Gan–Mercier–Hutchinson | + 33' 02" |
| 8 | Joaquim Agostinho (POR) | Gan–Mercier–Hutchinson | + 35' 51" |
| 9 | Vicente López Carril (ESP) | Kas–Kaskol | + 36' 18" |
| 10 | Régis Ovion (FRA) | Peugeot–BP–Michelin | + 36' 59" |

== Stage 20b ==
22 July 1973 - Versailles to Paris, 89 km (55 mi)

Stage 20b result

| Rank | Rider | Team | Time |
|---|---|---|---|
| 1 | Bernard Thévenet (FRA) | Peugeot–BP–Michelin | 6h 59' 28" |
| 2 | Walter Godefroot (BEL) | Flandria–Carpenter–Shimano | s.t. |
| 3 | Jan Krekels (BEL) | Canada Dry–Gazelle | s.t. |
| 4 | Jacques Esclassan (FRA) | Peugeot–BP–Michelin | s.t. |
| 5 | Régis Ovion (FRA) | Peugeot–BP–Michelin | s.t. |
| 6 | Charles Rouxel (FRA) | Peugeot–BP–Michelin | s.t. |
| 7 | Daniel Ducreux (FRA) | Flandria–Carpenter–Shimano | s.t. |
| 8 | Gerard Vianen (NED) | Gitane–Frigécrème | s.t. |
| 9 | Lucien Aimar (FRA) | De Kova–Lejeune | s.t. |
| 10 | Alfred Gaida (FRG) | Rokado–De Gribaldy | s.t. |

General classification after stage 20b

| Rank | Rider | Team | Time |
|---|---|---|---|
| 1 | Luis Ocaña (ESP) | Bic | 122h 25' 34" |
| 2 | Bernard Thévenet (FRA) | Peugeot–BP–Michelin | + 15' 51" |
| 3 | José Manuel Fuente (ESP) | Kas–Kaskol | + 17' 15" |
| 4 | Joop Zoetemelk (NED) | Gitane–Frigécrème | + 26' 22" |
| 5 | Lucien Van Impe (BEL) | Sonolor | + 30' 20" |
| 6 | Herman Van Springel (BEL) | Rokado–De Gribaldy | + 32' 01" |
| 7 | Michel Périn (FRA) | Gan–Mercier–Hutchinson | + 33' 02" |
| 8 | Joaquim Agostinho (POR) | Gan–Mercier–Hutchinson | + 35' 51" |
| 9 | Vicente López Carril (ESP) | Kas–Kaskol | + 36' 18" |
| 10 | Régis Ovion (FRA) | Peugeot–BP–Michelin | + 36' 59" |
