= 1973 Tour de France =

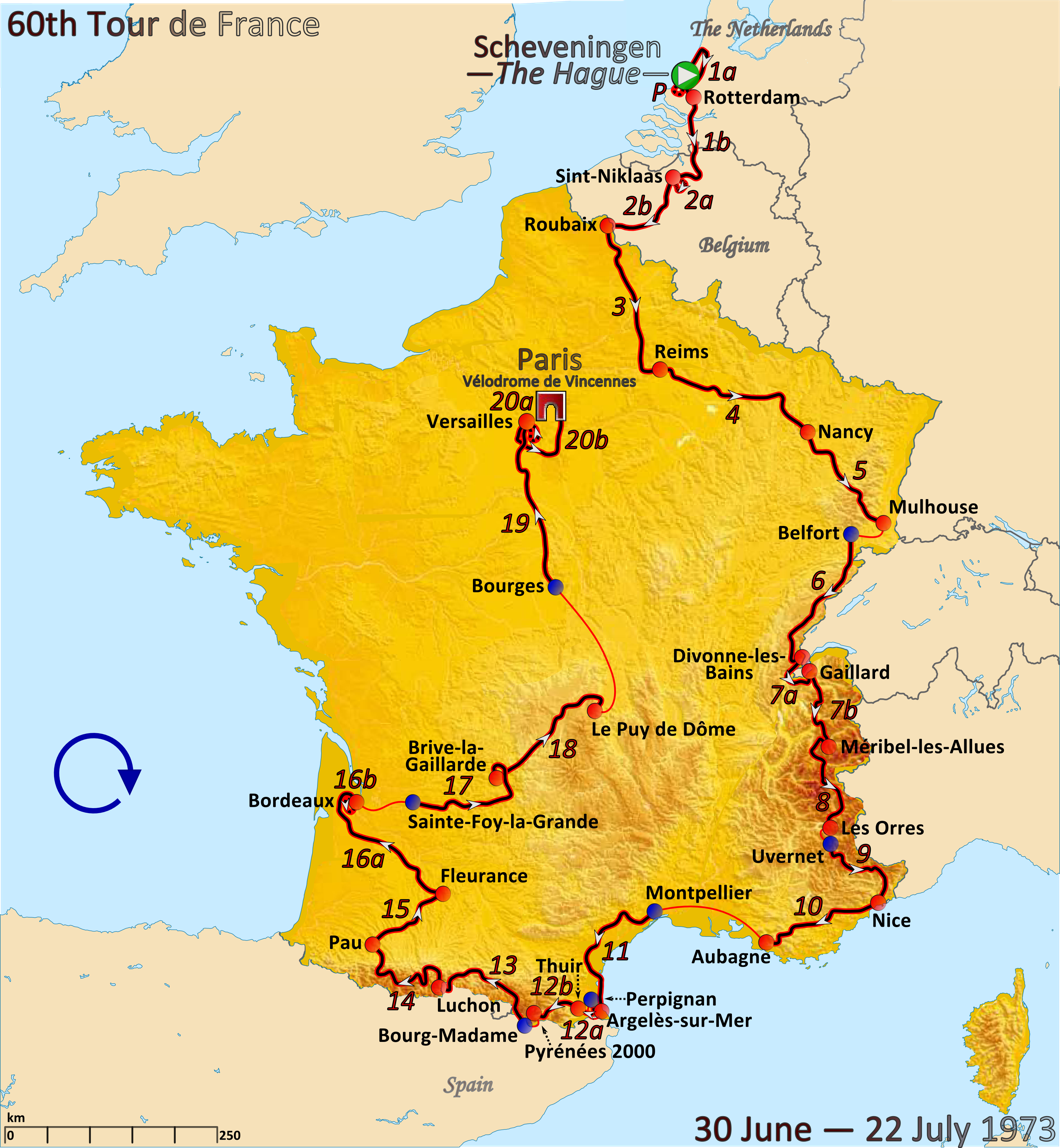
- Route of the 1973 Tour de France

Race details
- Dates: 30 June – 22 July 1973
- Stages: 20 + Prologue, including six split stages
- Distance: 4,090 km (2,540 mi)
- Winning time: 122h 25' 34"

Results
Jersey awarded to the overall winner	Winner	Luis Ocaña (ESP)	(Bic)
	Second	Bernard Thévenet (FRA)	(Peugeot–BP–Michelin)
	Third	José Manuel Fuente (ESP)	(Kas–Kaskol)
Jersey awarded to the points classification winner	Points	Herman Van Springel (BEL)	(Rokado–De Gribaldy)
	Mountains	Pedro Torres (ESP)	(La Casera–Peña Bahamontes)
Jersey awarded to the combination classification winner	Combination	Joop Zoetemelk (NED)	(Gitane–Frigécrème)
	Sprints	Marc Demeyer (BEL)	(Flandria–Carpenter–Shimano)
	Combativity	Luis Ocaña (ESP)	(Bic)
	Team	Bic	
	Team points	Gan–Mercier–Hutchinson	

The 1973 Tour de France was the 60th edition of the Tour de France, one of cycling's Grand Tours. It took place between 30 June and 22 July, with 20 stages covering a distance of 4,090 km (2,541 mi). Eddy Merckx, winner of the previous four editions, did not start the 1973 Tour, partly to avoid angry French fans and partly to please his sponsor; instead he rode and won the 1973 Vuelta a España and the 1973 Giro d'Italia. In his absence, Luis Ocaña dominated the race by winning four mountain stages and two time trials. The result being a margin of victory exceeding 15 minutes.

In 1973, a new team classification was added: the team points classification, calculated by adding the three best stage rankings per team; it would be calculated until 1988.

== Teams ==
The Italian teams did not join the 1973 Tour de France, because no top French cyclist rode the 1973 Giro d'Italia. The Tour started with 12 teams, each with 11 cyclists.

The teams entering the race were:

- Gan–Mercier–Hutchinson
- Sonolor
- Flandria–Carpenter–Shimano
- Peugeot–BP–Michelin
- Bic
- Watney–Maes Pils
- Rokado–De Gribaldy
- Gitane–Frigécrème
- Canada Dry–Gazelle
- De Kova–Lejeune
- Kas–Kaskol
- La Casera–Peña Bahamontes

== Pre-race favourites ==
The winner of the previous four editions, Eddy Merckx had changed sponsors to the Italian Molteni. His contract said that he had to start in the 1973 Vuelta a España and the 1973 Giro d'Italia, and Merckx thought it was impossible to start in three grand tours in one year, so he stayed away from the Tour. Ocaña, who was in great shape, was now the main favourite, with Fuente, Poulidor and Thévenet as his biggest threats. Ocaña was not the clear favourite; he had already crashed out of the Tour three times, and he was seen as fragile. Zoetemelk had changed teams, because he did not have the full support of his team leader. Among the Italian riders absent were world champion Marino Basso and former Tour winner Felice Gimondi.

== Route and stages ==
After the 1972 Tour de France, there were rumours that the 1973 Tour would become easier, to suit French cyclist Cyrille Guimard better. However, when the 1973 Tour route was announced in December 1972, the organisation had included three more mountains compared to 1972. The race started on 30 June, and had two rest days, in Divonne-les-Bains and Bolquères Pyrenees 2000. The highest point of elevation in the race was 2,556 m (8,386 ft) at the summit tunnel of the Col du Galibier mountain pass on stage 8.

Stage characteristics and winners
Stage	Date	Course	Distance	Type	Winner
P	30 June	Scheveningen (Netherlands)	7.1 km (4.4 mi)	Individual time trial	Joop Zoetemelk (NED)
1a	1 July	Scheveningen (Netherlands) to Rotterdam (Netherlands)	84 km (52 mi)	Plain stage	Willy Teirlinck (BEL)
1b	1 July	Rotterdam (Netherlands) to Sint-Niklaas (Belgium)	137.5 km (85.4 mi)	Plain stage	José Catieau (FRA)
2a	2 July	Sint-Niklaas (Belgium)	12.4 km (7.7 mi)	Team time trial	(Belgium) Watney–Maes Pils
2b	2 July	Sint-Niklaas (Belgium) to Roubaix	138 km (86 mi)	Plain stage	Eddy Verstraeten (BEL)
3	3 July	Roubaix to Reims	226 km (140 mi)	Plain stage	Cyrille Guimard (FRA)
4	4 July	Reims to Nancy	214 km (133 mi)	Plain stage	Joop Zoetemelk (NED)
5	5 July	Nancy to Mulhouse	188 km (117 mi)	Stage with mountain(s)	Walter Godefroot (BEL)
6	6 July	Mulhouse to Divonne-les-Bains	244.5 km (151.9 mi)	Stage with mountain(s)	Jean-Pierre Danguillaume (FRA)
	7 July	Divonne-les-Bains		Rest day	
7a	8 July	Divonne-les-Bains to Gaillard	86.5 km (53.7 mi)	Stage with mountain(s)	Luis Ocaña (ESP)
7b	8 July	Gaillard to Méribel	150.5 km (93.5 mi)	Stage with mountain(s)	Bernard Thévenet (FRA)
8	9 July	Moûtiers to Les Orres	237.5 km (147.6 mi)	Stage with mountain(s)	Luis Ocaña (ESP)
9	10 July	Embrun to Nice	234.5 km (145.7 mi)	Stage with mountain(s)	Vicente López Carril (ESP)
10	11 July	Nice to Aubagne	222.5 km (138.3 mi)	Stage with mountain(s)	Michael Wright (GBR)
11	12 July	Montpellier to Argelès-sur-Mer	238 km (148 mi)	Plain stage	Barry Hoban (GBR)
12a	13 July	Perpignan to Thuir	28.3 km (17.6 mi)	Individual time trial	Luis Ocaña (ESP)
12b	13 July	Thuir to Bolquères Pyrenees 2000	76 km (47 mi)	Stage with mountain(s)	Lucien Van Impe (BEL)
	14 July	Bolquères Pyrenees 2000		Rest day	
13	15 July	Bourg-Madame to Luchon	235 km (146 mi)	Stage with mountain(s)	Luis Ocaña (ESP)
14	16 July	Luchon to Pau	227.5 km (141.4 mi)	Stage with mountain(s)	Pedro Torres (ESP)
15	17 July	Pau to Fleurance	137 km (85 mi)	Plain stage	Wilfried David (BEL)
16a	18 July	Fleurance to Bordeaux	210 km (130 mi)	Plain stage	Walter Godefroot (BEL)
16b	18 July	Bordeaux	12.4 km (7.7 mi)	Individual time trial	Joaquim Agostinho (POR)
17	19 July	Sainte-Foy-la-Grande to Brive-la-Gaillarde	248 km (154 mi)	Plain stage	Claude Tollet (FRA)
18	20 July	Brive-la-Gaillarde to Puy de Dôme	216.5 km (134.5 mi)	Stage with mountain(s)	Luis Ocaña (ESP)
19	21 July	Bourges to Versailles	233.5 km (145.1 mi)	Plain stage	Barry Hoban (GBR)
20a	22 July	Versailles	16 km (9.9 mi)	Individual time trial	Luis Ocaña (ESP)
20b	22 July	Versailles to Paris	89 km (55 mi)	Plain stage	Bernard Thévenet (FRA)
	Total		4,090 km (2,541 mi)		

== Race overview ==
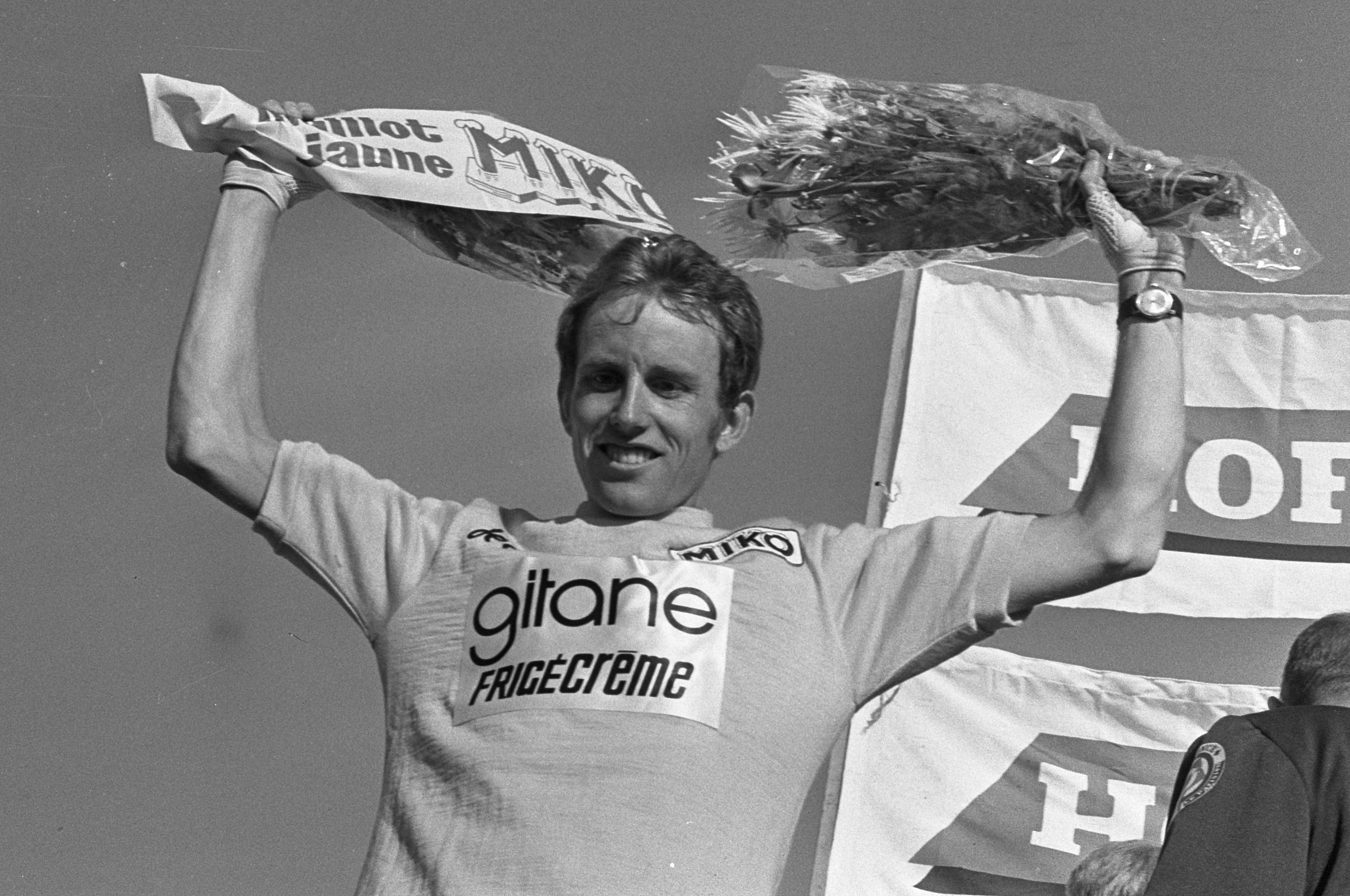
Joop Zoetemelk after he won the opening prologue time trial in Scheveningen, Netherlands

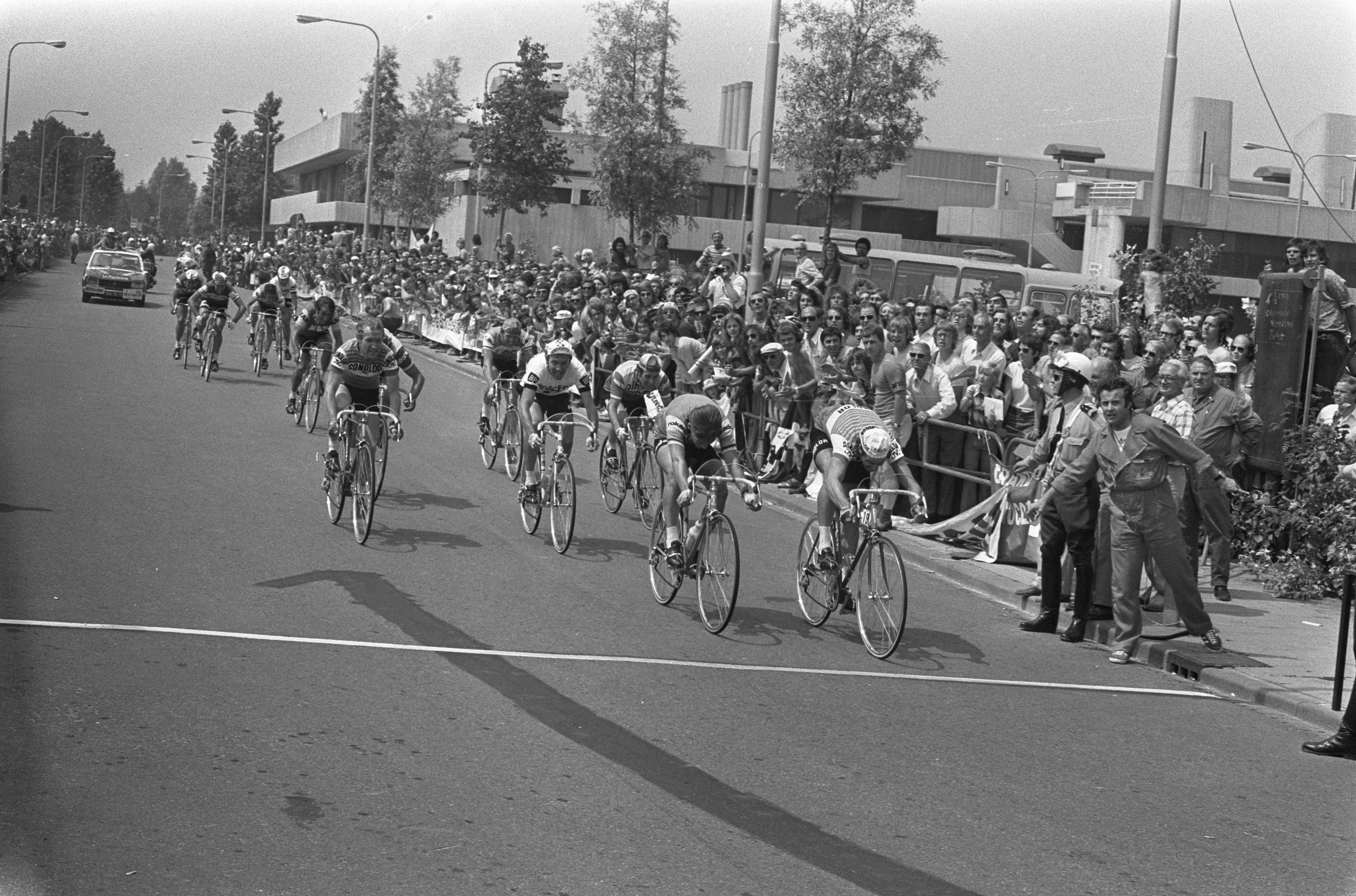
The finish of stage 1a in Rotterdam, Netherlands, won by Willy Teirlinck

Zoetemelk won the opening prologue, one second ahead of Poulidor. In the first part of the next stage, Teirlinck won and took over the lead. Ocaña and Herman Van Springel fell down when a dog crossed the road, but both suffered no serious damage. In the second part of that stage, Van Springel bridged the gap to Catieau, who had escaped. Van Springel did all the work to stay away, while Catieau did not help his team captain's rival. They stayed away until the end of the stage, where Catieau won the sprint, and Van Springel became the new race leader.

In the third stage, a group with Guimard and Ocana escaped. Van Springel, Zoetemelk, Fuentes, Thévenet and Poulidor were not in that group, and had to chase them. The group stayed away, Guimard won the sprint and Catieau became the race leader. More important for the final result was that Ocaña won more than two minutes on Zoetemelk, and more than seven minutes on Fuente.

In stage seven, when the first mountains were climbed, Ocaña attacked, and only Zoetemelk could follow. A few kilometers from the summit, Zoetemelk had to let Ocaña go, and Ocaña finished solo. Ocaña became the new race leader, almost three minutes ahead of Zoetemelk. In the eighth stage, Ocaña and Fuente both attacked. Ocaña and Fuente did not like each other, and when Fuente stopped working, Ocaña was angry, especially when Fuente passed him just before the top of the Izoard to steal the points for the mountain classification. When Fuente had a flat tire, Ocaña did not wait for him, and left him behind, beating him by one minute at the finish line. All the others were far behind: Thévenet and Martinez followed after seven minutes, the other pre-race favourites after twenty minutes.

In the thirteenth stage, Poulidor crashed, and was taken away with a helicopter. In the sixteenth stage, the cyclists were slower than expected, and finished one hour after the latest time schedule. The train that they should have taken had already left, and they had to use buses.

In the time trial in stage 17, Fuente lost his second place in the general classification to Thévenet. Fuente tried to take it back in the mountain stage 18, but he failed and even lost some time.

=== Doping ===
Three cyclists tested positive during the 1973 Tour de France: Barry Hoban, after the 9th stage; Claude Baud, after the 13th stage; and Michel Roques, after the 18th stage. All three received a fine of 1000 Swiss Francs, one-month suspension and ten minutes penalty time in the general classification.

== Classification leadership and minor prizes ==
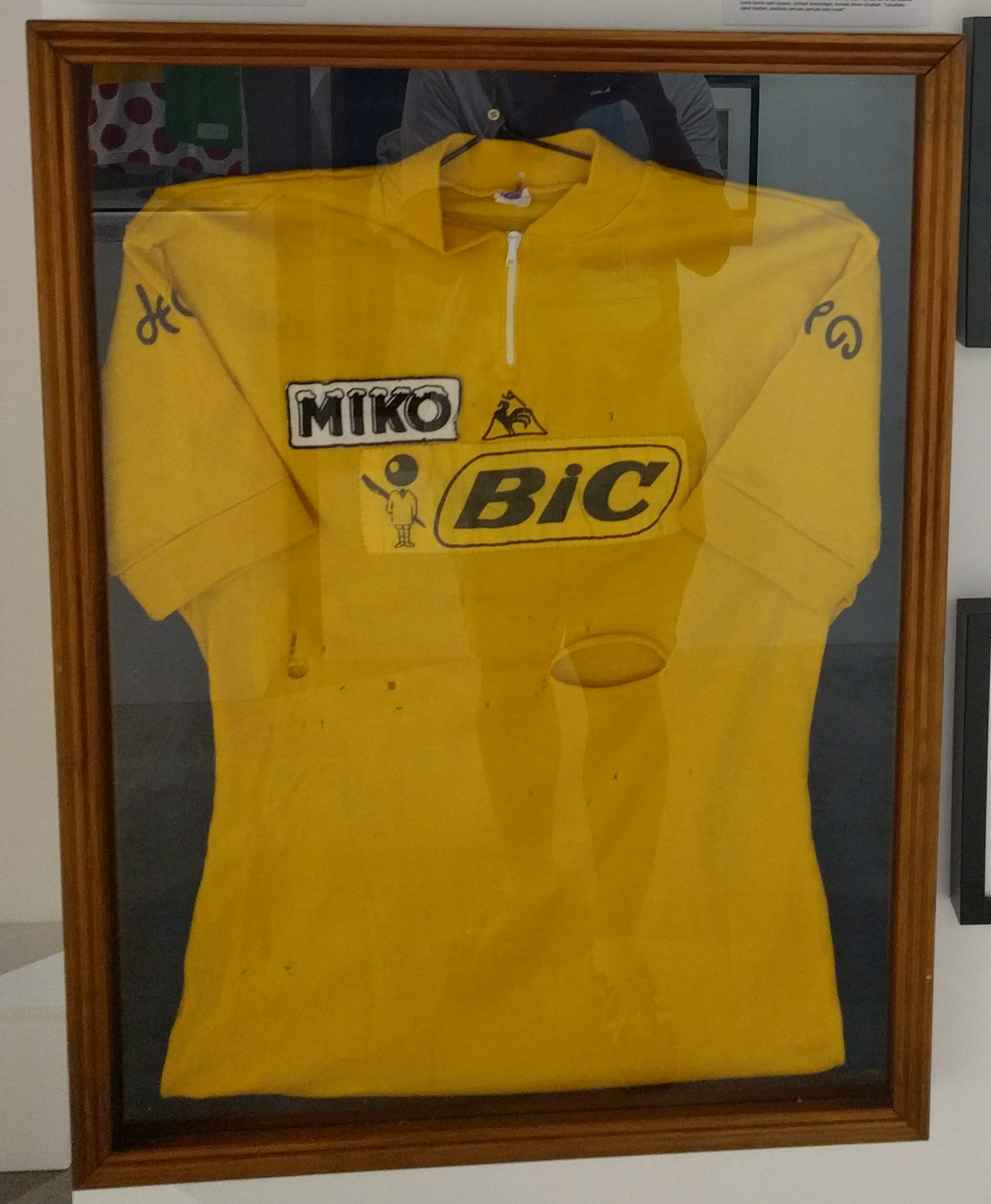
Luis Ocaña's yellow jersey of the 1973 Tour

There were several classifications in the 1973 Tour de France, three of them awarding jerseys to their leaders. The most important was the general classification, calculated by adding each cyclist's finishing times on each stage. The cyclist with the least accumulated time was the race leader, identified by the yellow jersey; the winner of this classification is considered the winner of the Tour.

Additionally, there was a points classification, where cyclists got points for finishing among the best in a stage finish, or in intermediate sprints. The cyclist with the most points lead the classification, and was identified with a green jersey.

There was also a mountains classification. The organisation had categorised some climbs as either first, second, third, or fourth-category; points for this classification were won by the first cyclists that reached the top of these climbs first, with more points available for the higher-categorised climbs. The cyclist with the most points lead the classification, but was not identified with a jersey in 1973.

Another classification was the combination classification. This classification was calculated as a combination of the other classifications, its leader wore the white jersey.

The fifth individual classification was the intermediate sprints classification. This classification had similar rules as the points classification, but only points were awarded on intermediate sprints. In 1973, this classification had no associated jersey.

For the team classification, the times of the best three cyclists per team on each stage were added; the leading team was the team with the lowest total time. The riders in the team that led this classification were identified by yellow caps. For the first time, there was also a team points classification. Cyclists received points according to their finishing position on each stage, with the first rider receiving one point. The first three finishers of each team had their points combined, and the team with the fewest points led the classification. The riders of the team leading this classification wore green caps.

In addition, there was a combativity award, in which a jury composed of journalists gave points after certain stages to the cyclist they considered most combative. The split stages each had a combined winner. At the conclusion of the Tour, Luis Ocaña won the overall super-combativity award, also decided by journalists. The Souvenir Henri Desgrange was given to the first rider to pass the memorial to Tour founder Henri Desgrange near the summit of the Col du Galibier on stage 8. This prize was won by Ocaña.

Classification leadership by stage
Stage	Winner	General classification	Points classification	Mountains classification (Note: No jersey was awarded to the leader of the mountains classification until a white jersey with red polka dots was introduced in 1975.)	Combination classification	Intermediate sprints classification	Team classifications		Combativity award	Elegant award	Amiable award
Stage	Winner	General classification	Points classification	Mountains classification	Combination classification	Intermediate sprints classification	By time	By points	Combativity award	Elegant award	Amiable award
P	Joop Zoetemelk	Joop Zoetemelk	Joop Zoetemelk	no award	no award	no award	Gan–Mercier–Hutchinson	Gan–Mercier–Hutchinson	no award	no award	no award
1a	Willy Teirlinck	Willy Teirlinck	Willy Teirlinck	no award	Willy Teirlinck	Willy Teirlinck	Sonolor	Sonolor	José Catieau	Ludo Delcroix	Jan Krekels
1b	José Catieau	Herman Van Springel	Herman Van Springel	no award	Willy Teirlinck	Willy Teirlinck	Bic	Rokado–De Gribaldy	José Catieau	Ludo Delcroix	Jan Krekels
2a	Watney–Maes Pils	Herman Van Springel	Herman Van Springel	no award	Willy Teirlinck	Willy Teirlinck	Bic	Rokado–De Gribaldy	Tino Tabak	Willy Teirlinck	Joël Millard
2b	Eddy Verstraeten	Herman Van Springel	Herman Van Springel	Frans Verbeeck	Willy Teirlinck	Marc Demeyer	Bic	Rokado–De Gribaldy	Tino Tabak	Willy Teirlinck	Joël Millard
3	Cyrille Guimard	José Catieau	Cyrille Guimard	Willy De Geest	Willy De Geest	Marc Demeyer	Bic	Rokado–De Gribaldy	Luis Ocaña	Jean-Pierre Danguillaume	José Catieau
4	Joop Zoetemelk	José Catieau	Herman Van Springel	Willy De Geest	Willy De Geest	Marc Demeyer	Bic	Rokado–De Gribaldy	Antonio Menéndez	Michel Périn	Jean-Claude Blocher
5	Walter Godefroot	José Catieau	Herman Van Springel	Charly Grosskost	Willy De Geest	Marc Demeyer	Bic	Rokado–De Gribaldy	Charly Grosskost	Willy Abbeloos	Juan Zurano
6	Jean-Pierre Danguillaume	José Catieau	Herman Van Springel	Pedro Torres	Willy De Geest	Marc Demeyer	Bic	Rokado–De Gribaldy	Raymond Riotte	Lucien Aimar	Georges Pintens
7a	Luis Ocaña	Luis Ocaña	Herman Van Springel	Pedro Torres	Willy De Geest	Marc Demeyer	Bic	Gan–Mercier–Hutchinson	Walter Godefroot	Leif Mortensen	Gérard Moneyron
7b	Bernard Thévenet	Luis Ocaña	Herman Van Springel	Pedro Torres	Lucien Van Impe	Marc Demeyer	Bic	Gan–Mercier–Hutchinson	Walter Godefroot	Leif Mortensen	Gérard Moneyron
8	Luis Ocaña	Luis Ocaña	Herman Van Springel	Luis Ocaña	Lucien Van Impe	Marc Demeyer	Bic	Gan–Mercier–Hutchinson	Luis Ocaña	Michael Wright	Pedro Torres
9	Vicente López Carril	Luis Ocaña	Herman Van Springel	José Manuel Fuente	José Manuel Fuente	Marc Demeyer	Bic	Gan–Mercier–Hutchinson	Vicente López Carril	Yves Hézard	Bernard Thévenet
10	Michael Wright	Luis Ocaña	Herman Van Springel	José Manuel Fuente	José Manuel Fuente	Marc Demeyer	Bic	Gan–Mercier–Hutchinson	Raymond Riotte	Roger Gilson	Joaquim Agostinho
11	Barry Hoban	Luis Ocaña	Herman Van Springel	José Manuel Fuente	Joop Zoetemelk	Marc Demeyer	Bic	Gan–Mercier–Hutchinson	no award	Jean-Claude Largeau	Jean-Jacques Sanquer
12a	Luis Ocaña	Luis Ocaña	Herman Van Springel	José Manuel Fuente	Joop Zoetemelk	Marc Demeyer	Bic	Gan–Mercier–Hutchinson	Lucien Van Impe	Jacques Esclassan	Michel Pollentier
12b	Lucien Van Impe	Luis Ocaña	Herman Van Springel	José Manuel Fuente	Joop Zoetemelk	Marc Demeyer	Bic	Gan–Mercier–Hutchinson	Lucien Van Impe	Jacques Esclassan	Michel Pollentier
13	Luis Ocaña	Luis Ocaña	Herman Van Springel	José Manuel Fuente	Joop Zoetemelk	Marc Demeyer	Bic	Gan–Mercier–Hutchinson	Joop Zoetemelk	Bernard Labourdette	Vicente López Carril
14	Pedro Torres	Luis Ocaña	Herman Van Springel	José Manuel Fuente	Joop Zoetemelk	Marc Demeyer	Bic	Gan–Mercier–Hutchinson	Joop Zoetemelk	Jack Mourioux	Raymond Riotte
15	Wilfried David	Luis Ocaña	Herman Van Springel	José Manuel Fuente	Joop Zoetemelk	Marc Demeyer	Bic	Gan–Mercier–Hutchinson	Wilfried David	Daniel Ducreux	René Grelin
16a	Walter Godefroot	Luis Ocaña	Herman Van Springel	José Manuel Fuente	Joop Zoetemelk	Marc Demeyer	Bic	Gan–Mercier–Hutchinson	Bernard Thévenet	Régis Ovion	Herman Van Springel
16b	Joaquim Agostinho	Luis Ocaña	Herman Van Springel	José Manuel Fuente	Joop Zoetemelk	Marc Demeyer	Bic	Gan–Mercier–Hutchinson	Bernard Thévenet	Régis Ovion	Herman Van Springel
17	Claude Tollet	Luis Ocaña	Herman Van Springel	Pedro Torres	Joop Zoetemelk	Marc Demeyer	Bic	Gan–Mercier–Hutchinson	Jacques-André Hochart	Jürgen Tschan	Michel Roques
18	Luis Ocaña	Luis Ocaña	Herman Van Springel	Pedro Torres	Joop Zoetemelk	Marc Demeyer	Bic	Gan–Mercier–Hutchinson	Jean-Claude Blocher	Lucien Van Impe	Ferdinand Julien
19	Barry Hoban	Luis Ocaña	Herman Van Springel	Pedro Torres	Joop Zoetemelk	Marc Demeyer	Bic	Gan–Mercier–Hutchinson	Marc Demeyer	Johny Schleck	Christian Blain
20a	Luis Ocaña	Luis Ocaña	Herman Van Springel	Pedro Torres	Joop Zoetemelk	Marc Demeyer	Bic	Gan–Mercier–Hutchinson	Bernard Thévenet	Luis Ocaña	Guy Santy
20b	Bernard Thévenet	Luis Ocaña	Herman Van Springel	Pedro Torres	Joop Zoetemelk	Marc Demeyer	Bic	Gan–Mercier–Hutchinson	Bernard Thévenet	Luis Ocaña	Guy Santy
Final		Luis Ocaña	Herman Van Springel	Pedro Torres	Joop Zoetemelk	Marc Demeyer	Bic	Gan–Mercier–Hutchinson	Luis Ocaña	Michel Périn	Willy Teirlinck

== Final standings ==
Legend
A yellow jersey.	Denotes the winner of the general classification	A green jersey.	Denotes the winner of the points classification
A white jersey.	Denotes the winner of the combination classification		

=== General classification ===
Final general classification (1–10)
Rank	Rider	Team	Time
1	Luis Ocaña (ESP)	Bic	122h 25' 34"
2	Bernard Thévenet (FRA)	Peugeot–BP–Michelin	+ 15' 51"
3	José Manuel Fuente (ESP)	Kas–Kaskol	+ 17' 15"
4	Joop Zoetemelk (NED)	Gitane–Frigécrème	+ 26' 22"
5	Lucien Van Impe (BEL)	Sonolor	+ 30' 20"
6	Herman Van Springel (BEL)	Rokado–De Gribaldy	+ 32' 01"
7	Michel Périn (FRA)	Gan–Mercier–Hutchinson	+ 33' 02"
8	Joaquim Agostinho (POR)	Bic	+ 35' 51"
9	Vicente López Carril (ESP)	Kas–Kaskol	+ 36' 18"
10	Régis Ovion (FRA)	Peugeot–BP–Michelin	+ 36' 59"

Final general classification (11–87)
Rank	Rider	Team	Time
11	Raymond Delisle (FRA)	Peugeot–BP–Michelin	+ 37' 43"
12	Mariano Martínez (FRA)	Gan–Mercier–Hutchinson	+ 40' 49"
13	Pedro Torres (ESP)	La Casera–Peña Bahamontes	+ 47' 30"
14	José Catieau (FRA)	Bic	+ 49' 12"
15	Antonio Martos (ESP)	Kas–Kaskol	+ 49' 20"
16	Antoon Houbrechts (BEL)	Rokado–De Gribaldy	+ 49' 38"
17	Lucien Aimar (FRA)	De Kova–Lejeune	+ 49' 54"
18	Fernando Mendes (POR)	Flandria–Carpenter–Shimano	+ 51' 22"
19	Leif Mortensen (DEN)	Bic	+ 52' 18"
20	Francisco Galdós (ESP)	Kas–Kaskol	+ 53' 05"
21	Bernard Labourdette (FRA)	Bic	+ 1h 04' 49"
22	Jean-Pierre Danguillaume (FRA)	Peugeot–BP–Michelin	+ 1h 08' 41"
23	Luis Zubero (ESP)	Kas–Kaskol	+ 1h 18' 49"
24	Ronald De Witte (BEL)	Flandria–Carpenter–Shimano	+ 1h 19' 18"
25	Luis Balagué (ESP)	La Casera–Peña Bahamontes	+ 1h 20' 11"
26	René Grelin (FRA)	Gan–Mercier–Hutchinson	+ 1h 20' 33"
27	Jean-Claude Genty (FRA)	Bic	+ 1h 21' 06"
28	Roland Berland (FRA)	Bic	+ 1h 22' 07"
29	Santiago Lazcano (ESP)	Kas–Kaskol	+ 1h 25' 27"
30	Pierre Martelozzo (FRA)	Peugeot–BP–Michelin	+ 1h 27' 51"
31	Alain Santy (FRA)	Bic	+ 1h 29' 19"
32	Johny Schleck (LUX)	Bic	+ 1h 34' 06"
33	José Martíns (POR)	Canada Dry–Gazelle	+ 1h 34' 36"
34	Michel Pollentier (BEL)	Flandria–Carpenter–Shimano	+ 1h 36' 03"
35	Raymond Martin (FRA)	Gitane–Frigécrème	+ 1h 36' 10"
36	Charly Rouxel (FRA)	Peugeot–BP–Michelin	+ 1h 47' 42"
37	Jurgen Tschan (FRG)	Peugeot–BP–Michelin	+ 1h 49' 20"
38	Dámaso Torres (ESP)	La Casera–Peña Bahamontes	+ 1h 49' 23"
39	Jesús Manzaneque (ESP)	La Casera–Peña Bahamontes	+ 1h 51' 40"
40	Antonio Menéndez (ESP)	Kas–Kaskol	+ 1h 55' 58"
41	Carlos Melero (ESP)	Kas–Kaskol	+ 1h 58' 07"
42	Ferdinand Julien (FRA)	Gitane–Frigécrème	+ 2h 01' 12"
43	Barry Hoban (GBR)	Gan–Mercier–Hutchinson	+ 2h 03' 00"
44	Marcel Boishardy (FRA)	De Kova–Lejeune	+ 2h 03' 38"
45	Herculano Oliveira (POR)	Canada Dry–Gazelle	+ 2h 05' 13"
46	Jean-Pierre Genet (FRA)	Gan–Mercier–Hutchinson	+ 2h 07' 14"
47	José Antonio González (ESP)	Kas–Kaskol	+ 2h 08' 07"
48	Claude Tollet (FRA)	Sonolor	+ 2h 09' 04"
49	Jean-Claude Largeau (FRA)	Gitane–Frigécrème	+ 2h 09' 22"
50	José Grande (ESP)	Kas–Kaskol	+ 2h 09' 40"
51	Michel Roques (FRA)	Sonolor	+ 2h 10' 41"
52	Albert Van Vlierberghe (BEL)	Rokado–De Gribaldy	+ 2h 13' 02"
53	Sylvain Vasseur (FRA)	Bic	+ 2h 13' 56"
54	Jesus Esperanza (ESP)	La Casera–Peña Bahamontes	+ 2h 14' 49"
55	Daniel Ducreux (FRA)	Flandria–Carpenter–Shimano	+ 2h 15' 21"
56	Robert Bouloux (FRA)	Peugeot–BP–Michelin	+ 2h 15' 55"
57	Michael Wright (GBR)	Gitane–Frigécrème	+ 2h 23' 21"
58	Christian Blain (FRA)	De Kova–Lejeune	+ 2h 23' 35"
59	Gerard Vianen (NED)	Gitane–Frigécrème	+ 2h 24' 21"
60	Willy Teirlinck (BEL)	Sonolor	+ 2h 24' 44"
61	Gérard Besnard (FRA)	Sonolor	+ 2h 28' 25"
62	Jean-Jacques Sanquer (FRA)	Flandria–Carpenter–Shimano	+ 2h 29' 05"
63	Alain Nogues (FRA)	Gitane–Frigécrème	+ 2h 33' 41"
64	Joaquim Andrade (POR)	Gitane–Frigécrème	+ 2h 34' 07"
65	Walter Godefroot (BEL)	Flandria–Carpenter–Shimano	+ 2h 34' 49"
66	Gustaaf Van Roosbroeck (BEL)	Rokado–De Gribaldy	+ 2h 38' 02"
67	Charly Grosskost (FRA)	Gan–Mercier–Hutchinson	+ 2h 38' 43"
68	Jacques Esclassan (FRA)	Peugeot–BP–Michelin	+ 2h 42' 03"
69	André Mollet (FRA)	Peugeot–BP–Michelin	+ 2h 43' 05"
70	Theo van der Leeuw (NED)	Canada Dry–Gazelle	+ 2h 43' 38"
71	Jacques Botherel (FRA)	Sonolor	+ 2h 45' 45"
72	Marc Demeyer (BEL)	Flandria–Carpenter–Shimano	+ 2h 46' 08"
73	Francis Campaner (FRA)	Gitane–Frigécrème	+ 2h 47' 21"
74	Wilfried David (BEL)	Flandria–Carpenter–Shimano	+ 2h 50' 33"
75	Jan Krekels (NED)	Canada Dry–Gazelle	+ 2h 54' 39"
76	Jacques Mourioux (FRA)	Gan–Mercier–Hutchinson	+ 2h 59' 21"
77	Guy Santy (FRA)	Bic	+ 3h 01' 19"
78	Raymond Riotte (FRA)	Sonolor	+ 3h 04' 24"
79	Gérard Moneyron (FRA)	Gan–Mercier–Hutchinson	+ 3h 05' 20"
80	Robert Mintkiewicz (FRA)	Sonolor	+ 3h 07' 58"
81	Alf Gaida (FRG)	Rokado–De Gribaldy	+ 3h 32' 23"
82	Régis Delépine (FRA)	Gan–Mercier–Hutchinson	+ 3h 14' 21"
83	Charles Genthon (FRA)	De Kova–Lejeune	+ 3h 42' 20"
84	Noël Geneste (FRA)	De Kova–Lejeune	+ 4h 17' 31"
85	Jean-Claude Baud (FRA)	De Kova–Lejeune	+ 4h 33' 09"
86	Jean-Claude Blocher (FRA)	De Kova–Lejeune	+ 4h 36' 56"
87	Jacques Hochart (FRA)	De Kova–Lejeune	+ 4h 51' 09"

=== Points classification ===
Final points classification (1–10)
Rank	Rider	Team	Points
1	Herman Van Springel (BEL)	Rokado–De Gribaldy	187
2	Joop Zoetemelk (NED)	Gitane–Frigécrème	168
3	Luis Ocaña (ESP)	Bic	145
4	Bernard Thévenet (FRA)	Peugeot–BP–Michelin	139
5	Walter Godefroot (BEL)	Flandria–Carpenter–Shimano	139
6	Barry Hoban (GBR)	Gan–Mercier–Hutchinson	110
7	Gerard Vianen (NED)	Gitane–Frigécrème	110
8	Lucien Van Impe (BEL)	Sonolor	109
9	Mariano Martínez (FRA)	Gan–Mercier–Hutchinson	89
10	Jacques Esclassan (FRA)	Peugeot–BP–Michelin	89

=== Mountains classification ===
Final mountains classification (1–10)
Rank	Rider	Team	Points
1	Pedro Torres (ESP)	La Casera–Peña Bahamontes	225
2	José Manuel Fuente (ESP)	Kas–Kaskol	216
3	Luis Ocaña (ESP)	Bic	192
4	Bernard Thévenet (FRA)	Peugeot–BP–Michelin	119
5	Lucien Van Impe (BEL)	Sonolor	107
6	Joop Zoetemelk (NED)	Gitane–Frigécrème	83
7	Vicente López Carril (ESP)	Kas–Kaskol	80
8	Joaquim Agostinho (POR)	Bic	46
9	Francisco Galdós (ESP)	Kas–Kaskol	46
10	Mariano Martínez (FRA)	Gan–Mercier–Hutchinson	38

=== Combination classification ===
Final combination classification (1–6)
Rank	Rider	Team	Points
1	Joop Zoetemelk (NED)	Gitane–Frigécrème	20
2	Lucien Van Impe (BEL)	Sonolor	26
3	Bernard Thévenet (FRA)	Peugeot–BP–Michelin	33
4	Herman Van Springel (BEL)	Rokado–De Gribaldy	50
5	Fernando Mendes (POR)	Flandria–Carpenter–Shimano	55
6	José Catieau (FRA)	Bic	82

=== Intermediate sprints classification ===
Final intermediate sprints classification (1–10)
Rank	Rider	Team	Points
1	Marc Demeyer (BEL)	Flandria–Carpenter–Shimano	105
2	Barry Hoban (GBR)	Gan–Mercier–Hutchinson	70
3	Willy Teirlinck (BEL)	Sonolor	60
4	Raymond Riotte (FRA)	Sonolor	34
5	Fernando Mendes (POR)	Flandria–Carpenter–Shimano	18
5	Robert Mintkiewicz (FRA)	Sonolor	18
7	Régis Delépine (FRA)	Gan–Mercier–Hutchinson	13
8	Joop Zoetemelk (NED)	Gitane–Frigécrème	12
9	Jacques Esclassan (FRA)	Peugeot–BP–Michelin	11
10	Lucien Van Impe (BEL)	Sonolor	10
10	Vicente López Carril (ESP)	Kas–Kaskol	10

=== Team classification ===
Final team classification (1–10)
Rank	Team	Time
1	Bic	369h 31' 55"
2	Peugeot–BP–Michelin	+ 20' 23"
3	Kas–Kaskol	+ 20' 42"
4	Gan–Mercier–Hutchinson	+ 23' 04"
5	Rokado–De Gribaldy	+ 1h 40' 42"
6	Sonolor	+ 1h 45' 56"
7	Gitane–Frigécrème	+ 1h 58' 57"
8	La Casera–Peña Bahamontes	+ 2h 01' 50"
9	Flandria–Carpenter–Shimano	+ 2h 09' 21"
10	De Kova–Lejeune	+ 3h 09' 21"

=== Team points classification ===
Final team points classification (1–10)
Rank	Team	Points
1	Gan–Mercier–Hutchinson	868
2	Peugeot–BP–Michelin	1171
3	Rokado–De Gribaldy	1554
4	Bic	1565
5	Flandria–Carpenter–Shimano	1596
6	Sonolor	1687
7	Gitane–Frigécrème	1751
8	Kas–Kaskol	1863
9	La Casera–Peña Bahamontes	2338
10	Canada Dry–Gazelle	3217

== Bibliography ==
- Augendre, Jacques (2016). "Guide historique" [Historical guide] (PDF). Tour de France (in French). Paris: Amaury Sport Organisation. Archived (PDF) from the original on 17 August 2016.
- McGann, Bill; McGann, Carol (2008). The Story of the Tour de France: 1965–2007. Vol. 2. Indianapolis: Dog Ear Publishing. ISBN 978-1-59858-608-4.
- Nauright, John; Parrish, Charles (2012). Sports Around the World: History, Culture, and Practice. Vol. 2. Santa Barbara, California: ABC-CLIO. ISBN 978-1-59884-300-2.
- Saunders, David (1973). 1973 Tour de France. Keighley, UK: Kennedy Brothers Publishing. OCLC 500691057.
- van den Akker, Pieter (2018). Tour de France Rules and Statistics: 1903–2018. Self-published. ISBN 978-1-79398-080-9.
