= 1973 Paris–Nice =

Race details
- Dates: 11–17 March 1973
- Stages: 6 + Prologue
- Distance: 855.6 km (531.6 mi)
- Winning time: 21h 11' 45"

Results
Jersey awarded to the overall winner	Winner	Raymond Poulidor (FRA)	(Gan–Mercier–Hutchinson)
	Second	Joop Zoetemelk (NED)	(Gitane–Frigécrème)
	Third	Eddy Merckx (BEL)	(Molteni)

The 1973 Paris–Nice was the 31st edition of the Paris–Nice cycle race and was held from 11 March to 17 March 1973. The race started in Paris and finished in Nice. The race was won by Raymond Poulidor of the Gan team.

== General classification ==
Final general classification

Rank	Rider	Team	Time
1	Raymond Poulidor (FRA)	Gan–Mercier–Hutchinson	21h 11' 45"
2	Joop Zoetemelk (NED)	Gitane–Frigécrème	+ 4"
3	Eddy Merckx (BEL)	Molteni	+ 12"
4	Régis Ovion (FRA)	Peugeot–BP–Michelin	+ 19"
5	Leif Mortensen (DEN)	Bic	+ 27"
6	Luis Ocaña (ESP)	Bic	+ 41"
7	Charly Grosskost (FRA)	Gan–Mercier–Hutchinson	+ 54"
8	Herman Van Springel (BEL)	Rokado–De Gribaldy	+ 1' 00"
9	Raymond Delisle (FRA)	Peugeot–BP–Michelin	+ 1' 13"
10	Yves Hézard (FRA)	Gitane–Frigécrème	+ 1' 42"
