= Tour du Nord =

Road cycling race in Nord-Pas-de-Calais, France

Race details
- Region: France
- Discipline: Road
- Type: Stage race

History
- First edition: 1933
- Editions: 23
- Final edition: 1973
- First winner: Henri Flament (FRA)
- Most wins: Willy Truye (BEL) (2 wins)
- Final winner: Michel Roques (FRA)

The Tour du Nord was a multi-day road cycling race held in Nord-Pas-de-Calais, France between 1933 and 1973.

== Winners ==
Year	Winner	Second	Third
1933	(France) Henri Flament	(Belgium) Albert Vandaele	(France) François Blin
1934	(Belgium) Achiel Dermaux	(Belgium) Noël Declercq	(France) Raymond De Poorter
1935	(Belgium) Georges Christiaens	(Belgium) Jules Pyncket	(France) Arthur Debruyckere
1936	(Belgium) Albertin Disseaux	(Belgium) René Walschot	(Belgium) Edgard De Caluwé
1937	(Belgium) Michel Hermie	(Belgium) Edgard De Caluwé	(Belgium) Noël Declercq
1938	(France) Julien Legrand	(Belgium) Omer Thys	(Belgium) Jerome Dufromont
1939	(Belgium) Jerome Dufromont	(Belgium) Michel Hermie	(Belgium) Omer Thys
1952	(Belgium) Emmanuel Thoma	(Belgium) Jules Renard	(Belgium) André Rosseel
1953	(France) Albert Platel	(Belgium) Michel Vuylsteke	(Belgium) Edgard Sorgeloos
1954	(Belgium) André Rosseel	(Belgium) Florent Rondelé	(France) Antoine Frankowski
1958	(Belgium) Willy Truye	(Belgium) Daniel Denys	(France) Claude Senicourt (Belgium) Gustaaf Van Vaerenbergh
1960	(Belgium) Willy Truye	(Netherlands) Dick Enthoven	(Belgium) Daniel Doom
1961	(Netherlands) Martin van de Borgh	(Belgium) Clément Roman	(Belgium) Louis Troonbeeck
1962	(Belgium) André Messelis	(Belgium) Benoni Beheyt	(Belgium) Frans Melckenbeeck
1963	(Belgium) Jan Nolmans	(Belgium) Georges Vandenberghe	(Belgium) Jozef Huysmans
1964	(Belgium) Jos Huysmans	(Belgium) Guido Reybrouck	(Belgium) Herman Van Springel
1965	(Belgium) Willy van den Eynde	(France) Pierre Beuffeuil	(France) Jean-Claude Lefebvre
1966	(France) Roger Milliot	(Belgium) André Messelis	(Belgium) Jaak De Boever (West Germany) Hans Junkermann
1968	(Netherlands) Harry Steevens	(Belgium) Leopold van den Neste	(Belgium) Jozef Huysmans
1969	(Netherlands) René Pijnen	(Belgium) Georges Pintens	(Belgium) Jozef Huysmans
1970	(Belgium) Raf Hooyberghs	(France) José Catieau	(France) Jean-Marie Leblanc
1972	(France) Sylvain Vasseur	(France) Raymond Riotte	(Belgium) Louis Verreydt
1973	(France) Michel Roques	(France) Robert Mintkiewicz	(France) Guy Sibille
