= Frans Verhaegen =

Belgian cyclist (1948–2026)

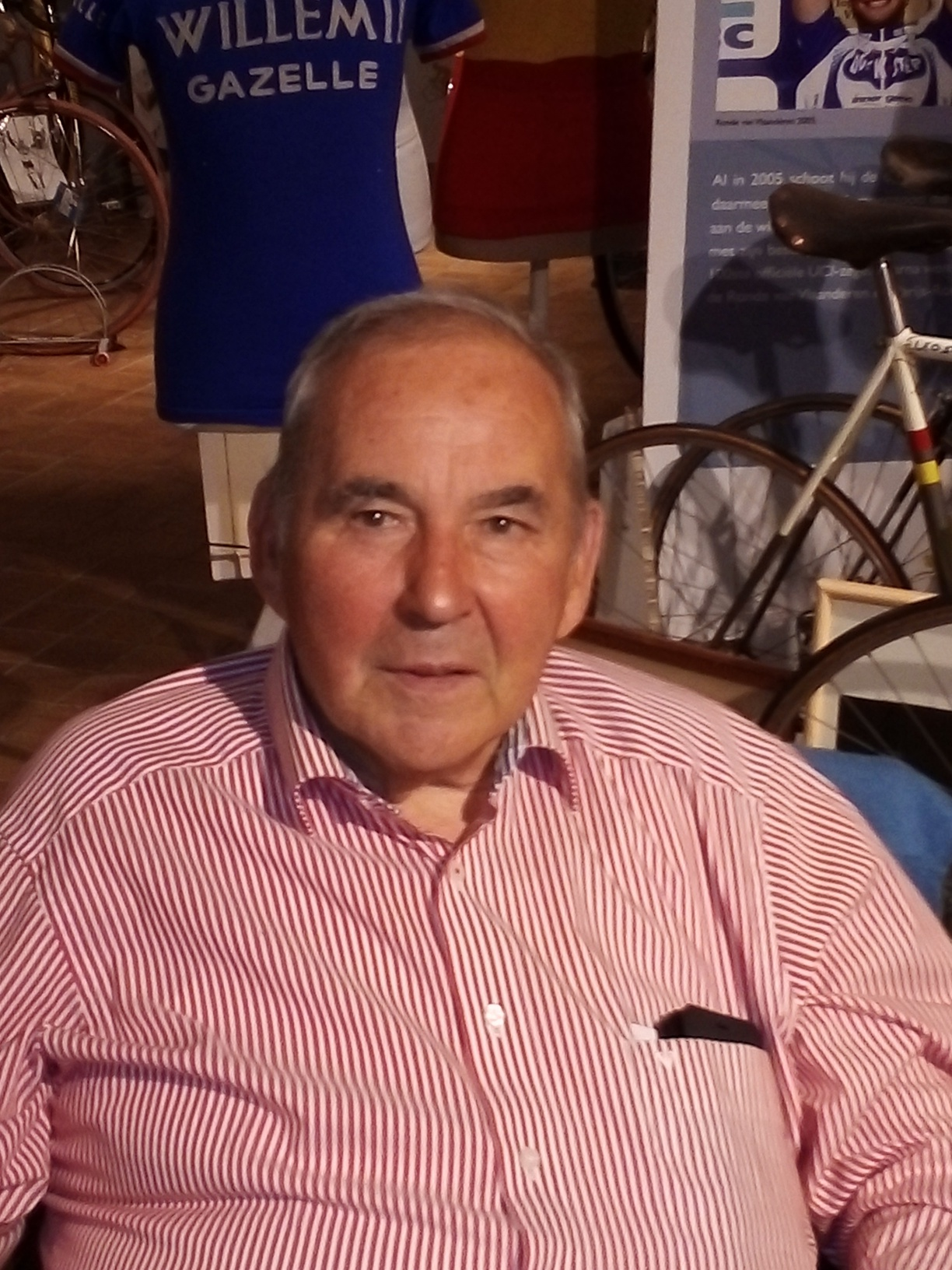

Personal information
- Born: 22 January 1948 Pulle, Belgium
- Died: 8 February 2026 (aged 78)

Cycling career
- Sport: Cycling
- Role: Rider

Amateur team
- 1970: Bic

Professional teams
- 1971: Goldor
- 1972: Hertekamp
- 1972–1975: IJsboerke
- 1976: Flandria-Velda
- 1977: Carpenter–Zeepcentrale–Splendor
- 1978: Marc Zeepcentrale-Superia-ISC
- 1979: Safir-Geuze-Saint-Louis-Ludo

Major wins
- One-day races and Classics Gran Premio Valencia (1970) Kuurne–Brussels–Kuurne (1975, 1976) Kampioenschap van Vlaanderen (1977)

Frans Verhaegen (22 January 1948 – 8 February 2026) was a Belgian professional racing cyclist. He rode in the 1976 Tour de France.

Verhaegen died on 8 February 2026, at the age of 78.

== Major results ==
=== Amateur ===
1970
1st Omloop Het Nieuwsblad Espoirs
1st GP Affligem
1st Kortrijk–Galmaarden
2nd Brussel–Opwijk
3rd Gent–Wevelgem U23

=== Professional ===
1971
1st Clàssica Comunitat Valenciana
2nd Sint-Martens-Lierde
3rd Schaal Sels
3rd Grand Prix de Denain
1972
1st Road race, National Interclubs Championships
3rd Heistse Pijl
3rd Schaal Sels
3rd De Pinte
5th Omloop Mandel-Leie-Schelde
7th Kessel–Lier
1973
2nd Ronde van Limburg
2nd Maaslandse Pijl
3rd Leeuwse Pijl
4th Omloop van Midden-België
5th Bruxelles–Meulebeke
1974
1st Omloop van Midden-België
1st Maaslandse Pijl
2nd Grote 1-MeiPrijs
2nd Grand Prix Betekom
1975
1st GP Momignies
1st Kuurne–Brussels–Kuurne
3rd Ruddervoorde Koerse
5th Dwars door Vlaanderen
6th Grand Prix Impanis-Van Petegem
1976
1st Kuurne–Brussels–Kuurne
2nd Circuit de Neeroeteren
3rd Grote Prijs Stad Sint-Niklaas
4rd Sint-Martens-Lierde
4rd Circuit de Niel]]
1977
1st Kampioenschap van Vlaanderen
2nd Circuit de Niel
3rd Overall Omloop Mandel-Leie-Schelde
4th Nokere Koerse
4th Dwars door West-Vlaanderen
7th Schaal Sels
8th Dwars door Vlaanderen
1978
2nd Circuit des Frontières
2nd Omloop van Midden-België
4th Maaslandse Pijl
5th De Kustpijl
8th Grand Prix Pino Cerami
8th Grand Prix de Denain
9th Grand Prix Impanis-Van Petegem
