= Omloop van Midden-België =

Race details
- Date: May, June
- Region: Antwerp, Belgium
- English name: Circuit of Central Belgium
- Local name(s): Omloop van Midden-België (in Dutch), Circuit de la Belgique Centrale (in French)
- Discipline: Road
- Type: One-day race

History
- First edition: 1948
- Editions: 29
- Final edition: 1979
- First winner: Ernest Sterckx (BEL)
- Most wins: Ernest Sterckx (BEL); Herman Van Springel (BEL); Jos Hoevenaers (BEL); Rik Luyten (BEL) (2 wins)
- Final winner: Gery Verlinden (BEL)

The Omloop van Midden-België was a men's cycling race organized for the last time in 1979. The start and finish place was Lier, Belgium.

The competition's roll of honor includes the successes of Fred De Bruyne, Herman Van Springel and Willy Planckaert.

== Winners ==
Year	Winner	Second	Third
1948	(Belgium) Ernest Sterckx	(Belgium) Maurice Mollin	(Belgium) Jos Mertens
1949	(Belgium) Stan Verschueren	(Belgium) Victor Jacobs	(Belgium) Julien Janssens
1950	No race		
1951	(Belgium) Marcel Hendrickx	(Belgium) Jos De Feyter	(Belgium) Frans Loyaerts
1952	(Belgium) Ernest Sterckx	(Belgium) Gérard Buyl	(Belgium) Maurice Neyt
1953	(Belgium) Alfons Van Den Brande	(Belgium) Edward Peeters	(Belgium) Joseph Marien
1954	(Belgium) Jos De Feyter	(Belgium) Alfons Van Den Brande	(Belgium) Jan Adriaensens
1955	(Belgium) Alfred De Bruyne	(Belgium) Jos De Feyter	(Belgium) Rik Van Looy
1956	(Belgium) Willy Schroeders	(Belgium) Willy Vannitsen	(Belgium) Lode Anthonis
1957	(Belgium) Jos Hoevenaers	(Belgium) Rik Van Looy	(Belgium) Jean Van Gompel
1958	(Belgium) Martin Van Geneugden	(Belgium) Joseph Theuns	(Belgium) Roger Molenaers
1959	(Belgium) Jos Hoevenaers	(Belgium) Frans Aerenhouts	(Belgium) Marcel Janssens
1960	(Belgium) Rik Luyten	(Belgium) Raymond Vrancken	(Belgium) René Van Meenen
1961	(Belgium) Gustaaf Desmet	(Belgium) Jean Meuris	(Belgium) Etienne Vercauteren
1962	(Belgium) Joseph Hoevenaers	(Belgium) Constant De Keyser	(Netherlands) Piet Damen
1963	(Belgium) Rik Luyten	(Belgium) Jan Lauwers	(Belgium) Joseph Bosmans
1964	(Belgium) Victor Van Schil	(Belgium) Théo Mertens	(Belgium) Joseph Bosmans
1965	(Belgium) Auguste Verhaegen	(Belgium) Louis Proost	(Belgium) Victor Van Schil
1966	(Belgium) René Van Meenen	(Belgium) Rik Van Looy	(Belgium) Paul Somers
1967	(Belgium) Willy In 't Ven	(Belgium) Alfons Cools	(Belgium) Noël De Pauw
1968	(Belgium) Herman Van Springel	(Netherlands) Wim Schepers	(Belgium) Pieter Nassen
1969	(Belgium) Herman Van Springel	(Netherlands) Winfried Boelke	(Belgium) Joseph Huysmans
1970	(Belgium) Roger Rosiers	(Belgium) Gilbert Wuytack	(Belgium) Flory Ongenae
1971	(Belgium) Joseph Abelshausen	(Belgium) Julien Knockaert	(Germany) Dieter Puschel
1972	(Belgium) Eddy Verstraeten	(Belgium) Roger Kindt	(Belgium) Georges Barras
1973	(Belgium) Willy Planckaert	(Belgium) Joseph Abelshausen	(Netherlands) Johan Van Katwijk
1974	(Belgium) Frans Verhaegen	(Belgium) Roger Rosiers	(Belgium) Gustaaf Van Roosbroeck
1975	(Belgium) Marc Renier	(Belgium) Serge Vandaele	(Belgium) Willem Peeters
1976	No race		
1977	(Belgium) Emil Gijsemans	(Belgium) Willem Peeters	(Belgium) André Delcroix
1978	(Belgium) Gustaaf Van Roosbroeck	(Belgium) Frans Verhaegen	(Belgium) André Delcroix
1979	(Belgium) Gery Verlinden	(Belgium) Alfons De Bal	(Belgium) Guido Van Sweevelt
