= Claude Tollet =

French cyclist

Personal information
- Full name: Claude Tollet
- Born: April 24, 1949 (age 77) Roisel, France

Cycling career
- Sport: Cycling
- Discipline: Road
- Role: Rider

Major wins
- 1 stage 1973 Tour de France

Claude Tollet (Roisel, 24 April 1949) was a French professional road bicycle racer, who won stage 17 in the 1973 Tour de France.

== Major results ==
1972
GP de Lillers
1973
Hénin-Beaumont
Tour de France:

Winner stage 17

== See also ==
- List of doping cases in cycling
