= Gérard Besnard =

French cyclist (1945–2026)

Personal information
- Born: 9 May 1945 Saint-Symphorien, Eure, France
- Died: 10 March 2026 (aged 80) Saint-Cyr-sur-Loire, France

Cycling career
- Sport: Cycling
- Role: Rider

Gérard Bernard Eugene Besnard (9 May 1945 – 10 March 2026) was a French racing cyclist. He rode in the 1973 Tour de France.

Besnard died in Saint-Cyr-sur-Loire on 10 March 2026, at the age of 80.
