= Jean-Claude Largeau =

French cyclist

Personal information
- Born: 6 April 1949 (age 77)

Cycling career
- Sport: Cycling
- Role: Rider

Jean-Claude Largeau (born 6 April 1949) is a French racing cyclist. He rode in the 1972 Tour de France.
