= Gustaaf Van Cauter =

Belgian cyclist

Personal information
- Born: 31 March 1948 (age 78) Mechelen, Belgium

Cycling career
- Sport: Cycling

Gustaaf (Staf) Van Cauter, (born 31 March 1948) is a former racing cyclist. He was born in Mechelen, Belgium. He competed in the team time trial at the 1972 Summer Olympics. As of 2010, Van Cauter is President of molecular imaging company Bioscan.

== Major sport achievements ==
- 1970
  - winner 1st étape at the Tour de Namur
- 1971
  - world champion, 100 km team road race
- 1972
  - 3rd place, 1972 Summer Olympics, 100 km team road race
