= Michel Roques =

French cyclist

Personal information
- Born: 20 July 1946
- Died: 8 October 2006 (aged 60)

Cycling career
- Sport: Cycling
- Role: Rider

Michel Roques (20 July 1946 – 8 October 2006) was a French racing cyclist. He rode in the 1973 Tour de France.
