= Christian Blain =

French cyclist

Personal information
- Born: 31 July 1948 (age 78)

Cycling career
- Sport: Cycling
- Role: Rider

Christian Blain (born 31 July 1948) is a French racing cyclist. He rode in the 1973 Tour de France.
