= Willy De Geest =

Belgian cyclist

Personal information
- Born: 8 January 1947 (age 79) Ghent, Belgium

Cycling career
- Sport: Cycling
- Role: Rider

Willy De Geest (born 8 January 1947) is a Belgian former professional racing cyclist. He rode in the 1973 Tour de France and the 1976 Tour de France.

His grandson Fabio Van den Bossche won a bronze medal at the 2024 Summer Olympics in Paris, France.
