= Eddy Verstraeten =

Belgian cyclist

- Verstraeten in 1981

Personal information
- Full name: Eddy Verstraeten
- Born: 15 September 1948 Leuven, Belgium
- Died: 7 December 2005 (aged 57) Booischot, Belgium

Cycling career
- Sport: Cycling
- Discipline: Road
- Role: Rider

Professional teams
- 1970: Geens-Watneys
- 1971-1972: Watneys-Avia
- 1973-1974: Watney-Maes
- 1975: Maes Pils-Watney
- 1976-1977: IJsboerke-Colnago
- 1978: Zoppas-Zeus-Ruch'or
- 1978: Mini-Flat-V.D.B.-Pirelli
- 1980: Vermeer-Thijs-Mini-Flat
- 1981: Vermeer-Thijs-Mimo Salons

Major wins
- Grand Tours Tour de France 1 individual stages (1973)

Eddy Verstraeten (15 September 1948, in Leuven – 7 December 2005, in Booischot) was a Belgian professional road bicycle racer. Verstraeten won stage 2B of the 1973 Tour de France.

== Major results ==
1970
1st Stage 1 Peace Race
1st Trofee Het Volk
1st Puurs
2nd Heistse Pijl
2nd Flèche Ardennaise amateurs
1971
1st Grote Prijs Raymond Impanis
1st Omloop van Midden-Brabant
2nd Elfstedenronde
3rd Grote Prijs Beeckman-De Caluwé
4th Ronde van Brabant
5th Omloop van Midden-België
1972
1st Booischot
1st Omloop van Midden-België
1st Harelbeke–Poperinge–Harelbeke (fr)
2nd Brussel–Ingooigem
2nd Heistse Pijl
2nd Grand Prix de Hannut (fr)
3rd Dwars door België
5th Grand Prix de Wallonie
1973
1st Booischot
1st Circuit du Port de Dunkerque (fr)
1st Drogenbos
1st Harelbeke–Poperinge–Harelbeke (fr)
Tour de France:

1st stage 2a (TTT) and 2b

1st Trèfle à Quatre Feuilles
3rd Circuit du Tournaisis
4th Grote 1-MeiPrijs
1974
1st Beveren-Leie
1st Grand Prix de Hannut (fr)
1st Hyon–Mons
2nd Kuurne–Brussels–Kuurne
2nd Maaslandse Pijl (fr)
2nd Omloop van het Zuidwesten
3rd GP Stad Zottegem
3rd Grand Prix de Denain
1975
1st Grand Prix Pino Cerami
1st Stage 1 Tour of the Netherlands (TTT)
1st Stage 1 Tour de Luxembourg (TTT)
2nd Omloop van het Waasland
2nd Omloop der Zennevallei
4th Schaal Sels
1976
1st Booischot
1st Omloop van het Waasland
1st Teralfene
3rd Maaslandse Pijl (fr)
3rd Milano–Torino
3rd Mémorial Thijssen
3rd GP Dr. Eugeen Roggeman (nl)
1977
1st Nieuwkerken-Waas
1st Sint-Katelijne-Waver
2nd Circuit de Neeroeteren
2nd Nationale Sluitingsprijs
7th Tour du Condroz
1978
1st Berner Rundfahrt
1st Grote 1-Mei Prijs
1st Booischot
1st Putte-Mechelen
2nd GP Stad Vilvoorde
2nd Harelbeke–Poperinge–Harelbeke (fr)
2nd Omloop van de Vlaamse Scheldeboorden
3rd Omloop van Oost-Vlaanderen
3rd Puivelde Koerse (nl)
1979
1st Duffel
1st Heistse Pijl
1st Stage 5 Tour of Belgium
1st Oostrozebeke
2nd GP E5 Heverlee
1980
1st Booischot
1st Mortsel
1st Bonheiden
3rd GP Stad Vilvoorde
4th Flèche Halloise
5th Grote Prijs Jef Scherens
5th Grote Prijs Raymond Impanis
8th Bordeaux–Paris
1981
1st Omloop Hageland-Zuiderkempen
2nd Brussel–Ingooigem
2nd Heistse Pijl
