= Jesús Esperanza (cyclist) =

Spanish cyclist (born 1948)

Personal information
- Born: 16 March 1948 (age 78)

Cycling career
- Sport: Cycling
- Role: Rider

Jesús Esperanza (born 13 March 1948) is a Spanish racing cyclist. He rode in the 1973 Tour de France.
