= Daniel Ducreux =

French cyclist (born 1947)

Personal information
- Born: 11 February 1947 (age 79) Saint-Philbert-sur-Risle, France

Cycling career
- Sport: Cycling

Daniel Ducreux (born 11 February 1947) is a French former cyclist. He competed in the individual road race at the 1968 Summer Olympics. His sporting career began with VC Pont-Audemer.
