= Alfred Gaida =

German cyclist

Personal information
- Born: 27 July 1951 (age 75) Prószków, Poland

Cycling career
- Sport: Cycling

Alfred Gaida (born 27 July 1951) is a German former cyclist. He competed in the individual road race for West Germany at the 1972 Summer Olympics.
