= René Grelin =

French cyclist

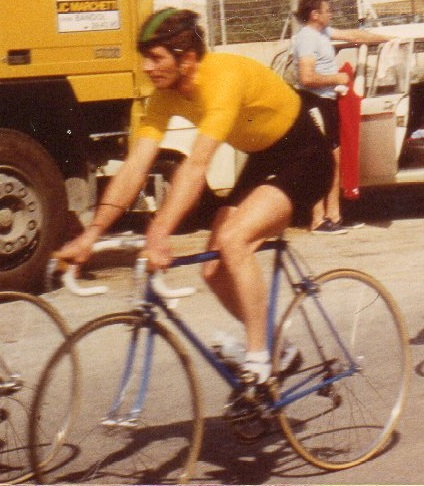

Personal information
- Born: 21 September 1942 (age 84)

Cycling career
- Sport: Cycling
- Role: Rider

René Grelin (born 21 September 1942) is a French racing cyclist. His sporting career began with V.C. Dole. He rode in the 1970 Tour de France.
