= José Catieau =

French cyclist (1946–2023)

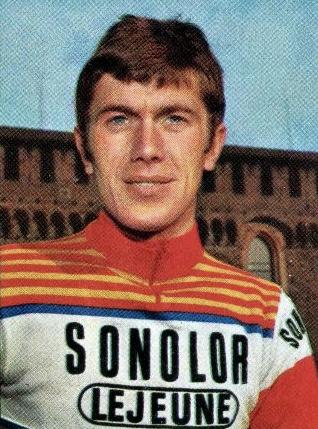
- Catieau in 1971

Personal information
- Full name: José Catieau
- Born: 17 July 1946 Coutiches, France
- Died: 30 November 2023 (aged 77) Saint-Quentin, Aisne, France

Cycling career
- Sport: Cycling
- Discipline: Road
- Role: Rider

Major wins
- Paris–Camembert (1972); One stage Tour de France (1973)

José Catieau (17 July 1946 – 30 November 2023) was a French professional road bicycle racer. He was a professional from 1969 to 1976. For the 1973 season, Catieau was a teammate of the great Spanish cyclist Luis Ocaña on the Bic team. At the start of the 1973 Tour de France, Catieau won stage 1b into St.Niklaas in Belgium. The third stage of the 1973 Tour de France began in Roubaix and part of the day's stage went over some cobblestones which are traditionally used in the Spring Classic, Paris–Roubaix. When the peloton went over a section of cobblestones at Querenaing, Catieau, Ocaña and three teammates together with a group of 5 riders attacked and got an advantage. This advantage was over five minutes at one point but the chasing group reduced this to two and a half minutes at the finish. At the vélodrome in Reims, Cyrille Guimard won the sprint but Catieau took the yellow jersey as leader of the general classification and Ocaña had distanced many of the favourites for the general classification. Catieau kept the yellow jersey for four days until the first mountain stage when Ocaña took the jersey. Catieau also won the Paris–Camembert in 1972. Catieau died on 30 November 2023, at the age of 77.

== Major results ==
1969
Henon
1972
Paris–Camembert
1973
Saint-Quentin
Le Quillo
Tour de France:

Winner stage 1B
Wearing yellow jersey for four days

1975
GP de Soissons
