= Gitane–Frigécrème =

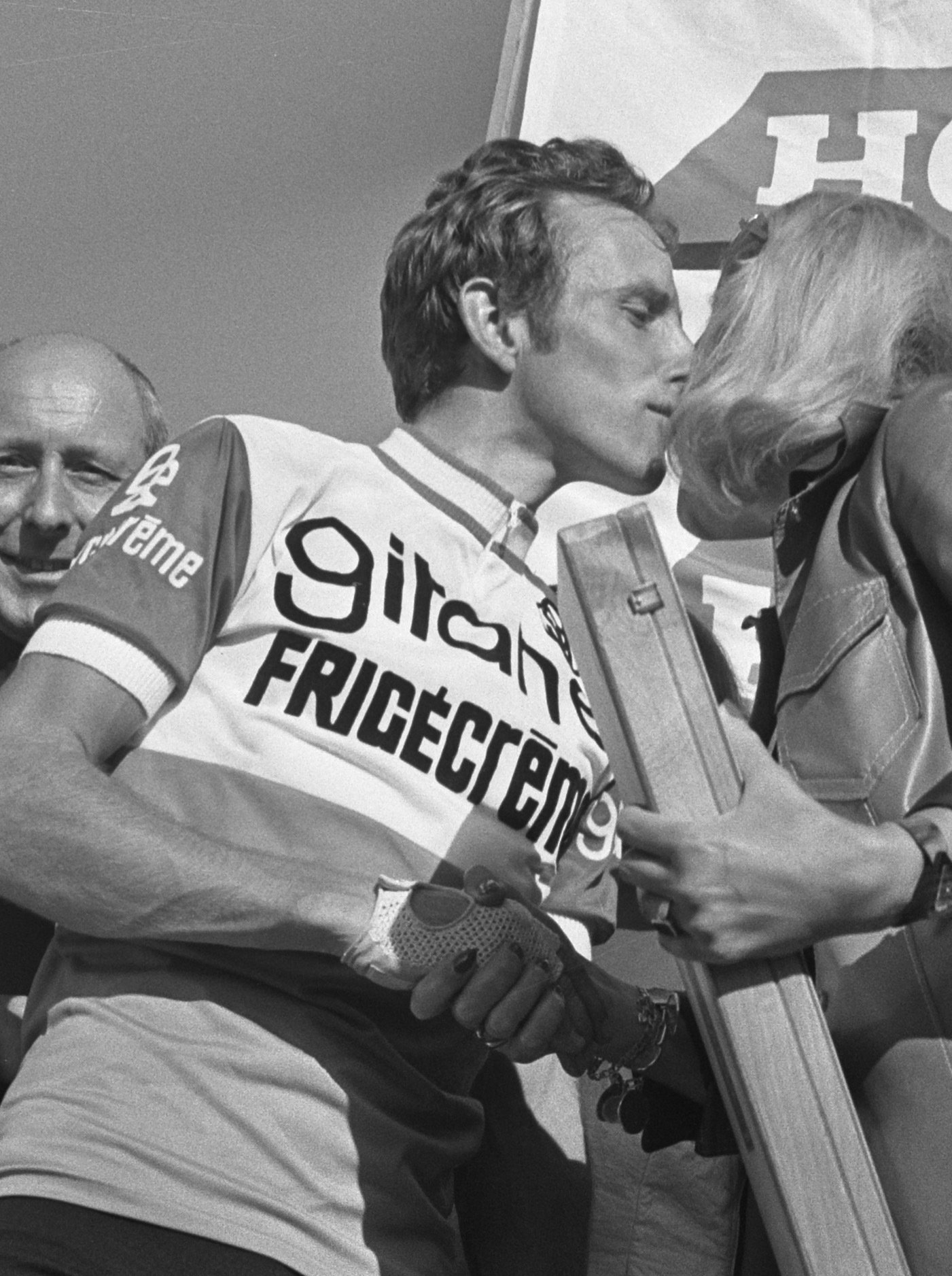
- Joop Zoetemelk at the 1973 Tour de France

Team information
- Registered: France
- Founded: 1972
- Disbanded: 1973
- Discipline: Road

Key personnel
- General manager: Andre Desvrages

Team name history
- 1972 1973: Gitane; Gitane–Frigécrème

Gitane–Frigécrème was a French professional cycling team that existed from 1972 to 1973. At the end of the 1973 season, the team was merged into the Sonolor team, which was renamed Sonolor–Gitane for 1974. Its main sponsor was French bicycle manufacturer Gitane.
