= Jack Mourioux =

French cyclist

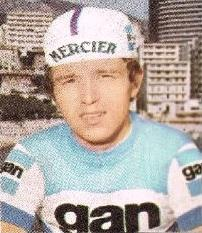

Personal information
- Born: 6 March 1948 (age 78) Saint-Michel-sur-Orge, France

Cycling career
- Sport: Cycling

Jack Mourioux (born 6 March 1948) is a former French cyclist. He competed in the team pursuit at the 1968 Summer Olympics.
