= Michel Périn (cyclist) =

French cyclist

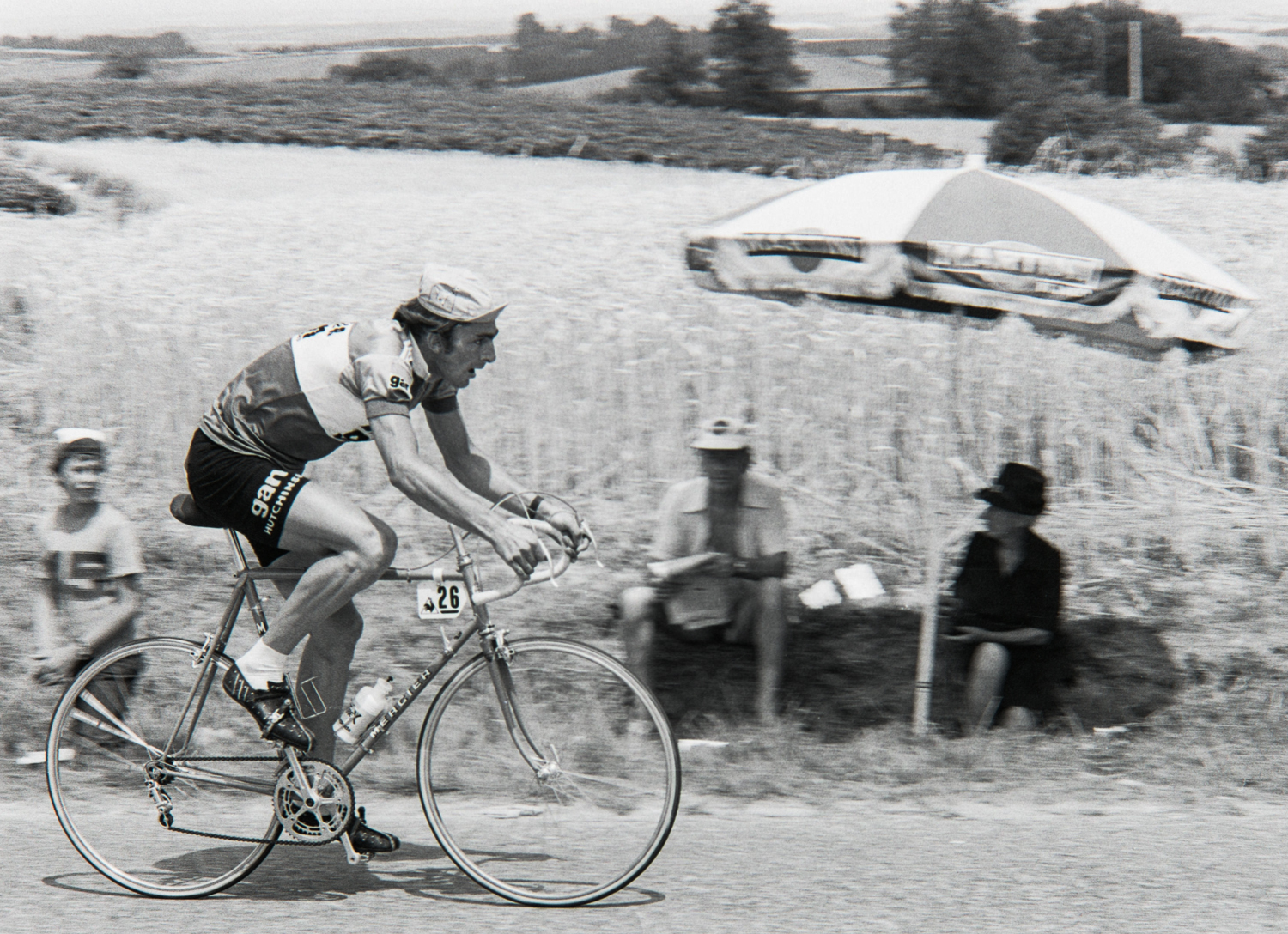
- Périn in the 1976 Tour de France

Personal information
- Born: 20 May 1947 (age 79) Nérac, France

Cycling career
- Sport: Cycling
- Role: Rider

Michel Périn (born 20 May 1947) is a French former professional racing cyclist. He rode in seven editions of the Tour de France.
