= Canada Dry–Gazelle =

Former Dutch professional cycling team

Team information
- Registered: Netherlands (1973–1974); Belgium (1974)
- Founded: 1973
- Disbanded: 1974
- Discipline: Road
- Bicycles: Gazelle

Key personnel
- General manager: Ton Vissers

Team name history
- 1973 January 1974 – April 1974 April 1974 – December 1974: Canada Dry–Gazelle; Robot–Gazelle; Robot–Office du Meuble Hannut
Canada Dry–Gazelle jersey
Jersey

Canada Dry–Gazelle was a Dutch professional cycling team that existed in 1973 and 1974.
