= Jan Krekels =

Dutch cyclist (born 1947)

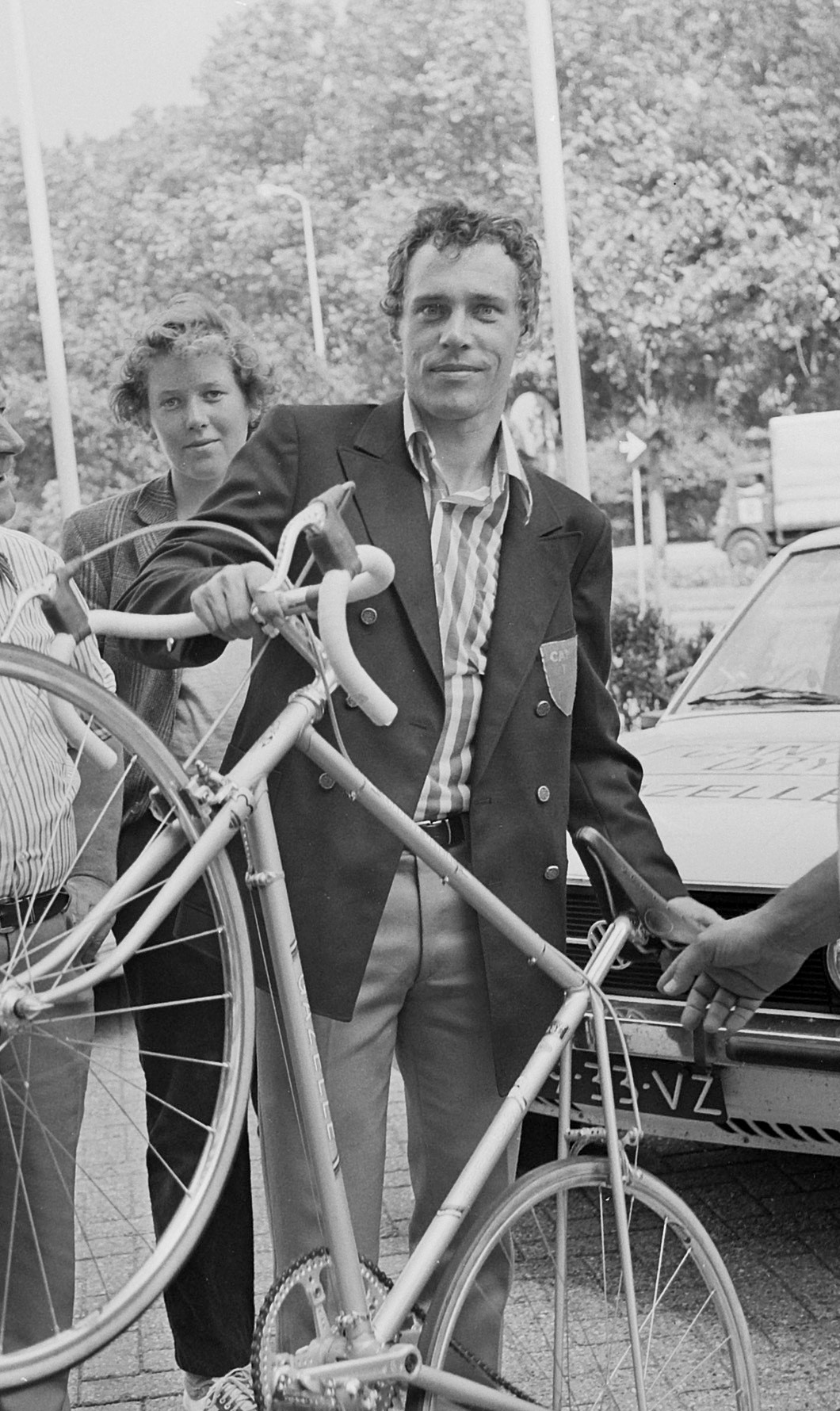
- Jan Krekels with his Tour de France bike in 1973

Personal information
- Full name: Jan Krekels
- Born: 26 August 1947 (age 79) Sittard, Netherlands
- Height: 1.79 m (5 ft 10 in)
- Weight: 73 kg (161 lb)

Cycling career
- Sport: Cycling
- Current team: Retired
- Discipline: Road
- Role: Rider
Medal record
Representing the Netherlands
Men's road bicycle racing
Olympic Games
Gold medal – first place	1968 Mexico City	Team time trial

Jan Jozef Alfons Franciscus Krekels (born 26 August 1947) is a retired cyclist from the Netherlands. He became Olympic champion in the 100 km team time trial in 1968 with Joop Zoetemelk, René Pijnen and Fedor den Hertog; at the same Games he came in 11th in the road race. He also won the 19th stage of the Tour de France in 1971 and the prologue of Paris–Nice in 1970. He retired from professional cycling in 1978.

Krekels won three four major races of 1968, including the Tour of Austria, to be selected to the 1968 Olympic team. In 1969 he turned professional. He turned down a contract with the French team, Bic because he did not speak French. He rode instead for a small Dutch team and his career fizzled out.

== Major results ==
1968
Archer International Grand Prix
Omloop der Kempen
Ronde van Overijssel
Tour of Austria
Ronde van Limburg
(gold) Olympic Games team time trial
1969
Orchies
1970
Acht van Chaam
1971
Ulestraten
Strombeek-Bever
Tour de France:

Winner stage 19

1972
Simpelveld
Vuelta a Andalucía
1972
Born
1973
Valkenswaard
Born
1974
Beringen
Geetbets
1976
Arendonk
Kloosterzande
Kruiningen
1978
Obbicht
Boxmeer
