= Régis Ovion =

French cyclist (born 1949)

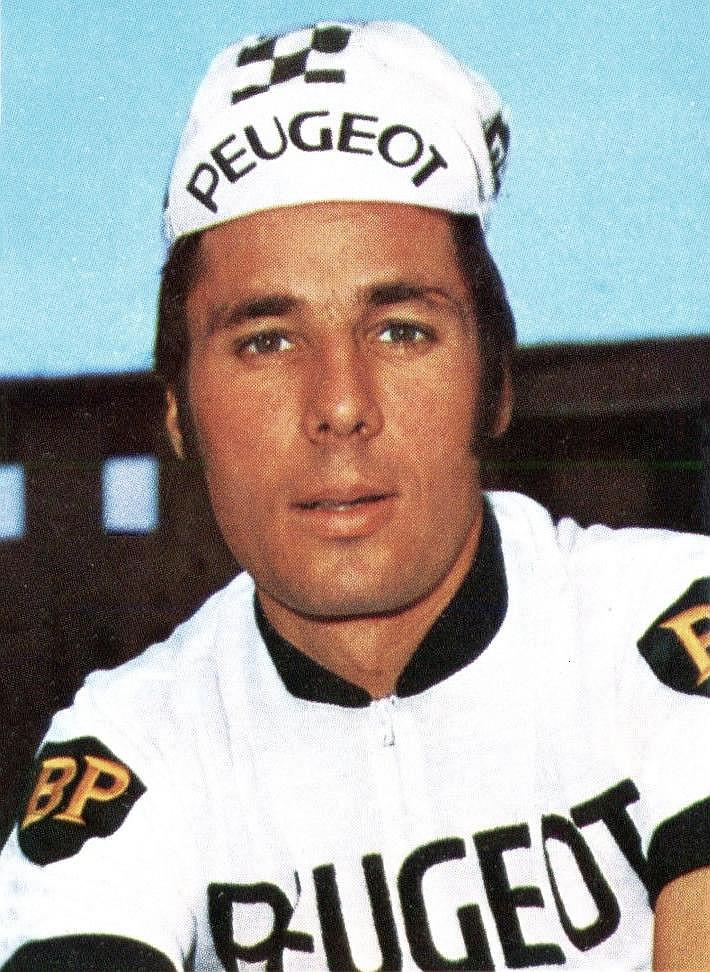

Personal information
- Full name: Régis Ovion
- Born: 3 March 1949 (age 77) Vigneux-sur-Seine, France
- Height: 177 cm (5 ft 10 in)
- Weight: 64 kg (141 lb)

Cycling career
- Sport: Cycling
- Discipline: Road
- Role: Rider

Amateur team
- 1969–1971: AC Boulogne-Billancourt

Professional teams
- 1972–1979: Peugeot–BP–Michelin
- 1980: Puch–Sem–Campagnolo
- 1981–1982: Puch–Wolber–Campagnolo
Medal record
Representing France
World Championships
| Gold medal – first place | 1971 Mendrisio | Road race |

Régis Ovion (born 3 March 1949) is a French former road racing cyclist. As an amateur he won the individual world title and the Tour de l'Avenir in 1971 and placed 15th in the road race at the 1972 Summer Olympics. After the Olympics he turned professional and rode the Tour de France in 1973–78 and 1980–81 with the best result of tenth place in 1973. He also won the French National Road Race Championships in 1975.
