= 1976 Tour de France, Stage 13 to Stage 22b =

Cycling race stages

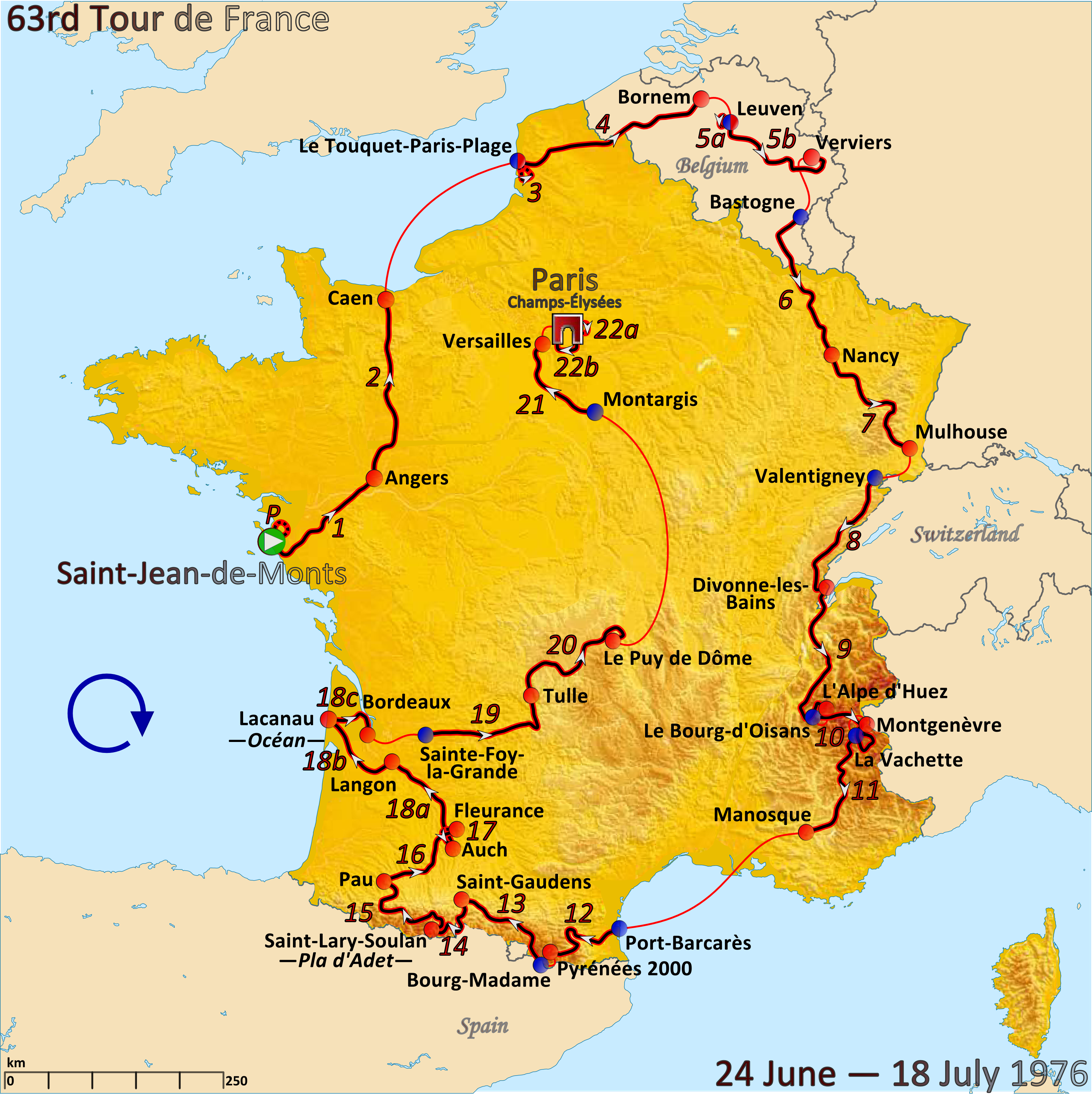
Route of the 1976 Tour de France

The 1976 Tour de France was the 63rd edition of the Tour de France, one of cycling's Grand Tours. The Tour began in Saint-Jean-de-Monts with a prologue individual time trial on 24 June, and Stage 13 occurred on 9 July with a mountainous stage from Font-Romeu-Odeillo-Via. The race finished in Paris on 18 July.

== Stage 13 ==
9 July 1976 – Font-Romeu-Odeillo-Via to Saint-Gaudens, 188 km (117 mi)

Stage 13 result

Rank	Rider	Team	Time
~~1~~	~~Régis Ovion (FRA)~~	~~Peugeot–Esso~~	~~s.t.~~ (Note: Ovion was declassified from first place, after the thirteenth stage, for a positive doping test.)
1	Willy Teirlinck (BEL)	Gitane–Campagnolo	4h 57' 23"
2	Wladimiro Panizza (ITA)	Scic–Fiat	s.t.
4	Mariano Martínez (FRA)	Lejeune–BP	s.t.
5	André Chalmel (FRA)	Gitane–Campagnolo	s.t.
6	Raymond Poulidor (FRA)	Gan–Mercier	s.t.
7	Hennie Kuiper (NED)	TI–Raleigh	s.t.
8	Freddy Maertens (BEL)	Velda–Flandria	+ 7"
9	Gerben Karstens (NED)	TI–Raleigh	s.t.
10	José Viejo (ESP)	Super Ser	s.t.

General classification after stage 13

Rank	Rider	Team	Time
1	Raymond Delisle (FRA)	Peugeot–Esso	72h 24' 53"
2	Lucien Van Impe (BEL)	Gitane–Campagnolo	+ 2' 41"
3	Joop Zoetemelk (NED)	Gan–Mercier	+ 2' 47"
4	Raymond Poulidor (FRA)	Gan–Mercier	+ 4' 10"
5	Francisco Galdós (ESP)	Kas–Campagnolo	+ 4' 45"
6	Bernard Thévenet (FRA)	Peugeot–Esso	+ 4' 53"
7	Fausto Bertoglio (ITA)	Jolly Ceramica	+ 5' 58"
8	Michel Pollentier (BEL)	Velda–Flandria	+ 6' 11"
9	Hennie Kuiper (NED)	TI–Raleigh	+ 7' 10"
10	José Martins (POR)	Kas–Campagnolo	+ 7' 45"

== Stage 14 ==
10 July 1976 – Saint-Gaudens to Saint-Lary-Soulan, 139 km (86 mi)

Stage 14 result

Rank	Rider	Team	Time
1	Lucien Van Impe (BEL)	Gitane–Campagnolo	4h 20' 50"
2	Joop Zoetemelk (NED)	Gan–Mercier	+ 3' 12"
3	Walter Riccomi (ITA)	Scic–Fiat	+ 3' 45"
4	Luis Ocaña (ESP)	Super Ser	+ 3' 50"
5	Pedro Torres (ESP)	Super Ser	+ 7' 01"
6	José Pesarrodona (ESP)	Kas–Campagnolo	+ 7' 40"
7	Freddy Maertens (BEL)	Velda–Flandria	+ 7' 48"
8	Régis Ovion (FRA)	Peugeot–Esso	+ 9' 09"
9	André Romero (FRA)	Jobo–Wolber–La France	+ 9' 58"
10	Ronald De Witte (BEL)	Brooklyn	+ 10' 07"

General classification after stage 14

Rank	Rider	Team	Time
1	Lucien Van Impe (BEL)	Gitane–Campagnolo	76h 48' 24"
2	Joop Zoetemelk (NED)	Gan–Mercier	+ 3' 18"
3	Raymond Delisle (FRA)	Peugeot–Esso	+ 9' 27"
4	Walter Riccomi (ITA)	Scic–Fiat	+ 10' 22"
5	Raymond Poulidor (FRA)	Gan–Mercier	+ 11' 42"
6	Francisco Galdós (ESP)	Kas–Campagnolo	+ 12' 13"
7	Fausto Bertoglio (ITA)	Jolly Ceramica	+ 13' 26"
8	Freddy Maertens (BEL)	Velda–Flandria	+ 14' 08"
9	José Pesarrodona (ESP)	Kas–Campagnolo	+ 14' 45"
10	Luis Ocaña (ESP)	Super Ser	+ 14' 48"

== Stage 15 ==
11 July 1976 – Saint-Lary-Soulan to Pau, 195 km (121 mi)

Stage 15 result

Rank	Rider	Team	Time
1	Wladimiro Panizza (ITA)	Scic–Fiat	6h 01' 37"
2	Enrico Paolini (ITA)	Scic–Fiat	+ 2' 16"
3	Michel Pollentier (BEL)	Velda–Flandria	s.t.
4	Arnaldo Caverzasi (ITA)	Scic–Fiat	s.t.
5	Donato Giuliani (ITA)	Jolly Ceramica	s.t.
6	Antonio Menéndez (ESP)	Kas–Campagnolo	s.t.
7	Georges Talbourdet (FRA)	Gan–Mercier	s.t.
8	Carlos Melero (ESP)	Kas–Campagnolo	s.t.
9	José Martins (POR)	Kas–Campagnolo	s.t.
10	Freddy Maertens (BEL)	Velda–Flandria	+ 5' 44"

General classification after stage 15

Rank	Rider	Team	Time
1	Lucien Van Impe (BEL)	Gitane–Campagnolo	82h 55' 45"
2	Joop Zoetemelk (NED)	Gan–Mercier	+ 3' 18"
3	Raymond Delisle (FRA)	Peugeot–Esso	+ 9' 27"
4	Walter Riccomi (ITA)	Scic–Fiat	+ 10' 22"
5	Raymond Poulidor (FRA)	Gan–Mercier	+ 11' 42"
6	Francisco Galdós (ESP)	Kas–Campagnolo	+ 12' 13"
7	Michel Pollentier (BEL)	Velda–Flandria	+ 13' 09"
8	Fausto Bertoglio (ITA)	Jolly Ceramica	+ 13' 26"
9	Freddy Maertens (BEL)	Velda–Flandria	+ 14' 08"
10	José Pesarrodona (ESP)	Kas–Campagnolo	+ 14' 45"

== Stage 16 ==
12 July 1976 – Pau to Fleurance, 152 km (94 mi)

Stage 16 result

Rank	Rider	Team	Time
1	Michel Pollentier (BEL)	Velda–Flandria	4h 38' 33"
2	Freddy Maertens (BEL)	Velda–Flandria	+ 16"
3	Gerben Karstens (NED)	TI–Raleigh	s.t.
4	Piero Gavazzi (ITA)	Jolly Ceramica	s.t.
5	Jacques Esclassan (FRA)	Peugeot–Esso	s.t.
6	Enrico Paolini (ITA)	Scic–Fiat	s.t.
7	Marcello Osler (ITA)	Brooklyn	s.t.
8	Alessio Antonini (ITA)	Jolly Ceramica	s.t.
9	Willy Teirlinck (BEL)	Gitane–Campagnolo	s.t.
10	Robert Mintkiewicz (FRA)	Gitane–Campagnolo	s.t.

General classification after stage 16

Rank	Rider	Team	Time
1	Lucien Van Impe (BEL)	Gitane–Campagnolo	87h 34' 34"
2	Joop Zoetemelk (NED)	Gan–Mercier	+ 3' 18"
3	Raymond Delisle (FRA)	Peugeot–Esso	+ 9' 27"
4	Walter Riccomi (ITA)	Scic–Fiat	+ 10' 22"
5	Raymond Poulidor (FRA)	Gan–Mercier	+ 11' 42"
6	Francisco Galdós (ESP)	Kas–Campagnolo	+ 12' 13"
7	Michel Pollentier (BEL)	Velda–Flandria	+ 12' 53"
8	Fausto Bertoglio (ITA)	Jolly Ceramica	+ 13' 26"
9	Freddy Maertens (BEL)	Velda–Flandria	+ 14' 08"
10	José Pesarrodona (ESP)	Kas–Campagnolo	+ 14' 45"

== Stage 17 ==
13 July 1976 – Fleurance to Auch, 39 km (24 mi) (ITT)

Stage 17 result

Rank	Rider	Team	Time
1	Ferdinand Bracke (BEL)	Lejeune–BP	52' 41"
2	Knut Knudsen (NOR)	Jolly Ceramica	+ 8"
3	Freddy Maertens (BEL)	Velda–Flandria	+ 11"
4	Lucien Van Impe (BEL)	Gitane–Campagnolo	+ 51"
5	Michel Pollentier (BEL)	Velda–Flandria	+ 1' 01"
6	Raymond Poulidor (FRA)	Gan–Mercier	+ 1' 04"
7	Bert Pronk (NED)	TI–Raleigh	+ 1' 25"
8	Fausto Bertoglio (ITA)	Jolly Ceramica	+ 1' 49"
9	José Pesarrodona (ESP)	Kas–Campagnolo	+ 1' 52"
10	Joop Zoetemelk (NED)	Gan–Mercier	+ 2' 08"

General classification after stage 17

Rank	Rider	Team	Time
1	Lucien Van Impe (BEL)	Gitane–Campagnolo	88h 28' 06"
2	Joop Zoetemelk (NED)	Gan–Mercier	+ 4' 33"
3	Raymond Delisle (FRA)	Peugeot–Esso	+ 11' 25"
4	Raymond Poulidor (FRA)	Gan–Mercier	+ 11' 55"
5	Walter Riccomi (ITA)	Scic–Fiat	+ 11' 57"
6	Michel Pollentier (BEL)	Velda–Flandria	+ 13' 03"
7	Freddy Maertens (BEL)	Velda–Flandria	+ 13' 28"
8	Francisco Galdós (ESP)	Kas–Campagnolo	+ 14' 20"
9	Fausto Bertoglio (ITA)	Jolly Ceramica	+ 14' 24"
10	José Pesarrodona (ESP)	Kas–Campagnolo	+ 15' 46"

== Stage 18a ==
14 July 1976 – Auch to Langon, 86 km (53 mi)

Stage 18a result

Rank	Rider	Team	Time
1	Freddy Maertens (BEL)	Velda–Flandria	2h 34' 37"
2	Gerben Karstens (NED)	TI–Raleigh	s.t.
3	Piero Gavazzi (ITA)	Jolly Ceramica	s.t.
4	Gerard Vianen (NED)	Gan–Mercier	s.t.
5	Régis Delépine (FRA)	Gan–Mercier	s.t.
6	Alessio Antonini (ITA)	Jolly Ceramica	s.t.
7	Ronald De Witte (BEL)	Brooklyn	s.t.
8	Miguel María Lasa (ESP)	Scic–Fiat	s.t.
9	Herman Van der Slagmolen (BEL)	Brooklyn	s.t.
10	Patrick Béon (FRA)	Peugeot–Esso	s.t.

General classification after stage 18a

Rank	Rider	Team	Time
1	Lucien Van Impe (BEL)	Gitane–Campagnolo	91h 02' 43"
2	Joop Zoetemelk (NED)	Gan–Mercier	+ 4' 33"
3	Raymond Delisle (FRA)	Peugeot–Esso	+ 11' 25"
4	Raymond Poulidor (FRA)	Gan–Mercier	+ 11' 55"
5	Walter Riccomi (ITA)	Scic–Fiat	+ 11' 57"
6	Michel Pollentier (BEL)	Velda–Flandria	+ 13' 03"
7	Freddy Maertens (BEL)	Velda–Flandria	+ 13' 28"
8	Francisco Galdós (ESP)	Kas–Campagnolo	+ 14' 20"
9	Fausto Bertoglio (ITA)	Jolly Ceramica	+ 14' 24"
10	José Pesarrodona (ESP)	Kas–Campagnolo	+ 15' 46"

== Stage 18b ==
14 July 1976 – Langon to Lacanau, 123 km (76 mi)

Stage 18b result

Rank	Rider	Team	Time
1	Freddy Maertens (BEL)	Velda–Flandria	3h 27' 00"
2	Jacques Esclassan (FRA)	Peugeot–Esso	s.t.
3	Enrico Paolini (ITA)	Scic–Fiat	s.t.
4	José De Cauwer (BEL)	TI–Raleigh	s.t.
5	Jan Raas (NED)	TI–Raleigh	s.t.
6	Herman Van der Slagmolen (BEL)	Brooklyn	s.t.
7	Roger Legeay (FRA)	Lejeune–BP	s.t.
8	Willy Teirlinck (BEL)	Gitane–Campagnolo	s.t.
9	Régis Ovion (FRA)	Peugeot–Esso	s.t.
10	Mariano Martínez (FRA)	Lejeune–BP	s.t.

General classification after stage 18b

Rank	Rider	Team	Time
1	Lucien Van Impe (BEL)	Gitane–Campagnolo	94h 29' 43"
2	Joop Zoetemelk (NED)	Gan–Mercier	+ 4' 33"
3	Raymond Delisle (FRA)	Peugeot–Esso	+ 11' 25"
4	Raymond Poulidor (FRA)	Gan–Mercier	+ 11' 55"
5	Walter Riccomi (ITA)	Scic–Fiat	+ 11' 57"
6	Michel Pollentier (BEL)	Velda–Flandria	+ 13' 03"
7	Freddy Maertens (BEL)	Velda–Flandria	+ 13' 28"
8	Francisco Galdós (ESP)	Kas–Campagnolo	+ 14' 20"
9	Fausto Bertoglio (ITA)	Jolly Ceramica	+ 14' 24"
10	José Pesarrodona (ESP)	Kas–Campagnolo	+ 15' 46"

== Stage 18c ==
14 July 1976 – Lacanau to Bordeaux, 70 km (43 mi)

Stage 18c result

Rank	Rider	Team	Time
1	Gerben Karstens (NED)	TI–Raleigh	1h 42' 13"
2	Freddy Maertens (BEL)	Velda–Flandria	s.t.
3	Enrico Paolini (ITA)	Scic–Fiat	s.t.
4	Jacques Esclassan (FRA)	Peugeot–Esso	s.t.
5	Gerard Vianen (NED)	Gan–Mercier	s.t.
6	Guy Sibille (FRA)	Peugeot–Esso	s.t.
7	Régis Delépine (FRA)	Gan–Mercier	s.t.
8	Herman Van der Slagmolen (BEL)	Brooklyn	s.t.
9	Ronald De Witte (BEL)	Brooklyn	s.t.
10	Robert Mintkiewicz (FRA)	Gitane–Campagnolo	s.t.

General classification after stage 18c

Rank	Rider	Team	Time
1	Lucien Van Impe (BEL)	Gitane–Campagnolo	96h 11' 56"
2	Joop Zoetemelk (NED)	Gan–Mercier	+ 4' 33"
3	Raymond Delisle (FRA)	Peugeot–Esso	+ 11' 25"
4	Raymond Poulidor (FRA)	Gan–Mercier	+ 11' 55"
5	Walter Riccomi (ITA)	Scic–Fiat	+ 11' 57"
6	Michel Pollentier (BEL)	Velda–Flandria	+ 13' 03"
7	Freddy Maertens (BEL)	Velda–Flandria	+ 13' 28"
8	Francisco Galdós (ESP)	Kas–Campagnolo	+ 14' 20"
9	Fausto Bertoglio (ITA)	Jolly Ceramica	+ 14' 24"
10	José Pesarrodona (ESP)	Kas–Campagnolo	+ 15' 46"

== Stage 19 ==
15 July 1976 – Sainte-Foy-la-Grande to Tulle, 220 km (140 mi)

Stage 19 result

Rank	Rider	Team	Time
1	Hubert Mathis (FRA)	Miko–Superia	6h 46' 00"
2	Enrico Paolini (ITA)	Scic–Fiat	+ 7"
3	Gerard Vianen (NED)	Gan–Mercier	s.t.
4	Adriano Passuello (ITA)	Brooklyn	s.t.
5	Donato Giuliani (ITA)	Jolly Ceramica	s.t.
6	Antonio Menéndez (ESP)	Kas–Campagnolo	s.t.
7	Antonio Martos (ESP)	Kas–Campagnolo	s.t.
8	Jean-Pierre Genet (FRA)	Gan–Mercier	s.t.
9	Pedro Torres (ESP)	Super Ser	s.t.
10	Ferdinand Julien (FRA)	Lejeune–BP	+ 7' 06"

General classification after stage 19

Rank	Rider	Team	Time
1	Lucien Van Impe (BEL)	Gitane–Campagnolo	103h 06' 20"
2	Joop Zoetemelk (NED)	Gan–Mercier	+ 4' 33"
3	Raymond Delisle (FRA)	Peugeot–Esso	+ 11' 25"
4	Raymond Poulidor (FRA)	Gan–Mercier	+ 11' 55"
5	Walter Riccomi (ITA)	Scic–Fiat	+ 11' 57"
6	Michel Pollentier (BEL)	Velda–Flandria	+ 13' 03"
7	Freddy Maertens (BEL)	Velda–Flandria	+ 13' 28"
8	Francisco Galdós (ESP)	Kas–Campagnolo	+ 14' 20"
9	Fausto Bertoglio (ITA)	Jolly Ceramica	+ 14' 24"
10	José Pesarrodona (ESP)	Kas–Campagnolo	+ 15' 46"

== Stage 20 ==
16 July 1976 – Tulle to Puy de Dôme, 220 km (140 mi)

Stage 20 result

Rank	Rider	Team	Time
1	Joop Zoetemelk (NED)	Gan–Mercier	6h 52' 52"
2	Lucien Van Impe (BEL)	Gitane–Campagnolo	+ 12"
3	Francisco Galdós (ESP)	Kas–Campagnolo	+ 25"
4	Raymond Poulidor (FRA)	Gan–Mercier	+ 32"
5	Walter Riccomi (ITA)	Scic–Fiat	+ 42"
6	Raymond Delisle (FRA)	Peugeot–Esso	+ 1' 02"
7	Raymond Martin (FRA)	Gitane–Campagnolo	+ 1' 16"
8	Antonio Martos (ESP)	Kas–Campagnolo	+ 1' 22"
9	Mariano Martínez (FRA)	Lejeune–BP	+ 1' 43"
10	Vicente López Carril (ESP)	Kas–Campagnolo	+ 1' 48"

General classification after stage 20

Rank	Rider	Team	Time
1	Lucien Van Impe (BEL)	Gitane–Campagnolo	109h 59' 24"
2	Joop Zoetemelk (NED)	Gan–Mercier	+ 4' 21"
3	Raymond Poulidor (FRA)	Gan–Mercier	+ 12' 15"
4	Raymond Delisle (FRA)	Peugeot–Esso	s.t.
5	Walter Riccomi (ITA)	Scic–Fiat	+ 12' 27"
6	Francisco Galdós (ESP)	Kas–Campagnolo	+ 14' 33"
7	Michel Pollentier (BEL)	Velda–Flandria	+ 15' 05"
8	Freddy Maertens (BEL)	Velda–Flandria	+ 16' 24"
9	Fausto Bertoglio (ITA)	Jolly Ceramica	+ 16' 30"
10	Vicente López Carril (ESP)	Kas–Campagnolo	+ 19' 17"

== Stage 21 ==
17 July 1976 – Montargis to Versailles, 145 km (90 mi)

Stage 21 result

Rank	Rider	Team	Time
1	Freddy Maertens (BEL)	Velda–Flandria	4h 16' 07"
2	Piero Gavazzi (ITA)	Jolly Ceramica	s.t.
3	Enrico Paolini (ITA)	Scic–Fiat	s.t.
4	Régis Delépine (FRA)	Gan–Mercier	s.t.
5	Jacques Esclassan (FRA)	Peugeot–Esso	s.t.
6	Robert Mintkiewicz (FRA)	Gitane–Campagnolo	s.t.
7	Gerben Karstens (NED)	TI–Raleigh	s.t.
8	Mariano Martínez (FRA)	Lejeune–BP	s.t.
9	Marc Demeyer (BEL)	Velda–Flandria	s.t.
10	Michel Le Denmat (FRA)	Lejeune–BP	s.t.

General classification after stage 21

Rank	Rider	Team	Time
1	Lucien Van Impe (BEL)	Gitane–Campagnolo	114h 15' 31"
2	Joop Zoetemelk (NED)	Gan–Mercier	+ 4' 21"
3	Raymond Poulidor (FRA)	Gan–Mercier	+ 12' 15"
4	Raymond Delisle (FRA)	Peugeot–Esso	s.t.
5	Walter Riccomi (ITA)	Scic–Fiat	+ 12' 27"
6	Francisco Galdós (ESP)	Kas–Campagnolo	+ 14' 33"
7	Michel Pollentier (BEL)	Velda–Flandria	+ 15' 05"
8	Freddy Maertens (BEL)	Velda–Flandria	+ 16' 24"
9	Fausto Bertoglio (ITA)	Jolly Ceramica	+ 16' 30"
10	Vicente López Carril (ESP)	Kas–Campagnolo	+ 19' 14"

== Stage 22a ==
18 July 1976 – Paris to Paris, 6 km (3.7 mi) (ITT)

Stage 22a result

Rank	Rider	Team	Time
1	Freddy Maertens (BEL)	Velda–Flandria	7' 46"
2	Joop Zoetemelk (NED)	Gan–Mercier	+ 11"
3	Raymond Poulidor (FRA)	Gan–Mercier	s.t.
4	Michel Pollentier (BEL)	Velda–Flandria	+ 12"
5	Lucien Van Impe (BEL)	Gitane–Campagnolo	+ 18"
6	Raymond Delisle (FRA)	Peugeot–Esso	+ 20"
7	José Pesarrodona (ESP)	Kas–Campagnolo	+ 23"
8	Fausto Bertoglio (ITA)	Jolly Ceramica	+ 24"
=9	Knut Knudsen (NOR)	Jolly Ceramica	+ 25"
=9	Bert Pronk (NED)	TI–Raleigh	s.t.

General classification after stage 22a

Rank	Rider	Team	Time
1	Lucien Van Impe (BEL)	Gitane–Campagnolo	114h 23' 35"
2	Joop Zoetemelk (NED)	Gan–Mercier	+ 4' 14"
3	Raymond Poulidor (FRA)	Gan–Mercier	+ 12' 08"
4	Raymond Delisle (FRA)	Peugeot–Esso	+ 12' 17"
5	Walter Riccomi (ITA)	Scic–Fiat	+ 12' 39"
6	Francisco Galdós (ESP)	Kas–Campagnolo	+ 14' 50"
7	Michel Pollentier (BEL)	Velda–Flandria	+ 14' 59"
8	Freddy Maertens (BEL)	Velda–Flandria	+ 16' 06"
9	Fausto Bertoglio (ITA)	Jolly Ceramica	+ 16' 36"
10	Vicente López Carril (ESP)	Kas–Campagnolo	+ 19' 28"

== Stage 22b ==
18 July 1976 – Paris to Paris Champs-Élysées, 91 km (57 mi)

Stage 22b result

Rank	Rider	Team	Time
1	Gerben Karstens (NED)	TI–Raleigh	1h 58' 48"
2	Freddy Maertens (BEL)	Velda–Flandria	s.t.
3	Piero Gavazzi (ITA)	Jolly Ceramica	s.t.
4	Régis Delépine (FRA)	Gan–Mercier	s.t.
5	Willy Teirlinck (BEL)	Gitane–Campagnolo	s.t.
6	Herman Van der Slagmolen (BEL)	Brooklyn	s.t.
7	Gerard Vianen (NED)	Gan–Mercier	s.t.
8	Jacques Esclassan (FRA)	Peugeot–Esso	s.t.
9	Robert Mintkiewicz (FRA)	Gitane–Campagnolo	s.t.
10	Marcello Osler (ITA)	Brooklyn	s.t.

General classification after stage 22b

Rank	Rider	Team	Time
1	Lucien Van Impe (BEL)	Gitane–Campagnolo	116h 22' 23"
2	Joop Zoetemelk (NED)	Gan–Mercier	+ 4' 14"
3	Raymond Poulidor (FRA)	Gan–Mercier	+ 12' 08"
4	Raymond Delisle (FRA)	Peugeot–Esso	+ 12' 17"
5	Walter Riccomi (ITA)	Scic–Fiat	+ 12' 39"
6	Francisco Galdós (ESP)	Kas–Campagnolo	+ 14' 50"
7	Michel Pollentier (BEL)	Velda–Flandria	+ 14' 59"
8	Freddy Maertens (BEL)	Velda–Flandria	+ 16' 09"
9	Fausto Bertoglio (ITA)	Jolly Ceramica	+ 16' 36"
10	Vicente López Carril (ESP)	Kas–Campagnolo	+ 19' 28"
