= 1976 Tour de France, Prologue to Stage 12 =

Cycling race stages

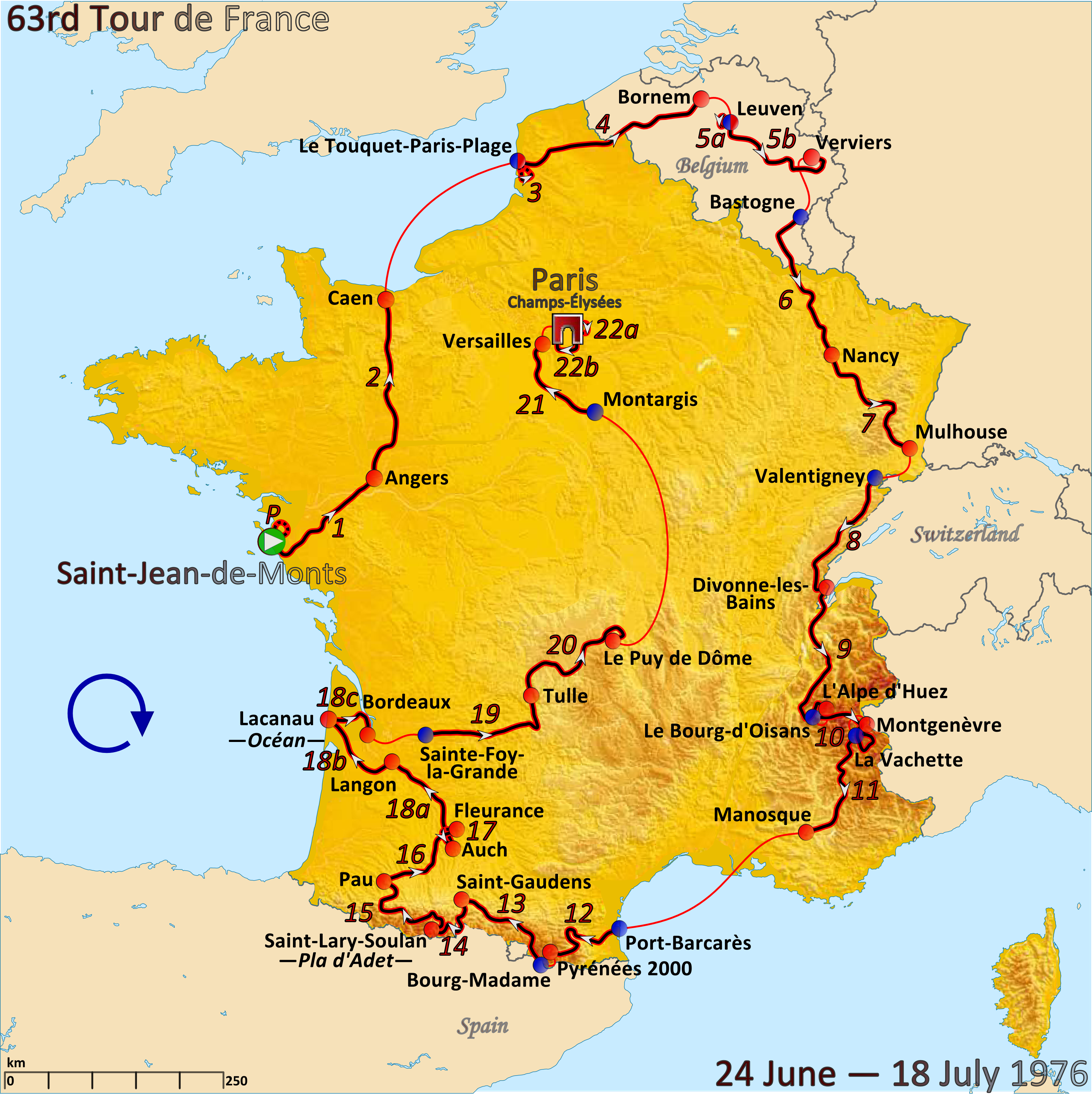
Route of the 1976 Tour de France

The 1976 Tour de France was the 63rd edition of the Tour de France, one of cycling's Grand Tours. The Tour began in Saint-Jean-de-Monts with a prologue individual time trial on 24 June, and Stage 12 occurred on 8 July with a mountainous stage to Pyrénées 2000. The race finished in Paris on 18 July.

== Prologue ==
24 June 1976 – Saint-Jean-de-Monts to Saint-Jean-de-Monts, 8 km (5.0 mi) (ITT)

Prologue result and general classification after prologue

Rank	Rider	Team	Time
1	Freddy Maertens (BEL)	Velda–Flandria	11' 03"
2	Jesús Manzaneque (ESP)	Super Ser	+ 17"
3	Bernard Thévenet (FRA)	Peugeot–Esso	+ 20"
4	Bert Pronk (NED)	TI–Raleigh	s.t.
5	Gerrie Knetemann (NED)	TI–Raleigh	+ 21"
6	Michel Pollentier (BEL)	Velda–Flandria	s.t.
7	Joop Zoetemelk (NED)	Gan–Mercier	+ 22"
8	Raymond Poulidor (FRA)	Gan–Mercier	+ 27"
9	Giancarlo Bellini (ITA)	Brooklyn	+ 28"
10	Yves Hézard (FRA)	Gan–Mercier	s.t.

== Stage 1 ==
25 June 1976 – Saint-Jean-de-Monts to Angers, 173 km (107 mi)

Stage 1 result

Rank	Rider	Team	Time
1	Freddy Maertens (BEL)	Velda–Flandria	4h 43' 37"
2	Régis Delépine (FRA)	Gan–Mercier	s.t.
3	Ercole Gualazzini (ITA)	Brooklyn	s.t.
4	Gerben Karstens (NED)	TI–Raleigh	s.t.
5	Jan van Katwijk (NED)	TI–Raleigh	s.t.
6	Jacques Esclassan (FRA)	Peugeot–Esso	s.t.
7	Piero Gavazzi (ITA)	Jolly Ceramica	s.t.
8	Piet van Katwijk (NED)	TI–Raleigh	s.t.
9	Robert Mintkiewicz (FRA)	Gitane–Campagnolo	s.t.
10	Luciano Borgognoni (ITA)	Brooklyn	s.t.

General classification after stage 1

Rank	Rider	Team	Time
1	Freddy Maertens (BEL)	Velda–Flandria	4h 54' 40"
2	Jesús Manzaneque (ESP)	Super Ser	+ 17"
3	Bernard Thévenet (FRA)	Peugeot–Esso	+ 20"
4	Bert Pronk (NED)	TI–Raleigh	s.t.
5	Michel Pollentier (BEL)	Velda–Flandria	+ 21"
6	Joop Zoetemelk (NED)	Gan–Mercier	+ 22"
7	Raymond Poulidor (FRA)	Gan–Mercier	+ 27"
8	Luis Ocaña (ESP)	Super Ser	+ 28"
9	Giancarlo Bellini (ITA)	Brooklyn	s.t.
10	Yves Hézard (FRA)	Gan–Mercier	s.t.

== Stage 2 ==
26 June 1976 – Angers to Caen, 237 km (147 mi)

Stage 2 result

Rank	Rider	Team	Time
1	Giovanni Battaglin (ITA)	Jolly Ceramica	6h 43' 49"
2	Piero Gavazzi (ITA)	Jolly Ceramica	+ 10"
3	Jan Raas (NED)	TI–Raleigh	s.t.
4	Freddy Maertens (BEL)	Velda–Flandria	s.t.
5	Jacques Esclassan (FRA)	Peugeot–Esso	s.t.
6	Régis Delépine (FRA)	Gan–Mercier	s.t.
7	Luciano Borgognoni (ITA)	Brooklyn	s.t.
8	Ercole Gualazzini (ITA)	Brooklyn	s.t.
9	Robert Mintkiewicz (FRA)	Gitane–Campagnolo	s.t.
10	Gerben Karstens (NED)	TI–Raleigh	s.t.

General classification after stage 2

Rank	Rider	Team	Time
1	Freddy Maertens (BEL)	Velda–Flandria	11h 38' 39"
2	Jesús Manzaneque (ESP)	Super Ser	+ 17"
3	Bernard Thévenet (FRA)	Peugeot–Esso	+ 20"
4	Bert Pronk (NED)	TI–Raleigh	s.t.
5	Michel Pollentier (BEL)	Velda–Flandria	+ 21"
6	Joop Zoetemelk (NED)	Gan–Mercier	+ 22"
7	Raymond Poulidor (FRA)	Gan–Mercier	+ 27"
8	Luis Ocaña (ESP)	Super Ser	+ 28"
9	Yves Hézard (FRA)	Gan–Mercier	s.t.
10	Giancarlo Bellini (ITA)	Brooklyn	s.t.

== Stage 3 ==
27 June 1976 – Le Touquet-Paris-Plage to Le Touquet-Paris-Plage, 37 km (23 mi) (ITT)

Stage 3 result

Rank	Rider	Team	Time
1	Freddy Maertens (BEL)	Velda–Flandria	47' 08"
2	Michel Pollentier (BEL)	Velda–Flandria	+ 1' 37"
3	Roy Schuiten (NED)	Lejeune–BP	+ 2' 01"
4	Jesús Manzaneque (ESP)	Super Ser	+ 2' 12"
5	Ferdinand Bracke (BEL)	Lejeune–BP	+ 2' 23"
6	Bert Pronk (NED)	TI–Raleigh	+ 2' 26"
7	Jean-Pierre Danguillaume (FRA)	Peugeot–Esso	+ 2' 39"
8	Ronald De Witte (BEL)	Brooklyn	+ 2' 41"
9	Hennie Kuiper (NED)	TI–Raleigh	+ 2' 57"
10	Raymond Poulidor (FRA)	Gan–Mercier	+ 2' 58"

General classification after stage 3

Rank	Rider	Team	Time
1	Freddy Maertens (BEL)	Velda–Flandria	12h 25' 47"
2	Michel Pollentier (BEL)	Velda–Flandria	+ 1' 58"
3	Jesús Manzaneque (ESP)	Super Ser	+ 2' 29"
4	Roy Schuiten (NED)	Lejeune–BP	+ 2' 32"
5	Bert Pronk (NED)	TI–Raleigh	+ 2' 46"
6	Ferdinand Bracke (BEL)	Lejeune–BP	+ 2' 55"
7	Raymond Poulidor (FRA)	Gan–Mercier	+ 3' 25"
8	Jean-Pierre Danguillaume (FRA)	Peugeot–Esso	+ 3' 26"
9	Yves Hézard (FRA)	Gan–Mercier	+ 3' 30"
10	Hennie Kuiper (NED)	TI–Raleigh	+ 3' 34"

== Stage 4 ==
28 June 1976 – Le Touquet-Paris-Plage to Bornem, 258 km (160 mi)

Stage 4 result

Rank	Rider	Team	Time
1	Hennie Kuiper (NED)	TI–Raleigh	7h 31' 25"
2	Eric Loder (SUI)	Velda–Flandria	s.t.
3	Piero Gavazzi (ITA)	Jolly Ceramica	+ 9"
4	Guy Sibille (FRA)	Peugeot–Esso	s.t.
5	Gerard Vianen (NED)	Gan–Mercier	s.t.
6	Jan Raas (NED)	TI–Raleigh	+ 11"
7	Wladimiro Panizza (ITA)	Scic–Fiat	s.t.
8	Freddy Maertens (BEL)	Velda–Flandria	+ 14"
9	Ercole Gualazzini (ITA)	Brooklyn	s.t.
10	Jacques Esclassan (FRA)	Peugeot–Esso	s.t.

General classification after stage 4

Rank	Rider	Team	Time
1	Freddy Maertens (BEL)	Velda–Flandria	19h 57' 26"
2	Michel Pollentier (BEL)	Velda–Flandria	+ 1' 58"
3	Jesús Manzaneque (ESP)	Super Ser	+ 2' 29"
4	Roy Schuiten (NED)	Lejeune–BP	+ 2' 32"
5	Bert Pronk (NED)	TI–Raleigh	+ 2' 46"
6	Ferdinand Bracke (BEL)	Lejeune–BP	+ 2' 55"
7	Hennie Kuiper (NED)	TI–Raleigh	+ 3' 20"
8	Raymond Poulidor (FRA)	Gan–Mercier	+ 3' 25"
9	Jean-Pierre Danguillaume (FRA)	Peugeot–Esso	+ 3' 26"
10	Yves Hézard (FRA)	Gan–Mercier	+ 3' 30"

== Stage 5a ==
29 June 1976 – Leuven to Leuven, 4 km (2.5 mi) (TTT)

Stage 5a result

Rank	Team	Time
1	TI–Raleigh	26' 49"
2	Velda–Flandria	+ 5"
3	Peugeot–Esso	+ 20"
4	Gan–Mercier	+ 28"
5	Scic–Fiat	+ 32"
6	Jolly Ceramica	+ 52"
7	Lejeune–BP	+ 55"
8	Brooklyn	+ 59"
9	Kas–Campagnolo	+ 1' 17"
10	Gitane–Campagnolo	+ 1' 25"

General classification after stage 5a

Rank	Rider	Team	Time
1	Freddy Maertens (BEL)	Velda–Flandria	19h 57' 20"
2	Michel Pollentier (BEL)	Velda–Flandria	+ 2' 04"
3	Jesús Manzaneque (ESP)	Super Ser	+ 2' 35"
4	Roy Schuiten (NED)	Lejeune–BP	+ 2' 38"
5	Bert Pronk (NED)	TI–Raleigh	+ 2' 42"
6	Ferdinand Bracke (BEL)	Lejeune–BP	+ 3' 01"
7	Hennie Kuiper (NED)	TI–Raleigh	+ 3' 16"
8	Jean-Pierre Danguillaume (FRA)	Peugeot–Esso	+ 3' 29"
9	Raymond Poulidor (FRA)	Gan–Mercier	+ 3' 31"
10	Yves Hézard (FRA)	Gan–Mercier	+ 3' 36"

== Stage 5b ==
29 June 1976 – Leuven to Verviers, 144 km (89 mi)

Stage 5b result

Rank	Rider	Team	Time
1	Miguel María Lasa (ESP)	Scic–Fiat	3h 51' 17"
2	Guy Sibille (FRA)	Peugeot–Esso	s.t.
3	Michel Périn (FRA)	Gan–Mercier	+ 8"
4	Antonio Martos (ESP)	Kas–Campagnolo	s.t.
5	Patrick Béon (FRA)	Peugeot–Esso	s.t.
6	Freddy Maertens (BEL)	Velda–Flandria	+ 33"
7	Jacques Esclassan (FRA)	Peugeot–Esso	s.t.
8	Ronald De Witte (BEL)	Brooklyn	s.t.
9	Hennie Kuiper (NED)	TI–Raleigh	s.t.
10	Mariano Martínez (FRA)	Lejeune–BP	s.t.

General classification after stage 5b

Rank	Rider	Team	Time
1	Freddy Maertens (BEL)	Velda–Flandria	23h 49' 10"
2	Michel Pollentier (BEL)	Velda–Flandria	+ 2' 04"
3	Hennie Kuiper (NED)	TI–Raleigh	+ 3' 16"
4	Jesús Manzaneque (ESP)	Super Ser	+ 3' 25"
5	Roy Schuiten (NED)	Lejeune–BP	+ 3' 28"
6	Jean-Pierre Danguillaume (FRA)	Peugeot–Esso	+ 3' 29"
7	Raymond Poulidor (FRA)	Gan–Mercier	+ 3' 31"
8	Bert Pronk (NED)	TI–Raleigh	+ 3' 32"
9	Ronald De Witte (BEL)	Brooklyn	+ 3' 45"
10	Giancarlo Bellini (ITA)	Brooklyn	+ 3' 48"

== Stage 6 ==
30 June 1976 – Bastogne to Nancy, 209 km (130 mi)

Stage 6 result

Rank	Rider	Team	Time
1	Aldo Parecchini (ITA)	Brooklyn	5h 22' 32"
2	Enrico Paolini (ITA)	Scic–Fiat	+ 4' 29"
3	Gerrie Knetemann (NED)	TI–Raleigh	s.t.
4	Mariano Martínez (FRA)	Lejeune–BP	+ 4' 31"
5	Georges Talbourdet (FRA)	Gan–Mercier	s.t.
6	Raymond Delisle (FRA)	Peugeot–Esso	s.t.
7	José Viejo (ESP)	Super Ser	+ 4' 38"
8	Antonio Menéndez (ESP)	Kas–Campagnolo	+ 4' 41"
9	Freddy Maertens (BEL)	Velda–Flandria	s.t.
10	Gianbattista Baronchelli (ITA)	Scic–Fiat	s.t.

General classification after stage 6

Rank	Rider	Team	Time
1	Freddy Maertens (BEL)	Velda–Flandria	29h 16' 23"
2	Michel Pollentier (BEL)	Velda–Flandria	+ 2' 04"
3	Hennie Kuiper (NED)	TI–Raleigh	+ 3' 16"
4	Jesús Manzaneque (ESP)	Super Ser	+ 3' 25"
5	Roy Schuiten (NED)	Lejeune–BP	+ 3' 28"
6	Jean-Pierre Danguillaume (FRA)	Peugeot–Esso	+ 3' 29"
7	Raymond Poulidor (FRA)	Gan–Mercier	+ 3' 31"
8	Bert Pronk (NED)	TI–Raleigh	+ 3' 32"
9	Ronald De Witte (BEL)	Brooklyn	+ 3' 45"
10	Giancarlo Bellini (ITA)	Brooklyn	+ 3' 48"

== Stage 7 ==
1 July 1976 – Nancy to Mulhouse, 206 km (128 mi)

Stage 7 result

Rank	Rider	Team	Time
1	Freddy Maertens (BEL)	Velda–Flandria	5h 41' 12"
2	Jacques Esclassan (FRA)	Peugeot–Esso	s.t.
3	Piero Gavazzi (ITA)	Jolly Ceramica	s.t.
4	Hennie Kuiper (NED)	TI–Raleigh	s.t.
5	Michel Le Denmat (FRA)	Lejeune–BP	s.t.
6	Walter Riccomi (ITA)	Scic–Fiat	s.t.
7	Raymond Poulidor (FRA)	Gan–Mercier	s.t.
8	Michel Périn (FRA)	Gan–Mercier	s.t.
9	Wladimiro Panizza (ITA)	Scic–Fiat	s.t.
10	Maurice Le Guilloux (FRA)	Gan–Mercier	s.t.

General classification after stage 7

Rank	Rider	Team	Time
1	Freddy Maertens (BEL)	Velda–Flandria	34h 57' 35"
2	Michel Pollentier (BEL)	Velda–Flandria	+ 2' 04"
3	Hennie Kuiper (NED)	TI–Raleigh	+ 3' 16"
4	Jean-Pierre Danguillaume (FRA)	Peugeot–Esso	+ 3' 23"
5	Raymond Poulidor (FRA)	Gan–Mercier	+ 3' 31"
6	Bert Pronk (NED)	TI–Raleigh	+ 3' 32"
7	Ronald De Witte (BEL)	Brooklyn	+ 3' 45"
8	Giancarlo Bellini (ITA)	Brooklyn	+ 3' 48"
9	Gianbattista Baronchelli (ITA)	Scic–Fiat	+ 3' 51"
10	Lucien Van Impe (BEL)	Gitane–Campagnolo	+ 3' 54"

== Stage 8 ==
2 July 1976 – Valentigney to Divonne-les-Bains, 220 km (140 mi)

Stage 8 result

Rank	Rider	Team	Time
1	Jacques Esclassan (FRA)	Peugeot–Esso	5h 54' 11"
2	Freddy Maertens (BEL)	Velda–Flandria	s.t.
3	Piero Gavazzi (ITA)	Jolly Ceramica	s.t.
4	Enrico Paolini (ITA)	Scic–Fiat	s.t.
5	Miguel María Lasa (ESP)	Scic–Fiat	s.t.
6	Robert Mintkiewicz (FRA)	Gitane–Campagnolo	s.t.
7	Yves Hézard (FRA)	Gan–Mercier	s.t.
8	Luciano Borgognoni (ITA)	Brooklyn	s.t.
9	Ronald De Witte (BEL)	Brooklyn	s.t.
10	Herman Van der Slagmolen (BEL)	Brooklyn	s.t.

General classification after stage 8

Rank	Rider	Team	Time
1	Freddy Maertens (BEL)	Velda–Flandria	40h 51' 46"
2	Michel Pollentier (BEL)	Velda–Flandria	+ 2' 04"
3	Hennie Kuiper (NED)	TI–Raleigh	+ 3' 16"
4	Jean-Pierre Danguillaume (FRA)	Peugeot–Esso	+ 3' 23"
5	Raymond Poulidor (FRA)	Gan–Mercier	+ 3' 31"
6	Bert Pronk (NED)	TI–Raleigh	+ 3' 32"
7	Ronald De Witte (BEL)	Brooklyn	+ 3' 45"
8	Giancarlo Bellini (ITA)	Brooklyn	+ 3' 48"
9	Gianbattista Baronchelli (ITA)	Scic–Fiat	+ 3' 51"
10	Lucien Van Impe (BEL)	Gitane–Campagnolo	+ 3' 54"

== Rest day 1 ==
3 July 1976 – Divonne-les-Bains

== Stage 9 ==
4 July 1976 – Divonne-les-Bains to Alpe d'Huez, 258 km (160 mi)

Stage 9 result

Rank	Rider	Team	Time
1	Joop Zoetemelk (NED)	Gan–Mercier	8h 31' 49"
2	Lucien Van Impe (BEL)	Gitane–Campagnolo	+ 3"
3	Francisco Galdós (ESP)	Kas–Campagnolo	+ 58"
4	André Romero (FRA)	Jobo–Wolber–La France	+ 1' 38"
5	Fausto Bertoglio (ITA)	Jolly Ceramica	+ 1' 45"
6	Gianbattista Baronchelli (ITA)	Scic–Fiat	s.t.
7	José Martins (POR)	Kas–Campagnolo	+ 1' 50"
8	Bernard Thévenet (FRA)	Peugeot–Esso	s.t.
9	Raymond Poulidor (FRA)	Gan–Mercier	s.t.
10	Walter Riccomi (ITA)	Scic–Fiat	+ 2' 00"

General classification after stage 9

Rank	Rider	Team	Time
1	Lucien Van Impe (BEL)	Gitane–Campagnolo	49h 27' 32"
2	Joop Zoetemelk (NED)	Gan–Mercier	+ 8"
3	Freddy Maertens (BEL)	Velda–Flandria	+ 54"
4	Raymond Poulidor (FRA)	Gan–Mercier	+ 1' 24"
5	Gianbattista Baronchelli (ITA)	Scic–Fiat	+ 1' 39"
6	Bernard Thévenet (FRA)	Peugeot–Esso	+ 1' 48"
7	Fausto Bertoglio (ITA)	Jolly Ceramica	+ 1' 53"
8	Francisco Galdós (ESP)	Kas–Campagnolo	+ 1' 55"
9	Giancarlo Bellini (ITA)	Brooklyn	+ 2' 31"
10	Michel Pollentier (BEL)	Velda–Flandria	+ 2' 58"

== Stage 10 ==
5 July 1976 – Le Bourg-d'Oisans to Montgenèvre, 166 km (103 mi)

Stage 10 result

Rank	Rider	Team	Time
1	Joop Zoetemelk (NED)	Gan–Mercier	5h 02' 20"
2	Bernard Thévenet (FRA)	Peugeot–Esso	+ 1"
3	Lucien Van Impe (BEL)	Gitane–Campagnolo	s.t.
4	Francisco Galdós (ESP)	Kas–Campagnolo	+ 10"
5	Fausto Bertoglio (ITA)	Jolly Ceramica	+ 13"
6	Raymond Poulidor (FRA)	Gan–Mercier	s.t.
7	Hennie Kuiper (NED)	TI–Raleigh	+ 27"
8	Raymond Delisle (FRA)	Peugeot–Esso	+ 31"
9	Michel Pollentier (BEL)	Velda–Flandria	+ 1' 05"
10	Marco Bergamo (ITA)	Jolly Ceramica	+ 1' 27"

General classification after stage 10

Rank	Rider	Team	Time
1	Lucien Van Impe (BEL)	Gitane–Campagnolo	54h 29' 53"
2	Joop Zoetemelk (NED)	Gan–Mercier	+ 7"
3	Raymond Poulidor (FRA)	Gan–Mercier	+ 1' 36"
4	Bernard Thévenet (FRA)	Peugeot–Esso	+ 1' 48"
5	Francisco Galdós (ESP)	Kas–Campagnolo	+ 2' 04"
6	Fausto Bertoglio (ITA)	Jolly Ceramica	+ 2' 05"
7	Michel Pollentier (BEL)	Velda–Flandria	+ 4' 02"
8	Raymond Delisle (FRA)	Peugeot–Esso	+ 4' 17"
9	Hennie Kuiper (NED)	TI–Raleigh	+ 4' 36"
10	José Martins (POR)	Kas–Campagnolo	+ 4' 56"

== Stage 11 ==
6 July 1976 – Montgenèvre to Manosque, 224 km (139 mi)

Stage 11 result

Rank	Rider	Team	Time
1	José Viejo (ESP)	Super Ser	5h 42' 34"
2	Gerben Karstens (NED)	TI–Raleigh	+ 22' 50"
3	Freddy Maertens (BEL)	Velda–Flandria	+ 23' 07"
4	Wladimiro Panizza (ITA)	Scic–Fiat	s.t.
5	Gianbattista Baronchelli (ITA)	Scic–Fiat	s.t.
6	Raymond Delisle (FRA)	Peugeot–Esso	s.t.
7	Hennie Kuiper (NED)	TI–Raleigh	s.t.
8	Michel Pollentier (BEL)	Velda–Flandria	s.t.
9	Guy Sibille (FRA)	Peugeot–Esso	s.t.
10	José Martins (POR)	Kas–Campagnolo	s.t.

General classification after stage 11

Rank	Rider	Team	Time
1	Lucien Van Impe (BEL)	Gitane–Campagnolo	60h 35' 34"
2	Joop Zoetemelk (NED)	Gan–Mercier	+ 7"
3	Raymond Poulidor (FRA)	Gan–Mercier	+ 1' 36"
4	Bernard Thévenet (FRA)	Peugeot–Esso	+ 1' 48"
5	Francisco Galdós (ESP)	Kas–Campagnolo	+ 2' 04"
6	Fausto Bertoglio (ITA)	Jolly Ceramica	+ 2' 05"
7	Michel Pollentier (BEL)	Velda–Flandria	+ 4' 02"
8	Raymond Delisle (FRA)	Peugeot–Esso	+ 4' 17"
9	Hennie Kuiper (NED)	TI–Raleigh	+ 4' 36"
10	José Martins (POR)	Kas–Campagnolo	+ 4' 56"

== Rest day 2 ==
7 July 1976 – Le Barcarès

== Stage 12 ==
8 July 1976 – Le Barcarès to Pyrénées 2000, 205 km (127 mi)

Stage 12 result

Rank	Rider	Team	Time
1	Raymond Delisle (FRA)	Peugeot–Esso	6h 47' 32"
2	Antonio Menéndez (ESP)	Kas–Campagnolo	+ 4' 59"
3	Wladimiro Panizza (ITA)	Scic–Fiat	+ 5' 14"
4	Bert Pronk (NED)	TI–Raleigh	+ 6' 24"
5	Michel Pollentier (BEL)	Velda–Flandria	+ 6' 26"
6	Luciano Conati (ITA)	Scic–Fiat	+ 6' 47"
7	Joop Zoetemelk (NED)	Gan–Mercier	+ 6' 57"
8	José Viejo (ESP)	Super Ser	s.t.
9	Gianbattista Baronchelli (ITA)	Scic–Fiat	+ 6' 58"
10	Raymond Poulidor (FRA)	Gan–Mercier	s.t.

General classification after stage 12

Rank	Rider	Team	Time
1	Raymond Delisle (FRA)	Peugeot–Esso	67h 27' 23"
2	Lucien Van Impe (BEL)	Gitane–Campagnolo	+ 2' 41"
3	Joop Zoetemelk (NED)	Gan–Mercier	+ 2' 47"
4	Raymond Poulidor (FRA)	Gan–Mercier	+ 4' 17"
5	Francisco Galdós (ESP)	Kas–Campagnolo	+ 4' 45"
6	Bernard Thévenet (FRA)	Peugeot–Esso	+ 4' 53"
7	Fausto Bertoglio (ITA)	Jolly Ceramica	+ 5' 58"
8	Michel Pollentier (BEL)	Velda–Flandria	+ 6' 11"
9	Hennie Kuiper (NED)	TI–Raleigh	+ 7' 17"
10	José Martins (POR)	Kas–Campagnolo	+ 7' 45"
