= 1976 Tour de France =

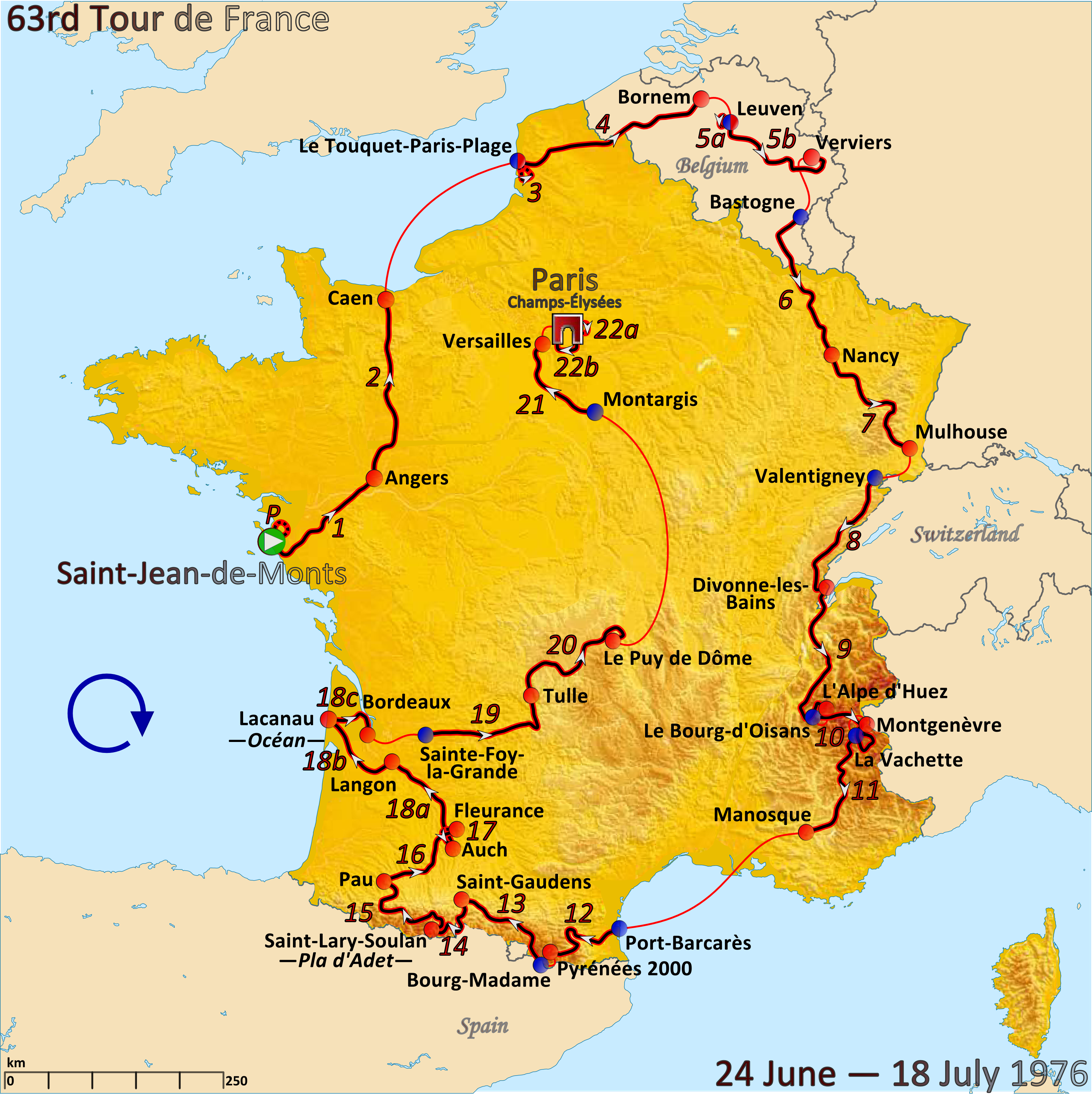
- Route of the 1976 Tour de France

Race details
- Dates: 24 June – 18 July 1976
- Stages: 22 + Prologue, including three split stages
- Distance: 4,017 km (2,496 mi)
- Winning time: 116h 22' 23"

Results
Jersey awarded to the overall winner	Winner	Lucien Van Impe (BEL)	(Gitane–Campagnolo)
	Second	Joop Zoetemelk (NED)	(Gan–Mercier–Hutchinson)
	Third	Raymond Poulidor (FRA)	(Gan–Mercier–Hutchinson)
Jersey awarded to the points classification winner	Points	Freddy Maertens (BEL)	(Flandria–Velda–West Vlaams Vleesbedrijf)
Jersey awarded to the mountains classification winner	Mountains	Giancarlo Bellini (ITA)	(Brooklyn)
Jersey awarded to the young rider classification winner	Young rider	Enrique Martínez Heredia (ESP)	(Kas–Campagnolo)
	Sprints	Robert Mintkiewicz (FRA)	(Gitane–Campagnolo)
	Combativity	Raymond Delisle (FRA)	(Peugeot–Esso–Michelin)
	Team	Kas–Campagnolo	
	Team points	Gan–Mercier–Hutchinson	

The 1976 Tour de France was the 63rd edition of the Tour de France, one of cycling's Grand Tours. It took between 24 June and 18 July, with 22 stages covering a distance of 4,017 km (2,496 mi). It was won by mountain specialist Lucien Van Impe in a battle with the previous winner Bernard Thévenet and Joop Zoetemelk. Zoetemelk won three high mountain stages including Alpe d'Huez and Puy-de-Dôme but this Tour became known for when the young directeur sportif of Van Impe, Cyrille Guimard, threatened to run Van Impe off the road with the Team Car if he didn't attack. Van Impe then attacked and won the Tour.

The revelation of the Tour however was Freddy Maertens, who in his first Tour won eight stages and the points classification, and led the general classification for ten days.

Five-time winner Eddy Merckx did not participate in the 1976 Tour de France because he was injured. 1975 winner Bernard Thévenet left the race in the 19th stage, but at that point it was already clear that Van Impe would win the race.

The mountains classification was won by Giancarlo Bellini with 170 points, only one point ahead of Lucien Van Impe. The young rider classification was won by Enrique Martínez Heredia. Heredia had already won the Tour de l'Avenir in 1974, but never broke through after this win.

== Teams ==
The 1976 Tour started with 13 teams, each sent 10 cyclists, a total of 130.

The teams entering the race were:

- Peugeot–Esso–Michelin
- Gitane–Campagnolo
- Gan–Mercier–Hutchinson
- Kas–Campagnolo
- Super Ser
- TI–Raleigh–Campagnolo
- Jobo–Spidel–Wolber–La France
- Flandria–Velda–West Vlaams Vleesbedrijf
- Miko–de Gribaldy–Superia
- Jollj Ceramica–Decor
- Lejeune–BP
- Brooklyn
- Scic–Fiat

== Pre-race favourites ==
Eddy Merckx, who already had won the Tour de France five times, had troubles to find his form in 1976, and suffered from saddle sores. He decided not to enter the 1976 Tour de France. The main favourite for the victory was now Joop Zoetemelk, who had never finished worse than fifth place in the Tour de France. The winner of the previous Tour, Bernard Thévenet, had a good spring season, winning the Dauphiné Libéré. The other former winner that was still racing, Luis Ocaña, had come second in the 1976 Vuelta a España, and was hoping to win again. Also reigning world champion Hennie Kuiper was considered a pre-race favourite.

Not considered a favorite by any means was the 40 year old 'eternal second' Raymond Poulidor, who was riding in his final Tour. While he finished a good distance behind Van Impe and Zoetemelk he surprised the rest of the field by finishing on the podium in 3rd place.

== Route and stages ==
The 1976 Tour de France started on 24 June, and had two rest days, the first in Divonne-les-Bains the second at Le Barcarès. The 1976 Tour de France was divided into 22 stages and one prologue. Of the 22 stages, three were split stages: stages 5 and 22 were split into two half stages, and stage 18 was split into three smaller stages. The highest point of elevation in the race was 2,115 m (6,939 ft) at the summit of the Col du Tourmalet mountain pass on stage 15. (Note: Before the 1976 Tour de France, the Galibier was stated by the media to be the highest climb of the route but it was closed earlier in the year for repairs to the summit tunnel.)

Stage 18a was originally scheduled to be 47 km longer, but after the 17th stage, the Tour direction saw that cyclists were exhausted, and shortened the stage.

Stage characteristics and winners
Stage	Date	Course	Distance	Type	Winner
P	24 June	Saint-Jean-de-Monts	8 km (5 mi)	Individual time trial	Freddy Maertens (BEL)
1	25 June	Saint-Jean-de-Monts to Angers	173 km (107 mi)	Flat Stage	Freddy Maertens (BEL)
2	26 June	Angers to Caen	237 km (147 mi)	Flat Stage	Giovanni Battaglin (ITA)
3	27 June	Le Touquet-Paris-Plage to Le Touquet-Paris-Plage	37 km (23 mi)	Individual time trial	Freddy Maertens (BEL)
4	28 June	Le Touquet-Paris-Plage to Bornem (Belgium)	258 km (160 mi)	Flat Stage	Hennie Kuiper (NED)
5a	29 June	Leuven (Belgium) to Leuven (Belgium)	4 km (2 mi)	Team time trial	(Netherlands) TI–Raleigh–Campagnolo
5b	29 June	Leuven (Belgium) to Verviers (Belgium)	144 km (89 mi)	Half Stage	Miguel María Lasa (ESP)
6	30 June	Bastogne to Nancy	209 km (130 mi)	Flat Stage	Aldo Parecchini (ITA)
7	1 July	Nancy to Mulhouse	206 km (128 mi)	Hilly Stage	Freddy Maertens (BEL)
8	2 July	Valentigney to Divonne-les-Bains	220 km (137 mi)	Hilly Stage	Jacques Esclassan (FRA)
	3 July	Divonne-les-Bains		Rest day	
9	4 July	Divonne-les-Bains to Alpe d'Huez	258 km (160 mi)	Mountain Stage	Joop Zoetemelk (NED)
10	5 July	Le Bourg-d'Oisans to Montgenèvre	166 km (103 mi)	Mountain Stage	Joop Zoetemelk (NED)
11	6 July	Montgenèvre to Manosque	224 km (139 mi)	Mountain Stage	José Viejo (ESP)
	7 July	Le Barcarès		Rest day	
12	8 July	Le Barcarès to Bolquères Pyrenees 2000	205 km (127 mi)	Mountain Stage	Raymond Delisle (FRA)
13	9 July	Font-Romeu-Odeillo-Via to Saint-Gaudens	188 km (117 mi)	Mountain Stage	Willy Teirlinck (BEL)
14	10 July	Saint-Gaudens to Saint-Lary-Soulan	139 km (86 mi)	Mountain Stage	Lucien Van Impe (BEL)
15	11 July	Saint-Lary-Soulan to Pau	195 km (121 mi)	Mountain Stage	Wladimiro Panizza (ITA)
16	12 July	Pau to Fleurance	152 km (94 mi)	Flat Stage	Michel Pollentier (BEL)
17	13 July	Fleurance to Auch	39 km (24 mi)	Individual time trial	Ferdinand Bracke (BEL)
18a	14 July	Auch to Langon	86 km (53 mi)	Half Stage	Freddy Maertens (BEL)
18b	14 July	Langon to Lacanau	123 km (76 mi)	Half Stage	Freddy Maertens (BEL)
18c	14 July	Lacanau to Bordeaux	70 km (43 mi)	Half Stage	Gerben Karstens (NED)
19	15 July	Sainte-Foy-la-Grande to Tulle	220 km (137 mi)	Flat Stage	Hubert Mathis (FRA)
20	16 July	Tulle to Puy-de-Dôme	220 km (137 mi)	Mountain Stage	Joop Zoetemelk (NED)
21	17 July	Montargis to Versailles	145 km (90 mi)	Flat Stage	Freddy Maertens (BEL)
22a	18 July	Paris	6 km (4 mi)	Individual time trial	Freddy Maertens (BEL)
22b	18 July	Paris to Paris (Champs-Élysées)	91 km (57 mi)	Half Stage	Gerben Karstens (NED)
	Total		4,017 km (2,496 mi)		

== Race overview ==
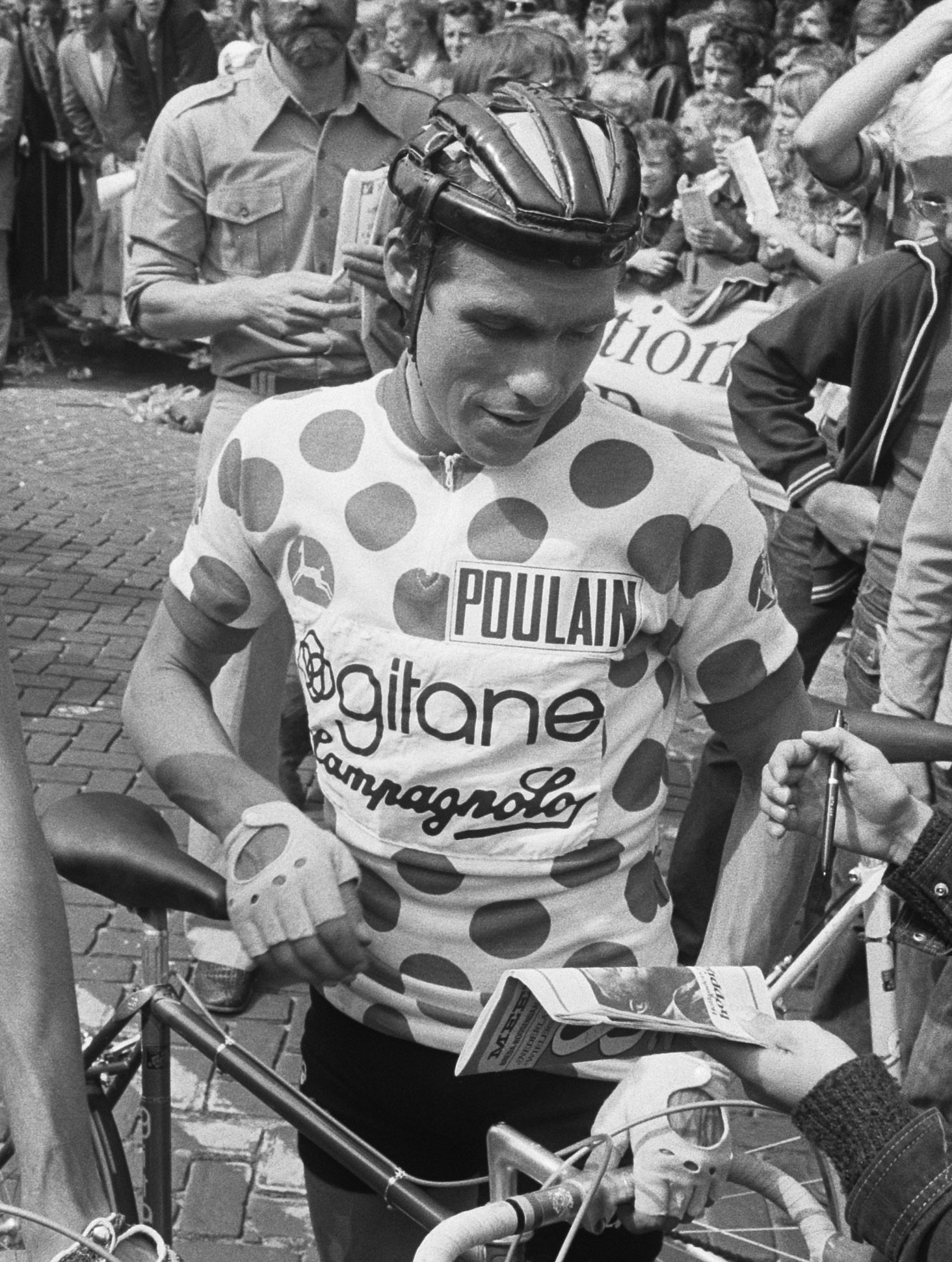
Lucien Van Impe (pictured at the 1975 Acht van Chaam), winner of the general classification

=== The First Week ===
The prologue was won by Freddy Maertens by 0:17 over the 2nd place rider. Between 1967 and 2012 most Tour's had a prologue, which is a short individual time trial less than 10 km, and this victory by Maertens was the largest margin of victory in Tour history. By comparison Merckx's largest prologue victory was only 0:11, yet is still the 3rd largest of all time. The directeur sportif for the Flandria team was Guillaume "Lomme" Driessens, a man who knew what it took to win the Tour de France having directed Merckx; and he was hesitant about allowing his young potential star starting a Tour this early in his career, but he was overridden by the team owner Pol Claeys and Maertens was added to the start list. He followed his prologue victory with another victory in stage 1, and during stage 2 he once again attempted to work his way to the front of the pack to fight for the win where he, along with everybody else, was beaten to the finish line by Giovanni Battaglin who took the victory by a full ten seconds. Stage 3 was another ITT, a 37 km ride around a beach resort along the English Channel known as Le Touquet Paris Plage. Again it was Maertens stealing all of the headlines handily beating the three favorites, as well as the time trial specialists by a considerable margin of over two minutes. In fact, the 2nd place rider at +1:37 behind was neither a favorite nor a specialist but rather his best friend within the peloton, and another young Belgian in Michel Pollentier, who shared the exact same birthday as Maertens, but was one year older. Another up and coming rider who performed well during the time trial was the Dutchman and defending World Champion Hennie Kuiper who finished 2:57 behind Maertens, but still fared better than Thévenet, Van Impe and Zoetemelk.

Stage 4 was won by Kuiper, who beat Eric Loder in a sprint as the two of them finished nine seconds ahead of Piero Gavazzi, Guy Sibille and Gerard Vianen. Stage 5A was a short team time trial won by the TI–Raleigh squad, which was beginning to evolve into one of the strongest time-trialling teams the Tour would ever know as there were no major changes to the overall situation. Stage 5B was yet another flat stage where the winner was able to gain about a ten-second advantage over the pursuing riders who had gotten ahead of the peloton. Guy Sibille had found a way to get up front again, but again he came up short, this time to Miguel-Maria Lasa who won the day. During stage 6 from Bastogne to Nancy, Italian rider Aldo Parecchini escaped and won on a solo breakaway where he finished four and a half minutes ahead of the main field. Stage 7 was an intermediate hilly stage through the Vosges including the Grand Ballon that went from Bastogne to Mulhouse and ended with a bunch sprint velodrome finish where Piero Gavazzi and Jacques Esclassan were beaten to the line by Maertens who had taken his fourth stage win of the first week.

=== Return to Alpe d'Huez ===
Stage 8 was another intermediate hilly stage through the Jura Mountains and was a repeat of the podium places from the previous day where yet again it was Gavazzi, Esclassan and Maertens who took the top places, except this time Esclassan got the win. Going into the first rest day the overall situation had Maertens in the maillot jaune by 2:04 over Pollentier, 3:16 over Kuiper, 3:23 over Jean-Pierre Danguillaume and 3:31 over Raymond Poulidor.

The contenders for the overall victory were thought to be Bernard Thévenet, Joop Zoetemelk and Lucien Van Impe, but all of them were about 4:00 off the lead. Indeed, they were waiting for the mountains to start their battle as the 1976 Tour was designed to be especially grueling with eight high mountain stages including three consecutive high mountain stages in the Alps, followed by a rest day and then four consecutive high mountain stages in the Pyrenees making for seven straight mountain stages which devastated the peloton leaving very few riders, and among them only the riders who excelled in climbing, in contention for the win by the time the final time trial came around in stage 17, followed by one last high mountain stage atop Puy-de-Dôme in stage 20. The first of these mountain stages finished at the mountain resort of Alpe d'Huez. None of the riders in the Tour had ever ridden this stage during the Tour as it had not been included since the 1952 Tour de France when the owner of a hotel in town brought a box of money to Tour organizers and asked them to bring the Grande Boucle to his mountain. History repeated itself to get the Tour to return to the Alpine resort but history would not repeat itself by waiting another quarter century to return to it, rather the legend of Alpe d'Huez was born.

By this point in the Tour many in the press were stunned by the commanding performance of Maertens, to the point that there was speculation among them that he could win the Tour. Even five time Tour champion Jacques Anquetil now thought he could do exactly what his countryman Eddy Merckx had done and win the title in his Tour debut. It was because of stages like this that his directeur sportif Lomme Driessens felt nervous about including the young rider in the Tour because a disastrous stage in the high mountains can have a devastating effect on the psyche of a young rider. Maertens felt he was ready for this however, as he and his friend Michel Pollentier had ridden Alpe d'Huez twenty times during the off-season to be sure he had mastered every one of the twenty-one hairpin turns. The directeur sportif for Van Impe was the young retired rider Cyrille Guimard, and Guimard together with his team captain Robert Mintkiewicz had suggested to Van Impe that he attacked right at the base of Alpe d'Huez and this is exactly what he intended to do. In fact, early in the stage Van Impe rode up alongside Maertens, smiled wryly, and told him he was going to attack at the foot of the Alpe. Maertens replied with a straight face saying nothing more than "I'm ready", because he knew that he was.

The boredom within the peloton of the early morning riding through the valley was broken up when Gerben Karstens scooped up a traffic cone off the side of the road and put it on his head like a hat as he continued riding along. Loud cheers of laughter and approval rang out across the peloton, but race officials were not nearly as amused as before long he was spotted and fined 175 francs for "making ridiculous jokes", prompting the Dutchman to remove his new hat and toss it to some fans standing alongside the road. Before long the ridiculous jokes gave way to the serious attacks as a group of about forty riders made it over the first climb in good order, including the three favorites as well as the young riders of Kuiper, Pollentier and Maertens. Despite the advice from his directeur and team captain, Van Impe joined an early attack made by Italian riders Fausto Bertoglio and Marcello Bergamo to both test the waters, and see if he couldn't get away from the rest of the elite riders. Before long the threesome was reeled back by the group led by Zoetemelk and Thevenet. By the time the race reached the foot of Alpe d'Huez French rider Raymond Delisle launched the first attack and from there riders began being dropped left and right, including Kuiper, Maertens and Pollentier. Zoetemelk and Van Impe then relentlessly attack one another over and over again until the two of them were the only two riders remaining. Neither Thevenet nor Poulidor could match the two riders from the Low Countries as they were both dropped within a group of six riders. Spaniard Francisco Galdós was the final rider to stay in contact but in the end Van Impe and Zoetemelk were alone heading for the finish line where Zoetemelk finally pulled away to take the stage win. At the end of the day, Van Impe put on the yellow jersey for the first time in his career, Zoetemelk rose all the way to 2nd place less than ten seconds behind Van Impe and while Maertens did lose considerable time, he still managed to hold on to 3rd place at 0:54 back.

The following day in stage 10 it was another three grueling climbs including a mountaintop finish at Montgenèvre. Yet again the attacks came often and were entirely relentless as the peloton was devastated for the 2nd day in a row. Any and all ideas Maertens had of winning the Tour were dispatched as he just could not stay with the elite climbers for a second day in a row. His teammate Pollentier however, rode strongly and was within the final group of elite riders on the final climb, but he and Bergamo began to crack as Delisle, Poulidor, Kuiper, Galdos, Zoetemelk, Van Impe and Thevenet rode on. In the end it was Van Impe, Zoetemelk and Thevenet riding together as the finish line approached where Zoetemelk was able to pull away from both of them to claim his 2nd stage win in a row. In the overall situation Van Impe and Zoetemelk had separated themselves from the rest of the field, but were only separated from one another by 0:07. In 3rd place was Poulidor at +1:36, in 4th was defending champ Thevenet at +1:48, in 5th was Galdos at +2:04 with Bertoglio just one second behind him as Pollentier, Kuiper, Delisle and José Martíns rounded out the top 10 with each rider more than +4:00. Stage 11 was stunning because of the dominating solo attack made by José-Luis Viejo, who finished 22:50 ahead of 2nd place Gerben Karstens and 23:07 ahead of the main field lead in by 3rd place Freddy Maertens. Viejo was not a threat to the overall leaders so going into the 2nd rest day there were no major changes atop the general classification, but his stage victory was remarkable as it was the biggest winning margin in post-World War II history. José Viejo won the stage, 22 minutes and 50 seconds ahead of the next cyclist.

=== The Pyrenees ===
In stage 12 two days later, there was another solo attack that did have ramifications for the general classification. Raymond Delisle went on the offensive and while Delisle was not considered a threat for overall victory, he was just over four minutes behind the overall lead so Van Impe wondered if he should give chase. Guimard instructed him to stand fast and keep Zoetemelk marked as he felt Zoetemelk was the only rider who posed a threat to his chances at victory. By the end of the day however, Delisle had surprised the entire field by staying away, and building a gap of 4:59 over Antonio Menéndez by the time he crossed the finish line atop the Pyrenees 2000 resort. By the time Zoetemelk crossed the line with the same time as Viejo he was 6:57 behind the stage winner as Van Impe and the other favorites crossed one second later meaning for the 3rd stage in a row Zoetemelk had taken one second from Van Impe, but now both of them trailed the new race leader Raymond Delisle by nearly 3:00. In stage 13 the contenders all stayed together and a group of seven riders who survived all of the climbs fought it out for the stage win. Régis Ovion initially won the stage, ahead of Willy Teirlinck and Wladimiro Panizza but Ovion failed a drug test so Tierlinck and Panizza were promoted to 1st and 2nd place while 3rd place was left vacated with Ovion left off the back of the standings to fight again another day.

Stage 14 included the Col de Mente, the Portillon, Peyresourde, a summit finish at St.-Lary-Soulon and changed the race dramatically as by the end of the day almost no one was within ten minutes of the Yellow Jersey. It started off no different from any other day in the mountains with the breakaway hopefuls and KOM hunters attacking the early climbs hoping to stay away or going for points but before long there was a group of five formidable riders in an escape that caught the attention of Guimard, possibly because it included Luis Ocaña. Ocaña was about ten minutes behind Van Impe, a considerable distance, but Ocaña was a very strong rider and due to his performance earlier in the season was seen as once again being a contender for the Tour. This in conjunction with the facts that at the time it was still burned in everyone's mind what Ocana had done to essentially win the 1971 Tour, and the last time Ocaña had ridden a stage that included the Col de Menté, during the 1973 Tour de France, he dropped every rider in the field and won the stage by several minutes over everyone other than Zoetemelk. Whatever Guimard's reasons, he wanted Van Impe to join in this attack which also included other very strong climbers in the Giro contender Walter Riccomi and Spanish climbing specialist Pedro Torres, but this obviously was not part of the pre-planned strategy and on the surface seemed unnecessarily risky, as Van Impe was reluctant to do so when Guimard gave him the order. Guimard followed his gut and became animated, threatening to hit him with the team car if he didn't attack and after the discussion was over Van Impe was on his way to bridging the gap as Zoetemelk, Delisle, Poulidor and the defending champ watched without reacting, either feeling unable to survive a long range attack, or in the case of Zoetemelk not feeling the breakaway would survive.

When Van Impe joined the breakaway they continued working together and their gap over the fast depleting peloton gradually increased. Ocana had no problem working together with Van Impe as Ocana and Zoetemelk were vicious rivals for a number of reasons and the two of them had also been involved in crashes in which both riders were seriously injured and nearly killed, leaving the race in a helicopter or an ambulance during a 1971 Tour crash, and a 1974 Midi-Libre crash. Being the 1970s riders and team leaders on the road did not have access to the modern real-time information regarding time gaps and by the time Zoetemelk learned that the breakaway Van Impe was about to join was working, continuing to gain time, and looked as though it might get away if he didn't react immediately, it was too late. The Peugeot team of Delisle did not defend the yellow jersey as Zoetemelk had anticipated and this also contributed to his hesitation. Once he realized Delisle was not going to pursue Van Impe he knew his pursuit would be a solo attack as nobody else, including Delisle, Poulidor, nor Thevenet, could go with him. Zoetemelk rode on his own in pursuit, furiously giving chase, kilometre after kilometre and was able to come within about a minute of catching Van Impe, but as Van Impe arrived within the breakaway group made up of incredibly strong climbers, they all began working together taking turns doing the heavy work at the front causing the gap back to Zoetemelk to increase. Zoetemelk was one of the best riders of his generation but there was simply no way he could chase down so many world class riders all working together. By the time he reached the final climb it was a certainty he would not be able to catch Van Impe, who later in the stage had attacked the breakaway he was in and was riding on solo towards both the stage victory, and since Delisle had cracked, the Yellow Jersey. Zoetemelk was going faster than any other rider up the final climb as he managed to catch and drop all of the other breakaway riders including Torres, Ocana and Riccomi, but Van Impe's attack had paid off, and by the time Zoetemelk hit the finish line he was more than three minutes behind the Belgian. Delisle had fallen to 3rd at 9:27, Riccomi had jumped to 4th at 10:22 as the rest of the new top 10 including Poulidor, Galdos, Bertoglio, Freddy Maertens, José Pesarrodona and Luis Ocaña were beyond eleven minutes.

Stage 15 was the final day in the Pyrenees and included three climbs often included in the Tour in the Col d'Aspin, the Col du Tourmalet and the Col d'Aubisque. Zoetemelk was the only rider with a realistic chance of overtaking Van Impe but the two of them would finish together 5:44 behind the winner Panizza and 2:16 behind the surviving breakaway riders including Enrico Paolini, Arnaldo Caverzasi, Donato Giuliani, Antonio Menéndez, Georges Talbourdet, Carlos Melero, José Martíns and Michel Pollentier who climbed back up to 7th place overall by surviving within this breakaway.

=== The Final Week ===
Stage 16 was a return to the flatlands where Pollentier continued his strong riding by beating 2nd place Maertens, 3rd place Karstens and the rest of the peloton to the line by 0:16. Stage 17 was the final long individual time trial and would decide whether or not Van Impe would put a stranglehold on his 1st-place position, or if Zoetemelk would cut into his lead and set up a final battle on the upcoming Puy-de-Dôme. The stage was won by time trial specialist Ferdi Bracke by 0:08 over Norwegian time trial specialist Knut Knudsen. In the earlier time trial Maertens had beaten Bracke by more than two minutes, and while this time he finished in 3rd place 0:11 back, Maertens had shown he had the ability to survive the high mountains and still perform well in the final week of the Tour. The biggest battle of the day however, was won by Van Impe who finished in 4th place 0:51 behind Bracke, but far more importantly more than a minute ahead of Zoetemelk, meaning he now led the Dutchman by 4:33. This was going to be a tall order for Zoetemelk on Puy-de-Dôme, but the final mountain stage in stage 20 was going to be the last chance for significant changes in the general classification. Stage 18 was actually three different stages, split into sections A, B, and C as the Tour moved from the historical city of Auch in the Pyrenean foothills all the way to the Atlantic coast and the equally historical city of Bordeaux. 18A was won by Freddy Maertens who put on a show in this stage as he outsprinted Gerben Karstens for the win, then in 18B he outsprinted the Frenchman Jacques Esclassan to take the win, but in stage 18C he was finally beaten and finished 2nd in the sprint, to Gerben Karstens. Guy Sibille had been involved in these closely contested stages as well, and was given the Combativity Award for all three stages for his efforts. Stage 19 did not have a bunch sprint finish, but was decided by a successful group of escapees who managed to beat the peloton to the line by just over seven minutes, as Hubert Mathis claimed the stage win by 0:07 over the other eight breakaway riders.

Stage 20 was the final chance for Zoetemelk to attack Van Impe, and attack Van Impe he did. Throughout the Tour the excessive pace set by Zoetemelk and Van Impe as they attacked one another would have caused as many as half the riders to be thrown out of the Tour for finishing outside the cut-off time limit, had the rules not been changed by officials to allow most of them to remain in the race, and this stage would be more of the same. Zoetemelk put the pressure on Van Impe and very much like during the first major mountain stage on Alpe d'Huez it was Zoetemelk and Van Impe leaving everyone else behind as Francisco Galdós was once again the last rider to lose contact with them. For the third time in the Tour Zoetemelk was able to ride away from Van Impe and claim his 3rd high mountain stage win of the Tour, but he was not able to crack Van Impe as he only won the day by 0:12 seconds, essentially meaning that Van Impe had won the Tour. Stage 21 was a return to the flatlands and was decided in a bunch finish in which Maertens continued his dominance by claiming his 7th stage win. Stage 22 was a split stage, and the final day of the race. First up in stage 22A was a brief 6 km time trial around the Champs-Élysées, and then for the 2nd year in a row the Tour ended with a circuit finish around the Champs-Élysées, beginning to build a tradition which has endured up to the present day. The only thing to be decided during the time trial was the 3rd and final podium position as Poulidor and Delisle had been tied for 3rd place since Puy-de-Dôme with both of them 12:15 behind Van Impe, and the Italian rider Riccomi just a few seconds behind the two of them. Delisle finished in 6th place while Poulidor tied for 2nd place with Zoetemelk meaning Poulidor made the podium for the 8th time in his brilliant career, an impressive feat considering he was 40 years old. Winning the stage was Freddy Maertens, tying him with Charles Pélissier and Eddy Merckx, who did so twice, as the only riders in Tour history to win eight stages in a single tour. This was also the 3rd time in this Tour that Maertens had won back to back stages.

This meant that Maertens would be able to break this record if he were able to claim victory on the final stage. He found himself in good position in the front of the pack, but he came up just short having to settle for 2nd place as Gerben Karstens put the finishing touch on what, for him, had been a very successful Tour. Enrique Martínez Heredia won the young rider classification, the intermediate sprints classification went to Van Impe's team captain Robert Mintkiewicz, the overall combativity award went to Raymond Delisle and the victory in the points classification went handily to Freddy Maertens. Van Impe normally competed for the mountains classification and he nearly won it yet again as he and Giancarlo Bellini went back and forth for the lead seven different times but in the end Bellini won the award by a single point 170 to Van Impe's 169. On the podium in 3rd place was Raymond Poulidor, in 2nd place was Joop Zoetemelk as Lucien Van Impe claimed the final yellow jersey as winner of the general classification of the 1976 Tour de France.

=== Aftermath ===
Lucien Van Impe – this was the only Tour de France win of his career, although by the time he retired he had won six King of the Mountains awards, tying with the great Federico Bahamontes for the most of all time until the EPO era of the 1990s and 2000s. He was in contention to win the 1977 edition, leading the race on Alpe d'Huez when he was hit by a car, and had to wait several minutes for a new bike as the riders who were pursuing him continued right on by.

Bernard Thévenet – abandoned this Tour during the 19th stage at no point ever being a legitimate threat to defend his title from the previous year. He went on to win the following year however, in one of the closest two way battles in Tour history, with Hennie Kuiper.

Joop Zoetemelk – 1976 was the 3rd time that Zoetemelk finished in 2nd place. He had the misfortune that the beginning of his career coincided with five time champion Eddy Merckx, and the end of his career coincided with five time champion Bernard Hinault. Zoetemelk wore the maillot jaune for four days in the 3rd week of the 1978 Tour, and six days in the 2nd week of the 1979 edition, only to lose it late in the Tour to Hinault on both occasions. He won the 1980 Tour de France by his performance midway through the Tour convincing Hinault he would not survive the mountain stages against him, as an injured Hinault chose to abandon while wearing the Yellow Jersey while just 0:21 ahead of Zoetemelk. Zoetemelk finished 2nd for a sixth time in 1982, once again to Bernard Hinault.

Freddy Maertens – followed his Tour performance by winning the 1976 World Championship, then the 1977 Vuelta a España in dominant fashion, collecting a monumental 13 stage wins. By 1979 and 1980 however, Maertens had fallen from grace and was basically irrelevant within the cycling world. In fact, in May 1979 Maertens traveled to the United States to find a doctor from outside mainland Europe who could attest that Maertens did not have a drug problem as the media reported he did. The plane Maertens was on landed in New York, but crashed later that day while leaving Chicago killing all 273 people on board resulting in the deadliest crash in American history. Maertens career seemed to be a tragic and sad tale, but in 1981 he staged one of the greatest comebacks in cycling history by winning his 3rd Green Jersey, winning another five stages, and capped it all off with a stunning victory in the World Championship.

=== Doping ===
During the Tour de France, 110 doping tests were taken. Three cyclists tested positive. After the third stage, Jesús Manzaneque tested positive for doping. Manzaneque received a 10-minute penalty in the general classification and was suspended for one month. After the 13th stage, winner Régis Ovion failed the doping test. He was taken out of the results, and Teirlinck and Panizza, who originally were second and third, gained one place. In the official classification, the other cyclists were not upgraded, so the third place remains unoccupied. Bernard Labourdette was caught during the doping test, when he tried to cheat.

== Classification leadership and minor prizes ==
There were several classifications in the 1976 Tour de France, four of them awarding jerseys to their leaders. The most important was the general classification, calculated by adding each cyclist's finishing times on each stage. The cyclist with the least accumulated time was the race leader, identified by the yellow jersey; the winner of this classification is considered the winner of the Tour.

Additionally, there was a points classification, where cyclists got points for finishing among the best in a stage finish, or in intermediate sprints. The cyclist with the most points lead the classification, and was identified with a green jersey. The calculation was changed, to make the competition more accessible for the non-sprinters. There were five types of stages, with respect to how many points could be earned:

- Normal stages: stages 1, 2, 4, 6, 7, 8, 16, 19, 21
- Mountain stages: stages 9, 10, 11, 12, 13, 14, 15, 20
- Long time trials: stages 3 and 17
- Team time trials: stage 5a
- Short time trials: prologue and stage 22a
- Half stages: stages 5b, 18a, 18b, 18c and 22b

There was also a mountains classification. The organisation had categorised some climbs as either first, second, third, or fourth-category; points for this classification were won by the first cyclists that reached the top of these climbs first, with more points available for the higher-categorised climbs. The cyclist with the most points lead the classification, and wore a white jersey with red polka dots.

Another classification was the young rider classification. This was decided the same way as the general classification, but only neo-professionals were eligible, and the leader wore a jersey.

The fifth individual classification was the intermediate sprints classification. This classification had similar rules as the points classification, but only points were awarded on intermediate sprints. In 1976, this classification had no associated jersey.

For the team classification, the times of the best three cyclists per team on each stage were added; the leading team was the team with the lowest total time. The riders in the team that led this classification were identified by yellow caps. There was also a team points classification. Cyclists received points according to their finishing position on each stage, with the first rider receiving one point. The first three finishers of each team had their points combined, and the team with the fewest points led the classification. The riders of the team leading this classification wore green caps.

In addition, there was a combativity award, in which a jury composed of journalists gave points after certain stages to the cyclist they considered most combative. The split stages each had a combined winner. At the conclusion of the Tour, Raymond Delisle won the overall super-combativity award, also decided by journalists. The Souvenir Henri Desgrange was given in honour of Tour founder Henri Desgrange to the first rider to pass the summit of the Col du Lautaret on stage 10. This prize was won by Luciano Conati.

Classification leadership by stage
Stage	Stage winner	General classification	Points classification	Mountains classification	Young rider classification	Intermediate sprints classification	Team classifications		Combativity award
Stage	Stage winner	General classification	Points classification	Mountains classification	Young rider classification	Intermediate sprints classification	Team classification	Team points classification	Combativity award
P	Freddy Maertens	Freddy Maertens	Freddy Maertens	no award	Bert Pronk	no award	Gan–Mercier–Hutchinson	Gan–Mercier–Hutchinson	no award
1	Freddy Maertens	Freddy Maertens	Freddy Maertens	Hennie Kuiper; Roger Legeay	Bert Pronk	Freddy Maertens	Gan–Mercier–Hutchinson	TI–Raleigh–Campagnolo	Martín Emilio Rodríguez
2	Giovanni Battaglin	Freddy Maertens	Freddy Maertens	Arnaldo Caverzasi	Bert Pronk	Freddy Maertens	Gan–Mercier–Hutchinson	TI–Raleigh–Campagnolo	Jean-Pierre Genet
3	Freddy Maertens	Freddy Maertens	Freddy Maertens	Arnaldo Caverzasi	Bert Pronk	Freddy Maertens	Flandria–Velda–West Vlaams Vleesbedrijf	TI–Raleigh–Campagnolo	no award
4	Hennie Kuiper	Freddy Maertens	Freddy Maertens	Hennie Kuiper; Arnaldo Caverzasi	Bert Pronk	Freddy Maertens	Flandria–Velda–West Vlaams Vleesbedrijf	TI–Raleigh–Campagnolo	Joël Hauvieux
5a	TI–Raleigh–Campagnolo	Freddy Maertens	Freddy Maertens	Hennie Kuiper; Arnaldo Caverzasi	Bert Pronk	Freddy Maertens	Flandria–Velda–West Vlaams Vleesbedrijf	TI–Raleigh–Campagnolo	Pedro Torres
5b	Miguel María Lasa	Freddy Maertens	Freddy Maertens	Hennie Kuiper; Arnaldo Caverzasi	Bert Pronk	Robert Mintkiewicz	Flandria–Velda–West Vlaams Vleesbedrijf	TI–Raleigh–Campagnolo	Pedro Torres
6	Aldo Parecchini	Freddy Maertens	Freddy Maertens	Hennie Kuiper; Arnaldo Caverzasi	Bert Pronk	Robert Mintkiewicz	Brooklyn	Gan–Mercier–Hutchinson	Luis Ocaña
7	Freddy Maertens	Freddy Maertens	Freddy Maertens	Hennie Kuiper	Bert Pronk	Freddy Maertens	Gan–Mercier–Hutchinson	Gan–Mercier–Hutchinson	Luis Ocaña
8	Jacques Esclassan	Freddy Maertens	Freddy Maertens	Giancarlo Bellini	Bert Pronk	Robert Mintkiewicz	Gan–Mercier–Hutchinson	Gan–Mercier–Hutchinson	Bernard Labourdette
9	Joop Zoetemelk	Lucien Van Impe	Freddy Maertens	Giancarlo Bellini	Patrick Perret	Robert Mintkiewicz	Gan–Mercier–Hutchinson	Gan–Mercier–Hutchinson	Giancarlo Bellini
10	Joop Zoetemelk	Lucien Van Impe	Freddy Maertens	Lucien Van Impe	Alain Meslet	Robert Mintkiewicz	Gan–Mercier–Hutchinson	Gan–Mercier–Hutchinson	Gianbattista Baronchelli
11	José Viejo	Lucien Van Impe	Freddy Maertens	Lucien Van Impe	Alain Meslet	Robert Mintkiewicz	Gan–Mercier–Hutchinson	Gan–Mercier–Hutchinson	José Casas García
12	Raymond Delisle	Raymond Delisle	Freddy Maertens	Lucien Van Impe	Alain Meslet	Freddy Maertens	Peugeot–Esso–Michelin	Gan–Mercier–Hutchinson	Roger Legeay
13	Willy Teirlinck	Raymond Delisle	Freddy Maertens	Giancarlo Bellini	Alain Meslet	Freddy Maertens; Robert Mintkiewicz	Peugeot–Esso–Michelin	Gan–Mercier–Hutchinson	Roland Berland
14	Lucien Van Impe	Lucien Van Impe	Freddy Maertens	Lucien Van Impe	Alain Meslet	Freddy Maertens; Robert Mintkiewicz	Kas–Campagnolo	Gan–Mercier–Hutchinson	Lucien Van Impe
15	Wladimiro Panizza	Lucien Van Impe	Freddy Maertens	Lucien Van Impe	Alain Meslet	Freddy Maertens; Robert Mintkiewicz	Kas–Campagnolo	Gan–Mercier–Hutchinson	Wladimiro Panizza
16	Michel Pollentier	Lucien Van Impe	Freddy Maertens	Lucien Van Impe	Alain Meslet	Robert Mintkiewicz	Kas–Campagnolo	Gan–Mercier–Hutchinson	Roger Legeay
17	Ferdinand Bracke	Lucien Van Impe	Freddy Maertens	Lucien Van Impe	Bert Pronk	Robert Mintkiewicz	Kas–Campagnolo	Gan–Mercier–Hutchinson	Joop Zoetemelk
18a	Freddy Maertens	Lucien Van Impe	Freddy Maertens	Lucien Van Impe	Bert Pronk	Robert Mintkiewicz	Kas–Campagnolo	Gan–Mercier–Hutchinson	Guy Sibille
18b	Freddy Maertens	Lucien Van Impe	Freddy Maertens	Lucien Van Impe	Bert Pronk	Robert Mintkiewicz	Kas–Campagnolo	Gan–Mercier–Hutchinson	Guy Sibille
18c	Gerben Karstens	Lucien Van Impe	Freddy Maertens	Giancarlo Bellini	Bert Pronk	Robert Mintkiewicz	Kas–Campagnolo	Gan–Mercier–Hutchinson	Guy Sibille
19	Hubert Mathis	Lucien Van Impe	Freddy Maertens	Giancarlo Bellini	Bert Pronk	Robert Mintkiewicz	Kas–Campagnolo	Gan–Mercier–Hutchinson	Hubert Mathis
20	Joop Zoetemelk	Lucien Van Impe	Freddy Maertens	Lucien Van Impe	Enrique Martínez Heredia	Robert Mintkiewicz	Kas–Campagnolo	Gan–Mercier–Hutchinson	Patrick Béon
21	Freddy Maertens	Lucien Van Impe	Freddy Maertens	Giancarlo Bellini	Enrique Martínez Heredia	Robert Mintkiewicz	Kas–Campagnolo	Gan–Mercier–Hutchinson	Freddy Maertens
22a	Freddy Maertens	Lucien Van Impe	Freddy Maertens	Giancarlo Bellini	Enrique Martínez Heredia	Robert Mintkiewicz	Kas–Campagnolo	Gan–Mercier–Hutchinson	no award
22b	Gerben Karstens	Lucien Van Impe	Freddy Maertens	Giancarlo Bellini	Enrique Martínez Heredia	Robert Mintkiewicz	Kas–Campagnolo	Gan–Mercier–Hutchinson	no award
Final		Lucien Van Impe	Freddy Maertens	Giancarlo Bellini	Enrique Martínez Heredia	Robert Mintkiewicz	Kas–Campagnolo	Gan–Mercier–Hutchinson	Raymond Delisle

== Final standings ==
Legend
A yellow jersey.	Denotes the winner of the general classification	A green jersey.	Denotes the winner of the points classification
A white jersey with red polka dots.	Denotes the winner of the mountains classification	A white jersey.	Denotes the winner of the young rider classification

=== General classification ===
Final general classification (1–10)
Rank	Rider	Team	Time
1	Lucien Van Impe (BEL)	Gitane–Campagnolo	116h 22' 23"
2	Joop Zoetemelk (NED)	Gan–Mercier–Hutchinson	+ 4' 14"
3	Raymond Poulidor (FRA)	Gan–Mercier–Hutchinson	+ 12' 08"
4	Raymond Delisle (FRA)	Peugeot–Esso–Michelin	+ 12' 17"
5	Walter Riccomi (ITA)	Scic–Fiat	+ 12' 39"
6	Francisco Galdós (ESP)	Kas–Campagnolo	+ 14' 50"
7	Michel Pollentier (BEL)	Flandria–Velda–West Vlaams Vleesbedrijf	+ 14' 59"
8	Freddy Maertens (BEL)	Flandria–Velda–West Vlaams Vleesbedrijf	+ 16' 09"
9	Fausto Bertoglio (ITA)	Jollj Ceramica–Decor	+ 16' 36"
10	Vicente López Carril (ESP)	Kas–Campagnolo	+ 19' 28"

Final general classification (11–87)
Rank	Rider	Team	Time
11	José Pesarrodona (ESP)	Kas–Campagnolo	+ 21' 14"
12	José Martíns (POR)	Kas–Campagnolo	+ 21' 45"
13	Wladimiro Panizza (ITA)	Scic–Fiat	+ 22' 08"
14	Luis Ocaña (ESP)	Super Ser	+ 25' 08"
15	Raymond Martin (FRA)	Gitane–Campagnolo	+ 25' 35"
16	Giancarlo Bellini (ITA)	Brooklyn	+ 26' 43"
17	Pedro Torres (ESP)	Super Ser	+ 32' 44"
18	Ronald De Witte (BEL)	Brooklyn	+ 34' 21"
19	Ferdinand Julien (FRA)	Lejeune–BP	+ 36' 29"
20	Robert Bouloux (FRA)	Jobo–Spidel–Wolber–La France	+ 39' 54"
21	Georges Talbourdet (FRA)	Gan–Mercier–Hutchinson	+ 41' 35"
22	Jean-Pierre Danguillaume (FRA)	Peugeot–Esso–Michelin	+ 41' 42"
23	Enrique Martinez (ESP)	Kas–Campagnolo	+ 44' 50"
24	Alain Meslet (FRA)	Gitane–Campagnolo	+ 46' 20"
25	Antonio Martos (ESP)	Kas–Campagnolo	+ 47' 42"
26	Bert Pronk (NED)	TI–Raleigh–Campagnolo	+ 48' 39"
27	Antonio Menéndez (ESP)	Kas–Campagnolo	+ 49' 13"
28	Régis Ovion (FRA)	Peugeot–Esso–Michelin	+ 52' 36"
29	Christian Seznec (FRA)	Gan–Mercier–Hutchinson	+ 53' 52"
30	Bernard Bourreau (FRA)	Peugeot–Esso–Michelin	+ 54' 53"
31	José Viejo (ESP)	Super Ser	+ 55' 16"
32	Donato Giuliani (ITA)	Jollj Ceramica–Decor	+ 58' 40"
33	Hubert Mathis (FRA)	Miko–de Gribaldy–Superia	+ 1h 00' 03"
34	Miguel María Lasa (ESP)	Scic–Fiat	+ 1h 00' 49"
35	Roger Legeay (FRA)	Lejeune–BP	+ 1h 01' 59"
36	Attilio Rota (ITA)	Scic–Fiat	+ 1h 03' 11"
37	Luciano Conati (ITA)	Scic–Fiat	+ 1h 04' 48"
38	Marcello Bergamo (ITA)	Jollj Ceramica–Decor	+ 1h 04' 50"
39	André Romero (FRA)	Jobo–Spidel–Wolber–La France	+ 1h 07' 37"
40	Michel Perin (FRA)	Gan–Mercier–Hutchinson	+ 1h 08' 30"
41	Bernard Labourdette (FRA)	Jobo–Spidel–Wolber–La France	+ 1h 12' 06"
42	Mariano Martínez (FRA)	Lejeune–BP	+ 1h 25' 34"
43	Jean-Pierre Genet (FRA)	Gan–Mercier–Hutchinson	+ 1h 26' 39"
44	Arnaldo Caverzasi (ITA)	Scic–Fiat	+ 1h 27' 33"
45	Yves Hézard (FRA)	Gan–Mercier–Hutchinson	+ 1h 29' 34"
46	Michel Le Denmat (FRA)	Lejeune–BP	+ 1h 29' 45"
47	Guy Sibille (FRA)	Peugeot–Esso–Michelin	+ 1h 31' 27"
48	Maurice Le Guilloux (FRA)	Gan–Mercier–Hutchinson	+ 1h 33' 23"
49	Robert Mintkiewicz (FRA)	Gitane–Campagnolo	+ 1h 34' 11"
50	Enrico Paolini (ITA)	Scic–Fiat	+ 1h 37' 14"
51	Ivan Schmid (SUI)	Flandria–Velda–West Vlaams Vleesbedrijf	+ 1h 40' 52"
52	Carlos Melero (ESP)	Kas–Campagnolo	+ 1h 46' 19"
53	Hubert Arbès (FRA)	Gitane–Campagnolo	+ 1h 46' 58"
54	Herman Van der Slagmolen (BEL)	Brooklyn	+ 1h 52' 48"
55	Celestino Vercelli (ITA)	Scic–Fiat	+ 1h 56' 16"
56	Marc Demeyer (BEL)	Flandria–Velda–West Vlaams Vleesbedrijf	+ 1h 58' 53"
57	Albert Van Vlierberghe (BEL)	Flandria–Velda–West Vlaams Vleesbedrijf	+ 1h 59' 18"
58	Charles Rouxel (FRA)	Peugeot–Esso–Michelin	+ 1h 59' 26"
59	Alessio Antonini (ITA)	Jollj Ceramica–Decor	+ 1h 59' 42"
60	Sylvain Vasseur (FRA)	Gitane–Campagnolo	+ 2h 01' 47"
61	Patrick Béon (FRA)	Peugeot–Esso–Michelin	+ 2h 03' 56"
62	Herman Beysens (BEL)	Flandria–Velda–West Vlaams Vleesbedrijf	+ 2h 05' 04"
63	Pierino Gavazzi (ITA)	Jollj Ceramica–Decor	+ 2h 05' 05"
64	Knut Knudsen (NOR)	Jollj Ceramica–Decor	+ 2h 05' 33"
65	André Chalmel (FRA)	Gitane–Campagnolo	+ 2h 08' 49"
66	Marcello Osler (ITA)	Brooklyn	+ 2h 09' 53"
67	Willy Teirlinck (BEL)	Gitane–Campagnolo	+ 2h 12' 37"
68	Santiago Lazcano (ESP)	Super Ser	+ 2h 13' 24"
69	Paul Wellens (BEL)	Miko–de Gribaldy–Superia	+ 2h 14' 11"
70	Joel Hauvieux (FRA)	Lejeune–BP	+ 2h 14' 25"
71	Domingo Perurena (ESP)	Kas–Campagnolo	+ 2h 14' 43"
72	Roland Berland (FRA)	Super Ser	+ 2h 14' 50"
73	Régis Delépine (FRA)	Gan–Mercier–Hutchinson	+ 2h 15' 22"
74	René Dillen (BEL)	Gitane–Campagnolo	+ 2h 16' 13"
75	Guy Maingon (FRA)	Jobo–Spidel–Wolber–La France	+ 2h 17' 28"
76	Gerard Vianen (NED)	Gan–Mercier–Hutchinson	+ 2h 20' 22"
77	Ferdinand Bracke (BEL)	Lejeune–BP	+ 2h 21' 24"
78	Adriano Passuello (ITA)	Brooklyn	+ 2h 28' 46"
79	José De Cauwer (BEL)	TI–Raleigh–Campagnolo	+ 2h 29' 52"
80	Jacques Esclassan (FRA)	Peugeot–Esso–Michelin	+ 2h 30' 13"
81	Roland Smet (FRA)	Lejeune–BP	+ 2h 31' 09"
82	Roger Loysch (BEL)	Miko–de Gribaldy–Superia	+ 2h 32' 25"
83	Jan Raas (NED)	TI–Raleigh–Campagnolo	+ 2h 39' 41"
84	Gerben Karstens (NED)	TI–Raleigh–Campagnolo	+ 2h 44' 27"
85	Eric Lalouette (FRA)	Lejeune–BP	+ 2h 50' 03"
86	José Luis Uribezubia (ESP)	Super Ser	+ 3h 10' 05"
87	Aad van den Hoek (NED)	TI–Raleigh–Campagnolo	+ 3h 12' 54"

=== Points classification ===
Final points classification (1–10)
Rank	Rider	Team	Points
1	Freddy Maertens (BEL)	Flandria–Velda–West Vlaams Vleesbedrijf	293
2	Pierino Gavazzi (ITA)	Jollj Ceramica–Decor	140
3	Jacques Esclassan (FRA)	Peugeot–Esso–Michelin	128
4	Enrico Paolini (ITA)	Scic–Fiat	122
5	Gerben Karstens (NED)	TI–Raleigh–Campagnolo	108
6	Michel Pollentier (BEL)	Flandria–Velda–West Vlaams Vleesbedrijf	90
7	Régis Delépine (FRA)	Gan–Mercier–Hutchinson	79
8	Joop Zoetemelk (NED)	Gan–Mercier–Hutchinson	78
9	Wladimiro Panizza (ITA)	Scic–Fiat	73
10	Raymond Poulidor (FRA)	Gan–Mercier–Hutchinson	72

=== Mountains classification ===
Final mountains classification (1–10)
Rank	Rider	Team	Points
1	Giancarlo Bellini (ITA)	Brooklyn	170
2	Lucien Van Impe (BEL)	Gitane–Campagnolo	169
3	Joop Zoetemelk (NED)	Gan–Mercier–Hutchinson	119
4	Francisco Galdós (ESP)	Kas–Compagnolo	85
5	Raymond Poulidor (FRA)	Gan–Mercier–Hutchinson	81
6	Pedro Torres (ESP)	Super Ser	65
7	Raymond Delisle (FRA)	Peugeot–Esso–Michelin	63
8	Antonio Menéndez (ESP)	Kas–Compagnolo	59
9	Luciano Conati (ITA)	Scic–Fiat	56
10	Walter Riccomi (ITA)	Scic–Fiat	49

=== Young rider classification ===
Final young rider classification (1–10)
Rank	Rider	Team	Time
1	Enrique Martínez Heredia (ESP)	Kas–Campagnolo	117h 07' 13"
2	Alain Meslet (FRA)	Gitane–Campagnolo	+ 1′ 30″
3	Bert Pronk (NED)	TI–Raleigh–Campagnolo	+ 3′ 49″
4	Christian Seznec (FRA)	Gan–Mercier–Hutchinson	+ 9' 02"
5	Hubert Mathis (FRA)	Miko–de Gribaldy–Superia	+ 15' 13"
6	Michel Le Denmat (FRA)	Lejeune–BP	+ 44' 55"
7	Ivan Schmid (SUI)	Flandria–Velda–West Vlaams Vleesbedrijf	+ 56' 02"
8	Hubert Arbès (FRA)	Gitane–Campagnolo	+ 1h 02' 18"
9	André Chalmel (FRA)	Gitane–Campagnolo	+ 1h 23' 59"
10	Paul Wellens (BEL)	Miko–de Gribaldy–Superia	+ 1h 29' 21"

=== Intermediate sprints classification ===
Final intermediate sprints classification (1–10)
Rank	Rider	Team	Points
1	Robert Mintkiewicz (FRA)	Gitane–Campagnolo	54
2	Freddy Maertens (BEL)	Flandria–Velda–West Vlaams Vleesbedrijf	37
3	Marcello Osler (ITA)	Brooklyn	24
4	Pedro Torres (ESP)	Super Ser	14
5	Willy Teirlinck (BEL)	Gitane–Campagnolo	13
6	Pierino Gavazzi (ITA)	Jollj Ceramica–Decor	12
7	Régis Delépine (FRA)	Gan–Mercier–Hutchinson	11
8	Éric Lalouette (FRA)	Lejeune–BP	10
9	Michel Pollentier (BEL)	Flandria–Velda–West Vlaams Vleesbedrijf	9
10	Jacques Esclassan (FRA)	Peugeot–Esso–Michelin	9

=== Team classification ===
Final team classification (1–10)
Rank	Team	Time
1	Kas–Compagnolo	350h 05' 39"
2	Gan–Mercier–Hutchinson	+ 9' 20"
3	Scic–Fiat	+ 28' 02"
4	Peugeot–Esso–Michelin	+ 30' 49"
5	Gitane–Campagnolo	+ 40' 03"
6	Super Ser	+ 43' 05"
7	Jollj Ceramica–Decor	+ 1h 01' 55"
8	Flandria–Velda–West Vlaams Vleesbedrijf	+ 1h 18' 43"
9	Lejeune–BP	+ 1h 37' 53"
10	Jobo–Spidel–Wolber–La France	+ 1h 43' 45"

=== Team points classification ===
Final team points classification (1–10)
Rank	Team	Points
1	Gan–Mercier–Hutchinson	886
2	Scic–Fiat	1331
3	Peugeot–Esso–Michelin	1472
4	Flandria–Velda–West Vlaams Vleesbedrijf	1605
5	Kas–Campagnolo	1721
6	Jollj Ceramica–Decor	1724
7	Gitane–Campagnolo	1728
8	Brooklyn	1816
9	Lejeune–BP	1992
10	TI–Raleigh–Campagnolo	2023

== Bibliography ==
- Augendre, Jacques (2016). Guide historique [Historical guide] (PDF) (in French). Paris: Amaury Sport Organisation. Archived (PDF) from the original on 17 August 2016.
- Cossins, Peter (2015). Alpe d'Huez: The Story of Pro Cycling's Greatest Climb. London: Aurum Press. ISBN 978-1-78131-477-7.
- Lowe, Felix (2014). Climbs and Punishment. London: Bantam Press. ISBN 978-0-593-07334-6.
- McGann, Bill; McGann, Carol (2008). The Story of the Tour de France: 1965–2007. Vol. 2. Indianapolis: Dog Ear Publishing. ISBN 978-1-59858-608-4.
- Nauright, John; Parrish, Charles (2012). Sports Around the World: History, Culture, and Practice. Vol. 2. Santa Barbara, California: ABC-CLIO. ISBN 978-1-59884-300-2.
- Saunders, David (1976). Tour de France 1976. Keighley, UK: Kennedy Brothers Publishing. OCLC 4043734.
- van den Akker, Pieter (2018). Tour de France Rules and Statistics: 1903–2018. Self-published. ISBN 978-1-79398-080-9.
