= Grand Prix de la ville de Nogent-sur-Oise =

French one-day road cycling race

Race details
- Date: April (until 2012); March (2013); May (2014–2016); September (2017)
- Region: Nogent-sur-Oise, France
- Discipline: Road race
- Competition: UCI Europe Tour
- Type: One day race
- Organiser: CC Nogent-sur-Oise

History
- First edition: 1945
- Editions: 79 (as of 2026)
- First winner: Cadet (FRA)
- Most wins: Robert Trafert (FRA); Thierry Grandsir (FRA); Éric Lalouette (FRA); André Fosse (FRA); (2 wins)
- Most recent: Hugo Théot (FRA)

The Grand Prix de la ville de Nogent-sur-Oise is a road bicycle race held annually in France. It was organized as a 1.2 event on the UCI Europe Tour from 2005 to 2013, and again in 2015. The race was reserved for amateurs in 2014 and 2016.

== Winners ==
Year	Winner	Second	Third
1945	(France) Cadet		
1946	(France) Van Lerbergue		
1947	(France) Lacour		
1948	(France) Bordinat		
1949	(France) Pieters		
1950	(France) Decroix		
1951	(France) Leitchmann		
1952	(France) Brachet		
1953	(France) André Hantutte		
1954	(France) Gaillart		
1955	(France) Bernard Viot		
1956	(France) Robert Trafert		
1957	(France) Jean Hoffman		
1958	(France) Robert Trafert		
1959	(France) Daniel Dhieux		
1960	(France) Guy Claud		
1961	(Spain) José Saura		
1962	(France) Jean-Paul Caffi		
1963	(France) Bernard Launois		
1964	(New Zealand) Laurence Byers		
1965	(Netherlands) Henri Hiddinga		
1966	(France) Claude Guyot		
1967	(France) Dominique Dussez		
1968	(France) Giovanni Fusco		
1969	(France) Joël Grandsir		
1970	(France) Jean-Pierre Loth		
1971	(France) Joël Girard		
1972	(France) Thierry Grandsir		
1973	(France) Gérard Auguet		
1974	(France) Thierry Grandsir		
1975	(France) Éric Lalouette		
1976	(France) André Fosse		
1977	(France) Yves Daniel		
1978	(France) Jean-Pierre Danguillaume	(France) Yves Daniel	(Belgium) Willy Teirlinck
1979	(France) Gerard Aviegne		
1980	(France) Jacques Bossis	(France) Philippe Tesniere	(France) Régis Ovion
1981	(France) Bernard Hinault	(France) Hubert Mathis	(France) Bernard Quilfen
1982	(France) Bernard Stoerssel		
1983	(France) Gilles Benichon		
1984	(France) Thierry Lefèvre		
1985	(France) Jean Luc Carer		
1986	(New Zealand) Leigh Chapman		
1987	(France) Yannick Foirest		
1988	(France) Marcel Richeux		
1989	(France) Jean Claude Andrieux		
1990	(France) Eddy Seigneur		
1991	(France) Jean Sébastien Mizzi		
1992	(France) Jean-Christophe Rogert		
1993	(France) Michel Dubreuil		
1994	(France) Jean Jacques Moros		
1995	(France) Jean-Michel Thilloy		
1996	(France) Auguste Arnaud		
1997	(France) Samuel Renaux	(France) Franck Tognin	(France) Vincent Klaes
1998	(France) Mickaël Leveau	(France) Mickael Fouliard	(France) Erwann Jan
1999	(Lithuania) Artūras Trumpauskas	(France) Loïc Vasseur	(France) Mickael Fouliard
2000	(Belgium) Sebastien Six	(France) Cedric Loue	(Japan) Shinichi Fukushima
2001	(Belgium) Philip Vereecke	(Belgium) Christophe Stevens	(France) David Drieux
2002	(France) Pascal Carlot	(France) Tony Cavet	(Moldova) Alexandre Sabalin
2003	(Belgium) Marc Chanoine	(Belgium) Steven De Champs	(Australia) Paul Redenbach
2004	(France) Kilian Patour	(France) Sébastien Minard	(Bulgaria) Vladimir Koev
2005	(France) Tristan Valentin	(France) Médéric Clain	(France) Samuel Gicquel
2006	(Netherlands) Jos Pronk	(Sweden) Fredrik Johansson	(Poland) Piotr Chmielewski
2007	(Poland) Mateusz Mróz	(Denmark) Martin Mortensen	(Russia) Ivan Seledkov
2008	(Lithuania) Evaldas Šiškevičius	(France) Cyril Bessy	(Lithuania) Andrius Buividas
2009	(Denmark) Martin Pedersen	(France) Alexis Bodiot	(Estonia) Erki Pütsep
2010	(Lithuania) Vytautas Kaupas	(Russia) Alexander Mironov	(Russia) Dimitry Samokhvalov
2011	(Russia) Alexey Tsatevitch	(Netherlands) Barry Markus	(Greece) Ioannis Tamouridis
2012	(Russia) Igor Boev	(France) Alexis Bodiot	(Belgium) Steve Schets
2013	(Denmark) Alexander Kamp	(France) Alexis Bodiot	(Belgium) Jérôme Baugnies
2014	(France) Clément Penven	(France) Quentin Pacher	(France) François Lamiraud
2015	(Belgium) Robin Stenuit	(Italy) Andrea Pasqualon	(Belgium) Kevyn Ista
2016	(France) Guillaume Gaboriaud	(France) Étienne Fabre	(France) Clément Russo
2017	(France) Jordan Levasseur	(Belgium) Dimitri Peyskens	(France) Benoît Jarrier
2018	(France) Julien Antomarchi	(France) Mickaël Guichard	(France) Florent Pereira
2019	(Belgium) Emiel Vermeulen	(France) Maxime Urruty	(France) Samuel Leroux
2020	No race		
2021	(Estonia) Karl Patrick Lauk	(South Africa) Morne Van Niekerk	(France) Mickaël Guichard
2022	(United Kingdom) Alexander Richardson	(France) Baptiste Veistroffer	(France) Maxime Dransart
2023	No race		
2024	(France) Justin Ducret	(Algeria) Yacine Hamza	(France) Ronan Augé
2025	No race		
2026	(France) Hugo Théot	(United Kingdom) Oliver Dawson	(United Kingdom) George Kimber
