= Éric Lalouette =

French cyclist

Personal information
- Born: 5 December 1951 (age 74) Abbeville, France

Cycling career
- Sport: Cycling
- Role: Rider

Éric Lalouette (born 5 December 1951) is a French former professional racing cyclist. His sporting career began with La Hutte-Gitane. He rode in the 1976 Tour de France.
