= Donato Giuliani =

Italian cyclist (1946–2025)

Personal information
- Born: 4 October 1946 Spoltore, Italy
- Died: 26 April 2025 (aged 78) Pineto, Italy

Cycling career
- Sport: Cycling
- Discipline: Road
- Role: Rider

Professional teams
- 1970–1974: Filotex
- 1975–1977: Jollj Ceramica

Donato Giuliani (4 October 1946 – 26 April 2025) was an Italian professional racing cyclist.

Giuliani rode in the 1975 and 1976 Tour de France, and in seven editions of the Giro d'Italia, notably ranking 14th in 1971. During his career, he won two Coppa San Sabino, a Coppa Cicogna, two stages at the Tour de Suisse, and one stage at the Tour de Romandie.

After his retirement, Giuliani served as sports director of several Italian and Swiss teams.

Donato Giuliani died on 26 April 2025, at the age of 78.
