= Roger Legeay =

French cyclist and manager

Personal information
- Full name: Roger Legeay
- Born: August 8, 1949 (age 77) Beaufay, France

Cycling career
- Sport: Cycling
- Discipline: Road
- Role: Rider & Manager

Professional teams
- 1973: Flandria–Carpenter
- 1974: Maniglace–Juaneda
- 1975: Jobo–Wolber
- 1976–1978: Lejeune–BP
- 1979–1981: Peugeot–Esso–Michelin
- 1982: Peugeot–Shell–Michelin

Roger Legeay (born 8 August 1949) is a French former professional racing cyclist and cycling team manager.

== Biography ==
Legeay was the manager of the Peugeot cycling team in its final year of existence in 1986. In 1987, he created the Vétements Z–Peugeot team as a continuation of the Peugeot cycling team, which he managed until 2008. During its existence, due to changes in sponsorship, the team was renamed Z–Peugeot (1988–89), Z–Tomasso (1990), Z (1991–92), GAN (1993–96) and Crédit Agricole (1997–2008). Legeay's team is best remembered for being the team which the American cyclist Greg LeMond rode for when he won the Tour de France in 1990.

He managed also Pascal Simon, Stephen Roche, Ronan Pensec, Cédric Vasseur, Gilbert Duclos-Lassalle, Frédéric Moncassin, Stéphane Heulot, Chris Boardman, Thor Hushovd, Stuart O'Grady.

The team disbanded at the end of the 2008 season when Crédit Agricole ended their sponsorship. He was vice-president of the French Cycling Federation too.

Legeay finished 84th in the 1980 Tour de France and during the 1976 Tour de France he finished 35th and was given the Combativity Award on two stages.

== Doping ==
In 2007 Legeay was involved in the founding of the Mouvement pour un cyclisme crédible, an organisation of teams and others involved in cycle racing promoting more rigorous standards regarding combating doping in the peloton. He became the movement's president and continued in this role after the disbanding of the Crédit Agricole team.

== Major results ==
1976
2nd Brette-les-Pins
3rd General Classification Quatre jours de Dunkerque
2nd Vailly-sur-Sauldre
3rd Vendôme

1977
2nd GP Ouest France
2nd Neufchâtel-en-Bray
3rd Stage 5, Tour de Suisse, Fiesch
3rd Le Quillo

1978
2nd Camors
2nd Chauffailles
1st Fougères
2nd GP de Mauléon Moulins
3rd GP des Herbiers
2nd Lannion
2nd Neufchâtel-en-Bray
1st Stage 4, Tour de Romandie, Montreux
1st Stage 2, Circuit de la Sarthe

1979
3rd Camors
3rd Châteauroux – Classic de l'Indre
2nd Plessala, Plessala
1st Agon-Coutainville

1980
1st Cholet-Pays de Loire
2nd Circuit des genêts verts
1st GP de Mauléon Moulins
3rd Ploërdut
2nd Tour de Vendée
2nd stage 1, Circuit de la Sarthe
1st Stage 3, Circuit de la Sarthe
2nd Maël-Pestivien
1st Josselin
2nd Changé

1981
1st Cholet-Pays de Loire
1st GP de Mauléon Moulins
1st Lisieux, Criterium, Lisieux
2nd Chateau-Chinon
2nd Pointe-à-Pitre

1982
1st Rouen
2nd Joeuf

== See also ==
- List of doping cases in cycling
