= Luciano Conati =

Italian cyclist

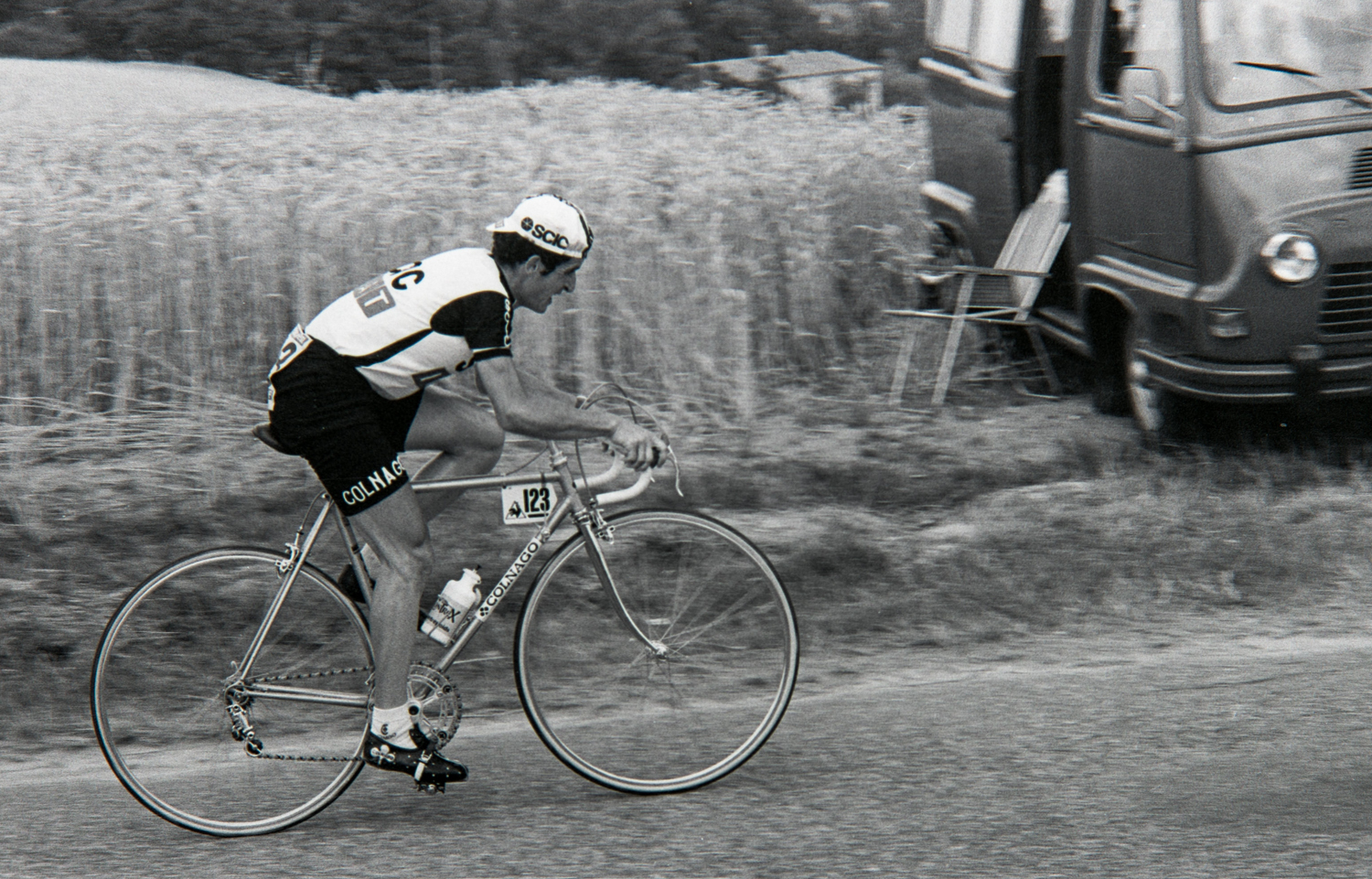
- Conati in the 1976 Tour de France

Personal information
- Born: 17 March 1950 Marano di Valpolicella, Italy
- Died: 6 February 2016 (aged 65)

Cycling career
- Sport: Cycling
- Role: Rider

Luciano Conati (17 March 1950 – 6 February 2016) was an Italian professional racing cyclist. He rode in the 1976 Tour de France.
