= Guy Sibille =

French cyclist

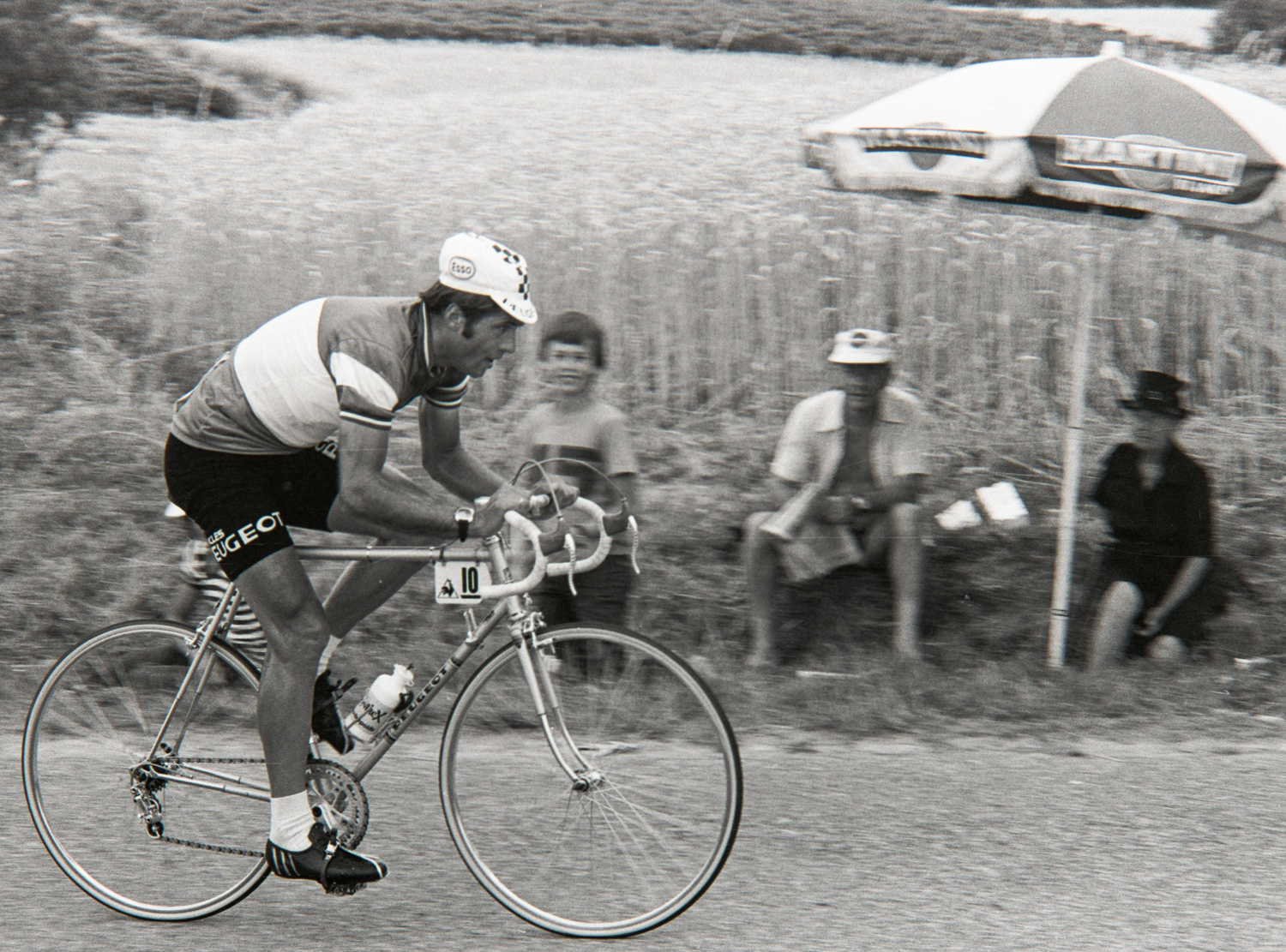
- Sibille at the 1976 Tour de France

Personal information
- Full name: Guy Sibille
- Born: 25 August 1948 (age 78) Marseille, France

Cycling career
- Sport: Cycling
- Role: Rider

Guy Sibille (born 25 August 1948) is a former French racing cyclist. He won the French national road race title in 1976. He also competed in the team time trial at the 1972 Summer Olympics.
