= Walter Riccomi =

Italian cyclist

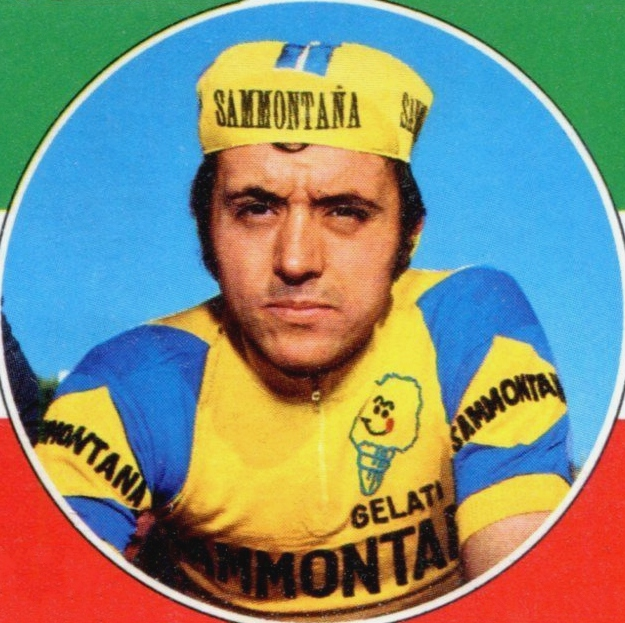
- Riccomi in 1973

Personal information
- Full name: Walter Riccomi
- Born: 18 January 1950 (age 76) Montecarlo, Italy

Cycling career
- Sport: Cycling
- Discipline: Road
- Role: Rider

Walter Riccomi (born 18 January 1950) is a retired Italian professional road bicycle racer. Riccomi finished in the top ten of a grand tour four times, but did not win any stage. He also competed in the individual road race at the 1972 Summer Olympics.

== Palmarès ==
1975
Giro d'Italia:

7th place overall classification

1976
Castiglione del Lago
Gran Premio Città di Camaiore
Gran Premio Industria e Commercio di Prato
Giro d'Italia:

9th place overall classification

Tour de France:

5th place overall classification

1977
GP Aix-en-Provence
Giro d'Italia:

7th place overall classification
