= Hubert Mathis =

French cyclist

Personal information
- Full name: Hubert Mathis
- Born: 12 March 1950 (age 76)

Cycling career
- Sport: Cycling
- Discipline: Road
- Role: Rider

Major wins
- 1 stage 1976 Tour de France

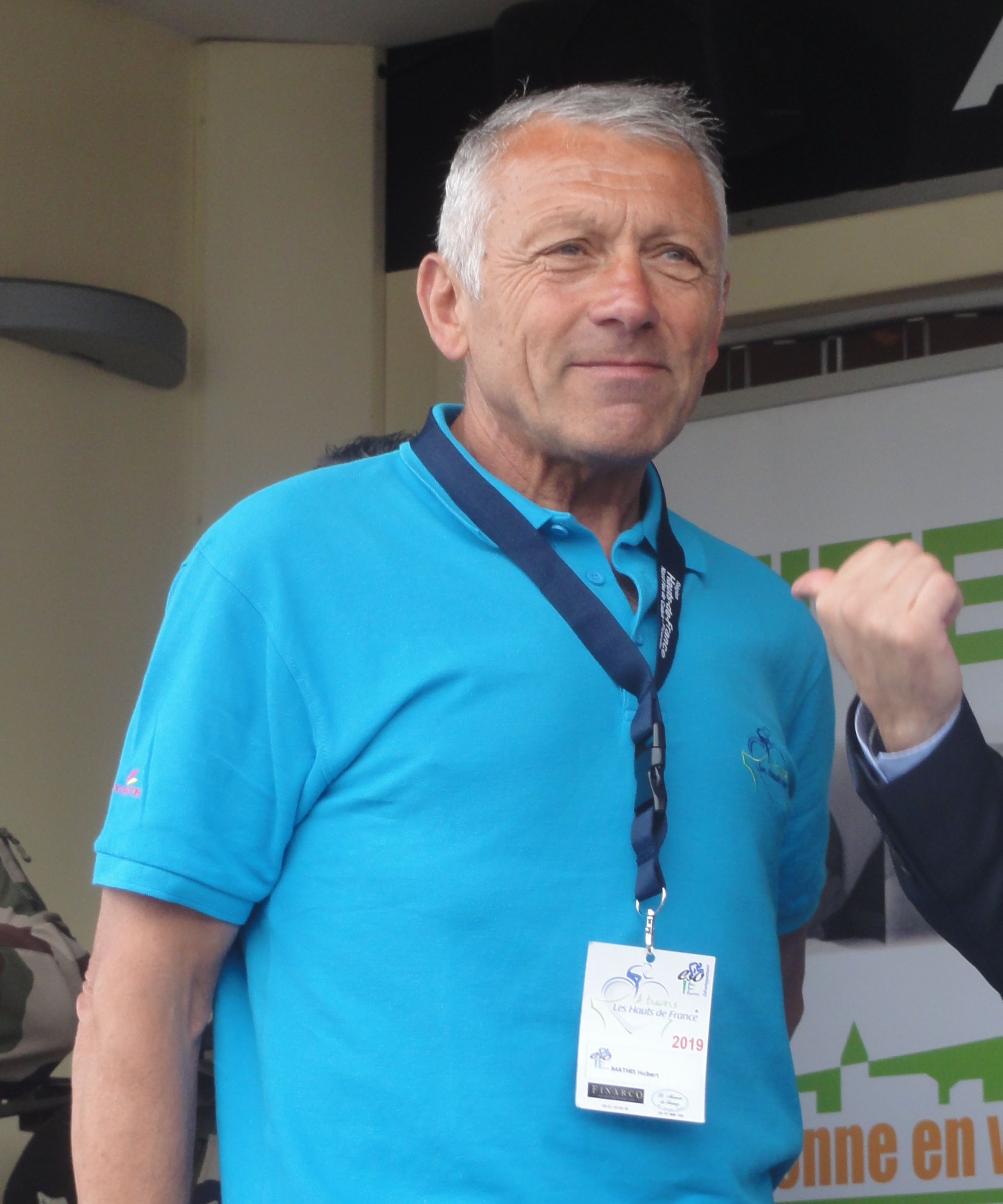
Hubert Mathis

Hubert Mathis (12 March 1950) was a French professional road bicycle racer.

== Major results ==
1976
Tour de France:

Winner stage 19

1978
GP de Soissons
