= Carlos Melero =

Spanish cyclist

Personal information
- Born: 17 December 1948 (age 77) Valladolid, Spain

Cycling career
- Sport: Cycling

Carlos Melero (born 17 December 1948) is a Spanish former cyclist. He competed in the team time trial at the 1972 Summer Olympics. He rode in the Tour de France five times and the Vuelta a España four times.
