= Herman Van der Slagmolen =

Belgian cyclist

Personal information
- Born: 31 October 1948 (age 77) Asse, Belgium

Cycling career
- Sport: Cycling
- Current team: Retired
- Discipline: Road
- Role: Rider

Professional teams
- 1970–1973: Flandria–Mars
- 1974–1977: Brooklyn
- 1978: Sanson–Campagnolo
- 1979: Flandria–Ça va seul

Herman Van der Slagmolen (born 31 October 1948) is a Belgian former professional racing cyclist. He rode in the 1972 and 1976 Tour de France.
