= Bert Pronk =

Dutch cyclist

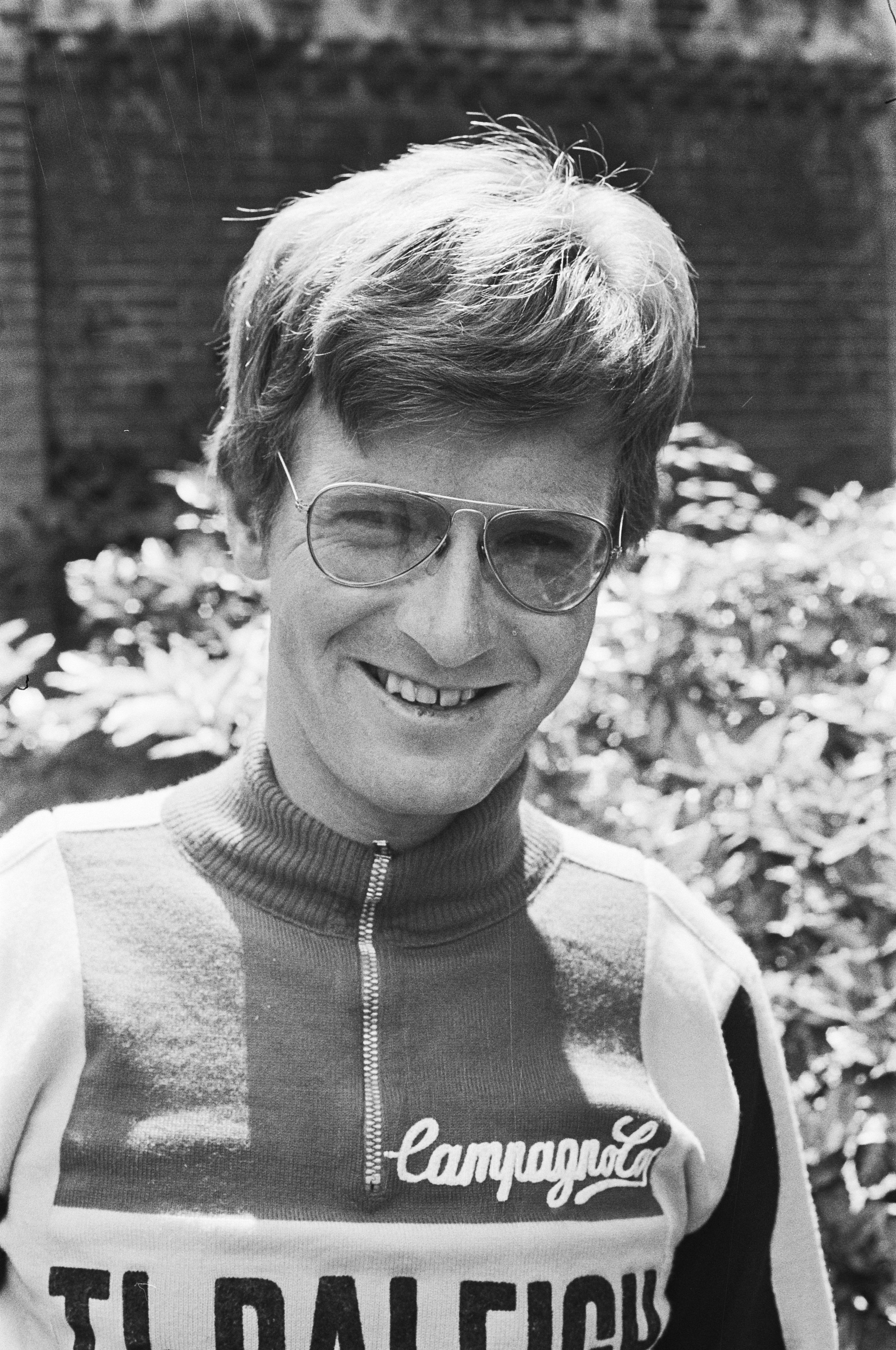
- Bert Pronk in 1977

Personal information
- Born: 24 October 1950 Scheveningen, the Netherlands
- Died: 15 March 2005 (aged 54) Alvor, Portugal

Cycling career
- Sport: Cycling

Professional teams
- 1971: Delbana
- 1974–1977: TI–Raleigh
- 1978: IJsboerke–Gios
- 1979: TI–Raleigh–McGregor
- 1980–1981: TI–Raleigh–Creda
- 1982: Kotter–Bibione–Campagnolo

De Posttrein

Bert Pronk (24 October 1950 – 15 March 2005) was a Dutch road cyclist who won the Tour de Luxembourg and Ronde van Nederland in 1977. He rode Tour de France in 1976, 1977, 1979 and 1980 with the best achievement of 12th place in 1977.

A few years before his death he was diagnosed with cancer, but seemed to fully recover and resume his sport activities. He died suddenly while on vacations in Portugal.

== 1980 Tour team time trial disaster ==
The 1980 Tour de France had an early TTT. The prologue was the day before, and in the morning the riders had had a stage of 133 km (83 mi). Bert Pronk had jumped ahead, riding in the breakaway. That helped Jan Raas to win the stage. Pronk didn't recuperate fast, and like every TI–Raleigh rider who was not a TT specialist, or had a bad day, he did fear the TTT that afternoon.

Pronk followed the team custom of pulling as long as he could, but he dropped off early in the 46 km (29 mi) long race. When your team is one of the last to start, there are not a lot of cars or teams behind you to pull yourself up to. TI–Raleigh won, but went so fast, that Pronk finished outside the time limit. He went home after two days in the Tour, and had to watch Joop Zoetemelk's victory from the couch.
