= Georges Talbourdet =

French cyclist

Personal information
- Full name: Georges Talbourdet
- Born: 5 December 1951 Erquy, France
- Died: 5 December 2011 (aged 60) Erquy, France

Cycling career
- Sport: Cycling
- Role: Rider

Professional teams
- 1973–1976: Gan–Mercier–Hutchinson
- 1977–1978: Peugeot–Esso–Michelin
- 1979: Les Amis du Tour

Georges Talbourdet (5 December 1951 – 5 December 2011) was a French racing cyclist. His sporting career began with La Hutte-Gitane. He won the French national road race title in 1974.
