= Patrick Béon =

French cyclist

Personal information
- Born: 5 February 1950 (age 76) Gosné, France

Cycling career
- Sport: Cycling
- Role: Rider
- Rider type: Sprinter

Professional teams
- 1973–1975: Peugeot-BP-Michelin
- 1975–1978: Peugeot-Esso-Michelin
- 1979: Carlos-Galli G.B.C.

Major wins
- 1973 Paris–Roubaix, U23; 1975 Circuit des genets verts 1975 Classement General Étoile de Bessèges; 1976 Critérium International; 1979 Stage 2 Étoile de Bessèges

Patrick Béon (born 5 February 1950) is a French former professional racing cyclist. His sporting career began with ACBB Paris. He rode in three editions of the Tour de France, from 1975 through 1977. His team leader, Bernard Thévenet, won the general classification of the Tour de France in 1975 and 1977.

In 1976, Patrick Beon was selected to represent France in the road race at the Cycling World Championships.

In 2000, Beon was arrested and charged with trafficking illegal substances. And, in 2002, he was sentenced to two years in prison.

In 2009, Patrick Beon (with Florian Joyard) wrote an autobiography, "Nu dans mes bottes".
