= Antonio Menéndez =

Spanish cyclist

Personal information
- Full name: Antonio Menéndez González
- Born: 18 August 1946 (age 80) Cangas del Narcea, Spain

Cycling career
- Sport: Cycling
- Current team: Retired
- Discipline: Road
- Role: Rider

Professional teams
- 1970: Karpy
- 1971: La Casera–Peña Bahamontes
- 1972: Karpy
- 1973–1977: Kas–Kaskol
- 1978: Teka
- 1979: Moliner–Vereco

Antonio Menéndez (born 18 August 1946 in Cangas del Narcea) is a Spanish former professional cyclist.

== Major results ==
1970
1st Stage 3 Setmana Catalana de Ciclisme
3rd Overall Vuelta a Asturias
1973
1st Stage 4 Volta a Catalunya
1974
1st GP Llodio
1st GP Vizcaya
1st Stage 3 Vuelta a Asturias
3rd National Road Race Championships
3rd Prueba Villafranca de Ordizia
1975
1st Tour of Corsica
1st Stage 11 Vuelta a España
2nd GP Llodio
1976
1st Stage 11 Giro d'Italia
1978
1st Stage 2 Vuelta a los Valles Mineros
2nd Prueba Villafranca de Ordizia
3rd National Road Race Championships
