= Lejeune–BP =

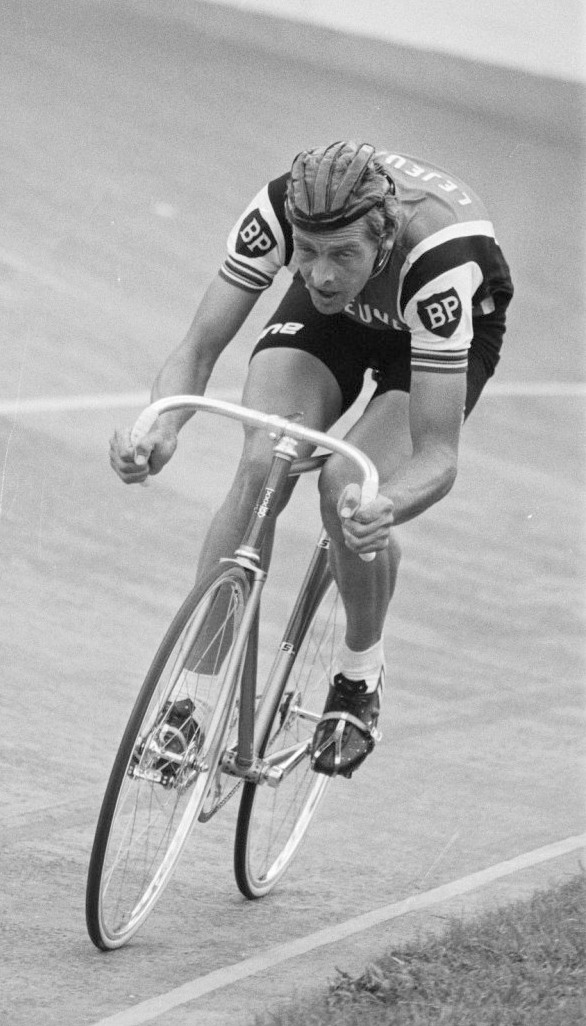
- Roy Schuiten in 1977

Team information
- Registered: France
- Founded: 1976
- Disbanded: 1978
- Discipline: Road
- Bicycles: Cycles Lejeune

Key personnel
- General manager: Henry Anglade (1976-1978); Pierre Schoor (1976–1978)

Team name history
- 1976–1978: Lejeune–BP

Lejeune–BP was a French professional cycling team that existed from 1976 to 1978. Its sponsors were Cycles Lejeune and BP. They are recorded as having 11 UCI wins.
