= List of teams and cyclists in the 1975 Tour de France =

List of cyclists

There were 14 teams participating in the 1975 Tour de France, with 10 cyclists each:

- Molteni
- Gan–Mercier
- Kas
- Jolly Ceramica
- Super Ser
- Peugeot
- Bianchi
- Gitane
- Filotex
- Flandria–Carpenter
- Sporting–Lejeune
- Miko–de Gribaldy
- Frisol–GBC
- Jobo–Sablière–Wolber

Eddy Merckx, who had won all five times that he participated, was again the big favourite. Merckx' first part of the season had been going well, winning Milan–San Remo, the Tour of Flanders and Liège–Bastogne–Liège. If Merckx would win again, he would beat Jacques Anquetil and become the first cyclist to win the Tour six times. Merckx did not care about that record: "The idea doesn't interest me very much because then people would want me to go for a seventh and then an eighth".

A few months before the race, Merckx was unsure if he would start the Tour. His race schedule had been very busy, and he thought to ride the Giro and the Tour in the same year would not work. Merckx preferred to ride the Tour, but his Italian team preferred the Giro. Bernard Thévenet contracted shingles during the 1975 Vuelta a España, but recovered and won the Dauphiné Liberé.

== Start list ==
=== By team ===
Molteni
No.	Rider	Pos.
1	Eddy Merckx (BEL)	2
2	Herman Beysens (BEL)	DNF
3	Ludo Delcroix (BEL)	57
4	Jos Deschoenmaecker (BEL)	17
5	Jos Huysmans (BEL)	59
6	Edward Janssens (BEL)	9
7	Marc Lievens (BEL)	62
8	Frans Mintjens (BEL)	56
9	Karel Rottiers (BEL)	60
10	Jozef Spruyt (BEL)	DNF

Gan–Mercier
No.	Rider	Pos.
11	Raymond Poulidor (FRA)	19
12	Jean-Pierre Genet (FRA)	DNF
13	Yves Hézard (FRA)	21
14	Barry Hoban (GBR)	68
15	Gerrie Knetemann (NED)	63
16	Jean-Claude Misac (FRA)	65
17	Michel Périn (FRA)	DNF
18	Georges Talbourdet (FRA)	13
19	Gerard Vianen (NED)	66
20	Joop Zoetemelk (NED)	4

Kas
No.	Rider	Pos.
21	Francisco Galdós (ESP)	DNF
22	Gonzalo Aja (ESP)	DNF
23	José Manuel Fuente (ESP)	DNF
24	José Grande (ESP)	58
25	Vicente López Carril (ESP)	5
26	Antonio Martos (ESP)	DNF
27	Carlos Melero (ESP)	29
28	Antonio Menéndez (ESP)	DNF
29	José Pesarrodona (ESP)	34
30	Juan Zurano (ESP)	DNF

Jolly Ceramica
No.	Rider	Pos.
31	Bruno Vicino (ITA)	DNF
32	Alessio Antonini (ITA)	DNF
33	Giovanni Battaglin (ITA)	DNF
34	Emmanuele Bergamo (ITA)	DNF
35	Giovanni Dalla Bona (ITA)	DNF
36	Pierino Gavazzi (ITA)	DNF
37	Donato Giuliani (ITA)	DNF
38	Knut Knudsen (NOR)	DNF
39	Giacomo Bazzan (ITA)	DNF
40	Sandro Quintarelli (ITA)	DNF

Super Ser
No.	Rider	Pos.
41	Luis Ocaña (ESP)	DNF
42	Julián Andiano (ESP)	DNF
43	Luis Balagué (ESP)	26
44	José Casas García (ESP)	36
45	Santiago Lazcano (ESP)	DNF
46	Eddy Peelman (BEL)	DNF
47	Roger Rosiers (BEL)	DNF
48	Pedro Torres (ESP)	10
49	Sylvain Vasseur (FRA)	44
50	José Viejo (ESP)	25

Peugeot–BP
No.	Rider	Pos.
51	Bernard Thévenet (FRA)	1
52	Patrick Béon (FRA)	78
53	Bernard Bourreau (FRA)	40
54	José Catieau (FRA)	DNF
55	Jean-Pierre Danguillaume (FRA)	DNF
56	Raymond Delisle (FRA)	16
57	Jacques Esclassan (FRA)	DNF
58	Régis Ovion (FRA)	28
59	Charly Rouxel (FRA)	52
60	Guy Sibille (FRA)	DNF

Bianchi
No.	Rider	Pos.
61	Felice Gimondi (ITA)	6
62	Luigi Castelletti (ITA)	81
63	Giovanni Cavalcanti (ITA)	48
64	Fabrizio Fabbri (ITA)	33
65	Simone Fraccaro (ITA)	35
66	Tony Houbrechts (BEL)	24
67	Serge Parsani (ITA)	76
68	Martín Rodríguez (COL)	27
69	Giacinto Santambrogio (ITA)	46
70	Rik Van Linden (BEL)	79

Gitane
No.	Rider	Pos.
71	Lucien Van Impe (BEL)	3
72	René Dillen (BEL)	70
73	Gerben Karstens (NED)	50
74	Maurice Le Guilloux (FRA)	72
75	Guy Leleu (FRA)	55
76	Raymond Martin (FRA)	30
77	Mariano Martinez (FRA)	14
78	Robert Mintkiewicz (FRA)	53
79	Alain Santy (FRA)	DNF
80	Willy Teirlinck (BEL)	45

Filotex
No.	Rider	Pos.
81	Francesco Moser (ITA)	7
82	Arnaldo Caverzasi (ITA)	DNF
83	Pietro Dallai (ITA)	DNF
84	Sigfrido Fontanelli (ITA)	43
85	Joseph Fuchs (SUI)	8
86	Renato Marchetti (ITA)	39
87	Roberto Poggiali (ITA)	22
88	Ole Ritter (DEN)	47
89	Mauro Simonetti (ITA)	54
90	Roberto Sorlini (ITA)	DNF

Flandria–Carpenter–Confortluxe
No.	Rider	Pos.
91	Michel Pollentier (BEL)	23
92	Eddy Cael (BEL)	DNF
93	Wilfried David (BEL)	DNF
94	Régis Delépine (FRA)	77
95	Marc Demeyer (BEL)	42
96	Ronald De Witte (BEL)	37
97	Walter Godefroot (BEL)	51
98	Daniel Verplancke (BEL)	DNF
99	Herman Van Springel (BEL)	31
100	Gérard Moneyron (FRA)	80

Sporting–Sottomayor–Lejeune
No.	Rider	Pos.
101	Joaquim Agostinho (POR)	15
102	José Amaro (POR)	83
103	Francis Campaner (FRA)	49
104	Joaquim Carvalho (POR)	DNF
105	Fernando Ferreira (POR)	61
106	Firmino Bernardino (POR)	DNF
107	Ferdinand Julien (FRA)	20
108	Bernard Labourdette (FRA)	DNF
109	André Mollet (FRA)	DNF
110	Manuel Silva (POR)	DNF

Miko-De Gribaldy
No.	Rider	Pos.
111	Michel Laurent (FRA)	DNF
112	Lucien De Brauwere (BEL)	DNF
113	André Doyen (BEL)	69
114	Antoine Gutierrez (FRA)	DNF
115	Roger Loysch (BEL)	DNF
116	Hubert Mathis (FRA)	41
117	Patrick Perret (FRA)	DNF
118	Albert Van Vlierberghe (BEL)	32
119	Frans Van Vlierberghe (BEL)	75
120	Wilfried Wesemael (BEL)	DNF

Frisol–GBC
No.	Rider	Pos.
121	Hennie Kuiper (NED)	11
122	Donald Allan (AUS)	85
123	José De Cauwer (BEL)	67
124	Fedor den Hertog (NED)	18
125	Gérard Kamper (NED)	84
126	Ben Koken (NED)	DNF
127	Fernando Mendes (POR)	DNF
128	Cees Priem (NED)	DNF
129	Theo Smit (NED)	DNF
130	Henk Prinsen (NED)	82

Jobo–Sablière–Wolber
No.	Rider	Pos.
131	André Romero (FRA)	12
132	Jacques Boulas (FRA)	86
133	Alain Cigana (FRA)	DNF
134	André Corbeau (FRA)	DNF
135	Bernard Croyet (FRA)	DNF
136	Joël Hauvieux (FRA)	73
137	Roger Legeay (FRA)	70
138	Claude Magni (FRA)	74
139	Joël Millard (FRA)	38
140	Richard Pianaro (FRA)	64

=== By rider ===
Legend
No.	Starting number worn by the rider during the Tour
Pos.	Position in the general classification
DNF	Denotes a rider who did not finish

No.	Name	Nationality	Team	Pos.	Ref
1	Eddy Merckx	Belgium	Molteni	2	
2	Herman Beysens	Belgium	Molteni	DNF	
3	Ludo Delcroix	Belgium	Molteni	57	
4	Jos Deschoenmaecker	Belgium	Molteni	17	
5	Jos Huysmans	Belgium	Molteni	59	
6	Edward Janssens	Belgium	Molteni	9	
7	Marc Lievens	Belgium	Molteni	62	
8	Frans Mintjens	Belgium	Molteni	56	
9	Karel Rottiers	Belgium	Molteni	60	
10	Jozef Spruyt	Belgium	Molteni	DNF	
11	Raymond Poulidor	France	Gan–Mercier	19	
12	Jean-Pierre Genet	France	Gan–Mercier	DNF	
13	Yves Hézard	France	Gan–Mercier	21	
14	Barry Hoban	Great Britain	Gan–Mercier	68	
15	Gerrie Knetemann	Netherlands	Gan–Mercier	63	
16	Jean-Claude Misac	France	Gan–Mercier	65	
17	Michel Périn	France	Gan–Mercier	DNF	
18	Georges Talbourdet	France	Gan–Mercier	13	
19	Gerard Vianen	Netherlands	Gan–Mercier	66	
20	Joop Zoetemelk	Netherlands	Gan–Mercier	4	
21	Francisco Galdós	Spain	Kas	DNF	
22	Gonzalo Aja	Spain	Kas	DNF	
23	José Manuel Fuente	Spain	Kas	DNF	
24	José Grande	Spain	Kas	58	
25	Vicente López Carril	Spain	Kas	5	
26	Antonio Martos	Spain	Kas	DNF	
27	Carlos Melero	Spain	Kas	29	
28	Antonio Menéndez	Spain	Kas	DNF	
29	José Pesarrodona	Spain	Kas	34	
30	Juan Zurano	Spain	Kas	DNF	
31	Bruno Vicino	Italy	Jolly Ceramica	DNF	
32	Alessio Antonini	Italy	Jolly Ceramica	DNF	
33	Giovanni Battaglin	Italy	Jolly Ceramica	DNF	
34	Emmanuele Bergamo	Italy	Jolly Ceramica	DNF	
35	Giovanni Dalla Bona	Italy	Jolly Ceramica	DNF	
36	Pierino Gavazzi	Italy	Jolly Ceramica	DNF	
37	Donato Giuliani	Italy	Jolly Ceramica	DNF	
38	Knut Knudsen	Norway	Jolly Ceramica	DNF	
39	Giacomo Bazzan	Italy	Jolly Ceramica	DNF	
40	Sandro Quintarelli	Italy	Jolly Ceramica	DNF	
41	Luis Ocaña	Spain	Super Ser	DNF	
42	Julián Andiano	Spain	Super Ser	DNF	
43	Luis Balagué	Spain	Super Ser	26	
44	José Casas García	Spain	Super Ser	36	
45	Santiago Lazcano	Spain	Super Ser	DNF	
46	Eddy Peelman	Belgium	Super Ser	DNF	
47	Roger Rosiers	Belgium	Super Ser	DNF	
48	Pedro Torres	Spain	Super Ser	10	
49	Sylvain Vasseur	France	Super Ser	44	
50	José Viejo	Spain	Super Ser	25	
51	Bernard Thévenet	France	Peugeot–BP	1	
52	Patrick Béon	France	Peugeot–BP	78	
53	Bernard Bourreau	France	Peugeot–BP	40	
54	José Catieau	France	Peugeot–BP	DNF	
55	Jean-Pierre Danguillaume	France	Peugeot–BP	DNF	
56	Raymond Delisle	France	Peugeot–BP	16	
57	Jacques Esclassan	France	Peugeot–BP	DNF	
58	Régis Ovion	France	Peugeot–BP	28	
59	Charly Rouxel	France	Peugeot–BP	52	
60	Guy Sibille	France	Peugeot–BP	DNF	
61	Felice Gimondi	Italy	Bianchi	6	
62	Luigi Castelletti	Italy	Bianchi	81	
63	Giovanni Cavalcanti	Italy	Bianchi	48	
64	Fabrizio Fabbri	Italy	Bianchi	33	
65	Simone Fraccaro	Italy	Bianchi	35	
66	Tony Houbrechts	Belgium	Bianchi	24	
67	Serge Parsani	Italy	Bianchi	76	
68	Martín Rodríguez	Colombia	Bianchi	27	
69	Giacinto Santambrogio	Italy	Bianchi	46	
70	Rik Van Linden	Belgium	Bianchi	79	
71	Lucien Van Impe	Belgium	Gitane	3	
72	René Dillen	Belgium	Gitane	70	
73	Gerben Karstens	Netherlands	Gitane	50	
74	Maurice Le Guilloux	France	Gitane	72	
75	Guy Leleu	France	Gitane	55	
76	Raymond Martin	France	Gitane	30	
77	Mariano Martinez	France	Gitane	14	
78	Robert Mintkiewicz	France	Gitane	53	
79	Alain Santy	France	Gitane	DNF	
80	Willy Teirlinck	Belgium	Gitane	45	
81	Francesco Moser	Italy	Filotex	7	
82	Arnaldo Caverzasi	Italy	Filotex	DNF	
83	Pietro Dallai	Italy	Filotex	DNF	
84	Sigfrido Fontanelli	Italy	Filotex	43	
85	Joseph Fuchs	Switzerland	Filotex	8	
86	Renato Marchetti	Italy	Filotex	39	
87	Roberto Poggiali	Italy	Filotex	22	
88	Ole Ritter	Denmark	Filotex	47	
89	Mauro Simonetti	Italy	Filotex	54	
90	Roberto Sorlini	Italy	Filotex	DNF	
91	Michel Pollentier	Belgium	Flandria–Carpenter–Confortluxe	23	
92	Eddy Cael	Belgium	Flandria–Carpenter–Confortluxe	DNF	
93	Wilfried David	Belgium	Flandria–Carpenter–Confortluxe	DNF	
94	Régis Delépine	France	Flandria–Carpenter–Confortluxe	77	
95	Marc Demeyer	Belgium	Flandria–Carpenter–Confortluxe	42	
96	Ronald De Witte	Belgium	Flandria–Carpenter–Confortluxe	37	
97	Walter Godefroot	Belgium	Flandria–Carpenter–Confortluxe	51	
98	Daniel Verplancke	Belgium	Flandria–Carpenter–Confortluxe	DNF	
99	Herman Van Springel	Belgium	Flandria–Carpenter–Confortluxe	31	
100	Gérard Moneyron	France	Flandria–Carpenter–Confortluxe	80	
101	Joaquim Agostinho	Portugal	Sporting–Sottomayor–Lejeune	15	
102	José Amaro	Portugal	Sporting–Sottomayor–Lejeune	83	
103	Francis Campaner	France	Sporting–Sottomayor–Lejeune	49	
104	Joaquim Carvalho	Portugal	Sporting–Sottomayor–Lejeune	DNF	
105	Fernando Ferreira	Portugal	Sporting–Sottomayor–Lejeune	61	
106	Firmino Bernardino	Portugal	Sporting–Sottomayor–Lejeune	DNF	
107	Ferdinand Julien	France	Sporting–Sottomayor–Lejeune	20	
108	Bernard Labourdette	France	Sporting–Sottomayor–Lejeune	DNF	
109	André Mollet	France	Sporting–Sottomayor–Lejeune	DNF	
110	Manuel Silva	Portugal	Sporting–Sottomayor–Lejeune	DNF	
111	Michel Laurent	France	Miko–de Gribaldy	DNF	
112	Lucien De Brauwere	Belgium	Miko–de Gribaldy	DNF	
113	André Doyen	Belgium	Miko–de Gribaldy	69	
114	Antoine Gutierrez	France	Miko–de Gribaldy	DNF	
115	Roger Loysch	Belgium	Miko–de Gribaldy	DNF	
116	Hubert Mathis	France	Miko–de Gribaldy	41	
117	Patrick Perret	France	Miko–de Gribaldy	DNF	
118	Albert Van Vlierberghe	Belgium	Miko–de Gribaldy	32	
119	Frans Van Vlierberghe	Belgium	Miko–de Gribaldy	75	
120	Wilfried Wesemael	Belgium	Miko–de Gribaldy	DNF	
121	Hennie Kuiper	Netherlands	Frisol–GBC	11	
122	Donald Allan	Australia	Frisol–GBC	85	
123	José De Cauwer	Belgium	Frisol–GBC	67	
124	Fedor den Hertog	Netherlands	Frisol–GBC	18	
125	Gérard Kamper	Netherlands	Frisol–GBC	84	
126	Ben Koken	Netherlands	Frisol–GBC	DNF	
127	Fernando Mendes	Portugal	Frisol–GBC	DNF	
128	Cees Priem	Netherlands	Frisol–GBC	DNF	
129	Theo Smit	Netherlands	Frisol–GBC	DNF	
130	Henk Prinsen	Netherlands	Frisol–GBC	82	
131	André Romero	France	Jobo–Sablière–Wolber	12	
132	Jacques Boulas	France	Jobo–Sablière–Wolber	86	
133	Alain Cigana	France	Jobo–Sablière–Wolber	DNF	
134	André Corbeau	France	Jobo–Sablière–Wolber	DNF	
135	Bernard Croyet	France	Jobo–Sablière–Wolber	DNF	
136	Joël Hauvieux	France	Jobo–Sablière–Wolber	73	
137	Roger Legeay	France	Jobo–Sablière–Wolber	70	
138	Claude Magni	France	Jobo–Sablière–Wolber	74	
139	Joël Millard	France	Jobo–Sablière–Wolber	38	
140	Richard Pianaro	France	Jobo–Sablière–Wolber	64	
