= 1975 Tour de France =

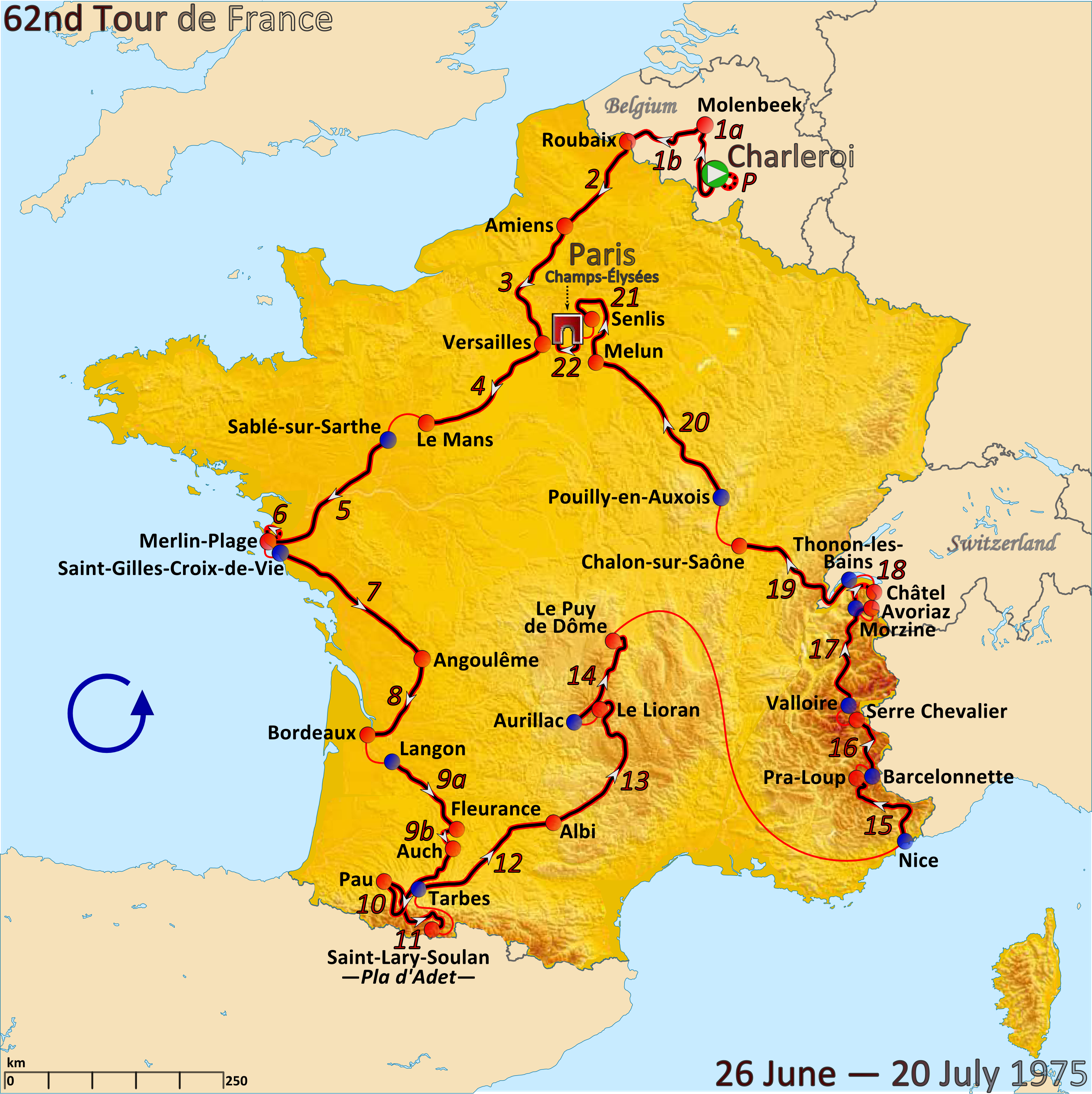
- Route of the 1975 Tour de France

Race details
- Dates: 26 June – 20 July 1975
- Stages: 22 + Prologue, including two split stages
- Distance: 4,000 km (2,485 mi)
- Winning time: 114h 35' 31"

Results
Jersey awarded to the overall winner	Winner	Bernard Thévenet (FRA)	(Peugeot–BP–Michelin)
	Second	Eddy Merckx (BEL)	(Molteni–RYC)
	Third	Lucien Van Impe (BEL)	(Gitane–Campagnolo)
Jersey awarded to the points classification winner	Points	Rik Van Linden (BEL)	(Bianchi–Campagnolo)
Jersey awarded to the mountains classification winner	Mountains	Lucien Van Impe (BEL)	(Gitane–Campagnolo)
Jersey awarded to the youth classification winner	Youth	Francesco Moser (ITA)	(Filotex)
	Sprints	Marc Demeyer (BEL)	(Carpenter–Confortluxe–Flandria)
	Combativity	Eddy Merckx (BEL)	(Molteni–RYC)
	Team	Gan–Mercier–Hutchinson	
	Team points	Gan–Mercier–Hutchinson	

The 1975 Tour de France was the 62nd edition of the Tour de France, one of cycling's Grand Tours. It took place between 26 June and 20 July, with 22 stages covering a distance of 4,000 km (2,485 mi). Eddy Merckx was attempting to win his sixth Tour de France, but became a victim of violence. Many French spectators were upset that a Belgian might beat the record of five wins set by France's Jacques Anquetil. During stage 14 a spectator leapt from the crowd and punched Merckx in the kidney. Frenchman Bernard Thévenet took over the lead. After Merckx subsequently fell and broke his cheekbone, he was unable to challenge Thévenet, who went on to win the Tour with Merckx second.

Belgian cyclists were successful in the secondary classifications: the points classification was won by Rik Van Linden, mountains classification by Lucien Van Impe, and the intermediate sprints classification by Marc Demeyer. For the first time, there was young rider classification, won by Italian Francesco Moser.

== Teams ==
There were 14 teams participating, with 10 cyclists each.

The teams entering the race were:

- Molteni–RYC
- Gan–Mercier–Hutchinson
- Kas–Kaskol
- Jollj Ceramica
- Super Ser
- Peugeot–BP–Michelin
- Bianchi–Campagnolo
- Gitane–Campagnolo
- Filotex
- Carpenter–Confortluxe–Flandria
- Sporting–Sottomayor
- Miko–de Gribaldy
- Frisol–G.B.C.
- Jobo–Wolber–Sablière

== Pre-race favourites ==
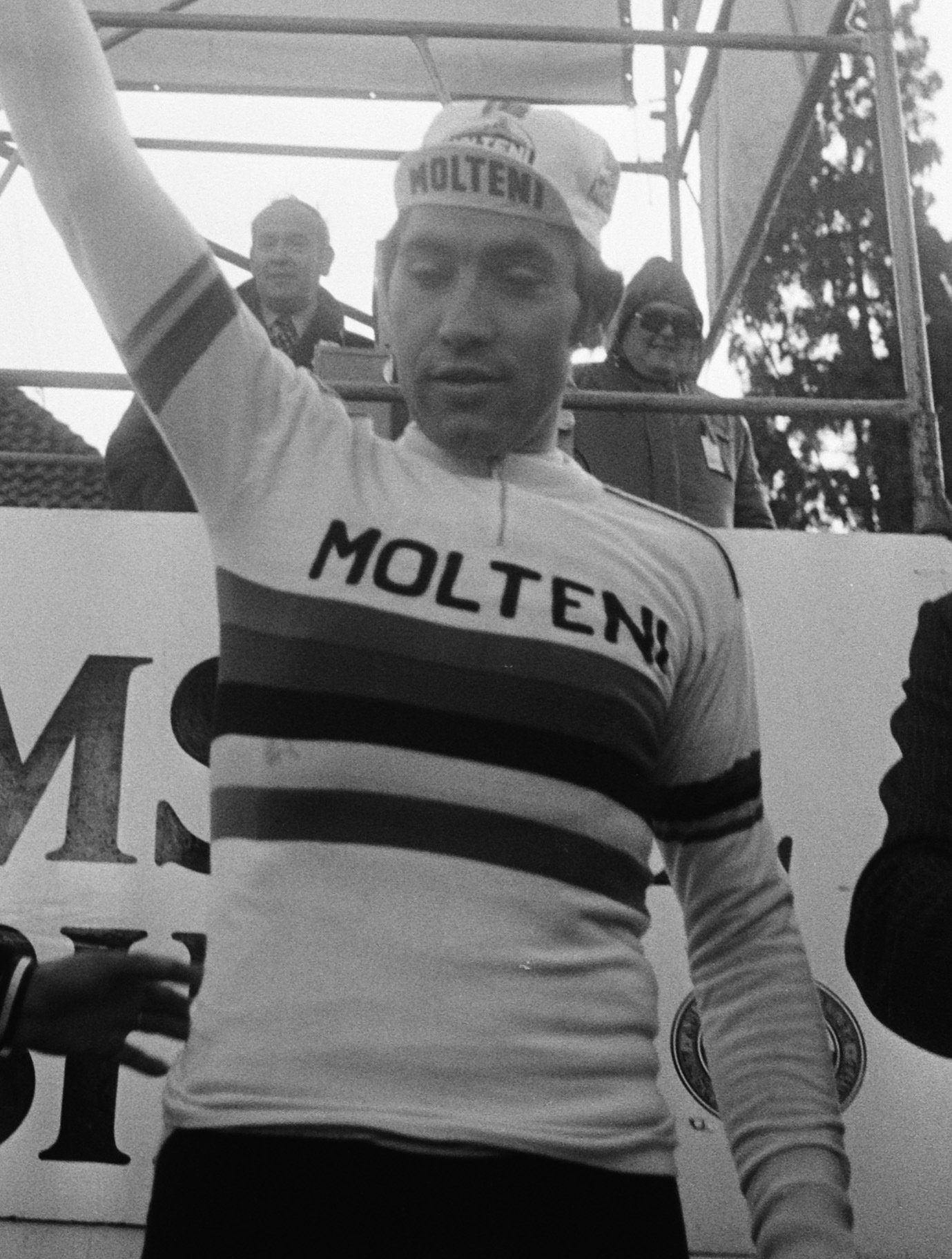
Five-time winner of the general classification Eddy Merckx (pictured at the 1975 Amstel Gold Race)

Eddy Merckx, who had won all five times that he participated, was again the big favourite. Merckx' first part of the season had been going well, winning Milan–San Remo, the Tour of Flanders and Liège–Bastogne–Liège. If Merckx would win again, he would beat Jacques Anquetil and become the first cyclist to win the Tour six times. Merckx did not care about that record: "The idea doesn't interest me very much because then people would want me to go for a seventh and then an eighth".

A few months before the race, Merckx was unsure if he would start the Tour. His race schedule had been very busy, and he thought riding the Giro and the Tour in the same year would not work. Merckx preferred to ride the Tour, but his Italian team preferred the Giro.

Bernard Thévenet contracted shingles during the 1975 Vuelta a España, but recovered and won the Dauphiné Liberé.

== Route and stages ==
The 1975 Tour de France started on 26 June, and had two rest days, the first in Auch the second after the finish on the Puy de Dôme, during which the cyclists were transferred to Nice. The 1975 Tour de France did not include a team time trial for the first time since 1962. After 1975, it would be included again every year until 1995. The final stage had become more popular over the years, and the Tour organisers therefore moved the finish line from the Vélodrome de Vincennes to the more prestigious Champs-Élysées. The highest point of elevation in the race was 2,360 m (7,740 ft) at the summit of the Col d'Izoard mountain pass on stage 16.

Stage characteristics and winners
Stage	Date	Course	Distance	Type	Winner
P	26 June	Charleroi (Belgium)	6 km (3.7 mi)	Individual time trial	Francesco Moser (ITA)
1a	27 June	Charleroi (Belgium) to Molenbeek (Belgium)	94 km (58 mi)	Plain stage	Cees Priem (NED)
1b	27 June	Molenbeek (Belgium) to Roubaix	109 km (68 mi)	Plain stage	Rik Van Linden (BEL)
2	28 June	Roubaix to Amiens	121 km (75 mi)	Plain stage	Ronald de Witte (BEL)
3	29 June	Amiens to Versailles	170 km (110 mi)	Plain stage	Karel Rottiers (BEL)
4	30 June	Versailles to Le Mans	223 km (139 mi)	Plain stage	Jacques Esclassan (FRA)
5	1 July	Sablé-sur-Sarthe to Merlin-Plage	222 km (138 mi)	Plain stage	Theo Smit (NED)
6	2 July	Merlin-Plage	16 km (9.9 mi)	Individual time trial	Eddy Merckx (BEL)
7	3 July	Saint-Gilles-Croix-de-Vie to Angoulême	236 km (147 mi)	Plain stage	Francesco Moser (ITA)
8	4 July	Angoulême to Bordeaux	134 km (83 mi)	Plain stage	Barry Hoban (GBR)
9a	5 July	Langon to Fleurance	131 km (81 mi)	Plain stage	Theo Smit (NED)
9b	5 July	Fleurance to Auch	37 km (23 mi)	Individual time trial	Eddy Merckx (BEL)
	6 July	Auch		Rest day	
10	7 July	Auch to Pau	206 km (128 mi)	Stage with mountain(s)	Felice Gimondi (ITA)
11	8 July	Pau to Saint-Lary-Soulan Pla d'Adet	160 km (99 mi)	Stage with mountain(s)	Joop Zoetemelk (NED)
12	9 July	Tarbes to Albi	242 km (150 mi)	Plain stage	Gerrie Knetemann (NED)
13	10 July	Albi to Super-Lioran	260 km (160 mi)	Stage with mountain(s)	Michel Pollentier (BEL)
14	11 July	Aurillac to Puy de Dôme	174 km (108 mi)	Stage with mountain(s)	Lucien Van Impe (BEL)
	12 July	Nice		Rest day	
15	13 July	Nice to Pra-Loup	217 km (135 mi)	Stage with mountain(s)	Bernard Thévenet (FRA)
16	14 July	Barcelonnette to Serre Chevalier	107 km (66 mi)	Stage with mountain(s)	Bernard Thévenet (FRA)
17	15 July	Valloire to Morzine Avoriaz	225 km (140 mi)	Stage with mountain(s)	Vicente López Carril (ESP)
18	16 July	Morzine to Châtel	40 km (25 mi)	Individual time trial	Lucien Van Impe (BEL)
19	17 July	Thonon-les-Bains to Chalon-sur-Saône	229 km (142 mi)	Stage with mountain(s)	Rik Van Linden (BEL)
20	18 July	Pouilly-en-Auxois to Melun	256 km (159 mi)	Plain stage	Giacinto Santambrogio (ITA)
21	19 July	Melun to Senlis	220 km (140 mi)	Plain stage	Rik Van Linden (BEL)
22	20 July	Paris to Paris (Champs-Élysées)	164 km (102 mi)	Plain stage	Walter Godefroot (BEL)
	Total		4,000 km (2,485 mi)		

== Race overview ==
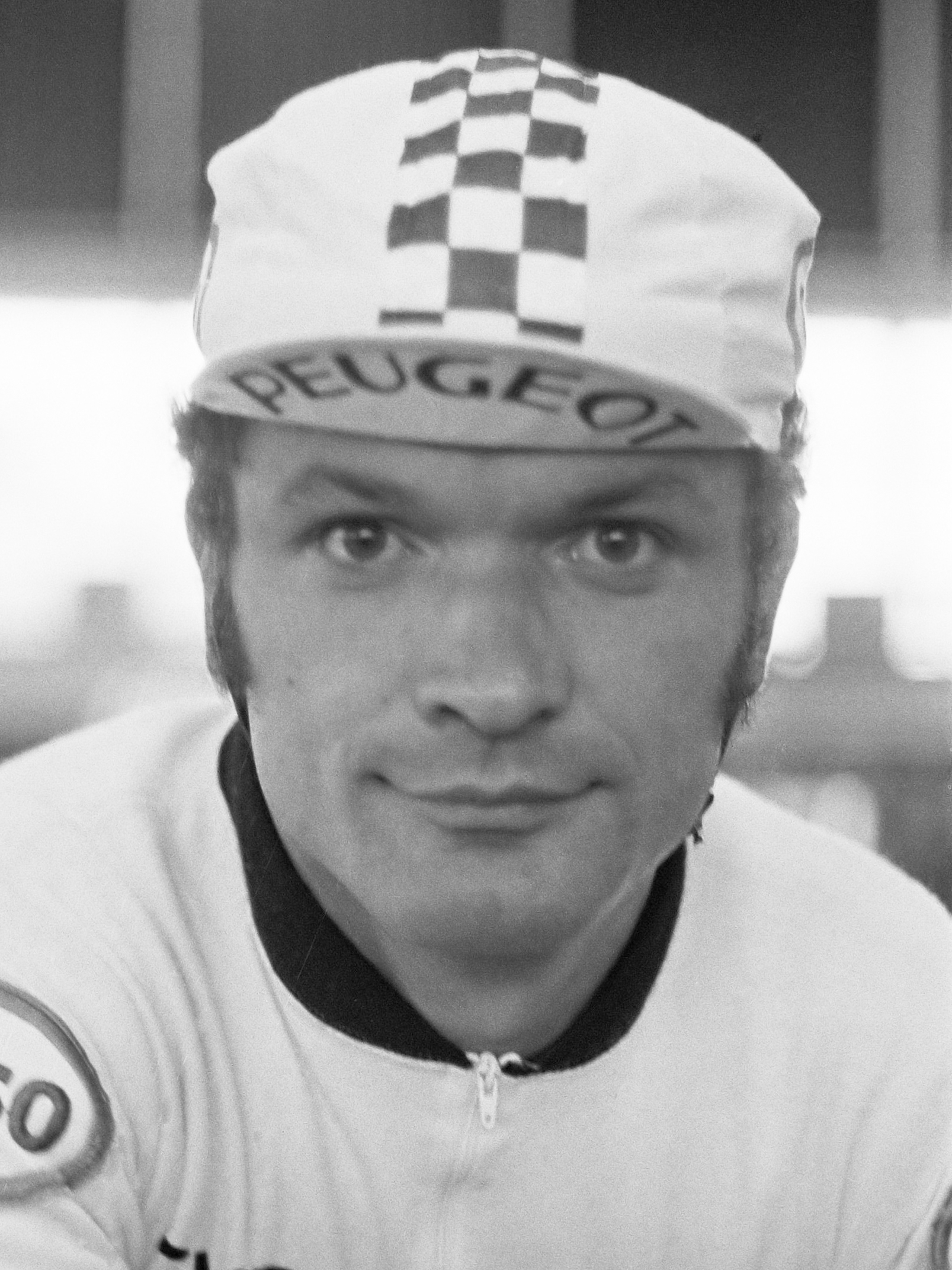
Bernard Thévenet (pictured in 1978), winner of the general classification

Francesco Moser won the prologue, and kept the lead until the first time trial. Merckx started the Tour aggressively, which caused the peloton to split in two groups in the first stage. Eddy Merckx and Moser were in the first group, and won a minute on most of their competitors. In the second part of the first stage, the field split again, but this time Thevenet and Poulidor were also in the first group. In stage six, a time trial, Merckx beat Moser and became the leader.

The first climbing was done in the tenth stage, but the favourites stayed together, and the general classification was not changed. The major Pyrenéan mountains were scheduled in stage eleven. In that stage, Bernard Thévenet and Joop Zoetemelk escaped together, while Merckx could not follow them. Zoetemelk won, with Merckx almost one minute behind. From this point on only Thevenet, Lucien Van Impe, Zoetemelk and Merckx had a realistic chance of winning the maillot jaune as the other favourites finished much later, and lost their hopes of winning the Tour. The fourteenth stage had its finish on top of the Puy de Dôme. When Merckx was about to catch Joop Zoetemelk, a French spectator punched Merckx in the stomach. Zoetemelk did not capitalize and gain time on Merckx because of this as they crossed the finish line with the same time 0:49 behind stage winner Van Impe, who did win some time over the rest of the field together with Thevenet who came in a few seconds behind Van Impe.

After the rest day, the fifteenth stage would end in Pra-Loup. Merckx was still the leader, and escaped from the rest. But on the final climb, Merckx was out of energy, and Thévenet was able to reach Merckx two kilometres from the finish, leave Merckx behind, and win with a margin of two minutes. Trying to follow Gimondi on a downhill, the team car of Bianchi went off the road, falling 150 meters down a cliff. The mechanic separated from the car, landed in a tree and survived. Thévenet was the new leader, and improved his margin in the sixteenth stage by winning with more than two minutes on Merckx.

While riding to the start of the seventeenth stage, Merckx collided with Ole Ritter, and broke a cheekbone. Merckx' broken cheekbone gave him problems with eating, and the Tour doctor gave him the advice to abandon the race. Merckx decided to stay in the race, because of the prize money for his teammates that his second place in the general classification and other classifications would earn them.

=== Doping ===
After every stage in the 1975 Tour de France, the leader of the race, the winner of the stage and the runner-up, and two random cyclists were checked. In total, 110 tests were done, of which three returned positive, Régis Delépine (after stage 5), Felice Gimondi and José-Luis Viejo (both after stage 15). All three were fined with 1000 Swiss Francs, received one month suspended sentence, were set back to the last place in the stage where they tested positive, and received 10 minutes penalty time in the general classification. This meant that Gimondi, who initially finished the Tour in fifth place, was set back to the sixth place.

== Classification leadership and minor prizes ==
There were several classifications in the 1975 Tour de France, four of them awarding jerseys to their leaders. The most important was the general classification, calculated by adding each cyclist's finishing times on each stage. The cyclist with the least accumulated time was the race leader, identified by the yellow jersey; the winner of this classification is considered the winner of the Tour. Time bonuses for stage winners were removed for the 1975 Tour.

Additionally, there was a points classification, where cyclists got points for finishing among the best in a stage finish, or in intermediate sprints. The cyclist with the most points lead the classification, and was identified with a green jersey.

There was also a mountains classification. The organisation had categorised some climbs as either first, second, third, or fourth-category; points for this classification were won by the first cyclists that reached the top of these climbs first, with more points available for the higher-categorised climbs. The cyclist with the most points lead the classification. 1975 was the first year that the leader of the classification wore a white jersey with red polka dots.

The combination classification was removed, and the young rider classification was added. This was decided the same way as the general classification, but only neo-professionals were eligible, and the leader wore a white jersey.

The fifth individual classification was the intermediate sprints classification. This classification had similar rules as the points classification, but only points were awarded on intermediate sprints. In 1975, this classification had no associated jersey.

For the team classification, the times of the best three cyclists per team on each stage were added; the leading team was the team with the lowest total time. The riders in the team that led this classification were identified by yellow caps. There was also a team points classification. Cyclists received points according to their finishing position on each stage, with the first rider receiving one point. The first three finishers of each team had their points combined, and the team with the fewest points led the classification. The riders of the team leading this classification wore green caps.

In addition, there was a combativity award, in which a jury composed of journalists gave points after certain stages to the cyclist they considered most combative. The split stages each had a combined winner. At the conclusion of the Tour, Eddy Merckx won the overall super-combativity award, also decided by journalists. The Souvenir Henri Desgrange was given in honour of Tour founder Henri Desgrange to the first rider to pass the summit of the Col du Télégraphe on stage 17. This prize was won by Luis Balagué.

Classification leadership by stage
Stage	Stage winner	General classification	Points classification	Mountains classification	Young rider classification	Intermediate sprints classification	Team classifications		Combativity award
Stage	Stage winner	General classification	Points classification	Mountains classification	Young rider classification	Intermediate sprints classification	By time	By points	Combativity award
P	Francesco Moser	Francesco Moser	Francesco Moser	no award	Francesco Moser	no award	Gan–Mercier–Hutchinson	Gan–Mercier–Hutchinson	no award
1a	Cees Priem	Francesco Moser	Eddy Merckx	Joop Zoetemelk	Francesco Moser	Marc Demeyer	Gan–Mercier–Hutchinson	Carpenter–Confortluxe–Flandria	Eddy Merckx
1b	Rik Van Linden	Francesco Moser	Francesco Moser	Joop Zoetemelk	Francesco Moser	Marc Demeyer	Carpenter–Confortluxe–Flandria	Carpenter–Confortluxe–Flandria	Eddy Merckx
2	Ronald De Witte	Francesco Moser	Rik Van Linden	Lucien Van Impe	Francesco Moser	Marc Demeyer	Carpenter–Confortluxe–Flandria	Carpenter–Confortluxe–Flandria	Jean-Claude Misac
3	Karel Rottiers	Francesco Moser	Rik Van Linden	Lucien Van Impe	Francesco Moser	Marc Demeyer	Carpenter–Confortluxe–Flandria	Carpenter–Confortluxe–Flandria	Jean-Claude Misac
4	Jacques Esclassan	Francesco Moser	Rik Van Linden	Lucien Van Impe	Francesco Moser	Marc Demeyer	Carpenter–Confortluxe–Flandria	Carpenter–Confortluxe–Flandria	Martín Emilio Rodríguez
5	Theo Smit	Francesco Moser	Rik Van Linden	Lucien Van Impe	Francesco Moser	Marc Demeyer	Carpenter–Confortluxe–Flandria	Carpenter–Confortluxe–Flandria	Michel Laurent
6	Eddy Merckx	Eddy Merckx	Rik Van Linden	Lucien Van Impe	Francesco Moser	Marc Demeyer	Carpenter–Confortluxe–Flandria	Carpenter–Confortluxe–Flandria	Yves Hézard
7	Francesco Moser	Eddy Merckx	Rik Van Linden	Lucien Van Impe	Francesco Moser	Marc Demeyer	Carpenter–Confortluxe–Flandria	Carpenter–Confortluxe–Flandria	Luis Ocaña
8	Barry Hoban	Eddy Merckx	Rik Van Linden	Lucien Van Impe	Francesco Moser	Marc Demeyer	Carpenter–Confortluxe–Flandria	Carpenter–Confortluxe–Flandria	Fedor den Hertog
9a	Theo Smit	Eddy Merckx	Rik Van Linden	Lucien Van Impe	Francesco Moser	Marc Demeyer	Carpenter–Confortluxe–Flandria	Gan–Mercier–Hutchinson	Guy Sibille
9b	Eddy Merckx	Eddy Merckx	Rik Van Linden	Lucien Van Impe	Francesco Moser	Marc Demeyer	Gan–Mercier–Hutchinson	Gan–Mercier–Hutchinson	Guy Sibille
10	Felice Gimondi	Eddy Merckx	Rik Van Linden	Lucien Van Impe	Francesco Moser	Marc Demeyer	Gan–Mercier–Hutchinson	Gan–Mercier–Hutchinson	Lucien Van Impe
11	Joop Zoetemelk	Eddy Merckx	Rik Van Linden	Lucien Van Impe	Giovanni Battaglin	Marc Demeyer	Gan–Mercier–Hutchinson	Gan–Mercier–Hutchinson	Joop Zoetemelk
12	Gerrie Knetemann	Eddy Merckx	Rik Van Linden	Lucien Van Impe	Giovanni Battaglin	Marc Demeyer	Gan–Mercier–Hutchinson	Gan–Mercier–Hutchinson	Gerrie Knetemann
13	Michel Pollentier	Eddy Merckx	Rik Van Linden	Lucien Van Impe	Francesco Moser	Marc Demeyer	Gan–Mercier–Hutchinson	Gan–Mercier–Hutchinson	Hennie Kuiper
14	Lucien Van Impe	Eddy Merckx	Rik Van Linden	Lucien Van Impe	Francesco Moser	Marc Demeyer	Gan–Mercier–Hutchinson	Gan–Mercier–Hutchinson	Eddy Merckx
15	Bernard Thévenet	Bernard Thévenet	Rik Van Linden	Lucien Van Impe	Francesco Moser	Marc Demeyer	Gan–Mercier–Hutchinson	Gan–Mercier–Hutchinson	Eddy Merckx
16	Bernard Thévenet	Bernard Thévenet	Rik Van Linden	Lucien Van Impe	Francesco Moser	Marc Demeyer	Gan–Mercier–Hutchinson	Gan–Mercier–Hutchinson	Joop Zoetemelk
17	Vicente López Carril	Bernard Thévenet	Rik Van Linden	Lucien Van Impe	Francesco Moser	Marc Demeyer	Gan–Mercier–Hutchinson	Gan–Mercier–Hutchinson	Vicente López Carril
18	Lucien Van Impe	Bernard Thévenet	Rik Van Linden	Lucien Van Impe	Francesco Moser	Marc Demeyer	Gan–Mercier–Hutchinson	Gan–Mercier–Hutchinson	Ole Ritter
19	Rik Van Linden	Bernard Thévenet	Rik Van Linden	Lucien Van Impe	Francesco Moser	Marc Demeyer	Gan–Mercier–Hutchinson	Gan–Mercier–Hutchinson	Jean-Claude Misac
20	Giacinto Santambrogio	Bernard Thévenet	Rik Van Linden	Lucien Van Impe	Francesco Moser	Marc Demeyer	Gan–Mercier–Hutchinson	Gan–Mercier–Hutchinson	Roger Legeay
21	Rik Van Linden	Bernard Thévenet	Rik Van Linden	Lucien Van Impe	Francesco Moser	Marc Demeyer	Gan–Mercier–Hutchinson	Gan–Mercier–Hutchinson	Herman Van Springel
22	Walter Godefroot	Bernard Thévenet	Rik Van Linden	Lucien Van Impe	Francesco Moser	Marc Demeyer	Gan–Mercier–Hutchinson	Gan–Mercier–Hutchinson	Fedor den Hertog
Final		Bernard Thévenet	Rik Van Linden	Lucien Van Impe	Francesco Moser	Marc Demeyer	Gan–Mercier–Hutchinson	Gan–Mercier–Hutchinson	Eddy Merckx

== Final standings ==
Legend
A yellow jersey.	Denotes the winner of the general classification	A green jersey.	Denotes the winner of the points classification
A white jersey with red polka dots.	Denotes the winner of the mountains classification	A white jersey.	Denotes the winner of the young rider classification

=== General classification ===
Final general classification (1–10)
Rank	Rider	Team	Time
1	Bernard Thévenet (FRA)	Peugeot–BP–Michelin	114h 35' 31"
2	Eddy Merckx (BEL)	Molteni–RYC	+ 2' 47"
3	Lucien Van Impe (BEL)	Gitane–Campagnolo	+ 5' 01"
4	Joop Zoetemelk (NED)	Gan–Mercier–Hutchinson	+ 6' 42"
5	Vicente López Carril (ESP)	Kas–Kaskol	+ 19' 29"
6	Felice Gimondi (ITA)	Bianchi–Campagnolo	+ 23' 05"
7	Francesco Moser (ITA)	Filotex	+ 24' 13"
8	Josef Fuchs (SUI)	Filotex	+ 25' 51"
9	Edouard Janssens (BEL)	Molteni–RYC	+ 32' 01"
10	Pedro Torres (ESP)	Super Ser	+ 35' 36"

Final general classification (11–86)
Rank	Rider	Team	Time
11	Hennie Kuiper (NED)	Frisol–G.B.C.	+ 40' 45"
12	André Romero (FRA)	Jobo–Wolber–Sablière	+ 44' 24"
13	Georges Talbourdet (FRA)	Gan–Mercier–Hutchinson	+ 44' 49"
14	Mariano Martínez (FRA)	Gitane–Campagnolo	+ 45' 41"
15	Joaquim Agostinho (POR)	Sporting–Sottomayor	+ 50' 46"
16	Raymond Delisle (FRA)	Peugeot–BP–Michelin	+ 55' 21"
17	Jos Deschoenmaecker (BEL)	Molteni–RYC	+ 55' 24"
18	Fedor Iwan den Hertog (NED)	Frisol–G.B.C.	+ 56' 45"
19	Raymond Poulidor (FRA)	Gan–Mercier–Hutchinson	+ 58' 57"
20	Ferdinand Julien (FRA)	Sporting–Sottomayor	+ 1h 05' 27"
21	Yves Hézard (FRA)	Gan–Mercier–Hutchinson	+ 1h 05' 54"
22	Roberto Poggiali (ITA)	Filotex	+ 1h 06' 02"
23	Michel Pollentier (BEL)	Carpenter–Confortluxe–Flandria	+ 1h 15' 23"
24	Tony Houbrechts (BEL)	Bianchi–Campagnolo	+ 1h 19' 54"
25	José-Luis Viejo (ESP)	Super Ser	+ 1h 22' 29"
26	Luis Balagué (ESP)	Super Ser	+ 1h 23' 27"
27	Martín Emilio Rodríguez (COL)	Bianchi–Campagnolo	+ 1h 23' 56"
28	Régis Ovion (FRA)	Peugeot–BP–Michelin	+ 1h 29' 23"
29	Carlos Melero (ESP)	Kas–Kaskol	+ 1h 29' 23"
30	Raymond Martin (FRA)	Gitane–Campagnolo	+ 1h 34' 06"
31	Herman Van Springel (BEL)	Carpenter–Confortluxe–Flandria	+ 1h 37' 52"
32	Albert Van Vlierberghe (BEL)	Miko–de Gribaldy	+ 1h 40' 54"
33	Fabrizio Fabbri (ITA)	Bianchi–Campagnolo	+ 1h 41' 22"
34	José Pesarrodona (ESP)	Kas–Kaskol	+ 1h 42' 06"
35	Simone Fraccaro (ITA)	Bianchi–Campagnolo	+ 1h 42' 09"
36	José Casas (ESP)	Super Ser	+ 1h 43' 22"
37	Ronald De Witte (BEL)	Carpenter–Confortluxe–Flandria	+ 1h 46' 11"
38	Joël Millard (FRA)	Jobo–Wolber–Sablière	+ 1h 47' 01"
39	Renato Marchetti (ITA)	Filotex	+ 1h 55' 32"
40	Bernard Bourreau (FRA)	Peugeot–BP–Michelin	+ 1h 57' 19"
41	Hubert Mathis (FRA)	Miko–de Gribaldy	+ 1h 58' 52"
42	Marc Demeyer (BEL)	Carpenter–Confortluxe–Flandria	+ 2h 00' 39"
43	Sigfrido Fontanelli (ITA)	Filotex	+ 2h 03' 13"
44	Sylvain Vasseur (FRA)	Super Ser	+ 2h 04' 26"
45	Willy Teirlinck (BEL)	Gitane–Campagnolo	+ 2h 05' 37"
46	Giacinto Santambrogio (ITA)	Bianchi–Campagnolo	+ 2h 05' 45"
47	Ole Ritter (DEN)	Filotex	+ 2h 05' 58"
48	Giovanni Cavalcanti (ITA)	Bianchi–Campagnolo	+ 2h 06' 59"
49	Francis Campaner (FRA)	Sporting–Sottomayor	+ 2h 08' 42"
50	Gerben Karstens (NED)	Gitane–Campagnolo	+ 2h 09' 47"
51	Walter Godefroot (BEL)	Carpenter–Confortluxe–Flandria	+ 2h 15' 25"
52	Charles Rouxel (FRA)	Peugeot–BP–Michelin	+ 2h 15' 26"
53	Robert Mintkiewicz (FRA)	Gitane–Campagnolo	+ 2h 15' 56"
54	Mauro Simonetti (ITA)	Filotex	+ 2h 16' 15"
55	Guy Leleu (FRA)	Gitane–Campagnolo	+ 2h 18' 15"
56	Frans Mintjens (BEL)	Molteni–RYC	+ 2h 19' 01"
57	Ludo Delcroix (BEL)	Molteni–RYC	+ 2h 19' 02"
58	José Grande (ESP)	Kas–Kaskol	+ 2h 20' 25"
59	Jos Huysmans (BEL)	Molteni–RYC	+ 2h 20' 26"
60	Karel Rottiers (BEL)	Molteni–RYC	+ 2h 21' 37"
61	Fernando Ferreira (POR)	Sporting–Sottomayor	+ 2h 26' 52"
62	Marc Lievens (BEL)	Molteni–RYC	+ 2h 27' 05"
63	Gerrie Knetemann (NED)	Gan–Mercier–Hutchinson	+ 2h 28' 48"
64	Richard Pianaro (FRA)	Jobo–Wolber–Sablière	+ 2h 29' 01"
65	Jean-Claude Misac (FRA)	Gan–Mercier–Hutchinson	+ 2h 29' 54"
66	Gerard Vianen (NED)	Gan–Mercier–Hutchinson	+ 2h 32' 56"
67	José De Cauwer (BEL)	Frisol–G.B.C.	+ 2h 35' 17"
68	Barry Hoban (GBR)	Gan–Mercier–Hutchinson	+ 2h 41' 17"
69	Andre Doyen (BEL)	Miko–de Gribaldy	+ 2h 43' 35"
70	René Dillen (BEL)	Gitane–Campagnolo	+ 2h 44' 49"
71	Roger Legeay (FRA)	Jobo–Wolber–Sablière	+ 2h 44' 49"
72	Maurice Le Guilloux (FRA)	Gitane–Campagnolo	+ 2h 46' 48"
73	Joel Hauvieux (FRA)	Jobo–Wolber–Sablière	+ 2h 47' 26"
74	Claude Magni (FRA)	Jobo–Wolber–Sablière	+ 2h 47' 50"
75	Frans Van Vlierberghe (BEL)	Miko–de Gribaldy	+ 2h 49' 35"
76	Serge Parsani (ITA)	Bianchi–Campagnolo	+ 2h 51' 26"
77	Régis Delépine (FRA)	Carpenter–Confortluxe–Flandria	+ 2h 54' 05"
78	Patrick Béon (FRA)	Peugeot–BP–Michelin	+ 2h 54' 33"
79	Rik Van Linden (BEL)	Bianchi–Campagnolo	+ 2h 55' 56"
80	Gérard Moneyron (FRA)	Carpenter–Confortluxe–Flandria	+ 2h 58' 43"
81	Luigi Castelletti (ITA)	Bianchi–Campagnolo	+ 3h 00' 09"
82	Henk Prinsen (NED)	Frisol–G.B.C.	+ 3h 04' 47"
83	José Manuel Amaro (POR)	Sporting–Sottomayor	+ 3h 10' 13"
84	Gerard Kamper (NED)	Frisol–G.B.C.	+ 3h 16' 59"
85	Donald John Allan (AUS)	Frisol–G.B.C.	+ 3h 24' 36"
86	Jacques Boulas (FRA)	Jobo–Wolber–Sablière	+ 3h 31' 21"

=== Points classification ===
Final points classification (1–10)
Rank	Rider	Team	Points
1	Rik Van Linden (BEL)	Bianchi–Campagnolo	342
2	Eddy Merckx (BEL)	Molteni–RYC	240
3	Francesco Moser (ITA)	Filotex	199
4	Walter Godefroot (BEL)	Carpenter–Confortluxe–Flandria	190
5	Barry Hoban (GBR)	Gan–Mercier–Hutchinson	183
6	Gerben Karstens (NED)	Gitane–Campagnolo	182
7	Robert Mintkiewicz (FRA)	Gitane–Campagnolo	155
8	Joop Zoetemelk (NED)	Gan–Mercier–Hutchinson	109
9	Bernard Thévenet (FRA)	Peugeot–BP–Michelin	108
10	Lucien Van Impe (BEL)	Gitane–Campagnolo	107

=== Mountains classification ===
Final mountains classification (1–10)
Rank	Rider	Team	Points
1	Lucien Van Impe (BEL)	Gitane–Campagnolo	285
2	Eddy Merckx (BEL)	Molteni–RYC	206
3	Bernard Thévenet (FRA)	Peugeot–BP–Michelin	166
4	Joop Zoetemelk (NED)	Gan–Mercier–Hutchinson	161
5	Felice Gimondi (ITA)	Bianchi–Campagnolo	78
6	Pedro Torres (ESP)	Super Ser	63
7	Vicente López Carril (ESP)	Kas–Kaskol	58
8	Luis Balagué (ESP)	Super Ser	57
9	Jos Deschoenmaecker (BEL)	Molteni–RYC	56
10	Mariano Martínez (FRA)	Gitane–Campagnolo	48

=== Young rider classification ===
Final young rider classification (1–10)
Rank	Rider	Team	Time
1	Francesco Moser (ITA)	Filotex	114h 59' 44"
2	Hennie Kuiper (NED)	Frisol–G.B.C.	+ 16' 32"
3	André Romero (FRA)	Jobo–Wolber–Sablière	+ 20' 11"
4	Georges Talbourdet (FRA)	Gan–Mercier–Hutchinson	+ 20' 36"
5	Fedor den Hertog (NED)	Frisol–G.B.C.	+ 32' 32"
6	Ferdinand Julien (FRA)	Sporting–Sottomayor	+ 41' 24"
7	Michel Pollentier (BEL)	Carpenter–Confortluxe–Flandria	+ 51' 10"
8	José Viejo (ESP)	Super Ser	+ 57' 41"
9	Martín Emilio Rodríguez (COL)	Bianchi–Campagnolo	+ 59' 43"
10	Régis Ovion (FRA)	Peugeot–BP–Michelin	+ 1h 05' 10"

=== Intermediate sprints classification ===
Final intermediate sprints classification (1–10)
Rank	Rider	Team	Points
1	Marc Demeyer (BEL)	Carpenter–Confortluxe–Flandria	77
2	Barry Hoban (GBR)	Gan–Mercier–Hutchinson	47
3	Robert Mintkiewicz (FRA)	Gitane–Campagnolo	35
4	Guy Sibille (FRA)	Peugeot–BP–Michelin	16
5	Claude Magni (FRA)	Jobo–Wolber–Sablière	12
6	Francis Campaner (FRA)	Sporting–Sottomayor	10
7	Mariano Martínez (FRA)	Gitane–Campagnolo	9
8	Jean-Claude Misac (FRA)	Gan–Mercier–Hutchinson	9
9	Guy Leleu (FRA)	Gitane–Campagnolo	8
10	Willy Teirlinck (BEL)	Gitane–Campagnolo	8

=== Team classification ===
Final team classification (1–10)
Rank	Team	Time
1	Gan–Mercier–Hutchinson	345h 03' 49"
2	Molteni–RYC	+ 8' 28"
3	Filotex	+ 11' 17"
4	Gitane–Campagnolo	+ 20' 08"
5	Peugeot–BP–Michelin	+ 28' 47"
6	Bianchi–Campagnolo	+ 41' 13"
7	Kas–Kaskol	+ 1h 04' 48"
8	Super Ser	+ 1h 05' 22"
9	Sporting–Sottomayor	+ 2h 34' 45"
10	Frisol–G.B.C.	+ 2h 37' 19"

=== Team points classification ===
Final team points classification (1–10)
Rank	Team	Points
1	Gan–Mercier–Hutchinson	950
2	Gitane–Campagnolo	1072
3	Molteni–RYC	1425
4	Bianchi–Campagnolo	1538
5	Peugeot–BP–Michelin	1553
6	Filotex	1560
7	Carpenter–Confortluxe–Flandria	1605
8	Frisol–G.B.C.	2269
9	Super Ser	2319
10	Miko–de Gribaldy	2565

== Aftermath ==
Later, Merckx said that his decision to stay in the Tour after he broke his cheekbone was stupid. He felt that it cut his career short. He said that, instead of worrying about sharing his prize money with his teammates, he should have just paid them out of his own pockets.

Thevenet later confessed that he had used cortisones in 1975.

== Bibliography ==
- Augendre, Jacques (2016). "Guide historique" [Historical guide] (PDF). Tour de France (in French). Paris: Amaury Sport Organisation. Archived (PDF) from the original on 17 August 2016.
- McGann, Bill; McGann, Carol (2008). The Story of the Tour de France: 1965–2007. Vol. 2. Indianapolis: Dog Ear Publishing. ISBN 978-1-59858-608-4.
- Nauright, John; Parrish, Charles (2012). Sports Around the World: History, Culture, and Practice. Vol. 2. Santa Barbara, California: ABC-CLIO. ISBN 978-1-59884-300-2.
- Saunders, David (1975). Tour de France 1975. Keighley, UK: Kennedy Brothers Publishing.
- Thompson, Christopher S. (2008). The Tour de France: A Cultural History. Oakland, California: University of California Press. ISBN 978-0-520-25630-9.
- van den Akker, Pieter (2018). Tour de France Rules and Statistics: 1903–2018. Self-published. ISBN 978-1-79398-080-9.
