= 1975 Tour de France, Stage 11 to Stage 22 =

Cycling race stages

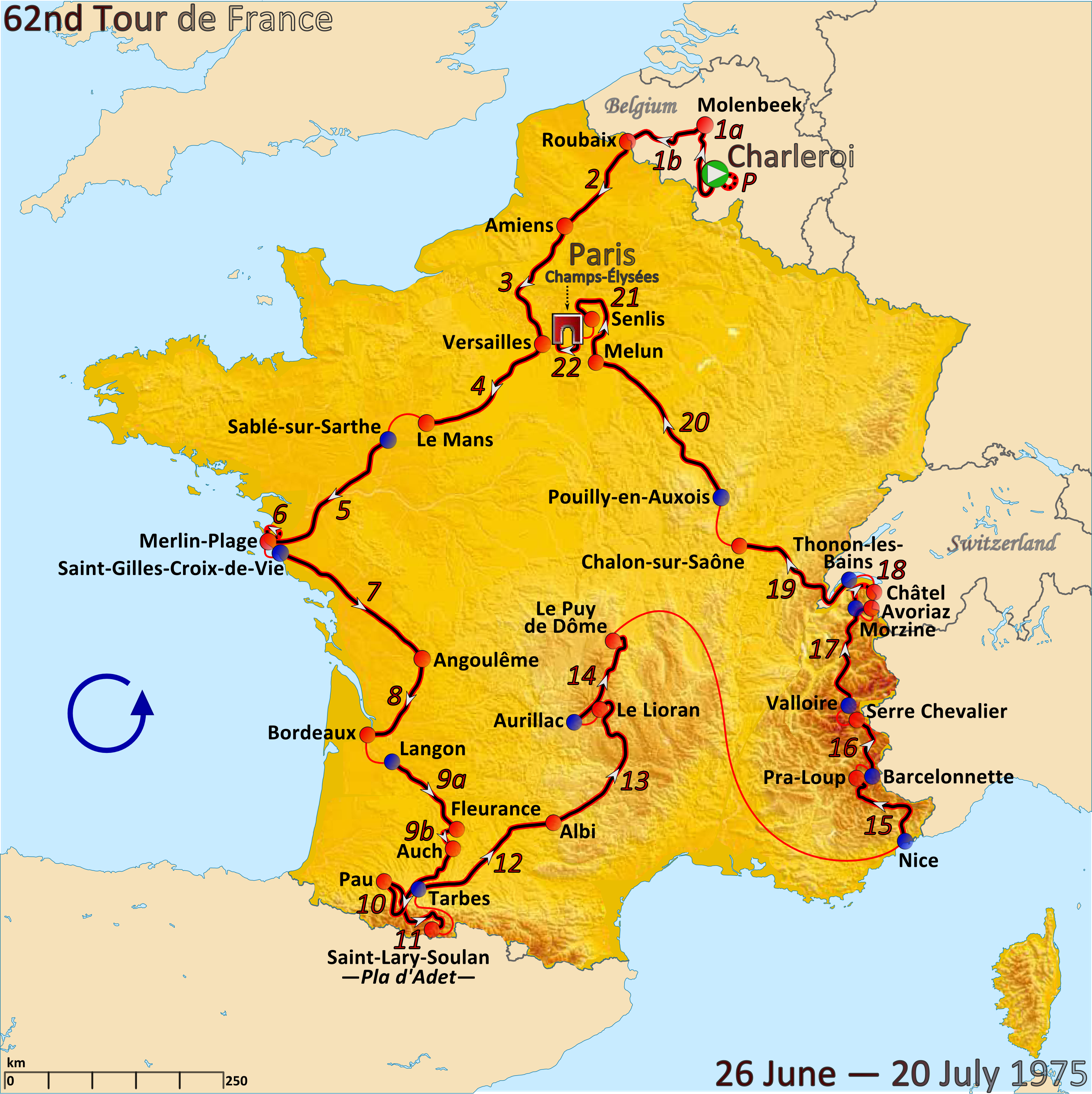
Route of the 1975 Tour de France

The 1975 Tour de France was the 62nd edition of the Tour de France, one of cycling's Grand Tours. The Tour began in Charleroi, Belgium with a prologue individual time trial on 26 June, and Stage 11 occurred on 8 July with a mountainous stage from Pau. The race finished in Paris on 20 July.

== Stage 11 ==
8 July 1975 – Pau to Saint-Lary-Soulan Pla d'Adet, 160 km (99 mi)

Stage 11 result

Rank	Rider	Team	Time
1	Joop Zoetemelk (NED)	Gan–Mercier	5h 27' 18"
2	Bernard Thévenet (FRA)	Peugeot-BP	+ 6"
3	Lucien Van Impe (BEL)	Gitane	+ 55"
4	Eddy Merckx (BEL)	Molteni	s.t.
5	Luis Ocaña (ESP)	Super Ser	+ 2' 24"
6	Vicente López Carril (ESP)	Kas	+ 3' 18"
7	André Romero (FRA)	Jobo-Sabliere-Wolber	+ 3' 52"
8	Jos Deschoenmaecker (BEL)	Molteni	+ 4' 58"
9	Francisco Galdós (ESP)	Kas	+ 5' 03"
10	Felice Gimondi (ITA)	Bianchi	+ 5' 35"

General classification after stage 11

Rank	Rider	Team	Time
1	Eddy Merckx (BEL)	Molteni	48h 18' 16"
2	Bernard Thévenet (FRA)	Peugeot-BP	+ 1' 31"
3	Joop Zoetemelk (NED)	Gan–Mercier	+ 3' 53"
4	Lucien Van Impe (BEL)	Gitane	+ 5' 18"
5	Luis Ocaña (ESP)	Super Ser	+ 6' 43"
6	Felice Gimondi (ITA)	Bianchi	+ 7' 54"
7	Raymond Poulidor (FRA)	Gan–Mercier	+ 9' 56"
=8	Giovanni Battaglin (ITA)	Jolly Ceramica	+ 9' 59"
=8	Vicente López Carril (ESP)	Kas	s.t.
10	Jean-Pierre Danguillaume (FRA)	Peugeot-BP	+ 11' 47"

== Stage 12 ==
9 July 1975 – Tarbes to Albi, 242 km (150 mi)

Stage 12 result

Rank	Rider	Team	Time
1	Gerrie Knetemann (NED)	Gan–Mercier	7h 17' 25"
2	Giovanni Cavalcanti (ITA)	Bianchi	s.t.
3	Gerben Karstens (NED)	Gitane	+ 32"
4	Rik Van Linden (BEL)	Bianchi	s.t.
5	Robert Mintkiewicz (FRA)	Gitane	s.t.
6	Albert Van Vlierberghe (BEL)	Miko-De Gribaldy	s.t.
7	Walter Godefroot (BEL)	Flandria–Carpenter–Confortluxe	s.t.
8	Cees Priem (NED)	Frisol-GBC	s.t.
9	Pierino Gavazzi (ITA)	Jolly Ceramica	s.t.
10	Jos Huysmans (BEL)	Molteni	s.t.

General classification after stage 12

Rank	Rider	Team	Time
1	Eddy Merckx (BEL)	Molteni	55h 36' 13"
2	Bernard Thévenet (FRA)	Peugeot-BP	+ 1' 31"
3	Joop Zoetemelk (NED)	Gan–Mercier	+ 3' 53"
4	Lucien Van Impe (BEL)	Gitane	+ 5' 18"
5	Luis Ocaña (ESP)	Super Ser	+ 6' 43"
6	Felice Gimondi (ITA)	Bianchi	+ 7' 54"
=7	Giovanni Battaglin (ITA)	Jolly Ceramica	+ 9' 59"
=7	Vicente López Carril (ESP)	Kas	s.t.
9	Raymond Poulidor (FRA)	Gan–Mercier	+ 10' 26"
10	Jean-Pierre Danguillaume (FRA)	Peugeot-BP	+ 11' 47"

== Stage 13 ==
10 July 1975 – Albi to Super-Lioran, 260 km (160 mi)

Stage 13 result

Rank	Rider	Team	Time
1	Michel Pollentier (BEL)	Flandria–Carpenter–Confortluxe	8h 58' 44"
2	Eddy Merckx (BEL)	Molteni	+ 25"
3	Lucien Van Impe (BEL)	Gitane	+ 26"
4	Joop Zoetemelk (NED)	Gan–Mercier	s.t.
5	Francesco Moser (ITA)	Filotex	s.t.
6	Bernard Thévenet (FRA)	Peugeot-BP	s.t.
7	Joseph Fuchs (SUI)	Filotex	+ 29"
8	Felice Gimondi (ITA)	Bianchi	+ 30"
9	Hennie Kuiper (NED)	Frisol-GBC	+ 34"
10	Fedor den Hertog (NED)	Frisol-GBC	+ 36"

General classification after stage 13

Rank	Rider	Team	Time
1	Eddy Merckx (BEL)	Molteni	64h 35' 22"
2	Bernard Thévenet (FRA)	Peugeot-BP	+ 1' 32"
3	Joop Zoetemelk (NED)	Gan–Mercier	+ 3' 54"
4	Lucien Van Impe (BEL)	Gitane	+ 5' 19"
5	Felice Gimondi (ITA)	Bianchi	+ 7' 59"
6	Vicente López Carril (ESP)	Kas	+ 10' 24"
7	Raymond Poulidor (FRA)	Gan–Mercier	+ 10' 56"
8	Francesco Moser (ITA)	Filotex	+ 11' 56"
9	Jean-Pierre Danguillaume (FRA)	Peugeot-BP	+ 12' 17"
10	Francisco Galdós (ESP)	Kas	+ 12' 25"

== Stage 14 ==
11 July 1975 – Aurillac to Puy de Dôme, 173.5 km (107.8 mi)

Stage 14 result

Rank	Rider	Team	Time
1	Lucien Van Impe (BEL)	Gitane	5h 26' 51"
2	Bernard Thévenet (FRA)	Peugeot-BP	+ 15"
3	Eddy Merckx (BEL)	Molteni	+ 49"
4	Joop Zoetemelk (NED)	Gan–Mercier	s.t.
5	André Doyen (BEL)	Miko-De Gribaldy	+ 1' 08"
6	Michel Pollentier (BEL)	Flandria–Carpenter–Confortluxe	+ 1' 10"
7	Pedro Torres (ESP)	Super Ser	+ 1' 18"
8	Francisco Galdós (ESP)	Kas	+ 1' 19"
9	Mariano Martínez (FRA)	Gitane	+ 1' 20"
10	Francesco Moser (ITA)	Filotex	+ 1' 30"

General classification after stage 14

Rank	Rider	Team	Time
1	Eddy Merckx (BEL)	Molteni	70h 03' 02"
2	Bernard Thévenet (FRA)	Peugeot-BP	+ 58"
3	Joop Zoetemelk (NED)	Gan–Mercier	+ 3' 54"
4	Lucien Van Impe (BEL)	Gitane	+ 4' 30"
5	Felice Gimondi (ITA)	Bianchi	+ 8' 54"
6	Vicente López Carril (ESP)	Kas	+ 11' 51"
7	Francesco Moser (ITA)	Filotex	+ 12' 37"
8	Raymond Poulidor (FRA)	Gan–Mercier	+ 12' 49"
9	Francisco Galdós (ESP)	Kas	+ 12' 55"
10	Jean-Pierre Danguillaume (FRA)	Peugeot-BP	+ 14' 36"

== Rest day 2 ==
12 July 1975 – Nice

== Stage 15 ==
13 July 1975 – Nice to Pra-Loup, 217.5 km (135.1 mi)

Stage 15 result

Rank	Rider	Team	Time
1	Bernard Thévenet (FRA)	Peugeot-BP	7h 46' 35"
2	Felice Gimondi (ITA)	Bianchi	+ 23"
3	Joop Zoetemelk (NED)	Gan–Mercier	+ 1' 12"
4	Lucien Van Impe (BEL)	Gitane	+ 1' 42"
5	Eddy Merckx (BEL)	Molteni	+ 1' 56"
6	Francesco Moser (ITA)	Filotex	+ 3' 12"
7	Joseph Fuchs (SUI)	Filotex	s.t.
8	Luis Balagué (ESP)	Super Ser	+ 5' 26"
9	Raymond Delisle (FRA)	Peugeot-BP	+ 6' 01"
10	Vicente López Carril (ESP)	Kas	+ 6' 16"

General classification after stage 15

Rank	Rider	Team	Time
1	Bernard Thévenet (FRA)	Peugeot-BP	77h 50' 35"
2	Eddy Merckx (BEL)	Molteni	+ 58"
3	Joop Zoetemelk (NED)	Gan–Mercier	+ 4' 08"
4	Lucien Van Impe (BEL)	Gitane	+ 5' 14"
5	Felice Gimondi (ITA)	Bianchi	+ 8' 19"
6	Francesco Moser (ITA)	Filotex	+ 14' 51"
7	Vicente López Carril (ESP)	Kas	+ 17' 09"
8	Joseph Fuchs (SUI)	Filotex	+ 17' 19"
9	Raymond Poulidor (FRA)	Gan–Mercier	+ 23' 58"
10	Edward Janssens (BEL)	Molteni	+ 25' 52"

== Stage 16 ==
14 July 1975 – Barcelonnette to Serre Chevalier, 107 km (66 mi)

Stage 16 result

Rank	Rider	Team	Time
1	Bernard Thévenet (FRA)	Peugeot-BP	3h 16' 17"
2	Eddy Merckx (BEL)	Molteni	+ 2' 22"
3	Felice Gimondi (ITA)	Bianchi	s.t.
4	Joop Zoetemelk (NED)	Gan–Mercier	s.t.
5	Lucien Van Impe (BEL)	Gitane	s.t.
6	André Romero (FRA)	Jobo-Sabliere-Wolber	s.t.
7	Vicente López Carril (ESP)	Kas	s.t.
8	Francisco Galdós (ESP)	Kas	s.t.
9	Edward Janssens (BEL)	Molteni	s.t.
10	Herman Van Springel (BEL)	Flandria–Carpenter–Confortluxe	+ 4' 08"

General classification after stage 16

Rank	Rider	Team	Time
1	Bernard Thévenet (FRA)	Peugeot-BP	81h 06' 52"
2	Eddy Merckx (BEL)	Molteni	+ 3' 20"
3	Joop Zoetemelk (NED)	Gan–Mercier	+ 6' 30"
4	Lucien Van Impe (BEL)	Gitane	+ 7' 36"
5	Felice Gimondi (ITA)	Bianchi	+ 10' 41"
6	Francesco Moser (ITA)	Filotex	+ 19' 08"
7	Vicente López Carril (ESP)	Kas	+ 19' 31"
8	Joseph Fuchs (SUI)	Filotex	+ 21' 36"
9	Edward Janssens (BEL)	Molteni	+ 28' 14"
10	Pedro Torres (ESP)	Super Ser	+ 30' 12"

== Stage 17 ==
15 July 1975 – Valloire to Morzine Avoriaz, 225 km (140 mi)

Stage 17 result

Rank	Rider	Team	Time
1	Vicente López Carril (ESP)	Kas	7h 23' 38"
2	Lucien Van Impe (BEL)	Gitane	+ 2' 11"
3	Eddy Merckx (BEL)	Molteni	+ 3' 44"
4	Joop Zoetemelk (NED)	Gan–Mercier	+ 3' 45"
5	Bernard Thévenet (FRA)	Peugeot-BP	+ 3' 46"
6	Joseph Fuchs (SUI)	Filotex	+ 3' 56"
7	Michel Pollentier (BEL)	Flandria–Carpenter–Confortluxe	+ 4' 08"
8	Raymond Delisle (FRA)	Peugeot-BP	+ 4' 17"
9	Edward Janssens (BEL)	Molteni	+ 5' 33"
10	Felice Gimondi (ITA)	Bianchi	s.t.

General classification after stage 17

Rank	Rider	Team	Time
1	Bernard Thévenet (FRA)	Peugeot-BP	88h 34' 16"
2	Eddy Merckx (BEL)	Molteni	+ 3' 18"
3	Lucien Van Impe (BEL)	Gitane	+ 6' 01"
4	Joop Zoetemelk (NED)	Gan–Mercier	+ 6' 29"
5	Felice Gimondi (ITA)	Bianchi	+ 12' 28"
6	Vicente López Carril (ESP)	Kas	+ 15' 45"
7	Francesco Moser (ITA)	Filotex	+ 20' 55"
8	Joseph Fuchs (SUI)	Filotex	+ 21' 46"
9	Edward Janssens (BEL)	Molteni	+ 30' 01"
10	Pedro Torres (ESP)	Super Ser	+ 32' 01"

== Stage 18 ==
16 July 1975 – Morzine to Châtel, 40 km (25 mi) (ITT)

Stage 18 result

Rank	Rider	Team	Time
1	Lucien Van Impe (BEL)	Gitane	1h 03' 25"
2	Ole Ritter (DEN)	Filotex	+ 56"
3	Eddy Merckx (BEL)	Molteni	+ 57"
4	Bernard Thévenet (FRA)	Peugeot–BP	+ 1' 12"
5	Joaquim Agostinho (POR)	Sporting–Sottomayor–Lejeune	+ 1' 20"
6	Felice Gimondi (ITA)	Bianchi	+ 1' 37"
7	Joop Zoetemelk (NED)	Gan–Mercier	+ 1' 41"
8	Michel Pollentier (BEL)	Flandria–Carpenter–Confortluxe	+ 2' 19"
9	Edward Janssens (BEL)	Molteni	+ 3' 00"
10	Yves Hézard (FRA)	Gan–Mercier	s.t.

General classification after stage 18

Rank	Rider	Team	Time
1	Bernard Thévenet (FRA)	Peugeot–BP	89h 38' 43"
2	Eddy Merckx (BEL)	Molteni	+ 3' 03"
3	Lucien Van Impe (BEL)	Gitane	+ 4' 49"
4	Joop Zoetemelk (NED)	Gan–Mercier	+ 6' 58"
5	Felice Gimondi (ITA)	Bianchi	+ 12' 53"
6	Vicente López Carril (ESP)	Kas	+ 19' 45"
7	Francesco Moser (ITA)	Filotex	+ 24' 59"
8	Joseph Fuchs (SUI)	Filotex	+ 25' 39"
9	Edward Janssens (BEL)	Molteni	+ 31' 49"
10	Pedro Torres (ESP)	Super Ser	+ 35' 24"

== Stage 19 ==
17 July 1975 – Thonon-les-Bains to Chalon-sur-Saône, 229 km (142 mi)

Stage 19 result

Rank	Rider	Team	Time
1	Rik Van Linden (BEL)	Bianchi	6h 53' 59"
2	Robert Mintkiewicz (FRA)	Gitane	s.t.
3	Barry Hoban (GBR)	Gan–Mercier	s.t.
4	Gerben Karstens (NED)	Gitane	s.t.
5	Walter Godefroot (BEL)	Flandria–Carpenter–Confortluxe	s.t.
6	Eddy Merckx (BEL)	Molteni	s.t.
7	Karel Rottiers (BEL)	Molteni	s.t.
8	Régis Delépine (FRA)	Flandria–Carpenter–Confortluxe	s.t.
9	Willy Teirlinck (BEL)	Gitane	s.t.
10	Gerard Vianen (NED)	Gan–Mercier	s.t.

General classification after stage 19

Rank	Rider	Team	Time
1	Bernard Thévenet (FRA)	Peugeot-BP	96h 32' 42"
2	Eddy Merckx (BEL)	Molteni	+ 3' 03"
3	Lucien Van Impe (BEL)	Gitane	+ 4' 49"
4	Joop Zoetemelk (NED)	Gan–Mercier	+ 6' 58"
5	Felice Gimondi (ITA)	Bianchi	+ 12' 53"
6	Vicente López Carril (ESP)	Kas	+ 19' 45"
7	Francesco Moser (ITA)	Filotex	+ 24' 29"
8	Joseph Fuchs (SUI)	Filotex	+ 25' 39"
9	Edward Janssens (BEL)	Molteni	+ 31' 49"
10	Pedro Torres (ESP)	Super Ser	+ 35' 24"

== Stage 20 ==
18 July 1975 – Pouilly-en-Auxois to Melun, 256 km (159 mi)

Stage 20 result

Rank	Rider	Team	Time
1	Giacinto Santambrogio (ITA)	Bianchi	7h 39' 45"
2	Rik Van Linden (BEL)	Bianchi	+ 28"
3	Gerben Karstens (NED)	Gitane	s.t.
4	Barry Hoban (GBR)	Gan–Mercier	s.t.
5	Walter Godefroot (BEL)	Flandria–Carpenter–Confortluxe	s.t.
6	Robert Mintkiewicz (FRA)	Gitane	s.t.
7	Karel Rottiers (BEL)	Molteni	s.t.
8	Régis Delépine (FRA)	Flandria–Carpenter–Confortluxe	s.t.
9	Mauro Simonetti (ITA)	Filotex	s.t.
10	José Amaro (POR)	Sporting-Sotto-Mayor-Lejeune	s.t.

General classification after stage 20

Rank	Rider	Team	Time
1	Bernard Thévenet (FRA)	Peugeot-BP	104h 12' 55"
2	Eddy Merckx (BEL)	Molteni	+ 3' 03"
3	Lucien Van Impe (BEL)	Gitane	+ 4' 49"
4	Joop Zoetemelk (NED)	Gan–Mercier	+ 6' 58"
5	Felice Gimondi (ITA)	Bianchi	+ 12' 53"
6	Vicente López Carril (ESP)	Kas	+ 19' 45"
7	Francesco Moser (ITA)	Filotex	+ 24' 29"
8	Joseph Fuchs (SUI)	Filotex	+ 25' 39"
9	Edward Janssens (BEL)	Molteni	+ 31' 49"
10	Pedro Torres (ESP)	Super Ser	+ 35' 24"

== Stage 21 ==
19 July 1975 – Melun to Senlis, 220.5 km (137.0 mi)

Stage 21 result

Rank	Rider	Team	Time
1	Rik Van Linden (BEL)	Bianchi	6h 36' 51"
2	Gerben Karstens (NED)	Gitane	s.t.
3	Barry Hoban (GBR)	Gan–Mercier	s.t.
4	Francesco Moser (ITA)	Filotex	s.t.
5	Karel Rottiers (BEL)	Molteni	s.t.
6	Gerard Vianen (NED)	Gan–Mercier	s.t.
7	Marc Demeyer (BEL)	Flandria–Carpenter–Confortluxe	s.t.
8	Robert Mintkiewicz (FRA)	Gitane	s.t.
9	Mariano Martínez (FRA)	Gitane	s.t.
10	Joaquim Agostinho (POR)	Sporting-Sotto-Mayor-Lejeune	s.t.

General classification after stage 21

Rank	Rider	Team	Time
1	Bernard Thévenet (FRA)	Peugeot-BP	110h 50' 02"
2	Eddy Merckx (BEL)	Molteni	+ 2' 47"
3	Lucien Van Impe (BEL)	Gitane	+ 5' 01"
4	Joop Zoetemelk (NED)	Gan–Mercier	+ 6' 42"
5	Felice Gimondi (ITA)	Bianchi	+ 13' 05"
6	Vicente López Carril (ESP)	Kas	+ 19' 29"
7	Francesco Moser (ITA)	Filotex	+ 24' 13"
8	Joseph Fuchs (SUI)	Filotex	+ 25' 51"
9	Edward Janssens (BEL)	Molteni	+ 32' 01"
10	Pedro Torres (ESP)	Super Ser	+ 35' 36"

== Stage 22 ==
20 July 1975 – Paris to Paris Champs-Élysées, 163.5 km (101.6 mi)

Stage 22 result

Rank	Rider	Team	Time
1	Walter Godefroot (BEL)	Flandria–Carpenter–Confortluxe	3h 45' 29"
2	Robert Mintkiewicz (FRA)	Gitane	s.t.
3	Gerben Karstens (NED)	Gitane	s.t.
4	Régis Delépine (FRA)	Flandria–Carpenter–Confortluxe	s.t.
5	Barry Hoban (GBR)	Gan–Mercier	s.t.
6	Régis Ovion (FRA)	Peugeot-BP	s.t.
7	Willy Teirlinck (BEL)	Gitane	s.t.
8	José Viejo (ESP)	Super Ser	s.t.
9	Rik Van Linden (BEL)	Bianchi	s.t.
10	Albert Van Vlierberghe (BEL)	Miko–de Gribaldy	s.t.

General classification after stage 22

Rank	Rider	Team	Time
1	Bernard Thévenet (FRA)	Peugeot-BP	114h 35' 31
2	Eddy Merckx (BEL)	Molteni	+ 2' 47"
3	Lucien Van Impe (BEL)	Gitane	+ 5' 01"
4	Joop Zoetemelk (NED)	Gan–Mercier	+ 6' 42"
5	Vicente López Carril (ESP)	Kas	+ 19' 29"
6	Felice Gimondi (ITA)	Bianchi	+ 23' 05"
7	Francesco Moser (ITA)	Filotex	+ 24' 13"
8	Joseph Fuchs (SUI)	Filotex	+ 25' 51"
9	Edward Janssens (BEL)	Molteni	+ 32' 01"
10	Pedro Torres (ESP)	Super Ser	+ 35' 36"
