= 1975 Tour de France, Prologue to Stage 10 =

Cycling race stages

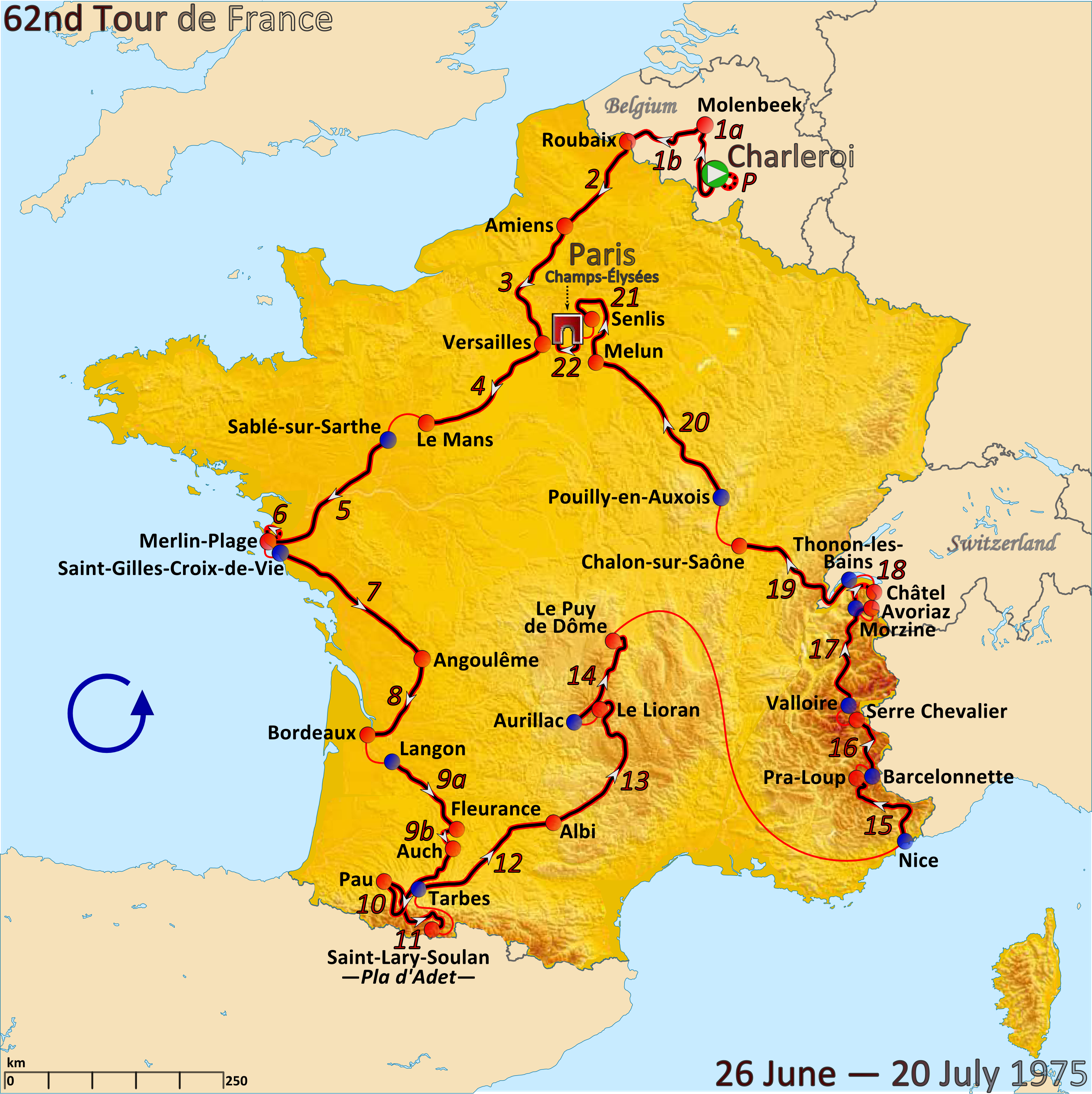
Route of the 1975 Tour de France

The 1975 Tour de France was the 62nd edition of the Tour de France, one of cycling's Grand Tours. The Tour began in Charleroi, Belgium with a prologue individual time trial on 26 June, and Stage 10 occurred on 7 July with a mountainous stage to Pau. The race finished in Paris on 20 July.

== Prologue ==
26 June 1975 – Charleroi to Charleroi, 6.25 km (3.88 mi) (ITT)

Prologue result and general classification after prologue

Rank	Rider	Team	Time
1	Francesco Moser (ITA)	Filotex	8' 49"
2	Eddy Merckx (BEL)	Molteni	+ 2"
3	Lucien Van Impe (BEL)	Gitane	+ 14"
4	Michel Pollentier (BEL)	Flandria–Carpenter–Confortluxe	s.t.
5	Yves Hézard (FRA)	Gan–Mercier	+ 15"
6	Joop Zoetemelk (NED)	Gan–Mercier	+ 17"
7	Gerben Karstens (NED)	Gitane	+ 18"
8	Knut Knudsen (NOR)	Jolly Ceramica	+ 20"
9	Régis Ovion (FRA)	Peugeot–BP	+ 22"
10	Hennie Kuiper (NED)	Frisol–GBC	+ 23"

== Stage 1a ==
27 June 1975 – Charleroi to Molenbeek, 94 km (58 mi)

Stage 1a result

Rank	Rider	Team	Time
1	Cees Priem (NED)	Frisol–GBC	2h 09' 27"
2	Eddy Merckx (BEL)	Molteni	s.t.
3	Ronald De Witte (BEL)	Flandria–Carpenter–Confortluxe	s.t.
4	Lucien Van Impe (BEL)	Gitane	s.t.
5	Joop Zoetemelk (NED)	Gan–Mercier	s.t.
6	Michel Pollentier (BEL)	Flandria–Carpenter–Confortluxe	s.t.
7	Francesco Moser (ITA)	Filotex	s.t.
8	Gerrie Knetemann (NED)	Gan–Mercier	s.t.
9	Karel Rottiers (BEL)	Molteni	+ 7"
10	Rik Van Linden (BEL)	Bianchi	+ 53"

General classification after stage 1a

Rank	Rider	Team	Time
1	Francesco Moser (ITA)	Filotex	2h 18' 16"
2	Eddy Merckx (BEL)	Molteni	+ 2"
=3	Lucien Van Impe (BEL)	Gitane	+ 14"
=3	Michel Pollentier (BEL)	Flandria–Carpenter–Confortluxe	s.t.
5	Joop Zoetemelk (NED)	Gan–Mercier	+ 17"
6	Gerrie Knetemann (NED)	Gan–Mercier	+ 24"
7	Karel Rottiers (BEL)	Molteni	+ 57"
8	Yves Hézard (FRA)	Gan–Mercier	+ 1' 08"
=9	Gerben Karstens (NED)	Gitane	+ 1' 11"
=9	Ronald De Witte (BEL)	Flandria–Carpenter–Confortluxe	+ 1' 11"

== Stage 1b ==
27 June 1975 – Molenbeek to Roubaix, 109 km (68 mi)

Stage 1b result

Rank	Rider	Team	Time
1	Rik Van Linden (BEL)	Bianchi	2h 28' 30"
2	Francesco Moser (ITA)	Filotex	s.t.
3	Walter Godefroot (BEL)	Flandria–Carpenter–Confortluxe	s.t.
4	Marc Demeyer (BEL)	Flandria–Carpenter–Confortluxe	s.t.
5	Felice Gimondi (ITA)	Bianchi	s.t.
6	Herman Van Springel (BEL)	Flandria–Carpenter–Confortluxe	s.t.
7	Eddy Merckx (BEL)	Molteni	s.t.
8	Bernard Thévenet (FRA)	Peugeot–BP	s.t.
9	Michel Pollentier (BEL)	Flandria–Carpenter–Confortluxe	s.t.
10	Giovanni Battaglin (ITA)	Jolly Ceramica	s.t.

General classification after stage 1b

Rank	Rider	Team	Time
1	Francesco Moser (ITA)	Filotex	4h 46' 46"
2	Eddy Merckx (BEL)	Molteni	+ 2"
3	Michel Pollentier (BEL)	Flandria–Carpenter–Confortluxe	+ 14"
4	Bernard Thévenet (FRA)	Peugeot–BP	+ 1' 17"
5	Herman Van Springel (BEL)	Flandria–Carpenter–Confortluxe	+ 1' 18"
=6	Giovanni Battaglin (ITA)	Jolly Ceramica	+ 1' 22"
=6	Felice Gimondi (ITA)	Bianchi	s.t.
=8	Rik Van Linden (BEL)	Bianchi	+ 1' 27"
=8	Raymond Poulidor (FRA)	Gan–Mercier	s.t.
10	Walter Godefroot (BEL)	Flandria–Carpenter–Confortluxe	+ 1' 28"

== Stage 2 ==
28 June 1975 – Roubaix to Amiens, 121 km (75 mi)

Stage 2 result

Rank	Rider	Team	Time
1	Ronald De Witte (BEL)	Flandria–Carpenter–Confortluxe	2h 37' 17"
2	Gerard Vianen (NED)	Gan–Mercier	s.t.
3	Rik Van Linden (BEL)	Bianchi	s.t.
4	Jacques Esclassan (FRA)	Peugeot–BP	s.t.
5	Wilfried Wesemael (BEL)	Miko–de Gribaldy	s.t.
6	Barry Hoban (GBR)	Gan–Mercier	s.t.
7	Karel Rottiers (BEL)	Molteni	s.t.
8	Cees Priem (NED)	Frisol–GBC	s.t.
9	Alessio Antonini (ITA)	Jolly Ceramica	s.t.
10	Gerben Karstens (NED)	Gitane	s.t.

General classification after stage 2

Rank	Rider	Team	Time
1	Francesco Moser (ITA)	Filotex	7h 24' 03"
2	Eddy Merckx (BEL)	Molteni	+ 2"
3	Michel Pollentier (BEL)	Flandria–Carpenter–Confortluxe	+ 14"
4	Bernard Thévenet (FRA)	Peugeot–BP	+ 1' 17"
5	Herman Van Springel (BEL)	Flandria–Carpenter–Confortluxe	+ 1' 18"
=6	Giovanni Battaglin (ITA)	Jolly Ceramica	+ 1' 22"
=6	Felice Gimondi (ITA)	Bianchi	s.t.
=8	Rik Van Linden (BEL)	Bianchi	+ 1' 27"
=8	Raymond Poulidor (FRA)	Gan–Mercier	s.t.
10	Walter Godefroot (BEL)	Flandria–Carpenter–Confortluxe	+ 1' 28"

== Stage 3 ==
29 June 1975 – Amiens to Versailles, 170 km (110 mi)

Stage 3 result

Rank	Rider	Team	Time
1	Karel Rottiers (BEL)	Molteni	4h 04' 04"
2	Francesco Moser (ITA)	Filotex	s.t.
3	Jacques Esclassan (FRA)	Peugeot–BP	s.t.
4	Rik Van Linden (BEL)	Bianchi	s.t.
5	Walter Godefroot (BEL)	Flandria–Carpenter–Confortluxe	s.t.
6	Eddy Merckx (BEL)	Molteni	s.t.
7	Barry Hoban (GBR)	Gan–Mercier	s.t.
8	Pierino Gavazzi (ITA)	Jolly Ceramica	s.t.
9	Robert Mintkiewicz (FRA)	Gitane	s.t.
10	Régis Delépine (FRA)	Flandria–Carpenter–Confortluxe	s.t.

General classification after stage 3

Rank	Rider	Team	Time
1	Francesco Moser (ITA)	Filotex	11h 28' 07"
2	Eddy Merckx (BEL)	Molteni	+ 2"
3	Michel Pollentier (BEL)	Flandria–Carpenter–Confortluxe	+ 14"
4	Bernard Thévenet (FRA)	Peugeot–BP	+ 1' 17"
5	Herman Van Springel (BEL)	Flandria–Carpenter–Confortluxe	+ 1' 18"
=6	Giovanni Battaglin (ITA)	Jolly Ceramica	+ 1' 22"
=6	Felice Gimondi (ITA)	Bianchi	s.t.
=8	Rik Van Linden (BEL)	Bianchi	+ 1' 27"
=8	Raymond Poulidor (FRA)	Gan–Mercier	s.t.
10	Walter Godefroot (BEL)	Flandria–Carpenter–Confortluxe	+ 1' 28"

== Stage 4 ==
30 June 1975 – Versailles to Le Mans, 223 km (139 mi)

Stage 4 result

Rank	Rider	Team	Time
1	Jacques Esclassan (FRA)	Peugeot–BP	5h 26' 32"
2	Rik Van Linden (BEL)	Bianchi	s.t.
3	Robert Mintkiewicz (FRA)	Gitane	s.t.
4	Giacomo Bazzan (ITA)	Jolly Ceramica	s.t.
5	Theo Smit (NED)	Frisol–GBC	s.t.
6	Wilfried Wesemael (BEL)	Miko–de Gribaldy	s.t.
7	Bruno Vicino (ITA)	Jolly Ceramica	s.t.
8	Pierino Gavazzi (ITA)	Jolly Ceramica	s.t.
9	Herman Van Springel (BEL)	Flandria–Carpenter–Confortluxe	s.t.
10	Giacinto Santambrogio (ITA)	Bianchi	s.t.

General classification after stage 4

Rank	Rider	Team	Time
1	Francesco Moser (ITA)	Filotex	16h 54' 39"
2	Eddy Merckx (BEL)	Molteni	+ 2"
3	Michel Pollentier (BEL)	Flandria–Carpenter–Confortluxe	+ 14"
4	Bernard Thévenet (FRA)	Peugeot–BP	+ 1' 17"
5	Herman Van Springel (BEL)	Flandria–Carpenter–Confortluxe	+ 1' 18"
=6	Giovanni Battaglin (ITA)	Jolly Ceramica	+ 1' 22"
=6	Felice Gimondi (ITA)	Bianchi	s.t.
=8	Rik Van Linden (BEL)	Bianchi	+ 1' 27"
=8	Raymond Poulidor (FRA)	Gan–Mercier	s.t.
10	Walter Godefroot (BEL)	Flandria–Carpenter–Confortluxe	+ 1' 28"

== Stage 5 ==
1 July 1975 – Sablé-sur-Sarthe to Merlin-Plage, 222 km (138 mi)

Stage 5 result

Rank	Rider	Team	Time
1	Theo Smit (NED)	Frisol–GBC	5h 39' 25"
2	Rik Van Linden (BEL)	Bianchi	s.t.
3	Eddy Merckx (BEL)	Molteni	s.t.
4	Jacques Esclassan (FRA)	Peugeot–BP	s.t.
5	Henk Prinsen (NED)	Frisol–GBC	s.t.
6	Giacinto Santambrogio (ITA)	Bianchi	s.t.
7	Pierino Gavazzi (ITA)	Jolly Ceramica	s.t.
8	Barry Hoban (GBR)	Gan–Mercier	s.t.
9	Gerben Karstens (NED)	Gitane	s.t.
10	Alessio Antonini (ITA)	Jolly Ceramica	s.t.

General classification after stage 5

Rank	Rider	Team	Time
1	Francesco Moser (ITA)	Filotex	22h 34' 04"
2	Eddy Merckx (BEL)	Molteni	+ 2"
3	Michel Pollentier (BEL)	Flandria–Carpenter–Confortluxe	+ 14"
4	Bernard Thévenet (FRA)	Peugeot–BP	+ 1' 17"
5	Herman Van Springel (BEL)	Flandria–Carpenter–Confortluxe	+ 1' 18"
=6	Giovanni Battaglin (ITA)	Jolly Ceramica	+ 1' 22"
=6	Felice Gimondi (ITA)	Bianchi	s.t.
=8	Rik Van Linden (BEL)	Bianchi	+ 1' 27"
=8	Raymond Poulidor (FRA)	Gan–Mercier	s.t.
10	Walter Godefroot (BEL)	Flandria–Carpenter–Confortluxe	+ 1' 28"

== Stage 6 ==
2 July 1975 – Merlin-Plage to Merlin-Plage, 16 km (9.9 mi) (ITT)

Stage 6 result

Rank	Rider	Team	Time
1	Eddy Merckx (BEL)	Molteni	19' 33"
2	Yves Hézard (FRA)	Gan–Mercier	+ 27"
3	Knut Knudsen (NOR)	Jolly Ceramica	+ 30"
4	Francesco Moser (ITA)	Filotex	+ 33"
5	Jean-Pierre Danguillaume (FRA)	Peugeot–BP	+ 45"
6	Bernard Thévenet (FRA)	Peugeot–BP	+ 52"
7	Luis Ocaña (ESP)	Super Ser	+ 53"
8	Hennie Kuiper (NED)	Frisol–GBC	+ 56"
9	Michel Pollentier (BEL)	Flandria–Carpenter–Confortluxe	+ 57"
10	Gerrie Knetemann (NED)	Gan–Mercier	+ 58"

General classification after stage 6

Rank	Rider	Team	Time
1	Eddy Merckx (BEL)	Molteni	22h 53' 39"
2	Francesco Moser (ITA)	Filotex	+ 31"
3	Michel Pollentier (BEL)	Flandria–Carpenter–Confortluxe	+ 1' 09"
4	Bernard Thévenet (FRA)	Peugeot–BP	+ 2' 07"
=5	Herman Van Springel (BEL)	Flandria–Carpenter–Confortluxe	+ 2' 32"
=5	Raymond Poulidor (FRA)	Gan–Mercier	s.t.
7	Felice Gimondi (ITA)	Bianchi	+ 2' 34"
8	Lucien Van Impe (BEL)	Gitane	+ 2' 50"
9	Giovanni Battaglin (ITA)	Jolly Ceramica	+ 2' 53"
10	Marc Demeyer (BEL)	Flandria–Carpenter–Confortluxe	+ 2' 54"

== Stage 7 ==
3 July 1975 – Saint-Gilles-Croix-de-Vie to Angoulême, 236 km (147 mi)

Stage 7 result

Rank	Rider	Team	Time
1	Francesco Moser (ITA)	Filotex	6h 25' 16"
2	Rik Van Linden (BEL)	Bianchi	s.t.
3	Walter Godefroot (BEL)	Flandria–Carpenter–Confortluxe	s.t.
4	Eddy Merckx (BEL)	Molteni	s.t.
5	Joop Zoetemelk (NED)	Gan–Mercier	s.t.
6	Alain Cigana (FRA)	Jobo–Sablière–Wolber	s.t.
7	Jacques Esclassan (FRA)	Peugeot–BP	s.t.
8	Alessio Antonini (ITA)	Jolly Ceramica	+ 3"
9	Jean-Pierre Danguillaume (FRA)	Peugeot–BP	s.t.
10	Willy Teirlinck (BEL)	Gitane	+ 4"

General classification after stage 7

Rank	Rider	Team	Time
1	Eddy Merckx (BEL)	Molteni	29h 18' 55"
2	Francesco Moser (ITA)	Filotex	+ 31"
3	Michel Pollentier (BEL)	Flandria–Carpenter–Confortluxe	+ 1' 13"
4	Bernard Thévenet (FRA)	Peugeot–BP	+ 2' 11"
=5	Herman Van Springel (BEL)	Flandria–Carpenter–Confortluxe	+ 2' 36"
=5	Raymond Poulidor (FRA)	Gan–Mercier	s.t.
7	Felice Gimondi (ITA)	Bianchi	+ 2' 38"
8	Lucien Van Impe (BEL)	Gitane	+ 2' 54"
9	Giovanni Battaglin (ITA)	Jolly Ceramica	+ 2' 57"
10	Marc Demeyer (BEL)	Flandria–Carpenter–Confortluxe	+ 2' 58"

== Stage 8 ==
4 July 1975 – Angoulême to Bordeaux, 134 km (83 mi)

Stage 8 result

Rank	Rider	Team	Time
1	Barry Hoban (GBR)	Gan–Mercier	3h 25' 54"
2	Rik Van Linden (BEL)	Bianchi	s.t.
3	Francesco Moser (ITA)	Filotex	s.t.
4	Walter Godefroot (BEL)	Flandria–Carpenter–Confortluxe	s.t.
5	Gerben Karstens (NED)	Gitane	s.t.
6	Giacomo Bazzan (ITA)	Jolly Ceramica	s.t.
7	Pierino Gavazzi (ITA)	Jolly Ceramica	s.t.
8	Régis Delépine (FRA)	Flandria–Carpenter–Confortluxe	s.t.
9	Marc Demeyer (BEL)	Flandria–Carpenter–Confortluxe	s.t.
10	Alain Cigana (FRA)	Jobo–Sablière–Wolber	s.t.

General classification after stage 8

Rank	Rider	Team	Time
1	Eddy Merckx (BEL)	Molteni	32h 44' 49"
2	Francesco Moser (ITA)	Filotex	+ 31"
3	Michel Pollentier (BEL)	Flandria–Carpenter–Confortluxe	+ 1' 13"
4	Bernard Thévenet (FRA)	Peugeot–BP	+ 2' 11"
=5	Herman Van Springel (BEL)	Flandria–Carpenter–Confortluxe	+ 2' 36"
=5	Raymond Poulidor (FRA)	Gan–Mercier	s.t.
7	Felice Gimondi (ITA)	Bianchi	+ 2' 38"
8	Lucien Van Impe (BEL)	Gitane	+ 2' 54"
9	Giovanni Battaglin (ITA)	Jolly Ceramica	+ 2' 57"
10	Marc Demeyer (BEL)	Flandria–Carpenter–Confortluxe	+ 2' 58"

== Stage 9a ==
5 July 1975 – Langon to Fleurance, 131 km (81 mi)

Stage 9a result

Rank	Rider	Team	Time
1	Theo Smit (NED)	Frisol–GBC	3h 15' 32"
2	Rik Van Linden (BEL)	Bianchi	s.t.
3	Giacinto Santambrogio (ITA)	Bianchi	s.t.
4	Eddy Merckx (BEL)	Molteni	s.t.
5	Gerben Karstens (NED)	Gitane	s.t.
6	Gerard Vianen (NED)	Gan–Mercier	s.t.
7	Giacomo Bazzan (ITA)	Jolly Ceramica	s.t.
8	Eddy Peelman (BEL)	Super Ser	s.t.
9	Robert Mintkiewicz (FRA)	Gitane	s.t.
10	Barry Hoban (GBR)	Gan–Mercier	s.t.

General classification after stage 9a

Rank	Rider	Team	Time
1	Eddy Merckx (BEL)	Molteni	36h 00' 21"
2	Francesco Moser (ITA)	Filotex	+ 31"
3	Michel Pollentier (BEL)	Flandria–Carpenter–Confortluxe	+ 1' 13"
4	Bernard Thévenet (FRA)	Peugeot–BP	+ 2' 11"
=5	Herman Van Springel (BEL)	Flandria–Carpenter–Confortluxe	+ 2' 36"
=5	Raymond Poulidor (FRA)	Gan–Mercier	s.t.
7	Felice Gimondi (ITA)	Bianchi	+ 2' 38"
8	Lucien Van Impe (BEL)	Gitane	+ 2' 54"
9	Giovanni Battaglin (ITA)	Jolly Ceramica	+ 2' 57"
10	Marc Demeyer (BEL)	Flandria–Carpenter–Confortluxe	+ 2' 58"

== Stage 9b ==
5 July 1975 – Fleurance to Auch, 37 km (23 mi) (ITT)

Stage 9b result

Rank	Rider	Team	Time
1	Eddy Merckx (BEL)	Molteni	49' 42"
2	Bernard Thévenet (FRA)	Peugeot–BP	+ 9"
3	Knut Knudsen (NOR)	Jolly Ceramica	+ 13"
4	Felice Gimondi (ITA)	Bianchi	+ 44"
5	Yves Hézard (FRA)	Gan–Mercier	+ 47"
6	Luis Ocaña (ESP)	Super Ser	+ 1' 06"
7	Francesco Moser (ITA)	Filotex	+ 1' 08"
8	Michel Pollentier (BEL)	Flandria–Carpenter–Confortluxe	+ 1' 16"
9	Jean-Pierre Danguillaume (FRA)	Peugeot–BP	+ 1' 20"
10	Joop Zoetemelk (NED)	Gan–Mercier	+ 1' 40"

General classification after stage 9b

Rank	Rider	Team	Time
1	Eddy Merckx (BEL)	Molteni	36h 50' 03"
2	Francesco Moser (ITA)	Filotex	+ 1' 39"
3	Bernard Thévenet (FRA)	Peugeot–BP	+ 2' 20"
4	Michel Pollentier (BEL)	Flandria–Carpenter–Confortluxe	+ 2' 29"
5	Felice Gimondi (ITA)	Bianchi	+ 3' 22"
6	Knut Knudsen (NOR)	Jolly Ceramica	+ 3' 43"
7	Yves Hézard (FRA)	Gan–Mercier	+ 3' 59"
8	Raymond Poulidor (FRA)	Gan–Mercier	+ 4' 42"
9	Herman Van Springel (BEL)	Flandria–Carpenter–Confortluxe	+ 4' 43"
10	Joop Zoetemelk (NED)	Gan–Mercier	+ 4' 48"

== Rest day 1 ==
5 July 1975 – Auch

== Stage 10 ==
7 July 1975 – Auch to Pau, 206 km (128 mi)

Stage 10 result

Rank	Rider	Team	Time
1	Felice Gimondi (ITA)	Bianchi	5h 59' 52"
2	Roberto Poggiali (ITA)	Filotex	+ 2"
3	Jean-Pierre Danguillaume (FRA)	Peugeot–BP	+ 7"
4	Bernard Thévenet (FRA)	Peugeot–BP	+ 8"
5	Francesco Moser (ITA)	Filotex	s.t.
6	Yves Hézard (FRA)	Gan–Mercier	s.t.
7	Giovanni Battaglin (ITA)	Jolly Ceramica	s.t.
8	Eddy Merckx (BEL)	Molteni	s.t.
9	Lucien Van Impe (BEL)	Gitane	s.t.
10	Raymond Poulidor (FRA)	Gan–Mercier	s.t.

General classification after stage 10

Rank	Rider	Team	Time
1	Eddy Merckx (BEL)	Molteni	42h 50' 03"
2	Francesco Moser (ITA)	Filotex	+ 1' 39"
3	Bernard Thévenet (FRA)	Peugeot–BP	+ 2' 20"
4	Felice Gimondi (ITA)	Bianchi	+ 3' 14"
5	Yves Hézard (FRA)	Gan–Mercier	+ 3' 59"
6	Raymond Poulidor (FRA)	Gan–Mercier	+ 4' 42"
7	Joop Zoetemelk (NED)	Gan–Mercier	+ 4' 48"
8	Jean-Pierre Danguillaume (FRA)	Peugeot–BP	+ 4' 50"
9	Luis Ocaña (ESP)	Super Ser	+ 5' 14"
10	Giovanni Battaglin (ITA)	Jolly Ceramica	+ 5' 17"
