= Corbeau (surname) =

Corbeau is a French language surname from the French word for raven. Notable people with the name include:

- André Corbeau (1950), French racing cyclist
- Bert Corbeau (1894–1942), Canadian ice hockey player
- Caspar Corbeau (2001), Dutch American swimmer
- Con Corbeau (1885–1920), Canadian ice hockey player
- Peter Corbeau, fictional character appearing in American comic books published by Marvel Comics
