= Intermediate sprints classification in the Tour de France =

Secondary competition in the Tour de France from 1966-89

Red jersey
- Sport: Road bicycle racing
- Competition: Tour de France
- Awarded for: Intermediate sprints winner
- Local name: Maillot rouge (French)

History
- First award: 1966
- Editions: 24
- Final award: 1989
- First winner: Pieter Nassen (BEL)
- Most wins: Sean Kelly (IRL) 3 times
- Most recent: Sean Kelly (IRL)

The intermediate sprints classification, also known as the points chauds classification (French for "hot points"), was a secondary competition in the Tour de France that was contested between 1966 and 1989. From 1984 onwards, the leader was indicated by the red jersey.

== History ==
The classification began in 1966. Because the non-finish sprints also awarded points for the points classification, the intermediate sprints classification was considered redundant and removed from the Tour in 1989.

== Point distribution ==
		1	2	3	4	5
1986-1989	1st half (Note: 1986: stage 1-12 1987: stage 1-12 1988: stage 1-10 1989: stage 1-8)	6	4	2		
1986-1989	2nd half (Note: 1986: stage 13-25 1987: stage 13-25 1988: stage 11-22 1989: stage 9-20)	15	10	5		
1985	stages 1-5	3	2	1		
1985	stages 6-11	6	4	2		
1985	stages 12-17	9	6	3		
1985	stages 18-22	12	8	4		
1981-1984	all stages	8	5	3		
1980	all stages	5	3	2		
1968, 1971-1979	all stages	6	4	3	2	1
1970	all stages	5	4	3	2	1
1966-1967	all stages	3	2	1		

== Intermediate sprints classification results ==
Intermediate sprints classification podiums by year
Year	First place		Second place		Third place		Ref
Year	Rider	Points	Rider	Points	Rider	Points	Ref
1966	Guido Neri (ITA)	19	André Darrigade (FRA)	12	Georges Vandenberghe (BEL)	10	
1967	Georges Vandenberghe (BEL)	20	Christian Raymond (FRA)	16	Roger Milliot (FRA)	13	
1968	Georges Vandenberghe (BEL)	59	Michael Wright (GBR)	45	Barry Hoban (GBR)	43	
1969	Eric Leman (BEL)	53	Michael Wright (GBR)	46	Raymond Riotte (FRA)	43	
1970	Cyrille Guimard (FRA)	67	Giancarlo Polidori (ITA)	48	Jaak De Boever (BEL)	22	
1971	Pieter Nassen (BEL)	52	Jos van der Vleuten (NED)	35	Eddy Merckx (BEL)	34	
1972	Willy Teirlinck (BEL)	61	Robert Mintkiewicz (FRA)	48	Barry Hoban (GBR)	38	
1973	Marc Demeyer (BEL)	105	Barry Hoban (GBR)	70	Willy Teirlinck (BEL)	60	
1974	Barry Hoban (GBR)	132	Gerben Karstens (NED)	110	Eddy Merckx (BEL)	92	
1975	Marc Demeyer (BEL)	77	Barry Hoban (GBR)	47	Robert Mintkiewicz (FRA)	35	
1976	Robert Mintkiewicz (FRA)	54	Freddy Maertens (BEL)	37	Marcello Osler (ITA)	24	
1977	Pierre-Raymond Villemiane (FRA)	73	Giacinto Santambrogio (ITA)	49	Jacques Esclassan (FRA)	32	
1978	Jacques Bossis (FRA)	95	Philippe Tesnière (FRA)	60	Pierre-Raymond Villemiane (FRA)	52	
1979	Willy Teirlinck (BEL)	92	Pierre-Raymond Villemiane (FRA)	83	Bernard Hinault (FRA)	52	
1980	Rudy Pevenage (BEL)	79	Jean-Louis Gauthier (FRA)	45	Ludo Peeters (BEL)	31	
1981	Freddy Maertens (BEL)	131	William Tackaert (BEL)	106	Bernard Hinault (FRA)	61	
1982	Sean Kelly (IRL)	187	Phil Anderson (AUS)	87	Daniel Willems (BEL)	80	
1983	Sean Kelly (IRL)	151	Pierre Le Bigaut (FRA)	77	Laurent Fignon (FRA)	54	
1984	Jacques Hanegraaf (NED)	155	Bernard Hinault (FRA)	52	Laurent Fignon (FRA)	51	
1985	Jozef Lieckens (BEL)	162	Eduardo Chozas (ESP)	67	Sean Kelly (IRL)	59	
1986	Gerrit Solleveld (NED)	305	Dirk De Wolf (BEL)	170	Dominique Arnaud (FRA)	145	
1987	Gilbert Duclos-Lassalle (FRA)	249	Jean-Paul van Poppel (NED)	178	Régis Clère (FRA)	142	
1988	Frans Maassen (NED)	276	Eddy Planckaert (BEL)	214	Johnny Weltz (DEN)	64	
1989	Sean Kelly (IRL)	131	Steven Rooks (NED)	80	Valerio Tebaldi (ITA)	80	

== Sponsorship ==
1984-1989: Catch

1980-1983: Talbot

1977-1979: Simca

1966-1976: Miko
