= Joaquim Carvalho =

Joaquim Carvalho may refer to:

- Joaquim Carvalho (field hockey)
- Joaquim Carvalho (footballer)
- Joaquim Carvalho (cyclist)
