= Manuel Silva (cyclist) =

Portuguese cyclist

Personal information
- Born: 5 January 1954 (age 72)

Cycling career
- Sport: Cycling
- Role: Rider

Manuel Silva (born 5 January 1954) is a Portuguese racing cyclist. He rode in the 1975 Tour de France.
