= Pietro Dallai =

Italian cyclist

Personal information
- Born: 3 April 1947 (age 79) Borgo San Lorenzo

Cycling career
- Sport: Cycling
- Role: Rider

Pietro Dallai (born 3 April 1947) is an Italian racing cyclist. He rode in the 1975 Tour de France.
