= Claude Magni =

French cyclist (born 1950)

Personal information
- Born: 11 September 1950 (age 76) Saint-Maixant, Gironde, France

Cycling career
- Sport: Cycling

Claude Magni (born 11 September 1950) is a former French cyclist. He competed in the team time trial at the 1972 Summer Olympics.
