= Jacques Boulas =

French cyclist

Personal information
- Full name: Jacques Boulas
- Born: 20 October 1948 Étampes, France
- Died: 29 September 1990 (aged 41) Chartres, France

Cycling career
- Sport: Cycling
- Role: Rider

Jacques Boulas (20 October 1948 – 29 September 1990) was a French racing cyclist. He finished in last place in the 1975 Tour de France.
