= Guy Leleu =

French cyclist (1950–2026)

Personal information
- Born: 4 February 1950 Surques, France
- Died: 26 April 2026 (aged 76)

Cycling career
- Sport: Cycling
- Role: Rider

Guy Leleu (4 February 1950 – 26 April 2026) was a French racing cyclist. He rode in the 1975 Tour de France. Leleu died on 26 April 2026, at the age of 76.
