= Renato Marchetti =

Italian cyclist

Personal information
- Born: 22 April 1947 (age 79)

Cycling career
- Sport: Cycling
- Role: Rider

Renato Marchetti (born 22 April 1947) is an Italian racing cyclist. He rode in the 1975 Tour de France.
