= Saint-Maixant, Gironde =

Saint-Maixant
- Commune
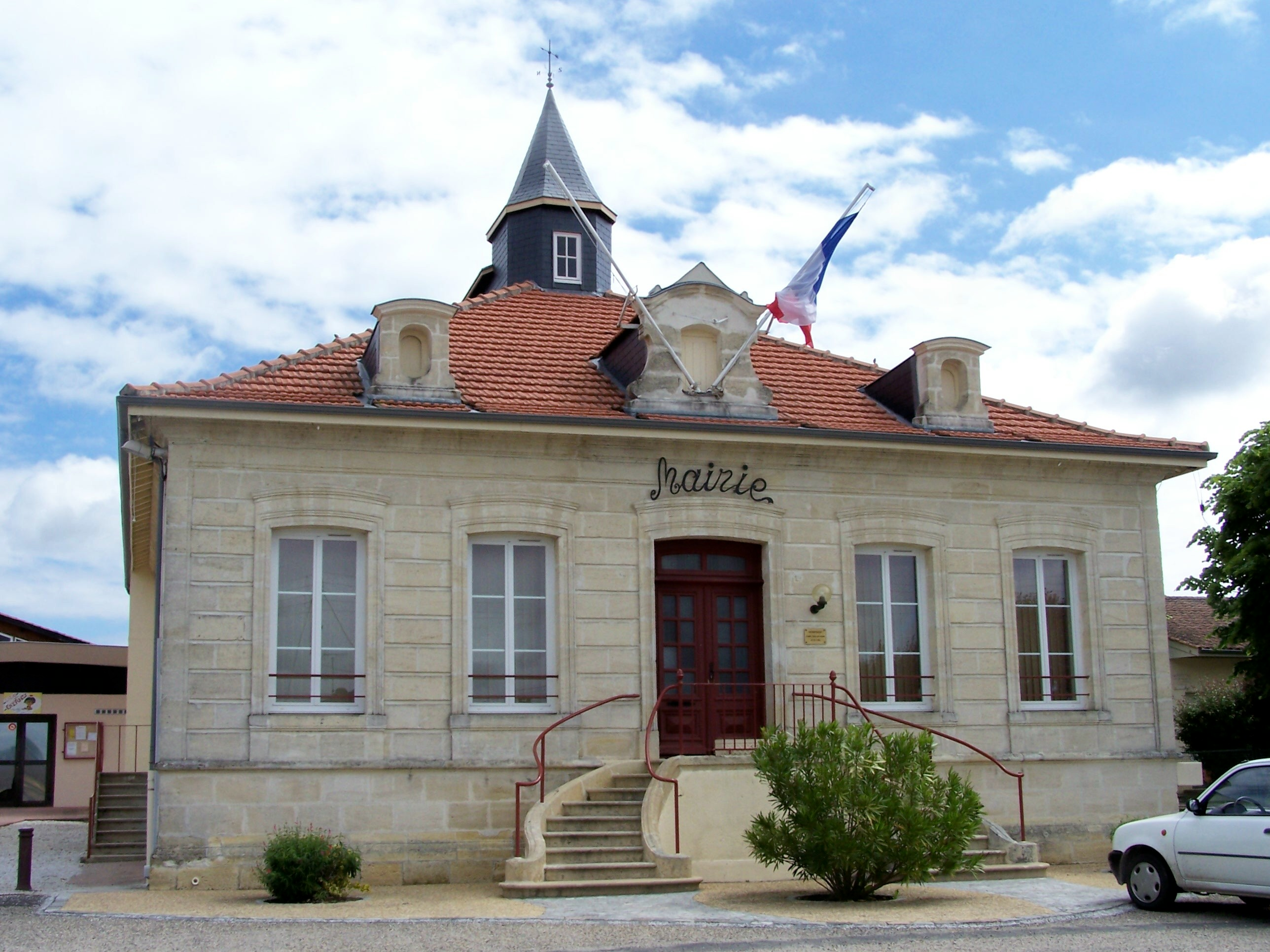
- Town hall

- Coat of arms
- Location of Saint-Maixant
- Location within France Location within Nouvelle-Aquitaine
- Coordinates: 44°34′47″N 0°15′35″W
- Country: France
- Region: Nouvelle-Aquitaine
- Department: Gironde
- Arrondissement: Langon
- Canton: L'Entre-Deux-Mers

Government
  - Mayor (2020–2026): Alain Bernardet
- Area^{1}: 7.68 km^{2} (2.97 sq mi)
- Elevation: 20 m (66 ft)
- Highest elevation: 98 m (322 ft)
- Lowest elevation: 0 m (0 ft)
- Population (2023): 2,057
  - Density: 268/km^{2} (694/sq mi)
- Time zone: UTC+01:00 (CET)
  - Summer (DST): UTC+02:00 (CEST)
- INSEE/Postal code: 33438 /33490
- ^{1} French Land Register data, which excludes lakes, ponds, glaciers > 1 km^{2} (0.386 sq mi or 247 acres) and river estuaries.

Saint-Maixant (French pronunciation: [sɛ̃ mɛksɑ̃]; Occitan: Sent Maxenç) is a commune in the Gironde department in Nouvelle-Aquitaine in southwestern France.

== Population ==
Historical population
Year	Pop.	±% p.a.
1968	925	—
1975	1,018	+1.38%
1982	1,203	+2.41%
1990	1,349	+1.44%
1999	1,277	−0.61%
2007	1,382	+0.99%
2012	1,691	+4.12%
2017	1,919	+2.56%
2023	2,057	+1.16%
Source: INSEE

== See also ==
- Communes of the Gironde department
