= Joaquim Carvalho (cyclist) =

Portuguese cyclist

Personal information
- Born: 13 August 1953 (age 73)

Cycling career
- Sport: Cycling
- Role: Rider

Joaquim Carvalho (born 13 August 1953) is a Portuguese racing cyclist. He rode in the 1975 Tour de France.
