= Richard Pianaro =

French cyclist

Personal information
- Born: 1 September 1949 (age 77)

Cycling career
- Sport: Cycling
- Role: Rider

Richard Pianaro (born 1 September 1949) is a French racing cyclist. He rode in the 1975 Tour de France.
