= André Romero =

French cyclist

Personal information
- Born: September 19, 1950 (age 76) Granada

Cycling career
- Sport: Cycling
- Current team: Retired
- Discipline: Road
- Role: Rider

Professional teams
- 1973: Bic
- 1974-1976: Jobo
- 1977: Frisol
- 1978: Jobo

Andrew Romero (born 19 September 1950 in Granada) is a former French cyclist.

== Palmares ==
1975
9th overall Critérium du Dauphiné Libéré
1976
6th overall Tour de Suisse

== Results on the grand tours ==
=== Tour de France ===
- 1974: 15th
- 1975: 12th
- 1976: 39th
- 1977: DNF (2nd stage)
- 1978: 15th

=== Vuelta a España ===
- 1977: 29th
