= Fernando Ferreira (cyclist) =

Portuguese cyclist

Personal information
- Born: 22 January 1952 (age 74)

Cycling career
- Sport: Cycling
- Role: Rider

Fernando Ferreira (born 22 January 1952) is a Portuguese racing cyclist. He rode in the 1975 Tour de France.
