= Theo Smit =

Dutch cyclist (1951–2023)

Personal information
- Born: 5 April 1951 Amsterdam, Netherlands
- Died: 20 July 2023 (aged 72) Zwanenburg, Netherlands

Cycling career
- Sport: Cycling
- Disciplines: Road, track
- Role: Rider
- Rider type: Sprinter

Theo Smit (5 April 1951 – 20 July 2023) was a Dutch professional road bicycle racer.

Smit died on 20 July 2023, at the age of 72.

== Major results ==
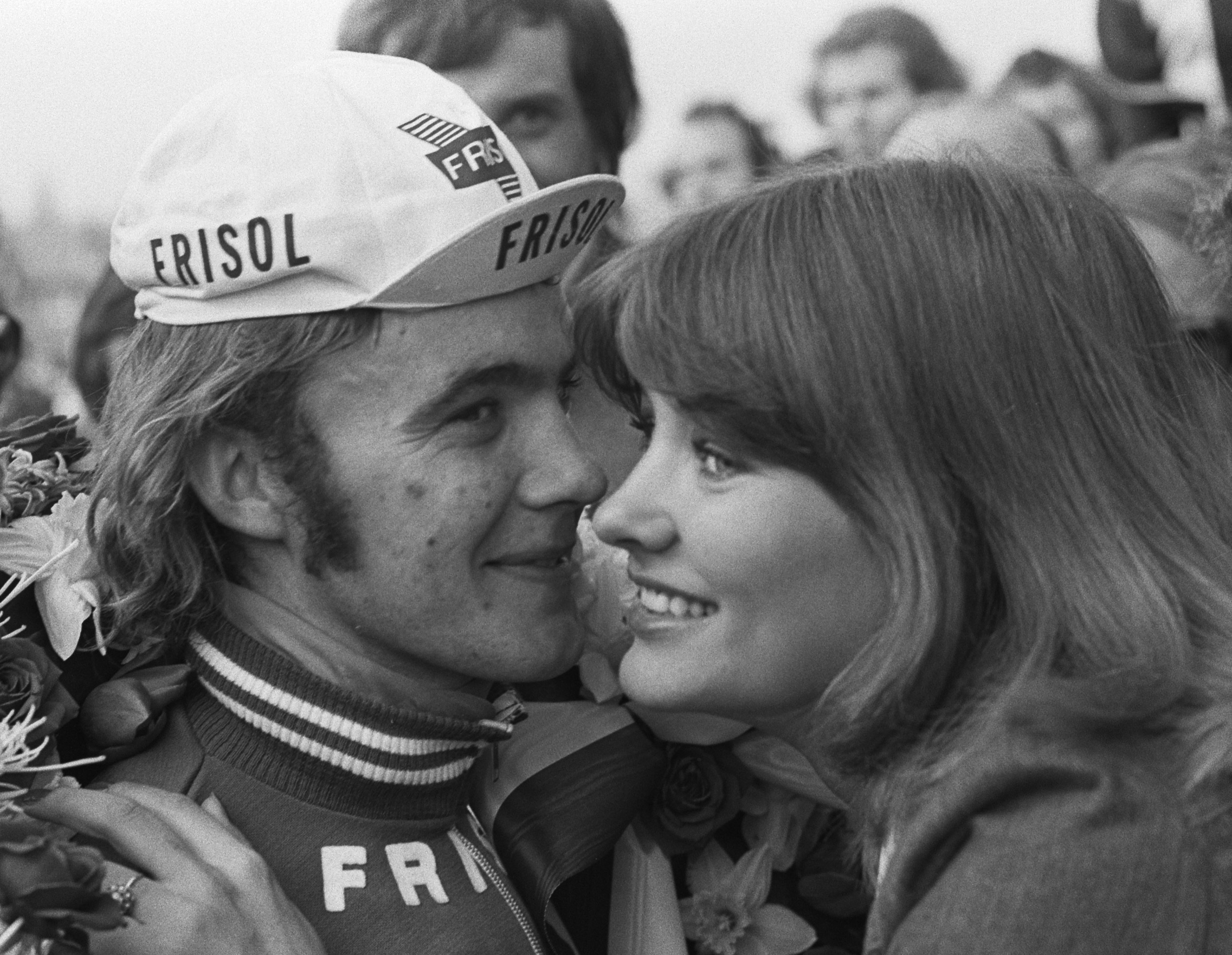
Anke Groot (Miss Europe 1973) congratulates Smit with winning the Ronde van Noord-Holland 1974

1974
Ronde van Noord-Holland
1975
Belsele
Tour de France:

Winner stages 5 and 9A

1976
Netherlands National 50 km Track Championship
Vuelta a España:

Winner stages 3 and 5

1977
Aalsmeer
Obbicht
1978
Vlissingen
1980
Alkmaar
Netherlands National Sprint Track Championship
Alphen aan de Rijn
Rijen
1981
Bodegraven
IJsselstein
Limbrecht
1982
Zes van Rijn & Gouwe
Profronde van Stiphout
Ede
Dongen
1983
Aalsmeer

Netherlands National Team Time Trial Championship D

Profronde van Wierden
Ulvenhout
Waddinxveen
Kampen
1984
Kamerik
Netherlands National Track Points race Championship
Ronde van Gouda
Zes van Rijn & Gouwe
1985
Langedijk
Netherlands National Track Keirin Championship
1986
Profronde van Surhuisterveen
Kampen
