= Ferdinand Julien =

French cyclist

Personal information
- Born: 30 June 1946 (age 80) Rosières, France

Cycling career
- Sport: Cycling
- Role: Rider

Ferdinand Julien (born 30 June 1946) is a former French racing cyclist. He rode in eight editions of the Tour de France between 1973 and 1980.
