= Edward Janssens =

Belgian cyclist

Personal information
- Born: 18 January 1946 (age 80) Londerzeel, Belgium

Cycling career
- Sport: Cycling
- Current team: Retired
- Discipline: Road
- Role: Rider

Professional teams
- 1969–1970: Mercier–BP–Hutchinson
- 1971: Flandria–Mars
- 1972: Van Cauter–Magniflex–de Gribaldy
- 1973–1976: Molteni
- 1977: Fiat France
- 1978: C&A
- 1979: Flandria–Ça va seul

Edward Janssens (born 18 January 1946) is a Belgian former racing cyclist. He rode in seven editions of the Tour de France, as well as three of the Giro d'Italia, and the Vuelta a España.

== Major results ==
1971
1st GP Briek Schotte
2nd Grote Prijs Stad Zottegem
3rd Grote Prijs Jef Scherens
3rd GP Flandria
7th Ronde van Brabant
1972
5th Overall Tour of Belgium
1973
1st Stage 4 Tour of Belgium
1975
1st Leeuwse Pijl
8th Overall Tour de Suisse
9th Overall Tour de France
