= José Amaro (cyclist) =

Portuguese cyclist

Personal information
- Born: 13 January 1954
- Died: 7 May 1987 (aged 33)

Cycling career
- Sport: Cycling
- Role: Rider

José Amaro (13 January 1954 – 7 May 1987) was a Portuguese racing cyclist. He rode in the 1975 Tour de France.
