= André Corbeau =

French cyclist

Personal information
- Born: 1 April 1950 (age 76) Colombiers-du-Plessis, France

Cycling career
- Sport: Cycling
- Role: Rider

André Corbeau (born 1 April 1950) is a French former professional racing cyclist. He rode in two editions of the Tour de France.
