= Gerard Kamper =

Dutch cyclist (1950–2026)

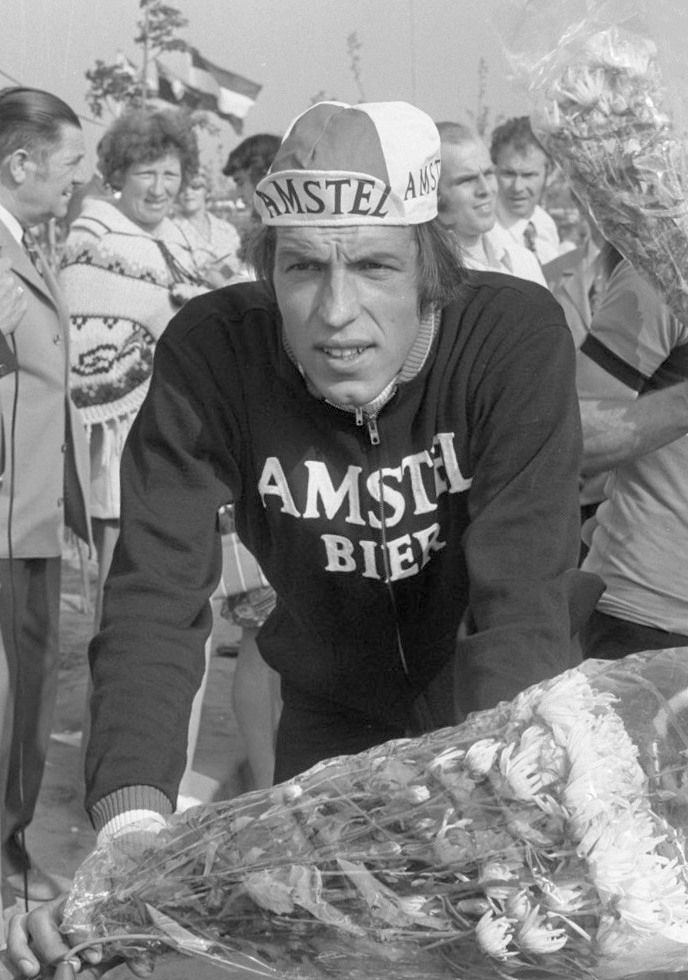
- Kamper in 1972

Personal information
- Born: 9 August 1950 Koedijk, Netherlands
- Died: 29 March 2026 (aged 75) Warmenhuizen, Netherlands
- Height: 1.86 m (6 ft 1 in)
- Weight: 76 kg (168 lb)

Sport
- Sport: Cycling

Gerardus "Gerard" Kamper (9 August 1950 – 29 March 2026) was a Dutch cyclist. He was part of the Dutch team that shared fifth place in the 4 km team pursuit at the 1972 Summer Olympics. He finished 84th in the 1975 Tour de France. His son Kris also became a professional cyclist.

Kamper died on 29 March 2026, at the age of 75.

== See also ==
- List of Dutch Olympic cyclists
