= Jean-Claude Misac =

French cyclist

Personal information
- Born: 27 October 1948
- Died: 10 September 1975 (aged 26)

Cycling career
- Sport: Cycling
- Role: Rider

Jean-Claude Misac (27 October 1948 – 10 September 1975) was a French racing cyclist. He rode in the 1974 Tour de France.
