= Luigi Castelletti =

Italian cyclist

Personal information
- Born: 6 July 1948 (age 78)

Cycling career
- Sport: Cycling
- Role: Rider

Luigi Castelletti (born 6 July 1948) is an Italian racing cyclist. He rode in the 1972 Tour de France. In 1968 he won Coppa Città di San Daniele.
