= Marc Lievens =

Belgian cyclist

Personal information
- Born: 16 July 1948 (age 78)

Cycling career
- Sport: Cycling
- Role: Rider

Marc Lievens (born 16 July 1948) is a Belgian racing cyclist. He rode in the 1970 Tour de France.
