= Alain Cigana =

French cyclist

Personal information
- Born: 10 December 1950 (age 75) La Réole, France

Cycling career
- Sport: Cycling
- Role: Rider

Alain Cigana (born 10 December 1950) is a French former professional racing cyclist. He rode in three editions of the Tour de France.
