= Joël Hauvieux =

French cyclist

Personal information
- Born: 20 January 1949 (age 77) Brette-les-Pins, France

Cycling career
- Sport: Cycling
- Role: Rider

Joël Hauvieux (born 20 January 1949) is a French former professional racing cyclist. He rode in two editions of the Tour de France. He finished the 1976 edition in 70th place and was given the Combativity award after stage 4. His sporting career began with La Hutte-Gitane.
