= Henk Prinsen =

Dutch cyclist

Personal information
- Born: 25 December 1951 (age 74)

Cycling career
- Sport: Cycling
- Role: Rider

Henk Prinsen (born 25 December 1951) is a Dutch racing cyclist. He rode in the 1974 Tour de France.

His brother Wim Prinsen and cousin Ad Prinsen were also road cyclists.
