= André Doyen =

Belgian cyclist

Personal information
- Born: 29 March 1949 (age 77)

Cycling career
- Sport: Cycling
- Role: Rider

André Doyen (born 29 March 1949) is a Belgian racing cyclist. He rode in the 1973 Tour de France.
