= Karel Rottiers =

Belgian cyclist (1953–2024)

- Rottiers in 1978

Personal information
- Full name: Karel Rottiers
- Born: 7 April 1953 Bornem, Belgium
- Died: 2 July 2024 (aged 71)

Cycling career
- Sport: Cycling
- Discipline: Road
- Role: Rider

Professional teams
- 1973–1976: Molteni
- 1977: Fiat France
- 1978: Zoppas–Zeus
- 1979: IJsboerke–Warncke Eis

Major wins
- Grand Tours Tour de France 1 individual stage (1975)

Karel Rottiers (7 April 1953 – 2 July 2024) was a Belgian professional road bicycle racer. He was born in Bornem on 7 April 1953. Rottiers won the third stage of the 1975 Tour de France. Rottiers died on 2 July 2024, at the age of 71.

== Major results ==
1969
1st Road race, National Novice Road Championships
1972
6th Kampioenschap van Vlaanderen
1973
3rd Circuit des Frontières
4th Overall Giro Ciclistico d'Italia
4th Ronde van Vlaanderen U23
8th Kampioenschap van Vlaanderen
1974
6th Grand Prix de Wallonie
1975
1st Stage 3 Tour de France
