= Régis Delépine =

French cyclist (born 1946)

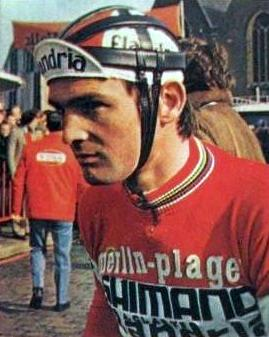
- Delépine in 1974

Personal information
- Full name: Régis Delépine
- Born: December 22, 1946 (age 79) La Bohalle, France

Cycling career
- Sport: Cycling
- Current team: Retired
- Discipline: Road
- Role: Rider

Professional teams
- 1970: Frimatic–de Gribaldy
- 1971–1973: Fagor–Mercier–Hutchinson
- 1974: Merlin Plage–Shimano–Flandria
- 1975: Carpenter–Confortluxe–Flandria
- 1976: Gan–Mercier–Hutchinson
- 1977–1980: Peugeot–Esso–Michelin

Major wins
- 1 stage 1977 Tour de France; Paris–Bourges (1977); Bordeaux–Paris (1974)

Régis Delépine (born 22 December 1946 in La Bohalle) is a French former professional road bicycle racer. In the 1974 edition of Bordeaux–Paris, he was ranked first together with Herman Van Springel, after Van Springel went the wrong way in the final.

== Major results ==
1969
1st Paris–Rouen
1st Stage 7 Tour de l'Avenir
2nd Paris–Roubaix Espoirs
1970
1st Stages 2b, 6a, 7 & 8b Volta a Portugal
1972
1st Stage 5b Critérium du Dauphiné Libéré
1973
1st Paris–Camembert
1st Stage 1 Tour d'Indre-et-Loire
5th GP Ouest France-Plouay
9th Paris–Roubaix
1974
1st Bordeaux–Paris (together with Herman Van Springel)
1st Stage 3 Tour d'Indre-et-Loire
3rd Maël-Pestivien
4th GP Ouest France-Plouay
1975
1st Circuit de l'Indre
2nd Bordeaux–Paris
6th GP Ouest France-Plouay
1976
1st Stages 2 & 4 Circuit Cycliste Sarthe
1st Stage 4 Tour Méditerranéen
1977
1st Paris–Bourges
1st Stage 4 Tour de France
1978
3rd Bordeaux–Paris
3rd Grand Prix de Plumelec-Morbihan
1979
1st GP de Peymeinade
2nd Bordeaux–Paris
2nd GP du Tournaisis
6th GP de la Ville de Rennes
1980
1st Circuit de l'Indre
1st Stage 1 Tour de l'Oise
4th Bordeaux–Paris
