= Robert Mintkiewicz =

French cyclist

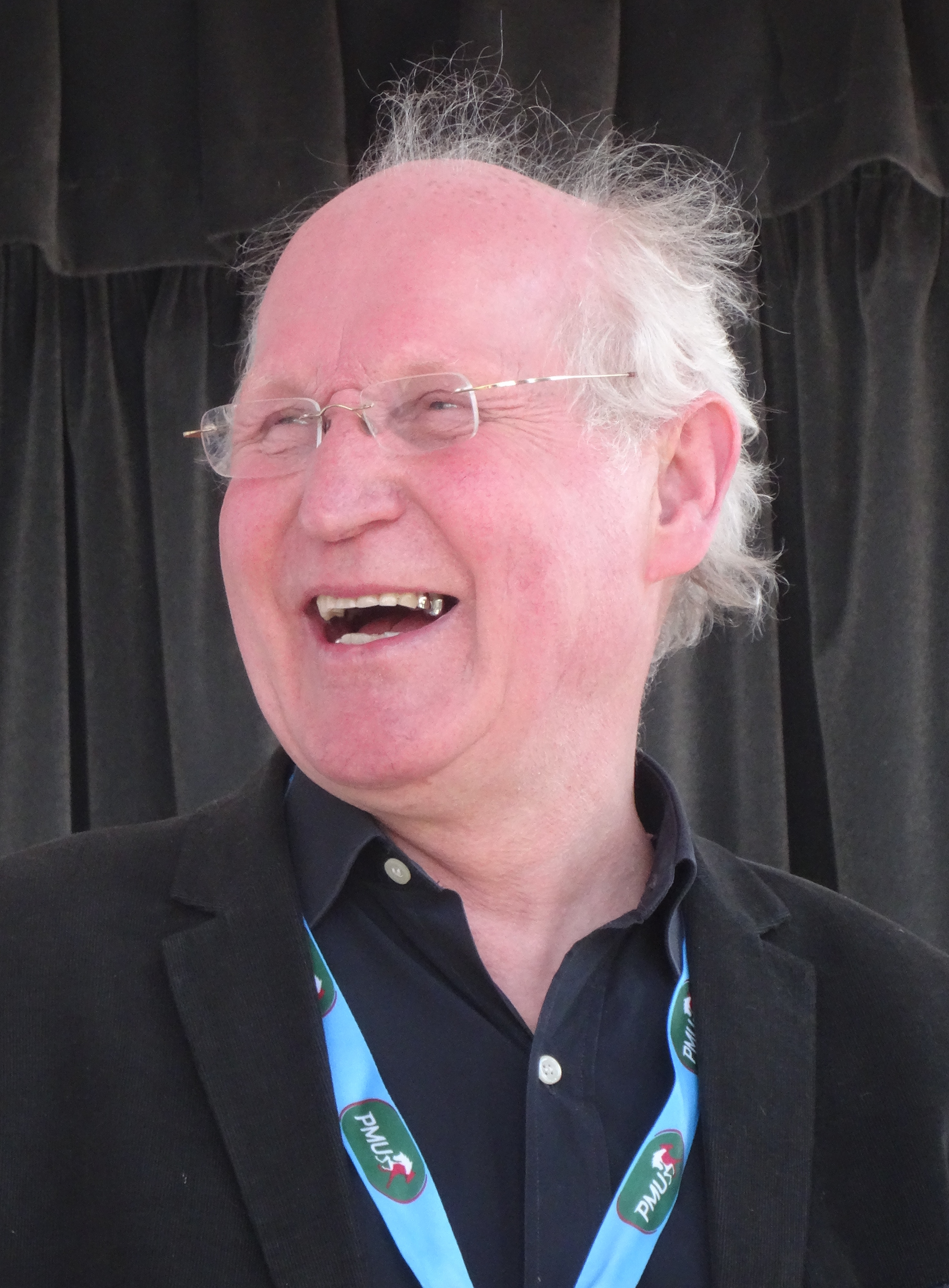
- Robert Mintkiewicz in 2014

Personal information
- Born: 14 October 1947 (age 79) Douchy-les-Mines, France

Cycling career
- Sport: Cycling
- Role: Rider

Robert Mintkiewicz (born 14 October 1947) is a French former professional racing cyclist. He rode in seven editions of the Tour de France.
