= Jobo (cycling team) =

French professional cycling team

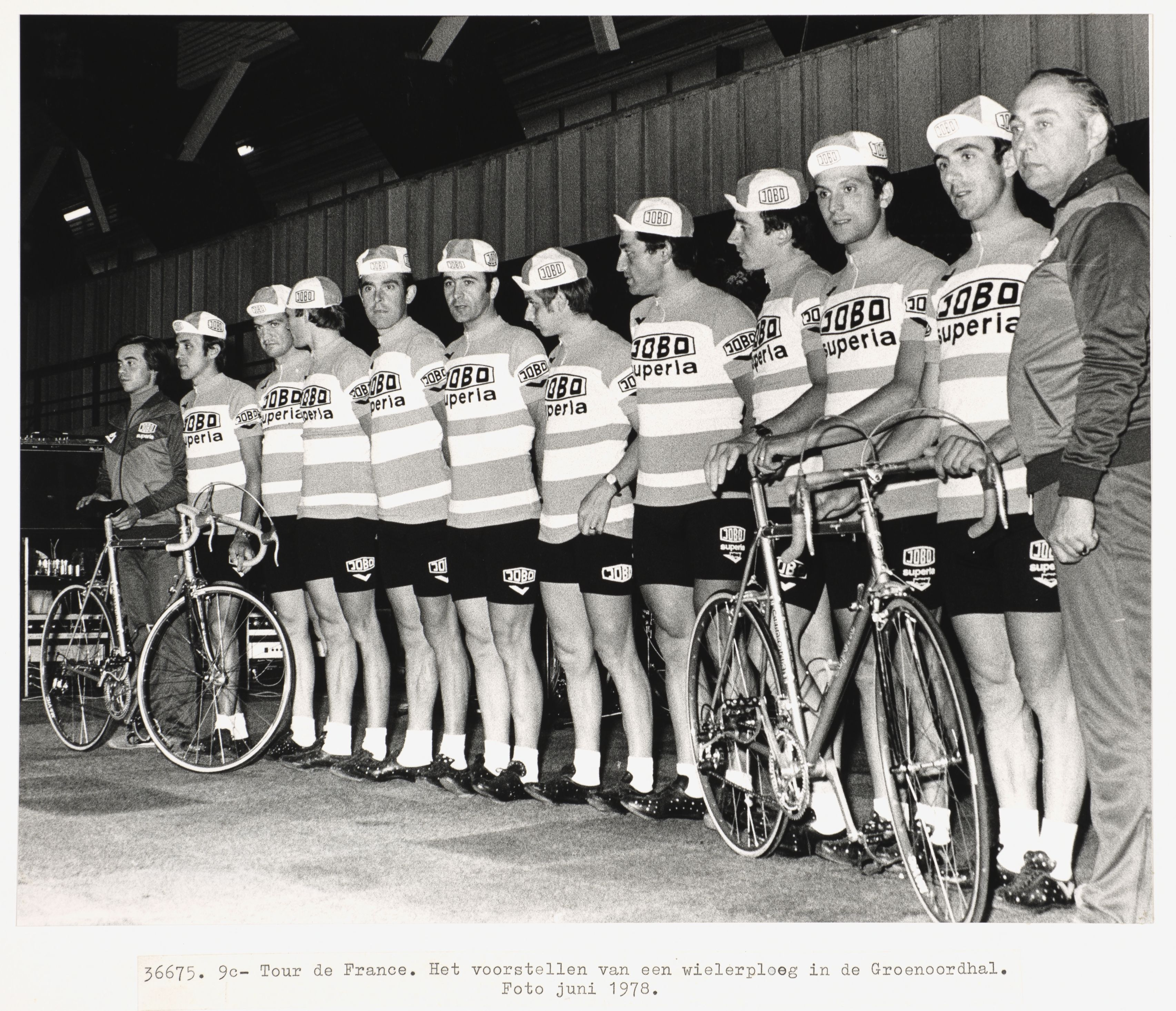
- Jobo cycling team (1978)

Team information
- Registered: France
- Founded: 1974
- Disbanded: 1978
- Discipline: Road

Team name history
- 1974 1975 1976 1978: Jobo–Lejeune; Jobo–Wolber–Sablière; Jobo–Spidel–Wolber–La France; Jobo–Spidel–La Roue d'Or

Jobo was a French professional cycling team that existed from 1974 to 1978, with the exception of 1977. A notable result was the mountains classification of the 1978 Tour de France with Mariano Martínez.
