= Ventura Díaz =

Spanish cyclist (born 1937)

Personal information
- Born: 26 August 1937 (age 89) Santander, Spain
- Height: 1.71 m (5 ft 7 in)
- Weight: 72 kg (159 lb)

Cycling career
- Sport: Cycling
- Discipline: Road
- Role: Rider

Professional teams
- 1961–1963: Ferrys
- 1964: Inuri
- 1964: Licor 43
- 1965: Olsa
- 1966–1968: Ferrys
- 1969: Karpy
- 1970–1972: Werner
- 1973–1975: Monteverde
- 1976: Teka

Ventura Díaz (born 26 August 1937) is a Spanish former road cyclist, who competed professionally from 1961 to 1976. He competed in the individual road race at the 1960 Summer Olympics. He also rode in thirteen editions of the Vuelta a España, finishing 9th in 1974, as well as two of the Tour de France and one Giro d'Italia. His biggest wins were the 1970 Vuelta a los Valles Mineros and the 1970 Vuelta a la Comunidad Valenciana.

== Major results ==
1961
1st Stage 9 Volta a Catalunya
2nd Subida a Arrate
1962
1st Stage 3 Vuelta a la Comunidad Valenciana
1963
1st Stage 1a (TTT) Vuelta a la Comunidad Valenciana
3rd GP Ayutamiento de Bilbao
9th Overall Eibarko Bizikleta
1964
1st Stage 8 Tour de l'Avenir
1965
2nd Team time trial, UCI World Road Championships
2nd Subida al Naranco
1966
2nd Overall Vuelta a La Rioja
7th Overall Eibarko Bizikleta
1967
2nd Subida a Arrate
10th Overall Setmana Catalana de Ciclisme
1968
3rd National Hill Climb Championships
1969
3rd Subida a Urkiola
1970
1st Overall Vuelta a los Valles Mineros

1st Stage 2a

1st Overall Vuelta a la Comunidad Valenciana
1st Stage 3 Grand Prix du Midi Libre
5th Overall Setmana Catalana de Ciclisme
7th Overall Volta a Catalunya
7th Overall Tour of the Basque Country
9th Overall Vuelta a Andalucía
1971
10th Overall Vuelta a Andalucía
1972
4th Overall Tour of the Basque Country
8th Overall Critérium du Dauphiné Libéré
1973
1st Stage 3 Vuelta a La Rioja
1st Stage 2 Vuelta a Segovia
3rd Klasika Primavera
7th Overall Tour of the Basque Country
7th Overall Vuelta a Andalucía
8th Overall Setmana Catalana de Ciclisme
10th Subida a Arrate
1974
1st Stage 4b Vuelta a Cantabria
3rd Overall Vuelta a los Valles Mineros
3rd National Cyclo-cross Championships
6th Overall Volta a Catalunya
9th Overall Vuelta a España
1975
1st Stage 5a Tour of the Basque Country
2nd GP Vizcaya
3rd GP Llodio
