= Roque Moya =

Spanish cyclist

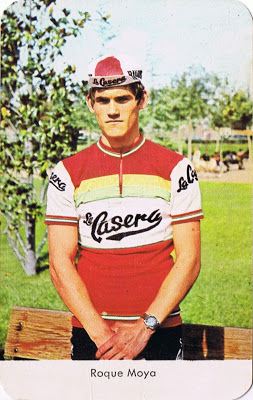

Personal information
- Born: 10 February 1953 (age 73) Gorafe, Spain

Cycling career
- Sport: Cycling
- Current team: Retired
- Discipline: Road
- Role: Rider

Professional teams
- 1976–1977: Novostil–Transmallorca
- 1978: Transmallorca–Flavia
- 1979: Novostil–Helios
- 1980: Henninger–Aquila Rossa

Major wins
- Vuelta a Aragón (1979)

Roque Moya (born 10 February 1953 in Gorafe) is a Spanish former professional cyclist.

== Major results ==
1976
1st Stage 4 Vuelta a Asturias
1978
1st Stage 4 Tour of the Basque Country
1979
1st Overall Vuelta a Aragón
1st Stage 2 Costa del Azahar
1980
1st Stage 1b Vuelta a Cantabria
4th Trofeo Masferrer
