= 1971 Volta a Catalunya =

Race details
- Dates: 14–19 September 1971
- Stages: 5 + Prologue
- Distance: 1,034.5 km (642.8 mi)
- Winning time: 28h 07' 29"

Results
	Winner	Luis Ocaña (ESP)	(Bic)
	Second	Bernard Labourdette (FRA)	(Bic)
	Third	Domingo Perurena (ESP)	(Kas–Kaskol)
	Points	Domingo Perurena (ESP)	(Kas–Kaskol)
	Mountains	Santiago Lazcano (ESP)	(Kas–Kaskol)
	Sprints	Domingo Perurena (ESP)	(Kas–Kaskol)
	Team	Salvarani	

The 1971 Volta a Catalunya was the 51st edition of the Volta a Catalunya cycle race and was held from 14 to 19 September 1971. The race started in Calafell and finished in Badalona. The race was won by Luis Ocaña of the Bic team.

== General classification ==
Final general classification

Rank	Rider	Team	Time
1	Luis Ocaña (ESP)	Bic	28h 07' 29"
2	Bernard Labourdette (FRA)	Bic	+ 20"
3	Domingo Perurena (ESP)	Kas–Kaskol	+ 37"
4	Antoon Houbrechts (BEL)	Salvarani	+ 58"
5	Felice Gimondi (ITA)	Salvarani	+ 1' 01"
6	Agustín Tamames (ESP)	Werner	+ 1' 04"
7	Miguel María Lasa (ESP)	Kas–Kaskol	+ 1' 56"
8	Franco Bitossi (ITA)	Filotex	+ 2' 25"
9	Santiago Lazcano (ESP)	Kas–Kaskol	+ 2' 34"
10	Enrique Sahagún (ESP)	La Casera–Peña Bahamontes	+ 2' 41"
