= 1974 Tour of the Basque Country =

Race details
- Dates: 1–5 April 1974
- Stages: 5
- Distance: 888 km (551.8 mi)
- Winning time: 26h 46' 36"

Results
	Winner	Miguel María Lasa (ESP)	(Kas–Kaskol)
	Second	Jesús Manzaneque (ESP)	(Kas–Kaskol)
	Third	Luis Ocaña (ESP)	(Bic)

The 1974 Tour of the Basque Country was the 14th edition of the Tour of the Basque Country cycle race and was held from 1 April to 5 April 1974. The race started in Ordizia and finished in San Sebastián. The race was won by Miguel María Lasa of the Kas team.

== General classification ==
Final general classification

Rank	Rider	Team	Time
1	Miguel María Lasa (ESP)	Kas–Kaskol	26h 46' 36"
2	Jesús Manzaneque (ESP)	Kas–Kaskol	+ 18"
3	Luis Ocaña (ESP)	Bic	+ 47"
4	Domingo Perurena (ESP)	Kas–Kaskol	+ 1' 12"
5	Andrés Oliva (ESP)	La Casera	+ 1' 41"
6	Agustín Tamames (ESP)	Monteverde	+ 2' 01"
7	Pedro Torres (ESP)	La Casera	+ 2' 20"
8	José Manuel Fuente (ESP)	Kas–Kaskol	+ 2' 21"
9	José Antonio González Linares (ESP)	Kas–Kaskol	+ 2' 44"
10	José Luis Abilleira (ESP)	La Casera	+ 2' 44"
