= 1973 Tour of the Basque Country =

Race details
- Dates: 9–13 April 1973
- Stages: 5
- Distance: 639 km (397.1 mi)
- Winning time: 17h 46' 21"

Results
	Winner	Luis Ocaña (ESP)	(Bic)
	Second	José Antonio González Linares (ESP)	(Kas–Kaskol)
	Third	Domingo Perurena (ESP)	(Kas–Kaskol)

The 1973 Tour of the Basque Country was the 13th edition of the Tour of the Basque Country cycle race and was held from 9 April to 13 April 1973. The race started and finished in Eibar. The race was won by Luis Ocaña of the Bic team.

== General classification ==
Final general classification

Rank	Rider	Team	Time
1	Luis Ocaña (ESP)	Bic	17h 46' 21"
2	José Antonio González Linares (ESP)	Kas–Kaskol	+ 40"
3	Domingo Perurena (ESP)	Kas–Kaskol	+ 1' 43"
4	José Pesarrodona (ESP)	Kas–Kaskol	+ 3' 38"
5	Jesús Manzaneque (ESP)	La Casera	+ 4' 21"
6	Juan Zurano (ESP)	La Casera	+ 4' 50"
7	Ventura Díaz (ESP)	Monteverde	+ 5' 16"
8	Julián Cuevas (ESP)	La Casera	+ 5' 55"
9	José Luis Uribezubia (ESP)	Kas–Kaskol	+ 6' 22"
10	Gonzalo Aja (ESP)	Kas–Kaskol	+ 6' 26"
