= Bernard Labourdette =

French cyclist (1946–2022)

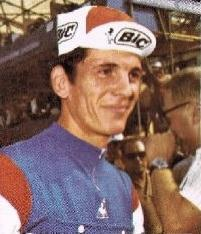
- Labourdette in 1972

Personal information
- Born: 13 August 1946 Lurbe-Saint-Christau, France
- Died: 20 July 2022 (aged 75) Lurbe-Saint-Christau, France

Cycling career
- Sport: Cycling
- Discipline: Road
- Role: Rider

Professional teams
- 1969–1970: Mercier–BP–Hutchinson
- 1971–1974: Bic
- 1975: Sporting CP
- 1976: Jobo–Spidel–Wolber–La France
- 1977: F.F.C.

Major wins
- Grand Tours Tour de France 1 individual stage (1971)

Bernard Labourdette (13 August 1946 – 20 July 2022) was a French professional road bicycle racer, who won stage 16A in the 1971 Tour de France.

== Major results ==
1970
1st Stage 2b Vuelta a La Rioja
3rd Overall Volta a Catalunya
1971
1st Stage 3 Critérium du Dauphiné Libéré
2nd Overall Volta a Catalunya
2nd Nice-Seillans
4th Overall Tour of the Basque Country

1st Stage 3

8th Overall Tour de France

1st Stage 16A

1972
1st Overall Étoile des Espoirs
1973
2nd Grand Prix d'Aix-en-Provence
10th Overall Vuelta a España
1974
10th Overall Setmana Catalana de Ciclisme
1975
2nd Overall Tour Méditerranéen
10th GP Monaco
1976
2nd Overall Étoile de Bessèges
5th Overall Tour de l'Aude
8th Overall Grand Prix du Midi Libre

=== Grand Tour general classification results timeline ===
Grand Tour	1969	1970	1971	1972	1973	1974	1975	1976
Giro d'Italia	—	—	—	—	—	—	—	—
Tour de France	25	33	8	DNF	21	20	DNF	41
Vuelta a España	—	DNF	17	10	14	—	—	—
