= Miguel María Lasa =

Spanish cyclist (born 1947)

Personal information
- Full name: Miguel María Lasa Urquía
- Born: 4 November 1947 (age 78) Oiartzun, Spain

Cycling career
- Sport: Cycling
- Discipline: Road
- Role: Rider

Professional teams
- 1969: Pepsi-Cola
- 1970: La Casera–Peña Bahamontes
- 1971: Orbea–Oar–Legnano
- 1971–1975: Kas–Kaskol
- 1976: Scic
- 1977–1978: Teka
- 1979–1980: Moliner–Vereco

Major wins
- Grand Tours Tour de France 2 individual stages (1976, 1978) Giro d'Italia 3 individual stages (1970, 1972, 1981) Vuelta a España Points classification (1975) 6 individual stages (1972, 1975, 1979, 1981) Stage races Tour of the Basque Country (1974)

Miguel María Lasa Urquía (born 4 November 1947) is a Spanish former road bicycle racer. He was born in Oiartzun. He won four stages in the Vuelta a España as well as the Points classification in 1975 Vuelta a España. He also finished on the podium of Vuelta a España four times (1972, 1974, 1975, 1977). He also won two stages in the Tour de France and three stages in the Giro d'Italia.

He also competed in the individual road race and the team time trial events at the 1968 Summer Olympics.

== Major results ==
1969
1st Prueba Villafranca de Ordizia
4th Overall Tour de l'Avenir
6th Overall Setmana Catalana de Ciclisme
1970
Volta a la Comunitat Valenciana

1st Stages 1 & 7

2nd Overall Vuelta a los Valles Mineros

1st Stage 1

4th Overall Volta a Catalunya

1st Stage 5

7th Overall Vuelta a España
8th Overall Giro d'Italia

1st Stage 12

1971
1st Overall Vuelta a Mallorca

1st Stage 1

1st GP Navarra
1st Stage 1 Vuelta a Asturias
3rd Overall Tour of the Basque Country

1st Stages 1, 2, & 4a

4th Road race, National Road Championships
6th Trofeo Masferrer
7th Overall Volta a Catalunya
1972
1st Setmana Catalana de Ciclisme

1st Stages 1a & 4

2nd Overall Vuelta a España

1st Stages 1 & 14

1st Stage 11 Giro d'Italia
2nd GP Navarra
4th Trofeo Masferrer
5th Overall Paris–Nice
5th Giro dell'Emilia
7th Overall Vuelta a Andalucía
7th Grand Prix des Nations
1973
1st Overall Vuelta a Mallorca

1st Prologue

1st Klasika Primavera
2nd Genoa–Nice
3rd Overall Vuelta a Cantabria
3rd Giro dell'Emilia
5th Milano–Torino
6th Giro di Lombardia
7th Overall Volta a Catalunya
9th Paris-Bruxelles
1974
1st Overall Tour of the Basque Country

1st Stage 5

1st GP Navarra
1st Clásica de Sabiñánigo
1st Stage 2 Volta a Catalunya
1st Stage 5 Vuelta a Asturias
2nd Overall Vuelta a Mallorca

1st Stage 1a

2nd Prueba Villafranca de Ordizia
2nd GP Pascuas
3rd Overall Vuelta a España
4th Overall Critérium du Dauphiné Libéré
4th Overall Setmana Catalana de Ciclisme
6th Giro dell'Emilia
7th Overall Vuelta a Andalucía
7th Trofeo Masferrer
9th Overall Paris–Nice
9th La Flèche Wallonne
1975
1st Overall Vuelta a Asturias

1st Stages 2, 5 & 6a

1st GP Pascuas
3rd Overall Vuelta a España

1st Points classification
1st Stages 2 & 7 (ITT)

3rd Genoa–Nice
4th Trofeo Masferrer
5th Klasika Primavera
6th Overall Tour of the Basque Country
6th Overall Escalada a Montjuïc
9th Overall Giro d'Italia
1976
1st Stage 5b Tour de France
2nd Overall Giro di Puglia
2nd Road race, National Road Championships
3rd Prueba Villafranca de Ordizia
4th Giro del Lazio
5th Overall Tour of the Basque Country
6th Coppa Ugo Agostoni
9th Giro di Toscana
1977
1st Stage 4 Tour of the Basque Country
1st Stage 3 Vuelta a Asturias
2nd Overall Vuelta a España
4th GP Navarra
4th Prueba Villafranca de Ordizia
5th Overall Vuelta a Cantabria
6th Clásica de Sabiñánigo
7th Overall Setmana Catalana de Ciclisme

1st Stage 3

7th Overall Escalada a Montjuïc
8th Road race, National Road Championships
8th GP Pascuas
1978
1st GP Navarra
1st Prueba Villafranca de Ordizia
1st Trofeo Masferrer
1st Stage 9 Tour de France
2nd Overall Setmana Catalana de Ciclisme

1st Stage 2

3rd Klasika Primavera
6th Overall Volta a Catalunya

1st Stage 2

6th Road race, National Road Championships
8th Overall Tour of the Basque Country
1979
1st Klasika Primavera
1st Stage 18a Vuelta a España
1st Stage 1 Vuelta a Asturias
2nd Road race, National Road Championships
2nd GP Navarra
3rd GP Pascuas
3rd Overall Tour of the Basque Country

1st Stage 3

4th Overall Volta a la Comunitat Valenciana

1st Stage 3

6th Overall Vuelta a Andalucía
1980
2nd Overall Tour of the Basque Country
2nd Road race, National Road Championships
3rd GP Pascuas
3rd GP Navarra
9th Overall Vuelta a España
1981
1st Stage 18 Giro d'Italia
2nd GP Navarra
9th Road race, National Road Championships
10th Overall Vuelta a España

1st Stage 17

=== Grand Tour general classification results timeline ===
Grand Tour	1969	1970	1971	1972	1973	1974	1975	1976	1977	1978	1979	1980	1981
Vuelta a España	21	7	4	2	—	3	3	—	2	—	11	9	10
Giro d'Italia	—	8	—	9	—	—	9	28	19	DNF	—	18	37
Tour de France	—	—	—	—	—	17	—	34	—	41	—	—	—

Legend
—	Did not compete
DNF	Did not finish
