= Luis Ocaña =

Spanish cyclist (1945–1994)

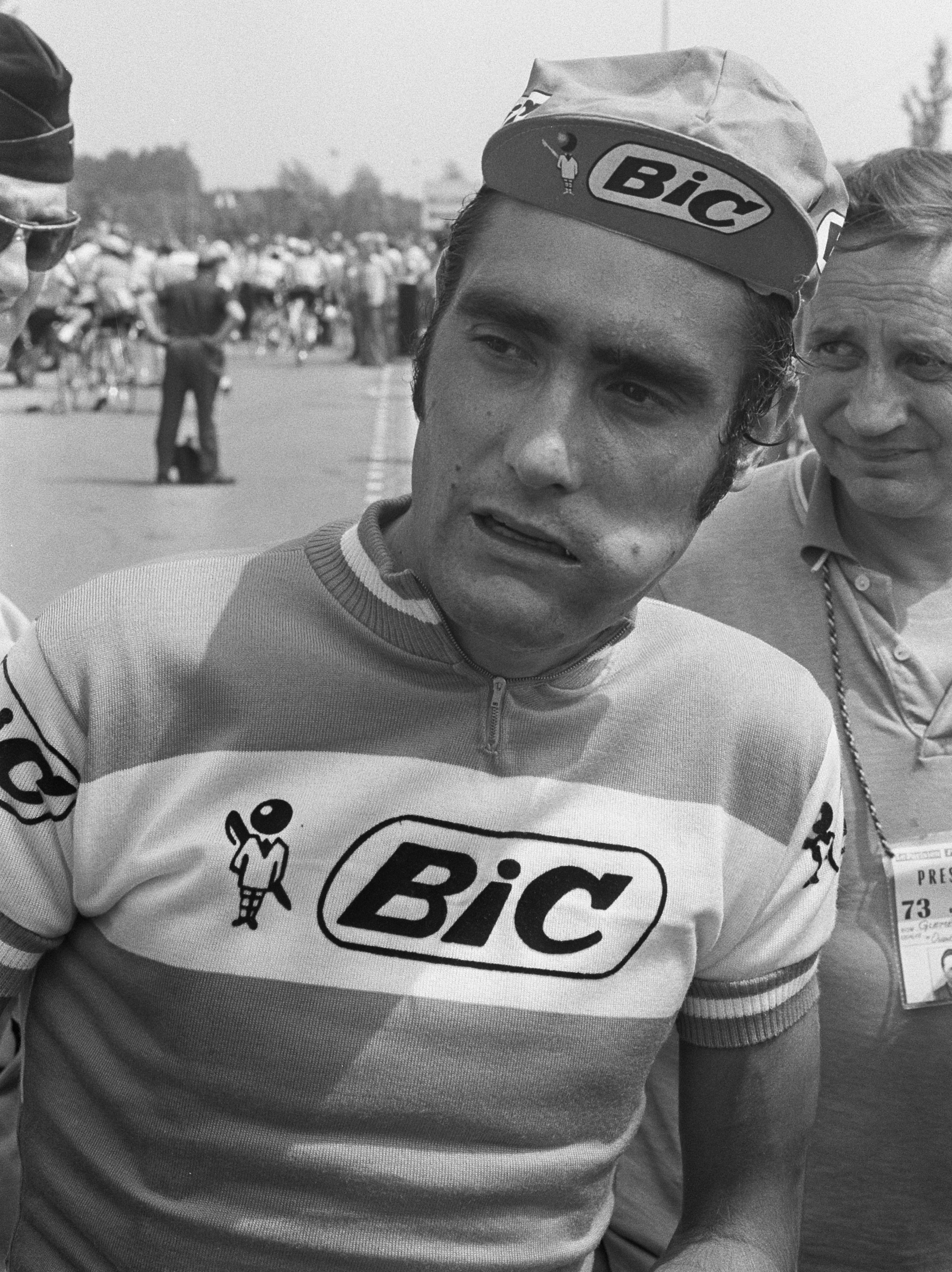
- Ocaña at the 1973 Tour de France

Personal information
- Full name: Jesús Luis Ocaña Pernía
- Born: 9 June 1945 Priego, Spain
- Died: 19 May 1994 (aged 48) Nogaro, France
- Height: 1.78 m (5 ft 10 in)

Cycling career
- Sport: Cycling
- Discipline: Road
- Role: Rider
- Rider type: Climber

Amateur team
- 1966–1967: Mercier–BP–Hutchinson

Professional teams
- 1968–1969: Fagor–Fargas
- 1970–1974: Bic
- 1975–1976: Super Ser
- 1977: Frisol–Thirion–Gazelle

Managerial teams
- 1984: Teka
- 1985: Fagor
- 1987: AD Renting–Fangio–IOC–MBK
- 1989–1990: Puertas Mavisa–Galli

Major wins
- Grand Tours Tour de France General classification (1973) 9 individual stages (1970, 1971, 1973) Vuelta a España General classification (1970) Mountains classification (1969) 6 individual stages (1969, 1970, 1971) Stage races Critérium du Dauphiné Libéré (1970, 1972, 1973) Tour of the Basque Country (1971, 1973) One-day races and Classics National Road Race Championship (1968, 1972)
Medal record
Representing Spain
Men's road bicycle racing
World Championships
Bronze medal – third place	1973 Barcelona	Road race

Jesús Luis Ocaña Pernía (pronounced [xeˈsus ˈlwis oˈkaɲa peɾˈnia]; 9 June 1945 – 19 May 1994) was a Spanish road bicycle racer who won the 1973 Tour de France and the 1970 Vuelta a España. During the 1971 Tour de France he launched an amazing solo breakaway that put him into the Yellow Jersey and stunned the rest of the main field, including Tour champion Eddy Merckx, but he abandoned in the fourteenth stage after a crash on the descent of the Col de Menté. Ocaña would abandon many Tours, but he finished every Vuelta a España he entered except for his first, and finished in the top 5 seven times in a row.

== Career ==
=== Early years ===
Ocaña was born in Priego, Cuenca, Spain but his family moved to Mont-de-Marsan (Landes, France) in 1957. Ocaña took up racing with a club in Mont-de-Marsan and began his professional career in 1968 with the Spanish Fagor team, becoming Spanish champion that year. The following year he won the prologue and two time trials, the mountains classification as well as finishing second in the Vuelta a España.

In 1969, he won the Catalan Cycling Week.

In 1970, Ocaña signed with the French team Bic. In the 1970 Vuelta a España, he battled with Agustín Tamames, losing the leader's jersey to him on the 13th stage. Ocaña performed well in the time-trial on the final day putting himself back into the Gold jersey as he won his first Grand Tour with an advantage of 1:18 over Tamames. The Spanish newspaper Dicen said Ocaña was "the best time-trialist that Spanish cycling has ever had". In the 1970 Tour de France, Ocaña won the stage to Puy-de-Dôme and finished 31st in the Tour.

=== 1971 Tour de France ===
Before the Tour de France, Ocaña finished third behind Eddy Merckx in Paris–Nice and second behind Merckx in the Critérium du Dauphiné Libéré. On the uphill finish of stage eight with four kilometres to go, Ocaña launched the decisive move and broke away from the favourites for that year's Tour, which included Merckx. He succeeded in a 15-second gain on Merckx but built on that the following day. Then on stage 11 to Orcières-Merlette, Ocaña rode himself into the yellow jersey with eight minutes over Merckx.

After a rest day, Merckx cut that lead to 7 minutes and in the Pyrenees, on the Col de Menté, Merckx attacked as he descended the mountain. Merckx lost control and skidded into a low wall. Ocaña could not avoid Merckx and fell himself. Merckx was up quickly and sped away. Ocaña struggled to release his cleats from the toe clips and was struck by the pursuing Joop Zoetemelk. The leader of the general classification lay on the ground screaming with pain. He was taken by helicopter to the hospital in Saint-Gaudens. He recovered but his 1971 Tour dreams had come to an end. The following day Merckx refused to wear the yellow jersey, in tribute to Ocaña. There is a memorial at the scene of the accident on the western side of the Col de Menté in the Pyrenees (at 42°54′55.9″N 0°44′37.7″E).

The following year, 1972, Merckx had intended on not participating in the 1972 Tour de France in order to ride the Vuelta a España for the first time, but due to critics saying that Merckx only won the Tour because of Ocaña's fall, Merckx decided to ride. There was speculation of a duel. Ocaña had won the Critérium du Dauphiné Libéré and the national championship. In the Pyrenees, Ocaña repeatedly attacked Merckx without success, before withdrawing with bronchitis.

In 1973, Merckx decided to ride the Vuelta a España and Giro d'Italia. It was the first time that Merckx contested the Vuelta a España and that year he would not be contesting the Tour de France. Ocaña battled Merckx in the race with Bernard Thévenet also present. In the end Ocaña finished second, almost 4 minutes behind Merckx.

=== 1973 Winner of the Tour de France ===
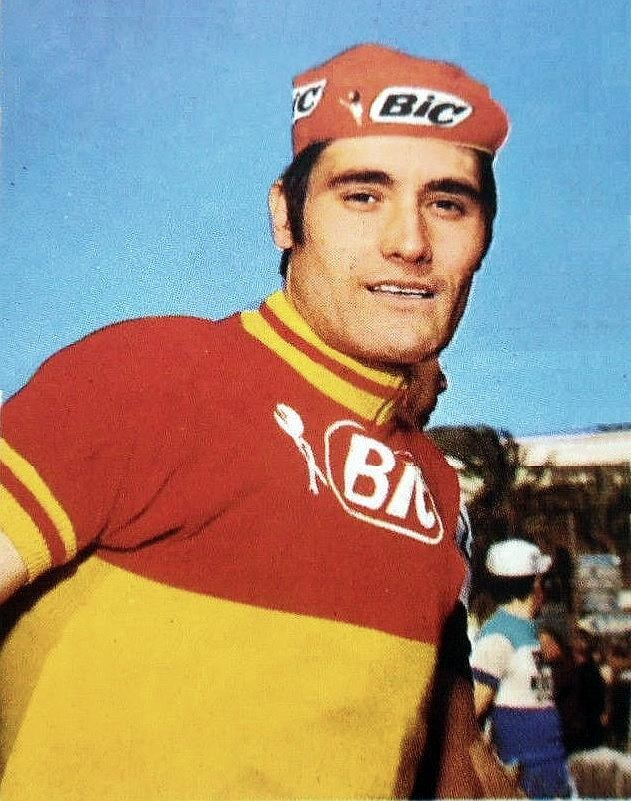
Ocaña in 1973.

Because Ocaña had only finished one of the four previous editions of the Tour de France that he had started, he was not considered a favourite for overall victory. Merckx, who was not competing, had picked José Manuel Fuente, Joop Zoetemelk and Raymond Poulidor for the podium. Indeed, Zoetemelk and Poulidor had finished first and second after the prologue while Ocaña crashed during the first stage when a dog ran into the peloton. However, on the third stage, Ocaña and his team distanced his rivals. The stage began in Roubaix and when the peloton went over cobblestones at Querenaing, Ocaña and four teammates together with six others, attacked, and gained five minutes at one point, although the chasing group reduced this to two and a half minutes at the finish. However, Fuente finished seven minutes back.

Ocaña won the first mountain stage and took the yellow jersey, while Thévenet won the second mountain stage. L'Equipe newspaper predicted a duel. However, on the third mountain stage, Ocaña delivered a crushing defeat to his rivals. Fuente attacked early on the Col du Télégraphe and a group of favourites was established. On the following climb of the Col du Galibier, Ocaña led. After the descent, Ocaña and Fuente had a minute on Thévenet, while the next group were five minutes and 30 seconds behind. Fuente suffered a flat tire and Ocaña won by 52 seconds over Fuente, almost seven minutes over Thévenet & Martinez, and 20 minutes & 24 seconds over Zoetemelk, Van Impe and Poulidor. Ocaña then led the general classification by nine minutes over Fuente, ten minutes on Thevénet, with Zoetemelk fifth, over 23 minutes behind. Ocaña then won the stage 12 time trial. A duel in the Pyrenees was expected between Ocaña and Fuente but Ocaña won the longest stage in the Pyrenees. L'Equipe had the headline Ocaña appuie sur l'accélérateur translated as Ocaña steps on the accelerator. Ocaña won the last individual time trial and also the mountain stage to Puy-de-Dôme, eventually winning the race with 15 minutes over Bernard Thévenet. He also won the combativity award. After his win, Ocaña declared that after the 1974 Tour de France, he wanted to try the hour record.

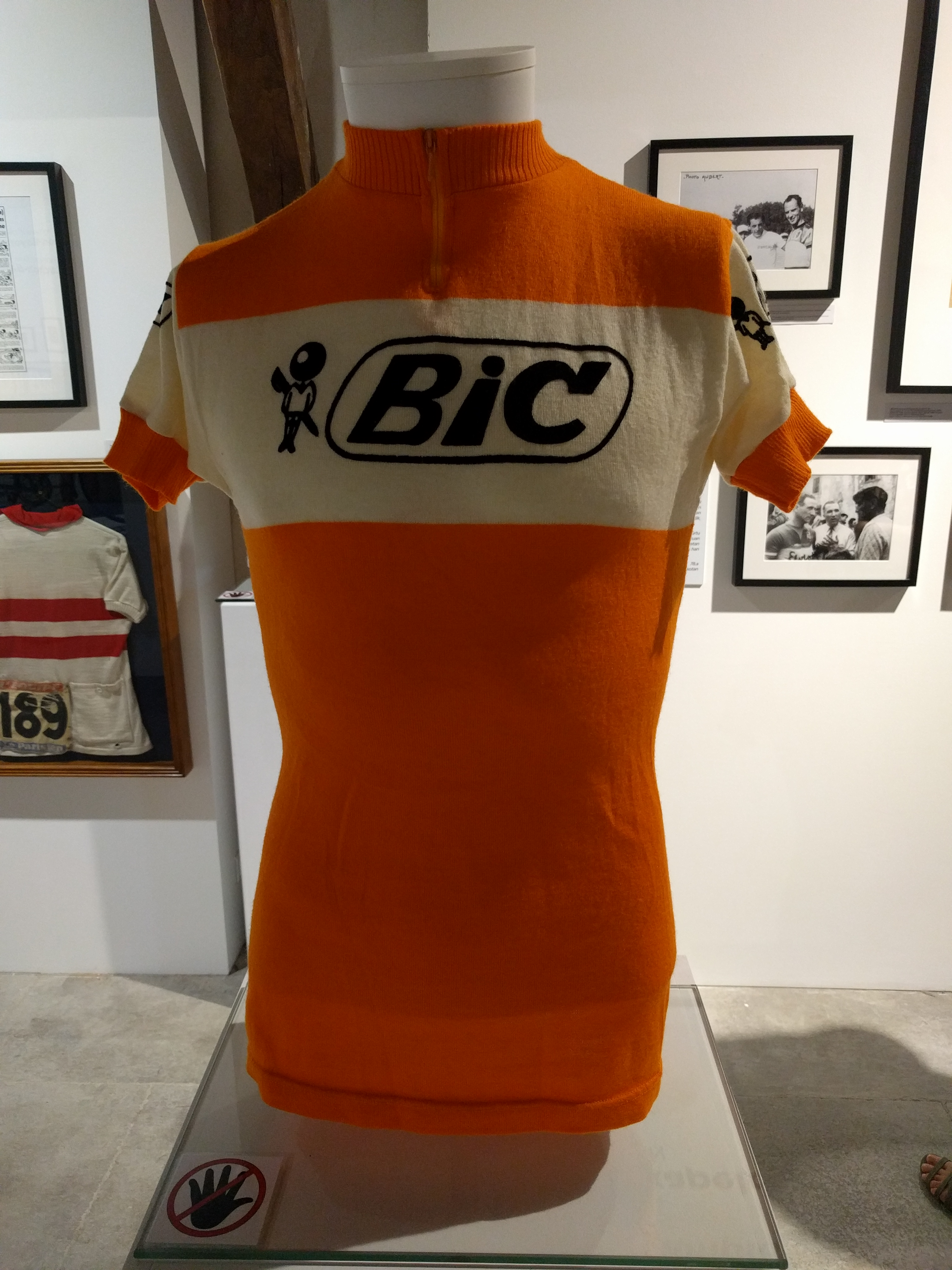
Ocaña's team Bic jersey.

=== Post-Tour career ===
After his win in the Tour de France, Ocaña finished third and won the bronze medal in the world championship road race. He also won the Vuelta Ciclista al País Vasco in 1973 and finished fourth in the 1974 Vuelta a España, won by Fuente. Ocaña was unable to defend his Tour de France win in 1974 due to an injury sustained during the Midi-Libre. He finished fourth again in the 1975 Vuelta a España. In 1976, he was back to top form and finished third in Paris–Nice and second overall in the Vuelta a España, a minute behind José Pesarrodona.

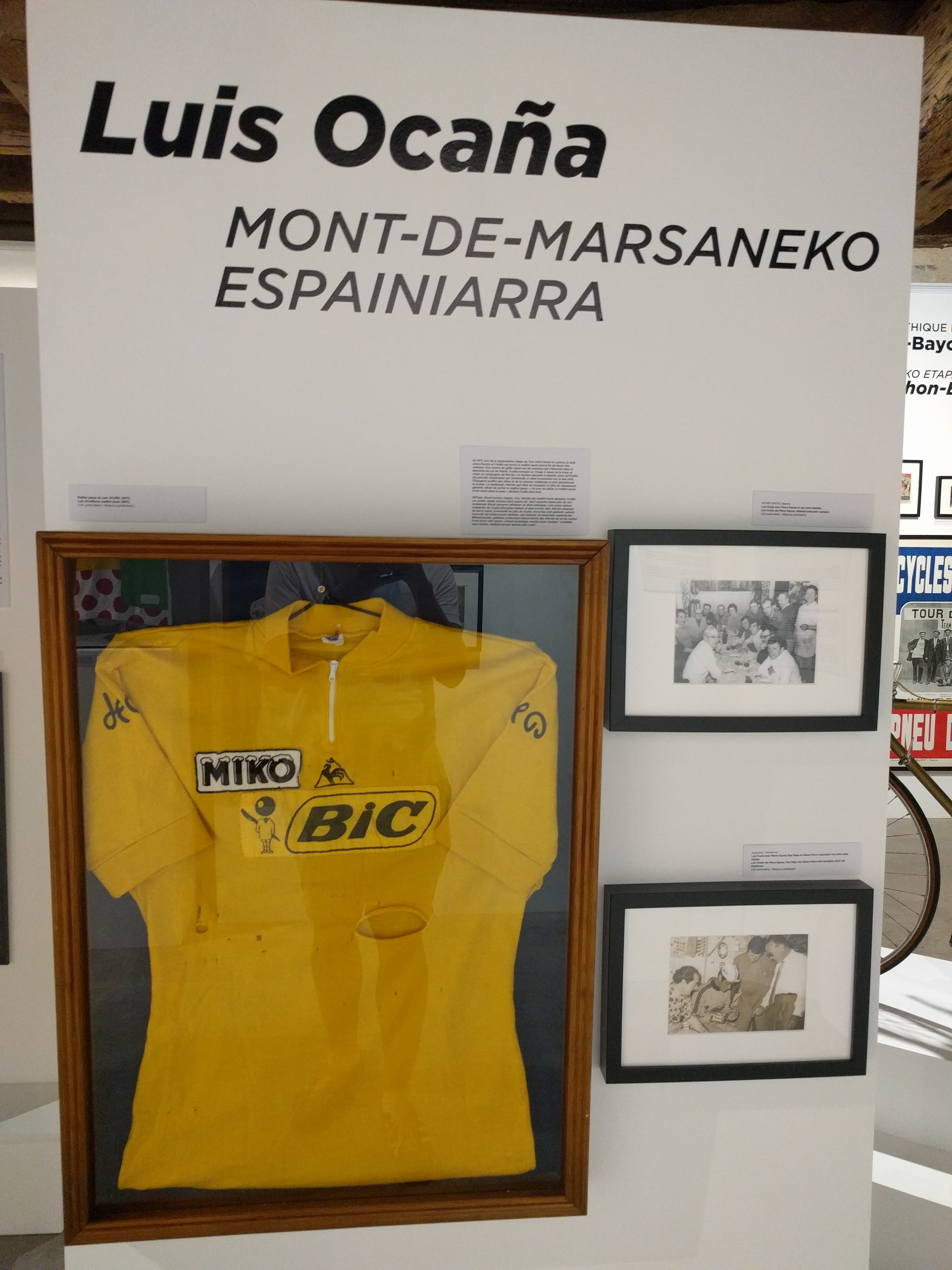
Ocaña's yellow jersey, 1973 Tour de France.

Ocaña retired at the end of 1977 after finishing 25th in the 1975 Tour de France. He had won 110 races including nine stages of the Tour de France. He retired to his vineyard in 1977. It is said that despite their rivalry on the road, Merckx organised for a Belgian distributor to order a sizeable quantity of wine from Ocaña's ailing vineyard.

== Death ==
Ocaña died by suicide, in Nogaro, Gers, France by gunshot in 1994. It is said he was depressed over financial matters and was also suffering from liver cirrhosis, hepatitis C, and cancer.

== Major results ==
1965
2nd Grand Prix de France
5th Mont Faron Hill Climb
1966
1st Vuelta al Bidasoa
3rd Mont Faron Hill Climb
1967
5th Mont Faron Hill Climb
6th Overall Grand Prix du Midi Libre
1968
1st Road race, National Road Championships
2nd Overall Escalada a Montjuïc
2nd Grand Prix Navarre
3rd Overall Vuelta a Andalucía

1st Stages 1, 2 & 6

3rd Trofeo Baracchi (with Jesús Aranzabal)
3rd Grand Prix des Nations
4th Overall Volta a Catalunya
5th Overall À travers Lausanne
1969
1st Overall Grand Prix du Midi Libre
1st Overall Setmana Catalana de Ciclisme

1st Stage 6 (ITT)

1st Overall Vuelta a La Rioja

1st Stage 3a (ITT)

2nd Overall Vuelta a España

1st Mountains classification
1st Stages 1a (ITT), 16 (ITT) & 18b (ITT)
Held after Stage 1a

3rd Overall Escalada a Montjuïc
3rd Subida a Arrate
6th Overall Tour of the Basque Country

1st Stage 3

8th Overall À travers Lausanne
9th Overall Vuelta a Levante
1970
1st Overall Vuelta a España

1st Prologue & Stage 19b (ITT)

1st Overall Critérium du Dauphiné Libéré

1st Stage 5b (ITT)

1st Stage 17 Tour de France
2nd Overall Paris–Nice
2nd Overall Escalada a Montjuïc
3rd Overall Setmana Catalana de Ciclisme

1st Stage 5b

3rd Grand Prix des Nations
7th Overall À travers Lausanne
7th Giro di Lombardia
7th Subida a Arrate
7th Gran Premio di Lugano
10th Overall Volta a Catalunya

1st Stage 7b (ITT)

1971
1st Overall Volta a Catalunya

1st Stage 5a

1st Overall Tour of the Basque Country

1st Stage 4b

1st Overall À travers Lausanne

1st Stages 1 & 2 (ITT)

1st Circuit de l'Aulne
1st Subida a Arrate
1st Grand Prix des Nations
1st Gran Premio di Lugano
1st Trofeo Baracchi (with Leif Mortensen)
Tour de France

1st Stages 8 & 11
Held after Stages 11–13

2nd Overall Critérium du Dauphiné Libéré

1st Mountains classification

2nd Overall Vuelta a Levante
3rd Overall Vuelta a España

1st Stage 12

3rd Overall Paris–Nice
3rd Overall Setmana Catalana de Ciclisme

1st Stage 1a (ITT)

3rd Overall Escalada a Montjuïc
3rd Baden-Baden (with Charly Grosskost)
7th Road race, National Road Championships
1972
1st Road race, National Road Championships
1st Overall Critérium du Dauphiné Libéré

1st Mountains classification
1st Stages 4a & 5a (ITT)

2nd Overall Four Days of Dunkirk
3rd Overall Paris–Nice
7th Overall Grand Prix du Midi Libre
1973
1st Overall Tour de France

1st Stages 7a, 8, 12a (ITT), 13, 18 & 20a (ITT)
Combativity award Overall

1st Overall Critérium du Dauphiné Libéré

1st Mountains classification
1st Prologue (TTT) & Stage 6b (ITT)

1st Overall Tour of the Basque Country

1st Stage 4b (ITT)

1st Overall Setmana Catalana de Ciclisme

1st Points classification
1st Stage 5a (ITT)

1st Subida a Arrate
1st Trophée des Grimpeurs
2nd Overall Vuelta a España
2nd Overall Vuelta a Cantabria
2nd Grand Prix des Nations
3rd Road race, UCI Road World Championships
3rd Overall Escalada a Montjuïc
3rd Tour du Haut Var
3rd Circuit de l'Aulne
4th Overall Volta a Catalunya

1st Stage 3b (ITT)

4th Overall À travers Lausanne
6th Overall Paris–Nice
1974
3rd Overall Tour of the Basque Country
4th Overall Vuelta a España
5th Overall Escalada a Montjuïc
6th Overall Critérium du Dauphiné Libéré
6th Subida a Arrate
7th Overall Trophée Méditerranéen
8th Grand Prix des Nations
9th Overall À travers Lausanne
10th Overall Volta a Catalunya
1975
2nd Overall Vuelta a Andalucía

1st Stage 7a (ITT)

2nd Overall Setmana Catalana de Ciclisme
2nd Subida a Arrate
3rd Overall Vuelta a Asturias
3rd Overall Vuelta a los Valles Mineros
4th Overall Vuelta a España
5th Overall Vuelta a La Rioja

1st Stage 2b (ITT)

7th Overall Volta a Catalunya
8th Road race, National Road Championships
8th Overall Vuelta a Levante
8th Overall Escalada a Montjuïc
9th Overall Paris–Nice
1976
2nd Overall Vuelta a España
3rd Overall Paris–Nice
4th Trophée des Grimpeurs
6th Overall Vuelta a Andalucía
9th Overall Tour of the Basque Country
10th Overall Étoile des Espoirs
1977
1st Prologue Tour Méditerranéen
10th Grand Prix des Nations

=== Grand Tour general classification results timeline ===
Grand Tour	1968	1969	1970	1971	1972	1973	1974	1975	1976	1977
Vuelta a España	DNF	2	1	3	—	2	4	4	2	22
Giro d'Italia	32	—	—	—	—	—	—	—	—	—
Tour de France	—	DNF	31	DNF	DNF	1	—	DNF	14	25

=== Major championship results timeline ===
	1968	1969	1970	1971	1972	1973	1974	1975	1976	1977
World Championships	DNF	DNF	DNF	DNF	—	3	DNF	—	—	—
National Championships	—	1	—	7	1	—	—	8	—	—

Legend
—	Did not compete
DNF	Did not finish

=== Grand Tour results timeline ===
Grand Tour	1968	1969	1970	1971	1972	1973	1974	1975	1976	1977
Vuelta a España	DNF	2	1	3	DNE	2	4	4	2	22
Stages won	0	3	2	1	—	0	0	0	0	0
Mountains classification	NR	1	4	4	—	NR	2	3	5	NR
Points classification	NR	NR	NR	NR	—	NR	NR	NR	NR	NR
Giro d'Italia	32	DNE	DNE	DNE	DNE	DNE	DNE	DNE	DNE	DNE
Stages won	0	—	—	—	—	—	—	—	—	—
Mountains classification	NR	—	—	—	—	—	—	—	—	—
Points classification	NR	—	—	—	—	—	—	—	—	—
Tour de France	DNE	DNF-8B	31	DNF-14	DNF-15	1	DNE	DNF-13	14	25
Stages won	—	0	1	2	0	6	—	0	0	0
Mountains classification	—	NR	NR	NR	NR	3	—	NR	NR	NR
Points classification	—	NR	9	NR	NR	3	—	NR	NR	NR

Legend
1	Winner
2–3	Top three-finish
4–10	Top ten-finish
11–	Other finish
DNE	Did not enter
DNF-x	Did not finish (retired on stage x)
DNS-x	Did not start (not started on stage x)
HD-x	Finished outside time limit (occurred on stage x)
DSQ	Disqualified
N/A	Race/classification not held
NR	Not ranked in this classification

== Bibliography ==
- Arribas, Carlos (2014). Ocaña. Translated by Cuadrado-Fernández, Antonio; Bell, Adrian. Norwich, UK: Mousehold Press. ISBN 978-1-874739-72-2.
- Fotheringham, Alasdair (2014). Reckless: The Life and Times of Luis Ocana. London: Bloomsbury Publishing. ISBN 978-1-4088-4602-5.
