= 1973 Giro d'Italia =

Race details
- Dates: 18 May – 9 June 1973
- Stages: 20 + Prologue
- Distance: 3,801 km (2,362 mi)
- Winning time: 106h 54' 41"

Results
Jersey awarded to the overall winner	Winner	Eddy Merckx (BEL)	(Molteni)
	Second	Felice Gimondi (ITA)	(Bianchi)
	Third	Giovanni Battaglin (ITA)	(Jolly Ceramica)
Jersey awarded to the points classification winner	Points	Eddy Merckx (BEL)	(Molteni)
	Mountains	José Manuel Fuente (ESP)	(KAS)
	Combination	Eddy Merckx (BEL)	(Molteni)
	Sprints	Domingo Perurena (ESP)	(KAS)
	Team points	Molteni	

The 1973 Giro d'Italia was the 56th running of the Giro, one of cycling's Grand Tours. It started in Verviers, Belgium, on 18 May, with a 5.2 km (3.2 mi) prologue and concluded with a 197 km (122 mi) mass-start stage, on 9 June. A total of 140 riders from fourteen teams entered the 20-stage race, that was won by Belgian Eddy Merckx of the Molteni team. The second and third places were taken by Italians Felice Gimondi and Giovanni Battaglin, respectively.

In addition to the general classification, Merckx won the points classification (taking six stages). Amongst the other classifications that the race awarded, José Manuel Fuente of KAS won the mountains classification. Molteni finished as the winners of the team points classification.

== Teams ==
Fourteen teams were invited by the race organizers to participate in the 1973 edition of the Giro d'Italia. In total, 90 riders were from Italy, while the remaining 50 riders came from: Belgium (23), Spain (10), France (5), Switzerland (4), Germany (2), the Netherlands (2), Columbia (1), Denmark (1), Luxembourg (1), and Sweden (1). Each team sent a squad of ten riders, which meant that the race started with a peloton of 140 cyclists.

Of those starting, 58 were riding the Giro d'Italia for the first time. The average age of riders was 26.87 years, ranging from 21–year–old Luciano Borgognoni (Dreher) to 39–year–old Aldo Moser (Filotex). The team with the youngest average rider age was Jollj Ceramica (24), while the oldest was Bianchi (29). 113 made it to the finish on Trieste.

The teams entering the race were:

- Molteni
- Bianchi
- Brooklyn
- Dreher
- Filotex
- Flandria
- G.B.C.
- Jollj Ceramica
- KAS
- Magniflex
- Ovest Rokado
- Sammontana
- Scic
- Zonca

== Pre-race favorites ==
Reigning and three-time champion Eddy Merckx (Molteni) announced he would race both the Vuelta a España and Giro. The break between these two races was only five days. Despite this, and coming off a victory at the Vuelta, Merckx entered the race favorite. Juan Del Bosque of El Mundo Deportivo stated that with the easy route, it won't make Merckx exert much effort to win for a fourth time. Merckx was believed to have a very strong team supporting him at the race, including the likes of Roger Swerts, Victor Van Schil, and Jos Deschoenmaecker, among others.

Felice Gimondi (Bianchi), who won the race in 1967 and 1969, was not viewed to be in good condition entering the race. Despite this he was still viewed as a contender for the overall crown. Molteni director Giorgio Albani felt Merckx's strongest competitor would be Gimondi. Albani elaborated that the Spaniards José Manuel Fuente, Francisco Galdós, and Santiago Lazcano were all dangerous riders in the mountains, but not threats for the overall crown. The KAS team was regarded as a strong opponent to the Molteni squad because of their climbing prowess. Specifically, the writer felt Fuente had performed very little during the 1973 campaign. One writer found Roger De Vlaeminck (Brooklyn) to be a dark horse for the general classification, while another source felt he would be Merckx's biggest threat. Fuente ordered a bike from Faliero Maso (who made bikes for Fausto Coppi) which was said to be a very light bike which should give him more stability. Former winner Gianni Motta (Zonca) also competed in the race and was viewed as a capable rider, but noted that his performances were irregular and his season had been lackluster up to that point. 1971 winner Gösta Pettersson (Ferretti), was viewed as a challenger for the general classification, but one writer felt he lost his "punch." Italo Zilioli (Dreher), Franco Bitossi (Sammontana), and Michele Dancelli (Scic) were other Italian riders that had chances to place high in the general classification.

Marino Basso (Bianchi), Gerben Karstens (Ovest Rokado), Rik Van Linden (Ovest Rokado), Patrick Sercu (Brooklyn), and Bitossi were thought to be the riders that would contend for the stages that finished in bunch sprints. Van Linden and Sercu had beaten the reigning world champion Basso several times during the season so far and one writer stated that he "will have a lot to do if he wants to be worthy of his rainbow jersey."

French filmmaker Claude Lelouch announced he would be making a film that centered around Merckx, which would incorporate footage from the Vuelta a España earlier in the year, along with this Giro d'Italia.

== Route and stages ==
Prior to 1973, there were rumors that the race would be starting in Belgium. Race director Vincenzo Torriani revealed the race route on 5 March 1973. The route was announced to be 3,777 km (2,347 mi) over the course of twenty stages that included one individual time trial, while it began with a prologue around Verviers, Wallonia. The race was regarded to have six flat stages and eight "wavy" stages. There were eleven stages containing twenty categorized climbs that awarded points for the mountains classification, with no summit finishes in the race. In total, the race climbed 22.3 km (13.9 mi), 2.4 km (1.5 mi) less than the previous year. The average length of each stage was 188.85 km (117.35 mi). The route did feature two rest days, on 23 May in Aosta and 4 June in Forte dei Marmi. When compared to the previous year's race, the race was 52 km (32 mi) longer, included a prologue, two less individual time trails, four less summit finishes, and had the same number of rest days.

The route was announced to start in Verviers, before heading towards Italy, passing through The Netherlands, West Germany, Luxembourg, France, and Switzerland. It was branded the "Tour of Europe." It was reported that roughly 50 million liras were paid to the Giro d'Italia from Verviers, Cologne, and the European Economic Community. The transfer from Strasbourg to Geneva was over 400 km (250 mi). The route notably finished in Trieste, rather than in Milan, the normal finish for the race. In addition, the route did not visit the Italian islands of Sardinia and Sicily, to which Squibbs from L'Impartial stated that "no one will complain" with regards to Sardinia, while Sicily he felt made the tifosi in various areas of the region "scream." The route as a whole does not venture into the southern half of Italy. It was believed to be that the reason for the avoidance of Milan and other larger cities in the 1973 route came from their large unruly crowds and recent social unrest. The Dolomites were featured in the last two stages of the race.

Upon release of the route in March, some thought it was not a difficult route and Torriani did not want to give Merckx an advantage. Gino Sala of l'Unita wrote following the route's initial reveal that Torriani may throw in some obstacles before the race started that were not in the presented route in March. With the announcement of the route that traveled through so many European nations, Sala speculated that Tour de France organizer Félix Lévitan would try to one-up the Giro for their 1974 race. Squibbs felt the route was well balanced and intelligently designed and thought the harder portions reserved for the very end would make the race garner more interest.

Stage characteristics and winners
Stage	Date	Course	Distance	Type		Winner
P	18 May	Verviers (Belgium)	5.2 km (3.2 mi)	Individual time trial	Two-man Time Trial (Note: The prologue for the 1973 Giro d'Italia was not a typical prologue as it was a two-man time trial, not the normal individual time trial. The results from the stage did not count towards the general classification, but were used to determine the first wearers of the maglia rosa (English: pink jersey) and maglia ciclamino (English: mauve, or purple, jersey). The rider with the quickest time of the two would wear the pink jersey, while the second placed rider wore the purple jersey. Merckx finished the fastest, which allowed him to wear the pink jersey the following day, while Swerts earned the purple jersey.)	Eddy Merckx (BEL); Roger Swerts (BEL)
1	19 May	Verviers to Cologne (West Germany)	137 km (85 mi)		Plain stage	Eddy Merckx (BEL)
2	20 May	Cologne to Luxembourg City (Luxembourg)	227 km (141 mi)		Plain stage	Roger De Vlaeminck (BEL)
3	21 May	Luxembourg City to Strasbourg (France)	239 km (149 mi)		Plain stage	Gustave Van Roosbroeck (BEL)
4	22 May	Geneva (Switzerland) to Aosta	163 km (101 mi)		Stage with mountain(s)	Eddy Merckx (BEL)
	23 May	Rest day				
5	24 May	St. Vincent to Milan	173 km (107 mi)		Plain stage	Gerben Karstens (NED)
6	25 May	Milan to Iseo	144 km (89 mi)		Stage with mountain(s)	Gianni Motta (ITA)
7	26 May	Iseo to Lido delle Nazioni	248 km (154 mi)		Plain stage	Rik Van Linden (BEL)
8	27 May	Lido delle Nazioni to Monte Carpegna	156 km (97 mi)		Stage with mountain(s)	Eddy Merckx (BEL)
9	28 May	Carpegna to Alba Adriatica	243 km (151 mi)		Plain stage	Patrick Sercu (BEL)
10	29 May	Alba Adriatica to Lanciano	174 km (108 mi)		Stage with mountain(s)	Eddy Merckx (BEL)
11	30 May	Lanciano to Benevento	230 km (143 mi)		Plain stage	Roger De Vlaeminck (BEL)
12	31 May	Benevento to Fiuggi	236 km (147 mi)		Stage with mountain(s)	Tullio Rossi (ITA)
13	1 June	Fiuggi to Bolsena	215 km (134 mi)		Stage with mountain(s)	Roger De Vlaeminck (BEL)
14	2 June	Bolsena to Florence	202 km (126 mi)		Plain stage	Francesco Moser (ITA)
15	3 June	Florence to Forte dei Marmi	150 km (93 mi)		Plain stage	Martín Emilio Rodríguez (COL)
	4 June	Rest day				
16	5 June	Forte dei Marmi to Forte dei Marmi	37 km (23 mi)		Individual Time Trial	Felice Gimondi (ITA)
17	6 June	Forte dei Marmi to Verona	244 km (152 mi)		Stage with mountain(s)	Rik Van Linden (BEL)
18	7 June	Verona to Andalo	173 km (107 mi)		Stage with mountain(s)	Eddy Merckx (BEL)
19	8 June	Andalo to Auronzo di Cadore	208 km (129 mi)		Stage with mountain(s)	José Manuel Fuente (ESP)
20	9 June	Auronzo di Cadore to Trieste	197 km (122 mi)		Stage with mountain(s)	Marino Basso (ITA)
	Total		3,801 km (2,362 mi)			

== Classification leadership ==
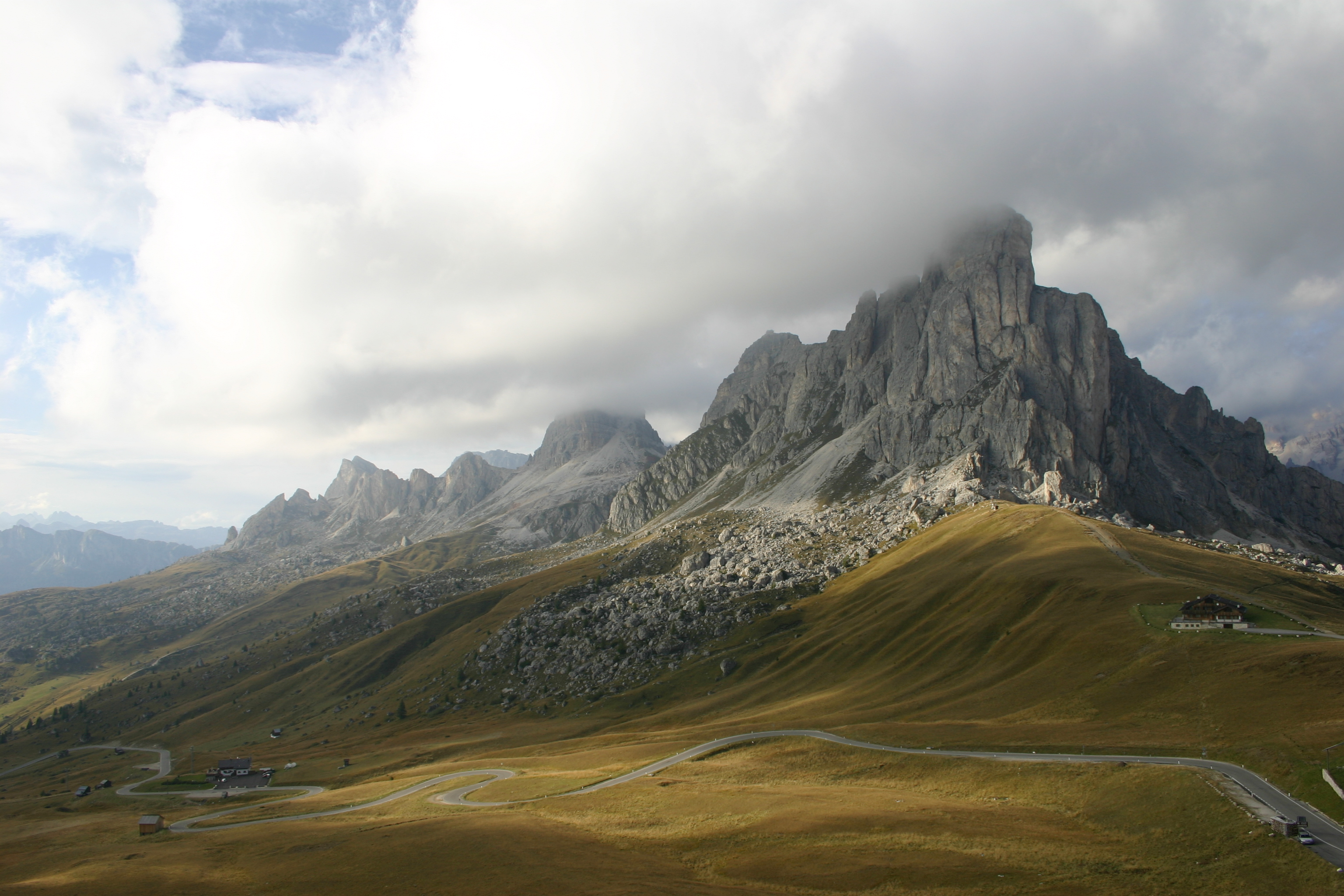
The Passo di Giau was the Cima Coppi for the 1973 running of the Giro d'Italia.

There were three main individual classifications contested in the 1973 Giro d'Italia, as well as a team competition. Three of them awarded jerseys to their leaders. The general classification was the most important and was calculated by adding each rider's finishing times on each stage. The rider with the lowest cumulative time was the winner of the general classification and was considered the overall winner of the Giro. The rider leading the classification wore a pink jersey to signify the classification's leadership.

The second classification was the points classification. Riders received points for finishing in the top positions in a stage finish, with first place getting the most points, and lower placings getting successively fewer points. The rider leading this classification wore a purple (or cyclamen) jersey.

The mountains classification was the third classification, but did not give a special jersey to its leader. In this ranking, points were won by reaching the summit of a climb ahead of other cyclists. Each climb was ranked as either first, second or third category, with more points available for higher category climbs. Most stages of the race included one or more categorized climbs, in which points were awarded to the riders that reached the summit first. The Cima Coppi, the race's highest point of elevation, awarded more points than the other first category climbs. The Cima Coppi for this Giro was the Passo di Giau. The first rider to cross the Passo di Giau was Spanish rider José Manuel Fuente.

The final classification, the team classification, awarded no jersey to its leaders. This was calculated by adding together points earned by each rider on the team during each stage through the intermediate sprints, the categorized climbs, stage finishes, etc. The team with the most points led the classification.

There were other minor classifications within the race, including the neo-professional competition. The classification was determined in the same way as the general classification, but considering only neo-professional cyclists (in their first three years of professional racing).

Another minor classification was the intermediate sprints classification, called the traguardi tricolori. On intermediate sprints, the first rider received 30 points for this classification, and the second rider 10 points. No jersey was used to indicate the leader. There was no time bonus at these intermediate sprints, and no points for the points classification.

There was also the combination classification, calculated by adding the positions in the four most important classifications (general, points, mountains and intermediate sprints).

Classification leadership by stage
Stage	Winner	General classification	Points classification	Mountains classification	Intermediate sprints classification	Team classification
P	Eddy Merckx & Roger Swerts	(Eddy Merckx)	(Roger Swerts)	not awarded	not awarded	not awarded
1	Eddy Merckx	Eddy Merckx	Eddy Merckx	not awarded	Ercole Gualazzini	?
2	Roger De Vlaeminck	Eddy Merckx	Eddy Merckx	not awarded	?	?
3	Gustave Van Roosbroeck	Eddy Merckx	Eddy Merckx	not awarded	?	?
4	Eddy Merckx	Eddy Merckx	Eddy Merckx	José Manuel Fuente	?	?
5	Gerben Karstens	Eddy Merckx	Eddy Merckx	José Manuel Fuente	?	?
6	Gianni Motta	Eddy Merckx	Eddy Merckx	Eddy Merckx	?	?
7	Rik Van Linden	Eddy Merckx	Eddy Merckx	Eddy Merckx	?	?
8	Eddy Merckx	Eddy Merckx	Eddy Merckx	Eddy Merckx	?	?
9	Patrick Sercu	Eddy Merckx	Eddy Merckx	Eddy Merckx	?	?
10	Eddy Merckx	Eddy Merckx	Eddy Merckx	Eddy Merckx	?	?
11	Roger De Vlaeminck	Eddy Merckx	Eddy Merckx	Eddy Merckx	?	?
12	Tullio Rossi	Eddy Merckx	Eddy Merckx	Eddy Merckx	?	?
13	Roger De Vlaeminck	Eddy Merckx	Eddy Merckx	Eddy Merckx	?	?
14	Francesco Moser	Eddy Merckx	Eddy Merckx	Eddy Merckx	?	?
15	Martín Emilio Rodríguez	Eddy Merckx	Roger De Vlaeminck	Eddy Merckx	?	?
16	Felice Gimondi	Eddy Merckx	Roger De Vlaeminck	Eddy Merckx	?	?
17	Rik Van Linden	Eddy Merckx	Roger De Vlaeminck	Eddy Merckx	?	?
18	Eddy Merckx	Eddy Merckx	Eddy Merckx	Eddy Merckx	Domingo Perurena	?
19	José Manuel Fuente	Eddy Merckx	Eddy Merckx	José Manuel Fuente	Domingo Perurena	?
20	Marino Basso	Eddy Merckx	Eddy Merckx	José Manuel Fuente	Domingo Perurena	Molteni
Final		Eddy Merckx	Eddy Merckx	José Manuel Fuente	Domingo Perurena	Molteni

== Final standings ==
Legend
Pink jersey	Denotes the winner of the General classification
Purple jersey	Denotes the winner of the Points classification

=== General classification ===
Final general classification (1–10)
Rank	Name	Team	Time
1	Eddy Merckx (BEL)	Molteni	106h 54' 41"
2	Felice Gimondi (ITA)	Bianchi	+ 7' 42"
3	Giovanni Battaglin (ITA)	Jollj Ceramica	+ 10' 20"
4	José Pesarrodona (ESP)	KAS	+ 15' 51"
5	Santiago Lazcano (ESP)	KAS	+ 19' 11"
6	Wladimiro Panizza (ITA)	G.B.C.	+ 19' 45"
7	Ole Ritter (DEN)	Bianchi	+ 24' 24"
8	José Manuel Fuente (ESP)	KAS	+ 26' 06"
9	Francisco Galdós (ESP)	KAS	+ 26' 35"
10	Gianni Motta (ITA)	Zonca	+ 26' 49"

=== Points classification ===
Final points classification (1–5)
	Rider	Team	Points
1	Eddy Merckx (BEL)	Molteni	237
2	Roger De Vlaeminck (BEL)	Brooklyn	216
3	Felice Gimondi (ITA)	Bianchi	146
4	Rik Van Linden (BEL)	Ovest Rokado	141
5	Gerben Karstens (NED)	Ovest Rokado	132

=== Mountains classification ===
Final mountains classification (1–10)
	Rider	Team	Points
1	José Manuel Fuente (ESP)	KAS	550
2	Eddy Merckx (BEL)	Molteni	510
3	Giovanni Battaglin (ITA)	Jollj Ceramica	180
4	Felice Gimondi (ITA)	Bianchi	110
5	Lino Farisato (ITA)	Scic	100
6	Wladimiro Panizza (ITA)	G.B.C.	70
6	Ole Ritter (DEN)	Bianchi	70
8	Italo Zilioli (ITA)	Dreher	30
8	Ottavio Crepaldi (ITA)	Zonca	30
8	Santiago Lazcano (ESP)	KAS	30

=== Combination classification ===
Final combination classification (1–4)
	Rider	Team	Points
1	Eddy Merckx (BEL)	Molteni	4
2	Felice Gimondi (ITA)	Bianchi	9
3	Giovanni Battaglin (ITA)	Jollj Ceramica	17
4	José Manuel Fuente (ESP)	KAS	18

=== Intermediate sprints classification ===
Final intermediate sprints classification (1–5)
	Rider	Team	Points
1	Domingo Perurena (ESP)	KAS	170
2	Ercole Gualazzini (ITA)	Bianchi	110
3	Gianni Motta (ITA)	Zonca	70
4	Joseph Bruyère (BEL)	Molteni	60
5	Enrico Paolini (ITA)	Scic	40
5	Piero Dallai (ITA)	Magniflex	40

=== Neo-professional classification ===
Final neo-professional classification (1–5)
	Rider	Team	Time
1	Giovanni Battaglin (ITA)	Jollj Ceramica	107h 05' 01"
2	Francesco Moser (ITA)	Filotex	+ 28' 22"
3	Hennie Kuiper (NED)	Rokado	+ 28' 30"
4	Walter Riccomi (ITA)	Sammontana	+ 1h 01' 34"
5	Luciano Conati (ITA)	Scic	+ 1h 06' 27"

=== Team classification ===
Final team classification (1–5)
	Team	Points
1	Molteni	7,731
2	Bianchi	4,434
3	Brooklyn	4,114
4	Rokado	3,534
5	KAS	3,534

== Doping ==
There was no positive doping test in the Giro of 1973.

== Aftermath ==
The race is documented in Jørgen Leth's 1974 film Stars and Watercarriers (Stjernerne og Vandbærerne).
