= 1973 Volta a Catalunya =

Race details
- Dates: 12–19 September 1973
- Stages: 7 + Prologue
- Distance: 1,215.9 km (755.5 mi)
- Winning time: 35h 10' 12"

Results
	Winner	Domingo Perurena (ESP)
	Second	Jesús Manzaneque (ESP)
	Third	Antonio Martos (ESP)

The 1973 Volta a Catalunya was the 53rd edition of the Volta a Catalunya cycle race and was held from 12 September to 19 September 1973. The race started in Amposta and finished in Lleida. The race was won by Domingo Perurena.

== General classification ==
Final general classification

Rank	Rider	Time
1	Domingo Perurena (ESP)	35h 10' 12"
2	Jesús Manzaneque (ESP)	+ 6"
3	Antonio Martos (ESP)	+ 10"
4	Luis Ocaña (ESP)	+ 19"
5	Wladimiro Panizza (ITA)	+ 44"
6	José Antonio Pontón Ruiz (ESP)	+ 1' 18"
7	Miguel María Lasa (ESP)	+ 1' 19"
8	José Pesarrodona (ESP)	+ 1' 19"
9	Agustín Tamames (ESP)	+ 1' 58"
10	Hennie Kuiper (NED)	+ 2' 05"
