= 1972 Tour of the Basque Country =

Race details
- Dates: 19–23 April 1972
- Stages: 5
- Distance: 810 km (503.3 mi)
- Winning time: 23h 17' 47"

Results
	Winner	José Antonio González Linares (ESP)	(Kas–Kaskol)
	Second	Jesús Manzaneque (ESP)	(Kas–Kaskol)
	Third	Jesús Esperanza (ESP)	(La Casera)

The 1972 Tour of the Basque Country was the 12th edition of the Tour of the Basque Country cycle race and was held from 19 April to 23 April 1972. The race started and finished in Eibar. The race was won by José Antonio González Linares of the Kas team.

== General classification ==
Final general classification

Rank	Rider	Team	Time
1	José Antonio González Linares (ESP)	Kas–Kaskol	23h 17' 47"
2	Jesús Manzaneque (ESP)	Kas–Kaskol	+ 1' 06"
3	Jesús Esperanza (ESP)	La Casera	+ 1' 10"
4	Ventura Díaz (ESP)	Werner	+ 1' 44"
5	José Gómez Lucas (ESP)	Werner	+ 1' 45"
6	José Luis Uribezubia (ESP)	Werner	+ 1' 46"
7	Andrés Oliva (ESP)	La Casera	+ 1' 48"
8	Gonzalo Aja (ESP)	Karpy	+ 1' 58"
9	Vicente López Carril (ESP)	Kas–Kaskol	+ 2' 11"
10	Santiago Lazcano (ESP)	Kas–Kaskol	+ 2' 53"
