= 1975 Tour of the Basque Country =

Race details
- Dates: 14–18 April 1975
- Stages: 5
- Distance: 830 km (515.7 mi)
- Winning time: 24h 30' 30"

Results
	Winner	José Antonio González Linares (ESP)	(Kas–Kaskol)
	Second	Jesús Manzaneque (ESP)	(Monteverde)
	Third	Agustín Tamames (ESP)	(Super Ser)

The 1975 Tour of the Basque Country was the 15th edition of the Tour of the Basque Country cycle race and was held from 14 April to 18 April 1975. The race started in Irun and finished in Hondarribia. The race was won by José Antonio González Linares of the Kas team.

== General classification ==
Final general classification

Rank	Rider	Team	Time
1	José Antonio González Linares (ESP)	Kas–Kaskol	24h 30' 30"
2	Jesús Manzaneque (ESP)	Monteverde	+ 20"
3	Agustín Tamames (ESP)	Super Ser	+ 38"
4	José Viejo (ESP)	Super Ser	+ 1' 21"
5	José Martins (POR)	Coelima	+ 1' 28"
6	Miguel María Lasa (ESP)	Kas–Kaskol	+ 1' 59"
7	Pedro Torres (ESP)	Super Ser	+ 2' 58"
8	Manuel Rego (POR)	Coelima	+ 3' 05"
9	Francisco Galdós (ESP)	Kas–Kaskol	+ 3' 30"
10	Santiago Lazcano (ESP)	Super Ser	+ 3' 31"
