= Tour of the Basque Country =

Spanish multi-day road cycling race

Race details
- Date: Early-April
- Region: Spanish Basque Country
- English name: Tour of the Basque Country
- Local names: Vuelta al País Vasco (in Spanish); Euskal Herriko itzulia (in Basque)
- Discipline: Road
- Competition: UCI World Tour
- Type: Major one week stage race
- Web site: www.itzulia.eus

History
- First edition: 1924
- Editions: 65 (as of 2026)
- First winner: Francis Pélissier (FRA)
- Most wins: José Antonio González (ESP); Alberto Contador (ESP); (4 wins each)
- Most recent: Paul Seixas (FRA)

The Tour of the Basque Country (Officially: Itzulia Basque Country) is an annual road cycling stage race held in the Spanish Basque Country in April. It is one of the races that make up the UCI World Tour calendar. As the Basque Country is a mountainous area, there are few flat stages, and thus the event favors those who are strong climbers. The race is characterized by its short stages, rarely exceeding 200 km, and steep ascents. While the ascents featured in the race are not particularly high compared to other stage races, they are among the steepest seen in professional cycling, some having sections with gradients reaching well above 20%.

== History ==
The original Tour of the Basque Country had a troubled history, with eight editions contested between 1924 and 1935, before the Spanish Civil War seemingly wiped it out for good. One of these early editions is commentated on in Ernest Hemingway's 1926 novel The Sun Also Rises.

In 1952, the Eibar Cycling Club (erstwhile backers of Spain's first national stage race, the pre-Vuelta a España Gran Premio República) launched a new 3-day event called Gran Premio de la Bicicleta Eibarresa to celebrate its 25th anniversary. Former French national champion Louis Caput took the inaugural edition.

In 1969, organizers opted to promote the race (by then five stages long) as IX Vuelta al País Vasco - XVIII Bicicleta Eibarresa, effectively merging the Bicicleta Eibarresa into a reborn Tour of the Basque Country. However, the palmares of the Bicicleta Eibarresa (featuring Vuelta a España winners Jesús Loroño and Rolf Wolfshohl) is not recognized as part of the Tour of the Basque Country's history. The Eibar Cycling Club would relinquish control of the competition following the 1973 edition, while retaining the rights to the Bicicleta Eibarresa name, which has sporadically been reactivated to help promote other, lower ranked events.

The first winner of the Tour of the Basque Country was Francis Pélissier from France, while the first winner of the 'modern' Tour (1969) was Jacques Anquetil, also of France. The most successful riders in the history of the Tour are Spain's José Antonio González, who won the race four times in 1972, 1975, 1977 and 1978, and Spain's Alberto Contador, who also won the race four times in 2008, 2009, 2014 and 2016. Since its revival in 1969, it has been held every year with the exception of 2020 due to the COVID-19 pandemic.

From 2022, the race has a counterpart in the UCI Women's World Tour - the Itzulia Women.

The winner traditionally dons a basque beret on the podium.

== Winners ==
Year	Country	Rider	Team
1924	France	Francis Pélissier	
1925	Belgium	Auguste Verdyck	
1926	Luxembourg	Nicolas Frantz	
1927	France	Victor Fontan	
1928	Belgium	Maurice De Waele	
1929	Belgium	Maurice De Waele	
1930	Spain	Mariano Cañardo	
1931– 1934	No race		
1935	Italy	Gino Bartali	
1936– 1968	No race		
1969	France	Jacques Anquetil	
1970	Spain	Luis Pedro Santamarina	
1971	Spain	Luis Ocaña	
1972	Spain	José Antonio González	
1973	Spain	Luis Ocaña	
1974	Spain	Miguel María Lasa	
1975	Spain	José Antonio González	
1976	Italy	Gianbattista Baronchelli	
1977	Spain	José Antonio González	
1978	Spain	José Antonio González	
1979	Italy	Giovanni Battaglin	
1980	Spain	Alberto Fernández	
1981	Italy	Silvano Contini	
1982	Spain	José Luis Laguía	Reynolds
1983	Spain	Julián Gorospe	Reynolds
1984	Ireland	Sean Kelly	Skil–Reydel–Sem–Mavic
1985	Spain	Pello Ruiz Cabestany	Seat–Orbea
1986	Ireland	Sean Kelly	Kas
1987	Ireland	Sean Kelly	Kas
1988	Netherlands	Erik Breukink	Panasonic–Isostar–Colnago–Agu
1989	Ireland	Stephen Roche	Fagor–MBK
1990	Spain	Julián Gorospe	Banesto
1991	Italy	Claudio Chiappucci	Carrera Jeans–Tassoni
1992	Switzerland	Tony Rominger	CLAS–Cajastur
1993	Switzerland	Tony Rominger	CLAS–Cajastur
1994	Switzerland	Tony Rominger	Mapei–CLAS
1995	Switzerland	Alex Zülle	ONCE
1996	Italy	Francesco Casagrande	Saeco–AS Juvenes San Marino
1997	Switzerland	Alex Zülle	ONCE
1998	Spain	Íñigo Cuesta	ONCE
1999	France	Laurent Jalabert	ONCE–Deutsche Bank
2000	Germany	Andreas Klöden	Team Telekom
2001	Lithuania	Raimondas Rumšas	Fassa Bortolo
2002	Spain	Aitor Osa	iBanesto.com
2003	Spain	Iban Mayo	Euskaltel–Euskadi
2004	Russia	Denis Menchov	Illes Balears–Banesto
2005	Italy	Danilo Di Luca	Liquigas–Bianchi
2006	Spain	José Ángel Gómez Marchante	Saunier Duval–Prodir
2007	Spain	Juan José Cobo	Saunier Duval–Prodir
2008	Spain	Alberto Contador	Astana
2009	Spain	Alberto Contador	Astana
2010	United States	Chris Horner	Team RadioShack
2011	Germany	Andreas Klöden	Team RadioShack
2012	Spain	Samuel Sánchez	Euskaltel–Euskadi
2013	Colombia	Nairo Quintana	Movistar Team
2014	Spain	Alberto Contador	Tinkoff–Saxo
2015	Spain	Joaquim Rodríguez	Team Katusha
2016	Spain	Alberto Contador	Tinkoff
2017	Spain	Alejandro Valverde	Movistar Team
2018	Slovenia	Primož Roglič	LottoNL–Jumbo
2019	Spain	Ion Izagirre	Astana
2020	No race due to the COVID-19 pandemic		
2021	Slovenia	Primož Roglič	Team Jumbo–Visma
2022	Colombia	Daniel Martínez	INEOS Grenadiers
2023	Denmark	Jonas Vingegaard	Team Jumbo–Visma
2024	Spain	Juan Ayuso	UAE Team Emirates
2025	Portugal	João Almeida	UAE Team Emirates XRG
2026	France	Paul Seixas	Decathlon CMA CGM

=== Multiple winners ===
Wins	Rider	Editions
4	José Antonio González (ESP)	1972, 1975, 1977, 1978
4	Alberto Contador (ESP)	2008, 2009, 2015, 2016
3	Sean Kelly (IRL)	1984, 1986, 1987
3	Tony Rominger (SUI)	1992, 1993, 1994
2	Maurice Dewaele (BEL)	1928, 1929
2	Luis Ocaña (ESP)	1971, 1973
2	Julián Gorospe (ESP)	1983, 1990
2	Alex Zülle (SUI)	1995, 1997
2	Andreas Klöden (GER)	2000, 2011
2	Primož Roglič (SLO)	2018, 2021

=== Most stage wins ===
#	Rider	Stage wins
1	Domingo Perurena (ESP)	11
1	Seán Kelly (IRL)	11
3	Laurent Jalabert (FRA)	9
4	Tony Rominger (SUI)	8
4	Samuel Sánchez (ESP)	8
6	Alberto Contador (ESP)	7
7	Miguel María Lasa (ESP)	6
7	Joaquim Rodriguez (ESP)	6
7	Alejandro Valverde (ESP)	6
7	Primož Roglič (SLO)	6
11	José Antonio González Linares (ESP)	5
11	Stefano Zanini (ITA)	5

=== Wins per country ===
Wins	Country
28	Spain
7	Italy
5	France; Switzerland
4	Ireland
3	Belgium
2	Colombia; Germany; Slovenia
1	Denmark; Lithuania; Luxembourg; Netherlands; Portugal; Russia; United States
