= Francisco Galdós =

Spanish cyclist (born 1947)

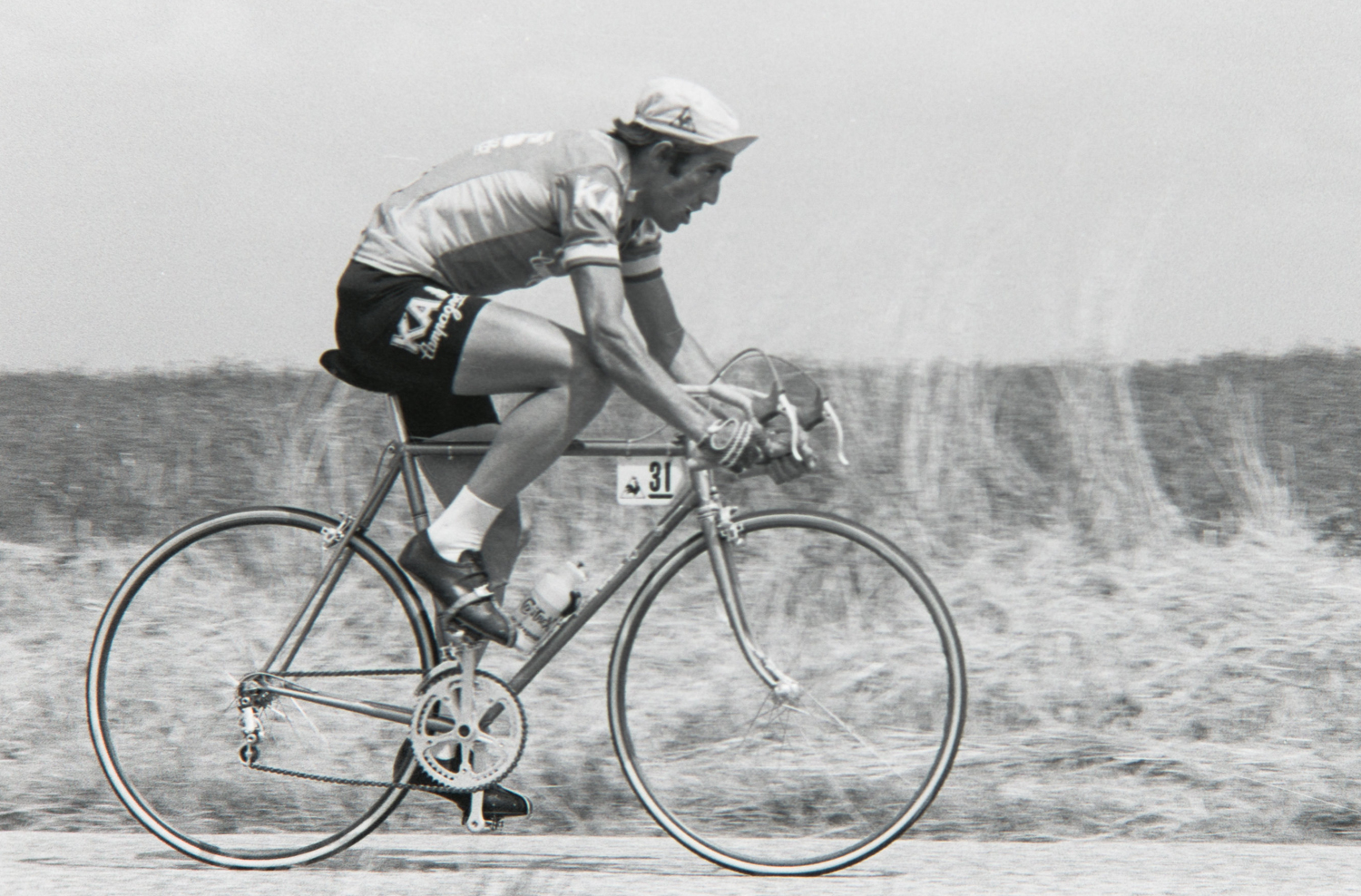

Personal information
- Full name: Francisco Galdós Gauna
- Born: May 6, 1947 (age 79) Lasarte, Spain

Cycling career
- Sport: Cycling
- Current team: Retired
- Discipline: Road
- Role: Rider
- Rider type: All-rounder

Professional teams
- 1969–1979: Kas–Kaskol
- 1980: Kelme–Gios

Major wins
- Grand Tours Giro d'Italia Mountains classification (1975) 1 individual stage (1975) Stage races Tour de Romandie (1975)

Francisco Galdós Gauna (born May 6, 1947 in Lasarte, Álava) is a Spanish former professional road racing cyclist. He finished second in the 1975 Giro d'Italia and 1979 Vuelta a España, third in 1972 Giro d'Italia, sixth in the 1976 Tour de France, and fourth in the 1977 Tour de France. He finished in the top 10 of eleven Grand Tours, including three podium finishes.

== Major results ==
1968
1st Overall Vuelta a Cantabria
1969
2nd Overall Vuelta a Cantabria
3rd Overall Vuelta a La Rioja
8th Overall Critérium du Dauphiné Libéré
1970
2nd Overall Volta a Catalunya
3rd GP Villafranca de Ordizia
6th Overall Vuelta a España
9th Overall Tour de France
1971
4th Overall Giro d'Italia
6th Druivenkoers Overijse
10th Overall Tour of the Basque Country
1972
1st Trofeo Masferrer
2nd Overall Vuelta a Cantabria
3rd Overall Giro d'Italia
3rd GP Pascuas
1973
2nd Overall Vuelta a La Rioja
2nd GP Villafranca de Ordizia
3rd Subida a Arrate
4th Overall Tour de Suisse
7th Trofeo Masferrer
9th Overall Giro d'Italia
1975
1st Overall Tour de Romandie

1st Stage 4

1st Subida a Arrate
2nd Overall Giro d'Italia

1st Mountains classification
1st Stage 21

5th Overall Setmana Catalana de Ciclisme
6th Tour du Haut Var
7th Road race, National Road Championships
9th Overall Tour of the Basque Country
10th Overall À travers Lausanne
1976
1st Overall Vuelta a Cantabria

1st Stage 2b

6th Overall Tour de France
1977
1st Overall Vuelta a Cantabria

1st Stage 2

3rd Overall Escalada a Montjuïc
4th Overall Tour de France
8th Overall Volta a Catalunya
8th GP Villafranca de Ordizia
10th Road race, National Road Championships
10th Subida a Arrate
1978
1st Overall Vuelta a La Rioja
2nd Overall Volta a Catalunya

1st Stage 5

3rd Overall Critérium du Dauphiné Libéré
4th Overall Escalada a Montjuïc
7th Overall Tour de France
7th Overall Tour de Suisse
7th Subida a Arrate
1979
2nd Overall Vuelta a España
3rd Overall Critérium du Dauphiné Libéré
1980
8th Overall Vuelta a España

=== Grand Tour general classification results timeline ===
Grand Tour	1969	1970	1971	1972	1973	1974	1975	1976	1977	1978	1979	1980
Vuelta a España	—	6	—	18	—	—	—	—	—	—	2	8
Giro d'Italia	—	—	4	3	9	17	2	18	—	—	—	—
Tour de France	21	9	11	—	20	DNF	DNF	6	4	7	28	DNF

Legend
—	Did not compete
DNF	Did not finish
