= 1971 Tour of the Basque Country =

Race details
- Dates: 21–25 April 1971
- Stages: 5
- Distance: 875 km (543.7 mi)
- Winning time: 24h 31' 53"

Results
	Winner	Luis Ocaña (ESP)	(Bic)
	Second	Raymond Poulidor (FRA)	(Fagor–Mercier–Hutchinson)
	Third	Miguel María Lasa (ESP)	(Orbea)

The 1971 Tour of the Basque Country was the 11th edition of the Tour of the Basque Country cycle race and was held from 21 April to 25 April 1971. The race started and finished in Eibar. The race was won by Luis Ocaña of the Bic team.

== General classification ==
Final general classification

Rank	Rider	Team	Time
1	Luis Ocaña (ESP)	Bic	24h 31' 53"
2	Raymond Poulidor (FRA)	Fagor–Mercier–Hutchinson	+ 1' 06"
3	Miguel María Lasa (ESP)	Orbea	+ 1' 10"
4	Bernard Labourdette (FRA)	Bic	+ 1' 44"
5	Francisco Gabica (ESP)	Kas–Kaskol	+ 1' 45"
6	Jesús Manzaneque (ESP)	Kas–Kaskol	+ 1' 46"
7	Francisco Javier Galdeano (ESP)	Kas–Kaskol	+ 1' 48"
8	Cyrille Guimard (FRA)	Fagor–Mercier–Hutchinson	+ 1' 58"
9	Luis Santamarina (ESP)	Werner	+ 2' 11"
10	Francisco Galdós (ESP)	Kas–Kaskol	+ 2' 53"
