= 1974 Critérium du Dauphiné Libéré =

Race details
- Dates: 3–10 June 1974
- Stages: 7 + Prologue
- Distance: 1,315.8 km (817.6 mi)
- Winning time: 37h 10' 14"

Results
	Winner	Alain Santy (FRA)	(Gan–Mercier–Hutchinson)
	Second	Raymond Poulidor (FRA)	(Gan–Mercier–Hutchinson)
	Third	Jean-Pierre Danguillaume (FRA)	(Peugeot–BP–Michelin)
	Points	Domingo Perurena (ESP)	(Kas–Kaskol)
	Mountains	Raymond Poulidor (FRA)	(Gan–Mercier–Hutchinson)
	Team	Kas–Kaskol	

The 1974 Critérium du Dauphiné Libéré was the 26th edition of the cycle race and was held from 3 June to 10 June 1974. The race started in Roanne and finished at Avignon. The race was won by Alain Santy of the Gan–Mercier team.

== Teams ==
Ten teams, containing a total of 100 riders, participated in the race:

- Bic
- Carpenter–Confortluxe–Flandria
- Gan–Mercier–Hutchinson
- Jobo–Lejeune
- Kas–Kaskol
- La Casera–Peña Bahamontes
- Merlin Plage–Shimano–Flandria
- Peugeot–BP–Michelin
- Sonolor–Gitane
- Watney–Maes Pils

== Route ==
Stage characteristics and winners
Stage	Date	Course	Distance	Type	Winner
P	3 June	Roanne	7.85 km (4.88 mi)	Team time trial	Kas–Kaskol
1a	4 June	Roanne to Chalon-sur-Saône	145 km (90 mi)		Domingo Perurena (ESP)
1b	4 June	Chalon-sur-Saône to Mâcon	75 km (47 mi)		Gerrie Knetemann (NED)
2	5 June	Mâcon to Lons-le-Saunier	194 km (121 mi)		Bernard Croyet (FRA)
3	6 June	Lons-le-Saunier to Lyon	218 km (135 mi)		Frans Van Looy (BEL)
4	7 June	Lyon to Grenoble	186 km (116 mi)		Alain Santy (FRA)
5	8 June	Grenoble to Gap	171 km (106 mi)		José Catieau (FRA)
6a	9 June	Veynes to Privas	144 km (89 mi)		Juan Manuel Santisteban (ESP)
6b	9 June	Privas to Vals-les-Bains	34 km (21 mi)	Individual time trial	Raymond Poulidor (FRA)
7	10 June	Vals-les-Bains to Avignon	216 km (134 mi)		Jesús Manzaneque (ESP)

== General classification ==
Final general classification

Rank	Rider	Team	Time
1	Alain Santy (FRA)	Gan–Mercier–Hutchinson	37h 10' 14"
2	Raymond Poulidor (FRA)	Gan–Mercier–Hutchinson	+ 4"
3	Jean-Pierre Danguillaume (FRA)	Peugeot–BP–Michelin	+ 48"
4	Miguel María Lasa (ESP)	Kas–Kaskol	+ 1' 42"
5	Roger Pingeon (FRA)	Jobo–Lejeune	+ 1' 47"
6	Luis Ocaña (ESP)	Bic	+ 6' 39"
7	José Pesarrodona (ESP)	Kas–Kaskol	+ 7' 06"
8	Domingo Perurena (ESP)	Kas–Kaskol	+ 7' 36"
9	Mariano Martínez (ESP)	Sonolor–Gitane	+ 9' 20"
10	Andrés Oliva (ESP)	La Casera–Peña Bahamontes	+ 10' 53"
