= 1970 Volta a Catalunya =

Race details
- Dates: 10–18 September 1970
- Stages: 9
- Distance: 1,564.5 km (972.1 mi)
- Winning time: 43h 00' 31"

Results
	Winner	Franco Bitossi (ITA)
	Second	Francisco Galdós (ESP)
	Third	Bernard Labourdette (FRA)

The 1970 Volta a Catalunya was the 50th edition of the Volta a Catalunya cycle race and was held from 10 September to 18 September 1970. The race started in Manresa and finished in Barcelona. It was won by Franco Bitossi.

== General classification ==
Final general classification

Rank	Rider	Time
1	Franco Bitossi (ITA)	43h 00' 31"
2	Francisco Galdós (ESP)	+ 1' 05"
3	Bernard Labourdette (FRA)	+ 2' 21"
4	Miguel María Lasa (ESP)	+ 2' 28"
5	Luis Zubero (ESP)	+ 2' 41"
6	Jesús Manzaneque (ESP)	+ 3' 19"
7	Ventura Díaz (ESP)	+ 3' 52"
8	Enrique Sahagún (ESP)	+ 4' 42"
9	Gabriel Mascaró Febrer (ESP)	+ 4' 56"
10	Luis Ocaña (ESP)	+ 5' 05"
