= 1977 Tour of the Basque Country =

Race details
- Dates: 28 March–1 April 1977
- Stages: 5
- Distance: 640 km (397.7 mi)
- Winning time: 17h 23' 32"

Results
	Winner	José Antonio González Linares (ESP)	(Kas–Campagnolo)
	Second	Paul Wellens (BEL)	(Frisol–Thirion–Gazelle)
	Third	Jean-Pierre Baert (BEL)	(Frisol–Thirion–Gazelle)

The 1977 Tour of the Basque Country was the 17th edition of the Tour of the Basque Country cycle race and was held from 28 March to 1 April 1977. The race started in Hondarribia and finished in Goiuria. The race was won by José Antonio González Linares of the Kas team.

== General classification ==
Final general classification

Rank	Rider	Team	Time
1	José Antonio González Linares (ESP)	Kas–Campagnolo	17h 23' 32"
2	Paul Wellens (BEL)	Frisol–Thirion–Gazelle	+ 50"
3	Jean-Pierre Baert (BEL)	Frisol–Thirion–Gazelle	+ 1' 24"
4	Rafael Ladrón (ESP)	Kas–Campagnolo	+ 3' 15"
5	Francisco Elorriaga (ESP)	Teka	+ 3' 33"
6	Jordi Fortià Martí (ESP)	Novostil–Transmallorca	+ 5' 23"
7	Antonio Menéndez (ESP)	Kas–Campagnolo	+ 5' 37"
8	Custodio Mazuela (ESP)	Novostil–Transmallorca	+ 5' 40"
9	José Enrique Cima (ESP)	Kas–Campagnolo	+ 5' 42"
10	Fedor den Hertog (NED)	Frisol–Thirion–Gazelle	+ 6' 04"
