= 1972 Paris–Nice =

Race details
- Dates: 9–16 March 1972
- Stages: 7 + Prologue
- Distance: 1,208.9 km (751.2 mi)
- Winning time: 31h 43' 57"

Results
| Jersey awarded to the overall winner | Winner | Raymond Poulidor (FRA) | (Gan–Mercier–Hutchinson) |
| | Second | Eddy Merckx (BEL) | (Molteni) |
| | Third | Luis Ocaña (ESP) | (Bic) |

The 1972 Paris–Nice was the 30th edition of the Paris–Nice cycle race and was held from 9 March to 16 March 1972. The race started in Paris and finished in Nice. The race was won by Raymond Poulidor of the Gan team.

== General classification ==
Final general classification

| Rank | Rider | Team | Time |
|---|---|---|---|
| 1 | Raymond Poulidor (FRA) | Gan–Mercier–Hutchinson | 31h 43' 57" |
| 2 | Eddy Merckx (BEL) | Molteni | + 6" |
| 3 | Luis Ocaña (ESP) | Bic | + 52" |
| 4 | Raymond Delisle (FRA) | Peugeot–BP–Michelin | + 1' 15" |
| 5 | Miguel María Lasa (ESP) | Kas–Kaskol | + 1' 19" |
| 6 | Leif Mortensen (DEN) | Bic | + 1' 35" |
| 7 | Roger Pingeon (FRA) | Peugeot–BP–Michelin | + 1' 41" |
| 8 | Willy De Geest (BEL) | Van Cauter–Magniflex–de Gribaldy | + 1' 44" |
| 9 | Yves Hézard (FRA) | Sonolor–Lejeune | + 1' 49" |
| 10 | Joop Zoetemelk (NED) | Beaulieu–Flandria | + 1' 51" |
