= Vuelta a Cantabria =

Annual road cycling race

Race details
- Date: September
- Region: Cantabria, Spain
- English name: Tour of Cantabria
- Discipline: Road
- Type: Stage race

History
- First edition: 1925
- Editions: 53 (as of 2024)
- First winner: Teodoro Monteys (ESP)
- Most wins: Francisco Galdós (ESP) (3 wins)
- Most recent: Héctor Álvarez (ESP)

The Vuelta a Cantabria is a multi-day road cycling race held annually in the region of Cantabria, Spain. Created in 1925, the race was also held in 1926, 1940 and 1942, and annually from 1963 to 1983. In 2003, the race reappeared after a 20-year disappearance and is now reserved to amateur cyclists.

== Winners ==
Year	Winner	Second place	Third place
1925	(Spain) Teodoro Monteys	(Spain) Miguel Mucio	(Spain) Juan de Juan
1926	(Spain) Mariano Cañardo	(Spain) Juan de Juan	(Spain) Victorino Otero
1927–1939	No race		
1940	(Spain) Fermín Trueba	(Spain) Antonio Andrés Sancho	(Spain) Delio Rodríguez
1941	No race		
1942	(Spain) Delio Rodríguez		
1943	No race		
1944	(Spain) Martín Mancisidor	(Spain) Julián Berrendero	(Spain) Miguel Casas
1945–1962	No race		
1963	(Spain) Saturnino López	(Spain) Francisco Redondo	(Spain) Andrés Gandarias
1964	(Spain) Gregorio San Miguel	(Spain) Guillermo Fernández	(Portugal) Carlos Rodrigues
1965	(Spain) Domingo Perurena	(Spain) José Ignacio Ascasibar	(Spain) Saturnino López
1966	(Spain) José Albelda Tormo	(Spain) Luis Balagué	(Spain) José Ramón Gomineche
1967	(Spain) Ramón Pagès	(Spain) José Ignacio Ascasibar	(Belgium) Pierre Bellemans
1968	(Spain) Francisco Galdós	(Spain) Santiago Lazcano	(Spain) Manuel Antonio García
1969	(Spain) Santiago Lazcano	(Spain) Francisco Galdós	(Spain) Enrique Sahagún
1970	(Spain) Andrés Oliva	(Spain) José Casas	(Spain) Daniel Varela
1971	(Spain) Gonzalo Aja	(Spain) Andrés Oliva	(Spain) Joaquín Galera
1972	(Spain) José Antonio González Linares	(Spain) Francisco Galdós	(Spain) Domingo Perurena
1973	(Spain) Jesús Manzaneque	(Spain) Luis Ocaña	(Spain) Miguel María Lasa
1974	(Spain) Antonio Vallori	(Spain) Joaquím Pérez	(Spain) Juan Zurano
1975	(Spain) Andrés Gandarias	(Spain) José Casas	(Spain) Pedro Torres
1976	(Spain) Francisco Galdós	(Spain) Santiago Lazcano	(Spain) Pedro Torres
1977	(Spain) Francisco Galdós	(Spain) Enrique Cima	(Spain) Pedro Torres
1978	(Spain) Vicente Belda	(Spain) Pedro Torres	(Spain) Manuel Esparza
1979	(Spain) Salvador Jarque	(Spain) Pedro Torres	(Spain) Faustino Fernández
1980	(Spain) Eulalio García	(Spain) Pedro Torres	(West Germany) Klaus-Peter Thaler
1981	(Spain) Manuel Esparza	(Spain) Eulalio García	(Spain) José Luis López Cerrón
1982	(Spain) Marino Lejarreta	(Spain) Antonio Coll	(Spain) Guillermo de la Peña
1983	(Spain) José Luis Laguna	(Spain) Enrique Aja	(Spain) Bernardo Alfonsel
1985	(West Germany) Reimund Dietzen	(Spain) Jesús Rodríguez Magro	(Spain) Jesús Blanco Villar
1986	(West Germany) Reimund Dietzen	(Spain) Federico Echave	(Spain) Manuel Carrera
1987	(Spain) Jesús Blanco Villar	(Spain) Francisco Antequera	(Spain) Javier Lukin
1988	(Spain) Mariano Sánchez	(Spain) José Recio	(Soviet Union) Dimitri Zhdanov
1989	No race		
1990	(West Germany) Peter Hilse	(Spain) José Recio	(Spain) Fernando Martínez de Guereñu
1991–2002	No race		
2003	(Spain) Pedro Luis Marichalar	(Spain) Jesús Javier Ramírez	(Spain) Javier Ruiz de Larrinaga
2004	(Spain) Antonio López	(Spain) Iker Leonet	(Spain) Alberto Losada
2005	(Spain) Mikel Elgezabal	(Spain) Miguel Ángel Candil	(Spain) Manuel Jesús Jiménez
2006	(Spain) Francisco Gutiérrez	(Spain) Óscar Pujol	(Spain) David Gutiérrez Gutiérrez
2007	No race		
2008	(Spain) Ibon Zugasti	(Spain) Gorka Amuriza	(Spain) David Gutiérrez
2009	(Russia) Arkimedes Arguelyes	(Spain) Oriol Colome	(Spain) Ibon Zugasti
2010	(Argentina) Mauricio Muller	(Netherlands) Peter Van Dijk	(Spain) Vicente García
2011	(Spain) José Belda	(Spain) Borja Abásolo	(Spain) José Manuel Gutiérrez
2012	(Spain) Arkaitz Durán	(Spain) Josep Betalu	(France) Quentin Pacher
2013	(Spain) Antonio Pedrero	(Spain) Daniel López	(Spain) David Francisco Delgado
2014	(Spain) Imanol Estévez	(Spain) Juan Ignacio Pérez	(France) Jean-Luc Delpech
2015	(Spain) Jaime Rosón	(Spain) José Manuel Díaz Gallego	(Spain) Jorge Arcas
2016	(Chile) Elías Tello	(Spain) Josu Zabala	(Spain) Sergio Míguez
2017	(Panama) Christofer Jurado	(Costa Rica) Jason Huertas	(France) Cyril Barthe
2018	(Spain) Óscar González Brea	(Spain) Antonio Angulo	(Ecuador) Jefferson Cepeda
2019	(Spain) Kiko Galván	(Spain) Josu Etxebarria	(Spain) Daniel Mellado
2020	(Spain) Xabier Berasategi	(Spain) Pelayo Sánchez	(Spain) Javier Romo
2021	(Brazil) Vinícius Rangel	(Spain) Unai Iribar	(Spain) Vicente Hernáiz
2022	(Spain) Marcel Camprubí	(Spain) Julen Arriolabengoa	(Spain) Abel Balderstone
2023	(Spain) Daniel Cavia	(Uruguay) Guillermo Thomas Silva	(Spain) Alberto Álvarez
2024	(Spain) Héctor Álvarez	(New Zealand) Lachlan McNabb	(France) Jan Hernandez
