= Priego =

- Municipality
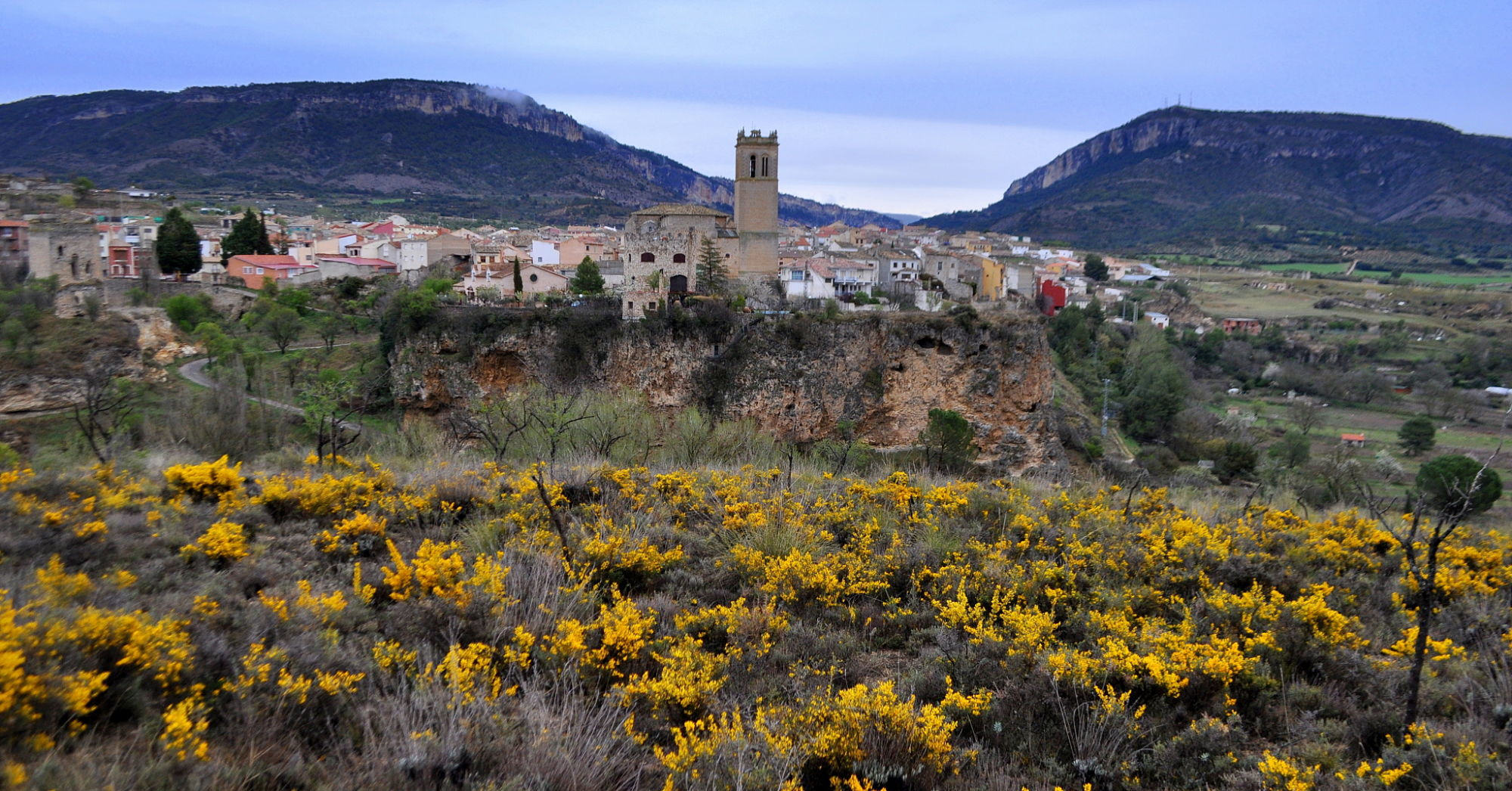
- View of Priego

- Coat of arms

- Location within Spain Location within Castilla-La Mancha
- Coordinates: 40°27′N 2°18′W
- Country: Spain
- Autonomous community: Castilla–La Mancha
- Province: Cuenca

Area
  - Total: 80 km^{2} (31 sq mi)

Population (2025-01-01)
  - Total: 912
  - Density: 11/km^{2} (30/sq mi)
- Time zone: UTC+1 (CET)
  - Summer (DST): UTC+2 (CEST)

Priego is a municipality located in the Cuenca Province, Castilla-La Mancha, Spain. According to the census 2004 (INE), the municipality has a population of 1,052 inhabitants.

== Notable people ==
- Luis Ocaña (9 June 1945 – 19 May 1994) was a Spanish road bicycle racer who won the 1973 Tour de France and the 1970 Vuelta a España.
