= 1975 Tour de Romandie =

Race details
- Dates: 6–11 May 1975
- Stages: 4
- Distance: 894.6 km (555.9 mi)
- Winning time: 23h 48' 10"

Results
	Winner	Francisco Galdós (ESP)
	Second	Josef Fuchs (SUI)
	Third	Knut Knudsen (NOR)

The 1975 Tour de Romandie was the 29th edition of the Tour de Romandie cycle race and was held from 6 May to 11 May 1975. The race started in Geneva and finished in Lancy. The race was won by Francisco Galdós.

== General classification ==
Final general classification
Rank	Rider	Time
1	Francisco Galdós (ESP) 23h 48' 10"	1945
2	Josef Fuchs (SUI)	+ 20"
3	Knut Knudsen (NOR)	+ 1' 57"
4	Wilfried David (BEL)	+ 2' 05"
5	Georges Talbourdet (FRA)	+ 2' 30"
6	Jos Deschoenmaecker (BEL)	+ 2' 31"
7	Christian Seznec (FRA)	+ 2' 47"
8	Giancarlo Bellini (ITA)	+ 3' 09"
9	Enrico Paolini (ITA)	+ 4' 31"
10	Michel Périn (FRA)	+ 5' 09"
