= Bernard Croyet =

French cyclist

Personal information
- Born: 8 July 1948 (age 78)

Cycling career
- Sport: Cycling
- Role: Rider

Bernard Croyet (born 8 July 1948) is a French racing cyclist. He rode in the 1974 Tour de France, and won Stage 2 of the 1974 Critérium du Dauphiné Libéré.
