= Domingo Perurena =

Spanish cyclist (1943–2023)

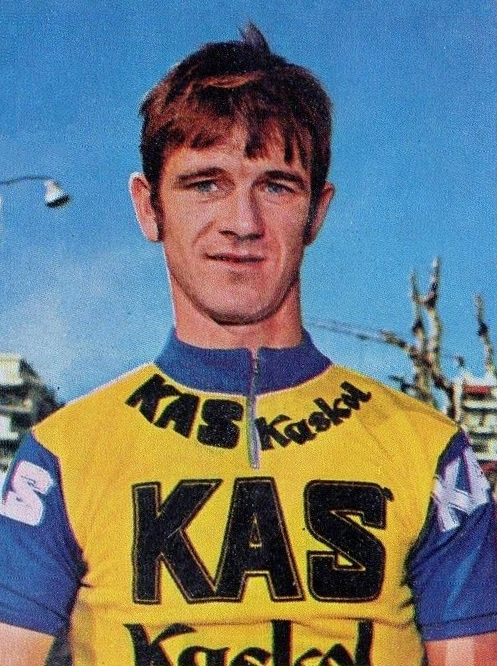
- Perurena, c. 1973

Personal information
- Full name: Domingo Perurena Telletxea
- Nickname: Txomin
- Born: 15 December 1943 Oiartzun, Spain
- Died: 8 June 2023 (aged 79) San Sebastián

Cycling career
- Sport: Cycling
- Discipline: Road
- Role: Rider
- Rider type: Climber specialist Sprinter

Amateur teams
- 1962: Nuarbe
- 1963–1964: Olarra

Professional teams
- 1965: Mobylette GAC
- 1966–1969: Fagor
- 1970–1978: Kas–Kaskol
- 1979: Teka

Managerial teams
- 1980–1982: Teka
- 1984–1991: Orbea–Danena
- 1992: Festina–Lotus
- 1994–1997: Euskadi–Petronor

Major wins
- Grand Tours Tour de France Mountains classification (1974) Giro d'Italia 2 individual stages (1971, 1975) Vuelta a España Points Classification (1972, 1974) 12 individual stages (1966–1969, 1972–1975, 1978) Stage races Volta a Catalunya (1973) Volta a la Comunitat Valenciana (1973) Setmana Catalana de Ciclisme (1967) One-day races and Classics National Road Race Championships (1973, 1975)
Medal record
Representing Spain
World Championships
| Silver medal – second place | 1965 San Sebastián | Team time trial |

Domingo Perurena Telletxea or Txomin Perurena (15 December 1943 – 8 June 2023) was a Spanish professional road racing cyclist. He was most famous for winning the overall mountains classification of 1974 Tour de France. He also finished second at the 1975 Vuelta a España and won a total of 12 stages in this race. With 158 professional wins he is the winningest Spanish rider in the sport's history

Perurena died on 8 June 2023, at the age of 79.

== Major results ==
1965
1st Vuelta a Cantabria
2nd Team time trial, UCI Road World Championships
9th Overall Tour de l'Avenir

1st Stage 8

1966
1st Subida al Naranco
1st Stage 18 Vuelta a España
2nd GP Pascuas
5th Overall Vuelta a Andalucía
9th Overall Euskal Bizikleta

1st Stage 4

1967
1st Overall Setmana Catalana de Ciclisme

1st Stages 3 & 5

1st Trofeo Juan Fina
1st Stage 2 Vuelta a España
Volta a la Comunitat Valenciana

1st Stages 4 & 7

3rd Trofeo Masferrer
4th Overall Euskal Bizikleta

1st Stage 3

7th Gran Premio Fedrácion Catalana de Ciclismo
1968
1st GP Pascuas
1st Trofeo Juan Fina
1st Barcelona-Andorra
1st Stage 10 Vuelta a España
1st Stage 3 Volta a Catalunya
1st Stage 2 Euskal Bizikleta
1st Stage 3 Vuelta Ciclista a La Rioja
7th Overall Setmana Catalana de Ciclisme

1st Stage 6

1969
1st GP Pascuas
1st Clásica de Sabiñánigo
1st Stage 4 Vuelta a España
Vuelta Ciclista a La Rioja

1st Stages 2 & 3b

1st Stage 7 Volta a la Comunitat Valenciana
9th Overall Tour of the Basque Country

1st Stage 5b (ITT)

1970
1st Trofeo Elola
1st Stage 5 Volta a la Comunitat Valenciana
1st Stage 2 Tour de Picardie
1st Stage 2a Vuelta Ciclista a La Rioja
2nd Clásica de Sabiñánigo
3rd GP Pascuas
5th Overall Tour of the Basque Country

1st Stage 4

10th Overall Vuelta a los Valles Mineros
1971
1st GP Pascuas
1st Klasika Primavera
1st GP Villafranca de Ordizia
1st Trofeo Masferrer
1st Stage 6 Giro d'Italia
1st Stage 4 Volta a la Comunitat Valenciana
1st Stage 3 Vuelta a Mallorca
2nd Grand Prix de Valence
2nd Clásica de Sabiñánigo
3rd Overall Volta a Catalunya

1st Stages 1 & 2

3rd Road race, National Road Championships
3rd Druivenkoers Overijse
4th Overall Vuelta a Cantabria

1st Stages 1a, 1b, 4 & 6

1972
1st Overall Volta a la Comunitat Valenciana

1st Stage 3

1st Overall GP Leganes
1st GP Villafranca de Ordizia
Tour of the Basque Country

1st Stages 4 & 5

Vuelta a Asturias

1st Stages 2, 3 & 5a

1st Stage 2b Vuelta a los Valles Mineros
1st Stage 3 Tour de la Nouvelle France
2nd Grand Prix de Valence
2nd Road race, National Road Championships
3rd Overall Vuelta a Cantabria

1st Stages 1a, 3 & 5

5th Overall Volta a Catalunya

1st Stages 1, 2a & 3

6th Overall Vuelta a España

1st Points classification
1st Stages 3 & 10

7th Milan–San Remo
10th Overall Vuelta a Andalucía

1st Stages 4 & 5

1973
1st Road race, National Road Championships
1st Overall Volta a Catalunya

1st Stages 1 & 5

1st Trofeo Elola
1st GP Navarra
1st Stage 13 Vuelta a España
1st Stage 7 Tour de Suisse
Vuelta a Mallorca

1st Stages 2 & 3

1st Stage 5 Volta a la Comunitat Valenciana
1st Stage 1 Vuelta a Cantabria
2nd Grand Prix de Valence
3rd Overall Tour of the Basque Country

1st Stages 3 & 5

3rd Overall GP Leganes
9th Overall Vuelta a Andalucía
1974
1st GP Pascuas
1st Trofeo Masferrer
1st Stage 4 Vuelta a Aragón
1st Stage 1a Critérium du Dauphiné Libéré
1st Stage 2a Vuelta a Asturias
1st Mountains classification Tour de France
2nd Klasika Primavera
2nd GP Navarra
3rd Overall Volta a Catalunya

1st Stages 1 & 3a

4th Overall Tour of the Basque Country

1st Stages 1, 2, 3 & 4a

5th Overall Vuelta a España

1st Points classification
1st Stages 5 & 7

8th Road race, UCI Road World Championships
1975
1st Road race, National Road Championships
1st Trofeo Masferrer
1st Clásica de Sabiñánigo
1st Stage 7a Giro d'Italia
Vuelta a Cantabria

1st Stages 3a & 4

1st Stage 4 Volta a la Comunitat Valenciana
1st Stage 5 Ronde van Nederland
1st Stage 3 GP Leganes
2nd Overall Vuelta a España

1st Stage 13

2nd GP Pascuas
3rd GP Navarra
5th Overall Volta a Catalunya

1st Prologue & Stages 1a & 6

5th Overall Vuelta a Andalucía

1st Stages 2 & 3

7th Overall Setmana Catalana de Ciclisme

1st Stage 5

1976
1st Overall GP Leganes
1st GP Pascuas
1st GP Villafranca de Ordizia
1st Trofeo Elola
1st Stage 4 Tour of the Basque Country
1st Stage 1 Volta a la Comunitat Valenciana
1st Stage 2a Vuelta a Cantabria
3rd Overall Vuelta a Asturias

1st Stages 3 & 6a

8th Overall Volta a Catalunya
1977
1st Grand Prix de Valence
2nd Overall Vuelta Ciclista a La Rioja
3rd Overall Vuelta a Andalucía
4th Overall Vuelta a España
5th Road race, UCI Road World Championships
5th GP Navarra
6th GP Pascuas
6th GP Leganes
7th Overall Vuelta a Asturias
8th Overall Volta a la Comunitat Valenciana

1st Stage 3

1978
1st GP Pascuas
1st Klasika Primavera
Vuelta a España

1st Stages 7 & 19a

2nd Grand Prix de Valence
8th Overall Costa del Azahar

== Team management ==
He was a directeur sportif in Teka, Orbea, Caja Rural, Paternina, Artiach, Lotus and Euskadi. Riders under his direction included Alberto Fernández, Marino Lejarreta, Federico Echave, Mathieu Hermans, Peio Ruiz Cabestany, Pedro Delgado, Sean Kelly and Roberto Laiseka.
