= 1978 Tour of the Basque Country =

Race details
- Dates: 3–7 April 1978
- Stages: 5
- Distance: 811 km (504 mi)
- Winning time: 22h 36' 33"

Results
| | Winner | José Antonio González Linares (ESP) | (Kas–Campagnolo) |
| | Second | José Enrique Cima (ESP) | (Kas–Campagnolo) |
| | Third | José Nazabal (ESP) | (Kas–Campagnolo) |

The 1978 Tour of the Basque Country was the 18th edition of the Tour of the Basque Country cycle race and was held from 3 April to 7 April 1978. The race started in Leitza and finished at the Alto de Uncella. The race was won by José Antonio González Linares of the Kas team.

== General classification ==
Final general classification

| Rank | Rider | Team | Time |
|---|---|---|---|
| 1 | José Antonio González Linares (ESP) | Kas–Campagnolo | 22h 36' 33" |
| 2 | José Enrique Cima (ESP) | Kas–Campagnolo | + 5' 24" |
| 3 | José Nazabal (ESP) | Kas–Campagnolo | + 5' 26" |
| 4 | Enrique Martínez Heredia (ESP) | Kas–Campagnolo | + 5' 29" |
| 5 | Vicente Belda (ESP) | Transmallorca | + 5' 32" |
| 6 | José Viejo (ESP) | Kas–Campagnolo | + 5' 42" |
| 7 | Gonzalo Aja (ESP) | Novostil–Helios | + 6' 15" |
| 8 | Miguel María Lasa (ESP) | Teka | + 6' 25" |
| 9 | Firmino Bernardino (POR) | Coelima | + 6' 40" |
| 10 | Alberto Fernández (ESP) | Novostil–Helios | + 6' 50" |
