= 1976 Tour of the Basque Country =

Race details
- Dates: 5–9 April 1976
- Stages: 5
- Distance: 763.5 km (474.4 mi)
- Winning time: 21h 19' 49"

Results
	Winner	Gianbattista Baronchelli (ITA)	(Scic)
	Second	Francisco Elorriaga (ESP)	(Super Ser)
	Third	Joaquim Agostinho (POR)	(Teka)

The 1976 Tour of the Basque Country was the 16th edition of the Tour of the Basque Country cycle race and was held from 5 April to 9 April 1976. The race started in Iratxe and finished at the Alt de San Martzial in Irun. The race was won by Gianbattista Baronchelli of the Scic team.

== General classification ==
Final general classification

Rank	Rider	Team	Time
1	Gianbattista Baronchelli (ITA)	Scic	21h 19' 49"
2	Francisco Elorriaga (ESP)	Super Ser	+ 1' 05"
3	Joaquim Agostinho (POR)	Teka	+ 1' 15"
4	José Enrique Cima (ESP)	Novostil–Transmallorca	+ 1' 25"
5	Miguel María Lasa (ESP)	Scic	+ 1' 26"
6	José Nazabal (ESP)	Kas–Campagnolo	+ 2' 01"
7	Pedro Torres (ESP)	Super Ser	+ 3' 21"
8	Wladimiro Panizza (ITA)	Scic	+ 3' 27"
9	Luis Ocaña (ESP)	Super Ser	+ 4' 21"
10	Walter Riccomi (ITA)	Scic	+ 4' 30"
