= Gorafe =

- Municipality
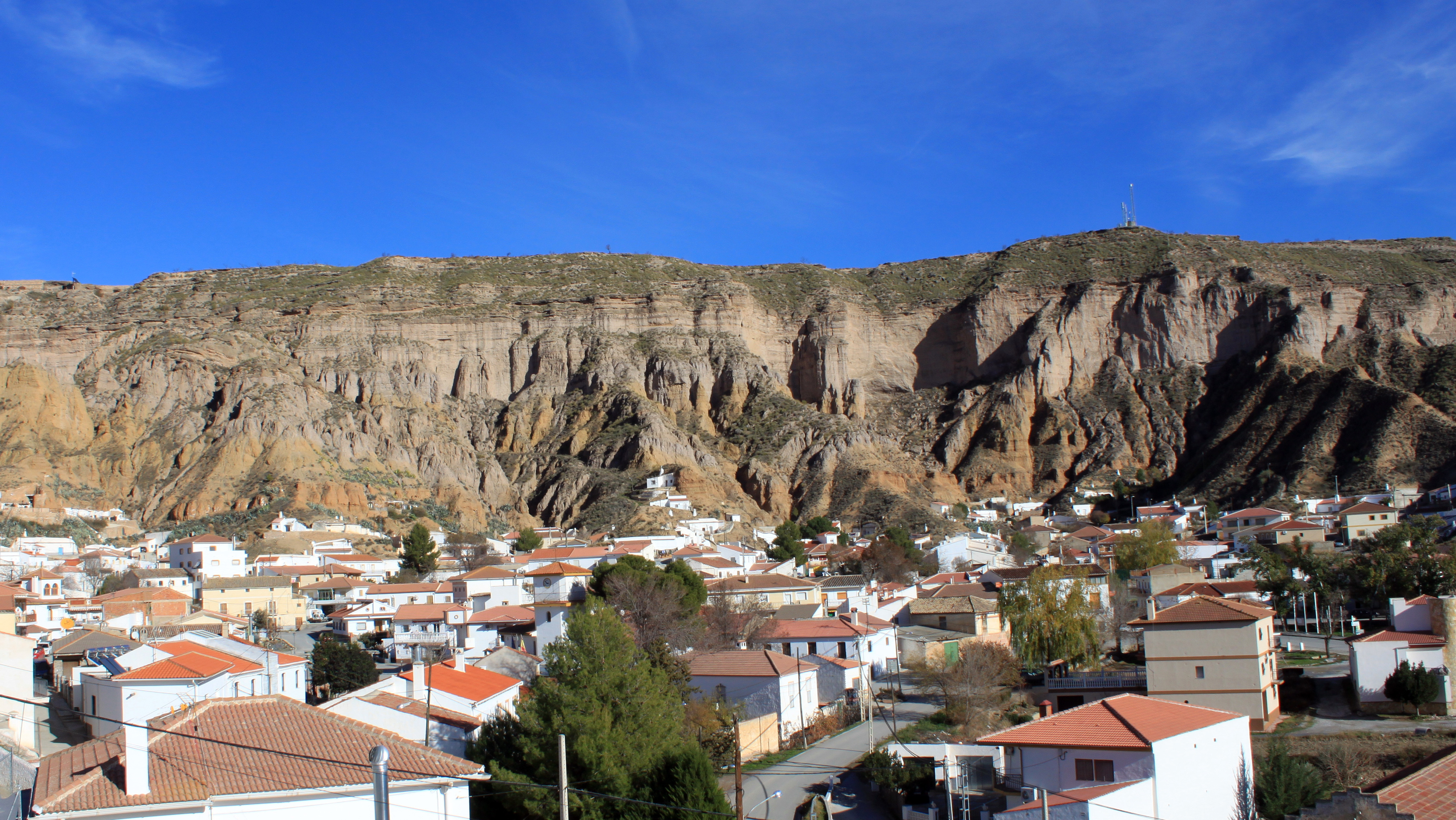

- Flag Coat of arms

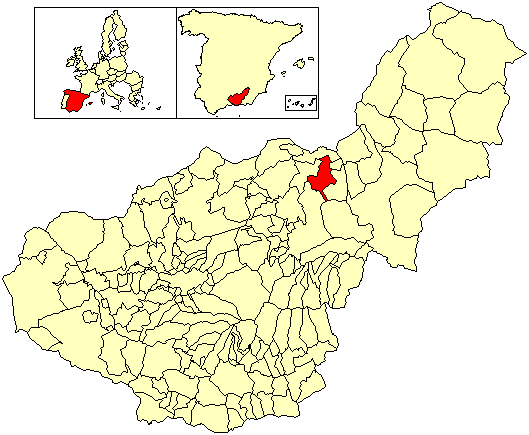

- Location in Spain
- Coordinates: 37°29′N 3°02′W
- Country: Spain
- Autonomous community: Andalusia
- Province: Granada

Area
  - Total: 77 km^{2} (30 sq mi)
- Elevation: 850 m (2,790 ft)

Population (2025-01-01)
  - Total: 368
  - Density: 4.8/km^{2} (12/sq mi)
- Time zone: UTC+1 (CET)
  - Summer (DST): UTC+2 (CEST)
- Website: www.gorafe.es

Gorafe is a municipality in the province of Granada, Spain. As of 2010, it has a population of 474 inhabitants. It has interesting megalithic structures in the area of unknown origin.

== See also ==
- List of municipalities in Granada
