= Lago delle Nazioni =

Lake in Italy

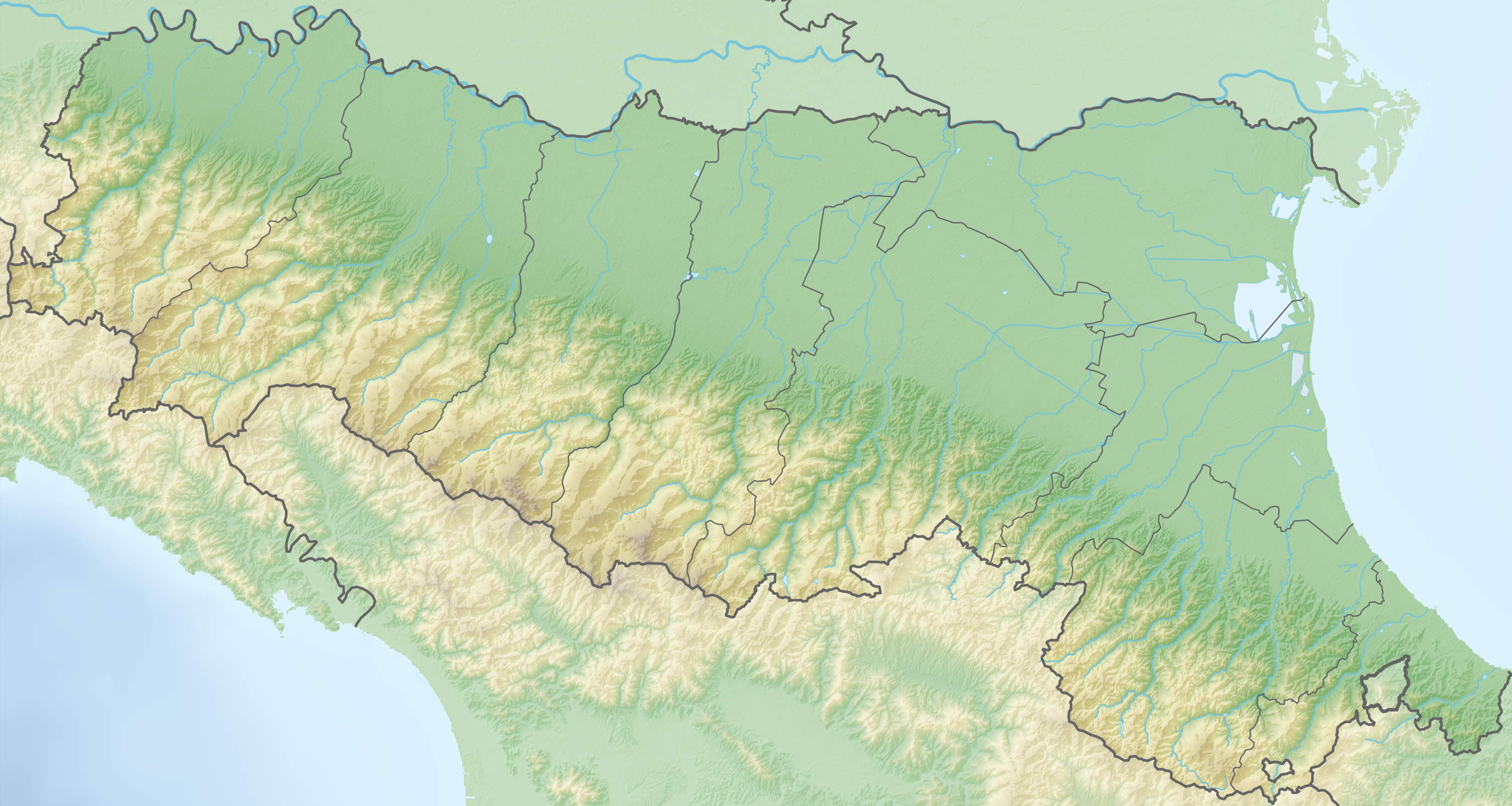
- Location within Emilia-Romagna
- Location: Province of Ferrara, Emilia-Romagna
- Coordinates: 44.769649°N 12.241774°E
- Primary inflows: Po
- Primary outflows: none
- Basin countries: Italy
- Surface area: 0.9 km^{2} (0.35 sq mi)
- Surface elevation: 2 m (6 ft 7 in)

Lago delle Nazioni (Nations' lake) is an artificial lagoon created alongside the Nations' Resort (Italian: Lido delle Nazioni) in Comacchio, Italy.
