= 1974 Volta a Catalunya =

Race details
- Dates: 4–11 September 1974
- Stages: 7 + Prologue
- Distance: 1,212.9 km (753.7 mi)
- Winning time: 34h 32' 51"

Results
	Winner	Bernard Thévenet (FRA)
	Second	Andrés Oliva (ESP)
	Third	Domingo Perurena (ESP)

The 1974 Volta a Catalunya was the 54th edition of the Volta a Catalunya cycle race and was held from 4 September to 11 September 1974. The race started in Lleida and finished in Manresa. The race was won by Bernard Thévenet.

== General classification ==
Final general classification

Rank	Rider	Time
1	Bernard Thévenet (FRA)	34h 32' 51"
2	Andrés Oliva (ESP)	+ 1' 00"
3	Domingo Perurena (ESP)	+ 1' 12"
4	Gösta Pettersson (SWE)	+ 2' 14"
5	José Martins (POR)	+ 2' 37"
6	Ventura Díaz (ESP)	+ 3' 02"
7	Hennie Kuiper (NED)	+ 3' 56"
8	José Pesarrodona (ESP)	+ 4' 13"
9	Mauro Vannucchi (ITA)	+ 4' 33"
10	Luis Ocaña (ESP)	+ 6' 46"
