= Setmana Catalana de Ciclisme =

Defunct cycling race in Spain

Race details
- Date: March
- Region: Catalonia, Spain
- English name: Catalan Cycling Week
- Local name: Semana Catalana de Ciclismo (in Spanish) Setmana Catalana de Ciclisme (in Catalan)
- Discipline: Road
- Competition: UCI Europe Tour
- Type: Stage-race

History
- First edition: 1963
- Editions: 42
- Final edition: 2005
- First winner: José Pérez Francés (ESP)
- Most wins: José Pérez-Francés (ESP); Luis Ocaña (ESP); Eddy Merckx (BEL); Alex Zülle (SUI); Michael Boogerd (NED); Laurent Jalabert (FRA) :2 times
- Final winner: Alberto Contador (ESP)

The Catalan Cycling Week (Setmana Catalana de Ciclisme in Catalan) was a multi-stage road bicycle race held in Catalonia, Spain. Held annually from 1963 until 2005, it was run as a 2.HC race on the UCI Europe Tour in the second half of March. The Setmana Catalana was discontinued in 2006 due to financial problems and is no longer on the UCI Calendar. Since 2010, the Volta a Catalunya, Catalonia's oldest existing cycling race, was moved to the calendar slot formerly held by the Setmana Catalana in late March.

The first winner of the race was José Pérez-Francés in 1963. Six riders have won the race twice: Spaniards José Pérez-Francés and Luis Ocaña, Belgian Eddy Merckx, Swiss Alex Zülle, Dutchman Michael Boogerd and Frenchman Laurent Jalabert. Alberto Contador was the last to win in 2005.

== Winners ==
| Year | Country | Rider | Team |
|---|---|---|---|
| 1963 | Spain | José Pérez-Francés | |
| 1964 | Spain | José Pérez-Francés | |
| 1965 | Spain | José Luis Talamillo | |
| 1966 | Spain | José López Rodríguez | |
| 1967 | Spain | Domingo Perurena | |
| 1968 | Spain | Mariano Díaz | |
| 1969 | Spain | Luis Ocaña | |
| 1970 | Italy | Italo Zilioli | |
| 1971 | France | Raymond Poulidor | |
| 1972 | Spain | Miguel María Lasa | |
| 1973 | Spain | Luis Ocaña | |
| 1974 | Netherlands | Joop Zoetemelk | |
| 1975 | Belgium | Eddy Merckx | |
| 1976 | Belgium | Eddy Merckx | |
| 1977 | Belgium | Freddy Maertens | |
| 1978 | Spain | Enrique Cima | |
| 1979 | Belgium | Claude Criquielion | |
| 1980 | No race | | |
| 1981 | Sweden | Sven-Åke Nilsson | |
| 1982 | Norway | Jostein Wilmann | |
| 1983 | Spain | Alberto Fernández | |
| 1984 | Australia | Phil Anderson | |
| 1985 | Spain | Josep Recio | |
| 1986 | Spain | Felipe Yañez | |
| 1987 | Spain | Vicent Belda | |
| 1988 | Ireland | Sean Kelly | |
| 1989 | Germany | Raimund Dietzen | |
| 1990 | Spain | Iñaki Gastón | |
| 1991 | Ireland | Stephen Roche | |
| 1992 | Switzerland | Alex Zülle | |
| 1993 | Spain | Pedro Delgado | |
| 1994 | Italy | Stefano Della Santa | |
| 1995 | Italy | Francesco Frattini | |
| 1996 | Switzerland | Alex Zülle | |
| 1997 | Spain | Juan Carlos Domínguez | |
| 1998 | Netherlands | Michael Boogerd | |
| 1999 | France | Laurent Jalabert | |
| 2000 | France | Laurent Jalabert | |
| 2001 | Netherlands | Michael Boogerd | |
| 2002 | Spain | Juan Miguel Mercado | |
| 2003 | Italy | Dario Frigo | |
| 2004 | Spain | Joaquim Rodríguez | |
| 2005 | Spain | Alberto Contador | |
