= Vuelta a La Rioja =

Spanish cycling race

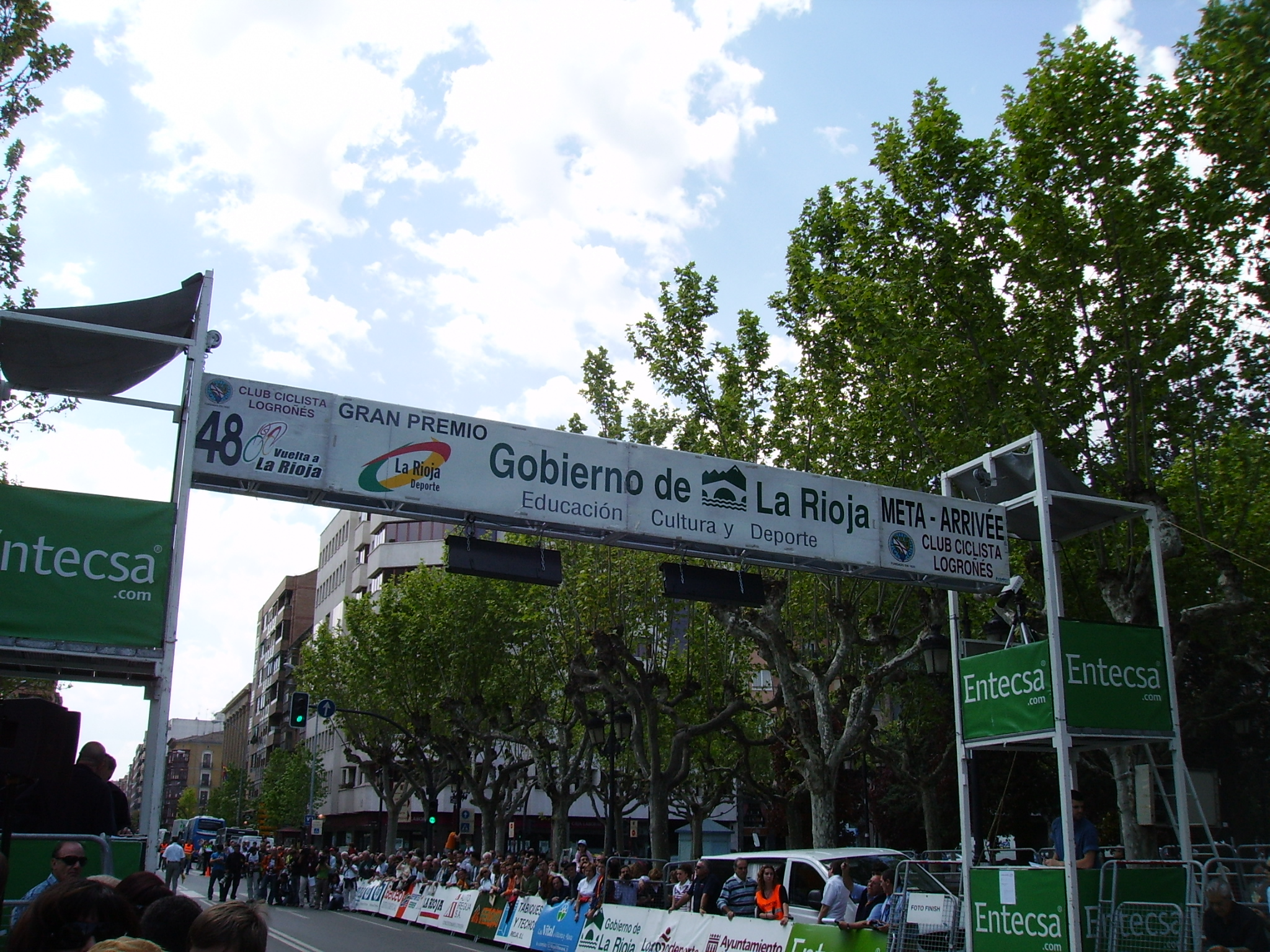
- The end of the 48th Tour of La Rioja.

Race details
- Date: Late-April
- Region: La Rioja, Spain
- English name: Tour of La Rioja
- Local name: Vuelta a La Rioja (in Spanish)
- Discipline: Road
- Competition: UCI Europe Tour
- Type: Stage-race (until 2008); One-day race (from 2009)
- Organiser: Club Ciclista Logroñés
- Web site: www.vueltaciclistalarioja.com

History
- First edition: 1957
- Editions: 57 (as of 2017)
- First winner: Alberto Sant (ESP)
- Most wins: Jesús Manzaneque (ESP); Carlos Echeverría (ESP) (3 wins)
- Most recent: Rory Sutherland (AUS)

The Vuelta a La Rioja (English: Tour of La Rioja) was a regional Spanish road bicycle race held in La Rioja by the Club Ciclista Logroñes from 1957 to 2017 with 57 editions, skipping three. It ended due to financial problems of the cycling club. Its end was only announced in 2019. From 2005 to 2008, it was a 2.1 category race on the UCI Europe Tour.

== Route ==
The majority of the times the route went from Logroño to Logroño, passing sometimes through Navarra, Soria and Álava.

The first edition's route was Logroño-Soria-Logroño-Cervera-Logroño-Vitoria-Logroño. The last edition's route was Logroño-Santo Domingo de la Calzada-Logroño.

== History ==
The competition was started by Club Ciclista Logroñes members Francisco San Román, Alberto Ducros, Félix Grau, Ricardo Rubio and Jesús García. They were not involved in the 2nd Vuelta a La Rioja.

The Club continued organizing the race until its end.

== Suspension and end ==
Its end was never officially announced. In 2018, due to economic unviability, the edition was suspended. In 2019, the Vuelta was postponed sine die, and the Club declared the end of the Vuelta a La Rioja.

== Winners ==
Every winner of the race was Spanish until West German Reimund Dietzen won the 1987 edition. Only 9 more foreigners won the race after him. The last 6 editions were all won by foreigners.

Every cyclist team was Spanish until 2003, when Félix Cárdenas won the race with Colombian team Orbitel 2005. They were followed by Russian team Lokosphinx in 2012 and Orica-GreenEDGE from 2014 to 2017.

Year	Country	Rider	Team
1957	Spain	Alberto Sant	Mobylette Coabania
1958	Spain	Manuel Martín Piñera	KAS–Boxing Club
1959	No race		
1960	Spain	Ángel Rodríguez	Brandy Majestad
1961	No race		
1962	Spain	Carlos Echeverría	Funcor–Munguia
1963	Spain	Carlos Echeverría	KAS–Kaskol
1964	Spain	Antonio Barrutia	KAS–Kaskol
1965	Spain	Juan María Uribezubia	KAS–Kaskol
1966	Spain	Antonio Gómez del Moral	KAS–Kaskol
1967	Spain	Gabino Erenozaga	Fagor
1968	Spain	Ramón Mendiburu	Fagor–Fargas
1969	Spain	Luis Ocaña	Fagor
1970	Spain	Carlos Echeverría	KAS–Kaskol
1971	Spain	Jesús Manzaneque	KAS–Kaskol
1972	Spain	José Antonio Pontón	Werner
1973	Spain	Jesús Manzaneque	La Casera–Peña Bahamontes
1974	Spain	Jesús Manzaneque	La Casera–Peña Bahamontes
1975	Spain	Francisco Elorriaga	KAS–Kaskol
1976	No race		
1977	Spain	Rafael Ladron De Guevara	KAS–Campagnolo
1978	Spain	Francisco Galdós	KAS–Campagnolo
1979	Spain	Eulalio García	Teka
1980	Spain	Jesús Suárez Cueva	Fosforera–Vereco
1981	Spain	Isidro Juárez	Zor–Helios
1982	Spain	Marino Lejarreta	Teka
1983	Spain	Eduardo Chozas	Zor–Gemeaz–Cusin
1984	Spain	Iñaki Gastón	Reynolds
1985	Spain	Francisco Antequera	Zor–Gemeaz
1986	Spain	José Luis Laguía	Reynolds
1987	West Germany	Reimund Dietzen	Teka
1988	Spain	Federico Echave	B.H. Sport
1989	Spain	Enrique Aja	Teka
1990	Spain	Alfonso Gutiérrez	B.H.–Amaya Seguros
1991	No race		
1992	Spain	Mikel Zarrabeitia	Amaya Seguros
1993	France	Laurent Jalabert	ONCE
1994	Spain	José María Jiménez	Banesto
1995	Spain	Miguel Induráin	Banesto
1996	Spain	José Roberto Sierra	ONCE
1997	Spain	José María Jiménez	Banesto
1998	Spain	Abraham Olano	Banesto
1999	Spain	Juan Carlos Domínguez	Vitalicio Seguros–Grupo Generali
2000	Spain	Miguel Ángel Martín Perdiguero	Vitalicio Seguros–Grupo Generali
2001	Spain	César Solaun	iBanesto.com
2002	Spain	Carlos Torrent	Jazztel–Costa de Almería
2003	Colombia	Félix Cárdenas	Orbitel 2005
2004	Russia	Vladimir Karpets	Illes Balears–Banesto
2005	Spain	Javier Pascual Rodríguez	Comunidad Valenciana–Elche
2006	Spain	Ricardo Serrano	Kaiku
2007	Spain	Rubén Plaza	Caisse d'Epargne
2008	Spain	Manuel Calvente	Contentpolis–Murcia
2009	Spain	David García	Xacobeo–Galicia
2010	Spain	Ángel Vicioso	Andalucía–Cajasur
2011	Spain	Imanol Erviti	Movistar Team
2012	Russia	Evgeny Shalunov	Lokosphinx
2013	Italy	Francesco Lasca	Caja Rural–Seguros RGA
2014	Australia	Michael Matthews	Orica–GreenEDGE
2015	Australia	Caleb Ewan	Orica–GreenEDGE
2016	Australia	Michael Matthews	Orica–GreenEDGE
2017	Australia	Rory Sutherland	Movistar Team
