= José Antonio González (cyclist) =

Spanish cyclist

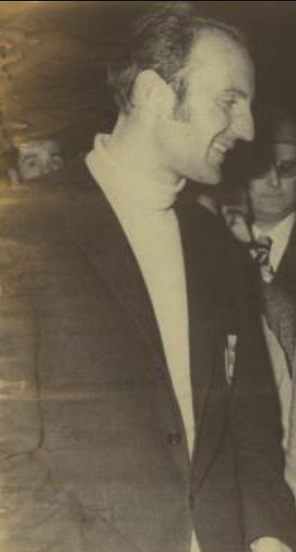

Personal information
- Full name: José Antonio González Linares
- Born: 25 February 1946 (age 80) San Felices de Buelna, Spain

Cycling career
- Sport: Cycling
- Current team: Retired
- Discipline: Road
- Role: Rider

Professional teams
- 1969–1975: Kas–Kaskol
- 1976–1978: Kas–Campagnolo
- 1979: Teka

Major wins
- Spain Road Race Championship (1970); Tour de France, 1 stage Vuelta a España, 3 stages Tour of the Basque Country (1972,1975,1977,1978)

José Antonio González Linares (Note: In this Spanish name, the first or paternal surname is González and the second or maternal family name is Linares.) (born 25 February 1946 in San Felices de Buelna) is a Spanish former road bicycle racer. He competed in the team time trial at the 1968 Summer Olympics.

== Major results ==
1967
Vuelta Ciclista a Navarra
1970
GP Ciudad de Vitoria
GP Nuestra Senora de Oro
(Spain) Spanish National Road Race Championship
Tour de France:

Winner stage 7B

1971
Vuelta a España:

Winner stage 11B

1972
Vuelta a España:

Winner stage 17B

Tour of the Basque Country
1973
Vuelta a Levante
1975
Tour of the Basque Country
1976
Larado
Madrid
Vuelta a España:

Winner stage 10

1977
GP Pascuas
Tour of the Basque Country
1978
Tour of the Basque Country
