= Jesús Manzaneque =

Spanish cyclist

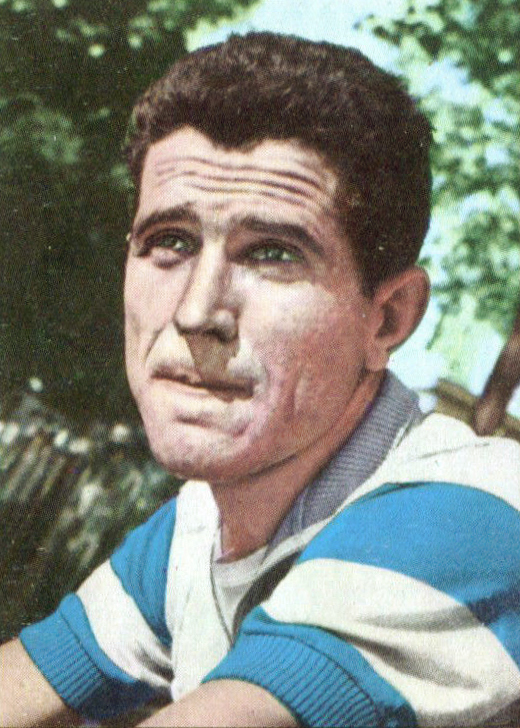
- Manzaneque c. 1971

Personal information
- Full name: Jesús Manzaneque Sánchez
- Born: 1 January 1943 (age 83) Campo de Criptana, Spain

Cycling career
- Sport: Cycling
- Current team: Retired
- Discipline: Road
- Role: Rider

Professional teams
- 1966: Olimpia
- 1967: Ferrys
- 1968–1969: La Casera-Peña Bahamontes
- 1970: Werner
- 1971–1972: KAS-Kaskol
- 1973–1974: La Casera-Peña Bahamontes
- 1975: Monteverde-Sanson
- 1976: Super Ser
- 1977: Magniflex-Torpado
- 1977: A.D.S.-Guerciotti
- 1978: Novostil-Helios
- 1979: CR Colchon-Atun Tam
- 1980: Peña Hermanas Manzaneque

Major wins
- Vuelta a España, 2 stages Volta a Portugal (1973)

Jesús Manzaneque Sánchez (born 1 January 1943) is a Spanish former road racing cyclist. He is the younger brother of Fernando Manzaneque.

== Palmarès ==
1969
Trofeo Elola
1971
Vuelta a La Rioja
1972
1st, Stage 9b, Vuelta a España
1973
Volta a Portugal
Vuelta a La Rioja
1974
Vuelta a La Rioja
Trofeo Elola
1975
Trofeo Elola
1st, Stage 19b, Vuelta a España
1st, Stage 4, Vuelta a Andalucía
