= 1975 Vuelta a España, Prologue to Stage 10 =

Cycling race stages

The 1975 Vuelta a España was the 30th edition of the Vuelta a España, one of cycling's Grand Tours. The Vuelta began in Fuengirola, with a prologue individual time trial on 22 April, and Stage 10 occurred on 2 May with a stage to Cambrils. The race finished in San Sebastián on 11 May.

== Prologue ==
22 April 1975 - Fuengirola to Fuengirola, 4.4 km (2.7 mi) (ITT)

Prologue result and general classification after Prologue

Rank	Rider	Team	Time
1	Roger Swerts (BEL)	IJsboerke–Colner	5' 29"
2	Jesús Manzaneque (ESP)	Monteverde	+ 3"
3	José Martins (POR)	Coelima	+ 6"
4	Juan Manuel Santisteban (ESP)	Kas–Kaskol	+ 7"
5	José Luis Viejo (ESP)	Super Ser	s.t.
6	José Pesarrodona (ESP)	Kas–Kaskol	+ 10"
7	José Madeira (POR)	Sporting Lisboa-Benfica	s.t.
8	Fernando Mendes (POR)	Sporting Lisboa-Benfica	s.t.
9	Wilmo Francioni (ITA)	Magniflex	s.t.
10	Joaquim Andrade (POR)	Coelima	+ 11"

== Stage 1 ==
23 April 1975 - Marbella to Marbella, 78 km (48.5 mi)

Stage 1 result

Rank	Rider	Team	Time
1	Wilfried Wesemael (BEL)	Alsaver–Jeunet–de Gribaldy	1h 59' 39"
2	Albert Hulzebosch (NED)	Frisol–G.B.C.	+ 4"
3	Miguel María Lasa (ESP)	Kas–Kaskol	s.t.
4	Marino Basso (ITA)	Magniflex	s.t.
5	Eddy Peelman (BEL)	Super Ser	s.t.
6	Henk Poppe (NED)	Frisol–G.B.C.	s.t.
7	Theo Smit (NED)	Frisol–G.B.C.	s.t.
8	Raymond Steegmans (BEL)	IJsboerke–Colner	s.t.
9	Ronny Vanmarcke (BEL)	Alsaver–Jeunet–de Gribaldy	s.t.
10	Roger Loysch (BEL)	Alsaver–Jeunet–de Gribaldy	s.t.

General classification after Stage 1

Rank	Rider	Team	Time
1	Roger Swerts (BEL)	IJsboerke–Colner	1h 58' 18"
2	Jesús Manzaneque (ESP)	Monteverde	+ 3"
3	José Martins (POR)	Coelima	+ 6"
4	Juan Manuel Santisteban (ESP)	Kas–Kaskol	+ 7"
5	José Luis Viejo (ESP)	Super Ser	s.t.
6	Wilmo Francioni (ITA)	Magniflex	+ 10"
7	Fernando Mendes (POR)	Sporting Lisboa-Benfica	s.t.
8	José Madeira (POR)	Sporting Lisboa-Benfica	s.t.
9	José Pesarrodona (ESP)	Kas–Kaskol	s.t.
10	Wilfried Wesemael (BEL)	Alsaver–Jeunet–de Gribaldy	+ 11"

== Stage 2 ==
24 April 1975 - Málaga to Granada, 143 km (88.9 mi)

Stage 2 result

Rank	Rider	Team	Time
1	Miguel María Lasa (ESP)	Kas–Kaskol	4h 04' 00"
2	Domingo Perurena (ESP)	Kas–Kaskol	+ 5"
3	José Luis Viejo (ESP)	Super Ser	+ 15"
4	Hennie Kuiper (NED)	Frisol–G.B.C.	+ 18"
5	Manuel Rego (POR)	Coelima	s.t.
6	José Luis Abilleira (ESP)	Monteverde	s.t.
7	José Martins (POR)	Coelima	s.t.
8	Jesús Manzaneque (ESP)	Monteverde	s.t.
9	Andrés Oliva (ESP)	Kas–Kaskol	s.t.
10	Pedro Torres (ESP)	Super Ser	s.t.

General classification after Stage 2

Rank	Rider	Team	Time
1	Miguel María Lasa (ESP)	Kas–Kaskol	6h 02' 30"
2	Roger Swerts (BEL)	IJsboerke–Colner	+ 6"
3	Jesús Manzaneque (ESP)	Monteverde	+ 9"
4	José Luis Viejo (ESP)	Super Ser	+ 10"
5	José Martins (POR)	Coelima	+ 12"
6	Domingo Perurena (ESP)	Kas–Kaskol	s.t.
7	Pedro Torres (ESP)	Super Ser	+ 19"
8	Fernando Mendes (POR)	Sporting Lisboa-Benfica	+ 21"
9	Wilfried Wesemael (BEL)	Alsaver–Jeunet–de Gribaldy	+ 22"
10	Hennie Kuiper (NED)	Frisol–G.B.C.	s.t.

== Stage 3 ==
25 April 1975 - Granada to Granada, 179 km (111 mi)

Stage 3 result

Rank	Rider	Team	Time
1	Agustín Tamames (ESP)	Super Ser	5h 17' 28"
2	Domingo Perurena (ESP)	Kas–Kaskol	+ 2"
3	Miguel María Lasa (ESP)	Kas–Kaskol	+ 10"
4	Luc Leman (BEL)	Alsaver–Jeunet–de Gribaldy	s.t.
5	Wilfried Wesemael (BEL)	Alsaver–Jeunet–de Gribaldy	s.t.
6	Ramón Medina (ESP)	Monteverde	s.t.
7	Ottavio Crepaldi (ITA)	Magniflex	s.t.
8	Ben Koken (NED)	Alsaver–Jeunet–de Gribaldy	s.t.
9	Henk Prinsen (NED)	Frisol–G.B.C.	s.t.
10	Willy Van Neste (BEL)	Frisol–G.B.C.	s.t.

General classification after Stage 3

Rank	Rider	Team	Time
1	Miguel María Lasa (ESP)	Kas–Kaskol	11h 20' 08"
2	Domingo Perurena (ESP)	Kas–Kaskol	+ 5"
3	Jesús Manzaneque (ESP)	Monteverde	+ 9"
4	José Luis Viejo (ESP)	Super Ser	+ 11"
5	José Martins (POR)	Coelima	+ 12"
6	Pedro Torres (ESP)	Super Ser	+ 19"
7	Fernando Mendes (POR)	Sporting Lisboa-Benfica	+ 21"
8	Wilfried Wesemael (BEL)	Alsaver–Jeunet–de Gribaldy	+ 22"
9	Hennie Kuiper (NED)	Frisol–G.B.C.	s.t.
10	Luc Leman (BEL)	Alsaver–Jeunet–de Gribaldy	+ 23"

== Stage 4 ==
26 April 1975 - Almería to Águilas, 178 km (111 mi)

Stage 4 result

Rank	Rider	Team	Time
1	Marino Basso (ITA)	Magniflex	5h 31' 29"
2	Piet van Katwijk (NED)	Frisol–G.B.C.	+ 6"
3	José Luis Viejo (ESP)	Super Ser	+ 10"
4	Luc Leman (BEL)	Alsaver–Jeunet–de Gribaldy	s.t.
5	Willy Planckaert (BEL)	IJsboerke–Colner	s.t.
6	Herman Vrijders (BEL)	Alsaver–Jeunet–de Gribaldy	s.t.
7	Wilfried Wesemael (BEL)	Alsaver–Jeunet–de Gribaldy	s.t.
8	Ramón Medina (ESP)	Monteverde	s.t.
9	Miguel María Lasa (ESP)	Kas–Kaskol	s.t.
10	Andre Doyen (BEL)	Alsaver–Jeunet–de Gribaldy	s.t.

General classification after Stage 4

Rank	Rider	Team	Time
1	Miguel María Lasa (ESP)	Kas–Kaskol	16h 51' 47"
2	José Luis Viejo (ESP)	Super Ser	+ 7"
3	Domingo Perurena (ESP)	Kas–Kaskol	+ 8"
4	Jesús Manzaneque (ESP)	Monteverde	+ 9"
5	José Martins (POR)	Coelima	+ 12"
6	Pedro Torres (ESP)	Super Ser	+ 19"
7	Fernando Mendes (POR)	Sporting Lisboa-Benfica	+ 21"
8	Wilfried Wesemael (BEL)	Alsaver–Jeunet–de Gribaldy	+ 22"
9	Hennie Kuiper (NED)	Frisol–G.B.C.	s.t.
10	Luc Leman (BEL)	Alsaver–Jeunet–de Gribaldy	+ 23"

== Stage 5 ==
27 April 1975 - Águilas to Murcia, 176 km (109 mi)

Stage 5 result

Rank	Rider	Team	Time
1	Luc Leman (BEL)	Alsaver–Jeunet–de Gribaldy	5h 23' 23"
2	Albert Hulzebosch (NED)	Frisol–G.B.C.	+ 4"
3	Jean-Jacques Fussien (FRA)	Super Ser	+ 10"
4	Marino Basso (ITA)	Magniflex	s.t.
5	Roger Loysch (BEL)	Alsaver–Jeunet–de Gribaldy	s.t.
6	Ramón Medina (ESP)	Monteverde	s.t.
7	Willy Planckaert (BEL)	IJsboerke–Colner	s.t.
8	Theo Smit (NED)	Frisol–G.B.C.	s.t.
9	Wilfried Wesemael (BEL)	Alsaver–Jeunet–de Gribaldy	s.t.
10	Piet van Katwijk (NED)	Frisol–G.B.C.	s.t.

General classification after Stage 5

Rank	Rider	Team	Time
1	Miguel María Lasa (ESP)	Kas–Kaskol	22h 15' 20"
2	Domingo Perurena (ESP)	Kas–Kaskol	+ 2"
3	José Luis Viejo (ESP)	Super Ser	+ 7"
4	Jesús Manzaneque (ESP)	Monteverde	+ 9"
5	José Martins (POR)	Coelima	+ 12"
6	Luc Leman (BEL)	Alsaver–Jeunet–de Gribaldy	+ 13"
7	Pedro Torres (ESP)	Super Ser	+ 19"
8	Fernando Mendes (POR)	Sporting Lisboa-Benfica	+ 21"
9	Hennie Kuiper (NED)	Frisol–G.B.C.	+ 22"
10	Ben Koken (NED)	Alsaver–Jeunet–de Gribaldy	+ 24"

== Stage 6 ==
28 April 1975 - Murcia to Benidorm, 217 km (135 mi)

Stage 6 result

Rank	Rider	Team	Time
1	Marino Basso (ITA)	Magniflex	6h 54' 24"
2	Miguel María Lasa (ESP)	Kas–Kaskol	+ 6"
3	José Luis Viejo (ESP)	Super Ser	s.t.
4	Domingo Perurena (ESP)	Kas–Kaskol	s.t.
5	Roger Swerts (BEL)	IJsboerke–Colner	s.t.
6	Roger Rosiers (BEL)	Super Ser	s.t.
7	Ottavio Crepaldi (ITA)	Magniflex	s.t.
8	Santiago Lazcano (ESP)	Super Ser	s.t.
9	João Sampaio (POR)	Coelima	s.t.
10	Agustín Tamames (ESP)	Super Ser	s.t.

== Stage 7 ==
29 April 1975 - Benidorm to Benidorm, 8.3 km (5.2 mi) (ITT)

Stage 7 result

Rank	Rider	Team	Time
1	Miguel María Lasa (ESP)	Kas–Kaskol	14' 47"
2	Luis Ocaña (ESP)	Super Ser	+ 21"
3	José Martins (POR)	Coelima	+ 26"
4	Pedro Torres (ESP)	Super Ser	+ 27"
5	José Pesarrodona (ESP)	Kas–Kaskol	+ 29"
6	José Manuel Fuente (ESP)	Kas–Kaskol	+ 30"
7	Jesús Manzaneque (ESP)	Monteverde	+ 43"
8	Giuseppe Perletto (ITA)	Magniflex	+ 45"
9	Antonio Martos (ESP)	Kas–Kaskol	+ 46"
10	Manuel Rego (POR)	Coelima	+ 48"

General classification after Stage 7

Rank	Rider	Team	Time
1	Miguel María Lasa (ESP)	Kas–Kaskol	29h 24' 37"
2	José Martins (POR)	Coelima	+ 42"
3	Pedro Torres (ESP)	Super Ser	+ 50"
4	Luis Ocaña (ESP)	Super Ser	+ 52"
5	Jesús Manzaneque (ESP)	Monteverde	+ 56"
6	José Luis Viejo (ESP)	Super Ser	+ 1' 02"
7	José Pesarrodona (ESP)	Kas–Kaskol	+ 1' 11"
8	Giuseppe Perletto (ITA)	Magniflex	+ 1' 13"
9	Hennie Kuiper (NED)	Frisol–G.B.C.	+ 1' 17"
10	Manuel Rego (POR)	Coelima	+ 1' 22"

== Stage 8 ==
30 April 1975 - Benidorm to La Pobla de Farnals, 217 km (135 mi)

Stage 8 result

Rank	Rider	Team	Time
1	Marino Basso (ITA)	Magniflex	5h 52' 03"
2	Jean-Jacques Fussien (FRA)	Super Ser	+ 6"
3	Piet van Katwijk (NED)	Frisol–G.B.C.	s.t.
4	Herman Vrijders (BEL)	Alsaver–Jeunet–de Gribaldy	s.t.
5	Roger Rosiers (BEL)	Super Ser	s.t.
6	Domingo Perurena (ESP)	Kas–Kaskol	s.t.
7	José Luis Viejo (ESP)	Super Ser	s.t.
8	Eric Leman (BEL)	Alsaver–Jeunet–de Gribaldy	s.t.
9	Miguel María Lasa (ESP)	Kas–Kaskol	s.t.
10	Hennie Kuiper (NED)	Frisol–G.B.C.	s.t.

General classification after Stage 8

Rank	Rider	Team	Time
1	Miguel María Lasa (ESP)	Kas–Kaskol	35h 16' 50"
2	José Martins (POR)	Coelima	+ 42"
3	Pedro Torres (ESP)	Super Ser	+ 50"
4	Luis Ocaña (ESP)	Super Ser	+ 52"
5	Jesús Manzaneque (ESP)	Monteverde	+ 56"
6	José Luis Viejo (ESP)	Super Ser	+ 1' 02"
7	José Pesarrodona (ESP)	Kas–Kaskol	+ 1' 11"
8	Giuseppe Perletto (ITA)	Magniflex	+ 1' 13"
9	Hennie Kuiper (NED)	Frisol–G.B.C.	+ 1' 17"
10	Manuel Rego (POR)	Coelima	+ 1' 22"

== Stage 9 ==
1 May 1975 - La Pobla de Farnals to Vinaròs, 157 km (98 mi)

Stage 9 result

Rank	Rider	Team	Time
1	Marino Basso (ITA)	Magniflex	4h 00' 57"
2	Eric Leman (BEL)	Alsaver–Jeunet–de Gribaldy	+ 6"
3	Albert Hulzebosch (NED)	Frisol–G.B.C.	s.t.
4	Miguel María Lasa (ESP)	Kas–Kaskol	s.t.
5	Jean-Jacques Fussien (FRA)	Super Ser	s.t.
6	Luc Leman (BEL)	Alsaver–Jeunet–de Gribaldy	s.t.
7	Theo Smit (NED)	Frisol–G.B.C.	s.t.
8	José Luis Viejo (ESP)	Super Ser	s.t.
9	Herman Vrijders (BEL)	Alsaver–Jeunet–de Gribaldy	s.t.
10	Piet van Katwijk (NED)	Frisol–G.B.C.	s.t.

General classification after Stage 9

Rank	Rider	Team	Time
1	Miguel María Lasa (ESP)	Kas–Kaskol	39h 17' 57"
2	José Martins (POR)	Coelima	+ 42"
3	Pedro Torres (ESP)	Super Ser	+ 50"
4	Luis Ocaña (ESP)	Super Ser	+ 52"
5	Jesús Manzaneque (ESP)	Monteverde	+ 56"
6	José Luis Viejo (ESP)	Super Ser	+ 1' 02"
7	José Pesarrodona (ESP)	Kas–Kaskol	+ 1' 11"
8	Giuseppe Perletto (ITA)	Magniflex	+ 1' 13"
9	Hennie Kuiper (NED)	Frisol–G.B.C.	+ 1' 17"
10	Manuel Rego (POR)	Coelima	+ 1' 22"

== Stage 10 ==
2 May 1975 - Vinaròs to Cambrils, 173 km (107 mi)

Stage 10 result

Rank	Rider	Team	Time
1	Marino Basso (ITA)	Magniflex	4h 39' 40"
2	Wilfried Wesemael (BEL)	Alsaver–Jeunet–de Gribaldy	+ 6"
3	Jean-Jacques Fussien (FRA)	Super Ser	s.t.
4	Luc Leman (BEL)	Alsaver–Jeunet–de Gribaldy	s.t.
5	Domingo Perurena (ESP)	Kas–Kaskol	s.t.
6	André Delcroix (BEL)	IJsboerke–Colner	s.t.
7	Roger Rosiers (BEL)	Super Ser	s.t.
8	Ramón Medina (ESP)	Monteverde	s.t.
9	José De Cauwer (BEL)	Frisol–G.B.C.	s.t.
10	Ventura Díaz (ESP)	Monteverde	s.t.

General classification after Stage 10

Rank	Rider	Team	Time
1	Miguel María Lasa (ESP)	Kas–Kaskol	43h 57' 47"
2	José Martins (POR)	Coelima	+ 42"
3	Pedro Torres (ESP)	Super Ser	+ 50"
4	Luis Ocaña (ESP)	Super Ser	+ 52"
5	Jesús Manzaneque (ESP)	Monteverde	+ 56"
6	José Luis Viejo (ESP)	Super Ser	+ 1' 02"
7	José Pesarrodona (ESP)	Kas–Kaskol	+ 1' 11"
8	Giuseppe Perletto (ITA)	Magniflex	+ 1' 13"
9	Hennie Kuiper (NED)	Frisol–G.B.C.	+ 1' 17"
10	Manuel Rego (POR)	Coelima	+ 1' 22"
