= List of teams and cyclists in the 1975 Vuelta a España =

For the 1975 Vuelta a España, the field consisted of 90 riders; 54 finished the race.

== By rider ==
Legend
No.	Starting number worn by the rider during the Vuelta
Pos.	Position in the general classification
DNF	Denotes a rider who did not finish

No.	Name	Nationality	Team	Pos.	Ref
1	José Manuel Fuente	Spain	Kas	DNF	
2	Domingo Perurena	Spain	Kas	2	
3	José Antonio González Linares	Spain	Kas	28	
4	José Pesarrodona	Spain	Kas	18	
5	Andrés Oliva	Spain	Kas	15	
6	Juan Manuel Santisteban	Spain	Kas	43	
7	Miguel María Lasa	Spain	Kas	3	
8	Antonio Martos	Spain	Kas	11	
9	José Nazabal	Spain	Kas	23	
10	Antonio Menéndez	Spain	Kas	25	
11	Fedor den Hertog	Netherlands	Frisol–GBC	DNF	
12	Hennie Kuiper	Netherlands	Frisol–GBC	5	
13	Willy Van Neste	Belgium	Frisol–GBC	36	
14	Henk Poppe	Netherlands	Frisol–GBC	DNF	
15	Piet van Katwijk	Netherlands	Frisol–GBC	DNF	
16	Donald Allan	Australia	Frisol–GBC	52	
17	José De Cauwer	Belgium	Frisol–GBC	DNF	
18	Henk Prinsen	Netherlands	Frisol–GBC	DNF	
19	Albert Hulzebosch	Netherlands	Frisol–GBC	DNF	
20	Theo Smit	Netherlands	Frisol–GBC	DNF	
21	Eric Leman	Belgium	Alsaver–Jeunet	DNF	
22	Luc Leman	Belgium	Alsaver–Jeunet	DNF	
23	Herman Vrijders	Belgium	Alsaver–Jeunet	54	
24	Roger Loysch (b.1951)	Belgium	Alsaver–Jeunet	42	
25	Ben Koken	Netherlands	Alsaver–Jeunet	34	
26	Andre Doyen	Belgium	Alsaver–Jeunet	DNF	
27	Lucien De Brauwere	Belgium	Alsaver–Jeunet	49	
28	Wilfried Wesemael	Belgium	Alsaver–Jeunet	39	
29	Manuel Santos Castillo	Spain	Alsaver–Jeunet	DNF	
30	Ronny Vanmarcke	Belgium	Alsaver–Jeunet	50	
31	Luis Ocaña	Spain	Super Ser	4	
32	Agustín Tamames	Spain	Super Ser	1	
33	Roger Rosiers	Belgium	Super Ser	31	
34	Jean-Jacques Fussien	France	Super Ser	DNF	
35	Santiago Lazcano	Spain	Super Ser	9	
36	José Luis Uribezubia	Spain	Super Ser	DNF	
37	José Luis Viejo	Spain	Super Ser	DNF	
38	Eddy Peelman	Belgium	Super Ser	DNF	
39	José Gómez Lucas	Spain	Super Ser	DNF	
40	Pedro Torres	Spain	Super Ser	14	
41	Roger Swerts	Belgium	IJsboerke–Colner	29	
42	Willy In 't Ven	Belgium	IJsboerke–Colner	37	
43	Julien Stevens	Belgium	IJsboerke–Colner	46	
44	André Delcroix	Belgium	IJsboerke–Colner	DNF	
45	Raymond Steegmans	Belgium	IJsboerke–Colner	DNF	
46	Ludo Peeters	Belgium	IJsboerke–Colner	45	
47	Joseph Borguet	Belgium	IJsboerke–Colner	21	
48	Willy Planckaert	Belgium	IJsboerke–Colner	DNF	
49	Louis Verreydt	Belgium	IJsboerke–Colner	DNF	
50	Roger Loysch (b.1948)	Belgium	IJsboerke–Colner	DNF	
51	Fernando Mendes	Portugal	Sporting Lisboa-Benfica	6	
52	Venceslau Fernandes	Portugal	Sporting Lisboa-Benfica	38	
53	Manuel Coelho	Portugal	Sporting Lisboa-Benfica	51	
54	Joaquim Leite	Portugal	Sporting Lisboa-Benfica	DNF	
55	José Madeira	Portugal	Sporting Lisboa-Benfica	12	
56	Américo Silva	Portugal	Sporting Lisboa-Benfica	DNF	
57	Antonio Martins	Portugal	Sporting Lisboa-Benfica	13	
58	Fernando Vieira	Portugal	Sporting Lisboa-Benfica	DNF	
59	José Carvalho	Portugal	Sporting Lisboa-Benfica	DNF	
60	Emidio Ferreira	Portugal	Sporting Lisboa-Benfica	53	
61	Marino Basso	Italy	Magniflex	DNF	
62	Armando Lora	Italy	Magniflex	44	
63	Giuseppe Perletto	Italy	Magniflex	7	
64	Ottavio Crepaldi	Italy	Magniflex	16	
65	Mario Branchi	Italy	Magniflex	48	
66	Mauro Landini	Italy	Magniflex	DNF	
67	Daniele Mazziero	Italy	Magniflex	DNF	
68	Glauco Santoni	Italy	Magniflex	41	
69	Mauro Vannucchi	Italy	Magniflex	DNF	
70	Wilmo Francioni	Italy	Magniflex	47	
71	José Luis Abilleira	Spain	Monteverde	22	
72	Manuel Esparza	Spain	Monteverde	17	
73	Andrés Gandarias	Spain	Monteverde	26	
74	Ventura Díaz	Spain	Monteverde	19	
75	Nemesio Jiménez	Spain	Monteverde	DNF	
76	Jesús Manzaneque	Spain	Monteverde	10	
77	Ramón Medina	Spain	Monteverde	DNF	
78	Antonio Jiménez Luján	Spain	Monteverde	27	
79	José Antonio Pontón Ruiz	Spain	Monteverde	30	
80	Luis Zubero	Spain	Monteverde	DNF	
81	José Martins	Portugal	Coelima	8	
82	Joaquim Andrade	Portugal	Coelima	24	
83	Mário Silva	Portugal	Coelima	40	
84	Joaquim Lino	Portugal	Coelima	DNF	
85	Herculano Oliveira	Portugal	Coelima	35	
86	Manuel Rego	Portugal	Coelima	20	
87	Pedro Rodrigues	Portugal	Coelima	DNF	
88	João Sampaio	Portugal	Coelima	32	
89	Santiago Segu	Spain	Coelima	33	
90	Gonzalo Ruiz Torres	Spain	Coelima	DNF	
