= 1975 Vuelta a España, Stage 11a to Stage 19b =

Cycling race stages

The 1975 Vuelta a España was the 30th edition of the Vuelta a España, one of cycling's Grand Tours. The Vuelta began in Fuengirola, with a prologue individual time trial on 22 April, and Stage 11a occurred on 3 May with a stage from Cambrils. The race finished in San Sebastián on 11 May.

== Stage 11a ==
3 May 1975 - Cambrils to Barcelona, 151 km (93.8 mi)

Route:

Stage 11a result

Rank	Rider	Team	Time
1	Antonio Menéndez (ESP)	Kas–Kaskol	3h 42' 00"
2	Pedro Torres (ESP)	Super Ser	+ 3"
3	Marino Basso (ITA)	Magniflex	s.t.
4	Jean-Jacques Fussien (FRA)	Super Ser	s.t.
5	Roger Rosiers (BEL)	Super Ser	s.t.
6	José Luis Viejo (ESP)	Super Ser	s.t.
7	Roger Swerts (BEL)	IJsboerke–Colner	s.t.
8	Wilfried Wesemael (BEL)	Alsaver–Jeunet–de Gribaldy	s.t.
9	Luc Leman (BEL)	Alsaver–Jeunet–de Gribaldy	s.t.
10	Ottavio Crepaldi (ITA)	Magniflex	s.t.

== Stage 11b ==
3 May 1975 - Barcelona to Barcelona, 30.3 km (18.8 mi)

Stage 11b result

Rank	Rider	Team	Time
1	Marino Basso (ITA)	Magniflex	45' 47"
2	Roger Rosiers (BEL)	Super Ser	s.t.
3	Jean-Jacques Fussien (FRA)	Super Ser	s.t.
4	Luc Leman (BEL)	Alsaver–Jeunet–de Gribaldy	s.t.
5	Ramón Medina (ESP)	Monteverde	s.t.
6	Ben Koken (NED)	Alsaver–Jeunet–de Gribaldy	s.t.
7	José Luis Viejo (ESP)	Super Ser	s.t.
8	Wilfried Wesemael (BEL)	Alsaver–Jeunet–de Gribaldy	s.t.
9	José Martins (POR)	Coelima	s.t.
10	Hennie Kuiper (NED)	Frisol–G.B.C.	s.t.

General classification after Stage 11b

Rank	Rider	Team	Time
1	Miguel María Lasa (ESP)	Kas–Kaskol	48h 25' 42"
2	José Martins (POR)	Coelima	+ 42"
3	Pedro Torres (ESP)	Super Ser	+ 45"
4	Luis Ocaña (ESP)	Super Ser	+ 52"
5	Jesús Manzaneque (ESP)	Monteverde	+ 56"
6	José Luis Viejo (ESP)	Super Ser	+ 1' 02"
7	José Pesarrodona (ESP)	Kas–Kaskol	+ 1' 11"
8	Giuseppe Perletto (ITA)	Magniflex	+ 1' 13"
9	Hennie Kuiper (NED)	Frisol–G.B.C.	+ 1' 17"
10	Manuel Rego (POR)	Coelima	+ 1' 22"

== Stage 12 ==
4 May 1975 - Palma de Mallorca to Palma de Mallorca, 181 km (112.5 mi)

Stage 12 result

Rank	Rider	Team	Time
1	Agustín Tamames (ESP)	Super Ser	5h 18' 25"
2	Miguel María Lasa (ESP)	Kas–Kaskol	+ 6"
3	Luc Leman (BEL)	Alsaver–Jeunet–de Gribaldy	+ 10"
4	Jean-Jacques Fussien (FRA)	Super Ser	s.t.
5	Wilfried Wesemael (BEL)	Alsaver–Jeunet–de Gribaldy	s.t.
6	Ben Koken (NED)	Alsaver–Jeunet–de Gribaldy	s.t.
7	Domingo Perurena (ESP)	Kas–Kaskol	s.t.
8	Pedro Torres (ESP)	Super Ser	s.t.
9	Manuel Rego (POR)	Coelima	s.t.
10	Antonio Martos (ESP)	Kas–Kaskol	s.t.

General classification after Stage 12

Rank	Rider	Team	Time
1	Miguel María Lasa (ESP)	Kas–Kaskol	53h 44' 13"
2	José Martins (POR)	Coelima	+ 46"
3	Pedro Torres (ESP)	Super Ser	+ 49"
4	Luis Ocaña (ESP)	Super Ser	+ 56"
5	Jesús Manzaneque (ESP)	Monteverde	+ 1' 00"
6	José Luis Viejo (ESP)	Super Ser	+ 1' 06"
7	José Pesarrodona (ESP)	Kas–Kaskol	+ 1' 15"
8	Giuseppe Perletto (ITA)	Magniflex	+ 1' 17"
9	Agustín Tamames (ESP)	Super Ser	+ 1' 20"
10	Hennie Kuiper (NED)	Frisol–G.B.C.	+ 1' 21"

== Stage 13 ==
5 May 1975 - Barcelona to Tremp, 189 km (117 mi)

Stage 13 result

Rank	Rider	Team	Time
1	Domingo Perurena (ESP)	Kas–Kaskol	5h 30' 18"
2	Santiago Lazcano (ESP)	Super Ser	+ 9"
3	José Gómez Lucas (ESP)	Super Ser	+ 22"
4	Juan Manuel Santisteban (ESP)	Kas–Kaskol	+ 47"
5	Miguel María Lasa (ESP)	Kas–Kaskol	+ 5' 00"
6	Luc Leman (BEL)	Alsaver–Jeunet–de Gribaldy	+ 5' 01"
7	Agustín Tamames (ESP)	Super Ser	s.t.
8	Ben Koken (NED)	Alsaver–Jeunet–de Gribaldy	s.t.
9	Marino Basso (ITA)	Magniflex	s.t.
10	Roger Rosiers (BEL)	Super Ser	s.t.

== Stage 14 ==
6 May 1975 - Tremp to Formigal, 233 km (145 mi)

Stage 14 result

Rank	Rider	Team	Time
1	Agustín Tamames (ESP)	Super Ser	7h 22' 03"
2	Miguel María Lasa (ESP)	Kas–Kaskol	+ 21"
3	Luis Ocaña (ESP)	Super Ser	+ 28"
4	Hennie Kuiper (NED)	Frisol–G.B.C.	+ 45"
5	Antonio Martins (POR)	Sporting Lisboa-Benfica	+ 1' 46"
6	Ottavio Crepaldi (ITA)	Magniflex	+ 2' 01"
7	Domingo Perurena (ESP)	Kas–Kaskol	+ 2' 03"
8	Giuseppe Perletto (ITA)	Magniflex	s.t.
9	Fernando Mendes (POR)	Sporting Lisboa-Benfica	+ 2' 49"
10	José Madeira (POR)	Sporting Lisboa-Benfica	+ 3' 04"

General classification after Stage 14

Rank	Rider	Team	Time
1	Domingo Perurena (ESP)	Kas–Kaskol	66h 40' 16"
2	Miguel María Lasa (ESP)	Kas–Kaskol	+ 1' 39"
3	Santiago Lazcano (ESP)	Super Ser	+ 2' 14"
4	Agustín Tamames (ESP)	Super Ser	+ 2' 39"
5	Luis Ocaña (ESP)	Super Ser	+ 2' 43"
6	Hennie Kuiper (NED)	Frisol–G.B.C.	+ 3' 25"
7	Giuseppe Perletto (ITA)	Magniflex	+ 4' 39"
8	Pedro Torres (ESP)	Super Ser	+ 5' 23"
9	Fernando Mendes (POR)	Sporting Lisboa-Benfica	+ 5' 31"
10	Ottavio Crepaldi (ITA)	Magniflex	+ 5' 41"

== Stage 15 ==
7 May 1975 - Jaca to Irache, 160 km (99 mi)

Stage 15 result

Rank	Rider	Team	Time
1	Agustín Tamames (ESP)	Super Ser	4h 48' 25"
2	Domingo Perurena (ESP)	Kas–Kaskol	+ 6"
3	Miguel María Lasa (ESP)	Kas–Kaskol	+ 12"
4	Luis Ocaña (ESP)	Super Ser	+ 13"
5	Wilfried Wesemael (BEL)	Alsaver–Jeunet–de Gribaldy	+ 14"
6	Hennie Kuiper (NED)	Frisol–G.B.C.	s.t.
7	Luc Leman (BEL)	Alsaver–Jeunet–de Gribaldy	s.t.
8	Giuseppe Perletto (ITA)	Magniflex	s.t.
9	Antonio Martos (ESP)	Kas–Kaskol	s.t.
10	Manuel Rego (POR)	Coelima	s.t.

General classification after Stage 15

Rank	Rider	Team	Time
1	Domingo Perurena (ESP)	Kas–Kaskol	71h 28' 44"
2	Miguel María Lasa (ESP)	Kas–Kaskol	+ 1' 48"
3	Santiago Lazcano (ESP)	Super Ser	+ 2' 25"
4	Agustín Tamames (ESP)	Super Ser	+ 2' 36"
5	Luis Ocaña (ESP)	Super Ser	+ 2' 53"
6	Hennie Kuiper (NED)	Frisol–G.B.C.	+ 3' 36"
7	Giuseppe Perletto (ITA)	Magniflex	+ 4' 50"
8	Pedro Torres (ESP)	Super Ser	+ 5' 34"
9	Fernando Mendes (POR)	Sporting Lisboa-Benfica	+ 5' 42"
10	Ottavio Crepaldi (ITA)	Magniflex	+ 5' 52"

== Stage 16 ==
8 May 1975 - Irache to Urkiola, 150 km (93 mi)

Stage 16 result

Rank	Rider	Team	Time
1	Agustín Tamames (ESP)	Super Ser	4h 10' 31"
2	Miguel María Lasa (ESP)	Kas–Kaskol	+ 25"
3	Hennie Kuiper (NED)	Frisol–G.B.C.	+ 30"
4	Luis Ocaña (ESP)	Super Ser	+ 32"
5	Giuseppe Perletto (ITA)	Magniflex	+ 45"
6	Antonio Martos (ESP)	Kas–Kaskol	+ 56"
7	Manuel Rego (POR)	Coelima	+ 1' 02"
8	Jesús Manzaneque (ESP)	Monteverde	+ 1' 10"
9	José Martins (POR)	Coelima	+ 1' 12"
10	Ben Koken (NED)	Alsaver–Jeunet–de Gribaldy	+ 1' 19"

General classification after Stage 16

Rank	Rider	Team	Time
1	Domingo Perurena (ESP)	Kas–Kaskol	75h 40' 34"
2	Miguel María Lasa (ESP)	Kas–Kaskol	+ 54"
3	Agustín Tamames (ESP)	Super Ser	+ 1' 17"
4	Luis Ocaña (ESP)	Super Ser	+ 2' 06"
5	Hennie Kuiper (NED)	Frisol–G.B.C.	+ 2' 47"
6	Santiago Lazcano (ESP)	Super Ser	+ 3' 54"
7	Giuseppe Perletto (ITA)	Magniflex	+ 4' 16"
8	Fernando Mendes (POR)	Sporting Lisboa-Benfica	+ 5' 38"
9	Antonio Martos (ESP)	Kas–Kaskol	+ 5' 39"
10	Pedro Torres (ESP)	Super Ser	+ 6' 19"

== Stage 17 ==
9 May 1975 - Durango to Bilbao, 123 km (76 mi)

Stage 17 result

Rank	Rider	Team	Time
1	Donald Allan (AUS)	Frisol–G.B.C.	3h 14' 50"
2	Marino Basso (ITA)	Magniflex	+ 6"
3	Agustín Tamames (ESP)	Super Ser	+ 10"
4	Domingo Perurena (ESP)	Kas–Kaskol	s.t.
5	Roger Rosiers (BEL)	Super Ser	s.t.
6	Jesús Manzaneque (ESP)	Monteverde	s.t.
7	Roger Swerts (BEL)	IJsboerke–Colner	s.t.
8	Ottavio Crepaldi (ITA)	Magniflex	s.t.
9	Miguel María Lasa (ESP)	Kas–Kaskol	s.t.
10	Herman Vrijders (BEL)	Alsaver–Jeunet–de Gribaldy	s.t.

General classification after Stage 17

Rank	Rider	Team	Time
1	Domingo Perurena (ESP)	Kas–Kaskol	78h 55' 31"
2	Miguel María Lasa (ESP)	Kas–Kaskol	+ 57"
3	Agustín Tamames (ESP)	Super Ser	+ 1' 20"
4	Luis Ocaña (ESP)	Super Ser	+ 2' 09"
5	Hennie Kuiper (NED)	Frisol–G.B.C.	+ 2' 50"
6	Santiago Lazcano (ESP)	Super Ser	+ 3' 57"
7	Giuseppe Perletto (ITA)	Magniflex	+ 4' 19"
8	Fernando Mendes (POR)	Sporting Lisboa-Benfica	+ 5' 42"
9	Antonio Martos (ESP)	Kas–Kaskol	+ 6' 01"
10	Pedro Torres (ESP)	Super Ser	+ 6' 22"

== Stage 18 ==
10 May 1975 - Bilbao to Miranda de Ebro, 186 km (116 mi)

Stage 18 result

Rank	Rider	Team	Time
1	Hennie Kuiper (NED)	Frisol–G.B.C.	5h 24' 31"
2	Agustín Tamames (ESP)	Super Ser	+ 51"
3	Miguel María Lasa (ESP)	Kas–Kaskol	+ 55"
4	Jesús Manzaneque (ESP)	Monteverde	s.t.
5	José Madeira (POR)	Sporting Lisboa-Benfica	s.t.
6	Fernando Mendes (POR)	Sporting Lisboa-Benfica	s.t.
7	Antonio Martins (POR)	Sporting Lisboa-Benfica	s.t.
8	José Martins (POR)	Coelima	s.t.
9	Joseph Borguet (BEL)	IJsboerke–Colner	s.t.
10	Manuel Rego (POR)	Coelima	s.t.

General classification after Stage 18

Rank	Rider	Team	Time
1	Domingo Perurena (ESP)	Kas–Kaskol	84h 20' 57"
2	Miguel María Lasa (ESP)	Kas–Kaskol	+ 57"
3	Agustín Tamames (ESP)	Super Ser	+ 1' 16"
4	Hennie Kuiper (NED)	Frisol–G.B.C.	+ 1' 55"
5	Luis Ocaña (ESP)	Super Ser	+ 2' 09"
6	Giuseppe Perletto (ITA)	Magniflex	+ 5' 18"
7	Fernando Mendes (POR)	Sporting Lisboa-Benfica	+ 5' 42"
8	Antonio Martos (ESP)	Kas–Kaskol	+ 6' 01"
9	José Martins (POR)	Coelima	+ 6' 25"
10	Santiago Lazcano (ESP)	Super Ser	+ 6' 50"

== Stage 19a ==
11 May 1975 - Miranda de Ebro to Beasain, 110 km (68 mi)

Stage 19a result

Rank	Rider	Team	Time
1	Julien Stevens (BEL)	IJsboerke–Colner	2h 53' 38"
2	Ludo Peeters (BEL)	IJsboerke–Colner	+ 5"
3	Roger Swerts (BEL)	IJsboerke–Colner	s.t.
4	Hennie Kuiper (NED)	Frisol–G.B.C.	s.t.
5	Domingo Perurena (ESP)	Kas–Kaskol	s.t.
6	José Antonio González Linares (ESP)	Kas–Kaskol	s.t.
7	José Pesarrodona (ESP)	Kas–Kaskol	s.t.
8	Andrés Oliva (ESP)	Kas–Kaskol	s.t.
9	Juan Manuel Santisteban (ESP)	Kas–Kaskol	s.t.
10	Miguel María Lasa (ESP)	Kas–Kaskol	s.t.

== Stage 19b ==
11 May 1975 - San Sebastián to San Sebastián, 31.7 km (19.7 mi) (individual time trial)

Stage 19b result

Rank	Rider	Team	Time
1	Jesús Manzaneque (ESP)	Monteverde	44' 19"
2	Roger Swerts (BEL)	IJsboerke–Colner	+ 36"
3	Agustín Tamames (ESP)	Super Ser	+ 41"
4	Luis Ocaña (ESP)	Super Ser	+ 1' 21"
5	José Pesarrodona (ESP)	Kas–Kaskol	+ 1' 31"
6	José Antonio González Linares (ESP)	Kas–Kaskol	+ 1' 35"
7	Miguel María Lasa (ESP)	Kas–Kaskol	+ 1' 36"
8	Pedro Torres (ESP)	Super Ser	+ 1' 48"
9	Joaquim Andrade (POR)	Coelima	+ 1' 56"
10	Roger Rosiers (BEL)	Super Ser	+ 2' 02"

General classification after Stage 19b

Rank	Rider	Team	Time
1	Agustín Tamames (ESP)	Super Ser	88h 00' 56"
2	Domingo Perurena (ESP)	Kas–Kaskol	+ 14"
3	Miguel María Lasa (ESP)	Kas–Kaskol	+ 33"
4	Luis Ocaña (ESP)	Super Ser	+ 1' 33"
5	Hennie Kuiper (NED)	Frisol–G.B.C.	+ 2' 28"
6	Fernando Mendes (POR)	Sporting Lisboa-Benfica	+ 3' 49"
7	Giuseppe Perletto (ITA)	Magniflex	+ 5' 55"
8	José Martins (POR)	Coelima	+ 6' 53"
9	Santiago Lazcano (ESP)	Super Ser	+ 7' 26"
10	Jesús Manzaneque (ESP)	Monteverde	+ 7' 57"
