= List of teams and cyclists in the 1973 Vuelta a España =

For the 1973 Vuelta a España, the field consisted of 80 riders; 62 finished the race.

== By rider ==
Legend
No.	Starting number worn by the rider during the Vuelta
Pos.	Position in the general classification
Time	Deficit to the winner of the general classification
DNF	Denotes a rider who did not finish

No.	Name	Nationality	Team	Pos.	Time	Ref
1	Francisco Elorriaga	Spain	Kas	46	+ 34' 45"	
2	Jaime Huélamo	Spain	Kas	59	+ 59' 07"	
3	Nemesio Jiménez	Spain	Kas	36	+ 29' 40"	
4	Vicente López Carril	Spain	Kas	17	+ 17' 08"	
5	José Antonio González	Spain	Kas	DNF	—	
6	Antonio Martos Aguilar	Spain	Kas	19	+ 17' 58"	
7	Carlos Melero	Spain	Kas	45	+ 31' 59"	
8	Domingo Perurena	Spain	Kas	44	+ 31' 32"	
9	José Pesarrodona	Spain	Kas	4	+ 5' 54"	
10	José Luis Uribezubia	Spain	Kas	18	+ 17' 43"	
11	Luis Ocaña	Spain	Bic	2	+ 3' 46"	
12	Joaquim Agostinho	Portugal	Bic	6	+ 8' 15"	
13	Bernard Labourdette	France	Bic	14	+ 15' 56"	
14	José Catieau	France	Bic	12	+ 15' 15"	
15	Roger Rosiers	Belgium	Bic	31	+ 26' 23"	
16	Christian Palka	France	Bic	58	+ 57' 06"	
17	Guy Santy	France	Bic	DNF	—	
18	Johny Schleck	Luxembourg	Bic	34	+ 28' 58"	
19	Sylvain Vasseur	France	Bic	DNF	—	
20	Jean-Jacques Fussien	France	Bic	DNF	—	
21	José Luis Abilleira	Spain	La Casera–Peña Bahamontes	15	+ 16' 17"	
22	José Gómez	Spain	La Casera–Peña Bahamontes	DNF	—	
23	Luis Balagué	Spain	La Casera–Peña Bahamontes	8	+ 12' 26"	
24	Jesús Manzaneque	Spain	La Casera–Peña Bahamontes	10	+ 15' 01"	
25	Félix González	Spain	La Casera–Peña Bahamontes	47	+ 34' 54"	
26	Agustín Tamames	Spain	La Casera–Peña Bahamontes	7	+ 9' 15"	
27	Pedro Torres	Spain	La Casera–Peña Bahamontes	5	+ 7' 29"	
28	Andrés Oliva	Spain	La Casera–Peña Bahamontes	32	+ 27' 47"	
29	José Viejo	Spain	La Casera–Peña Bahamontes	33	+ 27' 48"	
30	Juan Santiago Zurano Jerez	Spain	La Casera–Peña Bahamontes	16	+ 17' 07"	
31	Eddy Merckx	Belgium	Molteni	1	84h 40' 50"	
32	Joseph Bruyère	Belgium	Molteni	30	+ 26' 07"	
33	Jos Deschoenmaecker	Belgium	Molteni	DNF	—	
34	Jos Huysmans	Belgium	Molteni	37	+ 29' 50"	
35	Willy In 't Ven	Belgium	Molteni	41	+ 31' 05"	
36	Edward Janssens	Belgium	Molteni	25	+ 22' 13"	
37	Frans Mintjens	Belgium	Molteni	50	+ 35' 50"	
38	Roger Swerts	Belgium	Molteni	9	+ 13' 27"	
39	Jozef Spruyt	Belgium	Molteni	49	+ 35' 27"	
40	Victor Van Schil	Belgium	Molteni	13	+ 15' 31"	
41	Eric Leman	Belgium	Peugeot–BP	55	+ 52' 54"	
42	Jacques Esclassan	France	Peugeot–BP	28	+ 25' 31"	
43	Jean-Pierre Paranteau	France	Peugeot–BP	39	+ 30' 46"	
44	Pierre Martelozzo	France	Peugeot–BP	35	+ 29' 31"	
45	Ferdinand Bracke	Belgium	Peugeot–BP	54	+ 49' 47"	
46	Bernard Thévenet	France	Peugeot–BP	3	+ 4' 16"	
47	Jaak De Boever	Belgium	Peugeot–BP	DNF	—	
48	Jean-Pierre Guitard	France	Peugeot–BP	60	+ 57' 24"	
49	Jean-Claude Meunier	France	Peugeot–BP	DNF	—	
50	Claude Aiguesparses	France	Peugeot–BP	56	+ 52' 58"	
51	Fernando Mendes	Portugal	Coelima–Benfica	27	+ 24' 46"	
52	Venceslau Fernandes	Portugal	Coelima–Benfica	21	+ 19' 22"	
53	Pasqual Fandos Araguete	Spain	Coelima–Benfica	DNF	—	
54	Eduardo Castelló	Spain	Coelima–Benfica	DNF	—	
55	José Luis Galdamez	Spain	Coelima–Benfica	29	+ 25' 36"	
56	Fernando Dias Ferreira	Portugal	Coelima–Benfica	22	+ 20' 57"	
57	José Freitas Martins	Portugal	Coelima–Benfica	38	+ 30' 23"	
58	Joao Pinhal	Portugal	Coelima–Benfica	DNF	—	
59	Orlando Maia Alexandre	Portugal	Coelima–Benfica	DNF	—	
60	José Pereira Machado	Portugal	Coelima–Benfica	57	+ 54' 54"	
61	Ventura Díaz	Spain	Monteverde	20	+ 18' 51"	
62	Segundo Goicoechea	Spain	Monteverde	53	+ 48' 38"	
63	Juan Manuel Santisteban	Spain	Monteverde	48	+ 35' 20"	
64	Manuel Blanco Garea	Spain	Monteverde	24	+ 21' 31"	
65	José Casas García	Spain	Monteverde	42	+ 31' 12"	
66	Ángel Barrigón Argumusa	Spain	Monteverde	26	+ 23' 53"	
67	Manuel Andrade Luza	Spain	Monteverde	51	+ 38' 21"	
68	José Moreno Torres	Spain	Monteverde	DNF	—	
69	Juan Manuel Valls Allegre	Spain	Monteverde	40	+ 30' 47"	
70	Germán Martín Sáez	Spain	Monteverde	23	+ 21' 26"	
71	Gerben Karstens	Netherlands	Rokado	DNF	—	
72	Herman Van Springel	Belgium	Rokado	11	+ 15' 06"	
73	Paul Collaer	Belgium	Rokado	DNF	—	
74	Eddy Peelman	Belgium	Rokado	61	+ 58' 45"	
75	Roger Pingeon	France	Rokado	DNF	—	
76	Pieter Nassen	Belgium	Rokado	43	+ 31' 20"	
77	Jean-Pierre Berckmans	Belgium	Rokado	DNF	—	
78	Jan Van De Wiele	Belgium	Rokado	52	+ 47' 40"	
79	Ferdinand Peersman	Belgium	Rokado	62	+ 1h 05' 34"	
80	Robert Van Lancker	Belgium	Rokado	DNF	—	
