= 1975 Volta a Catalunya =

Race details
- Dates: 3–10 September 1975
- Stages: 7 + Prologue
- Distance: 1,211 km (752.5 mi)
- Winning time: 34h 18' 01"

Results
	Winner	Fausto Bertoglio (ITA)	(Jollj Ceramica)
	Second	Michel Laurent (FRA)	(Miko–de Gribaldy)
	Third	José Freitas Martins (POR)	(Coelima)
	Points	Domingo Perurena (ESP)	(Kas–Kaskol)
	Mountains	Andrés Oliva (ESP)	(Kas–Kaskol)
	Sprints	Andrés Oliva (ESP)	(Kas–Kaskol)
	Team	Jollj Ceramica	

The 1975 Volta a Catalunya was the 55th edition of the Volta a Catalunya cycle race and was held from 3 to 10 September 1975. The race started in Santa Coloma de Gramenet and finished in Tarrasa. The race was won by Fausto Bertoglio of the Jollj Ceramica team.

== General classification ==
Final general classification

Rank	Rider	Team	Time
1	Fausto Bertoglio (ITA)	Jollj Ceramica	34h 18' 01"
2	Michel Laurent (FRA)	Miko–de Gribaldy	+ 13"
3	José Freitas Martins (POR)	Coelima	+ 1' 13"
4	Giovanni Battaglin (ITA)	Jollj Ceramica	+ 1' 16"
5	Domingo Perurena (ESP)	Kas–Kaskol	+ 1' 31"
6	Jesús Manzaneque (ESP)	Monteverde–Sanson	+ 2' 03"
7	Luis Ocaña (ESP)	Super Ser	+ 2' 03"
8	Pedro Torres (ESP)	Super Ser	+ 2' 13"
9	Tino Conti (ITA)	Furzi–FT	+ 2' 20"
10	Antonio Menéndez (ESP)	Kas–Kaskol	+ 2' 40"
