= Roger Loysch =

Roger Loysch may refer to:

- Roger Loysch (cyclist, born 1948), rider for IJsboerke–Colner in the 1975 Vuelta a España
- Roger Loysch (cyclist, born 1951)
