= Beeg =

Beeg may refer to:

- Beeg, Netherlands, the Limburgish name of Grevenbicht, a village in the Netherlands
- Bluegrass Beeg, a music festival taking place in Beeg
- Gunda Beeg, 19th-century German writer and activist

== See also ==
- Bee Gees
- Big (disambiguation)
