= 1975 Vuelta a España =

Race details
- Dates: 22 April – 11 May
- Stages: 19 stages + Prologue, including 2 split stages
- Distance: 3,104 km (1,929 mi)
- Winning time: 88h 00' 56"

Results
Jersey awarded to the overall winner	Winner	Agustín Tamames (ESP)	(Super Ser)
	Second	Domingo Perurena (ESP)	(Kas)
	Third	Miguel María Lasa (ESP)	(Kas)
Jersey awarded to the points classification winner	Points	Miguel María Lasa (ESP)	(Kas)
Jersey awarded to the mountains classification winner	Mountains	Andrés Oliva (ESP)	(Kas)
	Sprints	Fernando Mendes (POR)	(Sport Lisboa e Benfica)
	Team	Kas–Kaskol	

The 30th Edition Vuelta a España (Tour of Spain), a long-distance bicycle stage race and one of the three grand tours, was held from 22 April to 11 May 1975. It consisted of 19 stages covering a total of 3,104 km (1,929 mi), and was won by Agustín Tamames of the Super Ser cycling team. Andrés Oliva won the mountains classification while Miguel María Lasa won the points classification.

== Route ==
List of stages
Stage	Date	Course	Distance	Type	Winner
P	22 April	Fuengirola to Fuengirola	4.4 km (3 mi)	Individual time trial	Roger Swerts (BEL)
1	23 April	Marbella to Marbella	78 km (48 mi)		Wilfried Wesemael (BEL)
2	24 April	Málaga to Granada	143 km (89 mi)		Miguel María Lasa (ESP)
3	25 April	Granada to Granada	179 km (111 mi)		Agustín Tamames (ESP)
4	26 April	Almería to Águilas	178 km (111 mi)		Marino Basso (ITA)
5	27 April	Águilas to Murcia	176 km (109 mi)		Luc Leman (BEL)
6	28 April	Murcia to Benidorm	217 km (135 mi)		Marino Basso (ITA)
7	29 April	Benidorm to Benidorm	8.3 km (5 mi)	Individual time trial	Miguel María Lasa (ESP)
8	30 April	Benidorm to La Pobla de Farnals	217 km (135 mi)		Marino Basso (ITA)
9	1 May	La Pobla de Farnals to Vinaròs	157 km (98 mi)		Marino Basso (ITA)
10	2 May	Vinaròs to Cambrils	173 km (107 mi)		Marino Basso (ITA)
11a	3 May	Cambrils to Barcelona	151 km (94 mi)|		Antonio Menéndez (ESP)
11b	3 May	Barcelona to Barcelona	30.3 km (19 mi)|		Marino Basso (ITA)
12	4 May	Palma de Mallorca to Palma de Mallorca	181 km (112 mi)		Agustín Tamames (ESP)
13	5 May	Barcelona to Tremp	189 km (117 mi)		Domingo Perurena (ESP)
14	6 May	Tremp to Formigal	233 km (145 mi)		Agustín Tamames (ESP)
15	7 May	Jaca to Irache	160 km (99 mi)		Agustín Tamames (ESP)
16	8 May	Irache to Urkiola	150 km (93 mi)		Agustín Tamames (ESP)
17	9 May	Durango to Bilbao	123 km (76 mi)		Donald Allan (AUS)
18	10 May	Bilbao to Miranda de Ebro	186 km (116 mi)		Hennie Kuiper (NED)
19a	11 May	Miranda de Ebro to Beasain	110 km (68 mi)		Julien Stevens (BEL)
19b	11 May	San Sebastián to San Sebastián	31.7 km (20 mi)	Individual time trial	Jesús Manzaneque (ESP)
	Total		3,104 km (1,929 mi)		

== Results ==
=== Final General Classification ===
Rank	Rider	Team	Time
1	(Spain) Agustín Tamames	Super Ser Zeus	88h 00' 56"
2	(Spain) Domingo Perurena	Kas–Kaskol	+ 14"
3	(Spain) Miguel María Lasa	Kas–Kaskol	+ 33"
4	(Spain) Luis Ocaña	Super Ser Zeus	+ 1' 34"
5	(Netherlands) Hennie Kuiper	Frisol–GBC	+ 2' 29"
6	(Portugal) Fernando Mendes	Benfica	+ 5' 50"
7	(Italy) Giuseppe Perletto	Magniflex	+ 5' 55"
8	(Portugal) José Martíns Freitas	Coelima	+ 6' 53"
9	(Spain) Santiago Lazcano	Super Ser Zeus	+ 7' 26"
10	(Spain) Jesús Manzaneque	Monteverde	+ 7' 57"
11	(Spain) Antonio Martos Aguilar	Kas–Kaskol	
12	(Portugal) José Madeira	Benfica	
13	(Portugal) Antonio Martins	Benfica	
14	(Spain) Pedro Torres	Super Ser-Zeus	
15	(Spain) Andrés Oliva	Kas–Kaskol	
16	(Italy) Ottavio Crepaldi	Magniflex	
17	(Spain) Manuel Esparza	Monteverde	
18	(Spain) José Pesarrodona	Kas–Kaskol	
19	(Spain) Ventura Díaz	Monteverde	
20	(Portugal) Manuel Rego	Coelima	
21	(Belgium) Jos Borguet	Ijsboerke	
22	(Spain) José Luis Abilleira	Monteverde	
23	(Spain) José Nazabal Merendia	Kas–Kaskol	
24	(Portugal) Joaquim Andrade	Coelima	
25	(Spain) Antonio Menéndez Gonzalez	Kas–Kaskol	
