= 1972 UCI Road World Championships – Men's road race =

Men's Individual Road Race
1972 UCI Road World Championships
- Rainbow jersey

Race details
- Dates: 6 August 1972
- Stages: 1
- Distance: 272.5 km (169.3 mi)
- Winning time: 7h 05' 59"

Results
	Winner	Marino Basso (ITA)	(Italy)
	Second	Franco Bitossi (ITA)	(Italy)
	Third	Cyrille Guimard (FRA)	(France)

The men's road race at the 1972 UCI Road World Championships was the 39th edition of the event. The race took place on Sunday 6 August 1972 in Gap, France. The race was won by Marino Basso of Italy.

== Final classification ==
General classification (1–10)

Rank	Rider	Time
1st place, gold medalist(s)	Marino Basso (ITA)	7h 05' 59"
2nd place, silver medalist(s)	Franco Bitossi (ITA)	+ 0"
3rd place, bronze medalist(s)	Cyrille Guimard (FRA)	+ 0"
4	Eddy Merckx (BEL)	+ 0"
5	Joop Zoetemelk (NED)	+ 0"
6	Michele Dancelli (ITA)	+ 0"
7	Leif Mortensen (DEN)	+ 0"
8	Frans Verbeeck (BEL)	+ 0"
9	Jean-Pierre Danguillaume (FRA)	+ 1' 07"
10	Felice Gimondi (ITA)	+ 1' 07"
