= 1977 Grote Prijs Jef Scherens =

Race details
- Dates: 18 September 1977
- Stages: 1
- Distance: 214 km (133.0 mi)
- Winning time: 5h 58' 00"

Results
	Winner	Walter Planckaert (BEL)
	Second	Wilfried Wesemael (BEL)
	Third	Benny Schepmans (BEL)

The 1977 Grote Prijs Jef Scherens was the 13th edition of the Grote Prijs Jef Scherens cycle race and was held on 18 September 1977. The race started and finished in Leuven. The race was won by Walter Planckaert.

== General classification ==
Final general classification

Rank	Rider	Time
1	Walter Planckaert (BEL)	5h 58' 00"
2	Wilfried Wesemael (BEL)	+ 0"
3	Benny Schepmans (BEL)	+ 0"
4	Eric Leman (BEL)	+ 0"
5	Cees Priem (NED)	+ 0"
6	Marc Renier (BEL)	+ 0"
7	Marc Demeyer (BEL)	+ 0"
8	Frans Verbeeck (BEL)	+ 0"
9	Herman Vrijders (BEL)	+ 0"
10	Frans Verhaegen (BEL)	+ 0"
