= Day of the Geese =

Basque festival competition

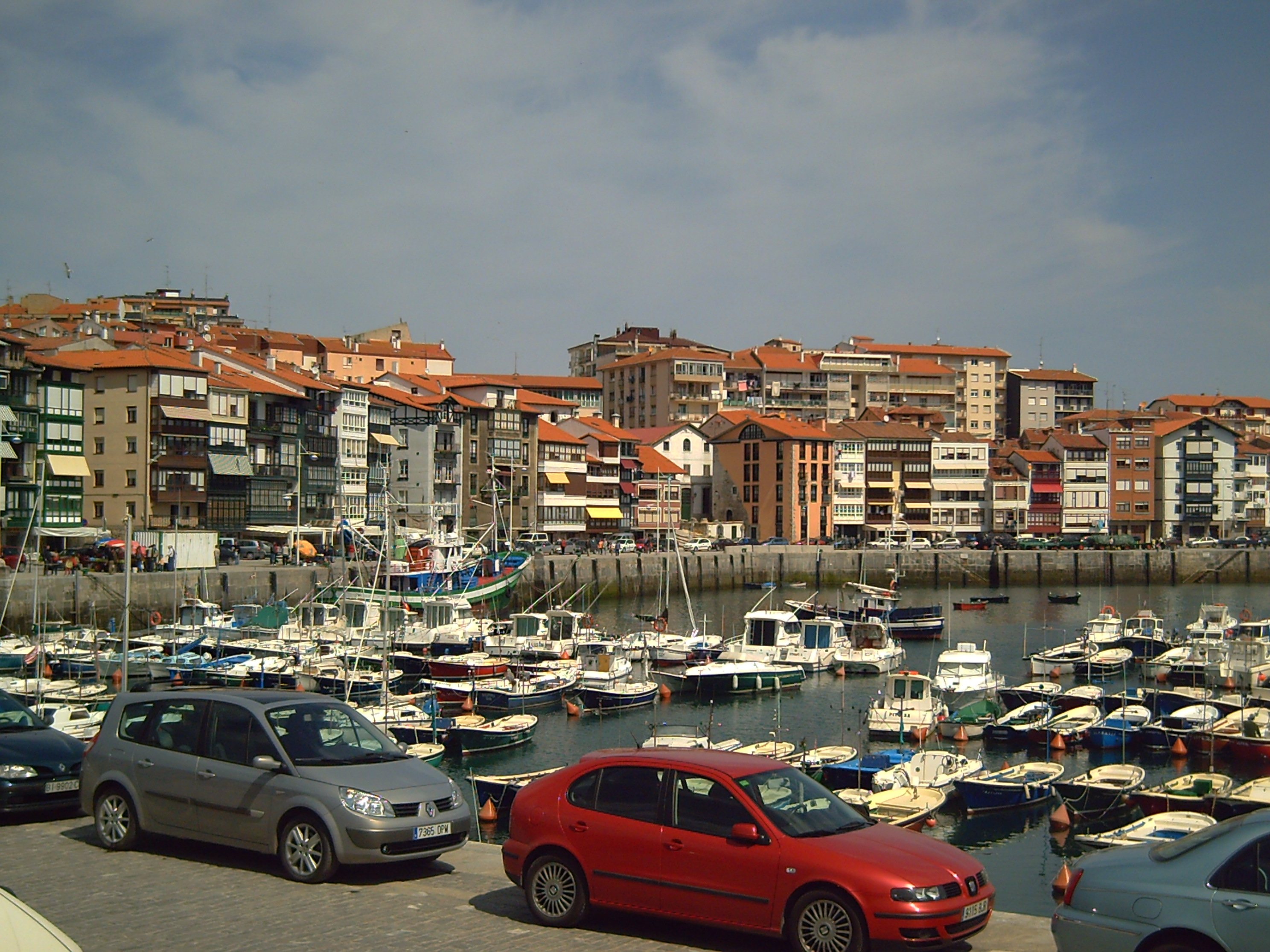
Port of Lekeitio

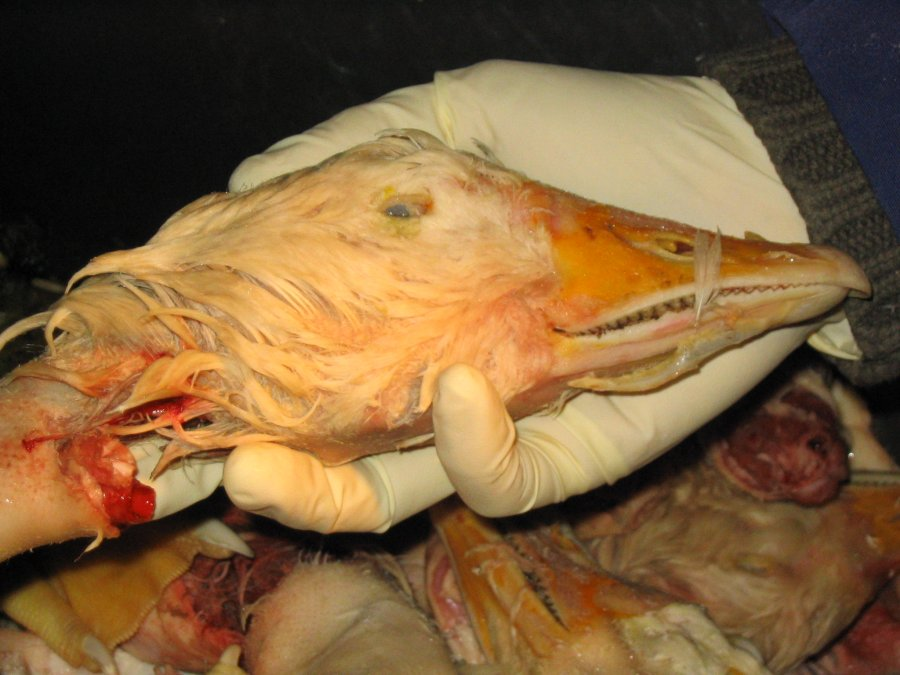
A Goose Head

The Day of the Geese, also known as Antzar Eguna, is a competition held as part of the San Antolín festival in the Basque fishing-town of Lekeitio, in which participants attempt to decapitate a goose suspended on a rope above the town harbor. Chicken are also often used.

As their boats pass underneath, young men attempt to jump off and grab the goose (which has been coated in grease) and remove its head. To add to the challenge, spectators on either side of the harbor pull the rope taut and then let it fall slack, dunking the participant in the bay. This is repeated until either the young man has been shaken loose – in which case the next participant takes his place – or he has successfully removed the head of the goose. Any dispute as to who has won is resolved by a rowing race around San Nicolas Island in the middle of Lekeitio Bay. As a prize, the winner of the competition gets to keep the goose.

== History ==
=== Origins ===
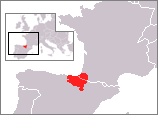
Basque Country

The Basque Country, or Euskal Herria, consists of seven regions straddling the border between Spain and France on the coast of the Bay of Biscay near the Western end of the Pyrenees mountains. Lekeitio is located in the province of Vizcaya or Bizkaia. The Basque population is currently around three million. They are considered to be Europe's oldest culture, having record of inhabiting their current region in 77 B.C. Some believe that due to physical differences between Basques and other Europeans, such as unique cranial differences, that Basques are direct descendants of the Stone Age inhabitants of the Pyrenees Mountains. The extended history and unique culture of this people has been well preserved in modern times. While the rest of Spain no longer holds this competition as a part of the San Antolin festival, the Basques have kept this tradition alive, except for the geese, which nowadays are dead before being used in the festival.

At this festival and others many games and contests are held which reveal the competitive spirit of the Basques. Traditional athletic competitions and games reflect the demanding physical tasks of everyday life for early Basques. For example, wood chopping and stone-lifting competitions derived from such tasks as chopping firewood and mining. These tasks and athletic contests require strength and endurance, hence the value placed on these attributes in Basque society, and hence the obvious focus on strength and endurance in the Day of the Geese competition. The tradition is said to come from when fishermen from the port caught the animals while out at sea and competed amongst each other to take them home.

=== San Antolin Festival ===
Catholicism, brought to the Basques by Christian missionaries, replaced early pagan beliefs in the 4th and 5th Centuries. Most of the festivals and banquets are held in celebration of a particular Saint in the Catholic Church. The Antzar Eguna used to be held during the Andra Mari or San Roque festival until 1877. The event also used to be held in the village square using horses in place of boats until 1722 when they started doing it in the harbor. This festival is known to have been celebrated for the past 350 years from 1 September through the 8th.

== Culture ==
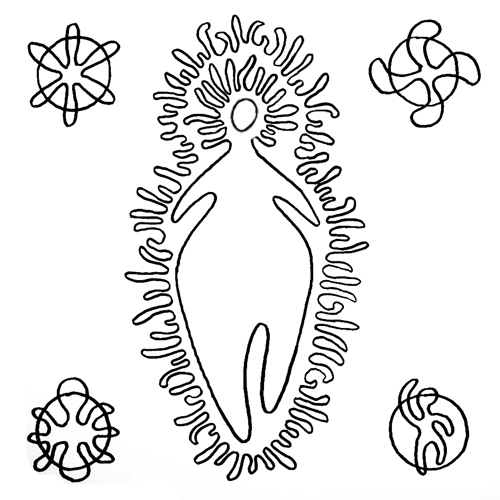
Mari, goddess of Basque Mythology

=== Gender ===
In contrast to other traditional European societies which very much functioned on a patriarchal system, early Basques functioned on a more matriarchal system. Women could own property and hold leadership positions and were even "head of the lineage" in their families. There was much more equality between the sexes than most anywhere else at that time. However, most of the strenuous physical labor was the responsibility of the males. This explains why males are the sole competitors in the Antzar Eguna. This competition was also a way for young men to prove their strength and eligibility to the young women of the town.

=== Animals ===
Unlike many European societies, most of the land belonged to farmers and not to the Church or King. Therefore, the traditional Basque occupations were agricultural, such as farming and sheepherding. Dependence on the weather for successful turnouts in their crops resulted in a pagan belief system centered on the weather and other elements of nature, such as animals. The main goddess Mari and her consort Sugaar, were believed to often take on the forms of various animals. With the introduction of Christianity these beliefs faded, but animals still have cultural significance and symbolism.

== Animal rights concerns ==
Animal rights advocates object to the many Spanish traditions that involve the death of an animal as a form of amusement. While most often targeting bullfighting, Antzar Eguna has been attacked as well and as a result dead geese are now used in place of live ones. It is particularly offensive to some due to the mutilation of the goose involved. While holding the event with a dead goose protects the animal from prolonged suffering, the practice is still controversial. Those in favor of allowing the practice to continue argue that it is a part of Basque culture. Those opposed to the practice believe that humaneness should take precedence over tradition.

== See also ==
- Goose pulling
