= 1976 Tour de Suisse =

Race details
- Dates: 9–18 June 1976
- Stages: 9 + Prologue
- Distance: 1,457 km (905.3 mi)
- Winning time: 39h 09' 02"

Results
	Winner	Hennie Kuiper (NED)	(TI–Raleigh–Campagnolo)
	Second	Michel Pollentier (BEL)	(Flandria–Velda–West Vlaams Vleesbedrijf)
	Third	José Pesarrodona (ESP)	(Kas–Campagnolo)
	Points	Freddy Maertens (BEL)	(Flandria–Velda–West Vlaams Vleesbedrijf)
	Mountains	José Freitas Martins (POR)	(Kas–Campagnolo)
	Combination	Freddy Maertens (BEL)	(Flandria–Velda–West Vlaams Vleesbedrijf)
	Team	TI–Raleigh–Campagnolo	

The 1976 Tour de Suisse was the 40th edition of the Tour de Suisse cycle race and was held from 9 June to 18 June 1976. The race started and finished in Murten. The race was won by Hennie Kuiper of the TI–Raleigh team.

== General classification ==
Final general classification

Rank	Rider	Team	Time
1	Hennie Kuiper (NED)	TI–Raleigh–Campagnolo	39h 09' 02"
2	Michel Pollentier (BEL)	Flandria–Velda–West Vlaams Vleesbedrijf	+ 42"
3	José Pesarrodona (ESP)	Kas–Campagnolo	+ 1' 23"
4	José Freitas Martins (POR)	Kas–Campagnolo	+ 1' 41"
5	Bert Pronk (NED)	TI–Raleigh–Campagnolo	+ 1' 46"
6	André Romero (FRA)	Jobo–Spidel–Wolber–La France	+ 2' 07"
7	Freddy Maertens (BEL)	Flandria–Velda–West Vlaams Vleesbedrijf	+ 5' 14"
8	Dietrich Thurau (FRG)	TI–Raleigh–Campagnolo	+ 8' 00"
9	Ferdinand Julien (FRA)	Lejeune–BP	+ 10' 01"
10	Enrique Martínez Heredia (ESP)	Kas–Campagnolo	+ 12' 09"
