= 1979 Tour de Suisse =

Race details
- Dates: 13–22 June 1979
- Stages: 11 + Prologue
- Distance: 1,622 km (1,008 mi)
- Winning time: 42h 56' 59"

Results
	Winner	Wilfried Wesemael (BEL)	(TI–Raleigh–McGregor)
	Second	Rudy Pevenage (BEL)	(IJsboerke–Warncke Eis)
	Third	Leonardo Mazzantini (ITA)	(Zonca)
	Points	Wilfried Wesemael (BEL)	(TI–Raleigh–McGregor)
	Mountains	Giovanni Battaglin (ITA)	(Inoxpran)
	Combination	Wilfried Wesemael (BEL)	(TI–Raleigh–McGregor)
	Team	TI–Raleigh–McGregor	

The 1979 Tour de Suisse was the 43rd edition of the Tour de Suisse cycle race and was held from 13 June to 22 June 1979. The race started in Zürich and finished in Hendschiken. The race was won by Wilfried Wesemael of the TI–Raleigh team.

== General classification ==
Final general classification

Rank	Rider	Team	Time
1	Wilfried Wesemael (BEL)	TI–Raleigh–McGregor	42h 56' 59"
2	Rudy Pevenage (BEL)	IJsboerke–Warncke Eis	+ 4' 43"
3	Leonardo Mazzantini (ITA)	Zonca	+ 5' 11"
4	Josef Fuchs (SUI)	Scic–Bottecchia	+ 6' 47"
5	Ennio Vanotti (ITA)	Zonca	+ 6' 54"
6	Ueli Sutter (SUI)	TI–Raleigh–McGregor	+ 7' 01"
7	Sebastián Pozo (ESP)	Transmallorca–Flavia–Gios	+ 7' 16"
8	Henk Lubberding (NED)	TI–Raleigh–McGregor	+ 8' 32"
9	Giovanni Battaglin (ITA)	Inoxpran	+ 10' 00"
10	Paul Wellens (BEL)	TI–Raleigh–McGregor	+ 14' 29"
