= Gunda Beeg =

German reformer and editor

Gunda Beeg *(1858-1913) was one of the founding members of the women's dress reform movement in late 19th early 20th century Germany.

== Biography ==
Beeg came from a family of action takers. Her grandfather was the founder of the Germanic Museum in Nuremberg, Baron Aufsess. Her father was the director of the Kunstgewerbe, Nuremberg Museum of Industrial Arts, and her mother was the founder of the School for Women's Work in Nuremberg. It is in said school that Beeg attained all her training.

When her time came, Beeg helped found the first German organization for the improvement of women's dress. She and other dress reformers were interested in not only the aesthetic and practical evolution of clothing but also in thinking of women's emancipation through the clothing they wore.

The German telephone and postal service employed over 25,000 women in their organization. These women were expected to wear a blouse as part of their mandatory uniform, which, due to its design, required them to wear corsets underneath. A union was formed in 1912, Union of Women Telephone and Telegraph Employees, that partnered with the Berlin office of the dress reform organization in order to help get an improved uniform introduced. The proposed reformed blouse was both designed and executed by Beeg. Once the design was complete, one of the larger telephone exchanges tried it out for a year by making it an “optional alternative to the old-fashioned ‘squeezer.' The young women preferred it so overwhelmingly that it was officially adopted as a civil service uniform at the end of the trial year.”

== Publications ==
In addition to all her work in dress reform, Beeg also produced a textbook, in a series of volumes, on the fashion world called Lehrbücher der Modenwelt. She collaborated with Hedwig Lechner on the project.
