= Grevenbicht =

- Village
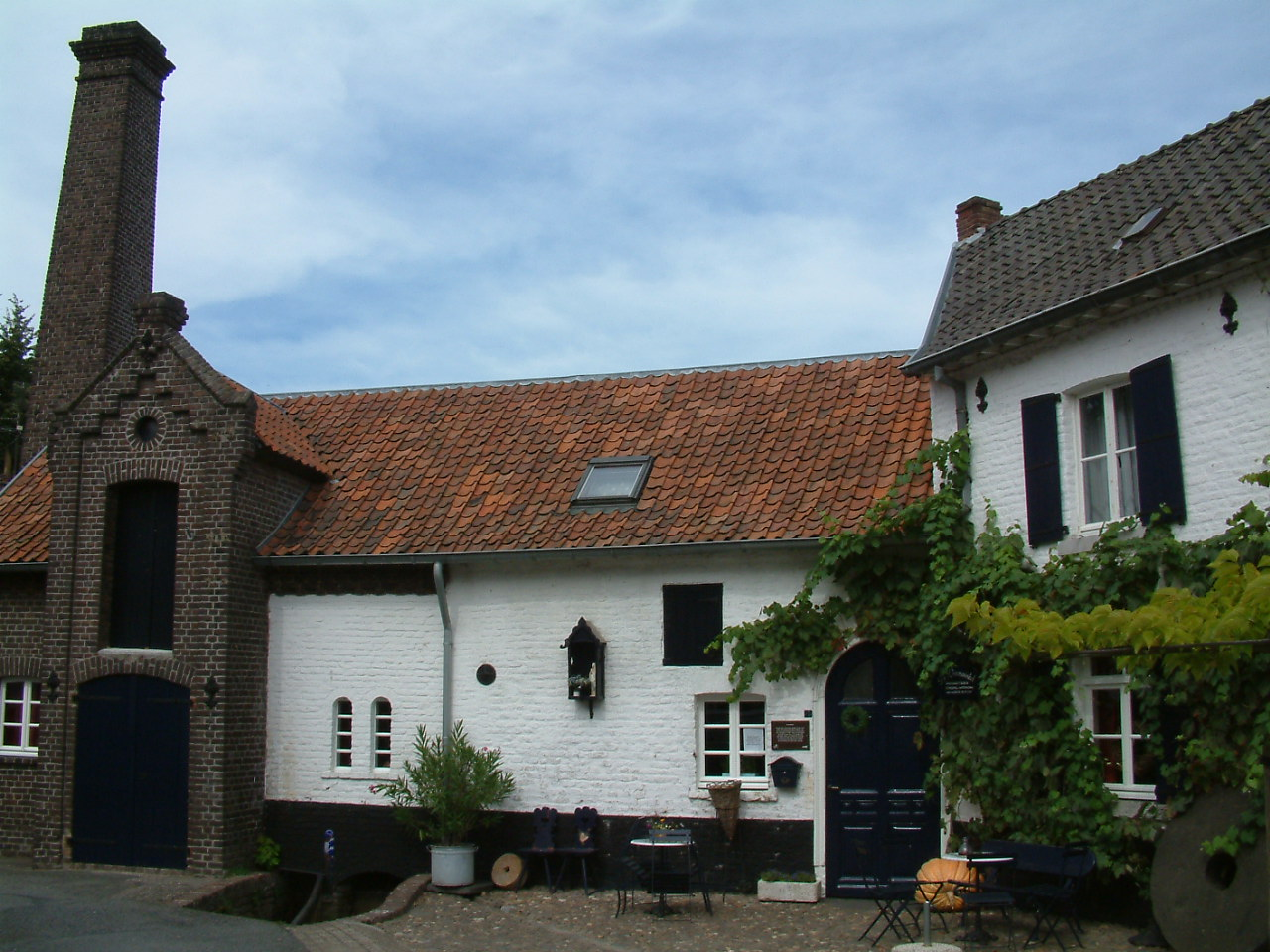
- Watermill in Grevenbicht

- Flag Coat of arms

- Location in the Netherlands Location in the province of Limburg in the Netherlands
- Coordinates: 51°02′20″N 5°46′30″E
- Country: Netherlands
- Province: Limburg
- Municipality: Sittard-Geleen

Area
  - Total: 3.56 km^{2} (1.37 sq mi)
- Elevation: 32 m (105 ft)

Population (2021)
  - Total: 2,305
  - Density: 647/km^{2} (1,680/sq mi)
- Time zone: UTC+1 (CET)
  - Summer (DST): UTC+2 (CEST)
- Postal code: 6127
- Dialing code: 046

Grevenbicht (Dutch pronunciation: [ˈɣreːvə(m)bɪxt]; Limburgish: Beeg [ˈbeːx]) is a village in the south-eastern Netherlands. It is located in the municipality of Sittard-Geleen, Limburg, about 8 km north-west of Sittard, on the east bank of the Meuse river.

In 1982, the municipality of Grevenbicht was merged with Born.

== Culture ==
In Grevenbicht 'goose pulling' is part of the traditional Shrove Tuesday celebrations. From 2013 to 2016, the autism-friendly one-day Bluegrass Beeg festival was held in October, attracting musicians from countries in Europe and around the world. Bluegrass Beeg was organized by Foundation Autism Friendly Limburg.

== Notable people ==
- Rob Bontje, volleyball player (born 1981)
- Ben Koken, racing cyclist (born 1950)
- Chel Savelkoul, lyricist, director, composer and singer (1924–2003)
