= Luc Leman =

Belgian former cyclist (born 1953)

Personal information
- Born: 30 April 1953 (age 73) Ledegem, Belgium

Cycling career
- Sport: Cycling
- Role: Rider

Professional teams
- 1974–1976: MIC–Ludo–de Gribaldy
- 1977: IJsboerke–Colnago
- 1978: Marc Zeepcentrale–Superia
- 1979: Flandria–Ça va seul

Luc Leman (born 30 April 1953) is a Belgian former cyclist, who was professional from 1974 until 1979. He most notably won a stage of the 1975 Vuelta a España as well as the Nokere Koerse in 1976. He is the brother of cyclist Eric Leman.

== Major results ==
1974
2nd Overall Tour du Loir-et-Cher
3rd Circuit de Wallonie
1975
1st Stage 5 Vuelta a España
5th Grote Prijs Jef Scherens
6th Dwars door België
10th Overall Tour Méditerranéen
1976
1st Nokere Koerse
3rd Amstel Gold Race
3rd Omloop van Midden-Brabant
4th Overall Étoile de Bessèges

1st Stages 3, 4 & 6

5th Omloop Het Volk
7th Dwars door België
9th Overall Tour Méditerranéen
1977
2nd Dwars door België
6th E3 Harelbeke
1978
1st Omloop van de Westhoek
1st Stage 1 Tour Méditerranéen
1979
1st Stage 2a Tour Méditerranéen
