= Wilfried Wesemael =

Belgian cyclist (1950–2026)

- Wesemael in 1982

Personal information
- Full name: Wilfried Wesemael
- Born: 31 January 1950 Aalst, Belgium
- Died: 2 September 2026 (aged 76) Lebbeke, Belgium

Cycling career
- Sport: Cycling
- Discipline: Road
- Role: Rider

Professional teams
- 1973: Rokado–De Gribaldy
- 1974–1976: MIC–Ludo–de Gribaldy
- 1977: Frisol–Thirion–Gazelle
- 1978–1981: TI–Raleigh–McGregor
- 1982: Safir–Marc

Major wins
- Grand Tours Vuelta a España 1 individual stage (1975) Stage races Tour de Suisse (1979) One-day races and Classics Kuurne–Brussels–Kuurne (1974)

Wilfried Wesemael (31 January 1950 – 2 September 2026) was a Belgian professional racing cyclist. He won the 1979 Tour de Suisse. He also competed in the individual and team pursuit events at the 1972 Summer Olympics.

Wesemael died in Lebbeke on 2 September 2026, at the age of 76.

== Major results ==
=== Road ===
1974
1st Kuurne–Brussels–Kuurne
2nd Elfstedenronde
2nd Omloop van het Leiedal
2nd Brussels–Meulebeke
5th Rund um den Henninger Turm
6th Grand Prix Cerami
10th Tour of Flanders
1975
1st Stage 1 Vuelta a España
7th Omloop van het Waasland
10th Nokere Koerse
1976
5th Grand Prix de Fourmies
7th Overall Paris–Nice
10th Milan–San Remo
10th Omloop Het Volk
1977
1st Prologue (TTT) Three Days of De Panne
2nd Overall Tour Méditerranéen

1st Prologue (TTT)

2nd Grote Prijs Jef Scherens
3rd Milan–San Remo
3rd Acht van Chaam
5th E3 Prijs Vlaanderen
10th Omloop Het Volk
1978
1st Grand Prix de Cannes
1st Stage 4 (TTT) Tour de France
2nd Overall Tour de Luxembourg
3rd Grand Prix Cerami
4th GP Monaco
4th Wattrelos–Meulebeke
6th GP Antibes
7th Overall Three Days of De Panne
7th Overall Tour Méditerranéen
1979
1st Overall Tour de Suisse

1st Points classification

1st Stage 7 Critérium du Dauphiné Libéré
6th Liedekerkse Pijl
1980
5th Overall Tour Méditerranéen
1981
1st Stage 5 (TTT) Tour of Belgium
9th Overall Four Days of Dunkirk

=== Track ===
1973
3rd Belgian National Track Championships Derny
1981
3rd Belgian National Track Championships Derny
