= Albert Hulzebosch =

Dutch cyclist

Personal information
- Born: 7 July 1949 (age 77)

Cycling career
- Sport: Cycling
- Role: Rider

Albert Hulzebosch (born 7 July 1949) is a Dutch racing cyclist. He rode in the 1974 Tour de France.
