= André Delcroix =

Belgian cyclist

Personal information
- Born: 20 September 1953 (age 73) Hoogstraten, Belgium

Cycling career
- Sport: Cycling
- Role: Rider

André Delcroix (born 20 September 1953) is a Belgian former racing cyclist. He won the Tour de Pologne in 1974.
