= Cambrils =

- Municipality
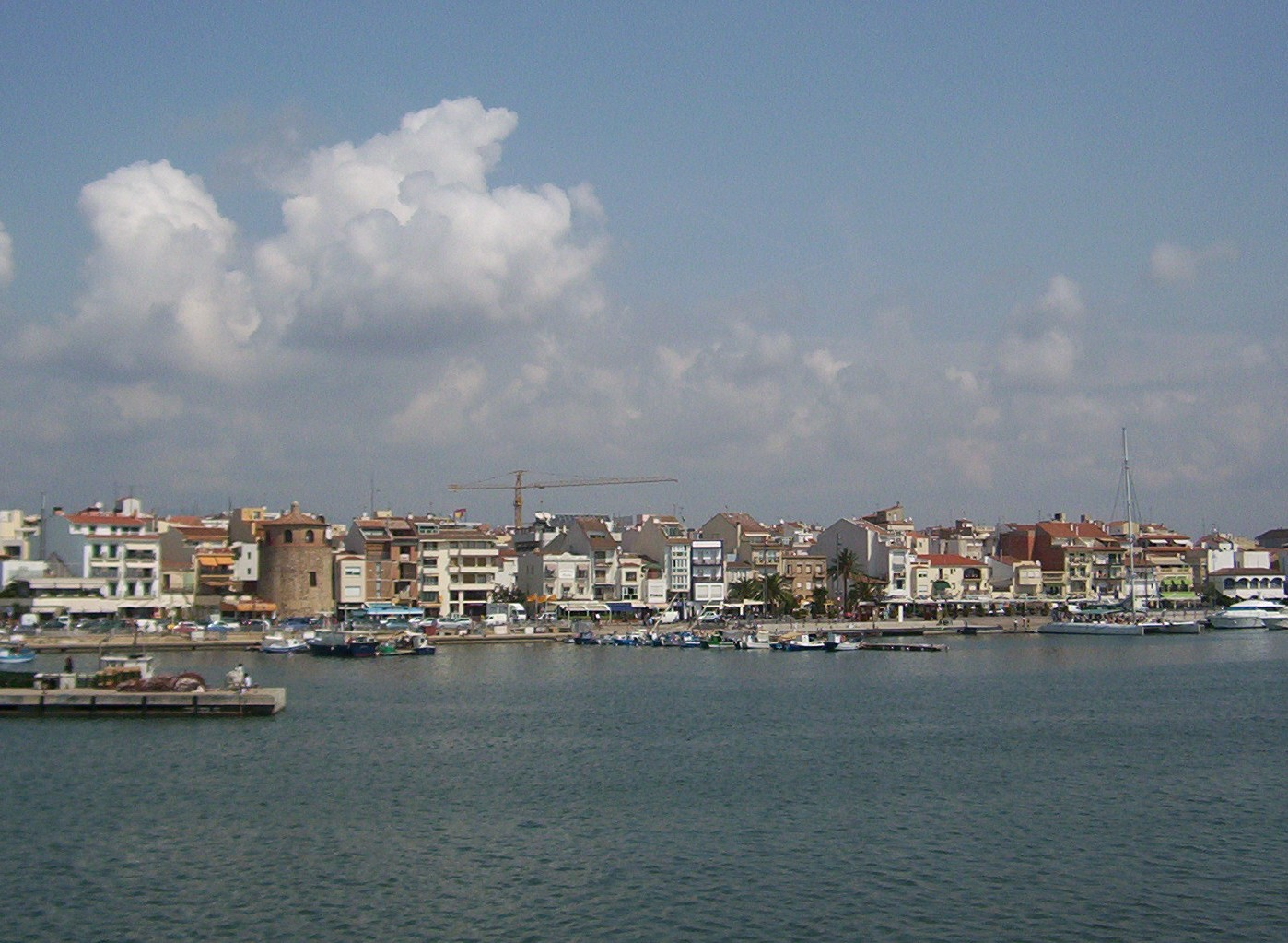
- Cambrils as seen from the sea

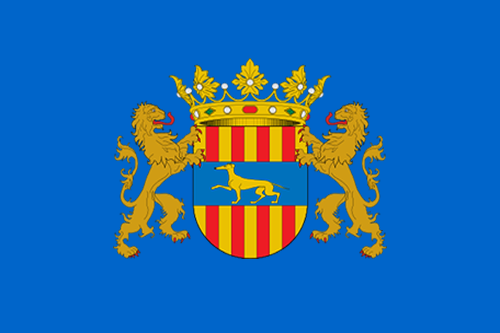
- Flag Coat of arms

- Location in Catalonia Cambrils (Catalonia) Cambrils (Spain)
- Coordinates: 41°04′00″N 1°03′30″E
- Country: Spain
- Community: Catalonia
- Province: Tarragona
- Comarca: Baix Camp

Government
  - Mayor: Camí Mendoza Mercè (2015)

Area
  - Total: 35.2 km^{2} (13.6 sq mi)
- Elevation: 18 m (59 ft)

Population (2025-01-01)
  - Total: 37,042
  - Density: 1,050/km^{2} (2,730/sq mi)
- Demonym: Cambrilenc
- Postal code: 43850
- Website: www.cambrils.cat

Cambrils (Catalan pronunciation: [kəmˈbɾils]) is a coastal resort town in the comarca of Baix Camp, province of Tarragona, Catalonia, Spain. The town is near the tourist town Salou and is frequently visited by those travelling by air using Reus Airport. It has a population of 37,042 (register office, 2025).

== History ==
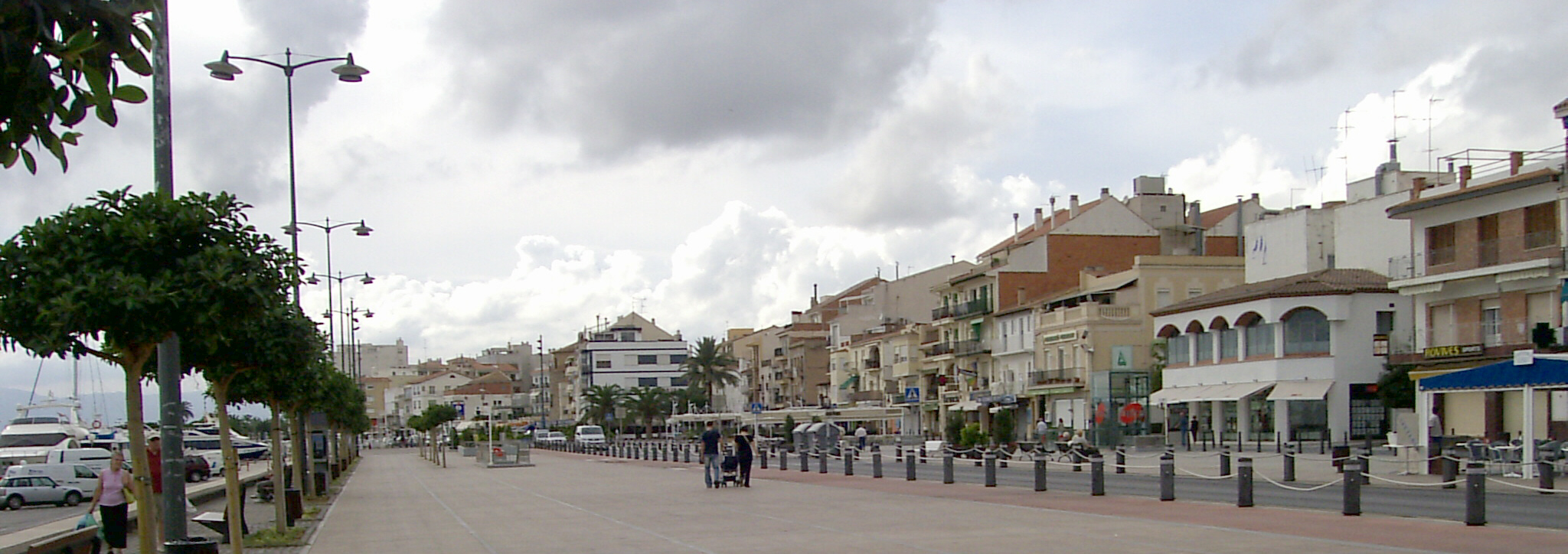
Port.

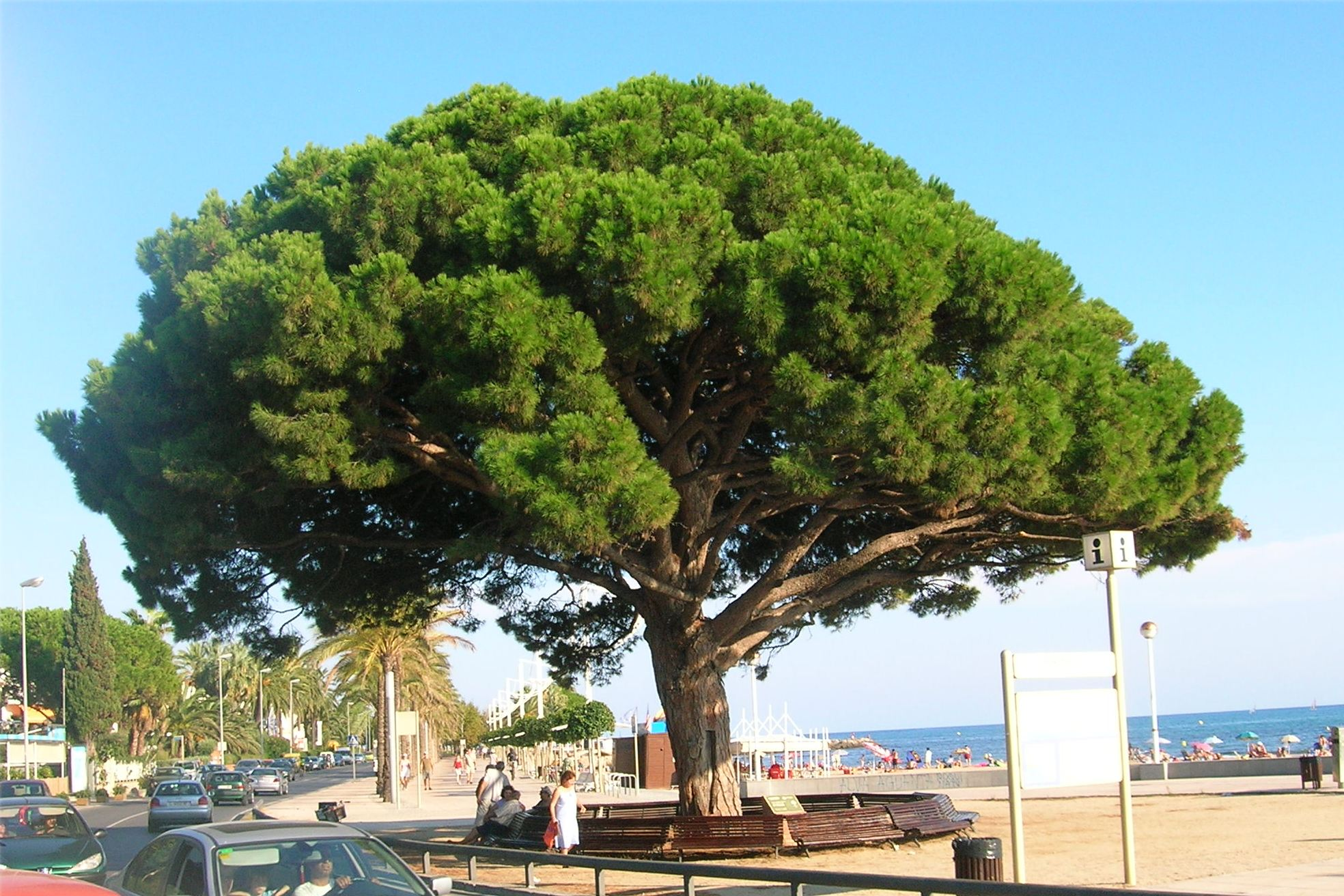
Pi Rodó pine beside a beach.

=== Roman Empire to Middle Ages ===
The town of Cambrils can trace its origins back to prehistoric times, although it was not until the Roman Empire period that the present town of Cambrils began to grow. This is evident from the archaeological sites found throughout the municipality, such as the Roman villa of La Llosa, strategically located alongside the Via Augusta and not far from the Roman capital of Tarraco.

By the mediaeval period, there was already a permanent settlement on the right bank of the Alforja Torrent. From 1152, the County of Barcelona, having driven the Moors out of Catalonia, granted a series of privileges to encourage the repopulation of the place known as Cambrils. It was in the 12th century that the foundations were laid for the establishment of a stable population centre here at the southern gateway to the Camp de Tarragona, well connected to El Camino Real (the Royal Road) that linked Tortosa and Tarragona. The area also had good maritime connections; indeed, the troops of Jaume I sailed from these beaches in 1229 to re-conquer Mallorca from the Moors.

Due to this strategic position, the Crown kept title over the town by establishing a feudal lord—vassal to the king-count—and a detachment of soldiers here. In addition, they built defensive walls and towers that also served to protect other nearby villages such as Els Tegells, Les Planes and Montbrió. This royal initiative lead to the development of the present-day Old Town, with a church, hostel, hermitage, hospital, convent, market, fair, artisans, and, above all, farmers who worked the rich lands surrounding Cambrils.

However, the vitality of the community was severely disrupted in December 1640 when the town of Cambrils was the site of one of the episodes of the Reapers' War (Guerra dels Segadors) that brought Catalonia into conflict with King Philip IV of Spain. Faced with a far superior army, the population of Cambrils withstood a siege that lasted three days, before they finally capitulated. Contrary to the agreed terms of surrender, the occupying troops killed a large number of the defenders and destroyed most of the town walls. This is one of the most important events in the town's history and it is commemorated every year by a ceremony held in the Plaça del Setge (Siege Square), in front of the ruins of the walls.

From the 18th century the population began to increase, as can be seen from the establishment of workers' neighbourhoods outside the walled area. At the same time, the coastal area, now the port quarter of Cambrils, was also occupied, thanks to the construction of the Port or Moors' Tower. For centuries living on the seashore had been fraught with danger, due to constant pirate attacks. Fishermen and others who did not have time to flee to the shelter of the walled town were often killed or kidnapped. Other small mediaeval villages such as Mas d'en Bisbe, Vilagrassa and Vilafortuny, the latter of which had its own castle and church, also suffered the ravages of the pirates, which impeded the growth of their populations, a situation that did not change until they were annexed to the municipality of Cambrils in the 19th century. Over time, and with the danger largely a thing of the past, the families of fishermen and seafarers began to build their houses around the Port or Moors' Tower, thus founding the quarter that, a century later, would see the construction of the harbour, which was finished in the mid 20th century and is now the best known symbol of Cambrils.

In addition to the production of flour in the town's numerous water-driven mills, from the 19th century on small industries began to develop. These included liqueur producers, brick and building material factories, and boatyards building increasingly large vessels. The opening of the railway in 1867 gave a considerable boost to the town's commerce, agriculture and fishing, despite a series of wars, epidemics, and meteorological disasters suffered during the 19th century. The 20th century brought with it the beginning of an increase in population that would be multiplied in the 1950s with the arrival of various waves of immigration from other parts of Spain.

At the beginning of the 1960s the potential of tourism to the town was realized and began to be exploited. Large estates were built to house these new arrivals, who mainly came to enjoy the Mediterranean sun, beach and cuisine.

At dawn on August 18, 2017, an Audi A-3 with five terrorists drove into the crowd that was walking along the Cambrils seafront. Subsequently, the car overturned, the terrorists got out and began stabbing passersby. The five terrorists were killed by the Mossos d'Esquadra, leaving one woman dead in their wake and six other people injured, three of them police officers. Later it became apparent that the cell killed in Cambrils had a connection with the attack the day before in Las Ramblas in Barcelona.

== Economy ==
The city, along with the rest of the region around Tarragona, has enjoyed very rapid development over the last two decades. The town's fishing and agriculture background is being replaced by such emerging industries as chemical, petrochemical, services and tourism. These, in turn, have spurred large-scale development, leading to major investments in infrastructure and an increased standard of living. Today, most of the tourists to this area are Spaniards, who have their summer house at this fishing village with high quality beaches.

The Agriculture Cooperative of Cambrils was founded at 1902. Nowadays it is the agriculture and food industry reference around Camp de Tarragona. The local farmers produce fruits, vegetables, and arbequina olives, from which is made the well-known Extra Virgin Olive Oil PDO Siurana. This product has been awarded as Best Olive Oil of Spain in Fruity Category by the Agriculture Ministry of Spain and Best Olive Oil Mill of Spain (2005–2006) awarded by the Spanish Association of Municipalities of the Olive Tree (AEMO).

== Tourism ==
=== Sights ===
The main sights are:

- Molí de les Tres Eres – The main building of the Cambrils Museum of History.
- Museu Agrícola de Cambrils – Agricultural museum of Cambrils
- Torre de l'Ermita – Chapel Tower
- Torre del Port – Port Tower
- Ermita de la Mare de Déu del Camí – Chapel
- El Parc del Pescador – Fisherman's park
- El Parc del Pinaret – The newest and largest park.

=== Beaches ===
The beaches are:

- Eastern beaches:
  - Cap de St. Pere
  - Vilafortuny
  - Esquirol
  - The Cavet
  - Prat d'en Forés – Regueral
- Western beaches:
  - La Riera
  - Horta de Sta. Maria
  - La Llosa
  - L'Ardiaca

=== Hiking ===
The GR 92 long distance footpath, which roughly follows the length of the Mediterranean coast of Spain, has a staging point at Cambrils. Stage 26 links northwards to Tarragona, a distance of 28.1 kilometres (17.5 mi), whilst stage 27 links southwards to L'Hospitalet de l'Infant, a distance of 16.3 kilometres (10.1 mi).

== Notable people ==
- Francisco Vidal (1868–1943), cardinal, Archbishop of Tarragona

== See also ==
- 2017 Barcelona attacks
- 2025 Torneo de Baloncesto de Cambrils
