= Marino Basso =

Italian cyclist

- Basso in 1969

Personal information
- Full name: Marino Basso
- Born: 1 June 1945 (age 81) Caldogno, Italy

Cycling career
- Sport: Cycling
- Discipline: Road
- Role: Rider
- Rider type: Sprinter

Professional teams
- 1966–1967: Mainetti
- 1968–1971: Molteni
- 1972: Salvarani
- 1973–1974: Bianchi–Campagnolo
- 1975: Magniflex
- 1976: Furzi–Vibor
- 1977: Selle Royal
- 1978: Gis Gelati

Major wins
- Grand Tours Tour de France 6 individual stages (1967, 1969, 1970) Giro d'Italia Points classification (1971) 15 individual stages (1966, 1968–1974, 1977) Vuelta a España 6 individual stages (1975) One-day races and Classics World Road Race Championships (1972)
Medal record
Representing Italy
Men's road bicycle racing
World Championships
Gold medal – first place	1972 Gap	Road Race

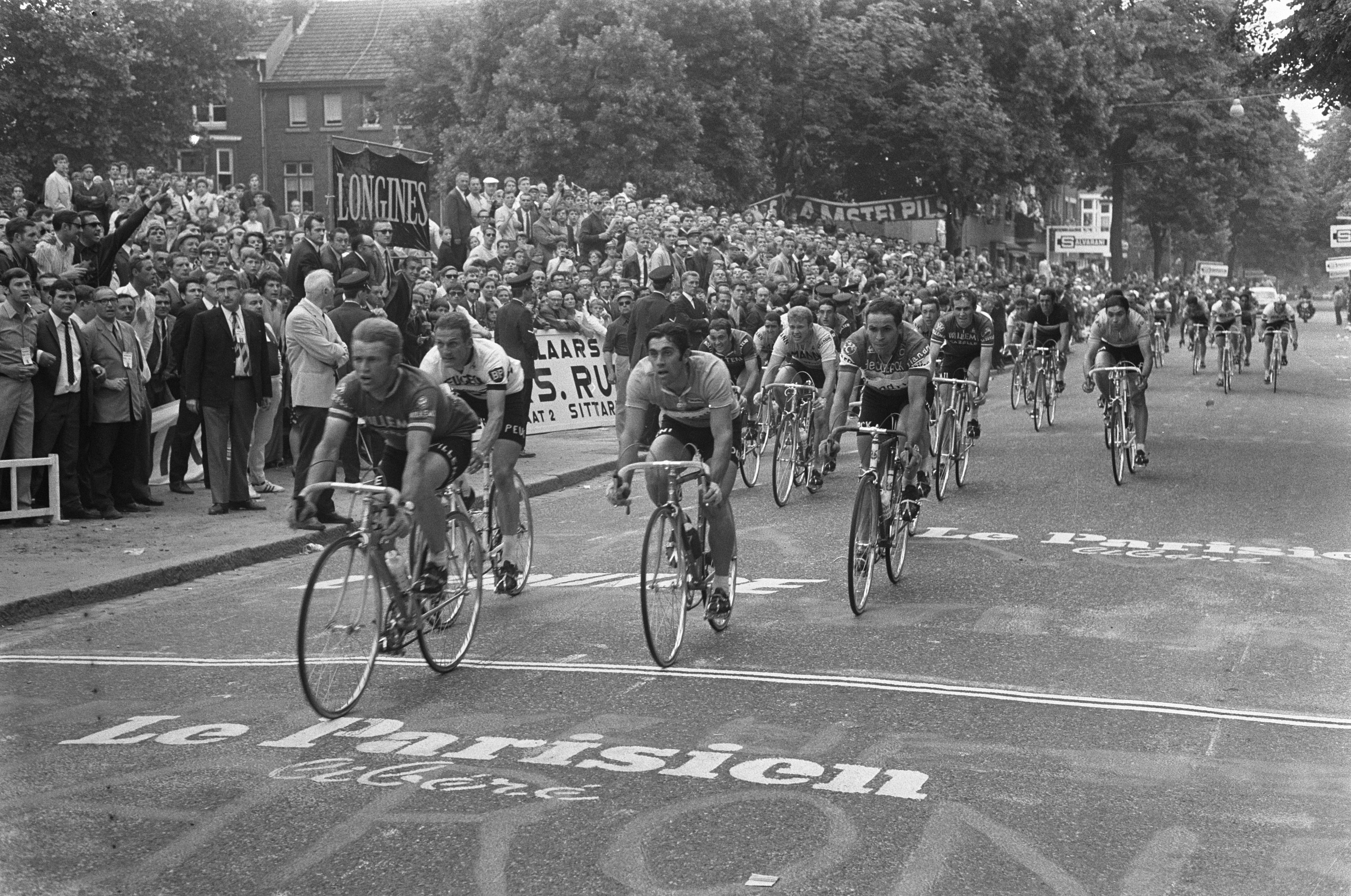
Tour de France 1969, stage 2, in Maastricht: Basso finishing second in the peloton, behind Harm Ottenbros.

Marino Basso (born 1 June 1945) is an Italian former professional road racing cyclist, considered one of the best sprinters of his generation. He won the World Cycling Championship in 1972.

Basso was born at Rettorgole di Caldogno, in the Veneto. He was one of the main sprinters of the 1970s, often duelling with Belgians Patrick Sercu, Guido Reybroeck and Roger de Vlaeminck, and fellow Italian Dino Zandegù.

Basso won a total of 15 stages at the Giro d'Italia, 6 at the Tour de France and 6 at the Vuelta a España. He was Giro d'Italia's points classification winner in 1971 and the Italian national champion in 1972.

He is not related to Italian cyclist Ivan Basso, but his brother Alcide founded Basso Bikes.

After his professional career, Basso became a manager at a number of teams, including Preti Mangimi.

== Major results ==
1966
1st Stage 8 Giro d'Italia
3rd Milano–Vignola
9th Road race, National Road Championships
1967
Tour de France

1st Stages 3 & 18
Held after Stage 3

2nd Giro del Veneto
2nd Gran Premio Industria e Commercio di Prato
4th Coppa Placci
9th Giro di Campania
1968
1st Milano–Vignola
1st Stage 15 Giro d'Italia
2nd Overall Paris–Luxembourg
3rd Züri–Metzgete
3rd Giro di Toscana
4th Overall Giro di Sardegna

1st Stage 6

4th Tre Valli Varesine
5th Giro di Campania
6th Road race, National Road Championships
1969
1st Tre Valli Varesine
1st Trofeo Matteotti
1st Giro del Piemonte
1st Giro di Campania
Tour de France

1st Stages 1a
Held after Stages 1a–5

Giro d'Italia

1st Stages 8, 13, 18a & 18b

Paris–Nice

1st Points classification
1st Stage 7a

3rd Milan–San Remo
3rd Tour of Flanders
3rd Giro del Lazio
4th Coppa Bernocchi
4th Milano–Vignola
10th Coppa Agostoni
10th Sassari-Cagliari
1970
Tour de France

1st Stages 3b, 11b & 21

Giro d'Italia

1st Stages 4 & 15

1st Stage 2a Tour de Luxembourg
1st Stage 4 Paris–Luxembourg
3rd Road race, National Road Championships
3rd Giro del Veneto
3rd Coppa Bernocchi
3rd Coppa Agostoni
4th Paris–Tours
4th Giro del Lazio
6th Giro dell'Emilia
6th Giro della Romagna
7th Coppa Placci
9th Milano–Vignola
10th Coppa Sabatini
10th Gran Premio Città di Camaiore
1971
1st Milano–Vignola
Giro d'Italia

1st Points classification
1st Stages 1, 9 & 11
Held after Stage 1

2nd Paris–Tours
3rd Paris–Roubaix
3rd Giro di Campania
4th Coppa Agostoni
5th Giro del Lazio
7th Tre Valli Varesine
7th Coppa Placci
8th Gent–Wevelgem
9th Trofeo Matteotti
10th Road race, National Road Championships
1972
1st Road race, UCI Road World Championships
1st Overall Giro di Sardegna

1st Stages 2a & 2b

1st Coppa Bernocchi
Giro d'Italia

1st Stage 1
Held & after Stages 1 & 2

2nd Tre Valli Varesine
3rd Milan–San Remo
7th Giro di Puglia
7th Sassari-Cagliari
8th Giro di Campania
1973
1st Milano–Vignola
1st Grand Prix of Aargau Canton
1st Genoa–Nice
1st Stage 20 Giro d'Italia
Tirreno–Adriatico

1st Stages 1 & 4b

2nd Sassari-Cagliari
6th Coppa Sabatini
7th Overall Giro di Puglia
8th Trofeo Laigueglia
1974
1st GP Montelupo
1st Stage 22 Giro d'Italia
3rd Road race, National Road Championships
6th Milan–San Remo
8th Trofeo Matteotti
9th Coppa Bernocchi
1975
Vuelta a España

1st Stages 4, 6, 8, 9, 10 & 11b

4th Tre Valli Varesine
6th Coppa Bernocchi
7th Milan–San Remo
1976
Tour of the Basque Country

1st Stages 2 & 5a

1st Stage 1 Volta a Catalunya
2nd Giro di Campania
1977
1st Coppa Placci
1st Stage 8b Giro d'Italia
2nd Overall Giro di Puglia

1st Stage 1

2nd Milano–Vignola
6th Overall Giro di Sardegna
1978
1st Stage 4a Tour Méditerranéen
2nd Milano–Vignola
5th Züri–Metzgete
10th Coppa Bernocchi

=== Grand Tour general classification results timeline ===
Grand Tour	1966	1967	1968	1969	1970	1971	1972	1973	1974	1975	1976	1977	1978
Vuelta a España	—	—	—	—	—	—	—	—	—	DNF	—	—	—
Giro d'Italia	48	DNF	54	47	DNF	42	DNF	84	85	DNF	84	DNF	DNF
Tour de France	—	64	—	DNF	63	—	82	—	—	—	—	—	—

=== Classics results timeline ===
Monuments results timeline
Monument	1966	1967	1968	1969	1970	1971	1972	1973	1974	1975	1976	1977	1978
Milan–San Remo	—	—	13	3	—	17	3	23	6	7	—	14	—
Tour of Flanders	—	—	18	3	—	21	—	—	—	—	—	—	—
Paris–Roubaix	—	—	—	17	—	3	34	—	—	—	—	—	—
Liège–Bastogne–Liège	Did not contest during career												
Giro di Lombardia	24	—	—	—	11	—	—	—	—	—	—	—	—

=== Major championship results timeline ===
	1966	1967	1968	1969	1970	1971	1972	1973	1974	1975	1976	1977	1978
World Championships	—	16	—	55	17	43	1	27	DNF	—	—	—	—
National Championships	9	14	6	—	3	10	—	11	3	—	—	31	—

Legend
—	Did not compete
DNF	Did not finish
