= José Freitas Martins =

Portuguese cyclist (born 1951)

Personal information
- Born: 19 September 1951 (age 75) Golães, Fafe, Portugal

Cycling career
- Sport: Cycling
- Discipline: Road
- Role: Rider
- Rider type: Climber

Professional teams
- 1971–1975: Coelima
- 1973: Canada Dry–Gazelle
- 1976–1977: Kas–Campagnolo
- 1978: Teka
- 1979: Moliner–Vereco

José Freitas Martins (born 19 September 1951) is a Portuguese former racing cyclist. He rode in four editions of the Tour de France and five editions of the Vuelta a España.

== Major results ==
1972
2nd Overall Volta a Portugal
1973
3rd Overall Volta a Portugal
1974
3rd Overall Vuelta a Asturias
4th Overall Vuelta a Mallorca

1st Prologue

5th Overall Volta a Catalunya
1975
1st Overall Vuelta a los Valles Mineros
2nd Overall Vuelta a Aragón
2nd Klasika Primavera
3rd Overall Volta a Catalunya
3rd Road race, National Road Championships
3rd Overall Escalada a Montjuïc
5th Overall Tour of the Basque Country
7th Overall Vuelta a la Comunidad Valenciana
8th Overall Vuelta a España
10th Overall Setmana Catalana de Ciclisme
1976
4th Overall Tour de Suisse
7th Overall Setmana Catalana de Ciclisme
1977
1st Clásica de Sabiñánigo
9th GP Villafranca de Ordizia
10th Overall Vuelta a Andalucía
1978
1st Stage 2a (TTT) Vuelta a Cantabria
9th GP Villafranca de Ordizia
1980
1st Stage 11 Volta a Portugal
