= Roger Loysch (cyclist, born 1951) =

Belgian cyclist

Personal information
- Full name: Roger Loysch
- Born: 13 November 1951 (age 74) Houthalen-Helchteren, Belgium

Cycling career
- Sport: Cycling
- Role: Rider

Roger Loysch (born 13 November 1951) is a former Belgian racing cyclist. He finished in last place in the 1977 Tour de France.
