= Ben Koken =

Dutch cyclist

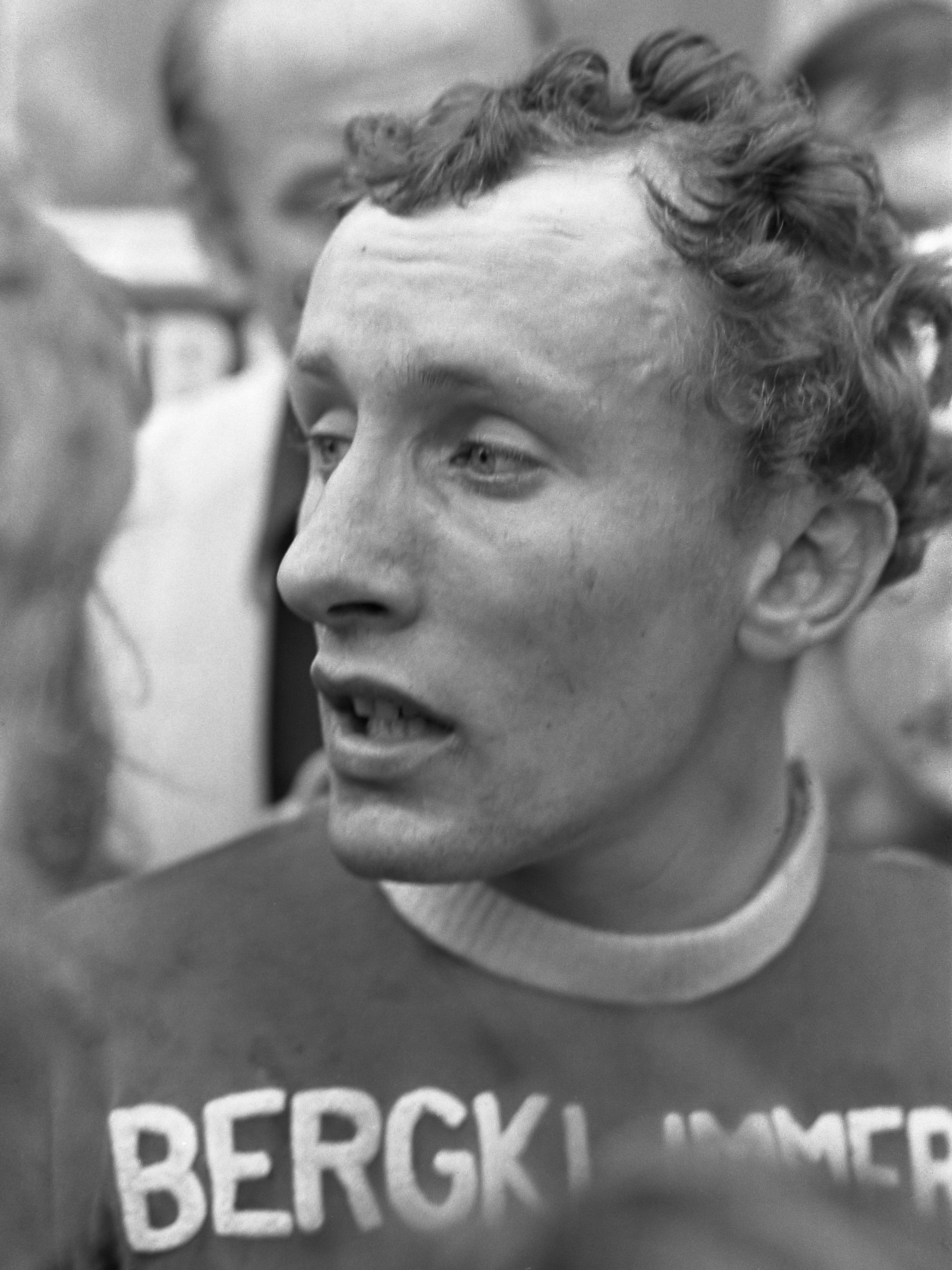

Personal information
- Born: 9 August 1950 (age 76) Grevenbicht, Limburg, Netherlands

Cycling career
- Sport: Cycling
- Role: Rider

Ben Koken (born 9 August 1950) is a Dutch racing cyclist. He rode in the 1975 Tour de France.
