= Giuseppe Perletto =

Italian cyclist

Personal information
- Born: 2 May 1948 (age 78)

Cycling career
- Sport: Cycling
- Role: Rider

Giuseppe Perletto (born 2 May 1948) is an Italian racing cyclist. He won stage 14 of the 1974 Giro d'Italia.
