= Ottavio Crepaldi =

Italian cyclist

Personal information
- Born: 21 May 1945 (age 81)

Cycling career
- Sport: Cycling
- Role: Rider

Ottavio Crepaldi (born 21 May 1945) is an Italian former racing cyclist. He rode in the 1971 Tour de France.
