= Monteverde (cycling team) =

Team information
- Registered: Spain
- Founded: 1973
- Disbanded: 1975
- Discipline: Road

Key personnel
- General manager: José Escrig; José Manuel Mateu; Julián San Emeterio

Team name history
- 1973–1974 1975: Monteverde; Monteverde–Sanson

Monteverde was a Spanish professional cycling team that existed from 1973 to 1975. The team competed in the Vuelta a España all three years of its existence and won one stage each year.

== Major wins ==
1973
Stage 9a Vuelta a España, Juan Manuel Santisteban
1974
Stage 19a Vuelta a España, Manuel Antonio García
1975
Overall Vuelta a Cantabria, Andrés Gandarias
Stage 19b (ITT) Vuelta a España, Jesús Manzaneque
Tour of the Basque Country

Stage 2b, Andrés Gandarias
Stage 5a, Ventura Díaz
Stage 5b (ITT), Jesús Manzaneque

Stage 3 Vuelta Ciclista a La Rioja, Jesús Manzaneque
Prologue Volta a la Comunitat Valenciana, Jesús Manzaneque
