= Super Ser (cycling team) =

Team information
- Registered: Spain
- Founded: 1975
- Disbanded: 1976
- Discipline: Road

Team name history
- 1975–1976: Super Ser

Super Ser was a Spanish professional cycling team that existed in 1975 and 1976. It was sponsored by Spanish gas heater manufacturer Super Ser. The team's biggest victory was Agustín Tamames's win of the 1976 Volta a Catalunya. During the 1976 Tour de France the team included Pedro Torres and Luis Ocaña. They also had José Viejo, who won stage 11 by +22:50, the largest margin of victory for a solo breakaway in the post WW2 era, a record that still stands as of 2022.
