= Jean-Jacques Fussien =

French cyclist

Personal information
- Born: 21 January 1952 Verneuil-en-Halatte, France
- Died: 23 August 1978 (aged 26) Orléans, France

Cycling career
- Sport: Cycling

Jean-Jacques Fussien (21 January 1952 – 23 August 1978) was a French cyclist. He competed in the team pursuit event at the 1972 Summer Olympics.
