= Antonio Martos (cyclist) =

Spanish cyclist

Personal information
- Born: 27 November 1946 (age 79)

Cycling career
- Sport: Cycling
- Role: Rider

Antonio Martos (born 27 November 1946) is a Spanish racing cyclist. He rode in the 1971 Tour de France.
