= Pedro Torres =

Spanish cyclist (born 1949)

Personal information
- Full name: Pedro Torres Cruces
- Born: 27 April 1949 (age 77) Humilladero, Spain

Cycling career
- Sport: Cycling
- Current team: Retired
- Discipline: Road
- Role: Rider

Professional teams
- 1971–1974: La Casera–Peña Bahamontes
- 1975–1976: Super Ser
- 1977–1978: Teka
- 1979: Transmallorca–Flavia
- 1980: Kelme–Gios

Major wins
- Grand Tours Tour de France Mountains classification (1973) 1 individual stage (1973) Vuelta a España Mountains classification (1977) 1 individual stage (1977)

Pedro Torres Cruces (born 27 April 1949 in Humilladero) is a Spanish former road bicycle racer. He was a GC contender in Grand Tours.

His first was the 1972 Vuelta. In the following year he placed 5th overall in the Vuelta and won the King of the Mountains competition, as well as a stage in the 1973 Tour de France. Late in the year at the World Championships he finished 6th.

In 1975 he took a top 10 in the Volta a Catalunya and then in the Vuelta he came up just short of winning the King of the Mountains while finishing 14th overall. In the Tour he finished 10th while taking a 4th place at the World Championships. In 1976 he started with another top 10 in the Volta a Catalunya, finished 9th in the 1976 Vuelta a España and just inside the top 20 in the Tour.

He began 1977 with another top 10 in the Volta a Catalunya and had a very strong performance in the 77 Vuelta winning stage 15, winning the King of the Mountains and finishing top 10 overall. He then rode the 1977 Critérium du Dauphiné Libéré and finished top 10 in a race that included Hinault, Merckx, Zoetemelk, Van Impe, Agostinho, Danguillaume and Thévenet. In the Tour he had his worst finish to date coming in just inside the top 20.

In 1978 he started off the year with a podium placing in the Volta a Catalunya. He also skipped the 78 Vuelta in favor of riding Paris–Nice and the Giro d'Italia for the first time. In the Giro he took two top 5 stage finishes en route to a top 20 finish. In 1979 he had another top 5 in the Volta a Catalunya, rode the Tour de Suisse for the first time and returned to the Vuelta where he finished 6th.

The 1980 Vuelta a España was the final Vuelta of his career as well as his strongest performance. He finished on the stage podium in each of the ITT's and finished in 2nd place overall. The 1980 Tour de France was his 15th and final grand tour. Nearly his entire team abandoned the race with only Jorge Fortia and Vicente Belda finishing with him.

== Major results ==
1971
7th Overall Vuelta a Andalucía
1972
3rd Clásica de Sabiñánigo
7th Overall Volta a Catalunya
8th Overall Volta a Portugal
1973
Tour de France

1st Mountains classification
1st Stage 14

3rd Overall Vuelta a Asturias
5th Overall Vuelta a España
5th Road race, National Road Championships
6th Road race, UCI World Road Championships
1974
1st Subida a Arrate
3rd Overall Volta a la Comunitat Valenciana
7th Overall Tour of the Basque Country
7th Overall Setmana Catalana de Ciclisme
10th Overall Tour de France
1975
3rd Overall Vuelta a Aragón
3rd Overall Vuelta a Cantabria
4th Overall Grand Prix du Midi Libre
4th Road race, UCI World Road Championships
5th Trofeo Masferrer
6th Klasika Primavera
7th Overall Tour of the Basque Country
8th Overall Volta a Catalunya
10th Overall Volta a la Comunitat Valenciana
1976
3rd Overall Vuelta a Cantabria
6th Overall Volta a Catalunya
7th Overall Tour of the Basque Country
7th Overall Grand Prix du Midi Libre
9th Overall Vuelta a España
9th Road race, National Road Championships
10th Overall Setmana Catalana de Ciclisme
1977
1st Stage 1 (ITT) Escalada a Montjuïc
Vuelta a España

1st Mountains classification
1st Stage 15

3rd Overall Vuelta a Cantabria
4th Trofeo Masferrer
6th Overall Volta a la Comunitat Valenciana
6th GP Villafranca de Ordizia
8th Clásica de Sabiñánigo
9th Overall Setmana Catalana de Ciclisme
9th Road race, National Road Championships
10th Overall Critérium du Dauphiné Libéré
10th Overall Volta a Catalunya
1978
2nd Overall Vuelta a Cantabria
3rd Overall Volta a Catalunya
3rd Trofeo Masferrer
5th Road race, National Road Championships
7th Overall Setmana Catalana de Ciclisme
1979
2nd Overall Vuelta a Cantabria
4th Overall Volta a Catalunya
6th Overall Vuelta a España
9th Overall Vuelta a Andalucía
1980
2nd Overall Vuelta a España
2nd Overall Vuelta a Cantabria

1st Stage 5b

5th Road race, National Road Championships

=== Grand Tour general classification results timeline ===
Grand Tour	1972	1973	1974	1975	1976	1977	1978	1979	1980
Vuelta a España	31	5	DNF	14	5	5	—	6	2
Giro d'Italia	—	—	—	—	—	—	16	—	—
Tour de France	—	13	—	10	17	19	DNF	—	35
