= Miko–de Gribaldy =

Team information
- Registered: Belgium
- Founded: 1974
- Disbanded: 1976
- Discipline: Road

Key personnel
- General manager: Jean de Gribaldy

Team name history
- 1974 1 January – 31 May 1975 1 June – 31 December 1975 1976: MIC–Ludo–de Gribaldy; Alsaver–Jeunet–de Gribaldy; Miko–de Gribaldy; Miko–de Gribaldy–Superia
Miko–de Gribaldy jersey
Jersey

Miko–de Gribaldy was a Belgian professional cycling team that existed from 1974 to 1976. The directeur sportif was former professional rider Jean de Gribaldy, who gave his name to the team. For the final year and a half of its history, its main sponsor was French ice cream manufacturer Miko, whose part-owner, Louis Ortiz, was a friend of de Gribaldy. Its most notable victory was the 1974 Liège–Bastogne–Liège with Georges Pintens.
