= List of teams and cyclists in the 1976 Tour de France =

List of cyclists

In the 1976 Tour de France, the following 13 teams each sent 10 cyclists, for a total of 130:

- Peugeot–Esso
- Gitane–Campagnolo
- Gan–Mercier
- Kas–Campagnolo
- Super Ser
- TI–Raleigh
- Jobo–Wolber–La France
- Velda–Flandria
- Miko–Superia
- Jolly Ceramica
- Lejeune–BP
- Brooklyn
- Scic–Fiat

Eddy Merckx, who already had won the Tour de France five times, had troubles to find his form in 1976, and suffered from saddle sores. He decided not to enter the 1976 Tour de France. The main favourite for the victory was now Joop Zoetemelk, who had never finished worse than fifth place in the Tour de France. The winner of the previous Tour, Bernard Thévenet, had a good spring season, winning the Dauphiné Libéré. The other former winner that was still racing, Luis Ocaña, had become second in the 1976 Vuelta a España, and was hoping to win again Also reigning world champion Hennie Kuiper was considered a pre-race favourite.

== Start list ==
=== By team ===
Peugeot–Esso
No.	Rider	Pos.
1	Bernard Thévenet (FRA)	DNF
2	Patrick Béon (FRA)	61
3	Bernard Bourreau (FRA)	30
4	Jean-Pierre Danguillaume (FRA)	22
5	Raymond Delisle (FRA)	4
6	Jacques Esclassan (FRA)	80
7	Jean-Luc Molinéris (FRA)	DNF
8	Régis Ovion (FRA)	28
9	Charles Rouxel (FRA)	58
10	Guy Sibille (FRA)	47

Gitane–Campagnolo
No.	Rider	Pos.
11	Lucien Van Impe (BEL)	1
12	Hubert Arbès (FRA)	53
13	André Chalmel (FRA)	65
14	Jean Chassang (FRA)	DNF
15	René Dillen (BEL)	74
16	Raymond Martin (FRA)	15
17	Alain Meslet (FRA)	24
18	Robert Mintkiewicz (FRA)	49
19	Willy Teirlinck (BEL)	67
20	Sylvain Vasseur (FRA)	60

Gan–Mercier
No.	Rider	Pos.
21	Raymond Poulidor (FRA)	3
22	Régis Delépine (FRA)	73
23	Jean-Pierre Genet (FRA)	43
24	Yves Hézard (FRA)	45
25	Maurice Le Guilloux (FRA)	48
26	Michel Périn (FRA)	40
27	Christian Seznec (FRA)	29
28	Georges Talbourdet (FRA)	21
29	Gerard Vianen (NED)	76
30	Joop Zoetemelk (NED)	2

Kas–Campagnolo
No.	Rider	Pos.
31	Francisco Galdós (ESP)	6
32	Eulalio García Pereda (ESP)	DNF
33	Vicente López Carril (ESP)	10
34	Enrique Martínez Heredia (ESP)	23
35	José Martins (POR)	12
36	Antonio Martos (ESP)	25
37	Carlos Melero (ESP)	52
38	Antonio Menéndez (ESP)	27
39	Domingo Perurena (ESP)	71
40	José Pesarrodona (ESP)	11

Super Ser
No.	Rider	Pos.
41	Luis Ocaña (ESP)	14
42	Roland Berland (FRA)	72
43	José Casas (ESP)	DNF
44	Josef Fuchs (SUI)	DNF
45	Anastasio Greciano (ESP)	DNF
46	Santiago Lazcano (ESP)	68
47	Jesús Manzaneque (ESP)	DNF
48	Pedro Torres (ESP)	17
49	José Luis Uribezubia (ESP)	86
50	José Viejo (ESP)	31

TI–Raleigh
No.	Rider	Pos.
51	Hennie Kuiper (NED)	DNF
52	José De Cauwer (BEL)	79
53	Co Hoogedoorn (NED)	DNF
54	Gerben Karstens (NED)	84
55	Gerrie Knetemann (NED)	DNF
56	Bert Pronk (NED)	26
57	Jan Raas (NED)	83
58	Aad van den Hoek (NED)	87
59	Jan van Katwijk (NED)	DNF
60	Piet van Katwijk (NED)	DNF

Jobo–Wolber–La France
No.	Rider	Pos.
61	André Romero (FRA)	39
62	Jacques Boulas (FRA)	DNF
63	Robert Bouloux (FRA)	20
64	Alain Cigana (FRA)	DNF
65	André Corbeau (FRA)	DNF
66	Guy Dolhats (FRA)	DNF
67	Henri Fin (FRA)	DNF
68	Bernard Labourdette (FRA)	41
69	Claude Magni (FRA)	DNF
70	Guy Maingon (FRA)	75

Velda–Flandria
No.	Rider	Pos.
71	Freddy Maertens (BEL)	8
72	Herman Beysens (BEL)	62
73	Marc Demeyer (BEL)	56
74	Eric Loder (SUI)	DNF
75	Michel Pollentier (BEL)	7
76	Iwan Schmid (SUI)	51
77	Tino Tabak (NED)	DNF
78	Herman Van Springel (BEL)	DNF
79	Albert Van Vlierberghe (BEL)	57
80	Frans Verhaegen (BEL)	DNF

Miko–Superia
No.	Rider	Pos.
81	Michel Laurent (FRA)	DNF
82	Jean-Pierre Baert (BEL)	DNF
83	Maurizio Bellet (ITA)	DNF
84	Thierry Bolle (SUI)	DNF
85	Michel Charlier (FRA)	DNF
86	Antoine Gutierrez (FRA)	DNF
87	Roger Loysch (BEL)	82
88	Hubert Mathis (FRA)	33
89	Patrick Perret (FRA)	DNF
90	Paul Wellens (BEL)	69

Jolly Ceramica
No.	Rider	Pos.
91	Fausto Bertoglio (ITA)	9
92	Alessio Antonini (ITA)	59
93	Giovanni Battaglin (ITA)	DNF
94	Marcello Bergamo (ITA)	38
95	Alfredo Chinetti (ITA)	DNF
96	Simone Fraccaro (ITA)	DNF
97	Piero Gavazzi (ITA)	63
98	Donato Giuliani (ITA)	32
99	Knut Knudsen (NOR)	64
100	Enrico Maggioni (ITA)	DNF

Lejeune–BP
No.	Rider	Pos.
101	Mariano Martínez (FRA)	42
102	Ferdinand Bracke (BEL)	77
103	Joël Hauvieux (FRA)	70
104	Ferdinand Julien (FRA)	19
105	Éric Lalouette (FRA)	85
106	Michel Le Denmat (FRA)	46
107	Roger Legeay (FRA)	35
108	Eugène Plet (FRA)	DNF
109	Roy Schuiten (NED)	DNF
110	Roland Smet (FRA)	81

Brooklyn
No.	Rider	Pos.
111	Ronald De Witte (BEL)	18
112	Giancarlo Bellini (ITA)	16
113	Luciano Borgognoni (ITA)	DNF
114	Willy De Geest (BEL)	DNF
115	Ercole Gualazzini (ITA)	DNF
116	Valerio Lualdi (ITA)	DNF
117	Marcello Osler (ITA)	66
118	Aldo Parecchini (ITA)	DNF
119	Adriano Passuello (ITA)	78
120	Herman Van der Slagmolen (BEL)	54

Scic–Fiat
No.	Rider	Pos.
121	Gianbattista Baronchelli (ITA)	DNF
122	Arnaldo Caverzasi (ITA)	44
123	Luciano Conati (ITA)	37
124	José Grande Sánchez (ESP)	DNF
125	Miguel María Lasa (ESP)	34
126	Wladimiro Panizza (ITA)	13
127	Enrico Paolini (ITA)	50
128	Walter Riccomi (ITA)	5
129	Attilio Rota (ITA)	36
130	Celestino Vercelli (ITA)	55

=== By rider ===
Legend
No.	Starting number worn by the rider during the Tour
Pos.	Position in the general classification
DNF	Denotes a rider who did not finish

No.	Name	Nationality	Team	Pos.	Ref
1	Bernard Thévenet	France	Peugeot–Esso	DNF	
2	Patrick Béon	France	Peugeot–Esso	61	
3	Bernard Bourreau	France	Peugeot–Esso	30	
4	Jean-Pierre Danguillaume	France	Peugeot–Esso	22	
5	Raymond Delisle	France	Peugeot–Esso	4	
6	Jacques Esclassan	France	Peugeot–Esso	80	
7	Jean-Luc Molinéris	France	Peugeot–Esso	DNF	
8	Régis Ovion	France	Peugeot–Esso	28	
9	Charles Rouxel	France	Peugeot–Esso	58	
10	Guy Sibille	France	Peugeot–Esso	47	
11	Lucien Van Impe	Belgium	Gitane–Campagnolo	1	
12	Hubert Arbès	France	Gitane–Campagnolo	53	
13	André Chalmel	France	Gitane–Campagnolo	65	
14	Jean Chassang	France	Gitane–Campagnolo	DNF	
15	René Dillen	Belgium	Gitane–Campagnolo	74	
16	Raymond Martin	France	Gitane–Campagnolo	15	
17	Alain Meslet	France	Gitane–Campagnolo	24	
18	Robert Mintkiewicz	France	Gitane–Campagnolo	49	
19	Willy Teirlinck	Belgium	Gitane–Campagnolo	67	
20	Sylvain Vasseur	France	Gitane–Campagnolo	60	
21	Raymond Poulidor	France	Gan–Mercier	3	
22	Régis Delépine	France	Gan–Mercier	73	
23	Jean-Pierre Genet	France	Gan–Mercier	43	
24	Yves Hézard	France	Gan–Mercier	45	
25	Maurice Le Guilloux	France	Gan–Mercier	48	
26	Michel Périn	France	Gan–Mercier	40	
27	Christian Seznec	France	Gan–Mercier	29	
28	Georges Talbourdet	France	Gan–Mercier	21	
29	Gerard Vianen	Netherlands	Gan–Mercier	76	
30	Joop Zoetemelk	Netherlands	Gan–Mercier	2	
31	Francisco Galdós	Spain	Kas–Campagnolo	6	
32	Eulalio García Pereda	Spain	Kas–Campagnolo	DNF	
33	Vicente López Carril	Spain	Kas–Campagnolo	10	
34	Enrique Martínez Heredia	Spain	Kas–Campagnolo	23	
35	José Martins	Portugal	Kas–Campagnolo	12	
36	Antonio Martos	Spain	Kas–Campagnolo	25	
37	Carlos Melero	Spain	Kas–Campagnolo	52	
38	Antonio Menéndez	Spain	Kas–Campagnolo	27	
39	Domingo Perurena	Spain	Kas–Campagnolo	71	
40	José Pesarrodona	Spain	Kas–Campagnolo	11	
41	Luis Ocaña	Spain	Super Ser	14	
42	Roland Berland	France	Super Ser	72	
43	José Casas	Spain	Super Ser	DNF	
44	Josef Fuchs	Switzerland	Super Ser	DNF	
45	Anastasio Greciano	Spain	Super Ser	DNF	
46	Santiago Lazcano	Spain	Super Ser	68	
47	Jesús Manzaneque	Spain	Super Ser	DNF	
48	Pedro Torres	Spain	Super Ser	17	
49	José Luis Uribezubia	Spain	Super Ser	86	
50	José Viejo	Spain	Super Ser	31	
51	Hennie Kuiper	Netherlands	TI–Raleigh	DNF	
52	José De Cauwer	Belgium	TI–Raleigh	79	
53	Co Hoogedoorn	Netherlands	TI–Raleigh	DNF	
54	Gerben Karstens	Netherlands	TI–Raleigh	84	
55	Gerrie Knetemann	Netherlands	TI–Raleigh	DNF	
56	Bert Pronk	Netherlands	TI–Raleigh	26	
57	Jan Raas	Netherlands	TI–Raleigh	83	
58	Aad van den Hoek	Netherlands	TI–Raleigh	87	
59	Jan van Katwijk	Netherlands	TI–Raleigh	DNF	
60	Piet van Katwijk	Netherlands	TI–Raleigh	DNF	
61	André Romero	France	Jobo–Wolber–La France	39	
62	Jacques Boulas	France	Jobo–Wolber–La France	DNF	
63	Robert Bouloux	France	Jobo–Wolber–La France	20	
64	Alain Cigana	France	Jobo–Wolber–La France	DNF	
65	André Corbeau	France	Jobo–Wolber–La France	DNF	
66	Guy Dolhats	France	Jobo–Wolber–La France	DNF	
67	Henri Fin	France	Jobo–Wolber–La France	DNF	
68	Bernard Labourdette	France	Jobo–Wolber–La France	41	
69	Claude Magni	France	Jobo–Wolber–La France	DNF	
70	Guy Maingon	France	Jobo–Wolber–La France	75	
71	Freddy Maertens	Belgium	Velda–Flandria	8	
72	Herman Beysens	Belgium	Velda–Flandria	62	
73	Marc Demeyer	Belgium	Velda–Flandria	56	
74	Eric Loder	Switzerland	Velda–Flandria	DNF	
75	Michel Pollentier	Belgium	Velda–Flandria	7	
76	Iwan Schmid	Switzerland	Velda–Flandria	51	
77	Tino Tabak	Netherlands	Velda–Flandria	DNF	
78	Herman Van Springel	Belgium	Velda–Flandria	DNF	
79	Albert Van Vlierberghe	Belgium	Velda–Flandria	57	
80	Frans Verhaegen	Belgium	Velda–Flandria	DNF	
81	Michel Laurent	France	Miko–Superia	DNF	
82	Jean-Pierre Baert	Belgium	Miko–Superia	DNF	
83	Maurizio Bellet	Italy	Miko–Superia	DNF	
84	Thierry Bolle	Switzerland	Miko–Superia	DNF	
85	Michel Charlier	France	Miko–Superia	DNF	
86	Antoine Gutierrez	France	Miko–Superia	DNF	
87	Roger Loysch	Belgium	Miko–Superia	82	
88	Hubert Mathis	France	Miko–Superia	33	
89	Patrick Perret	France	Miko–Superia	DNF	
90	Paul Wellens	Belgium	Miko–Superia	69	
91	Fausto Bertoglio	Italy	Jolly Ceramica	9	
92	Alessio Antonini	Italy	Jolly Ceramica	59	
93	Giovanni Battaglin	Italy	Jolly Ceramica	DNF	
94	Marco Bergamo	Italy	Jolly Ceramica	38	
95	Alfredo Chinetti	Italy	Jolly Ceramica	DNF	
96	Simone Fraccaro	Italy	Jolly Ceramica	DNF	
97	Piero Gavazzi	Italy	Jolly Ceramica	63	
98	Donato Giuliani	Italy	Jolly Ceramica	32	
99	Knut Knudsen	Norway	Jolly Ceramica	64	
100	Enrico Maggioni	Italy	Jolly Ceramica	DNF	
101	Mariano Martínez	France	Lejeune–BP	42	
102	Ferdinand Bracke	Belgium	Lejeune–BP	77	
103	Joël Hauvieux	France	Lejeune–BP	70	
104	Ferdinand Julien	France	Lejeune–BP	19	
105	Éric Lalouette	France	Lejeune–BP	85	
106	Michel Le Denmat	France	Lejeune–BP	46	
107	Roger Legeay	France	Lejeune–BP	35	
108	Eugène Plet	France	Lejeune–BP	DNF	
109	Roy Schuiten	Netherlands	Lejeune–BP	DNF	
110	Roland Smet	France	Lejeune–BP	81	
111	Ronald De Witte	Belgium	Brooklyn	18	
112	Giancarlo Bellini	Italy	Brooklyn	16	
113	Luciano Borgognoni	Italy	Brooklyn	DNF	
114	Willy De Geest	Belgium	Brooklyn	DNF	
115	Ercole Gualazzini	Italy	Brooklyn	DNF	
116	Valerio Lualdi	Italy	Brooklyn	DNF	
117	Marcello Osler	Italy	Brooklyn	66	
118	Aldo Parecchini	Italy	Brooklyn	DNF	
119	Adriano Passuello	Italy	Brooklyn	78	
120	Herman Van der Slagmolen	Belgium	Brooklyn	54	
121	Gianbattista Baronchelli	Italy	Scic–Fiat	DNF	
122	Arnaldo Caverzasi	Italy	Scic–Fiat	44	
123	Luciano Conati	Italy	Scic–Fiat	37	
124	José Grande Sánchez	Spain	Scic–Fiat	DNF	
125	Miguel María Lasa	Spain	Scic–Fiat	34	
126	Wladimiro Panizza	Italy	Scic–Fiat	13	
127	Enrico Paolini	Italy	Scic–Fiat	50	
128	Walter Riccomi	Italy	Scic–Fiat	5	
129	Attilio Rota	Italy	Scic–Fiat	36	
130	Celestino Vercelli	Italy	Scic–Fiat	55	
