= 1976 Vuelta a España, Prologue to Stage 10 =

Cycling race stages

The 1976 Vuelta a España was the 31st edition of the Vuelta a España, one of cycling's Grand Tours. The Vuelta began in Estepona, with a prologue individual time trial on 27 April, and Stage 10 occurred on 7 May with a stage to Cambrils. The race finished in San Sebastián on 17 May.

== Prologue ==
27 April 1976 - Estepona to Estepona, 3.2 km (2.0 mi) (ITT)

Prologue result and general classification after Prologue

| Rank | Rider | Team | Time |
|---|---|---|---|
| 1 | Dietrich Thurau (FRG) | TI–Raleigh–Campagnolo | 4' 03" |
| 2 | Francisco Elorriaga (ESP) | Super Ser | + 2" |
| 3 | Co Hoogedoorn (NED) | TI–Raleigh–Campagnolo | + 7" |
| 4 | Hennie Kuiper (NED) | TI–Raleigh–Campagnolo | s.t. |
| 5 | Jesús Manzaneque (ESP) | Super Ser | s.t. |
| 6 | Gerrie Knetemann (NED) | TI–Raleigh–Campagnolo | + 8" |
| 7 | José Antonio González (ESP) | Kas–Campagnolo | s.t. |
| 8 | Jean-Luc Yansenne (BEL) | Miko–de Gribaldy–Superia | + 10" |
| 9 | Hugo Van Gastel (BEL) | Ebo–Cinzia | s.t. |
| 10 | José De Cauwer (BEL) | TI–Raleigh–Campagnolo | + 11" |

== Stage 1 ==
28 April 1976 - Estepona to Estepona, 135 km (83.9 mi)

Stage 1 result

| Rank | Rider | Team | Time |
|---|---|---|---|
| 1 | José De Cauwer (BEL) | TI–Raleigh–Campagnolo | 3h 28' 48" |
| 2 | Georges Pintens (BEL) | Miko–de Gribaldy–Superia | + 6" |
| 3 | Cees Priem (NED) | Frisol–Gazelle | + 10" |
| 4 | Eric Jacques (BEL) | Ebo–Cinzia | s.t. |
| 5 | Jan Aling (NED) | Ebo–Cinzia | s.t. |
| 6 | Vicente López Carril (ESP) | Kas–Campagnolo | s.t. |
| 7 | Santiago Lazcano (ESP) | Super Ser | s.t. |
| 8 | Co Hoogedoorn (NED) | TI–Raleigh–Campagnolo | s.t. |
| 9 | Paul Lannoo (BEL) | Frisol–Gazelle | s.t. |
| 10 | Wilfried Reybrouck (BEL) | Ebo–Cinzia | + 16" |

General classification after Stage 1

| Rank | Rider | Team | Time |
|---|---|---|---|
| 1 | José De Cauwer (BEL) | TI–Raleigh–Campagnolo | 3h 33' 02" |
| 2 | Francisco Elorriaga (ESP) | Super Ser | + 4" |
| 3 | Dietrich Thurau (FRG) | TI–Raleigh–Campagnolo | + 5" |
| 4 | Co Hoogedoorn (NED) | TI–Raleigh–Campagnolo | + 6" |
| 5 | Georges Pintens (BEL) | Miko–de Gribaldy–Superia | + 11" |
| 6 | Cees Priem (NED) | Frisol–Gazelle | + 12" |
| 7 | Hennie Kuiper (NED) | TI–Raleigh–Campagnolo | s.t. |
| 8 | Jesús Manzaneque (ESP) | Super Ser | s.t. |
| 9 | Gerrie Knetemann (NED) | TI–Raleigh–Campagnolo | + 13" |
| 10 | José Antonio González (ESP) | Kas–Campagnolo | s.t. |

== Stage 2 ==
29 April 1976 - Estepona to Priego de Córdoba, 224 km (139.2 mi)

Stage 2 result

| Rank | Rider | Team | Time |
|---|---|---|---|
| 1 | Roger Gilson (LUX) | Frisol–Gazelle | 6h 29' 15" |
| 2 | Domingo Perurena (ESP) | Kas–Campagnolo | + 7" |
| 3 | Dietrich Thurau (FRG) | TI–Raleigh–Campagnolo | + 11" |
| 4 | José De Cauwer (BEL) | TI–Raleigh–Campagnolo | s.t. |
| 5 | Daniel Verplancke (BEL) | Flandria–Velda–West Vlaams Vleesbedrijf | s.t. |
| 6 | Cees Priem (NED) | Frisol–Gazelle | s.t. |
| 7 | Carlos Cuyle (BEL) | Flandria–Velda–West Vlaams Vleesbedrijf | s.t. |
| 8 | Hennie Kuiper (NED) | TI–Raleigh–Campagnolo | s.t. |
| 9 | Herman Van Springel (BEL) | Flandria–Velda–West Vlaams Vleesbedrijf | s.t. |
| 10 | Raphaël Constant (BEL) | Zoppas–Splendor–Sinalco | s.t. |

General classification after Stage 2

| Rank | Rider | Team | Time |
|---|---|---|---|
| 1 | José De Cauwer (BEL) | TI–Raleigh–Campagnolo | 10h 02' 28" |
| 2 | Francisco Elorriaga (ESP) | Super Ser | + 4" |
| 3 | Dietrich Thurau (FRG) | TI–Raleigh–Campagnolo | + 5" |
| 4 | Co Hoogedoorn (NED) | TI–Raleigh–Campagnolo | + 6" |
| 5 | Georges Pintens (BEL) | Miko–de Gribaldy–Superia | + 11" |
| 6 | Cees Priem (NED) | Frisol–Gazelle | + 12" |
| 7 | Hennie Kuiper (NED) | TI–Raleigh–Campagnolo | s.t. |
| 8 | Jesús Manzaneque (ESP) | Super Ser | s.t. |
| 9 | Domingo Perurena (ESP) | Kas–Campagnolo | + 13" |
| 10 | Gerrie Knetemann (NED) | TI–Raleigh–Campagnolo | s.t. |

== Stage 3 ==
30 April 1976 - Priego de Córdoba to Jaén, 177 km (110 mi)

Stage 3 result

| Rank | Rider | Team | Time |
|---|---|---|---|
| 1 | Theo Smit (NED) | Frisol–Gazelle | 5h 09' 17" |
| 2 | Tomás Nistal (ESP) | Kas–Campagnolo | + 5" |
| 3 | Wilfried Reybrouck (BEL) | Ebo–Cinzia | + 10" |
| 4 | Francisco Elorriaga (ESP) | Super Ser | s.t. |
| 5 | Carlos Cuyle (BEL) | Flandria–Velda–West Vlaams Vleesbedrijf | s.t. |
| 6 | Domingo Perurena (ESP) | Kas–Campagnolo | s.t. |
| 7 | Herman Van Springel (BEL) | Flandria–Velda–West Vlaams Vleesbedrijf | s.t. |
| 8 | Georges Pintens (BEL) | Miko–de Gribaldy–Superia | s.t. |
| 9 | José De Cauwer (BEL) | TI–Raleigh–Campagnolo | s.t. |
| 10 | Paul Wellens (BEL) | Miko–de Gribaldy–Superia | s.t. |

General classification after Stage 3

| Rank | Rider | Team | Time |
|---|---|---|---|
| 1 | José De Cauwer (BEL) | TI–Raleigh–Campagnolo | 15h 11' 55" |
| 2 | Dietrich Thurau (FRG) | TI–Raleigh–Campagnolo | + 2" |
| 3 | Francisco Elorriaga (ESP) | Super Ser | + 4" |
| 4 | Co Hoogedoorn (NED) | TI–Raleigh–Campagnolo | + 6" |
| 5 | Theo Smit (NED) | Frisol–Gazelle | + 9" |
| 6 | Domingo Perurena (ESP) | Kas–Campagnolo | + 10" |
| 7 | Georges Pintens (BEL) | Miko–de Gribaldy–Superia | + 11" |
| 8 | Hennie Kuiper (NED) | TI–Raleigh–Campagnolo | + 12" |
| 9 | Cees Priem (NED) | Frisol–Gazelle | s.t. |
| 10 | Jesús Manzaneque (ESP) | Super Ser | s.t. |

== Stage 4 ==
1 May 1976 - Jaén to Baza, 166 km (103 mi)

Stage 4 result

| Rank | Rider | Team | Time |
|---|---|---|---|
| ~~1~~ | ~~Gunther Haritz (FRG)~~ | ~~TI–Raleigh–Campagnolo~~ | 4h 58' 09" (Note: Haritz declassified.) |
| 1 | Hennie Kuiper (NED) | TI–Raleigh–Campagnolo | 4h 59' 36" @ 27" |
| 2 | Francisco Elorriaga (ESP) | Super Ser | + 31" |
| 4 | Daniel Verplancke (BEL) | Flandria–Velda–West Vlaams Vleesbedrijf | + 34" |
| 5 | Ferdi Van Den Haute (BEL) | Ebo–Cinzia | s.t. |
| 6 | Gerrie Knetemann (NED) | TI–Raleigh–Campagnolo | s.t. |
| 7 | Enrique Cima (ESP) | Novostil–Transmallorca | s.t. |
| 8 | Cees Priem (NED) | Frisol–Gazelle | s.t. |
| 9 | José De Cauwer (BEL) | TI–Raleigh–Campagnolo | 4h 59' 47" |
| 10 | Eric Jacques (BEL) | Ebo–Cinzia | s.t. |

General classification after Stage 4

| Rank | Rider | Team | Time |
|---|---|---|---|
| 1 | ~~Gunther Haritz (FRG)~~ | ~~TI–Raleigh–Campagnolo~~ | 20h 10' 26" |
| 2 | Francisco Elorriaga (ESP) | Super Ser | + 1' 11" |
| 3 | José De Cauwer (BEL) | TI–Raleigh–Campagnolo | + 1' 14" |
| 4 | Hennie Kuiper (NED) | TI–Raleigh–Campagnolo | + 1' 15" |
| 5 | Dietrich Thurau (FRG) | TI–Raleigh–Campagnolo | + 1' 20" |
| 6 | Co Hoogedoorn (NED) | TI–Raleigh–Campagnolo | s.t. |
| 7 | Domingo Perurena (ESP) | Kas–Campagnolo | + 1' 21" |
| 8 | Cees Priem (NED) | Frisol–Gazelle | + 1' 22" |
| 9 | Gerrie Knetemann (NED) | TI–Raleigh–Campagnolo | + 1' 23" |
| 10 | Jesús Manzaneque (ESP) | Super Ser | + 1' 26" |

== Stage 5 ==
2 May 1976 - Baza to Cartagena, 201 km (125 mi)

Stage 5 result

| Rank | Rider | Team | Time |
|---|---|---|---|
| 1 | Theo Smit (NED) | Frisol–Gazelle | 5h 53' 21" |
| 2 | Francisco Elorriaga (ESP) | Super Ser | + 6" |
| 3 | Johnny Vanderveken (NED) | Ebo–Cinzia | + 10" |
| 4 | Enrique Martínez Heredia (ESP) | Kas–Campagnolo | s.t. |
| 5 | Gerben Karstens (NED) | TI–Raleigh–Campagnolo | s.t. |
| 6 | Dietrich Thurau (FRG) | TI–Raleigh–Campagnolo | s.t. |
| 7 | José De Cauwer (BEL) | TI–Raleigh–Campagnolo | s.t. |
| 8 | Cees Priem (NED) | Frisol–Gazelle | s.t. |
| 9 | Roger Rosiers (BEL) | Super Ser | s.t. |
| 10 | Gunther Haritz (FRG) | TI–Raleigh–Campagnolo | s.t. |

General classification after Stage 5

| Rank | Rider | Team | Time |
|---|---|---|---|
| 1 | Gunther Haritz (FRG) | TI–Raleigh–Campagnolo | 26h 03' 59" |
| 2 | Francisco Elorriaga (ESP) | Super Ser | + 1' 07" |
| 3 | José De Cauwer (BEL) | TI–Raleigh–Campagnolo | + 1' 14" |
| 4 | Hennie Kuiper (NED) | TI–Raleigh–Campagnolo | + 1' 15" |
| 5 | Dietrich Thurau (FRG) | TI–Raleigh–Campagnolo | + 1' 16" |
| 6 | Co Hoogedoorn (NED) | TI–Raleigh–Campagnolo | + 1' 20" |
| 7 | Domingo Perurena (ESP) | Kas–Campagnolo | + 1' 21" |
| 8 | Cees Priem (NED) | Frisol–Gazelle | + 1' 22" |
| 9 | Gerrie Knetemann (NED) | TI–Raleigh–Campagnolo | + 1' 23" |
| 10 | Jesús Manzaneque (ESP) | Super Ser | + 1' 26" |

== Stage 6 ==
3 May 1976 - Cartagena to Cartagena, 14 km (8.7 mi) (ITT)

Stage 6 result

| Rank | Rider | Team | Time |
|---|---|---|---|
| 1 | Joaquim Agostinho (POR) | Teka | 19' 08" |
| 2 | Jesús Manzaneque (ESP) | Super Ser | + 10" |
| 3 | Josef Fuchs (SUI) | Super Ser | + 13" |
| 4 | Dietrich Thurau (FRG) | TI–Raleigh–Campagnolo | + 16" |
| 5 | Hennie Kuiper (NED) | TI–Raleigh–Campagnolo | + 18" |
| 6 | Luis Ocaña (ESP) | Super Ser | + 20" |
| 7 | Gerrie Knetemann (NED) | TI–Raleigh–Campagnolo | + 22" |
| 8 | José Pesarrodona (ESP) | Kas–Campagnolo | + 25" |
| 9 | Hubert Pronk (NED) | TI–Raleigh–Campagnolo | + 26" |
| 10 | Agustín Tamames (ESP) | Super Ser | + 28" |

== Stage 7 ==
4 May 1976 - Cartagena to Murcia, 136 km (85 mi)

Stage 7 result

| Rank | Rider | Team | Time |
|---|---|---|---|
| 1 | Ferdi Van Den Haute (BEL) | Ebo–Cinzia | 3h 02' 06" |
| 2 | Francisco Elorriaga (ESP) | Super Ser | + 8" |
| 3 | Cees Priem (NED) | Frisol–Gazelle | + 22" |
| 4 | Hennie Kuiper (NED) | TI–Raleigh–Campagnolo | s.t. |
| 5 | José De Cauwer (BEL) | TI–Raleigh–Campagnolo | s.t. |
| 6 | Herman Van Springel (BEL) | Flandria–Velda–West Vlaams Vleesbedrijf | s.t. |
| 7 | Jean-Pierre Baert (BEL) | Miko–de Gribaldy–Superia | s.t. |
| 8 | Gerrie Knetemann (NED) | TI–Raleigh–Campagnolo | s.t. |
| 9 | Willy Van Neste (BEL) | Frisol–Gazelle | s.t. |
| 10 | Dietrich Thurau (FRG) | TI–Raleigh–Campagnolo | s.t. |

General classification after Stage 7

| Rank | Rider | Team | Time |
|---|---|---|---|
| 1 | Joaquim Agostinho (POR) | Teka | 29h 44' 45" |
| 2 | Dietrich Thurau (FRG) | TI–Raleigh–Campagnolo | + 12" |
| 3 | Jesús Manzaneque (ESP) | Super Ser | s.t. |
| 4 | Hennie Kuiper (NED) | TI–Raleigh–Campagnolo | + 13" |
| 5 | Gerrie Knetemann (NED) | TI–Raleigh–Campagnolo | + 25" |
| 6 | Francisco Elorriaga (ESP) | Super Ser | + 27" |
| 7 | Josef Fuchs (SUI) | Super Ser | + 28" |
| 8 | Luis Ocaña (ESP) | Super Ser | + 35" |
| 9 | Hubert Pronk (NED) | TI–Raleigh–Campagnolo | + 38" |
| 10 | Agustín Tamames (ESP) | Super Ser | + 39" |

== Stage 8 ==
5 May 1976 - Murcia to Almansa, 219 km (136 mi)

Stage 8 result

| Rank | Rider | Team | Time |
|---|---|---|---|
| 1 | Georges Pintens (BEL) | Miko–de Gribaldy–Superia | 5h 59' 12" |
| 2 | Eric Jacques (BEL) | Ebo–Cinzia | + 16" |
| 3 | Francisco Elorriaga (ESP) | Super Ser | + 9' 22" |
| 4 | Ferdi Van Den Haute (BEL) | Ebo–Cinzia | s.t. |
| 5 | Domingo Perurena (ESP) | Kas–Campagnolo | s.t. |
| 6 | Dietrich Thurau (FRG) | TI–Raleigh–Campagnolo | s.t. |
| 7 | Cees Priem (NED) | Frisol–Gazelle | s.t. |
| 8 | Roger Rosiers (BEL) | Super Ser | s.t. |
| 9 | Carlos Cuyle (BEL) | Flandria–Velda–West Vlaams Vleesbedrijf | s.t. |
| 10 | José De Cauwer (BEL) | TI–Raleigh–Campagnolo | s.t. |

General classification after Stage 8

| Rank | Rider | Team | Time |
|---|---|---|---|
| 1 | Eric Jacques (BEL) | Ebo–Cinzia | 35h 49' 30" |
| 2 | Joaquim Agostinho (POR) | Teka | + 3' 57" |
| 3 | Dietrich Thurau (FRG) | TI–Raleigh–Campagnolo | + 4' 01" |
| 4 | Jesús Manzaneque (ESP) | Super Ser | s.t. |
| 5 | Hennie Kuiper (NED) | TI–Raleigh–Campagnolo | + 4' 02" |
| 6 | Gerrie Knetemann (NED) | TI–Raleigh–Campagnolo | + 4' 14" |
| 7 | Francisco Elorriaga (ESP) | Super Ser | + 4' 16" |
| 8 | Josef Fuchs (SUI) | Super Ser | + 4' 17" |
| 9 | Luis Ocaña (ESP) | Super Ser | + 4' 24" |
| 10 | Hubert Pronk (NED) | TI–Raleigh–Campagnolo | + 4' 27" |

== Stage 9 ==
6 May 1976 - Almansa to Nules, 208 km (129 mi)

Stage 9 result

| Rank | Rider | Team | Time |
|---|---|---|---|
| 1 | Dietrich Thurau (FRG) | TI–Raleigh–Campagnolo | 5h 54' 31" |
| 2 | Domingo Perurena (ESP) | Kas–Campagnolo | + 6" |
| 3 | Dirk Ongenae (BEL) | Flandria–Velda–West Vlaams Vleesbedrijf | + 10" |
| 4 | Gerben Karstens (NED) | TI–Raleigh–Campagnolo | s.t. |
| 5 | Francisco Elorriaga (ESP) | Super Ser | s.t. |
| 6 | Cees Priem (NED) | Frisol–Gazelle | s.t. |
| 7 | Jan van Katwijk (NED) | TI–Raleigh–Campagnolo | s.t. |
| 8 | Herman Van Springel (BEL) | Flandria–Velda–West Vlaams Vleesbedrijf | s.t. |
| 9 | Julien Van Lint (BEL) | Ebo–Cinzia | s.t. |
| 10 | Ferdi Van Den Haute (BEL) | Ebo–Cinzia | s.t. |

General classification after Stage 9

| Rank | Rider | Team | Time |
|---|---|---|---|
| 1 | Eric Jacques (BEL) | Ebo–Cinzia | 41h 33' 11" |
| 2 | Dietrich Thurau (FRG) | TI–Raleigh–Campagnolo | + 3' 48" |
| 3 | Joaquim Agostinho (POR) | Teka | + 3' 53" |
| 4 | Jesús Manzaneque (ESP) | Super Ser | + 4' 01" |
| 5 | Hennie Kuiper (NED) | TI–Raleigh–Campagnolo | + 4' 02" |
| 6 | Gerrie Knetemann (NED) | TI–Raleigh–Campagnolo | + 4' 14" |
| 7 | Francisco Elorriaga (ESP) | Super Ser | + 4' 16" |
| 8 | Josef Fuchs (SUI) | Super Ser | + 4' 17" |
| 9 | Luis Ocaña (ESP) | Super Ser | + 4' 24" |
| 10 | Hubert Pronk (NED) | TI–Raleigh–Campagnolo | + 4' 27" |

== Stage 10 ==
7 May 1976 - Castellón to Cambrils, 226 km (140 mi)

Stage 10 result

| Rank | Rider | Team | Time |
|---|---|---|---|
| 1 | José Antonio González (ESP) | Kas–Campagnolo | 6h 14' 00" |
| 2 | Domingo Perurena (ESP) | Kas–Campagnolo | + 8" |
| 3 | Andrés Oliva (ESP) | Kas–Campagnolo | + 12" |
| 4 | Cees Priem (NED) | Frisol–Gazelle | s.t. |
| 5 | Julián Andiano (ESP) | Teka | s.t. |
| 6 | Dietrich Thurau (FRG) | TI–Raleigh–Campagnolo | s.t. |
| 7 | Hennie Kuiper (NED) | TI–Raleigh–Campagnolo | s.t. |
| 8 | Jean-Pierre Baert (BEL) | Miko–de Gribaldy–Superia | s.t. |
| 9 | Gerrie Knetemann (NED) | TI–Raleigh–Campagnolo | s.t. |
| 10 | Donald Allan (AUS) | Frisol–Gazelle | s.t. |

General classification after Stage 10

| Rank | Rider | Team | Time |
|---|---|---|---|
| 1 | Eric Jacques (BEL) | Ebo–Cinzia | 47h 58' 23" |
| 2 | Dietrich Thurau (FRG) | TI–Raleigh–Campagnolo | + 3' 45" |
| 3 | Joaquim Agostinho (POR) | Teka | + 3' 53" |
| 4 | Jesús Manzaneque (ESP) | Super Ser | + 4' 01" |
| 5 | Hennie Kuiper (NED) | TI–Raleigh–Campagnolo | + 4' 02" |
| 6 | Gerrie Knetemann (NED) | TI–Raleigh–Campagnolo | + 4' 14" |
| 7 | Josef Fuchs (SUI) | Super Ser | + 4' 17" |
| 8 | José Antonio González (ESP) | Kas–Campagnolo | + 4' 22" |
| 9 | Luis Ocaña (ESP) | Super Ser | + 4' 24" |
| 10 | Hubert Pronk (NED) | TI–Raleigh–Campagnolo | + 4' 27" |
