= 1976 Vuelta a España, Stage 11 to Stage 19b =

Cycling race stages

The 1976 Vuelta a España was the 31st edition of the Vuelta a España, one of cycling's Grand Tours. The Vuelta began in Estepona, with a prologue individual time trial on 27 April, and Stage 11 occurred on 8 May with a stage from Cambrils. The race finished in San Sebastián on 17 May.

== Stage 11 ==
8 May 1976 - Cambrils to Barcelona, 151 km (93.8 mi)

Stage 11 result

Rank	Rider	Team	Time
1	Antonio Vallori (ESP)	Novostil–Transmallorca	4h 12' 14"
2	Gerben Karstens (NED)	TI–Raleigh–Campagnolo	+ 4' 47"
3	Enrique Cima (ESP)	Novostil–Transmallorca	+ 4' 55"
4	José Nazabal (ESP)	Kas–Campagnolo	+ 4' 57"
5	Gerrie Knetemann (NED)	TI–Raleigh–Campagnolo	+ 5' 00"
6	Domingo Perurena (ESP)	Kas–Campagnolo	+ 5' 02"
7	Francisco Elorriaga (ESP)	Super Ser	+ 5' 03"
8	Josef Fuchs (SUI)	Super Ser	s.t.
9	Joaquim Agostinho (POR)	Teka	s.t.
10	Eric Jacques (BEL)	Ebo–Cinzia	s.t.

General classification after Stage 11

Rank	Rider	Team	Time
1	Eric Jacques (BEL)	Ebo–Cinzia	52h 15' 40"
2	Dietrich Thurau (FRG)	TI–Raleigh–Campagnolo	+ 3' 45"
3	Joaquim Agostinho (POR)	Teka	+ 3' 53"
4	Jesús Manzaneque (ESP)	Super Ser	+ 4' 01"
5	Hennie Kuiper (NED)	TI–Raleigh–Campagnolo	+ 4' 02"
6	Gerrie Knetemann (NED)	TI–Raleigh–Campagnolo	+ 4' 11"
7	Josef Fuchs (SUI)	Super Ser	+ 4' 17"
8	José Antonio González (ESP)	Kas–Campagnolo	+ 4' 22"
9	Luis Ocaña (ESP)	Super Ser	+ 4' 24"
10	Hubert Pronk (NED)	TI–Raleigh–Campagnolo	+ 4' 27"

== Stage 12 ==
9 May 1976 - Pamplona to Logroño, 168 km (104.4 mi)

Stage 12 result

Rank	Rider	Team	Time
1	Gerben Karstens (NED)	TI–Raleigh–Campagnolo	4h 28' 32"
2	Dirk Ongenae (BEL)	Flandria–Velda–West Vlaams Vleesbedrijf	+ 6"
3	Cees Priem (NED)	Frisol–Gazelle	+ 10"
4	Domingo Perurena (ESP)	Kas–Campagnolo	s.t.
5	Francisco Elorriaga (ESP)	Super Ser	s.t.
6	Daniel Verplancke (BEL)	Flandria–Velda–West Vlaams Vleesbedrijf	s.t.
7	Hennie Kuiper (NED)	TI–Raleigh–Campagnolo	s.t.
8	Eric Jacques (BEL)	Ebo–Cinzia	s.t.
9	Julien Van Lint (BEL)	Ebo–Cinzia	s.t.
10	Arthur Van De Vijver (BEL)	Flandria–Velda–West Vlaams Vleesbedrijf	s.t.

General classification after Stage 12

Rank	Rider	Team	Time
1	Eric Jacques (BEL)	Ebo–Cinzia	56h 44' 22"
2	Dietrich Thurau (FRG)	TI–Raleigh–Campagnolo	+ 3' 45"
3	Joaquim Agostinho (POR)	Teka	+ 3' 53"
4	Jesús Manzaneque (ESP)	Super Ser	+ 4' 01"
5	Hennie Kuiper (NED)	TI–Raleigh–Campagnolo	+ 4' 02"
6	Gerrie Knetemann (NED)	TI–Raleigh–Campagnolo	+ 4' 11"
7	José Antonio González (ESP)	Kas–Campagnolo	+ 4' 22"
8	Luis Ocaña (ESP)	Super Ser	+ 4' 24"
9	Josef Fuchs (SUI)	Super Ser	+ 4' 27"
10	Hubert Pronk (NED)	TI–Raleigh–Campagnolo	s.t.

== Stage 13 ==
10 May 1976 - Logroño to Palencia, 209 km (130 mi)

Stage 13 result

Rank	Rider	Team	Time
1	Dirk Ongenae (BEL)	Flandria–Velda–West Vlaams Vleesbedrijf	5h 25' 05"
2	Juan Manuel Santisteban (ESP)	Kas–Campagnolo	+ 8"
3	Francisco Elorriaga (ESP)	Super Ser	+ 17"
4	Jan van Katwijk (NED)	TI–Raleigh–Campagnolo	s.t.
5	Cees Priem (NED)	Frisol–Gazelle	s.t.
6	Gerben Karstens (NED)	TI–Raleigh–Campagnolo	s.t.
7	Domingo Perurena (ESP)	Kas–Campagnolo	s.t.
8	Eric Jacques (BEL)	Ebo–Cinzia	s.t.
9	Julien Van Lint (BEL)	Ebo–Cinzia	s.t.
10	Ferdi Van Den Haute (BEL)	Ebo–Cinzia	s.t.

== Stage 14 ==
11 May 1976 - Paredes de Nava to Gijón, 249 km (155 mi)

Stage 14 result

Rank	Rider	Team	Time
1	Cees Priem (NED)	Frisol–Gazelle	7h 33' 11"
2	Domingo Perurena (ESP)	Kas–Campagnolo	+ 4"
3	Luis Alberto Ordiales (ESP)	Novostil–Transmallorca	+ 10"
4	Francisco Elorriaga (ESP)	Super Ser	s.t.
5	Gerben Karstens (NED)	TI–Raleigh–Campagnolo	s.t.
6	Julien Van Lint (BEL)	Ebo–Cinzia	s.t.
7	Julián Andiano (ESP)	Teka	s.t.
8	Dietrich Thurau (FRG)	TI–Raleigh–Campagnolo	s.t.
9	Jan van Katwijk (NED)	TI–Raleigh–Campagnolo	s.t.
10	Vicente López Carril (ESP)	Kas–Campagnolo	s.t.

General classification after Stage 14

Rank	Rider	Team	Time
1	Dietrich Thurau (FRG)	TI–Raleigh–Campagnolo	69h 46' 50"
2	Joaquim Agostinho (POR)	Teka	+ 8"
3	Jesús Manzaneque (ESP)	Super Ser	+ 16"
4	Hennie Kuiper (NED)	TI–Raleigh–Campagnolo	+ 17"
5	Gerrie Knetemann (NED)	TI–Raleigh–Campagnolo	+ 23"
6	José Antonio González (ESP)	Kas–Campagnolo	+ 37"
7	Cees Priem (NED)	Frisol–Gazelle	+ 39"
8	Luis Ocaña (ESP)	Super Ser	s.t.
9	Josef Fuchs (SUI)	Super Ser	+ 42"
10	Hubert Pronk (NED)	TI–Raleigh–Campagnolo	+ 43"

== Stage 15 ==
12 May 1976 - Gijón to Cangas de Onís, 141 km (88 mi)

Route:

Stage 15 result

Rank	Rider	Team	Time
1	Vicente López Carril (ESP)	Kas–Campagnolo	3h 52' 22"
2	Ludo Loos (BEL)	Ebo–Cinzia	+ 6"
3	Hennie Kuiper (NED)	TI–Raleigh–Campagnolo	+ 10"
4	Joaquim Agostinho (POR)	Teka	s.t.
5	Andrés Oliva (ESP)	Kas–Campagnolo	s.t.
6	José Nazabal (ESP)	Kas–Campagnolo	s.t.
7	Luis Ocaña (ESP)	Super Ser	s.t.
8	Gonzalo Aja (ESP)	Teka	s.t.
9	José Pesarrodona (ESP)	Kas–Campagnolo	s.t.
10	Ventura Díaz (ESP)	Teka	+ 1' 51"

General classification after Stage 15

Rank	Rider	Team	Time
1	Joaquim Agostinho (POR)	Teka	73h 39' 30"
2	Hennie Kuiper (NED)	TI–Raleigh–Campagnolo	+ 9"
3	Luis Ocaña (ESP)	Super Ser	+ 31"
4	José Pesarrodona (ESP)	Kas–Campagnolo	+ 51"
5	José Nazabal (ESP)	Kas–Campagnolo	+ 1' 01"
6	Gonzalo Aja (ESP)	Teka	+ 1' 06"
7	Ludo Loos (BEL)	Ebo–Cinzia	+ 1' 28"
8	Vicente López Carril (ESP)	Kas–Campagnolo	+ 1' 34"
9	Josef Fuchs (SUI)	Super Ser	+ 2' 42"
10	Dietrich Thurau (FRG)	TI–Raleigh–Campagnolo	+ 3' 04"

== Stage 16 ==
13 May 1976 - Cangas de Onís to Reinosa, 156 km (97 mi)

Route:

Stage 16 result

Rank	Rider	Team	Time
1	Dietrich Thurau (FRG)	TI–Raleigh–Campagnolo	4h 38' 10"
2	José Nazabal (ESP)	Kas–Campagnolo	+ 6"
3	Ludo Loos (BEL)	Ebo–Cinzia	+ 10"
4	Vicente López Carril (ESP)	Kas–Campagnolo	s.t.
5	Hennie Kuiper (NED)	TI–Raleigh–Campagnolo	s.t.
6	Luis Ocaña (ESP)	Super Ser	s.t.
7	José Pesarrodona (ESP)	Kas–Campagnolo	s.t.
8	Pedro Torres (ESP)	Super Ser	s.t.
9	Josef Fuchs (SUI)	Super Ser	+ 1' 44"
10	Enrique Martínez Heredia (ESP)	Kas–Campagnolo	s.t.

General classification after Stage 16

Rank	Rider	Team	Time
1	Hennie Kuiper (NED)	TI–Raleigh–Campagnolo	78h 17' 53"
2	Luis Ocaña (ESP)	Super Ser	+ 25"
3	José Pesarrodona (ESP)	Kas–Campagnolo	+ 48"
4	José Nazabal (ESP)	Kas–Campagnolo	+ 54"
5	Ludo Loos (BEL)	Ebo–Cinzia	+ 1' 25"
6	Vicente López Carril (ESP)	Kas–Campagnolo	+ 1' 31"
7	Dietrich Thurau (FRG)	TI–Raleigh–Campagnolo	+ 2' 51"
8	Pedro Torres (ESP)	Super Ser	+ 3' 25"
9	Josef Fuchs (SUI)	Super Ser	+ 3' 43"
10	Joaquim Agostinho (POR)	Teka	+ 3' 47"

== Stage 17 ==
14 May 1976 - Reinosa to Bilbao, 183 km (114 mi)

Route:

Stage 17 result

Rank	Rider	Team	Time
1	Arthur Van De Vijver (BEL)	Flandria–Velda–West Vlaams Vleesbedrijf	5h 01' 55"
2	Andrés Gandarias (ESP)	Teka	+ 15"
3	Willy Scheers (BEL)	Zoppas–Splendor–Sinalco	+ 3' 04"
4	Aad Van Den Hoek (NED)	TI–Raleigh–Campagnolo	+ 3' 25"
5	Domingo Perurena (ESP)	Kas–Campagnolo	+ 3' 32"
6	Francisco Elorriaga (ESP)	Super Ser	s.t.
7	Cees Priem (NED)	Frisol–Gazelle	s.t.
8	Jan van Katwijk (NED)	TI–Raleigh–Campagnolo	s.t.
9	Julien Van Lint (BEL)	Ebo–Cinzia	s.t.
10	Roger Gilson (LUX)	Frisol–Gazelle	s.t.

General classification after Stage 17

Rank	Rider	Team	Time
1	Hennie Kuiper (NED)	TI–Raleigh–Campagnolo	83h 23' 30"
2	Luis Ocaña (ESP)	Super Ser	+ 25"
3	José Pesarrodona (ESP)	Kas–Campagnolo	+ 48"
4	José Nazabal (ESP)	Kas–Campagnolo	+ 54"
5	Vicente López Carril (ESP)	Kas–Campagnolo	+ 1' 31"
6	Dietrich Thurau (FRG)	TI–Raleigh–Campagnolo	+ 2' 51"
7	Pedro Torres (ESP)	Super Ser	+ 3' 25"
8	Josef Fuchs (SUI)	Super Ser	+ 3' 43"
9	Joaquim Agostinho (POR)	Teka	+ 3' 47"
10	Ludo Loos (BEL)	Ebo–Cinzia	+ 5' 35"

== Stage 18 ==
15 May 1976 - Galdácano to Santuario de Oro (Zuia), 204 km (127 mi)

Route:

Stage 18 result

Rank	Rider	Team	Time
1	Dietrich Thurau (FRG)	TI–Raleigh–Campagnolo	5h 43' 56"
2	Enrique Cima (ESP)	Novostil–Transmallorca	+ 6"
3	Manuel Esparza (ESP)	Teka	+ 15"
4	Ludo Loos (BEL)	Ebo–Cinzia	s.t.
5	Vicente López Carril (ESP)	Kas–Campagnolo	s.t.
6	José Pesarrodona (ESP)	Kas–Campagnolo	s.t.
7	José Nazabal (ESP)	Kas–Campagnolo	+ 21"
8	Julián Andiano (ESP)	Teka	s.t.
9	Joaquim Agostinho (POR)	Teka	s.t.
10	Gonzalo Aja (ESP)	Teka	+ 27"

General classification after Stage 18

Rank	Rider	Team	Time
1	Hennie Kuiper (NED)	TI–Raleigh–Campagnolo	89h 08' 27"
2	Luis Ocaña (ESP)	Super Ser	+ 2"
3	José Pesarrodona (ESP)	Kas–Campagnolo	s.t.
4	José Nazabal (ESP)	Kas–Campagnolo	+ 14"
5	Vicente López Carril (ESP)	Kas–Campagnolo	+ 45"
6	Dietrich Thurau (FRG)	TI–Raleigh–Campagnolo	+ 1' 50"
7	Pedro Torres (ESP)	Super Ser	+ 3' 02"
8	Joaquim Agostinho (POR)	Teka	+ 3' 07"
9	Josef Fuchs (SUI)	Super Ser	+ 3' 20"
10	Ludo Loos (BEL)	Ebo–Cinzia	+ 5' 49"

== Stage 19a ==
16 May 1976 - Murgia (Zuia) to San Sebastián, 139 km (86 mi)

Route:

Stage 19a result

Rank	Rider	Team	Time
1	Dirk Ongenae (BEL)	Flandria–Velda–West Vlaams Vleesbedrijf	3h 25' 48"
2	Cees Priem (NED)	Frisol–Gazelle	+ 6"
3	Julien Van Lint (BEL)	Ebo–Cinzia	+ 15"
4	Jan van Katwijk (NED)	TI–Raleigh–Campagnolo	s.t.
5	Francisco Elorriaga (ESP)	Super Ser	s.t.
6	Dietrich Thurau (FRG)	TI–Raleigh–Campagnolo	s.t.
7	Domingo Perurena (ESP)	Kas–Campagnolo	s.t.
8	Gerben Karstens (NED)	TI–Raleigh–Campagnolo	s.t.
9	Julián Andiano (ESP)	Teka	s.t.
10	Arthur Van De Vijver (BEL)	Flandria–Velda–West Vlaams Vleesbedrijf	s.t.

== Stage 19b ==
17 May 1976 - San Sebastián to San Sebastián, 31.7 km (19.7 mi) (ITT)

Stage 19b result

Rank	Rider	Team	Time
1	Dietrich Thurau (FRG)	TI–Raleigh–Campagnolo	44' 44"
2	José Pesarrodona (ESP)	Kas–Campagnolo	+ 1"
3	Juan Manuel Santisteban (ESP)	Kas–Campagnolo	+ 12"
4	José Antonio González (ESP)	Kas–Campagnolo	+ 14"
5	Joaquim Agostinho (POR)	Teka	+ 20"
6	Josef Fuchs (SUI)	Super Ser	+ 26"
7	Francisco Elorriaga (ESP)	Super Ser	+ 52"
8	Luis Ocaña (ESP)	Super Ser	+ 1' 02"
9	Vicente López Carril (ESP)	Kas–Campagnolo	+ 1' 04"
10	Cees Priem (NED)	Frisol–Gazelle	+ 1' 10"

General classification after Stage 19b

Rank	Rider	Team	Time
1	José Pesarrodona (ESP)	Kas–Campagnolo	93h 19' 10"
2	Luis Ocaña (ESP)	Super Ser	+ 1' 03"
3	José Nazabal (ESP)	Kas–Campagnolo	+ 1' 41"
4	Dietrich Thurau (FRG)	TI–Raleigh–Campagnolo	+ 1' 44"
5	Vicente López Carril (ESP)	Kas–Campagnolo	+ 1' 50"
6	Hennie Kuiper (NED)	TI–Raleigh–Campagnolo	+ 2' 00"
7	Joaquim Agostinho (POR)	Teka	+ 3' 26"
8	Josef Fuchs (SUI)	Super Ser	+ 3' 45"
9	Pedro Torres (ESP)	Super Ser	+ 4' 43"
10	José Antonio González (ESP)	Kas–Campagnolo	+ 7' 18"
