= 1976 Vuelta a España =

Race details
- Dates: 27 April – 16 May
- Stages: 19 stages + Prologue, including 1 split stages
- Distance: 3,340 km (2,075 mi)
- Winning time: 93h 19' 10"

Results
Jersey awarded to the overall winner	Winner	José Pesarrodona (ESP)	(Kas - Campagnolo)
	Second	Luis Ocaña (ESP)	(Super Ser)
	Third	José Nazabal (ESP)	(Kas - Campagnolo)
Jersey awarded to the points classification winner	Points	Dietrich Thurau (FRG)	(TI Raleigh)
Jersey awarded to the mountains classification winner	Mountains	Andrés Oliva (ESP)	(Kas - Campagnolo)
	Sprints	Daniel Verplancke (BEL)	(Flandria - Velda)
	Team	Kas - Campagnolo	

The 31st Edition Vuelta a España (Tour of Spain), a long-distance bicycle stage race and one of the three grand tours, was held from 27 April to 16 May 1976. It consisted of 19 stages covering a total of 3,340 km (2,080 mi), and was won by José Pesarrodona of the Kas-Campagnolo cycling team. Andres Oliva won the mountains classification while Dietrich Thurau won the points classification.

== Route ==
List of stages
Stage	Date	Course	Distance	Type	Winner
P	27 April	Estepona to Estepona	3.2 km (2 mi)	Individual time trial	Dietrich Thurau (FRG)
1	28 April	Estepona to Estepona	135 km (84 mi)		José De Cauwer (BEL)
2	29 April	Estepona to Priego de Córdoba	224 km (139 mi)		Roger Gilson (LUX)
3	30 April	Priego de Córdoba to Jaén	177 km (110 mi)		Theo Smit (NED)
4	1 May	Jaén to Baza	166 km (103 mi)		Hennie Kuiper (NED)
5	2 May	Baza to Cartagena	201 km (125 mi)		Theo Smit (NED)
6	3 May	Cartagena to Cartagena	14 km (9 mi)	Individual time trial	Joaquim Agostinho (POR)
7	4 May	Cartagena to Murcia	136 km (85 mi)		Ferdi Van Den Haute (BEL)
8	5 May	Murcia to Almansa	219 km (136 mi)		Georges Pintens (BEL)
9	6 May	Almansa to Nules	208 km (129 mi)		Dietrich Thurau (FRG)
10	7 May	Castellón to Cambrils	226 km (140 mi)		José Antonio González (ESP)
11	8 May	Cambrils to Barcelona	151 km (94 mi)		Antonio Vallori (ESP)
12	9 May	Pamplona to Logroño	168 km (104 mi)		Gerben Karstens (NED)
13	10 May	Logroño to Palencia	209 km (130 mi)		Dirk Ongenae (BEL)
14	11 May	Paredes de Nava to Gijón	249 km (155 mi)		Cees Priem (NED)
15	12 May	Gijón to Cangas de Onís	141 km (88 mi)		Vicente López Carril (ESP)
16	13 May	Cangas de Onís to Reinosa	156 km (97 mi)		Dietrich Thurau (FRG)
17	14 May	Reinosa to Bilbao	183 km (114 mi)		Arthur Van De Vijver (BEL)
18	15 May	Galdácano to Santuario de Oro (Zuia)	204 km (127 mi)		Dietrich Thurau (FRG)
19a	16 May	Murgia (Zuia) to San Sebastián	139 km (86 mi)		Dirk Ongenae (BEL)
19b	17 May	San Sebastián to San Sebastián	31.7 km (20 mi)	Individual time trial	Dietrich Thurau (FRG)
	Total		3,340 km (2,075 mi)		

== Doping cases ==
When Belgian cyclist Eric Jacques finished in second place in the eighth stage, he became the new leader. Later, it became known that he tested positive for doping after that stage, and he received a penalty of ten minutes. Previously, Günter Haritz had been penalized for the same offence, and had left the race.

== Results ==
=== Final General Classification ===
Rank	Rider	Team	Time
1	(Spain) José Pesarrodona	Kas-Campagnolo	93h 19' 10"
2	(Spain) Luis Ocaña	Super Ser Zeus	+ 1' 03"
3	(Spain) José Nazabal Merendia	Kas-Campagnolo	+ 1' 41"
4	(West Germany) Dietrich Thurau	TI–Raleigh	+ 1' 44"
5	(Spain) Vicente Lopez	Kas-Campagnolo	+ 1' 50"
6	(Netherlands) Hennie Kuiper	TI–Raleigh	+ 2' 00"
7	(Portugal) Joaquim Agostinho	Teka	+ 3' 16"
8	(Switzerland) Joseph Fuchs	Super Ser Zeus	+ 3' 45"
9	(Spain) Pedro Torres	Super Ser Zeus	+ 4' 43"
10	(Spain) José Antonio Gonzalez	Kas-Campagnolo	+ 7' 18"
11	(Belgium) Ludo Loos	Ebo	
12	(Spain) Enrique Martinez	Kas-Campagnolo	
13	(Spain) Andres Oliva	Kas-Campagnolo	
14	(Spain) Gonzalo Aja Barguin	Teka	
15	(Portugal) José Martins Freitas	Kas-Campagnolo	
16	(Belgium) Eric Jacques	Ebo	
17	(Spain) Domingo Perurena	Kas-Campagnolo	
18	(Belgium) Jean-Pierre Baert	Miko-De Gribaldy	
19	(Spain) José Enrique Cima	Novostil	
20	(Portugal) Fernardo Mendes Dos	Teka	
21	(Spain) Ventura Diaz	Teka	
22	(Spain) Santiago Lazcano	Super Ser Zeus	
23	(Spain) Julian Andiano	Teka	
24	(Spain) Manuel Esparza	Teka	
25	(Spain) Jesus Manzaneque	Super Ser Zeus	
