= Doniger =

Doniger is a surname. Notable people with the surname include:

- Sundel Doniger (1888–1972), Polish-born American businessman
- Walter Doniger (1917–2011), American film and television director
- Wendy Doniger (born 1940), American Indologist

== See also ==
- David D. Doniger & Company
