= Tour du Gévaudan Occitanie =

French multi-day road cycling race

Tour du Gévaudan Languedoc-Roussillon
Race details
- Date: September
- Region: Languedoc-Roussillon
- Discipline: Road
- Competition: UCI Europe Tour
- Type: Stage race
- Organiser: Lozère Sport Organisation
- Race director: Benoît Malaval
- Web site: tourdugevaudan.unblog.fr

History
- First edition: 1973
- Editions: 31 (as of 2018)
- First winner: Bernard Bourreau (FRA)
- Most wins: Michel Charlier (FRA) (2 wins)
- Most recent: Jaakko Hänninen (FIN)

The Tour du Gévaudan Languedoc-Roussillon is a multi-day road cycling race that has been held annually in France since 2010. It was part of UCI Europe Tour in category 2.1 until 2019 when it was replaced with a women's and men's junior race, and was moved from September to April.

== Winners ==
Year	Country	Rider	Team
1973	France	Bernard Bourreau	France national team
1974	France	Michel Charlier	France national team
1975	France	Bernard Vallet	Peugeot Nice
1976	France	Joël Millard	CR4C Roanne
1977	France	Michel Charlier	Peugeot Nice
1978– 1979	No race		
1980	France	Philippe Chevallier	Dauphiné Savoie
1981	France	Etienne Néant	Dauphiné Savoie
1982	France	Jean-Marie Landher	EC Colmar
1983	France	Bernard Pinneau	CC Marmande
1984	France	Bernard Faussurier	CR4C Roanne
1985	France	Jean-Paul Garde	Stade Auxerrois
1986	France	Fabrice Lagrange	Stade Auxerrois
1987	France	Denis Jusseau	Stade Auxerrois
1988	France	Philippe Delaurier	Flandres Artois
1989	Colombia	Luis Felipe Moreno	Colombia national team
1990	Soviet Union	Eugeny Anaskine	Soviet Union national team
1991	Lithuania	Artūras Kasputis	Lithuania national team
1992	France	Pascal Hervé	Niort
1993	France	Pascal Churin	AS Corbeil Essonne
1994– 2005	No race		
2006	France	Ludovic Martin	VC Lyon-Vaulx-en-Velin
2007	Estonia	Tanel Kangert	Roue d'or Saint-Amandoise
2008	Poland	Mateusz Taciak	CC Étupes
2009	Germany	David Rösch	Atlas Romer's Hausbäckerei
2010	France	Jérôme Coppel	Saur–Sojasun
2011	France	Guillaume Levarlet	Saur–Sojasun
2012	Italy	Davide Rebellin	Meridiana–Kamen
2013	France	Yoann Bagot	Cofidis
2014	Spain	Amets Txurruka	Caja Rural–Seguros RGA
2015	France	Thibaut Pinot	FDJ
2016	No race		
2017	France	Guillaume Martin	Wanty–Groupe Gobert
2018	Finland	Jaakko Hänninen	Probikeshop Saint-Étienne Loire
