= 1976 Dwars door België =

Race details
- Dates: 21 March 1976
- Stages: 1
- Distance: 206 km (128.0 mi)
- Winning time: 5h 12' 00"

Results
	Winner	Willy Planckaert (BEL)
	Second	Marc Demeyer (BEL)
	Third	Walter Planckaert (BEL)

The 1976 Dwars door België was the 31st edition of the Dwars door Vlaanderen cycle race and was held on 21 March 1976. The race started and finished in Waregem. The race was won by Willy Planckaert.

== General classification ==
Final general classification

Rank	Rider	Time
1	Willy Planckaert (BEL)	5h 12' 00"
2	Marc Demeyer (BEL)	+ 0"
3	Walter Planckaert (BEL)	+ 1' 50"
4	Cees Priem (NED)	+ 1' 50"
5	Serge Vandaele (BEL)	+ 3' 15"
6	Theo Smit (NED)	+ 3' 15"
7	Luc Leman (BEL)	+ 3' 15"
8	Bernard Bourguignon (BEL)	+ 3' 15"
9	Daniel Verplancke (BEL)	+ 3' 15"
10	Luc D'Hondt (BEL)	+ 3' 15"
