= Seraing–Aachen–Seraing =

Recurring sporting event

Race details
- Date: March, April, May
- Region: Wallonia (Belgium), North Rhine-Westphalia (Germany)
- English name: Seraing–Aachen–Seraing
- Local name(s): Seraing–Aken–Seraing (Dutch), Seraing–Aix–Seraing (French)
- Discipline: Road
- Type: One-day

History
- First edition: 1968
- Editions: 29
- Final edition: 2001
- First winner: Rik Van Looy (BEL)
- Final winner: Frederik Willems (BEL)

Seraing–Aachen–Seraing was a men's cycling race organized for the last time in 2001. The race was run between Seraing, Belgium and Aachen, (West) Germany.

The competition's roll of honor includes the success of Rik Van Looy and Frank Vandenbroucke.

== Winners ==
Year	Winner	Second	Third
1968	(Belgium) Rik Van Looy	(Belgium) Guy Vallée	(Netherlands) Evert Dolman
1969	(Belgium) Joseph Bruyère	(Belgium) Marcel Grifnée	(Italy) Serge Del Amore
1970	(Belgium) Daniel Verjans	(Belgium) André Doyen	(Belgium) Yves Rappe
1971	(Belgium) Herman Beysens	(Belgium) Guy Minsart	(Belgium) Ludo Noels
1972	(Belgium) Ludo Noels	(Belgium) Georges Bortels	(Netherlands) Jan Stepgens
1973	(Belgium) Bernard Bourguignon	(Belgium) Ludo Noels	(Belgium) Hugo Serin
1974	(Belgium) Benny Schepmans	(Netherlands) Henk Smits	(Netherlands) Bennie Ceulen
1975	(Netherlands) André Gevers	(Belgium) Jean-Pierre Henrard	(Italy) Maurice Bellet
1976	(Belgium) Etienne De Beule	(Belgium) René Martens	(Belgium) Emile De Haes
1977	(Belgium) Daniel Willems	(Belgium) Guido Van Calster	(Belgium) Ludo Wijnants
1978	(Belgium) Etienne De Wilde	(Belgium) Guy Nulens	(Belgium) Ortaire Goossens
1979	(Belgium) Luc Govaerts	(Netherlands) Ad Van Peer	(Netherlands) Jan Feyken
1980	(Belgium) Luc De Decker	(Netherlands) Peter Winnen	(Belgium) Patrick Onnockx
1981	(Belgium) Luc Lamers	(Belgium) Ronny Penxten	(Belgium) Rudy Busselen
1982	(Belgium) Dirk De Wolf	(Belgium) Eric Vanderaerden	(Belgium) Patrick Degaudinne
1983	(Belgium) Diederick Foubert	(Netherlands) Peter Schroen	(Belgium) Eric Van Rooy
1984	(Belgium) Michel Vermote	(Netherlands) Dirk Van Verre	(Belgium) Aloïs Wouters
1985–1986	No race		
1987	(Netherlands) Ton Zwirs	(Netherlands) Johnny Broers	(Netherlands) Peter Schroen
1988	(Norway) Bo André Namtvedt	(Belgium) Patrick Schoovaerts	(Belgium) Daniel Beelen
1989	(Belgium) Stefan De Beleyr	(Belgium) Mario De Clercq	(Belgium) Philippe Mathy
1990	(Belgium) Wilfried Nelissen	(Belgium) Serge Baguet	(Belgium) Marc Wauters
1991	(Belgium) Patrick Evenepoel	(Belgium) Wim Vervoort	(Belgium) Pierre Herinne
1992	(Netherlands) Rob Compas	(Netherlands) John De Braber	(Netherlands) Martin Van Steen
1993	(Belgium) Frank Vandenbroucke	(Belgium) Axel Merckx	(Belgium) Michel Nottebart
1994	(Belgium) Steven Van Aken	(Netherlands) Casper Van Der Meer	(Belgium) Geert Verheyen
1995	(Belgium) Sébastien Demarbaix	(Belgium) Thierry Marichal	(Belgium) Rik Verbrugge
1996	(Netherlands) Erik Dekker	(Netherlands) Eddy Bouwmans	(Netherlands) Michael Boogerd
1997	(Belgium) Rudy Trouve	(Belgium) Bert De Waele	(Belgium) Renaud Boxus
1998	(Belgium) Davy Daniels	(Belgium) Koen Das	(Belgium) Danny Van Looy
1999	(Belgium) Staf Scheirlinckx	(Belgium) Danny Van Looy	(Belgium) Bert De Waele
2000	(Colombia) Marlon Pérez Arango	(Belgium) Bert De Waele	(Netherlands) Edwin Dunning
2001	(Belgium) Frederik Willems	(Belgium) Mario Raes	(Belgium) Johan Dekkers
