= Piet Legierse =

Dutch cyclist

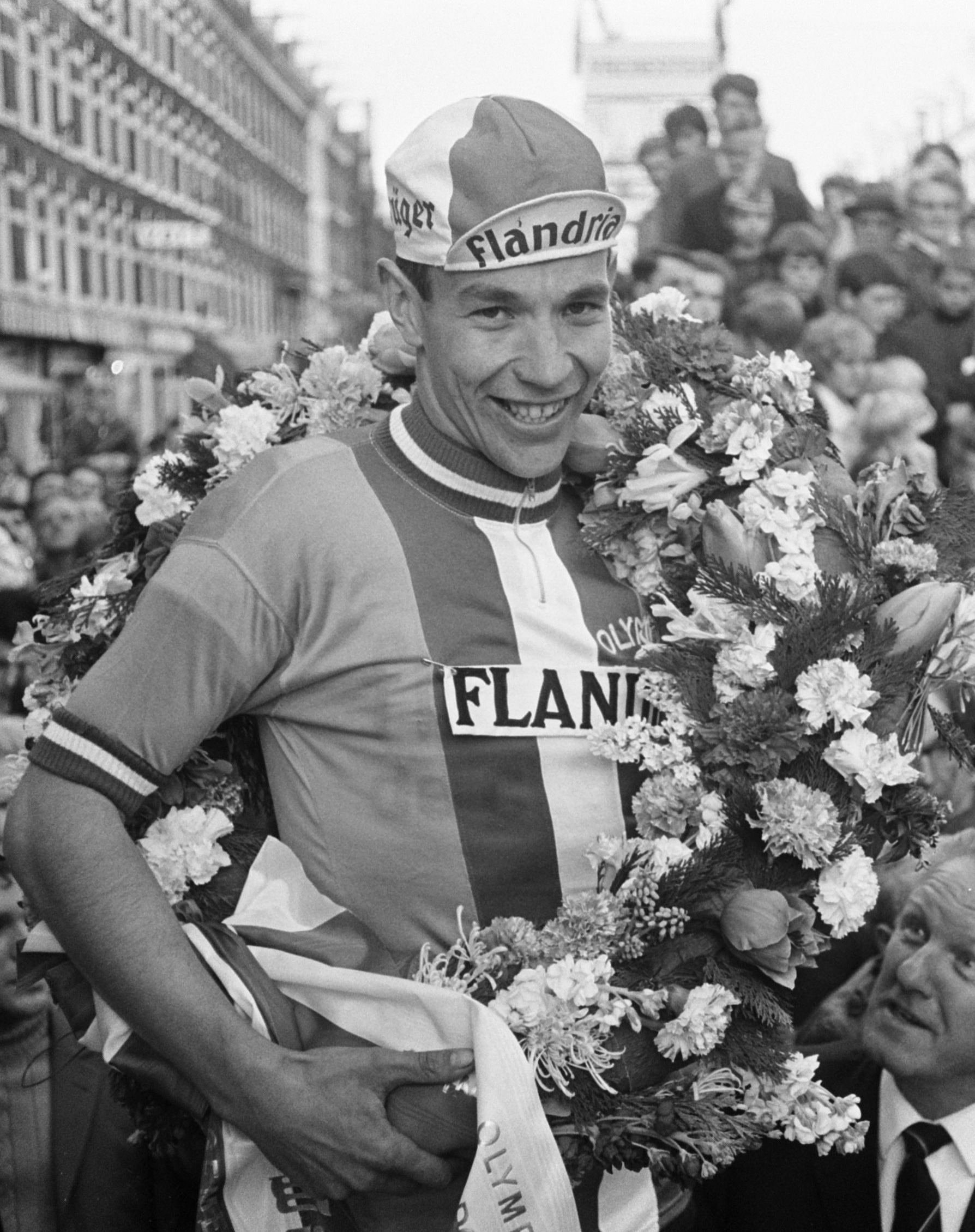
- Piet Legierse at the 1969 Olympia's Tour

Personal information
- Born: 27 February 1946 (age 80) Achthuizen

Sport
- Sport: Cycling

Petrus Antonius Aegidius Gerardus "Piet" Legierse (born 27 February 1946) is a retired Dutch road cyclist who was active between 1965 and 1973. He won the Olympia's Tour in 1969 and one stage of the Tour de Luxembourg in 1970. He married the cyclist Trudy Steenvoort in 1968 or 1969.

In the 1973 International Peace Race, he was part of the Netherlands team (with Ewert Diepeveen, Co Hoogedoorn, Henk Smits, Hermanus Lenferink and Cornelius Boersma).
