= Henk Smits =

Dutch cyclist

Personal information
- Full name: Hendricus Smits
- Born: 7 May 1947 (age 79) Baarlo, Limburg, Netherlands

Cycling career
- Sport: Cycling
- Discipline: Road cycling
- Role: Rider

Amateur teams
- 1971: Ovis
- 1973: Hebro-Flandria
- 1975: Soka Snack's

Major wins
- GC: Tour de Liège (1974); GC: Tour de la Province de Namur (1974); GC: Sint-Lambrechts-Woluwe (1975)

Hendricus "Henk" Smits (born 7 May 1947 in Baarlo, Limburg) is a former road cyclist from the Netherlands.

== Sporting career ==
Smits began his cycling at the club Olympia Baarlo.

In the 1973 International Peace Race, he was part of the team of the Netherlands (with Ewert Diepeveen, Co Hoogedoorn, Piet Legierse, Hermanus Lenferink and Cornelius Boersma). In the victory of Ryszard Szurkowski, he finished 41st in the final classification.

Smits competed for the Dutch amateur cycling teams Ovis and Hebro-Flandria. Competing as an amateur, Smits raced in the 1973 Tour de Pologne and Course de la Paix; in the 1974 DDR-Rundfahrt; and in the 1976 Milk Race.

=== Achievements ===
Smits was the overall winner at the 1974 Tour de Liège, including one stage victory; and also won the Tour de la Province de Namur the same year. He came 2nd in the 1974 Seraing–Aachen–Seraing men's cycling race. In the 1974 GDR Tour Smits finished fourth in the 6th stage: Dessau - Nordhausen, 143 kilometres (89 mi), on 5 September 1974, and fifth in the 7th stage: Quer durch den Harz, 134 kilometres (83 mi), the following day (both stages were also classified as Harzrundfahrts). Smits achieved 14th place in the overall individual classification.

In 1975, Smits won a stage of the Tour de Liège; and was the overall winner of the Sint-Lambrechts-Woluwe in Belgium.

Throughout 1976, Smits competed in the United Kingdom, with podium places but without a major stage victory. Competing in Belgium in 1977 through to 1980, Smits' major achievement was being the overall general classification winner in a 1978 road race held in Yvoir, Belgium. He also won the Staveslot Tour in 1979. In 1981, he came third in the Romsée-Stavelot-Romsée (RSR) cycling race in Belgium (Liège province).
