= Ibn al-Qatta' al-Yahsubi =

10th-century Andalusi Arab vizier

Ibn al-Qatta' al-Yahsubi إبن القطاع اليحصبي
- Born: 10th century Priego
- Died: c. 1006; Cordoba
- Other names: Isa ibn Sa'id
- Occupations: Vizier and secretary

Īsā Ibn Saʿīd al-Yaḥṣubī (Arabic: عيسى بن سعيد اليحصبي; died 397 AH (1006 AD)), better known as Ibn al-Qaṭṭāʿ (إبن القطاع), was a 10th-century Andalusi Arab katib (كاتب; transl. 'secretary') and wazir (وزير; transl. 'Vizier') of the Umayyad Caliphate of Córdoba.

== Biography ==
Ibn al-Qatta' was born in the region of Priego (located in the present-day province of Cordoba) to a family of humble status. They descended from the al-Najjar clan, a branch of an Arab tribe known as Banu al-Jaziri which settled in the Iberian peninsula following the Umayyad conquest. He was the son of a schoolmaster in his native town of Priego. Ibn al-Qatta' was first appointed to the position of vizier during the reign of the Umayyad caliph Hisham II (r. 976–1009) and the de facto ruler of this period, Hisham's chamberlain, Almanzor (d. 1002). Subsequently, Ibn al-Qatta' would continue in his position as a vizier under the rule of Almanzor's successor and son, al-Muzaffar (d. 1008).
