= Maurizio Bellet =

Italian cyclist

Personal information
- Born: 18 November 1952 (age 73) Liège, Belgium

Cycling career
- Sport: Cycling
- Role: Rider

Maurizio Bellet (born 18 November 1952) is an Italian former professional racing cyclist. He rode in the 1976 Tour de France and 1979 Tour de France.
