= Guy Dolhats =

French cyclist

Personal information
- Born: 14 October 1952 (age 74) Tarnos, France

Cycling career
- Sport: Cycling
- Role: Rider

Guy Dolhats (born 14 October 1952) is a French former professional racing cyclist. His sporting career began with ACBB Paris. He rode in the 1976 Tour de France.
