= José De Cauwer =

Belgian cyclist (born 1949)

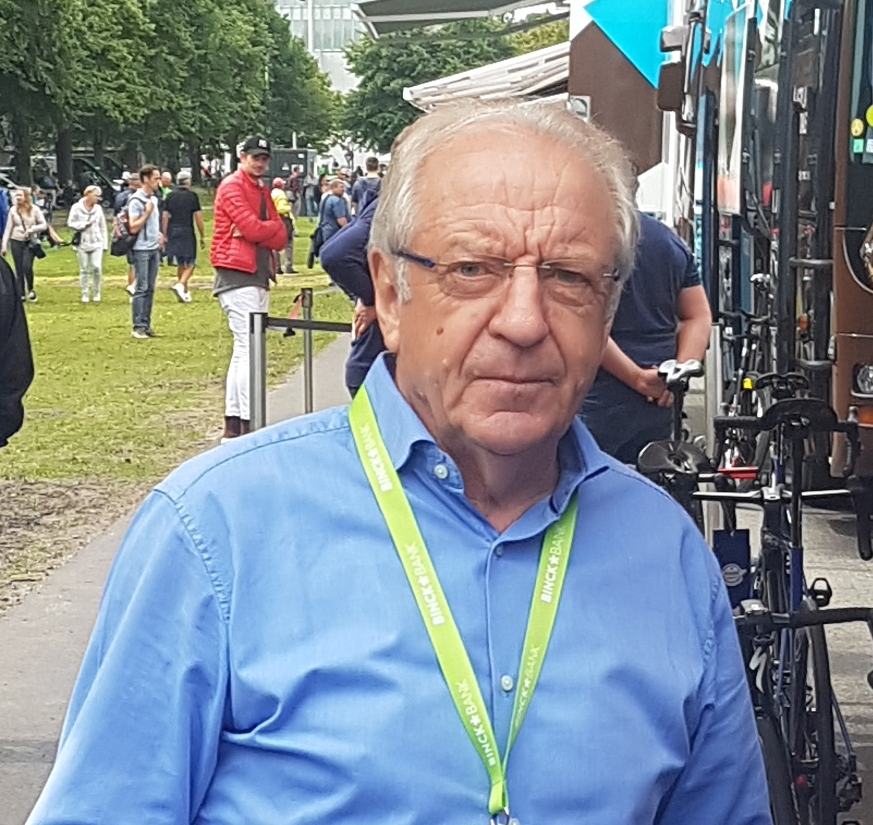
- De Cauwer in 2019

Personal information
- Born: 25 September 1949 (age 77) Temse, Belgium

Cycling career
- Sport: Cycling
- Role: Rider
- Rider type: domestique

Professional teams
- 1973–1974: Sonolor
- 1975: Frisol–G.B.C.
- 1976–1978: TI–Raleigh
- 1979–1980: Peugeot–Esso–Michelin

José De Cauwer (born 25 September 1949) is a Belgian former professional racing cyclist and team manager.

De Cauwer rode in five editions of the Tour de France. De Cauwer won one stage in the 1976 Vuelta a España after which he held the red jersey for three days. He also won a stage in the 1978 Tour of Belgium. With TI–Raleigh he won the team time trials of stage 5a of the 1976 Tour de France and stage 4 of the 1978 Tour de France. De Cauwer is known for being the super domestique of Hennie Kuiper.

After ending his cycling career, De Cauwer was team manager of ADR; the ADR won the Tour of Flanders and Paris–Roubaix in 1988, and with which Greg LeMond won the 1989 Tour de France. In 1997 he became team manager of the Belgian national cycling team. He retired as national team manager in 2005 after Tom Boonen's win in Madrid. Until the end of 2008 he was manager of the youth education of Silence–Lotto.

De Cauwer is co-commentator for cycling races on the public broadcaster VRT.
