= Henri Fin =

French cyclist

Personal information
- Born: 20 March 1950 (age 76) Wambrechies, France

Cycling career
- Sport: Cycling

Henri Fin (born 20 March 1950) is a former French cyclist. He competed in the team time trial at the 1972 Summer Olympics.
