= Guy Maingon =

French cyclist

Personal information
- Born: 31 July 1948 (age 78) Blonville-sur-Mer, France

Cycling career
- Sport: Cycling
- Role: Rider

Guy Maingon (born 31 July 1948) is a French former professional racing cyclist. He rode in the 1976 Tour de France.
