= Roland Smet =

French cyclist

Personal information
- Born: 18 December 1952 (age 73) Saint-Étienne, Loire, France

Cycling career
- Sport: Cycling
- Role: Rider

Roland Smet (French pronunciation: [ʁɔlɑ̃ smɛt]; born 18 December 1952) is a French former professional racing cyclist. He rode in the 1976 Tour de France.
