= Eric Loder =

Swiss cyclist

Personal information
- Born: 20 July 1952 (age 74)

Cycling career
- Sport: Cycling
- Role: Rider

Eric Loder (born 20 July 1952) is a Swiss racing cyclist. He rode in the 1976 Tour de France.
