= David D. Doniger & Company =

US manufacturer of branded sportswear

- Formerly: McGregor-Doniger
- Industry: Sportswear
- Founded: 1921; 105 years ago
- Founder: David D. Doniger
- Defunct: 1977
- Fate: Acquired by Rapid-American
- Headquarters: New York City, United States
- Number of locations: 7000 (1956)
- Area served: United States

David D. Doniger & Company was a manufacturer of branded sportswear in the United States founded in 1921. It was the largest such US company in the mid-twentieth century, with sales of $50,000,000 in 7,000 outlets in 1956. Its home office was located at 666 Fifth Avenue (Manhattan).

Formerly a prominent exporter, tariff barriers and dollar shortages reduced its overseas markets.

== McGregor sportswear ==
David D. Doniger imported his first line of clothes from Scotland and selected the McGregor label to go with it. In 1956 it licensed companies in eight foreign countries to produce sportswear using its McGregor label.

The firm changed its name to McGregor-Doniger. William and Harry E. Doniger (March 13, 1904 – January 3, 1961), the sons of David D. Doniger, succeeded their father as heads of McGregor-Doniger. Harry E. Doniger was credited with making colorful men's sportswear popular. In 1955 he was chosen Man of the Year for the Men's Wear industry.

McGregor-Doniger was purchased by Rapid-American in 1977.
