= Cees Priem =

Dutch cyclist

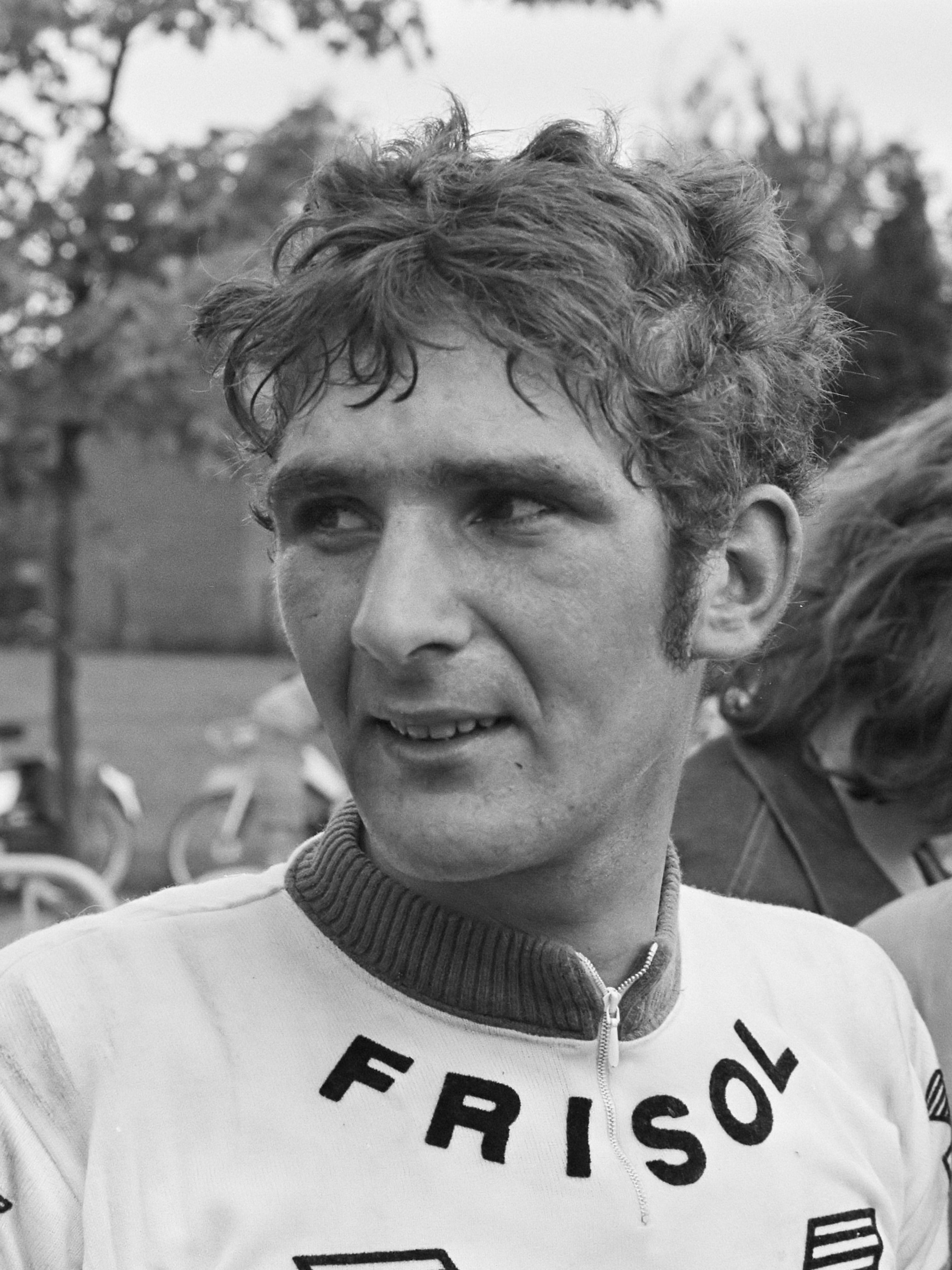

Personal information
- Full name: Cees Priem
- Born: 27 October 1950 (age 76) Ovezande, Netherlands
- Height: 1.83 m (6 ft 0 in)
- Weight: 75 kg (165 lb)

Cycling career
- Sport: Cycling
- Discipline: Road
- Role: Rider; Manager

Professional teams
- 1973–1977: Frisol
- 1978–1983: TI–Raleigh–McGregor
- 1984–1987: Kwantum–Decosol–Yoko

Managerial team
- 1988–1998: TVM–Van Schilt

Major wins
- Grand Tours Tour de France 2 individual stages (1975, 1980) Vuelta a España 2 individual stages (1976, 1977) Stage races Three Days of De Panne (1983) One-day races and Classics National Road Race Championships (1974) Dwars door België (1975)

Cees Priem (born 27 October 1950) is a retired Dutch professional road bicycle racer. He competed in the individual road race and team time trial events at the 1972 Summer Olympics. After his cycling career, Priem became team manager of TVM, where, as part of the Festina affair, it was found he was involved in the team's doping program.

== Major results ==
1968
2nd De Vlaamse Pijl
1970
1st Ronde van Midden-Zeeland
1971
1st Overall Olympia's Tour
1st Stages 2, 3 & 6 Tour of Austria
3rd Ronde van Limburg
1972
1st Overall Circuit de Saône-et-Loire
1st Stages 2 (TTT) & 6 Milk Race
1st Stage 8 Tour de l'Avenir
1973
1st Ster van Zwolle
1st Stage 2 Olympia's Tour
6th Overall Tour du Nord
1974
1st Road race, National Road Championships
1st Ronde van Gelderland
1st Stage 2 Tour de Romandie
5th Nationale Sluitingprijs
7th Overall Étoile des Espoirs
8th Kuurne–Brussels–Kuurne
1975
1st Dwars door België
1st Stage 1a Tour de France
2nd Ronde van Limburg
6th Overall Tour of Belgium
7th Overall Giro di Sardegna
7th Grand Prix de Fourmies
9th Paris–Brussels
10th Paris–Tours
1976
1st Stage 14 Vuelta a España
4th Dwars door België
1977
1st Stage 10 Vuelta a España
3rd Overall Tour of Belgium
5th Overall Three Days of De Panne

1st Prologue (TTT)

5th Grote Prijs Jef Scherens
5th Bordeaux–Paris
8th Paris–Tours
1978
1st Grote Prijs Stad Sint-Niklaas
1st Stage 2 Tour of Belgium
1st Stage 3 Ronde van Nederland
1st Stage 1 Tour of Britain
3rd Overall Three Days of De Panne
8th Grand Prix de Monaco
1979
1st Stabe 1b (TTT) Paris–Nice
1st Stage 6 (TTT) Ronde van Nederland
4th Paris–Brussels
9th Paris–Tours
10th Overall Tour Méditerranéen

1st Stage 1

1980
1st Stages 7a (TTT) 10 Tour de France
2nd Grand Prix d'Antibes
3rd Ronde van Midden-Zeeland
1981
1st Stages 1b (TTT) & 4 (TTT) Tour de France
1st Stage 5a (TTT) Tour of Belgium
2nd Dwars door België
1982
1st Overall Étoile de Bessèges

1st Stage 1

5th Overall Ronde van Nederland

1st Stage 6b (TTT)

8th Dwars door België
1983
1st Overall Three Days of De Panne
2nd Grand Prix La Marseillaise
7th Kuurne–Brussels–Kuurne
1984
1st GP Stad Vilvoorde
6th Omloop van het Houtland

== See also ==
- List of Dutch Olympic cyclists

Sporting positions
Preceded by Joop Zoetemelk	Dutch National Road Race Champion; 1974	Succeeded by Hennie Kuiper
