= Priego de Córdoba =

- Municipality
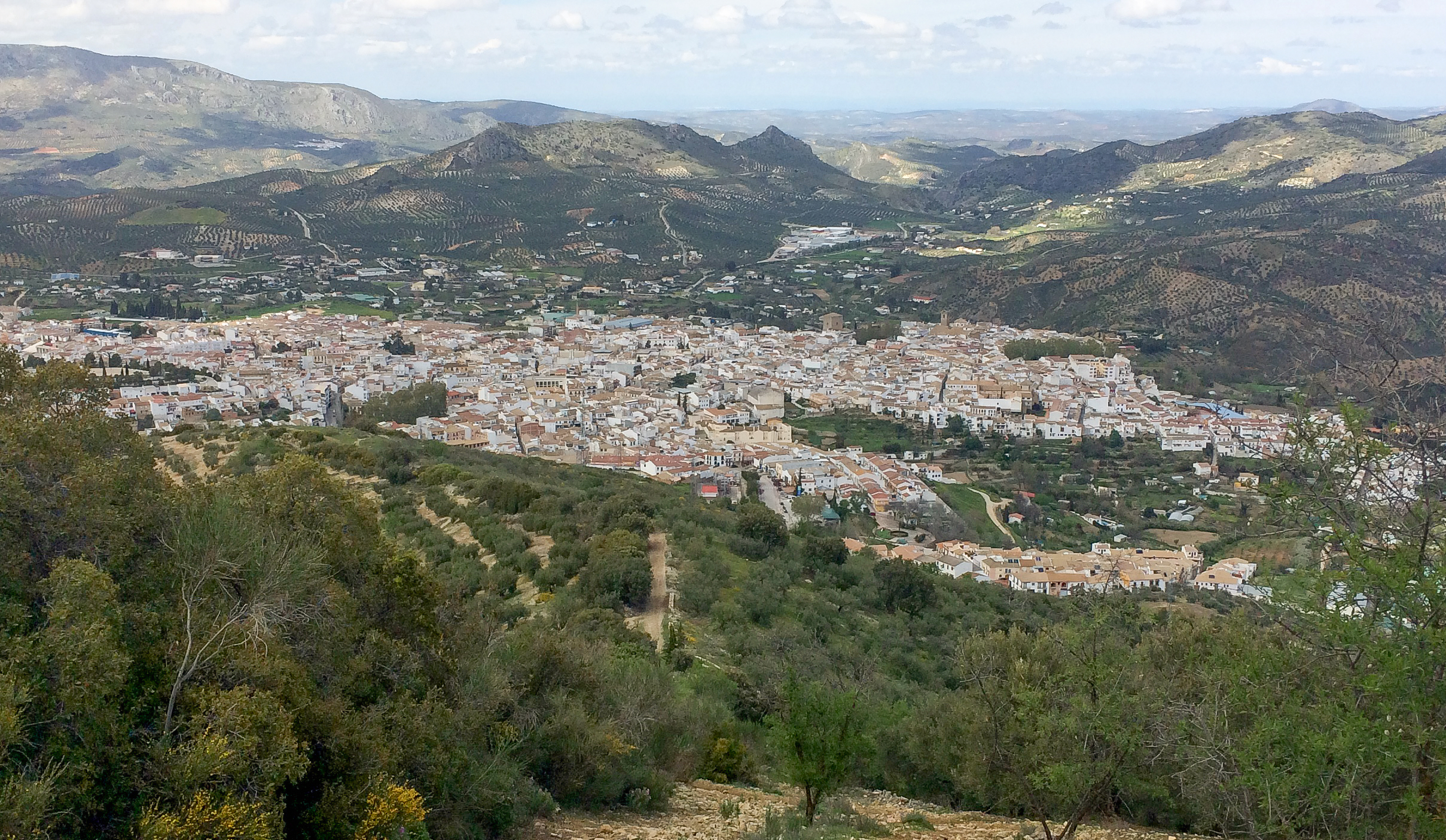

- Coat of arms

- Location in Spain Priego de Córdoba (Andalusia)
- Coordinates: 37°26′N 4°11′W
- Country: Spain
- Autonomous community: Andalusia
- Province: Córdoba

Government
  - Mayor: María Luisa Ceballos (PP)

Area
  - Total: 288.27 km^{2} (111.30 sq mi)
- Elevation: 652 m (2,139 ft)

Population (2025-01-01)
  - Total: 21,764
  - Density: 75.499/km^{2} (195.54/sq mi)
- Demonym: Prieguenses/as
- Time zone: UTC+1 (CET)
  - Summer (DST): UTC+2 (CEST)
- Website: Official website

Priego de Córdoba is a town and municipality of Spain located in the autonomous community of Andalusia. It lies on the southeasternmost end of the province of Córdoba, near the headwater of the Guadajoz, and on the northern slope of the Sierra de Priego. The population in 2015 was 22,936.

== Geography ==
The view from the cliff, known as the "Adarve", is a favorite subject for paintings. From the "Adarve" one sees an over 180° degree expanse of valley and olive grove speckled mountains known as the "Subetica".

The oldest section of Priego is its Barrio de la Villa. It is bordered on one side by the town's natural fortress, a high cliff. The alleys that wind through this part of the town are Moorish in style, decorated with flower pots and religious icons. Some homes still have the ancient tunnel system that went from their cellars (bodegas) to the castle.

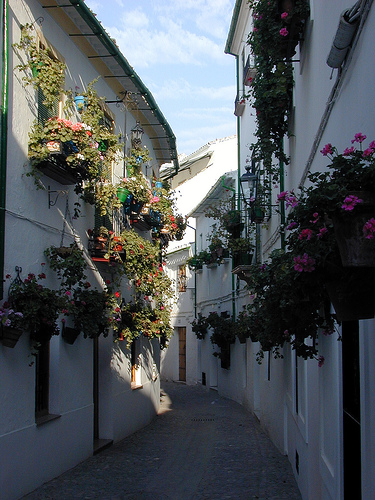
Street view of Priego de Córdoba

== History ==
Priego (Bāguh) may have been founded as a military campsite by Syrian troops of the jund of Damascus after 743.

The earliest verified mention to the place dates to 863, in the context of an Islamic source reporting the contribution of 900 horsemen of Bāguh to a emiral campaign waged against the kingdom of Asturias-León. Rebel forces made incursions in the kūra of Priego in 866 during the Ibn-Hafsun revolt against Umayyad rule, reportedly causing the ruine of the madina. The place was pacified in 921, becoming again the head of a kūra, only to be integrated some years later to the kūra of Elvira. Priego was stormed by a Christian army under Ferdinand III in 1225. It is moot whether it was abandoned or lost, but it was re-acquired in a barter by Ferdinand III during the 1245–46 siege of Jaén, and it was ensuingly entrusted to the Order of Calatrava. It was incorporated the Nasrid Kingdom of Granada either in 1327 or 1332, and was conquered by Castile in 1341.

== Economy ==
Its economy is based on agricultural products, mainly olive oil and cereals. The olive oil from Priego has been given its own denominational label. The olive oils have recently garnered many of the most prestigious prizes in international competitions."Venta del Barón" is the best olive oil in the world since 2014 2015 and 2016.

== Culture ==
=== Holy Week ===
The religious brotherhoods of Priego have a long history, some dating back to before the 16th century. The traditional displays of these brotherhoods in the religious processions of Holy Week (Semana Santa) are renowned for their grandeur and beauty.

The procession on Holy Thursday (Jueves Santo) of the Brotherhood of the Column (Jesus de la Columna), which is the oldest and most prestigious of the town's brotherhoods, and on Holy Friday (Viernes Santo) the Brotherhood of the Nazarenos, in which the procession is of a hand carried float with Christ carrying the cross.

The Nazareno is carried from a church in the center of Priego to a mountain top that overlooks Priego known as the Calavario. Once there a priest comes out of the hermitage there and delivers a benediction.

=== Cuisine ===
The population holds up pastries in the form of roosters or pigs, with a hard boiled egg in the center, known as 'hornazos'. After the benediction it is considered good luck for the coming year to eat the pastry.

== Housing ==
Priego is a village located on the Ruta del Califato (trade route of the Caliphate). It is called “City of the water” because of the many springs and "Jewel of the Baroque Native of Córdoba” for the multitude of its Baroque-style constructions. It has been referred to as “the lock and key to the Kingdom of Granada”.

The oldest section of Priego is its Barrio de la Villa. It is bordered on one side by the town's natural fortress, a high cliff. The alleys that wind through this part of the town are Moorish in style, decorated proudly by the populace with flower pots and religious icons. Some homes retain the ancient tunnel system that went from their cellars (bodegas) to the castle.

Some of the best examples of the Spanish Baroque are found in the numerous churches in Priego. The oldest church was built in the 13th century and subsequently restored; it has a fine chapel. There are ruins (under restoration as of 2006) of a castle having been a fortified city of the Moors (with the Hispano-Arabic name Baguh), eventually captured by the Christians under Ferdinand III in 1225, lost again in 1327, and finally retaken in 1340 by Alfonso XI.

The Barrio de la Villa was given the official title of Historic Centre of Priego in 1972.

== Notable people ==
- Niceto Alcalá-Zamora (1877–1949), Prime Minister and President of the Second Spanish Republic, was from Priego.
- Ibn al-Qatta' al-Yahsubi (10th Century - 1006), Vizier

== See also ==
- List of municipalities in Córdoba
