= Michel Charlier =

French cyclist

Personal information
- Born: 29 April 1949 (age 77) Crèvecoeur-le-Grand, France

Cycling career
- Sport: Cycling
- Role: Rider

Michel Charlier (born 22 April 1949) is a French former professional racing cyclist. He rode in the 1976 Tour de France.
