= Co Hoogedoorn =

Dutch cyclist

Personal information
- Born: 25 September 1952 (age 74) Sloterdijk, Netherlands

Cycling career
- Sport: Cycling
- Role: Rider

Co Hoogedoorn (born 25 September 1952) is a Dutch former professional racing cyclist. He rode in the 1976 Tour de France.

In the 1973 International Peace Race, he was part of the Netherlands team (with Ewert Diepeveen, Henk Smits, Piet Legierse, Hermanus Lenferink and Cornelius Boersma).
