= Arthur Van De Vijver =

Belgian cyclist

Personal information
- Born: 29 February 1948 Breendonk, Belgium
- Died: 9 March 1992 (aged 44) Bornem, Belgium

Cycling career
- Sport: Cycling
- Role: Rider

Arthur Van De Vijver (29 February 1948 – 9 March 1992) was a Belgian racing cyclist. He rode in the 1974 Tour de France.
