= Daniel Verplancke =

Belgian cyclist

Personal information
- Born: 21 September 1948 (age 78)

Cycling career
- Sport: Cycling
- Role: Rider

Daniel Verplancke (born 21 September 1948) is a Belgian racing cyclist. He rode in the 1974 Tour de France.
