= TI–Raleigh =

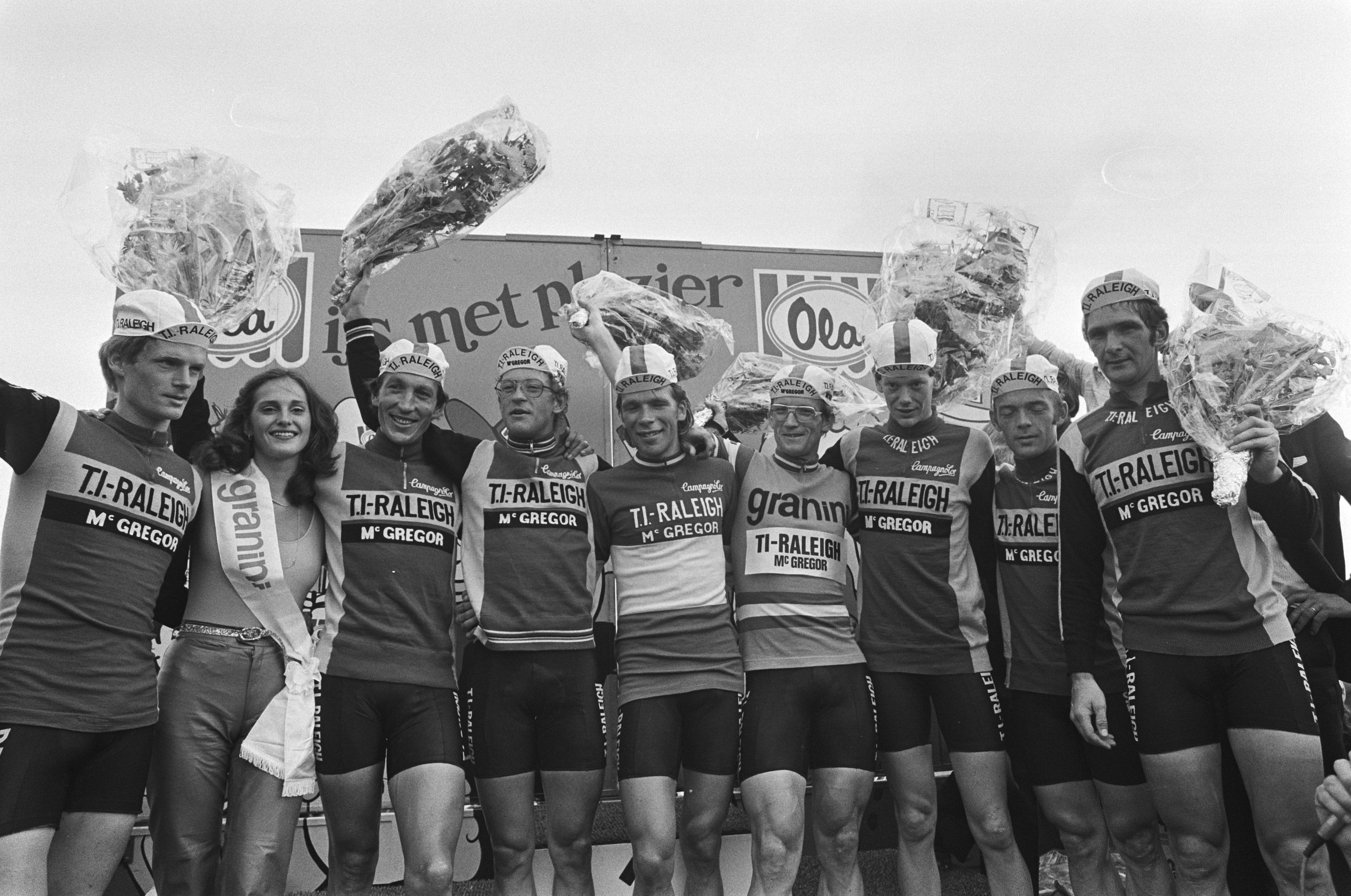
- 1979 Tour of the Netherlands, left to right: Leo van Vliet, Rondemiss, Aad van de Hoek, Gerrie Knetemann, Henk Lubberding, Jan Raas, Bert Oosterbosch, Piet van Katwijk and Cees Priem

Team information
- Registered: Netherlands
- Founded: 1972
- Disbanded: 1983
- Disciplines: Road and track

Key personnel
- General manager: Peter Post

Team name history
- 1972–1975 1976 1977 1978–1979 1980–1981 1982–1983: TI–Raleigh; TI–Raleigh–Campagnolo; TI–Raleigh; TI–Raleigh–McGregor; TI–Raleigh–Creda; TI–Raleigh–Campagnolo
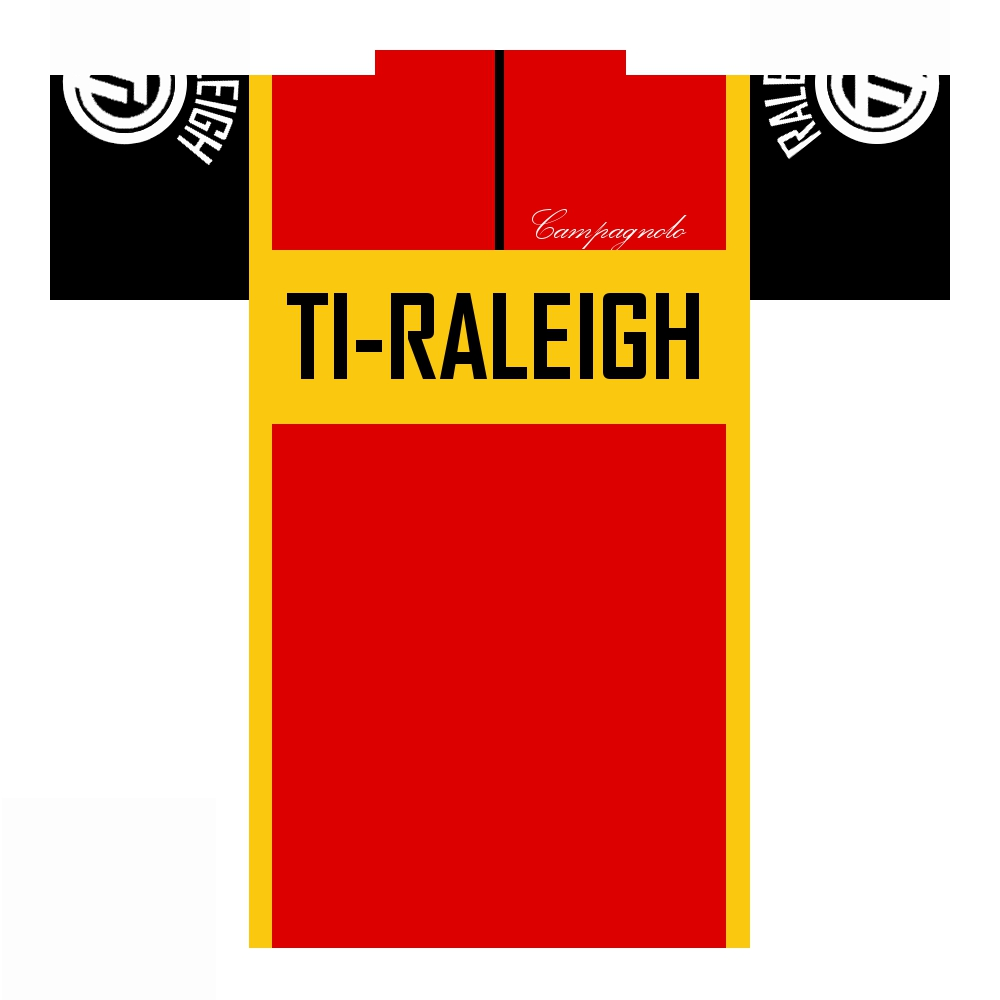
TI–Raleigh jersey
Jersey

De Posttrein 1982 Romandy Tour Ruzie in het peloton 1982 Paris-Roubaix

TI–Raleigh was a Dutch professional track cycling and road bicycle racing team between 1972 and 1983. In that decade the team won over 900 races. The team was created and led by Peter Post. In his own cycling career, his nickname was the Six Days Emperor, being a track champion. He also won the 1964 fast edition of Paris–Roubaix. Post was pretty harsh on himself. He had no time to celebrate and was always looking ahead at the next race. That attitude might have been the key to the team's success.

The team was successful in classics and in stage races. Notable riders included Joop Zoetemelk, Jan Raas, Gerrie Knetemann, Hennie Kuiper, Urs Freuler, Henk Lubberding, René Pijnen, Johan van der Velde and Dietrich Thurau. The team was known for discipline; team time trials were a speciality. The frame-building was overseen by Jan le Grand at Raleigh's SBDU Ilkeston facility.

== Team Time Trials ==
TI–Raleigh was unbeatable in the team time trials of the 1978 to 1982 Tour de France. In those five years, they won eight Tour TTTs. Driving forces in those TTTs were Jan Raas and Gerrie Knetemann, who decided team tactics during the race. They gave directions and changed the order at will. In the last few kilometers before the finish, Raas began to shout and curse in order to wring out every last bit of energy. After the finish, the riders were exhausted, but it was also time to celebrate.

TI–Raleigh had changed its formation tactics, from the traditional double paceline to a single paceline. 1964 Olympic TTT champion Gerben Karstens came up with the idea, when they were faced with a 153 km (95 miles) long TTT in the 1978 Tour. In a single line formation, the riders get more time to recover. The duration of the pull is varied. Strong riders like time trial specialist Bert Oosterbosch should not increase the pace, but rather take longer turns. Stronger and weaker riders are mixed, which keeps a steadier pace. Knetemann could gently pick up the pace, without anyone noticing.

The team had disgust for team members that did not do their utmost to help the team. It was not a problem when one was the weakest link, in every team there are specialists for the mountain stages that won't be tough time trial riders. However, the team expected every rider to take their turns, until they could no longer keep up the pace. In that situation the team would take a last pull, and drop off the team. The only exception were the General Classement-riders that had to finish in the same time as the team.

When in 1978 Klaus-Peter Thaler could win the yellow jersey if he'd finish with the team, he refused to take his turns and kept last position, which slows the team down. After 30 km in the wheels, Knetemann and Lubberding were fed up with their selfish "team mate". They started to entice him to take over, and even deliberately gapped themselves, in order to shake him off. This didn't help and also slowed down the team. They were told to knock it off, and Thaler did get his career highlight: the yellow jersey.

The 1980 Tour de France had an early TTT. The prologue was the day before, and in the morning the riders had had a stage of 133 km (83 mi). Bert Pronk had jumped ahead, riding in the breakaway. That helped Jan Raas to win the stage. Pronk didn't recuperate fast, and like every TI–Raleigh rider who was not a TT specialist, or had a bad day, he did fear the TTT that afternoon. Pronk followed the team custom of pulling as long as he could, but he dropped off early in the 46 km (29 mi) long race. When your team is one of the last to start, there are not a lot of cars or teams behind you to pull yourself up to. TI–Raleigh won, but went so fast, that Pronk finished outside the time limit. The next TTT, Raas en Kneet decided to start slowly in order to not repeat the disaster, but they did not tell Zoetemelk or Post about it...

== Sponsorship ==
The team was sponsored by British cycling manufacturer Raleigh and Raleigh's holding company Tube Investments (TI). Raleigh's sponsoring goes back at least as far as 1893, when they had given Arthur Augustus Zimmerman two of their bicycles and advertised Zimmy riding them. Over the years, they've sponsored a whole range of cyclists and teams, based in Great Britain, the Netherlands, the United States of America, Switzerland, Canada and Argentina.

Subsponsors were

- Campagnolo, an Italian manufacturer of high-end bicycle components
- Creda, made cooking appliances and showers, was at the time a part of TI
- McGregor could be a sportswear brand
- Admiral Sports British sportswear manufacturer

== The end of the TI-Raleigh team ==
At the end of the 1983 season, the TI–Raleigh team split up because of tension between former world champion Jan Raas and team leader Peter Post, with seven cyclists following Post to the new Panasonic team and six cyclists joining Raas on the Kwantum team. Gerrie Knetemann (to Europ Decor) and Johan van der Velde (to Metauro) did not join the division. In the next nine years, the gap and the animosity grew, and it culminated into a breakaway standstill in the Tour de France of 1992. The backlash made perfectly clear that this could not go on. In the middle of the night, in the middle of a French forest, by shimmering torch lights, the men vowed to end the quarrels. The divorce was finally accepted and dealt with.

== Notable riders ==
- Joop Zoetemelk
- Jan Raas
- Peter Post
- Hennie Kuiper
- Cees Priem
- Johan van der Velde
- Roy Schuiten
- Gerben Karstens
- René Pijnen
- Dietrich Thurau
- Frank Hoste
- Peter Winnen
- Ludo Peeters
- Gerrie Knetemann
- Bert Oosterbosch
- Gordon Singleton 1982 track
- David Lloyd 1973 to 1975
- Sid Barras 1974
- Brian Jolly 1974

== Major wins ==
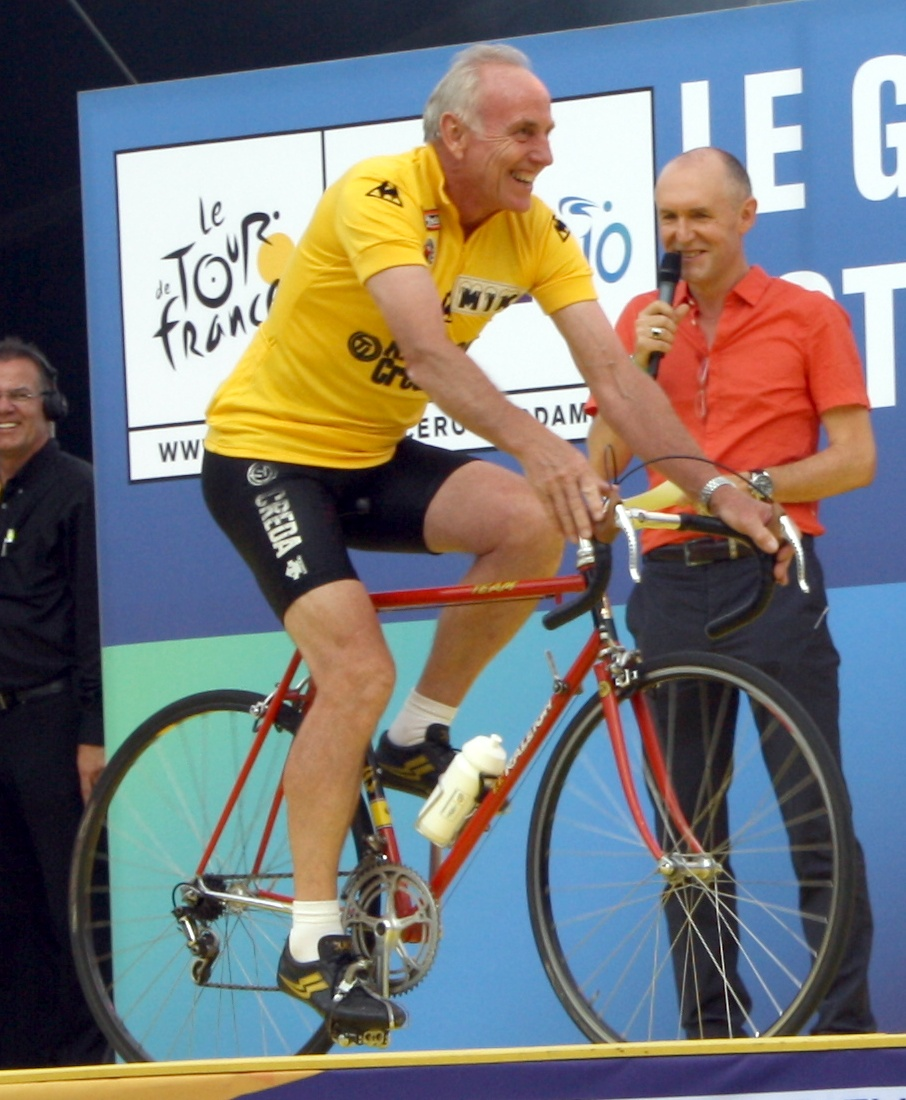
Joop Zoetemelk in full historical gear at the 2010 Tour de France team presentation in Rotterdam

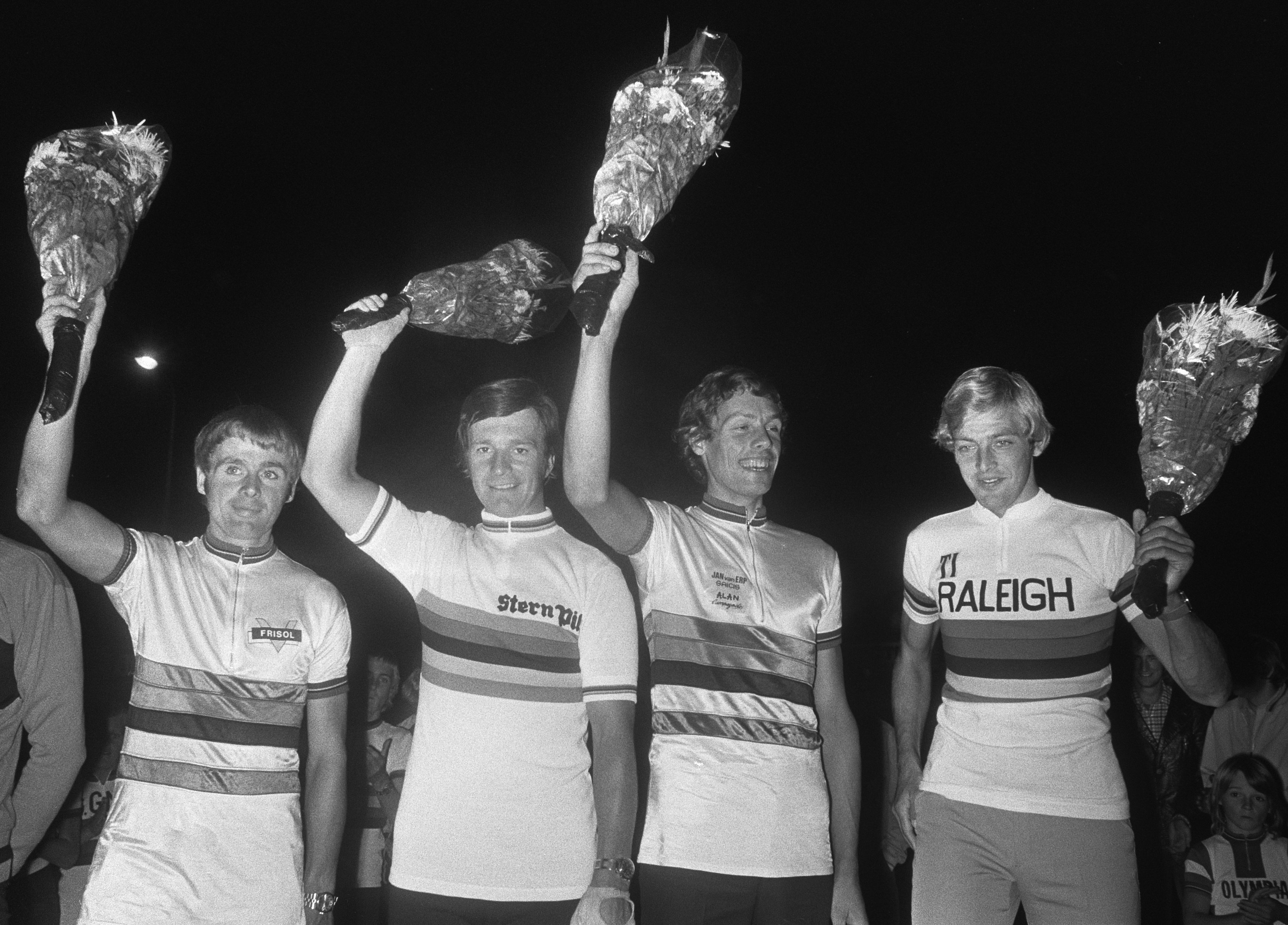
World Champions of 1975. Left to right: Hennie Kuiper (road race, TI–Raleigh 1976–1978), Dieter Kemper (track, motor paced), André Gevers (road race amateurs, TI–Raleigh 1978–79) and Roy Schuiten (track, individual pursuit, TI–Raleigh 1974–1975)

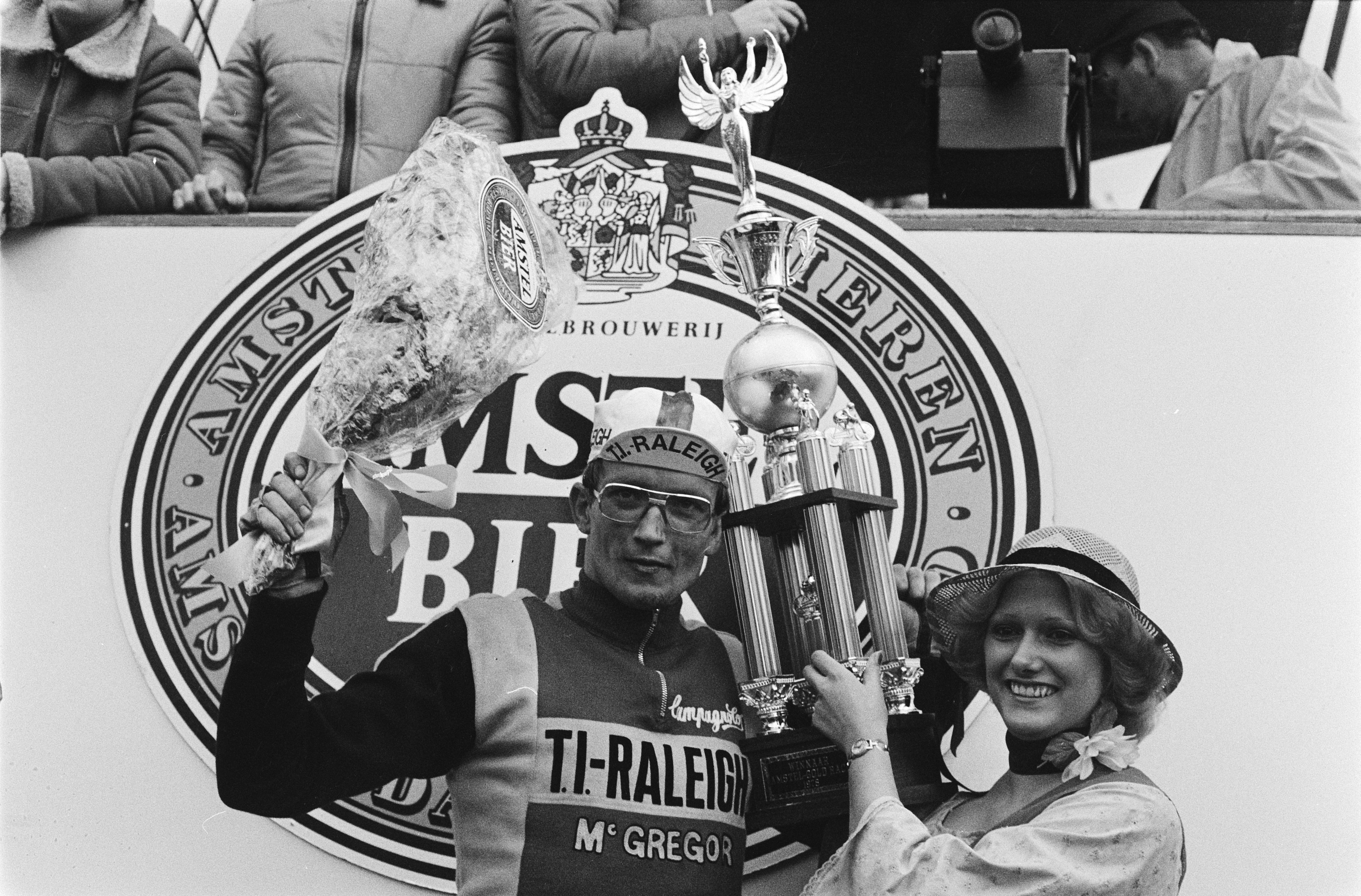
Jan has won the Amstel Gold Raas five times

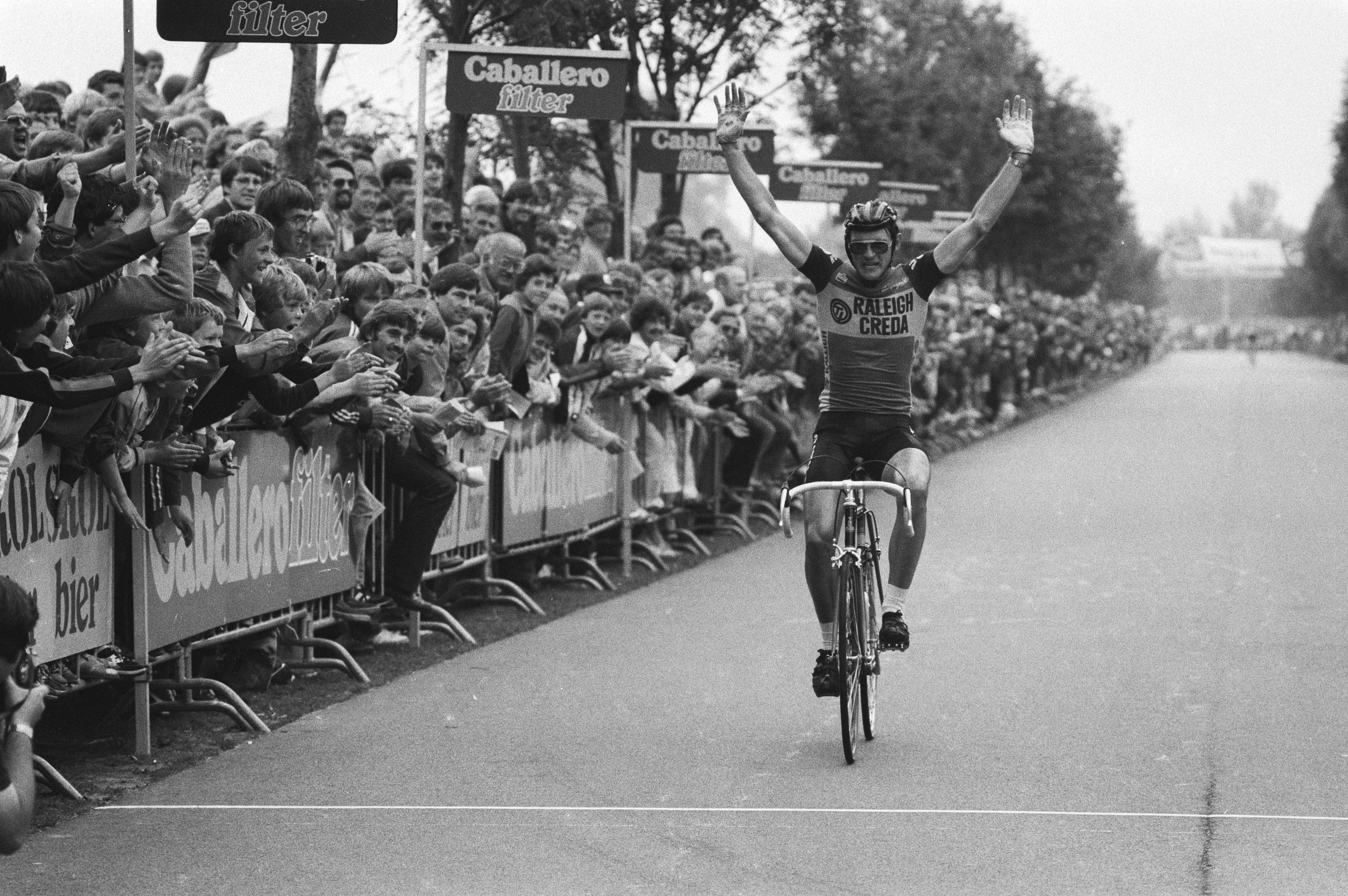
Gerrie Knetemann wins

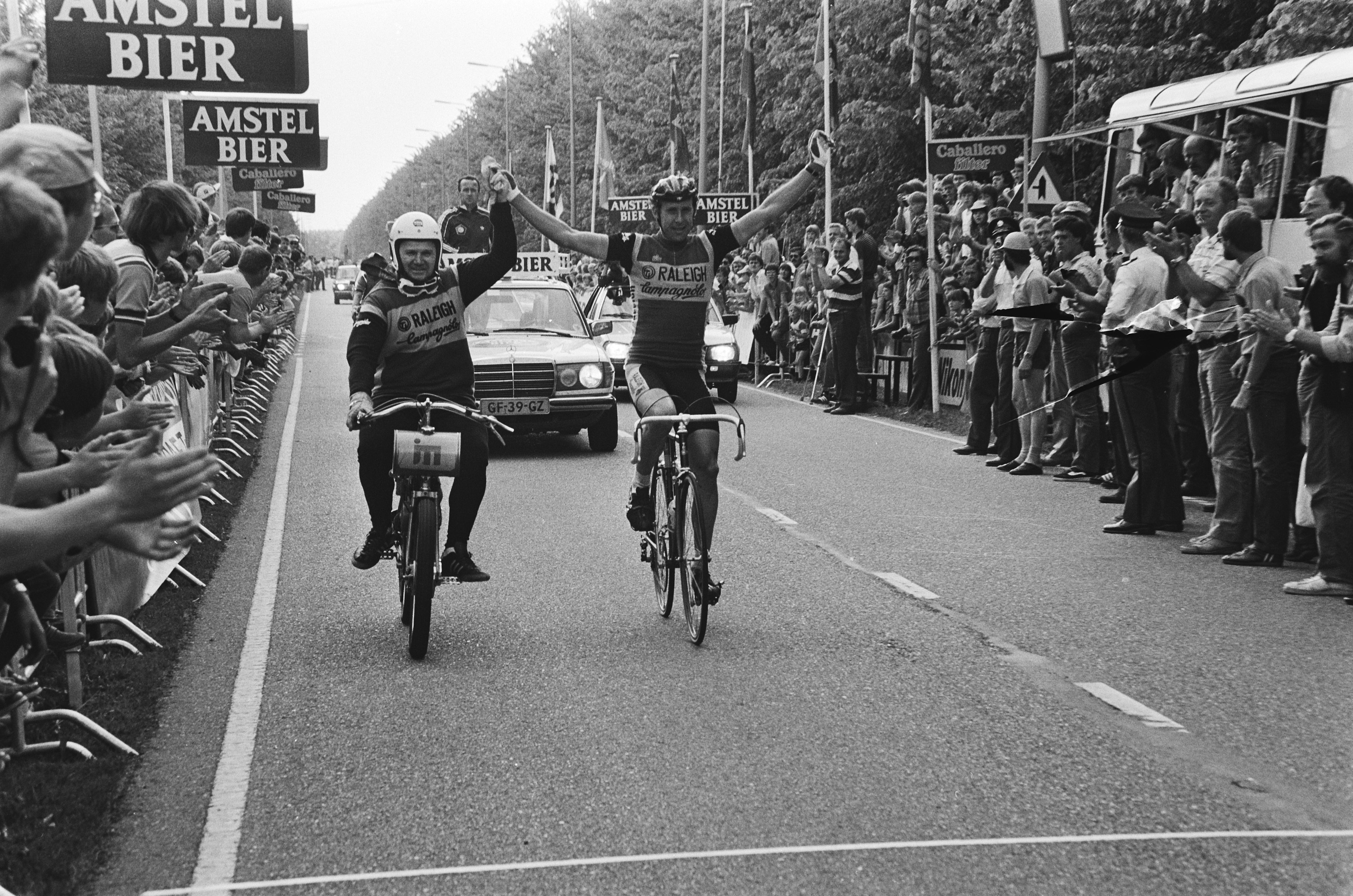
Gaston de Wachter and Ludo Peeters celebrate their win at the 307 km (191 mile) Zuiderzee Derny Tour.

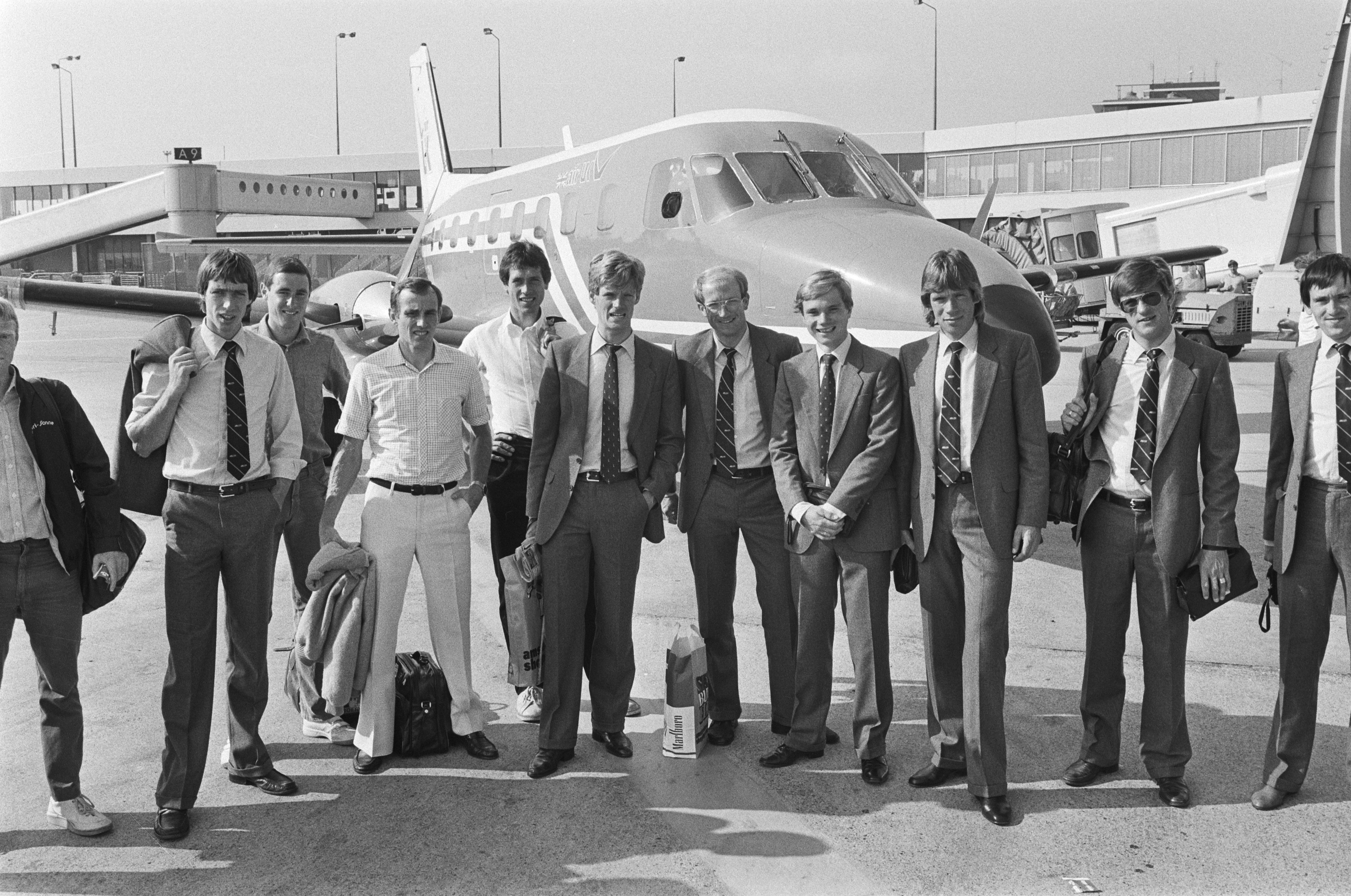
The Dutch team for the UCI World Championships of 1982. TI-Raleigh 1982 riders wear a suit. From left to right: (half of) Peter Winnen, Johan van der Velde, Theo de Rooij, Joop Zoetemelk, Adri van Houwelingen, Leo van Vliet, Jan Raas, Ad Wijnands, Henk Lubberding, Gerrie Knetemann and Gerard Veldscholten. Hennie Kuiper is not in the frame.

1974
Grand Prix des Nations, Roy Schuiten
World Champion, Individual Pursuit, Roy Schuiten
European championship Madison, René Pijnen
Six Days of Dortmund, René Pijnen
Six Days of Rotterdam, René Pijnen
Six Days of Berlin, René Pijnen with Roy Schuiten
1975
Rund um den Henninger-Turm, Roy Schuiten
World Champion, Individual Pursuit, Roy Schuiten
Grand Prix des Nations, Roy Schuiten
Six Days of Bremen, René Pijnen
Six Days of Frankfurt am Main, René Pijnen with Günther Haritz
Six Days of London, René Pijnen with Günther Haritz
Six Days of Munich, René Pijnen with Günther Haritz
Six Days of Münster, René Pijnen with Günther Haritz
Six Days of Zurich, Günther Haritz
1976
Tour de Suisse, Hennie Kuiper
Tour de France: 4 stages (Hennie Kuiper, Gerben Karstens (2), Team time trial)
European championship Madison, Réne Pijnen with Günther Haritz
Six Days of Bremen, René Pijnen with Günther Haritz
Six Days of Münster, René Pijnen with Günther Haritz
Six Days of Grenoble, Günther Haritz
1977
Four Days of Dunkirk, Gerrie Knetemann
Rund um den Henninger-Turm, Gerrie Knetemann
Tour de France: 8 stages (Dietrich Thurau (5), Gerrie Knetemann (2), Hennie Kuiper); 1st young rider classification (Dietrich Thurau), 1st team classification
Six Days of Herning, René Pijnen
Six Days of Cologne, René Pijnen with Günther Haritz
Six Days of London, René Pijnen
Six Days of Rotterdam, René Pijnen
Six Days of Grenoble, René Pijnen
1978
Amstel Gold Race, Jan Raas
Paris–Nice, Gerrie Knetemann
Paris–Brussels, Jan Raas
Paris–Tours, Jan Raas
Tour de Romandie, Johan van der Velde
Tour de Suisse, Paul Wellens
World Champion, Elite road, Gerrie Knetemann
Tour de France: 10 stages (Jan Raas (3), Gerrie Knetemann (2), Paul Wellens, Klaus-Peter Thaler, Hennie Kuiper, Henk Lubberding, team time trial); 7 yellow jerseys (Jan Raas (3), Gerrie Knetemann (2), Klaus-Peter Thaler (2)); 1st (Henk Lubberding) young rider classification
1979
Amstel Gold Race, Jan Raas
Tour of Flanders, Jan Raas
Tour de Suisse, Wilfried Wesemael
World Champion, Elite Road, Jan Raas
World Champion, Elite individual pursuit, Bert Oosterbosch
Tour de France: 6 stages (Gerrie Knetemann (2), team time trial (2), Jan Raas, Leo van Vliet); 1 yellow jersey (Gerrie Knetemann)
1980
Tour de France, Joop Zoetemelk
Amstel Gold Race, Jan Raas
Critérium du Dauphiné Libéré, Johan van der Velde
Tour de Luxembourg, Bert Oosterbosch
Gent–Wevelgem, Henk Lubberding
Tour of Belgium, Gerrie Knetemann
Tour de France: 11 stages (Jan Raas (3), Joop Zoetemelk (2), 2 x team time trial, Gerrie Knetemann, Bert Oosterbosch, Henk Lubberding, Cees Priem); 11 yellow jerseys (Joop Zoetemelk (10), Gerrie Knetemann); General classification: 1st (Joop Zoetemelk); 1st (Johan van der Velde) young rider classification
1981
Omloop Het Volk, Jan Raas
Gent–Wevelgem, Jan Raas
Paris–Tours, Jan Raas
Tour of Belgium, Ad Wijnands
Tour de France: 7 stages (team time trial (2), Ad Wijnands (2), Johan van der Velde (2), Urs Freuler); 4 yellow jerseys (Gerrie Knetemann)
1982
Amstel Gold Race, Jan Raas
Paris–Roubaix, Jan Raas
Gent–Wevelgem, Frank Hoste
Four Days of Dunkirk, Frank Hoste
Paris–Brussels, Jacques Hanegraaf
Rund um den Henninger-Turm, Ludo Peeters
Tour de France: 6 stages (Gerrie Knetemann (2), Jan Raas, Frank Hoste, Ludo Peeters, team time trial); 1 yellow jersey (Ludo Peeters)

World Track Championships, Leicester England, Gordon Singleton Gold in Keirin, Silver in Sprint
1983
Tour of Flanders, Jan Raas
Gent–Wevelgem, Leo van Vliet
Four Days of Dunkirk, Leo van Vliet
Rund um den Henninger-Turm, Ludo Peeters
Paris–Tours, Ludo Peeters
Championship of Zurich, Johan van der Velde
Tour de France: 4 stages (Bert Oosterbosch (2), Peter Winnen, Henk Lubberding); 1st team classification
