= List of teams and cyclists in the 1977 Vuelta a España =

For the 1977 Vuelta a España, the field consisted of 70 riders; 54 finished the race.

== By rider ==
Legend
No.	Starting number worn by the rider during the Vuelta
Pos.	Position in the general classification
Time	Deficit to the winner of the general classification
DNF	Denotes a rider who did not finish

No.	Name	Nationality	Team	Pos.	Time	Ref
1	José Pesarrodona	Spain	Kas–Campagnolo	8	+ 9' 32"	
2	Domingo Perurena	Spain	Kas–Campagnolo	4	+ 4' 45"	
3	Ismael Lejarreta	Spain	Kas–Campagnolo	16	+ 20' 57"	
4	José Antonio González	Spain	Kas–Campagnolo	10	+ 11' 18"	
5	Rafael Ladrón	Spain	Kas–Campagnolo	18	+ 27' 04"	
6	José Nazabal	Spain	Kas–Campagnolo	21	+ 42' 29"	
7	José Viejo	Spain	Kas–Campagnolo	5	+ 5' 14"	
8	Carlos Ocaña Crespo	Spain	Kas–Campagnolo	20	+ 42' 00"	
9	Andrés Oliva	Spain	Kas–Campagnolo	17	+ 22' 51"	
10	Eulalio García	Spain	Kas–Campagnolo	19	+ 34' 10"	
11	Luis Ocaña	Spain	Frisol–Gazelle	22	+ 43' 00"	
12	Fedor den Hertog	Netherlands	Frisol–Gazelle	DNF	—	
13	Cees Priem	Netherlands	Frisol–Gazelle	DNF	—	
14	Roger Loysch	Belgium	Frisol–Gazelle	46	+ 1h 45' 09"	
15	Geert Malfait	Belgium	Frisol–Gazelle	DNF	—	
16	Paul Wellens	Belgium	Frisol–Gazelle	28	+ 53' 52"	
17	André Romero	France	Frisol–Gazelle	29	+ 57' 09"	
18	Jean-Pierre Baert	Belgium	Frisol–Gazelle	26	+ 50' 24"	
19	Paul Clinckaert	Belgium	Frisol–Gazelle	DNF	—	
20	Benny Schepmans	Belgium	Frisol–Gazelle	38	+ 1h 10' 25"	
21	Luis Alberto Ordiales	Spain	Novostil-Gios	27	+ 50' 49"	
22	José Manuel García Rodríguez	Spain	Novostil-Gios	12	+ 13' 07"	
23	Custódio Mazuela Castillo	Spain	Novostil-Gios	31	+ 59' 31"	
24	Félix Suárez Colomo	Spain	Novostil-Gios	DNF	—	
25	José Luis Enfedaque Planillas	Spain	Novostil-Gios	DNF	—	
26	Jorge Fortia	Spain	Novostil-Gios	42	+ 1h 27' 58"	
27	Blas Domingo Llido	Spain	Novostil-Gios	DNF	—	
28	Fernando Cabrero	Spain	Novostil-Gios	DNF	—	
29	Ignacio Macho Ortega	Spain	Novostil-Gios	53	+ 2h 17' 58"	
30	Isidro Juárez	Spain	Novostil-Gios	49	+ 1h 56' 58"	
31	Ferdi Van Den Haute	Belgium	Ebo–Superia	44	+ 1h 37' 02"	
32	Ludo Loos	Belgium	Ebo–Superia	14	+ 16' 45"	
33	Dirk Ongenae	Belgium	Ebo–Superia	DNF	—	
34	Adri Schipper	Netherlands	Ebo–Superia	DNF	—	
35	Julien Stevens	Belgium	Ebo–Superia	52	+ 2h 12' 38"	
36	Hugo Van Gastel	Belgium	Ebo–Superia	40	+ 1h 11' 34"	
37	Alain Desaever	Belgium	Ebo–Superia	51	+ 2h 03' 47"	
38	Hendrik Vandenbrande	Netherlands	Ebo–Superia	37	+ 1h 07' 55"	
39	Frank Arijs	Belgium	Ebo–Superia	54	+ 2h 32' 02"	
40	Johan Van Uffel	Belgium	Ebo–Superia	DNF	—	
41	Joaquim Agostinho	Portugal	Teka	15	+ 18' 09"	
42	Miguel María Lasa	Spain	Teka	2	+ 2' 51"	
43	Francisco Elorriaga	Spain	Teka	24	+ 47' 33"	
44	Agustín Tamames	Spain	Teka	11	+ 11' 48"	
45	Fernando Mendes	Portugal	Teka	13	+ 14' 31"	
46	Klaus-Peter Thaler	West Germany	Teka	3	+ 3' 23"	
47	Pedro Torres	Spain	Teka	9	+ 10' 29"	
48	Andrés Gandarias	Spain	Teka	32	+ 1h 01' 22"	
49	Bernardo Alfonsel	Spain	Teka	39	+ 1h 10' 38"	
50	Carlos Melero García	Spain	Teka	23	+ 43' 54"	
51	Freddy Maertens	Belgium	Flandria-Latina	1	78h 54' 36"	
52	Michel Pollentier	Belgium	Flandria-Latina	6	+ 5' 35"	
53	Marc Demeyer	Belgium	Flandria-Latina	33	+ 1h 01' 27"	
54	Albert Van Vlierberghe	Belgium	Flandria-Latina	35	+ 1h 04' 36"	
55	Mariano Martínez	France	Flandria-Latina	41	+ 1h 14' 54"	
56	Walter Naegels	Belgium	Flandria-Latina	DNF	—	
57	Pol Verschuere	Belgium	Flandria-Latina	30	+ 57' 36"	
58	Jos Van De Poel	Belgium	Flandria-Latina	43	+ 1h 28' 38"	
59	Lieven Malfait	Belgium	Flandria-Latina	DNF	—	
60	Roger Verschaeve	Belgium	Flandria-Latina	48	+ 1h 55' 02"	
61	Giuseppe Perletto	Italy	Magniflex–Torpado	25	+ 50' 11"	
62	Wilmo Francioni	Italy	Magniflex–Torpado	36	+ 1h 07' 43"	
63	Sigfrido Fontanelli	Italy	Magniflex–Torpado	DNF	—	
64	Giancarlo Tartoni	Italy	Magniflex–Torpado	DNF	—	
65	Daniele Tinchella	Italy	Magniflex–Torpado	50	+ 1h 58' 40"	
66	Gary Clively	Australia	Magniflex–Torpado	7	+ 7' 06"	
67	Michael Neel	United States	Magniflex–Torpado	DNF	—	
68	Jean-Claude Fabbri	Italy	Magniflex–Torpado	45	+ 1h 41' 52"	
69	Thierry Bolle	Switzerland	Magniflex–Torpado	47	+ 1h 46' 59"	
70	Jesús Manzaneque	Spain	Magniflex–Torpado	34	+ 1h 04' 03"	
