= 1977 Vuelta a España, Prologue to Stage 10 =

Cycling race stages

The 1977 Vuelta a España was the 32nd edition of the Vuelta a España, one of cycling's Grand Tours. The Vuelta began in Dehesa de Campoamor, with a prologue individual time trial on 26 April, and Stage 10 occurred on 6 May with a stage to Barcelona. The race finished in Miranda de Ebro on 15 May.

== Prologue ==
26 April 1977 — Dehesa de Campoamor to Dehesa de Campoamor, 8 km (5.0 mi) (ITT)

Prologue result and general classification after Prologue

Rank	Rider	Team	Time
1	Freddy Maertens (BEL)	Flandria–Velda–Latina Assicurazioni	11' 12"
2	Michel Pollentier (BEL)	Flandria–Velda–Latina Assicurazioni	+ 14"
3	Miguel María Lasa (ESP)	Teka	+ 21"
4	Eulalio García (ESP)	Kas–Campagnolo	+ 23"
5	José Pesarrodona (ESP)	Kas–Campagnolo	+ 28"
6	Klaus-Peter Thaler (FRG)	Teka	+ 30"
7	Rafael Ladrón (ESP)	Kas–Campagnolo	+ 35"
8	José Manuel García Rodríguez (ESP)	Novostil-Gios	+ 36"
9	José Antonio González (ESP)	Kas–Campagnolo	+ 38"
10	Agustín Tamames (ESP)	Teka	+ 39"

== Stage 1 ==
27 April 1977 — Dehesa de Campoamor to La Manga, 115 km (71 mi)

Stage 1 result

Rank	Rider	Team	Time
1	Freddy Maertens (BEL)	Flandria–Velda–Latina Assicurazioni	3h 07' 54"
2	Klaus-Peter Thaler (FRG)	Teka	+ 6"
3	Benny Schepmans (BEL)	Frisol–Thirion–Gazelle	+ 10"
4	Geert Malfait (BEL)	Frisol–Thirion–Gazelle	s.t.
5	Mariano Martínez (FRA)	Flandria–Velda–Latina Assicurazioni	s.t.
6	Alain Desaever (BEL)	Ebo-Superia	s.t.
7	Cees Priem (NED)	Frisol–Thirion–Gazelle	s.t.
8	Johan Van Uffel (BEL)	Ebo-Superia	s.t.
9	Ferdi Van Den Haute (BEL)	Ebo-Superia	s.t.
10	José Viejo (ESP)	Kas–Campagnolo	s.t.

General classification after Stage 1

Rank	Rider	Team	Time
1	Freddy Maertens (BEL)	Flandria–Velda–Latina Assicurazioni	3h 19' 06"
2	Michel Pollentier (BEL)	Flandria–Velda–Latina Assicurazioni	+ 24"
3	Miguel María Lasa (ESP)	Teka	+ 31"
4	Eulalio García (ESP)	Kas–Campagnolo	+ 33"
5	Klaus-Peter Thaler (FRG)	Teka	+ 36"
6	José Pesarrodona (ESP)	Kas–Campagnolo	+ 38"
7	Rafael Ladrón (ESP)	Kas–Campagnolo	+ 45"
8	José Manuel García Rodríguez (ESP)	Novostil-Gios	+ 46"
9	José Antonio González (ESP)	Kas–Campagnolo	+ 48"
10	Joaquim Agostinho (POR)	Teka	+ 49"

== Stage 2 ==
28 April 1977 — La Manga to Murcia, 161 km (100 mi)

Stage 2 result

Rank	Rider	Team	Time
1	Freddy Maertens (BEL)	Flandria–Velda–Latina Assicurazioni	4h 36' 28"
2	Cees Priem (NED)	Frisol–Thirion–Gazelle	+ 4"
3	Dirk Ongenae (BEL)	Ebo-Superia	+ 10"
4	Michael Neel (USA)	Magniflex–Torpado	s.t.
5	Geert Malfait (BEL)	Frisol–Thirion–Gazelle	s.t.
6	Daniele Tinchella (ITA)	Magniflex–Torpado	s.t.
7	Luis Alberto Ordiales (ESP)	Novostil-Gios	s.t.
8	Adri Schipper (NED)	Ebo-Superia	s.t.
9	Francisco Elorriaga (ESP)	Teka	s.t.
10	José Pesarrodona (ESP)	Kas–Campagnolo	s.t.

General classification after Stage 2

Rank	Rider	Team	Time
1	Freddy Maertens (BEL)	Flandria–Velda–Latina Assicurazioni	7h 55' 31"
2	Michel Pollentier (BEL)	Flandria–Velda–Latina Assicurazioni	+ 37"
3	Miguel María Lasa (ESP)	Teka	+ 44"
4	Eulalio García (ESP)	Kas–Campagnolo	+ 46"
5	Klaus-Peter Thaler (FRG)	Teka	+ 49"
6	José Pesarrodona (ESP)	Kas–Campagnolo	+ 51"
7	Rafael Ladrón (ESP)	Kas–Campagnolo	+ 58"
8	José Manuel García Rodríguez (ESP)	Novostil-Gios	+ 59"
9	José Antonio González (ESP)	Kas–Campagnolo	+ 1' 01"
10	Joaquim Agostinho (POR)	Teka	+ 1' 02"

== Stage 3 ==
29 April 1977 — Murcia to Benidorm, 200 km (120 mi)

Stage 3 result

Rank	Rider	Team	Time
1	Fedor den Hertog (NED)	Frisol–Thirion–Gazelle	5h 51' 18"
2	José Viejo (ESP)	Kas–Campagnolo	+ 5"
3	Freddy Maertens (BEL)	Flandria–Velda–Latina Assicurazioni	+ 17"
4	Domingo Perurena (ESP)	Kas–Campagnolo	s.t.
5	Miguel María Lasa (ESP)	Teka	s.t.
6	Klaus-Peter Thaler (FRG)	Teka	s.t.
7	José Antonio González (ESP)	Kas–Campagnolo	s.t.
8	José Pesarrodona (ESP)	Kas–Campagnolo	s.t.
9	Fernando Mendes (POR)	Teka	s.t.
10	Agustín Tamames (ESP)	Teka	s.t.

General classification after Stage 3

Rank	Rider	Team	Time
1	Freddy Maertens (BEL)	Flandria–Velda–Latina Assicurazioni	13h 47' 36"
2	Miguel María Lasa (ESP)	Teka	+ 44"
3	Klaus-Peter Thaler (FRG)	Teka	+ 49"
4	José Pesarrodona (ESP)	Kas–Campagnolo	+ 51"
5	Fedor den Hertog (NED)	Frisol–Thirion–Gazelle	+ 58"
6	José Antonio González (ESP)	Kas–Campagnolo	+ 1' 01"
7	Agustín Tamames (ESP)	Teka	+ 1' 02"
8	Fernando Mendes (POR)	Teka	+ 1' 05"
9	Domingo Perurena (ESP)	Kas–Campagnolo	+ 1' 14"
10	José Viejo (ESP)	Kas–Campagnolo	+ 1' 33"

== Stage 4 ==
30 April 1977 — Benidorm to Benidorm, 8.3 km (5.2 mi) (ITT)

Stage 4 result

Rank	Rider	Team	Time
1	Michel Pollentier (BEL)	Flandria–Velda–Latina Assicurazioni	14' 35"
2	Miguel María Lasa (ESP)	Teka	+ 28"
3	José Viejo (ESP)	Kas–Campagnolo	+ 36"
4	José Nazabal (ESP)	Kas–Campagnolo	+ 39"
5	Luis Ocaña (ESP)	Frisol–Thirion–Gazelle	+ 52"
6	Gary Clively (AUS)	Magniflex–Torpado	+ 54"
7	Klaus-Peter Thaler (FRG)	Teka	+ 55"
8	Freddy Maertens (BEL)	Flandria–Velda–Latina Assicurazioni	+ 56"
9	José Antonio González (ESP)	Kas–Campagnolo	s.t.
10	Joaquim Agostinho (POR)	Teka	+ 59"

General classification after Stage 4

Rank	Rider	Team	Time
1	Freddy Maertens (BEL)	Flandria–Velda–Latina Assicurazioni	14h 02' 37"
2	Miguel María Lasa (ESP)	Teka	+ 17"
3	Klaus-Peter Thaler (FRG)	Teka	+ 48"
4	José Antonio González (ESP)	Kas–Campagnolo	+ 1' 01"
5	José Pesarrodona (ESP)	Kas–Campagnolo	+ 1' 02"
6	José Viejo (ESP)	Kas–Campagnolo	+ 1' 13"
7	Agustín Tamames (ESP)	Teka	+ 1' 16"
8	Fernando Mendes (POR)	Teka	+ 1' 32"
9	Domingo Perurena (ESP)	Kas–Campagnolo	s.t.
10	Fedor den Hertog (NED)	Frisol–Thirion–Gazelle	+ 2' 07"

== Stage 5 ==
1 May 1977 — Benidorm to El Saler, 159 km (99 mi)

Stage 5 result

Rank	Rider	Team	Time
1	Freddy Maertens (BEL)	Flandria–Velda–Latina Assicurazioni	4h 06' 40"
2	Dirk Ongenae (BEL)	Ebo-Superia	+ 6"
3	Miguel María Lasa (ESP)	Teka	+ 10"
4	Michael Neel (USA)	Magniflex–Torpado	s.t.
5	Cees Priem (NED)	Frisol–Thirion–Gazelle	s.t.
6	José Viejo (ESP)	Kas–Campagnolo	s.t.
7	Lieven Malfait (BEL)	Flandria–Velda–Latina Assicurazioni	s.t.
8	Gary Clively (AUS)	Magniflex–Torpado	s.t.
9	Domingo Perurena (ESP)	Kas–Campagnolo	s.t.
10	José Antonio González (ESP)	Kas–Campagnolo	s.t.

General classification after Stage 5

Rank	Rider	Team	Time
1	Freddy Maertens (BEL)	Flandria–Velda–Latina Assicurazioni	18h 09' 14"
2	Miguel María Lasa (ESP)	Teka	+ 30"
3	José Antonio González (ESP)	Kas–Campagnolo	+ 1' 04"
4	Klaus-Peter Thaler (FRG)	Teka	+ 1' 37"
5	Domingo Perurena (ESP)	Kas–Campagnolo	+ 1' 45"
6	José Pesarrodona (ESP)	Kas–Campagnolo	+ 1' 51"
7	José Viejo (ESP)	Kas–Campagnolo	+ 1' 56"
8	Agustín Tamames (ESP)	Teka	+ 2' 04"
9	Fedor den Hertog (NED)	Frisol–Thirion–Gazelle	+ 2' 20"
10	Fernando Mendes (POR)	Teka	+ 2' 21"

== Stage 6 ==
2 May 1977 — Valencia to Teruel, 170 km (110 mi)

Stage 6 result

Rank	Rider	Team	Time
1	Freddy Maertens (BEL)	Flandria–Velda–Latina Assicurazioni	4h 37' 01"
2	Klaus-Peter Thaler (FRG)	Teka	+ 6"
3	Miguel María Lasa (ESP)	Teka	+ 10"
4	Domingo Perurena (ESP)	Kas–Campagnolo	s.t.
5	Gary Clively (AUS)	Magniflex–Torpado	s.t.
6	José Viejo (ESP)	Kas–Campagnolo	s.t.
7	Adri Schipper (NED)	Ebo-Superia	s.t.
8	José Antonio González (ESP)	Kas–Campagnolo	s.t.
9	Michel Pollentier (BEL)	Flandria–Velda–Latina Assicurazioni	s.t.
10	Pol Verschuere (BEL)	Flandria–Velda–Latina Assicurazioni	+ 2' 01"

== Stage 7 ==
3 May 1977 — Teruel to Alcalà de Xivert, 204 km (127 mi)

Stage 7 result

Rank	Rider	Team	Time
1	Freddy Maertens (BEL)	Flandria–Velda–Latina Assicurazioni	5h 38' 45"
2	Adri Schipper (NED)	Ebo-Superia	+ 6"
3	Klaus-Peter Thaler (FRG)	Teka	+ 10"
4	Michel Pollentier (BEL)	Flandria–Velda–Latina Assicurazioni	s.t.
5	José Viejo (ESP)	Kas–Campagnolo	s.t.
6	José Antonio González (ESP)	Kas–Campagnolo	s.t.
7	Miguel María Lasa (ESP)	Teka	s.t.
8	Ludo Loos (BEL)	Ebo-Superia	s.t.
9	Domingo Perurena (ESP)	Kas–Campagnolo	s.t.
10	Gary Clively (AUS)	Magniflex–Torpado	s.t.

General classification after Stage 7

Rank	Rider	Team	Time
1	Freddy Maertens (BEL)	Flandria–Velda–Latina Assicurazioni	28h 25' 00"
2	Miguel María Lasa (ESP)	Teka	+ 50"
3	José Antonio González (ESP)	Kas–Campagnolo	+ 1' 34"
4	Klaus-Peter Thaler (FRG)	Teka	+ 1' 53"
5	Domingo Perurena (ESP)	Kas–Campagnolo	+ 2' 05"
6	José Viejo (ESP)	Kas–Campagnolo	+ 2' 13"
7	Michel Pollentier (BEL)	Flandria–Velda–Latina Assicurazioni	+ 4' 11"
8	Gary Clively (AUS)	Magniflex–Torpado	+ 5' 01"
9	José Pesarrodona (ESP)	Kas–Campagnolo	+ 5' 03"
10	Agustín Tamames (ESP)	Teka	+ 7' 48"

== Stage 8 ==
4 May 1977 — Alcalà de Xivert to Tortosa, 141 km (88 mi)

Stage 8 result

Rank	Rider	Team	Time
1	Freddy Maertens (BEL)	Flandria–Velda–Latina Assicurazioni	4h 13' 29"
2	Marc Demeyer (BEL)	Flandria–Velda–Latina Assicurazioni	+ 6"
3	Cees Priem (NED)	Frisol–Thirion–Gazelle	+ 10"
4	Benny Schepmans (BEL)	Frisol–Thirion–Gazelle	s.t.
5	Geert Malfait (BEL)	Frisol–Thirion–Gazelle	s.t.
6	Dirk Ongenae (BEL)	Ebo-Superia	s.t.
7	Frank Arijs (BEL)	Ebo-Superia	s.t.
8	Adri Schipper (NED)	Ebo-Superia	s.t.
9	Ferdi Van Den Haute (BEL)	Ebo-Superia	s.t.
10	Daniele Tinchella (ITA)	Magniflex–Torpado	s.t.

General classification after Stage 8

Rank	Rider	Team	Time
1	Freddy Maertens (BEL)	Flandria–Velda–Latina Assicurazioni	32h 38' 01"
2	Miguel María Lasa (ESP)	Teka	+ 1' 00"
3	José Antonio González (ESP)	Kas–Campagnolo	+ 1' 44"
4	Klaus-Peter Thaler (FRG)	Teka	+ 2' 03"
5	Domingo Perurena (ESP)	Kas–Campagnolo	+ 2' 15"
6	José Viejo (ESP)	Kas–Campagnolo	+ 2' 23"
7	Michel Pollentier (BEL)	Flandria–Velda–Latina Assicurazioni	+ 4' 21"
8	Gary Clively (AUS)	Magniflex–Torpado	+ 5' 11"
9	José Pesarrodona (ESP)	Kas–Campagnolo	+ 5' 13"
10	Agustín Tamames (ESP)	Teka	+ 7' 58"

== Stage 9 ==
5 May 1977 — Tortosa to Salou, 144 km (89 mi)

Stage 9 result

Rank	Rider	Team	Time
1	Freddy Maertens (BEL)	Flandria–Velda–Latina Assicurazioni	3h 41' 06"
2	Klaus-Peter Thaler (FRG)	Teka	+ 6"
3	Gary Clively (AUS)	Magniflex–Torpado	+ 10"
4	Miguel María Lasa (ESP)	Teka	s.t.
5	Agustín Tamames (ESP)	Teka	s.t.
6	Domingo Perurena (ESP)	Kas–Campagnolo	s.t.
7	Pedro Torres (ESP)	Teka	s.t.
8	José Manuel García Rodríguez (ESP)	Novostil-Gios	s.t.
9	José Antonio González (ESP)	Kas–Campagnolo	s.t.
10	Ludo Loos (BEL)	Ebo-Superia	s.t.

General classification after Stage 9

Rank	Rider	Team	Time
1	Freddy Maertens (BEL)	Flandria–Velda–Latina Assicurazioni	36h 19' 25"
2	Miguel María Lasa (ESP)	Teka	+ 1' 10"
3	José Antonio González (ESP)	Kas–Campagnolo	+ 1' 54"
4	Klaus-Peter Thaler (FRG)	Teka	+ 2' 09"
5	Domingo Perurena (ESP)	Kas–Campagnolo	+ 2' 25"
6	José Viejo (ESP)	Kas–Campagnolo	+ 3' 40"
7	Michel Pollentier (BEL)	Flandria–Velda–Latina Assicurazioni	+ 4' 31"
8	Gary Clively (AUS)	Magniflex–Torpado	+ 5' 21"
9	José Pesarrodona (ESP)	Kas–Campagnolo	+ 6' 40"
10	Agustín Tamames (ESP)	Teka	+ 8' 08"

== Stage 10 ==
6 May 1977 — Salou to Barcelona, 144 km (89 mi)

Stage 10 result

Rank	Rider	Team	Time
1	Cees Priem (NED)	Frisol–Thirion–Gazelle	4h 36' 48"
2	Freddy Maertens (BEL)	Flandria–Velda–Latina Assicurazioni	+ 6"
3	Geert Malfait (BEL)	Frisol–Thirion–Gazelle	+ 10"
4	Francisco Elorriaga (ESP)	Teka	s.t.
5	Benny Schepmans (BEL)	Frisol–Thirion–Gazelle	s.t.
6	Dirk Ongenae (BEL)	Ebo-Superia	s.t.
7	Adri Schipper (NED)	Ebo-Superia	s.t.
8	Jean-Pierre Baert (BEL)	Frisol–Thirion–Gazelle	s.t.
9	Daniele Tinchella (ITA)	Magniflex–Torpado	s.t.
10	Jordi Fortià Martí (ESP)	Novostil-Gios	s.t.

General classification after Stage 10

Rank	Rider	Team	Time
1	Freddy Maertens (BEL)	Flandria–Velda–Latina Assicurazioni	40h 56' 19"
2	Miguel María Lasa (ESP)	Teka	+ 1' 14"
3	Klaus-Peter Thaler (FRG)	Teka	+ 2' 15"
4	Domingo Perurena (ESP)	Kas–Campagnolo	+ 2' 21"
5	José Antonio González (ESP)	Kas–Campagnolo	+ 3' 32"
6	José Viejo (ESP)	Kas–Campagnolo	+ 3' 44"
7	Michel Pollentier (BEL)	Flandria–Velda–Latina Assicurazioni	+ 4' 35"
8	Gary Clively (AUS)	Magniflex–Torpado	+ 5' 25"
9	José Pesarrodona (ESP)	Kas–Campagnolo	+ 6' 34"
10	Agustín Tamames (ESP)	Teka	+ 8' 12"
