= 1977 Vuelta a España, Stage 11a to Stage 19 =

Cycling race stages

The 1977 Vuelta a España was the 32nd edition of the Vuelta a España, one of cycling's Grand Tours. The Vuelta began in Dehesa de Campoamor, with a prologue individual time trial on 26 April, and Stage 11a occurred on 7 May with a stage from Barcelona. The race finished in Miranda de Ebro on 15 May.

== Stage 11a ==
7 May 1977 — Barcelona to Barcelona, 3.8 km (2.4 mi) (ITT)

Stage 11a result

Rank	Rider	Team	Time
1	Freddy Maertens (BEL)	Flandria–Velda–Latina Assicurazioni	4' 43"
2	Michel Pollentier (BEL)	Flandria–Velda–Latina Assicurazioni	+ 13"
3	Francisco Elorriaga (ESP)	Teka	+ 18"
4	Klaus-Peter Thaler (FRG)	Teka	+ 19"
5	Eulalio García (ESP)	Kas–Campagnolo	+ 21"
6	Gary Clively (AUS)	Magniflex–Torpado	+ 22"
7	Joaquim Agostinho (POR)	Teka	s.t.
8	Agustín Tamames (ESP)	Teka	+ 24"
9	José Manuel García Rodríguez (ESP)	Novostil-Gios	+ 25"
10	Pedro Torres (ESP)	Teka	s.t.

== Stage 11b ==
7 May 1977 — Barcelona to Barcelona, 45 km (28 mi)

Stage 11b result

Rank	Rider	Team	Time
1	Freddy Maertens (BEL)	Flandria–Velda–Latina Assicurazioni	1h 06' 10"
2	Benny Schepmans (BEL)	Frisol–Thirion–Gazelle	+ 3"
3	Dirk Ongenae (BEL)	Ebo-Superia	+ 5"
4	Geert Malfait (BEL)	Frisol–Thirion–Gazelle	s.t.
5	Cees Priem (NED)	Frisol–Thirion–Gazelle	s.t.
6	Francisco Elorriaga (ESP)	Teka	s.t.
7	Klaus-Peter Thaler (FRG)	Teka	s.t.
8	Gary Clively (AUS)	Magniflex–Torpado	s.t.
9	José Pesarrodona (ESP)	Kas–Campagnolo	s.t.
10	Hugo Van Gastel (BEL)	Ebo-Superia	s.t.

General classification after Stage 11b

Rank	Rider	Team	Time
1	Freddy Maertens (BEL)	Flandria–Velda–Latina Assicurazioni	42h 07' 13"
2	Miguel María Lasa (ESP)	Teka	+ 1' 47"
3	Klaus-Peter Thaler (FRG)	Teka	+ 2' 37"
4	Domingo Perurena (ESP)	Kas–Campagnolo	+ 3' 11"
5	José Antonio González (ESP)	Kas–Campagnolo	+ 4' 07"
6	José Viejo (ESP)	Kas–Campagnolo	+ 4' 18"
7	Michel Pollentier (BEL)	Flandria–Velda–Latina Assicurazioni	+ 4' 53"
8	Gary Clively (AUS)	Magniflex–Torpado	+ 5' 52"
9	José Pesarrodona (ESP)	Kas–Campagnolo	+ 7' 05"
10	Agustín Tamames (ESP)	Teka	+ 8' 41"

== Stage 12 ==
8 May 1977 — Barcelona to La Tossa de Montbui (Santa Margarida de Montbui), 198 km (123 mi)

Stage 12 result

Rank	Rider	Team	Time
1	Giuseppe Perletto (ITA)	Magniflex–Torpado	5h 33' 24"
2	Joaquim Agostinho (POR)	Teka	+ 6"
3	Luis Ocaña (ESP)	Frisol–Thirion–Gazelle	+ 1' 12"
4	José Viejo (ESP)	Kas–Campagnolo	+ 2' 04"
5	Miguel María Lasa (ESP)	Teka	s.t.
6	Freddy Maertens (BEL)	Flandria–Velda–Latina Assicurazioni	s.t.
7	Carlos Ocaña Crespo (ESP)	Kas–Campagnolo	s.t.
8	Michel Pollentier (BEL)	Flandria–Velda–Latina Assicurazioni	s.t.
9	Klaus-Peter Thaler (FRG)	Teka	s.t.
10	Domingo Perurena (ESP)	Kas–Campagnolo	s.t.

General classification after Stage 12

Rank	Rider	Team	Time
1	Freddy Maertens (BEL)	Flandria–Velda–Latina Assicurazioni	47h 42' 41"
2	Miguel María Lasa (ESP)	Teka	+ 1' 47"
3	Klaus-Peter Thaler (FRG)	Teka	+ 2' 37"
4	Domingo Perurena (ESP)	Kas–Campagnolo	+ 3' 11"
5	José Viejo (ESP)	Kas–Campagnolo	+ 4' 18"
6	Michel Pollentier (BEL)	Flandria–Velda–Latina Assicurazioni	+ 4' 53"
7	Gary Clively (AUS)	Magniflex–Torpado	+ 5' 52"
8	José Pesarrodona (ESP)	Kas–Campagnolo	+ 7' 14"
9	José Antonio González (ESP)	Kas–Campagnolo	+ 7' 45"
10	Agustín Tamames (ESP)	Teka	+ 8' 50"

== Stage 13 ==
9 May 1977 — Igualada to La Seu d'Urgell, 135 km (84 mi)

Stage 13 result

Rank	Rider	Team	Time
1	Freddy Maertens (BEL)	Flandria–Velda–Latina Assicurazioni	3h 51' 42"
2	Marc Demeyer (BEL)	Flandria–Velda–Latina Assicurazioni	+ 6"
3	Benny Schepmans (BEL)	Frisol–Thirion–Gazelle	+ 10"
4	Daniele Tinchella (ITA)	Magniflex–Torpado	s.t.
5	Klaus-Peter Thaler (FRG)	Teka	s.t.
6	Geert Malfait (BEL)	Frisol–Thirion–Gazelle	s.t.
7	Francisco Elorriaga (ESP)	Teka	s.t.
8	Jean-Pierre Baert (BEL)	Frisol–Thirion–Gazelle	s.t.
9	Dirk Ongenae (BEL)	Ebo-Superia	s.t.
10	José Viejo (ESP)	Kas–Campagnolo	s.t.

== Stage 14 ==
10 May 1977 — La Seu d'Urgell to Monzón, 200 km (120 mi)

Stage 14 result

Rank	Rider	Team	Time
1	Carlos Melero García (ESP)	Teka	6h 11' 10"
2	Ismael Lejarreta (ESP)	Kas–Campagnolo	+ 6"
3	Giancarlo Tartoni (ITA)	Magniflex–Torpado	+ 4' 10"
4	Roger Loysch (BEL)	Frisol–Thirion–Gazelle	+ 4' 12"
5	Wilmo Francioni (ITA)	Magniflex–Torpado	+ 4' 34"
6	Benny Schepmans (BEL)	Frisol–Thirion–Gazelle	+ 4' 35"
7	Daniele Tinchella (ITA)	Magniflex–Torpado	s.t.
8	Hendrik Vandenbrande (NED)	Ebo-Superia	s.t.
9	Alain Desaever (BEL)	Ebo-Superia	s.t.
10	Hugo Van Gastel (BEL)	Ebo-Superia	s.t.

General classification after Stage 14

Rank	Rider	Team	Time
1	Freddy Maertens (BEL)	Flandria–Velda–Latina Assicurazioni	57h 50' 08"
2	Miguel María Lasa (ESP)	Teka	+ 1' 57"
3	Klaus-Peter Thaler (FRG)	Teka	+ 2' 47"
4	Domingo Perurena (ESP)	Kas–Campagnolo	+ 3' 21"
5	José Viejo (ESP)	Kas–Campagnolo	+ 4' 36"
6	Michel Pollentier (BEL)	Flandria–Velda–Latina Assicurazioni	+ 5' 03"
7	Gary Clively (AUS)	Magniflex–Torpado	+ 6' 02"
8	José Pesarrodona (ESP)	Kas–Campagnolo	+ 7' 24"
9	José Antonio González (ESP)	Kas–Campagnolo	+ 7' 53"
10	Agustín Tamames (ESP)	Teka	+ 9' 00"

== Stage 15 ==
11 May 1977 — Monzón to Formigal, 166 km (103 mi)

Stage 15 result

Rank	Rider	Team	Time
1	Pedro Torres (ESP)	Teka	5h 16' 33"
2	José Viejo (ESP)	Kas–Campagnolo	+ 13"
3	Gary Clively (AUS)	Magniflex–Torpado	+ 21"
4	Michel Pollentier (BEL)	Flandria–Velda–Latina Assicurazioni	+ 22"
5	Freddy Maertens (BEL)	Flandria–Velda–Latina Assicurazioni	+ 28"
6	Joaquim Agostinho (POR)	Teka	s.t.
7	Andrés Oliva (ESP)	Kas–Campagnolo	+ 37"
8	Ludo Loos (BEL)	Ebo-Superia	+ 42"
9	Klaus-Peter Thaler (FRG)	Teka	+ 45"
10	Domingo Perurena (ESP)	Kas–Campagnolo	+ 46"

General classification after Stage 15

Rank	Rider	Team	Time
1	Freddy Maertens (BEL)	Flandria–Velda–Latina Assicurazioni	63h 07' 09"
2	Miguel María Lasa (ESP)	Teka	+ 2' 29"
3	Klaus-Peter Thaler (FRG)	Teka	+ 3' 04"
4	Domingo Perurena (ESP)	Kas–Campagnolo	+ 3' 39"
5	José Viejo (ESP)	Kas–Campagnolo	+ 4' 13"
6	Michel Pollentier (BEL)	Flandria–Velda–Latina Assicurazioni	+ 4' 57"
7	Gary Clively (AUS)	Magniflex–Torpado	+ 5' 55"
8	José Pesarrodona (ESP)	Kas–Campagnolo	+ 7' 56"
9	José Antonio González (ESP)	Kas–Campagnolo	+ 8' 59"
10	Agustín Tamames (ESP)	Teka	+ 9' 44"

== Stage 16 ==
12 May 1977 — Formigal to Cordovilla, 170 km (110 mi)

Stage 16 result

Rank	Rider	Team	Time
1	Freddy Maertens (BEL)	Flandria–Velda–Latina Assicurazioni	4h 47' 40"
2	Daniele Tinchella (ITA)	Magniflex–Torpado	+ 6"
3	Benny Schepmans (BEL)	Frisol–Thirion–Gazelle	+ 10"
4	Dirk Ongenae (BEL)	Ebo-Superia	s.t.
5	Domingo Perurena (ESP)	Kas–Campagnolo	s.t.
6	José Viejo (ESP)	Kas–Campagnolo	s.t.
7	Michel Pollentier (BEL)	Flandria–Velda–Latina Assicurazioni	s.t.
8	Marc Demeyer (BEL)	Flandria–Velda–Latina Assicurazioni	s.t.
9	José Antonio González (ESP)	Kas–Campagnolo	s.t.
10	José Manuel García Rodríguez (ESP)	Novostil-Gios	s.t.

General classification after Stage 16

Rank	Rider	Team	Time
1	Freddy Maertens (BEL)	Flandria–Velda–Latina Assicurazioni	67h 54' 49"
2	Miguel María Lasa (ESP)	Teka	+ 2' 39"
3	Klaus-Peter Thaler (FRG)	Teka	+ 3' 40"
4	Domingo Perurena (ESP)	Kas–Campagnolo	+ 3' 49"
5	José Viejo (ESP)	Kas–Campagnolo	+ 4' 23"
6	Michel Pollentier (BEL)	Flandria–Velda–Latina Assicurazioni	+ 5' 07"
7	Gary Clively (AUS)	Magniflex–Torpado	+ 6' 05"
8	José Pesarrodona (ESP)	Kas–Campagnolo	+ 8' 06"
9	José Antonio González (ESP)	Kas–Campagnolo	+ 9' 09"
10	Pedro Torres (ESP)	Teka	+ 10' 04"

== Stage 17 ==
13 May 1977 — Cordovilla to Bilbao, 183 km (114 mi)

Stage 17 result

Rank	Rider	Team	Time
1	Luis Alberto Ordiales (ESP)	Novostil-Gios	4h 54' 16"
2	Klaus-Peter Thaler (FRG)	Teka	+ 5' 09"
3	Freddy Maertens (BEL)	Flandria–Velda–Latina Assicurazioni	+ 5' 13"
4	Domingo Perurena (ESP)	Kas–Campagnolo	s.t.
5	Daniele Tinchella (ITA)	Magniflex–Torpado	s.t.
6	Benny Schepmans (BEL)	Frisol–Thirion–Gazelle	s.t.
7	Marc Demeyer (BEL)	Flandria–Velda–Latina Assicurazioni	s.t.
8	Francisco Elorriaga (ESP)	Teka	s.t.
9	Dirk Ongenae (BEL)	Ebo-Superia	s.t.
10	Jean-Pierre Baert (BEL)	Frisol–Thirion–Gazelle	s.t.

General classification after Stage 17

Rank	Rider	Team	Time
1	Freddy Maertens (BEL)	Flandria–Velda–Latina Assicurazioni	72h 54' 18"
2	Miguel María Lasa (ESP)	Teka	+ 2' 39"
3	Klaus-Peter Thaler (FRG)	Teka	+ 3' 10"
4	Domingo Perurena (ESP)	Kas–Campagnolo	+ 3' 49"
5	José Viejo (ESP)	Kas–Campagnolo	+ 4' 23"
6	Michel Pollentier (BEL)	Flandria–Velda–Latina Assicurazioni	+ 5' 07"
7	Gary Clively (AUS)	Magniflex–Torpado	+ 6' 05"
8	José Pesarrodona (ESP)	Kas–Campagnolo	+ 8' 07"
9	José Antonio González (ESP)	Kas–Campagnolo	+ 9' 09"
10	Pedro Torres (ESP)	Teka	+ 10' 04"

== Stage 18 ==
14 May 1977 — Bilbao to Urkiola, 126 km (78 mi)

Stage 18 result

Rank	Rider	Team	Time
1	José Nazabal (ESP)	Kas–Campagnolo	3h 35' 05"
2	Giuseppe Perletto (ITA)	Magniflex–Torpado	+ 6"
3	Domingo Perurena (ESP)	Kas–Campagnolo	+ 25"
4	Freddy Maertens (BEL)	Flandria–Velda–Latina Assicurazioni	s.t.
5	Klaus-Peter Thaler (FRG)	Teka	+ 27"
6	José Viejo (ESP)	Kas–Campagnolo	+ 28"
7	Gary Clively (AUS)	Magniflex–Torpado	+ 30"
8	Miguel María Lasa (ESP)	Teka	s.t.
9	Ismael Lejarreta (ESP)	Kas–Campagnolo	+ 39"
10	Pedro Torres (ESP)	Teka	s.t.

General classification after Stage 18

Rank	Rider	Team	Time
1	Freddy Maertens (BEL)	Flandria–Velda–Latina Assicurazioni	76h 29' 09"
2	Miguel María Lasa (ESP)	Teka	+ 3' 23"
3	Klaus-Peter Thaler (FRG)	Teka	+ 3' 51"
4	Domingo Perurena (ESP)	Kas–Campagnolo	+ 4' 28"
5	José Viejo (ESP)	Kas–Campagnolo	+ 5' 05"
6	Michel Pollentier (BEL)	Flandria–Velda–Latina Assicurazioni	+ 6' 04"
7	Gary Clively (AUS)	Magniflex–Torpado	+ 6' 51"
8	José Pesarrodona (ESP)	Kas–Campagnolo	+ 9' 18"
9	Pedro Torres (ESP)	Teka	+ 10' 57"
10	José Antonio González (ESP)	Kas–Campagnolo	+ 11' 01"

== Stage 19 ==
15 May 1977 — Durango to Miranda de Ebro, 104 km (65 mi)

Stage 19 result

Rank	Rider	Team	Time
1	Freddy Maertens (BEL)	Flandria–Velda–Latina Assicurazioni	2h 24' 49"
2	Miguel María Lasa (ESP)	Teka	+ 6"
3	Klaus-Peter Thaler (FRG)	Teka	+ 10"
4	Marc Demeyer (BEL)	Flandria–Velda–Latina Assicurazioni	s.t.
5	Michel Pollentier (BEL)	Flandria–Velda–Latina Assicurazioni	s.t.
6	Pedro Torres (ESP)	Teka	s.t.
7	Pol Verschuere (BEL)	Flandria–Velda–Latina Assicurazioni	+ 22"
8	Daniele Tinchella (ITA)	Magniflex–Torpado	+ 55"
9	Francisco Elorriaga (ESP)	Teka	s.t.
10	Benny Schepmans (BEL)	Frisol–Thirion–Gazelle	s.t.

General classification after Stage 19

Rank	Rider	Team	Time
1	Freddy Maertens (BEL)	Flandria–Velda–Latina Assicurazioni	78h 54' 36"
2	Miguel María Lasa (ESP)	Teka	+ 2' 51"
3	Klaus-Peter Thaler (FRG)	Teka	+ 3' 23"
4	Domingo Perurena (ESP)	Kas–Campagnolo	+ 4' 45"
5	José Viejo (ESP)	Kas–Campagnolo	+ 5' 14"
6	Michel Pollentier (BEL)	Flandria–Velda–Latina Assicurazioni	+ 5' 35"
7	Gary Clively (AUS)	Magniflex–Torpado	+ 7' 06"
8	José Pesarrodona (ESP)	Kas–Campagnolo	+ 9' 32"
9	Pedro Torres (ESP)	Teka	+ 10' 29"
10	José Antonio González (ESP)	Kas–Campagnolo	+ 11' 18"
