= List of teams and cyclists in the 1976 Vuelta a España =

For the 1976 Vuelta a España, the field consisted of 100 riders; 49 finished the race.

== By rider ==
Legend
No.	Starting number worn by the rider during the Vuelta
Pos.	Position in the general classification
Time	Deficit to the winner of the general classification
DNF	Denotes a rider who did not finish

No.	Name	Nationality	Team	Pos.	Time	Ref
1	Agustín Tamames	Spain	Super Ser	DNF	—	
2	Josef Fuchs	Switzerland	Super Ser	8	+ 3' 45"	
3	Luis Ocaña	Spain	Super Ser	2	+ 1' 03"	
4	Roger Rosiers	Belgium	Super Ser	39	+ 1h 53' 47"	
5	Roland Berland	France	Super Ser	37	+ 1h 37' 37"	
6	Pedro Torres	Spain	Super Ser	9	+ 4' 43"	
7	Jesús Manzaneque	Spain	Super Ser	25	+ 37' 27"	
8	Francisco Elorriaga	Spain	Super Ser	26	+ 47' 49"	
9	Santiago Lazcano	Spain	Super Ser	22	+ 29' 10"	
10	Luis Balagué	Spain	Super Ser	36	+ 1h 35' 11"	
11	Hennie Kuiper	Netherlands	TI–Raleigh	6	+ 2' 00"	
12	Dietrich Thurau	West Germany	TI–Raleigh	4	+ 1' 44"	
13	Gerrie Knetemann	Netherlands	TI–Raleigh	DNF	—	
14	Gerben Karstens	Netherlands	TI–Raleigh	DNF	—	
15	Jan van Katwijk	Netherlands	TI–Raleigh	DNF	—	
16	Aad Van Den Hoek	Netherlands	TI–Raleigh	DNF	—	
17	Hubert Pronk	Netherlands	TI–Raleigh	DNF	—	
18	Gunther Haritz	West Germany	TI–Raleigh	DNF	—	
19	José De Cauwer	Belgium	TI–Raleigh	DNF	—	
20	Co Hoogedoorn	Netherlands	TI–Raleigh	DNF	—	
21	Enrique Cima	Spain	Novostil–Transmallorca	19	+ 24' 05"	
22	José Manuel García Rodríguez	Spain	Novostil–Transmallorca	27	+ 49' 50"	
23	Jesús Lindez López	Spain	Novostil–Transmallorca	DNF	—	
24	Custódio Mazuela Castillo	Spain	Novostil–Transmallorca	DNF	—	
25	Ramón Medina Caballero	Spain	Novostil–Transmallorca	DNF	—	
26	Roque Moya	Spain	Novostil–Transmallorca	DNF	—	
27	Luis Alberto Ordiales	Spain	Novostil–Transmallorca	42	+ 2h 15' 12"	
28	Fernando Plaza Labiano	Spain	Novostil–Transmallorca	DNF	—	
29	Antonio Vallori	Spain	Novostil–Transmallorca	28	+ 53' 33"	
30	Manuel Antonio García	Spain	Novostil–Transmallorca	DNF	—	
31	Maurizio Bellet	Italy	Miko–Superia–de Gribaldy	DNF	—	
32	Georges Pintens	Belgium	Miko–Superia–de Gribaldy	DNF	—	
33	Roger Loysch	Belgium	Miko–Superia–de Gribaldy	DNF	—	
34	Herman Vrijders	Belgium	Miko–Superia–de Gribaldy	DNF	—	
35	Bernard Bourguignon	Belgium	Miko–Superia–de Gribaldy	DNF	—	
36	Jean-Pierre Baert	Belgium	Miko–Superia–de Gribaldy	18	+ 20' 00"	
37	Daniël De Schrooder	Belgium	Miko–Superia–de Gribaldy	DNF	—	
38	Paul Wellens	Belgium	Miko–Superia–de Gribaldy	33	+ 1h 29' 43"	
39	Jean-Luc Yansenne	Belgium	Miko–Superia–de Gribaldy	46	+ 2h 25' 16"	
40	Lucien Pratte	Belgium	Miko–Superia–de Gribaldy	DNF	—	
41	Domingo Perurena	Spain	Kas	17	+ 20' 00"	
42	Vicente López Carril	Spain	Kas	5	+ 1' 50"	
43	Enrique Martínez Heredia	Spain	Kas	12	+ 9' 19"	
44	Andrés Oliva	Spain	Kas	13	+ 9' 37"	
45	José Freitas Martins	Portugal	Kas	15	+ 10' 13"	
46	José Antonio González	Spain	Kas	10	+ 7' 18"	
47	José Pesarrodona	Spain	Kas	1	93h 19' 10"	
48	Juan Manuel Santisteban	Spain	Kas	31	+ 1h 18' 55"	
49	José Nazabal	Spain	Kas	3	+ 1' 41"	
50	Tomás Nistal	Spain	Kas	DNF	—	
51	Ferdi Van Den Haute	Belgium	Ebo–Cinzia	34	+ 1h 26' 41"	
52	Wilfried Reybrouck	Belgium	Ebo–Cinzia	DNF	—	
53	Johnny Vanderveken	Belgium	Ebo–Cinzia	DNF	—	
54	Julien Van Lint	Belgium	Ebo–Cinzia	49	+ 2h 46' 10"	
55	Jan Aling	Netherlands	Ebo–Cinzia	DNF	—	
56	Hugo Van Gastel	Belgium	Ebo–Cinzia	DNF	—	
57	Alain Desaever	Belgium	Ebo–Cinzia	DNF	—	
58	Ludo Loos	Belgium	Ebo–Cinzia	11	+ 7' 25"	
59	Marc Meernhout	Belgium	Ebo–Cinzia	DNF	—	
60	Eric Jacques	Belgium	Ebo–Cinzia	16	+ 12' 13"	
61	José Luis Abilleira	Spain	Teka	DNF	—	
62	Joaquim Agostinho	Portugal	Teka	7	+ 3' 16"	
63	Gonzalo Aja	Spain	Teka	14	+ 9' 54"	
64	Fernando Mendes Dos Reis	Portugal	Teka	20	+ 24' 41"	
65	Julián Andiano	Spain	Teka	23	+ 29' 22"	
66	Manuel Esparza	Spain	Teka	24	+ 29' 23"	
67	Andrés Gandarias	Spain	Teka	35	+ 1h 27' 39"	
68	Antonio Jiménez Luján	Spain	Teka	44	+ 2h 19' 34"	
69	Ventura Díaz	Spain	Teka	21	+ 29' 04"	
70	Antonio Menéndez	Spain	Teka	DNF	—	
71	Fedor den Hertog	Netherlands	Frisol	DNF	—	
72	Donald Allan	Australia	Frisol	DNF	—	
73	Theo Smit	Netherlands	Frisol	DNF	—	
74	Cees Priem	Netherlands	Frisol	32	+ 1h 20' 23"	
75	Gérard Tabak	Netherlands	Frisol	DNF	—	
76	Henk Prinsen	Netherlands	Frisol	38	+ 1h 44' 16"	
77	Willy Van Neste	Belgium	Frisol	30	+ 56' 37"	
78	Roger Gilson	Luxembourg	Frisol	45	+ 2h 20' 55"	
79	Gerard Kamper	Netherlands	Frisol	DNF	—	
80	Paul Lannoo	Belgium	Frisol	DNF	—	
81	Eric Leman	Belgium	Zoppas–Splendor	DNF	—	
82	Ger Harings	Netherlands	Zoppas–Splendor	DNF	—	
83	Dieudonné Depireux	Belgium	Zoppas–Splendor	DNF	—	
84	Willy Scheers	Belgium	Zoppas–Splendor	48	+ 2h 44' 13"	
85	Jacques Martin	Belgium	Zoppas–Splendor	DNF	—	
86	Raphaël Constant	Belgium	Zoppas–Splendor	DNF	—	
87	Georges Barras	Belgium	Zoppas–Splendor	DNF	—	
88	Christian Dubois	Belgium	Zoppas–Splendor	DNF	—	
89	Freddy Libouton	Belgium	Zoppas–Splendor	DNF	—	
90	Ronny De Bisschop	Belgium	Zoppas–Splendor	DNF	—	
91	Herman Van Springel	Belgium	Flandria–Velda	29	+ 55' 05"	
92	Daniel Verplancke	Belgium	Flandria–Velda	40	+ 2h 07' 16"	
93	Arthur Van De Vijver	Belgium	Flandria–Velda	41	+ 2h 12' 43"	
94	Willem Schroyens	Belgium	Flandria–Velda	DNF	—	
95	Benoni Michiels	Belgium	Flandria–Velda	DNF	—	
96	Dirk Ongenae	Belgium	Flandria–Velda	43	+ 2h 16' 11"	
97	Marcel Van der Slagmolen	Belgium	Flandria–Velda	DNF	—	
98	Eddy Cael	Belgium	Flandria–Velda	47	+ 2h 25' 45"	
99	Carlos Cuyle	Belgium	Flandria–Velda	DNF	—	
100	Rudi Hesters	Belgium	Flandria–Velda	DNF	—	
