= List of rosters for BEAT Cycling Club =

This is a list of team rosters by season for UCI Continental team and UCI Track Team BEAT Cycling Club.

== Road ==
=== 2023 ===
As of 27 February 2023.

| Rider | Date of birth |
|---|---|
| Matthijs Büchli (NED) | 13 December 1992 (age 32) |
| Gil D'Heygere (BEL) | 30 March 1998 (age 26) |
| Stijn Daemen (NED) | 25 July 1999 (age 25) |
| Jules de Cock (NED) | 20 June 1997 (age 27) |
| Bram Dissel (NED) | 12 July 1998 (age 26) |
| Yoeri Havik (NED) | 19 February 1991 (age 34) |

| Rider | Date of birth |
|---|---|
| Vincent Hoppezak (NED) | 2 February 1999 (age 26) |
| Lucas Janssen (NED) | 6 January 2003 (age 22) |
| Jochem Kerckhaert (NED) | 29 October 2000 (age 24) |
| Emiel Vermeulen (BEL) | 16 February 1993 (age 32) |
| Guillaume Visser (NED) | 23 July 2000 (age 24) |
| Thijs Zonneveld (NED) | 28 September 1980 (age 44) |

=== 2022 ===
As of 1 March 2022.

| Rider | Date of birth |
|---|---|
| Jente Boons (BEL) | 19 March 2002 (age 23) |
| Jordy Bouts (BEL) | 8 August 1996 (age 28) |
| Matthijs Büchli (NED) | 13 December 1992 (age 32) |
| Sven Burger (NED) | 22 May 1997 (age 27) |
| Stijn Daemen (NED) | 25 July 1999 (age 25) |
| Bram Dissel (NED) | 12 July 1998 (age 26) |

| Rider | Date of birth |
|---|---|
| Yoeri Havik (NED) | 19 February 1991 (age 34) |
| Vincent Hoppezak (NED) | 2 February 1999 (age 26) |
| Lucas Janssen (NED) | 6 January 2003 (age 22) |
| Jochem Kerckhaert (NED) | 29 October 2000 (age 24) |
| Jens Schuermans (BEL) | 13 February 1993 (age 32) |
| Jan-Willem van Schip (NED) | 20 August 1994 (age 30) |

=== 2021 ===
As of 31 January 2021.

| Rider | Date of birth |
|---|---|
| Jordy Bouts (BEL) | 8 August 1996 (age 28) |
| Martijn Budding (NED) | 31 August 1995 (age 29) |
| Luuc Bugter (NED) | 10 July 1993 (age 31) |
| Sven Burger (NED) | 22 May 1997 (age 27) |
| Yves Coolen (BEL) | 25 September 1995 (age 29) |
| Piotr Havik (NED) | 7 July 1994 (age 30) |

| Rider | Date of birth |
|---|---|
| Yoeri Havik (NED) | 19 February 1991 (age 34) |
| Jules Hesters (BEL) | 11 November 1998 (age 26) |
| Marten Kooistra (NED) | 18 October 1997 (age 27) |
| Stefano Museeuw (BEL) | 1 June 1997 (age 27) |
| Herman ten Kate (NED) | 28 October 1991 (age 33) |
| Jan-Willem van Schip (NED) | 20 August 1994 (age 30) |

=== 2020 ===
As of 2 March 2020.

| Rider | Date of birth |
|---|---|
| Daniel Abraham (NED) | 11 February 1985 (age 40) |
| Luuc Bugter (NED) | 10 July 1993 (age 31) |
| Yves Coolen (BEL) | 25 September 1995 (age 29) |
| Nahom Desale (ERI) | 3 December 1992 (age 32) |
| Marten Kooistra (NED) | 18 October 1997 (age 27) |
| Adam Lewis (GBR) | 21 August 1995 (age 29) |

| Rider | Date of birth |
|---|---|
| Alex Mengoulas (NED) | 13 July 1997 (age 27) |
| Stefano Museeuw (BEL) | 1 June 1997 (age 27) |
| Guillaume Seye (BEL) | 28 November 1996 (age 28) |
| Bas van der Kooij (NED) | 16 November 1995 (age 29) |
| Jan-Willem van Schip (NED) | 20 August 1994 (age 30) |

=== 2019 ===
| Rider | Date of birth |
|---|---|
| Daniel Abraham (NED) | 11 February 1985 (age 40) |
| Martijn Budding (NED) | 31 August 1995 (age 29) |
| Luuc Bugter (NED) | 10 July 1993 (age 31) |
| Yves Coolen (BEL) | 25 September 1995 (age 29) |
| Nahom Desale (ERI) | 3 December 1992 (age 32) |

| Rider | Date of birth |
|---|---|
| Piotr Havik (NED) | 7 July 1994 (age 30) |
| Daan Hoeyberghs (BEL) | 18 September 1994 (age 30) |
| Adam Lewis (GBR) | 21 August 1995 (age 29) |
| Alex Mengoulas (NED) | 13 July 1997 (age 27) |
| Guillaume Seye (BEL) | 28 November 1996 (age 28) |

=== 2018 ===
| Rider | Date of birth |
|---|---|
| Daniel Abraham (NED) | 11 February 1985 (age 40) |
| Nahom Desale (ERI) | 3 December 1992 (age 32) |
| Piotr Havik (NED) | 7 July 1994 (age 30) |
| Daan Hoeyberghs (BEL) | 18 September 1994 (age 30) |
| Arjen Livyns (Note: Arjen Livyns left team in March 2018 to ride for Vérandas Willems–Crelan.) (BEL) | 1 September 1994 (age 30) |

| Rider | Date of birth |
|---|---|
| Danny Maas (NED) | 8 April 1999 (age 25) |
| Alex Mengoulas (NED) | 13 July 1997 (age 27) |
| Aksel Nommela (EST) | 22 October 1994 (age 30) |
| Bas Tietema (NED) | 29 January 1995 (age 30) |
| Wesley Van Dyck (BEL) | 15 September 1994 (age 30) |

== Track ==
=== 2023 ===
As of 27 February 2023.

| Rider | Date of birth |
|---|---|
| Matthijs Büchli (NED) | 13 December 1992 (age 32) |
| Yoeri Havik (NED) | 19 February 1991 (age 34) |
| Vincent Hoppezak (NED) | 2 February 1999 (age 26) |
| Tijmen van Loon (NED) | 20 March 2001 (age 23) |

=== 2021 ===
As of 31 January 2021.

| Rider | Date of birth |
|---|---|
| Theo Bos (NED) | 22 August 1984 (age 40) |
| Matthijs Büchli (NED) | 13 December 1992 (age 32) |
| Yoeri Havik (NED) | 19 February 1991 (age 34) |
| Laurine van Riessen (NED) | 10 August 1987 (age 37) |
| Jan-Willem van Schip (NED) | 20 August 1994 (age 30) |

=== 2020 ===
As of 8 March 2020.

| Rider | Date of birth |
|---|---|
| Theo Bos (NED) | 22 August 1984 (age 40) |
| Matthijs Büchli (NED) | 13 December 1992 (age 32) |
| Nicky Degrendele (BEL) | 11 October 1996 (age 28) |
| Roy van den Berg (NED) | 8 September 1988 (age 36) |
| Laurine van Riessen (NED) | 10 August 1987 (age 37) |

=== 2018 ===
| Rider | Date of birth |
|---|---|
| Theo Bos (NED) | 22 August 1984 (age 40) |
| Matthijs Büchli (NED) | 13 December 1992 (age 32) |
| Nicky Degrendele (BEL) | 11 October 1996 (age 28) |
| Roy van den Berg (NED) | 8 September 1988 (age 36) |
| Laurine van Riessen (NED) | 10 August 1987 (age 37) |

=== 2017 ===
| Rider | Date of birth |
|---|---|
| Theo Bos (NED) | 22 August 1984 (age 40) |
| Matthijs Büchli (NED) | 13 December 1992 (age 32) |
| Roy van den Berg (NED) | 8 September 1988 (age 36) |
