= 1977 Vuelta a España =

Race details
- Dates: 26 April – 15 May
- Stages: 19 stages + Prologue, including 1 split stages
- Distance: 2,785 km (1,731 mi)
- Winning time: 78h 54' 36"

Results
Jersey awarded to the overall winner	Winner	Freddy Maertens (BEL)	(Flandria – Latina)
	Second	Miguel María Lasa (ESP)	(Teka)
	Third	Klaus-Peter Thaler (FRG)	(Teka)
Jersey awarded to the points classification winner	Points	Freddy Maertens (BEL)	(Flandria – Latina)
	Mountains	Pedro Torres (ESP)	(Teka)
Jersey awarded to the sprints classification winner	Sprints	Freddy Maertens (BEL)	(Flandria – Latina)
	Team	Teka	

The 32nd Edition Vuelta a España (Tour of Spain), a long-distance bicycle stage race and one of the three grand tours, was held from 26 April to 15 May 1977. It consisted of 19 stages covering a total of 2,785 km (1,731 mi), and was won by Freddy Maertens of the Flandria cycling team. While Maertens dominated the race he won the General Classification by less than 3:00. The domination was from his record shattering 13 stages wins including the first and the last. He also won the points classification. Pedro Torres won the mountains classification.

== Route ==
List of stages
Stage	Date	Course	Distance	Type	Winner
P	26 April	Dehesa de Campoamor to Dehesa de Campoamor	8 km (5 mi)	Individual time trial	Freddy Maertens (BEL)
1	27 April	Dehesa de Campoamor to La Manga	115 km (71 mi)		Freddy Maertens (BEL)
2	28 April	La Manga to Murcia	161 km (100 mi)		Freddy Maertens (BEL)
3	29 April	Murcia to Benidorm	200 km (124 mi)		Fedor den Hertog (NED)
4	30 April	Benidorm to Benidorm	8.3 km (5 mi)	Individual time trial	Michel Pollentier (BEL)
5	1 May	Benidorm to El Saler	159 km (99 mi)		Freddy Maertens (BEL)
6	2 May	Valencia to Teruel	170 km (106 mi)		Freddy Maertens (BEL)
7	3 May	Teruel to Alcalà de Xivert	204 km (127 mi)		Freddy Maertens (BEL)
8	4 May	Alcalà de Xivert to Tortosa	141 km (88 mi)		Freddy Maertens (BEL)
9	5 May	Tortosa to Salou	144 km (89 mi)		Freddy Maertens (BEL)
10	6 May	Salou to Barcelona	144 km (89 mi)		Cees Priem (NED)
11a	7 May	Barcelona to Barcelona	3.8 km (2 mi)	Individual time trial	Freddy Maertens (BEL)
11b	7 May	Barcelona to Barcelona	45 km (28 mi)		Freddy Maertens (BEL)
12	8 May	Barcelona to La Tossa de Montbui (Santa Margarida de Montbui)	198 km (123 mi)		Giuseppe Perletto (ITA)
13	9 May	Igualada to La Seu d'Urgell	135 km (84 mi)		Freddy Maertens (BEL)
14	10 May	La Seu d'Urgell to Monzón	200 km (124 mi)		Carlos Melero (ESP)
15	11 May	Monzón to Formigal	166 km (103 mi)		Pedro Torres (ESP)
16	12 May	Formigal to Cordovilla	170 km (106 mi)		Freddy Maertens (BEL)
17	13 May	Cordovilla to Bilbao	183 km (114 mi)		Luis Alberto Ordiales (ESP)
18	14 May	Bilbao to Urkiola	126 km (78 mi)		José Nazabal (ESP)
19	15 May	Durango to Miranda de Ebro	104 km (65 mi)		Freddy Maertens (BEL)
	Total		2,785 km (1,731 mi)		

== Classification leadership ==
Classification leadership by stage
Stage	Winner	General classification	Points classification	Mountains classification	Intermediate sprints classification
P	Freddy Maertens	Freddy Maertens	not awarded	not awarded	not awarded
1	Freddy Maertens	Freddy Maertens	Freddy Maertens	Pedro Torres	Ferdi Van Den Haute
2	Freddy Maertens	Freddy Maertens	Freddy Maertens	Pedro Torres	Freddy Maertens
3	Fedor den Hertog	Freddy Maertens	Freddy Maertens	Andrés Oliva	Geert Malfait
4	Michel Pollentier	Freddy Maertens	Freddy Maertens	Pedro Torres	Geert Malfait
5	Freddy Maertens	Freddy Maertens	Freddy Maertens	Pedro Torres	Geert Malfait
6	Freddy Maertens	Freddy Maertens	Freddy Maertens	Andrés Oliva	Geert Malfait
7	Freddy Maertens	Freddy Maertens	Freddy Maertens	Andrés Oliva	Daniele Tinchella
8	Freddy Maertens	Freddy Maertens	Freddy Maertens	Andrés Oliva	Daniele Tinchella
9	Freddy Maertens	Freddy Maertens	Freddy Maertens	Pedro Torres	Daniele Tinchella
10	Cees Priem	Freddy Maertens	Freddy Maertens	Andrés Oliva	Daniele Tinchella
11a	Freddy Maertens	Freddy Maertens	Freddy Maertens	Andrés Oliva	Daniele Tinchella
11b	Freddy Maertens	Freddy Maertens	Freddy Maertens	Andrés Oliva	Daniele Tinchella
12	Giuseppe Perletto	Freddy Maertens	Freddy Maertens	Pedro Torres	Daniele Tinchella
13	Freddy Maertens	Freddy Maertens	Freddy Maertens	Pedro Torres	Daniele Tinchella
14	Carlos Melero	Freddy Maertens	Freddy Maertens	Pedro Torres	Daniele Tinchella
15	Pedro Torres	Freddy Maertens	Freddy Maertens	Pedro Torres	Daniele Tinchella
16	Freddy Maertens	Freddy Maertens	Freddy Maertens	Pedro Torres	Daniele Tinchella
17	Luis Alberto Ordiales	Freddy Maertens	Freddy Maertens	Pedro Torres	Daniele Tinchella
18	José Nazabal	Freddy Maertens	Freddy Maertens	Pedro Torres	Daniele Tinchella
19	Freddy Maertens	Freddy Maertens	Freddy Maertens	Pedro Torres	Freddy Maertens
Final		Freddy Maertens	Freddy Maertens	Pedro Torres	Freddy Maertens

== Results ==
The 1977 Vuelta a España had several classifications. The most important classification was the general classification; this was won by Freddy Maertens.

Final general classification
Rank	Rider	Team	Time
1	(Belgium) Freddy Maertens	Flandria–Velda–Latina Assicurazioni	78h 54' 36"
2	(Spain) Miguel María Lasa	Teka	+ 2' 51"
3	(Germany) Klaus-Peter Thaler	Teka	+ 3' 23"
4	(Spain) Domingo Perurena	Kas–Campagnolo	+ 4' 45"
5	(Spain) José Viejo	Kas–Campagnolo	+ 5' 14"
6	(Belgium) Michel Pollentier	Flandria–Velda–Latina Assicurazioni	+ 5' 35"
7	(Australia) Gary Clively	Magniflex–Torpado	+ 7' 06"
8	(Spain) José Pesarrodona	Kas–Campagnolo	+ 9' 32"
9	(Spain) Pedro Torres	Teka	+ 10' 29"
10	(Spain) José Antonio González	Kas–Campagnolo	+ 11' 18"
11	(Spain) Agustín Tamames	Teka	
12	(Spain) José Manuel García	Novostil–Transmallorca	
13	(Portugal) Fernando Mendes	Teka	
14	(Belgium) Ludo Loos	Ebo–Superia	
15	(Portugal) Joaquim Agostinho	Teka	
16	(Spain) Ismael Lejarreta	Kas–Campagnolo	
17	(Spain) Andrés Oliva	Kas–Campagnolo	
18	(Spain) Rafael Ladrón	Kas–Campagnolo	
19	(Spain) Eulalio García	Kas–Campagnolo	
20	(Spain) Carlos Ocaña	Kas–Campagnolo	
21	(Spain) José Nazabal	Kas–Campagnolo	
22	(Spain) Luis Ocaña	Frisol–Thirion–Gazelle	
23	(Spain) Carlos Melero	Teka	
24	(Spain) Javier Elorriaga	Teka	
25	(Italy) Giuseppe Perletto	Magniflex–Torpado	

Additionally, there were the points classification (also won by Maertens), the mountains classification won by Pedro Torres, and the intermediate sprints classification also won by Maertens. To be eligible for these secondary classifications, a rider had to finish in the top 25 of the general classification; this was relevant for the intermediate sprints classification, where Daniele Tinchella and Benny Schepmans had more points than Maertens, but did not finish in the top 25.

There was also an award for the best Spanish rider in the general classification, won by Miguel María Lasa, and a team classification won by Teka.
