= De Kustpijl =

Belgian one-day road cycling race

- Poster to the 2019 edition

Race details
- Date: September
- Region: Belgium
- Discipline: Road
- Competition: UCI Europe Tour
- Type: One-day race
- Web site: dekustpijl.be

History
- First edition: 1962
- Editions: 48 (as of 2019)
- First winner: Gilbert Desmet (BEL)
- Most wins: Alain Desaever (BEL) (3 wins)
- Most recent: Bas van der Kooij (NED)

De Kustpijl is a cycling race held annually in Belgium. It is part of UCI Europe Tour in category 1.2.

== Winners ==
Year	Winner	Second	Third
1962	(Belgium) Gilbert Desmet	(Belgium) Daniel Doom	(Belgium) Marcel Seynaeve
1963	(Belgium) Emiel Lambrecht	(United Kingdom) Tom Simpson	(Belgium) André Noyelle
1964	(Belgium) Clément Roman	(Belgium) Gustaaf Desmet	(Belgium) Julien Gaelens
1965	(Belgium) Bernard Deville	(Netherlands) Wim de Jager	(Belgium) Camiel Vyncke
1966	(Belgium) Eric Demunster	(Belgium) Jérôme Kegels	(Belgium) Norbert Van Cauwenberghe
1967	(Belgium) Noël Van Clooster	(Netherlands) Jo de Roo	(Belgium) Alfons De Bal
1968	(Belgium) Albert Van Vlierberghe	(Belgium) Ward Weckx	(Belgium) Marcel Maes
1969	(Belgium) Étienne Sonck	(Belgium) Georges Vandenberghe	(Belgium) Jacques De Boever
1970	(Belgium) André Dierickx	(Belgium) Noel Van Tyghem	(Belgium) Roger Jochmans
1971	(Belgium) Willy Teirlinck	(Belgium) Fernand Hermie	(Belgium) Roger Jochmans
1972	(Belgium) Noël Van Clooster	(Belgium) Aimé Delaere	(Belgium) Noël Van Tyghem
1973	(Belgium) Noël Van Tyghem	(Belgium) Aimé Delaere	(Belgium) Jos Abelshausen
1974	(Belgium) Patrick Sercu	(Belgium) José Vanackere	(Belgium) Lucien Zelck
1975	(Belgium) Marcel Van Der Slagmolen	(Belgium) Wilfried Reybrouck	(Belgium) Benny Schepmans
1976	(Belgium) Alain Desaever	(Spain) Manuel Santos Castillo	(Belgium) Jean-Pierre Berckmans
1977	(Belgium) Julien Stevens	(Netherlands) Fedor den Hertog	(Belgium) Herman Vrijders
1978	(Belgium) Frans Van Looy	(Belgium) Freddy Maertens	(Netherlands) Fons van Katwijk
1979	(Belgium) Marc Demeyer	(Belgium) Gery Verlinden	(Belgium) Frans Van Looy
1980	(Belgium) Emiel Gijsemans	(Belgium) Frans Van Looy	(Belgium) Paul De Keyser
1981	(Belgium) Gery Verlinden	(Belgium) Ronny Claes	(Belgium) Frans Van Looy
1982	(Belgium) Kurt Dockx	(Belgium) Werner Devos	(Belgium) Frans Van Looy
1983	(Belgium) Alain Desaever	(Belgium) Noël Segers	(Belgium) Josef Lieckens
1984	(Belgium) Alain Desaever	(Belgium) Marc Van Geel	(Denmark) Gert Frank
1985	(Belgium) Ronny Van Holen	(Belgium) Gery Verlinden	(Netherlands) Reinier Valkenburg
1986	(Belgium) Patrick Versluys	(Belgium) Rudy Dhaenens	(Belgium) Gino Ligneel
1987	(Belgium) Marnix Lameire	(Italy) Roberto Gaggioli	(Belgium) Bruno Geuens
1988	(Netherlands) Hans Daams	(Belgium) Yvan Lamote	(Belgium) Frank Hoste
1989	(Netherlands) Peter Pieters	(Belgium) Marc Assez	(Belgium) Patrick Verplancke
1990	(Belgium) Marnix Lameire	(Belgium) Herman Frison	(Netherlands) Patrick Bol
1991	(Lithuania) Jonas Romanovas	(Netherlands) Louis de Koning	(Poland) Marek Kulas
1992	(Netherlands) Michel Cornelisse	(Netherlands) Adrie van der Poel	(Netherlands) Patrick Strouken
1993	(Netherlands) Michel Cornelisse	(Belgium) Wim Omloop	(Belgium) Tom Desmet
1994	(Netherlands) Jelle Nijdam	(Belgium) Jan Van Camp	(Belgium) Patrick Van Roosbroeck
1995	(Belgium) Peter Van Petegem	(Belgium) Carlo Bomans	(Latvia) Arvis Piziks
1996	(Belgium) Tom Steels	(Netherlands) Jans Koerts	(Netherlands) Michel Cornelisse
1997	(Belgium) Robbie Vandaele	(Netherlands) Michael van der Wolf	(Belgium) Peter Verbeken
1998	(Belgium) Bert Roesems	(Belgium) Wim Omloop	(Belgium) Hans De Meester
1999	(Belgium) Michel Vanhaecke	(Belgium) Niko Eeckhout	(Belgium) Franky Van Haesebroucke
2000	(Belgium) Jurgen Vermeersch	(Belgium) Davy Delme	(Belgium) Michel Vanhaecke
2001	(Netherlands) Arthur Farenhout	(Netherlands) Danny Stam	(United States) Jeff Louder
2002–2011	No race		
2012	(Belgium) Kevin Claeys	(Belgium) Andy Cappelle	(United States) Ken Hanson
2013	(Lithuania) Egidijus Juodvalkis	(France) Florian Sénéchal	(Netherlands) Brian van Goethem
2014	(Belgium) Michael Van Staeyen	(Belgium) Robin Stenuit	(Belgium) Roy Jans
2015	(Italy) Marco Zanotti	(Netherlands) Coen Vermeltfoort	(Belgium) Roy Jans
2016	(Belgium) Timothy Dupont	(Belgium) Bert Van Lerberghe	(Belgium) Jelle Donders
2017	(Belgium) Christophe Noppe	(Belgium) Jelle Mannaerts	(Belgium) Jérôme Baugnies
2018	(Belgium) Timothy Stevens	(Belgium) Brent Van Moer	(Belgium) Dennis Coenen
2019	(Netherlands) Bas van der Kooij	(Netherlands) Arvid de Kleijn	(Belgium) Jarne Van de Paar
