= Grand Prix Albert Fauville-Baulet =

Professional cycling race

Race details
- Date: July
- Region: Hainaut, Belgium
- Discipline: Road
- Competition: UCI Europe Tour
- Type: One-day race

History
- First edition: 2016
- Editions: 3 (as of 2018)
- First winner: Dimitri Peyskens (BEL)
- Most wins: No repeat winners
- Most recent: Aksel Nõmmela (EST)

The Grand Prix Albert Fauville-Baulet is a one-day professional cycling race held annually in Belgium since 2017. It has been part of UCI Europe Tour since 2018 in category 1.2. It was known as the Mémorial Albert Fauville in 2016 and 2017.

== Winners ==
Year	Country	Rider	Team
2016	Belgium	Dimitri Peyskens	Veranclassic–Ago
2017	Belgium	Benjamin Verraes	
2018	Estonia	Aksel Nõmmela	BEAT Cycling Club
