= Aksel Nõmmela =

Estonian cyclist

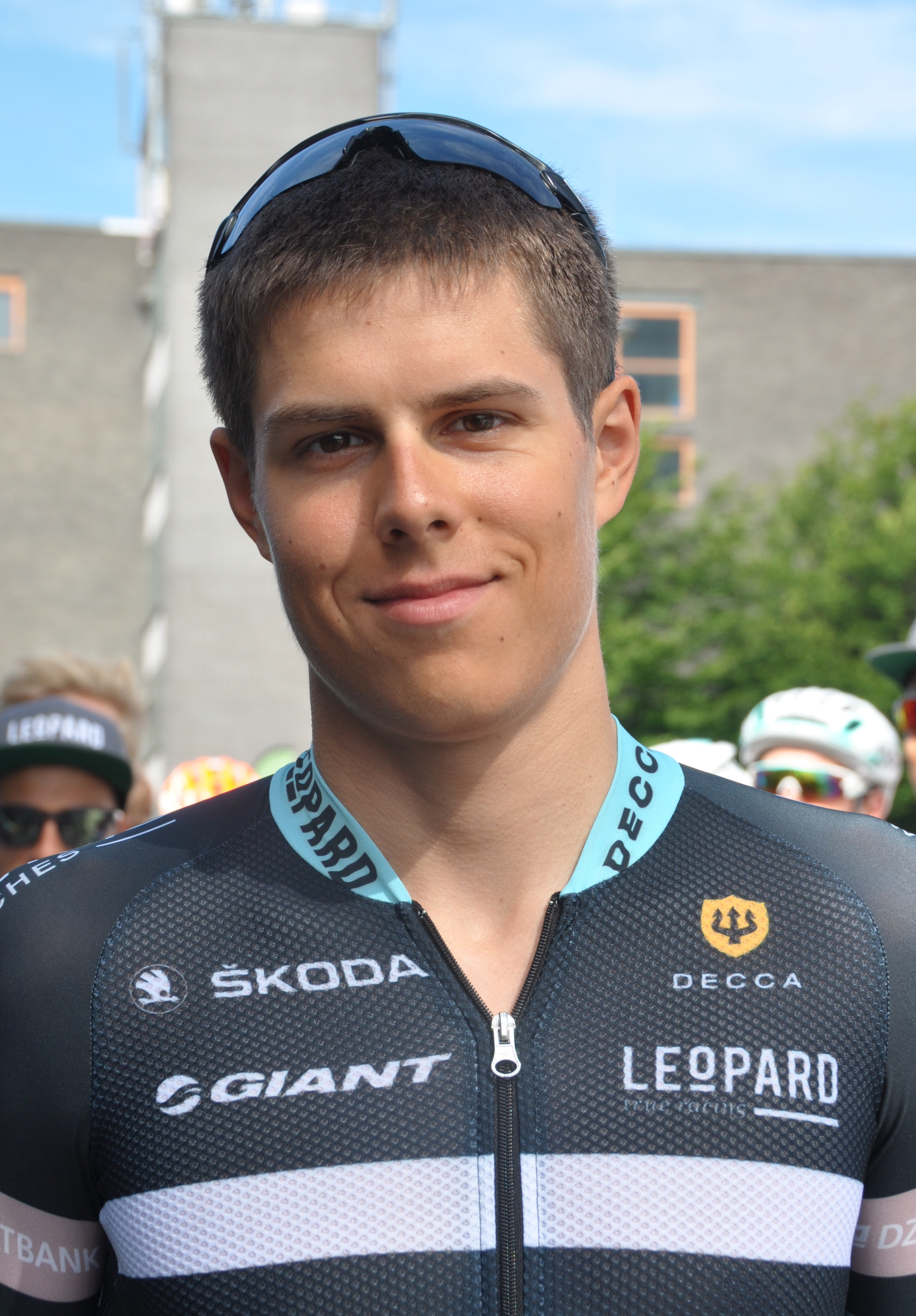
- Nõmmela in 2017.

Personal information
- Full name: Aksel Nõmmela
- Born: 22 October 1994 (age 31) Tallinn, Estonia
- Height: 1.76 m (5 ft 9 in)
- Weight: 69 kg (152 lb)

Cycling career
- Sport: Cycling
- Discipline: Road
- Role: Rider

Amateur teams
- 2011–2012: CFC Spordiklubi
- 2013: Pro Immo Nicolas Roux
- 2014: CFC Spordiklubi
- 2015: Probikeshop Saint-Étienne Loire

Professional teams
- 2016–2017: Leopard Pro Cycling
- 2018: BEAT Cycling Club
- 2019–2020: Wallonie Bruxelles

Aksel Nõmmela (born 22 October 1994) is an Estonian cyclist, who most recently rode for UCI ProTeam Bingoal–Wallonie Bruxelles.

== Major results ==
2011
1st Stage 4 Tour de la région de Łódź
3rd Time trial, National Junior Road Championships
2012
3rd Time trial, National Junior Road Championships
2015
2nd Road race, National Under-23 Road Championships
5th Road race, National Road Championships
5th La Côte Picarde
2016
2nd Road race, National Under-23 Road Championships
4th Road race, National Road Championships
4th De Kustpijl
7th Coppa dei Laghi-Trofeo Almar
7th Grote Prijs Marcel Kint
8th Road race, UCI Under-23 Road World Championships
9th Overall Ronde van Midden-Nederland
9th Ronde van Drenthe
2017
1st Stage 3b Le Triptyque des Monts et Châteaux
5th Kampioenschap van Vlaanderen
7th Road race, UEC European Road Championships
7th Grand Prix de la ville de Pérenchies
8th Grand Prix de la ville de Nogent-sur-Oise
8th Midden–Brabant Poort Omloop
10th Overall International Tour of Rhodes
2018
1st Grand Prix Albert Fauville-Baulet
2nd Antwerp Port Epic
3rd Heistse Pijl
3rd PWZ Zuidenveld Tour
4th Ronde van Midden-Nederland
5th Omloop Mandel-Leie-Schelde
5th Grote Prijs Jef Scherens
5th Ronde van Noord-Holland
6th Omloop van het Houtland
7th Grote Prijs Jean-Pierre Monseré
9th Volta Limburg Classic
10th Arno Wallaard Memorial
2019
5th Schaal Sels
6th Ronde van Drenthe
8th Grote Prijs Stad Zottegem
10th Tour de l'Eurométropole
2020
6th Grand Prix d'Isbergues
