= Martijn Budding =

Dutch cyclist (born 1995)

Martijn Pudding
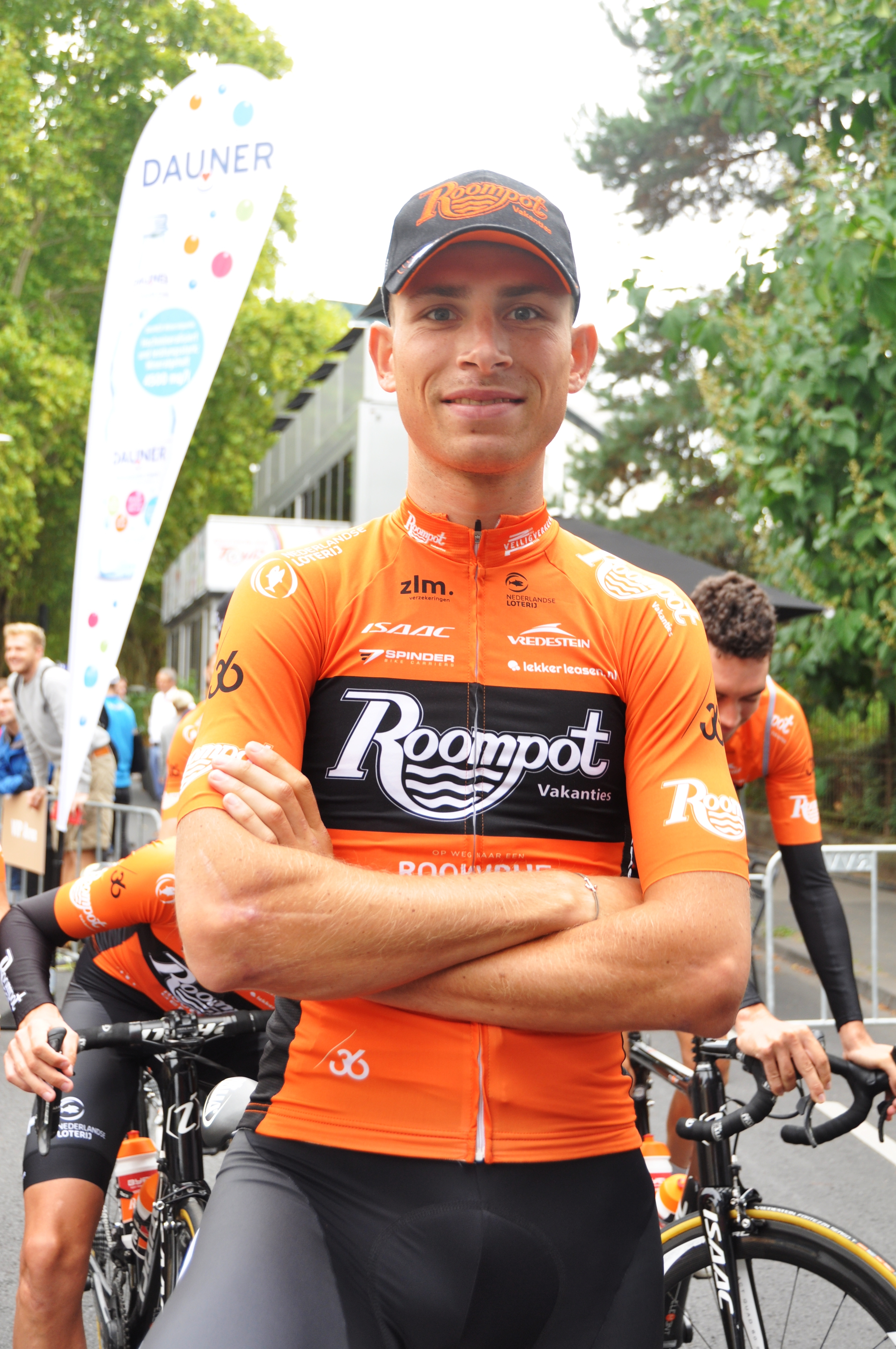
- Budding at the 2018 Deutschland Tour

Personal information
- Full name: Martijn Budding
- Born: 31 August 1995 (age 31) Veenendaal, Netherlands
- Height: 1.87 m (6 ft 2 in)
- Weight: 74 kg (163 lb)

Cycling career
- Sport: Cycling
- Current team: Unibet Rose Rockets
- Discipline: Road
- Role: Rider

Amateur team
- 2011–2013: Boxx–BKCP

Professional teams
- 2014–2016: Rabobank Development Team
- 2017–2018: Roompot–Nederlandse Loterij
- 2019: BEAT Cycling Club
- 2020: Riwal Readynez
- 2021: BEAT Cycling
- 2022: Riwal Cycling Team
- 2023–: TDT–Unibet Cycling Team

Martijn Budding (born 31 August 1995) is a Dutch cyclist, who currently rides for UCI ProTeam Unibet Rose Rockets.

== Major results ==
2014
1st Time trial, National Under–23 Road Championships
2016
1st Stage 1 Ronde de l'Oise
1st Stage 6 Olympia's Tour
2017
8th Classic Sud-Ardèche
2018
10th Overall Tour of Belgium
2019
1st Overall Tour of Rhodes

1st Stage 2

Kreiz Breizh Elites

1st Stages 1 (TTT) & 3

2nd Veenendaal–Veenendaal Classic
5th Road race, National Road Championships
6th Ronde van Limburg
7th Circuit de Wallonie
7th Druivenkoers Overijse
10th Grand Prix Pino Cerami
2021
2nd Omloop van Valkenswaard
3rd Dorpenomloop Rucphen
5th Ster van Zwolle
6th Circuit de Wallonie
7th Ronde van de Achterhoek
2022
2nd Ronde van de Achterhoek
9th Arno Wallaard Memorial
2023
2nd Ster van Zwolle
6th Ronde van Limburg
10th Veenendaal–Veenendaal Classic
