= Piotr Havik =

Dutch cyclist (born 1994)

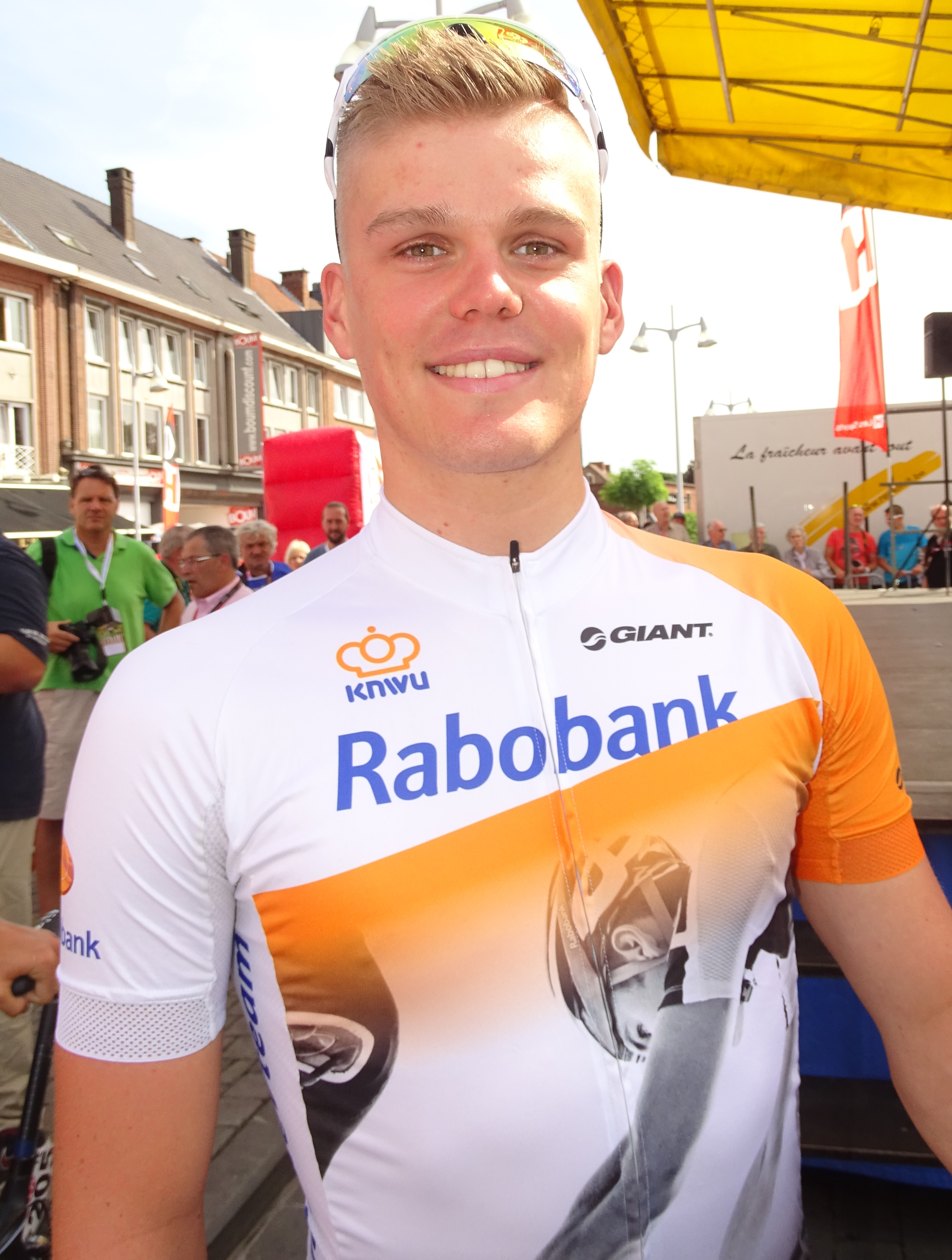
- Havik at the 2015 Grand Prix Pino Cerami.

Personal information
- Full name: Piotr Havik
- Born: 7 July 1994 (age 32) Gouda, Netherlands
- Height: 1.85 m (6 ft 1 in)
- Weight: 73 kg (161 lb)

Cycling career
- Sport: Cycling
- Current team: Shifting Gears
- Disciplines: Road; Gravel
- Role: Rider

Amateur teams
- 2012: Avia Fuji Youth
- 2013: EFC–Omega Pharma–Quick-Step
- 2014–2015: Rabobank Development Team
- 2017: WV Westland Wil Vooruit
- 2017: Team Katusha–Alpecin (stagiaire)
- 2023: Westland Wil Vooruit
- 2024–: Shifting Gears

Professional teams
- 2016: Team3M
- 2018–2019: BEAT Cycling Club
- 2020: Riwal Readynez
- 2021: BEAT Cycling

Piotr Havik (born 7 July 1994) is a Dutch racing cyclist, who currently rides for Belgian club team Shifting Gears.

== Major results ==
2011
1st Ronde des Vallées
8th Overall Liège–La Gleize
10th Omloop Mandel-Leie-Schelde Juniors
2012
1st Overall Regio-Tour
1st Overall Niedersachsen-Rundfahrt
1st Omloop Mandel-Leie-Schelde Juniors
2nd Overall Driedaagse van Axel
2nd Overall Trophée Center Morbihan
2nd Bernaudeau Junior
3rd Kuurne–Brussels–Kuurne Juniors
8th Overall Oberösterreich-Rundfahrt
10th Overall Liège–La Gleize
2013
10th Circuit de Wallonie
2014
3rd Road race, National Under–23 Road Championships
4th Ronde van Overijssel
2015
10th Grand Prix de la ville de Pérenchies
2016
7th ZODC Zuidenveld Tour
2018
1st Ronde van Overijssel
3rd Ronde van Limburg
4th Overall Tour of Estonia
7th Antwerp Port Epic
9th Duo Normand
2019
1st Grote Prijs Stad Zottegem
1st Stage 1 (TTT) Kreiz Breizh Elites
2nd Halle–Ingooigem
3rd Memorial Rik Van Steenbergen
4th Antwerp Port Epic
6th Veenendaal–Veenendaal Classic
7th Elfstedenronde
8th Rutland–Melton CiCLE Classic
10th Volta Limburg Classic
10th Grote Prijs Jef Scherens
2021
6th Antwerp Port Epic
2023
3rd Grote Prijs Stad Sint-Niklaas
UCI Gravel World Series

3rd Gravel One Fifty

2024
1st Overall Ibereolic Gravel Tierra de Campos

1st Stage 2

1st GP Florian Vermeersch
UCI Gravel World Series

2nd Limburg

4th Unbound Gravel 200
