= BEAT Cycling =

Dutch cycling team

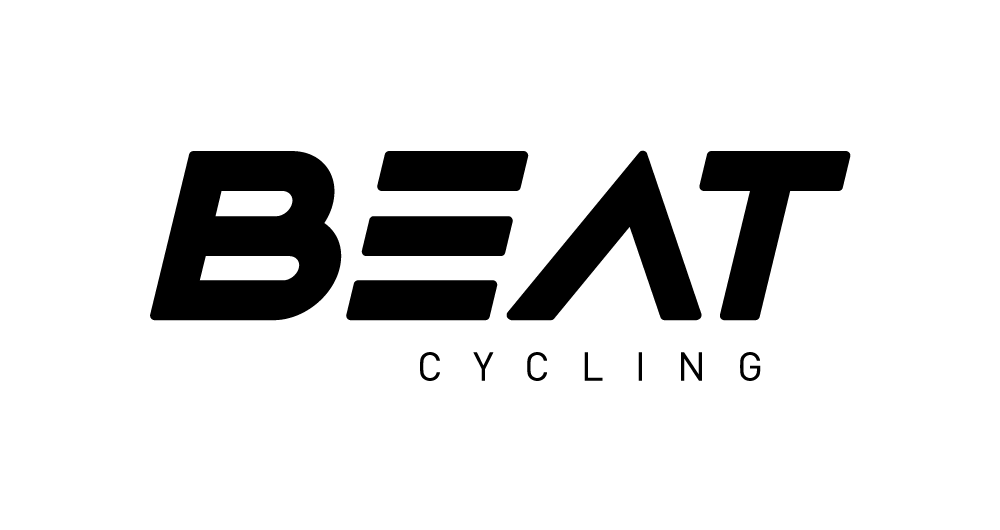

Team information
- UCI code: BCY (road); BCC (track)
- Registered: Netherlands
- Founded: 2016
- Disciplines: Road racing and Track cycling
- Status: Amateur (2017); UCI Continental (2018–)

Key personnel
- Team managers: Geert Broekhuizen; Tim Veldt; Egon Van Kessel

Team name history
- 2017–2020 2021–: BEAT Cycling Club; BEAT Cycling

BEAT Cycling is a UCI Continental team founded in 2017 that is based in the Netherlands. The team, which competes in both road and track cycling, gained UCI Continental status the following year. The team's founding riders were Matthijs Büchli, Theo Bos and Roy van den Berg. The coach is Tim Veldt.

== Team roster ==
=== Road ===
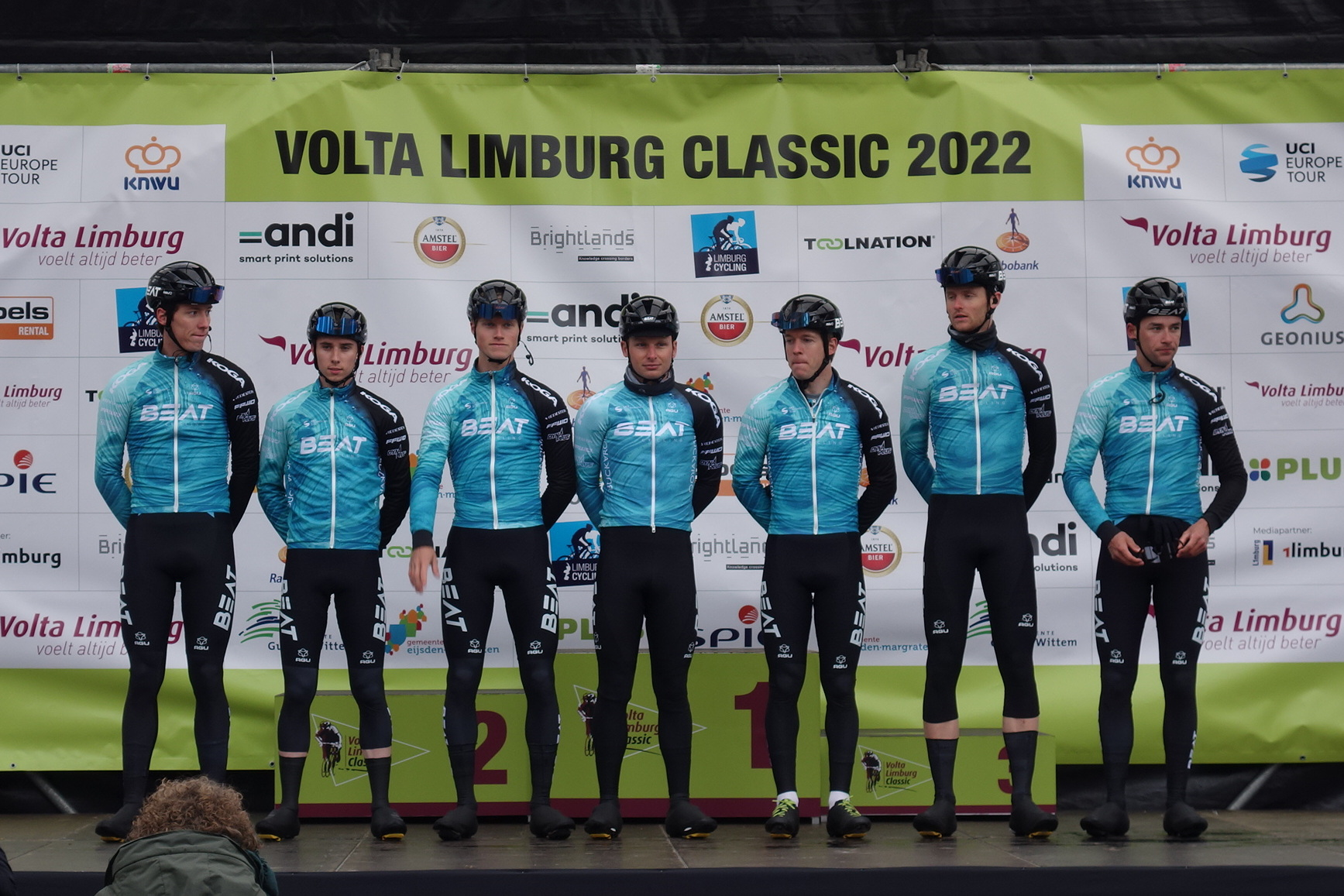
The team in 2022.

As of 16 February 2024.

Rider	Date of birth
Stijn Appel (NED)	14 December 1996 (age 29)
Matthijs Büchli (NED)	13 December 1992 (age 33)
Michiel Coppens (BEL)	17 December 2002 (age 23)
Bram Dissel (NED)	12 July 1998 (age 28)
Tijmen Eising (NED)	27 March 1991 (age 35)
Yoeri Havik (NED)	19 February 1991 (age 35)
Jochem Kerckhaert (NED)	29 October 2000 (age 26)

Rider	Date of birth
Wessel Krul (NED)	28 January 2000 (age 26)
Lars Loohuis (NED)	4 October 2000 (age 26)
Thijmen Paardekooper (NED)	24 December 2004 (age 21)
Mārtiņš Pluto (LAT)	13 January 1998 (age 28)
Jeroen Van Krimpen (NED)	2 March 1999 (age 27)
Daan van Sintmaartensdijk (NED)	11 June 1998 (age 28)
Thijs Zonneveld (NED)	28 September 1980 (age 46)

=== Track ===
As of 27 February 2023.

Rider	Date of birth
Matthijs Büchli (NED)	13 December 1992 (age 33)
Yoeri Havik (NED)	19 February 1991 (age 35)
Vincent Hoppezak (NED)	2 February 1999 (age 27)
Tijmen van Loon (NED)	20 March 2001 (age 25)

== Major results ==
=== Road ===
2018
Ronde van Overijssel, Piotr Havik
Grand Prix Albert Fauville-Baulet, Aksel Nõmmela

2019
Overall Tour of Rhodes, Martijn Budding

Stage 2, Martijn Budding

PWZ Zuidenveld Tour, Luuc Bugter
Overall Tour d'Eure-et-Loir, Luuc Bugter

Stage 3, Luuc Bugter

Stage 1b Tour de la Mirabelle, Martijn Budding
Stage 1 Kreiz Breizh Elites, Team time trial (Note: The winning riders were Martijn Budding, Nahom Desale, Luuc Bugter, Piotr Havik, Daniel Abraham and Yves Coolen)
Stage 3 Kreiz Breizh Elites, Martijn Budding
GP Stad Zottegem, Piotr Havik

2025
1st GP Slovenian Istria Michiel Coppens

=== Track ===
2017–2018
UCI Track Cycling World Championships (Team Sprint), Matthijs Büchli
UCI Track Cycling World Cup – Minsk (Sprint), Matthijs Büchli
UCI Track Cycling World Cup – Minsk (Keirin), Matthijs Büchli
UCI Track Cycling World Cup – Minsk (Team Sprint), Roy van den Berg
UCI Track Cycling World Cup – Minsk (Team Sprint), Theo Bos
UCI Track Cycling World Cup – Minsk (Team Sprint), Matthijs Büchli
(Netherlands) Dutch National Track Championships (Keirin), Matthijs Büchli
(Netherlands) Dutch National Track Championships (Sprint), Matthijs Büchli
(Netherlands) Dutch National Track Championships (Team Sprint), Roy van den Berg
(Netherlands) Dutch National Track Championships (Team Sprint), Theo Bos
(Netherlands) Dutch National Track Championships (Team Sprint), Matthijs Büchli
UCI Track Cycling World Cup – Manchester (Keirin), Matthijs Büchli
UCI Track Cycling World Cup – Pruszków (Keirin), Matthijs Büchli

2018–2019
UCI Track Cycling World Championships (Keirin), Matthijs Büchli
UCI Track Cycling World Championships (Team Sprint), Matthijs Büchli and Roy van den Berg (with Harrie Lavreysen and Jeffrey Hoogland)
UCI Track Cycling World Cup – London(Keirin), Theo Bos
(Netherlands) Dutch National Track Championships (Keirin), Laurine van Riessen
(Netherlands) Dutch National Track Championships (1 km Time Trial), Roy van den Berg
(Netherlands) Dutch National Track Championships (Sprint), Laurine van Riessen
(Netherlands) Dutch National Track Championships (Sprint), Matthijs Büchli
UCI Track Cycling World Cup – London(Keirin), Matthijs Büchli
UCI Track Cycling World Cup – Berlin (Keirin), Matthijs Büchli
(Netherlands) Dutch National Track Championships (Team sprint), Matthijs Büchli, Theo Bos and Roy van den Berg
UCI Track Cycling World Cup – Saint Quentin-en-Yvelines (Keirin), Laurine van Riessen
