= Luuc Bugter =

Dutch racing cyclist

Personal information
- Born: 10 July 1993 (age 33) Arnhem, Netherlands
- Height: 1.89 m (6 ft 2 in)
- Weight: 81 kg (179 lb)

Cycling career
- Sport: Cycling
- Current team: Retired
- Discipline: Road
- Role: Rider

Amateur teams
- 2012: Rucanor Line CT
- 2013–2014: Croford

Professional teams
- 2015: Baby-Dump Cyclingteam
- 2016–2018: Cyclingteam Join-S–De Rijke
- 2018: Vérandas Willems–Crelan (stagiaire)
- 2019–2021: BEAT Cycling Club

Luuc Bugter (born 10 July 1993) is a Dutch former professional racing cyclist.

== Major results ==
2013
7th Kernen Omloop Echt-Susteren
2014
6th Overall Sharjah International Cycling Tour

1st Young rider classification

2015
1st Acht van Chaam
4th Dorpenomloop Rucphen
8th Kernen Omloop Echt-Susteren
10th Overall Tour of China I
2016
10th Ster van Zwolle
2017
4th GP Viborg
6th Dorpenomloop Rucphen
8th Himmerland Rundt
2018
1st Overall Rás Tailteann

1st Points classification
1st Stage 3

5th Slag om Norg
7th Midden–Brabant Poort Omloop
2019
1st Overall Tour d'Eure-et-Loir

1st Stage 3

1st PWZ Zuidenveld Tour
1st Stage 1 (TTT) Kreiz Breizh Elites
3rd International Rhodes Grand Prix
10th Omloop Mandel-Leie-Schelde
