= Thijs Zonneveld =

Dutch bicycle racer and journalist

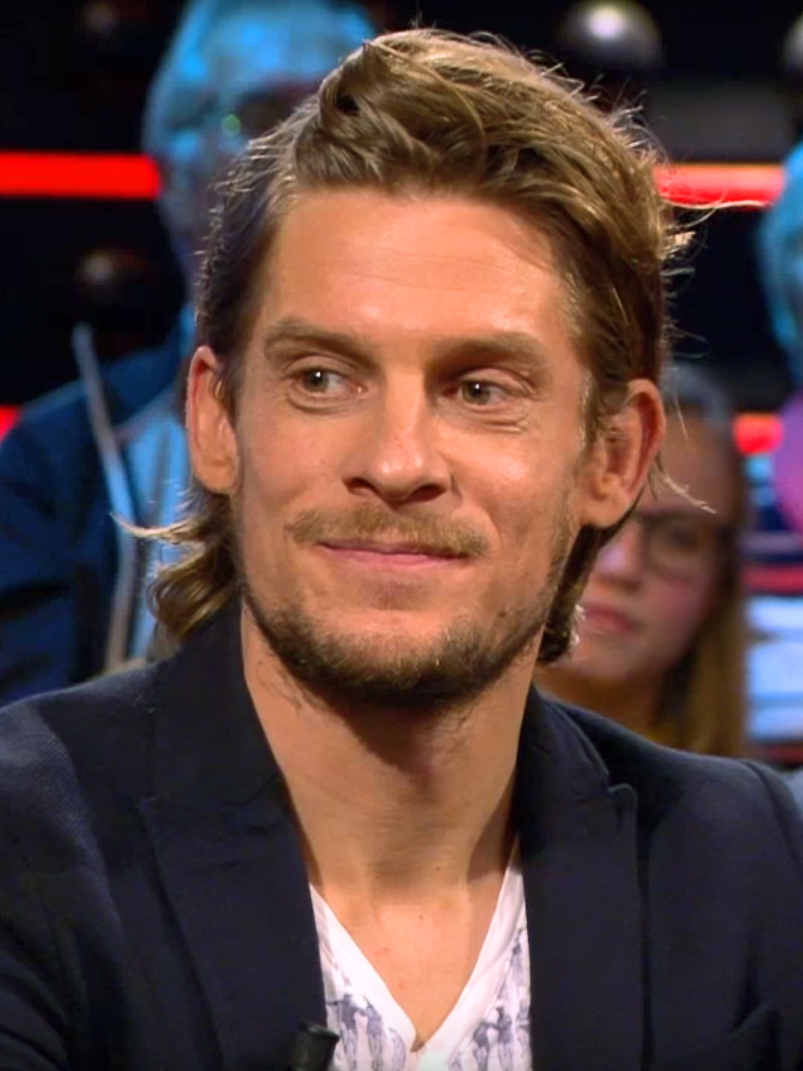
- Zonneveld during a 2017 edition of De Wereld Draait Door

Personal information
- Full name: Thijs Zonneveld
- Born: 28 September 1980 (age 46) Leiden, Netherlands
- Height: 1.80 m (5 ft 11 in)
- Weight: 63 kg (139 lb)

Cycling career
- Sport: Cycling
- Current team: BEAT CC p/b Saxo
- Disciplines: Road; Mountain biking
- Role: Rider

Amateur teams
- 2004–2005: AVC Aix-en Provence
- 2006: Camargo Roper
- 2017–?: Theo Schilder Tweewielers

Professional teams
- 2002–2003: Cyclingteam Löwik–Tegeltoko
- 2007: Discovery Channel–Marco Polo
- 2016: Parkhotel Valkenburg Continental Team
- 2023–: BEAT Cycling Club

Thijs Zonneveld (born 28 September 1980 in Leiden) is a Dutch journalist and a cyclist, who currently rides for UCI Continental team BEAT CC p/b Saxo.

== Major results ==
2004
6th Scandinavian Open Road Race
6th Grand Prix de Saint-Étienne Loire
2005
1st Stage 3 Volta Ciclista Internacional a Lleida
9th La Roue Tourangelle
2007
4th Rund um Düren
