= Lieven Malfait =

Belgian cyclist

Personal information
- Born: 18 June 1952 (age 74)

Cycling career
- Sport: Cycling
- Role: Rider

Lieven Malfait (born 18 June 1952) is a Belgian racing cyclist. He rode in the 1979 Tour de France.
