= Michael Neel =

Personal information
- Born: July 18, 1951 (age 75) Berkeley, California, United States

Cycling career
- Sport: Cycling

Michael Neel (born July 18, 1951) is an American former cyclist. He competed in the individual road race event at the 1976 Summer Olympics. Then, as a new professional, at the 1976 Professional World Road Race, he finished in 10th place

He was the directeur sportif of the 7-Eleven Cycling Team from 1985 to 1989.
