= Cordovilla =

- municipality
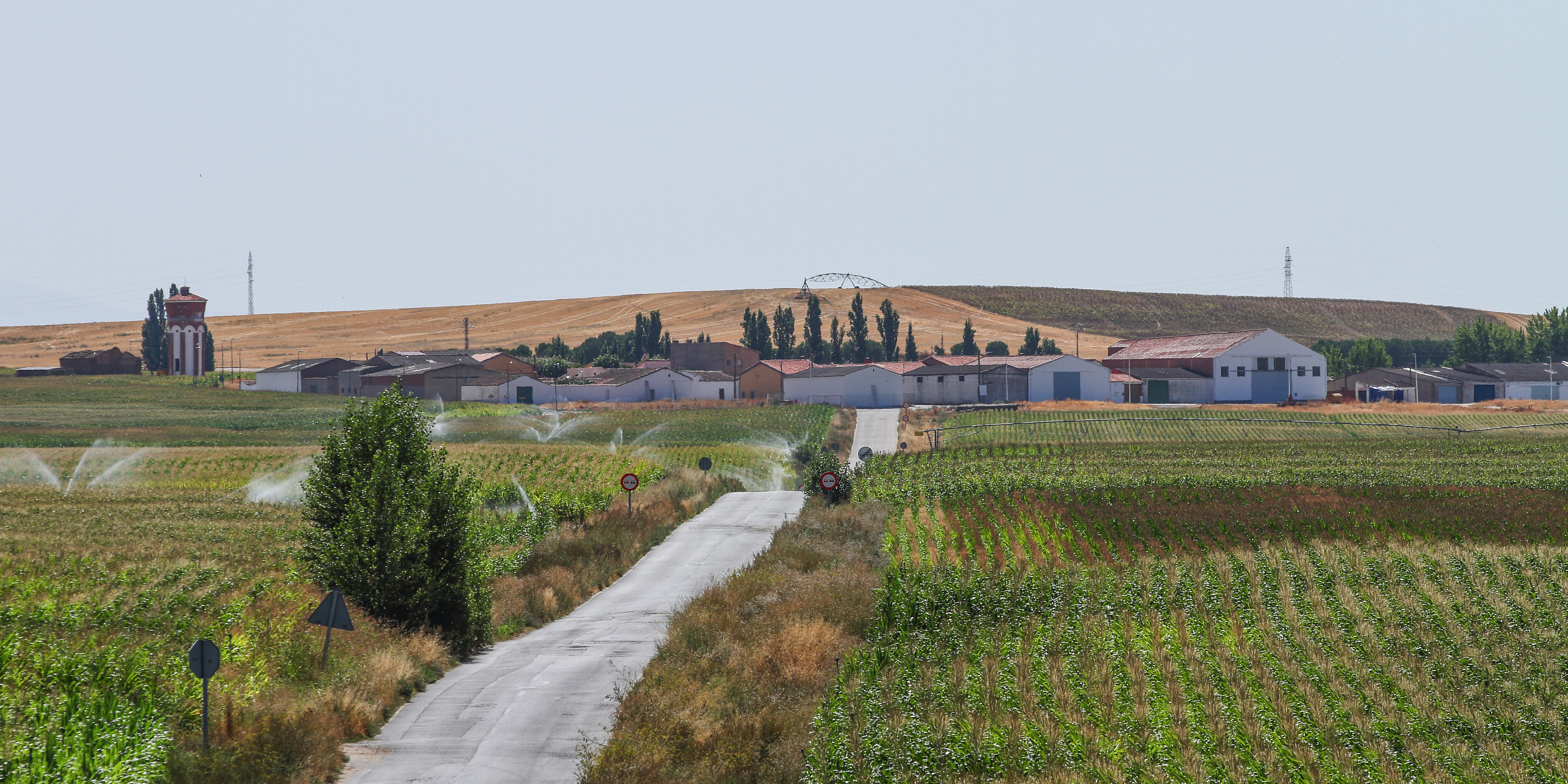

- Flag Coat of arms

- Location in Salamanca

- Location in Spain
- Coordinates: 40°57′03″N 5°24′21″W
- Country: Spain
- Autonomous community: Castile and León
- Province: Salamanca
- Comarca: Las Villas

Government
  - Mayor: Manuela Noreña (People's Party)

Area
  - Total: 16 km^{2} (6.2 sq mi)
- Elevation: 830 m (2,720 ft)

Population (2025-01-01)
  - Total: 105
  - Density: 6.6/km^{2} (17/sq mi)
- Time zone: UTC+1 (CET)
  - Summer (DST): UTC+2 (CEST)
- Postal code: 37337

Cordovilla is a village and municipality in the province of Salamanca, western Spain, part of the autonomous community of Castile-Leon. It is located 25 kilometres (16 mi) from the provincial capital city of Salamanca and has a population of 129 people.

== Geography ==
The municipality covers an area of 16 km^{2} (6.2 sq mi). It lies 830 metres (2,720 ft) above sea level and the postal code is 37337.
