= Dehesa de Campoamor =

Village in Orihuela, Spain

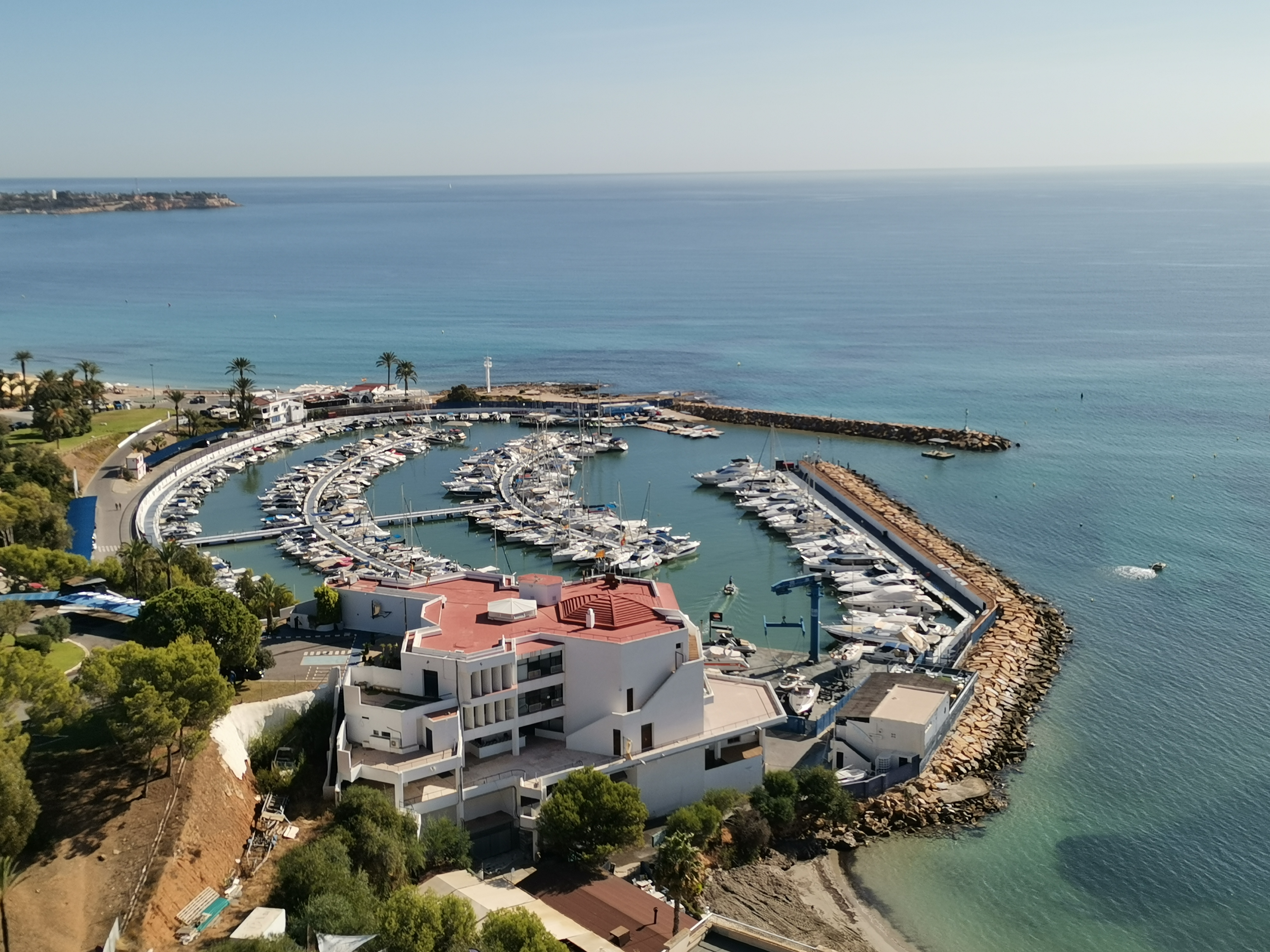
Dehesa de Campoamor Port

Dehesa de Campoamor is a village in the Orihuela Costa district in the municipality of Orihuela. It is located in the south of Alicante province and in the autonomous Valencian community, near the boundary with the autonomous Región de Murcia .

In 2018, the population was estimated to be 857.

One notable feature of Dehesa de Campoamor is the pine forest located there.
