= José Pesarrodona =

Spanish cyclist

Josep Pesarrodona
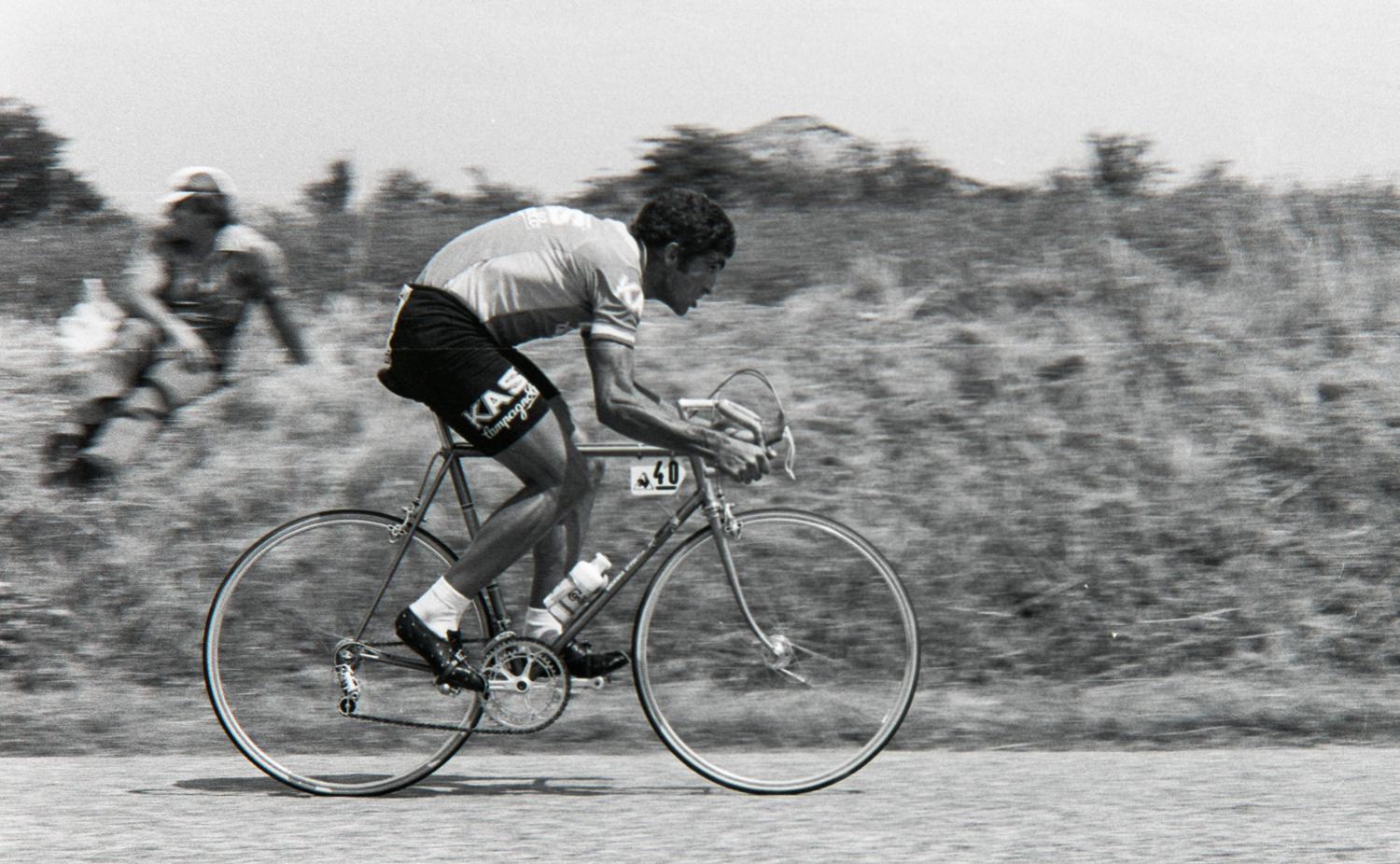

Personal information
- Full name: Josep Pesarrodona Altimira
- Born: 1 February 1946 (age 80) Sant Salvador de Guardiola, Spain

Cycling career
- Sport: Cycling
- Current team: Retired
- Discipline: Road
- Role: Rider

Major wins
- Grand Tours Vuelta a España General classification (1976)

Josep Pesarrodona Altimi (born 1 February 1946) is a former Spanish professional road bicycle racer who raced during the 1970s. Pesarrodona won the 1976 Vuelta a España ahead of Luis Ocaña and Jose Nazabal of Spain. Two years later at the 1978 Vuelta a España, he finished second to Bernard Hinault of France.

== Major achievements ==
1972
8th Overall Vuelta a España
1973
4th Overall Vuelta a España
4th Overall Giro d'Italia
1976
1st Overall Vuelta a España
1st 1 stage Tour de Suisse
1977
8th Overall Vuelta a España
1978
2nd Overall Vuelta a España
