= Gary Clively =

Australian racing cyclist

Garry Clively
Personal information
- Full name: Garry Clively
- Born: 24 July 1955 (age 71) Brisbane, Queensland, Australia

Cycling career
- Sport: Cycling
- Role: Rider

Professional team
- 1975–1977: Magniflex

Major wins
- One day races and Classics National Road Race Championships (1989)

Garry Clively (born 24 July 1955) is a former Australian racing cyclist. He won the Australian national road race title in 1989 and finished 7th in the 1977 Vuelta a España.

== Major results ==
1975
8th Coppa Ugo Agostoni
1976
2nd Gran Premio Città di Camaiore
7th Trofeo Laigueglia
7th Trofeo Pantalica
8th Overall Setmana Catalana de Ciclisme
1977
7th Overall Vuelta a España
1989
1st Road race, National Road Championships

=== Grand Tour general classification results timeline ===
| Grand Tour | 1976 | 1977 |
|---|---|---|
| / Vuelta a España | — | 7 |
| Giro d'Italia | 44 | — |
| Tour de France | — | — |

Legend
| — | Did not compete |
| DNF | Did not finish |
