= Jean-Pierre Baert =

Belgian cyclist

Personal information
- Born: 29 November 1951 (age 74) Wetteren, Belgium

Cycling career
- Sport: Cycling
- Role: Rider

Jean-Pierre Baert (born 29 November 1951) is a Belgian former professional racing cyclist. He rode in the 1976 Tour de France.
