= Daniele Tinchella =

Italian cyclist

Personal information
- Born: 14 August 1952 (age 74)

Cycling career
- Sport: Cycling
- Role: Rider

Daniele Tinchella (born 14 August 1952) is a retired Italian racing cyclist. He won stage 22 of the 1976 Giro d'Italia.
