= Luis Alberto Ordiales =

Spanish cyclist

Personal information
- Full name: Luis Alberto Ordiales Meana
- Born: 15 January 1952 (age 74) Noreña, Spain

Cycling career
- Sport: Cycling
- Discipline: Road
- Role: Rider
- Rider type: Sprinter

Professional teams
- 1976–1977: Novostil–Transmallorca
- 1978–1979: Transmallorca–Flavia
- 1980: Henninger–Aquila Rossa–Zeus

Luis Alberto Ordiales Meana (born 15 January 1952) is a Spanish former road cyclist. He most notably won a stage of the 1977 Vuelta a España.

== Major results ==
1975
2nd GP Villafranca de Ordizia
1976
1st Gran Premio de Llodio
1st Stage 5 Vuelta Asturias
1st Stage 5a Vuelta a Aragón
2nd Gran Premio de Valencia
1977
1st Stage 17 Vuelta a España
1st Stage 2 Vuelta a los Valles Mineros
2nd GP Viscaya
9th Overall Vuelta a Cantabria

1st Stages 1 & 4a

1978
1st Overall Vuelta a Segovia

1st Stage 3

1st Stage 2 Vuelta a La Rioja
1st Stage 4a Vuelta a Cantabria
2nd Road race, National Road Championships
3rd Memorial Francisco Ferrer
1979
1st Stage 5a Vuelta Asturias
2nd Memorial Francisco Ferrer
