= José Viejo =

Spanish cyclist

José Luis Viejo
Personal information
- Full name: José Luis Viejo Gómez
- Born: 2 November 1949 Azuqueca de Henares, Spain
- Died: 16 November 2014 (aged 65)

Cycling career
- Sport: Cycling
- Current team: Retired
- Discipline: Road
- Role: Rider

Major wins
- 1 stage 1976 Tour de France
Medal record
Representing Spain
Men's road bicycle racing
World Championships
Bronze medal – third place	1971 Mendrisio	Amateur's Road Race

José Luis Viejo Gómez (2 November 1949 – 16 November 2014) was a Spanish road cyclist who was professional from 1973 to 1982. He represented his native country at the 1972 Summer Olympics in Munich, West Germany, where he finished in 37th place in the men's individual road race. Viejo won the 11th stage of the 1976 Tour de France with a time difference of 22 minutes and 50 seconds to the second-placed cyclist; this is the largest lead in the Tour de France after the Second World War. He also won the Tour de Pologne 1972.

== Major results ==
1971
Vuelta Ciclista a Navarra
1972
Memorial Valenciaga
Tour de Pologne
1976
Tour de France:

Winner stage 11

1977
Trofeo Masferrer
1978
Trofeo Elola
1980
Clasica de Sabiñanigo
1981
Costa del Azahar
1982
Guedalajara
