= Fedor den Hertog =

Dutch cyclist (1946–2011)

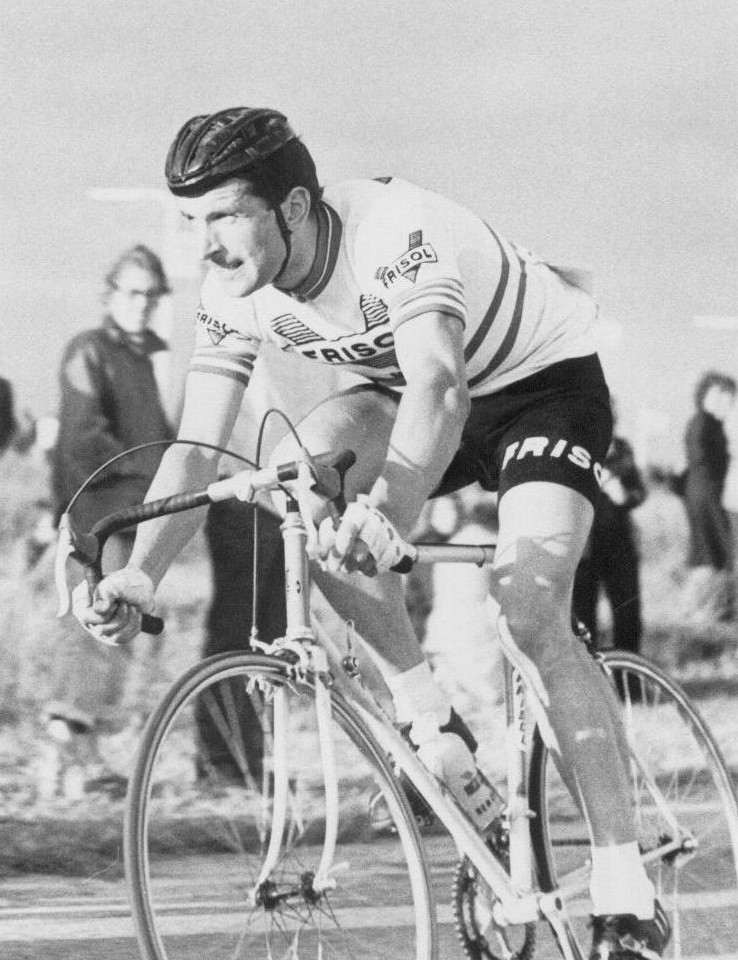

Personal information
- Full name: Fedor den Hertog
- Born: 20 April 1946 Utrecht, Netherlands
- Died: 12 February 2011 (aged 64) Ermelo, Netherlands
- Height: 1.83 m (6 ft 0 in)
- Weight: 76 kg (168 lb)

Cycling career
- Sport: Cycling
- Current team: Retired
- Discipline: Road
- Role: Rider
Medal record
Representing the Netherlands
Men's road bicycle racing
Olympic Games
Gold medal – first place	1968 Mexico City	Team time trial

Fedor Iwan den Hertog (20 April 1946 – 12 February 2011) was a Dutch racing cyclist. His sporting career began with De IJsselstreek Wezep. He won the Olympic 100 km team time trial in 1968 with Joop Zoetemelk, René Pijnen and Jan Krekels. He also won the national road championship in 1977.

== Biography ==
Hertog was born to a Dutch father and Russian mother. As an amateur, he won the British Milk Race in 1969 and 1971. His most outstanding performance was the Rheinland-Pfalz tour in Germany in 1969, when he won nine of 11 stages and overall, 36 minutes ahead of the field. He was national road champion in 1968 and pursuit champion in 1968 and 1971. He came third in the Olympic team time trial in 1972, but the team was disqualified for a doping offense. In 1969 and 1970, Hertog won the Grand Prix des Nations, and in 1969 won the Tour of Belgium. An accident with a car in the Belgian Ardennes on 17 August 1967 came close to ending his career. Den Hertog was considered the best amateur of his time, and many professional teams wanted him, but he declined out of fear to lose his freedom.

In 1974, Den Hertog finally turned professional but he had passed his peak. He first rode the Tour de France in 1974. He rode three times for the Dutch team, Frisol, coming 27th, 18th and then not finishing, although in 1977 he won the stage to Rouen. He broke away from the field 21 km from the finish and won by 20 seconds. He dropped out with knee pain in the 13th stage. He also rode for Lejeune-BP and the Belgian team, IJsboerke-Warncke Eis, but never with the success he had as an amateur.

He won a stage in the Vuelta a España in 1977 but retired soon afterwards. He opened a bicycle business in Dilsen in Belgium but closed it for "personal circumstances". In 2007, he was diagnosed with prostate cancer, from which he died in February 2011.

His brother, Nidi, was a professional cyclist from 1974 to 1980.

== Major results ==
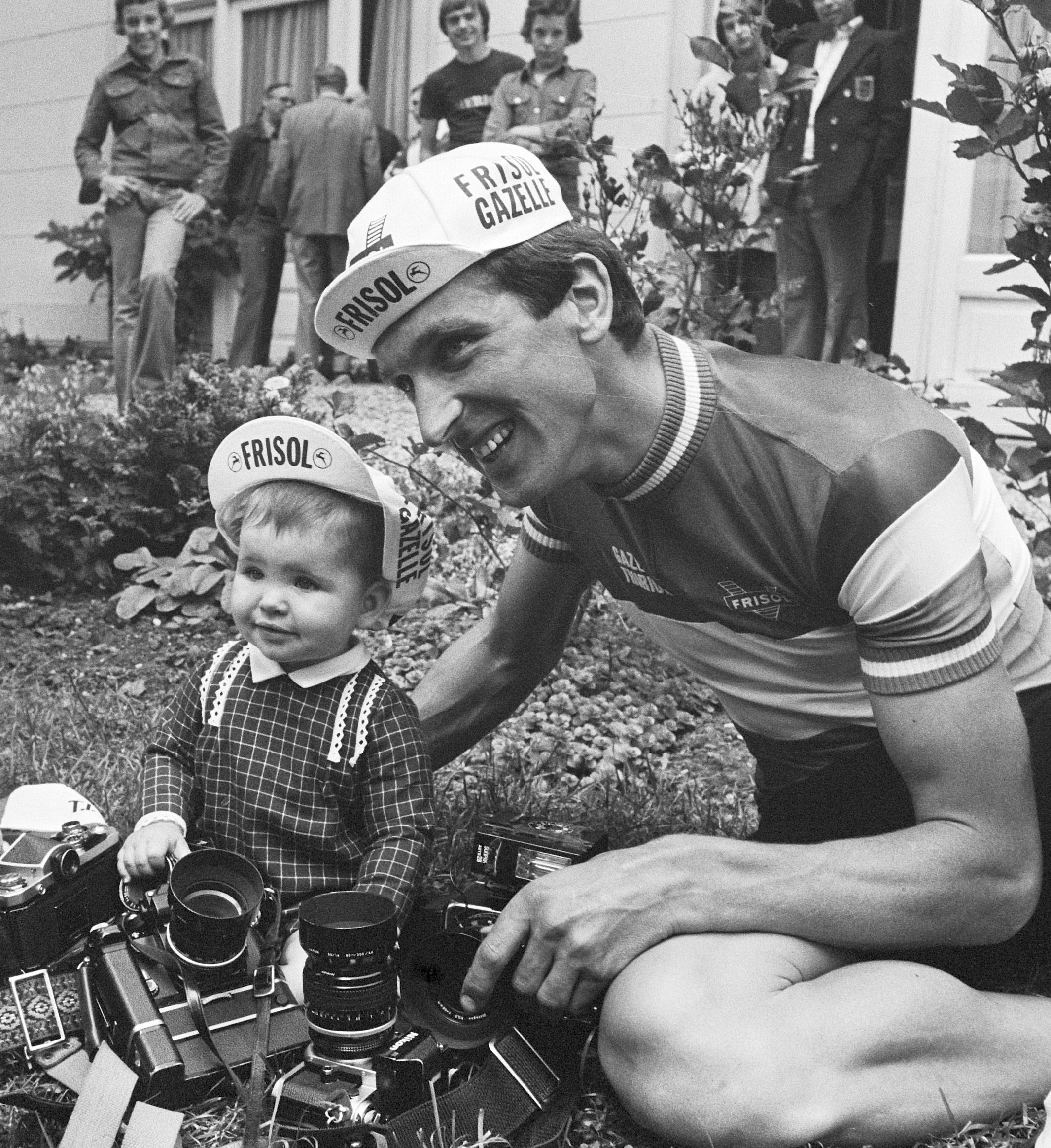
Fedor den Hertog with daughter in 1977

1966
Netherlands National Militaries Road Championship
1968
Netherlands National Amateur Track Pursuit Championship
(gold) Olympic Games Team Time Trial (with Jan Krekels, René Pijnen and Joop Zoetemelk)
1969
Milk Race
Rheinland-Pfalz Rundfahrt
1970
Omloop der Kempen
Ronde van Limburg
1971
Milk Race
Netherlands National Amateur Track Pursuit Championship
1972
Tour de l'Avenir
1st Overall DDR Rundfahrt
1973
Olympia's Tour
1976
Ronde van Midden-Zeeland
1977
Liedekerkse Pijl
(Netherlands) Dutch National Road Race Championship
Schijndel
Trofee Jan van Erp
Tour de France:

Winner stage 10

Vuelta a España:

Winner stage 3

1979
GP Frans Verbeeck
1980
Maaslandse Pijl

== See also ==
- List of Dutch Olympic cyclists

Sporting positions
Preceded by Jan Raas	Dutch National Road Race Champion; 1977	Succeeded by Henk Lubberding
