= Benny Schepmans =

Belgian cyclist

Personal information
- Born: 19 December 1953 (age 72)

Cycling career
- Sport: Cycling
- Role: Rider

Benny Schepmans (born 19 December 1953) is a Belgian racing cyclist. He rode in the 1977 Tour de France.
