= José Nazabal =

Spanish cyclist

Personal information
- Full name: José Nazábal Mimendia
- Born: July 1, 1951 (age 75) Zaldivia, Spain

Cycling career
- Sport: Cycling
- Current team: Retired
- Discipline: Road
- Role: Rider

José Nazábal Mimendia (born 1 July 1951) is a Spanish former professional road bicycle racer.

He was born at Zaldivia. In 1977, Nazabal won a stage in both the Vuelta a España and in the Tour de France.

== Major results ==
- 1976
  - GP Navarra
- 1977
  - Vuelta a España: Winner stage 18
  - Vuelta a Aragón
  - Tour de France: Winner stage 3

== See also ==
- List of doping cases in cycling
