= Frisol (cycling team) =

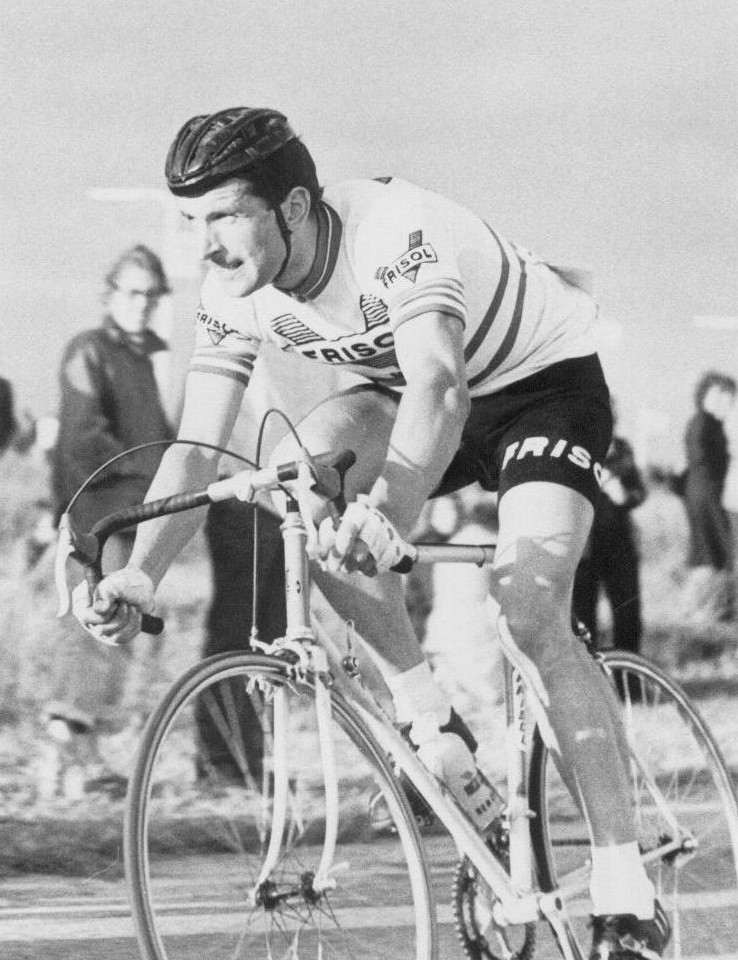
- Fedor den Hertog in 1979

Team information
- Registered: Netherlands
- Founded: 1973
- Disbanded: 1977
- Discipline: Road
- Bicycles: Gazelle

Team name history
- 1973 1974 1975 1976 1977: Frisol; Frisol–Flair Plastics; Frisol–G.B.C. Frisol–Gazelle; Frisol–Thirion–Gazelle

Frisol was a Dutch professional cycling team that existed from 1973 to 1977. Its main sponsor was Dutch oil trader Frisol. Its most notable victory was Jan Raas's win of the 1977 Milan–San Remo.
