= Alain Desaever =

Belgian cyclist

Personal information
- Born: 3 October 1952 Nieuwpoort, Belgium
- Died: 6 June 2014 (aged 61) Roeselare, Belgium

Cycling career
- Sport: Cycling
- Role: Rider

Alain Desaever (3 October 1952 – 6 June 2014) was a Belgian racing cyclist. He rode in the 1979 and 1980 Tour de France.
