= 2002 Volta a Portugal =

Race details
- Dates: August 2–15, 2002
- Stages: 13
- Distance: 1,951.5 km (1,212.6 mi)
- Winning time: 47h 51' 33"

Results
Jersey awarded to the overall winner	Winner	Claus Michael Møller (DEN)	(Milaneza–MSS)
	Second	Joan Horrach (ESP)	(Milaneza–MSS)
	Third	Rui Sousa (POR)	(Milaneza–MSS)
Jersey awarded to the points classification winner	Points	Ángel Edo (ESP)	(Milaneza–MSS)
Jersey awarded to the mountains classification winner	Mountains	Gonçalo Amorim (POR)	(Milaneza–MSS)
Jersey awarded to the sprints classification winner	Sprints	Hélder Lopes (POR)	(Porta da Ravessa–Zurich)
	Team	Milaneza–MSS	

The 64th Volta a Portugal/PT Comunicações was a men's road bicycle race held from 2 August to 15 August 2002. The race, rated as a 2.2 event, started with a team time trial in Maia and finished in Sintra.

Møller (3rd) going into the final-stage time trial had to overcome a 48-second lead held by teammate Horrach to win the overall classification and, alongside Rui Sousa, complete an all Milaneza–MSS podium.

== Teams ==
The 16 teams invited to the race were:

Trade Team I teams

- BigMat–Auber 93
- iBanesto.com
- Kelme–Costa Blanca
- Lampre–Daikin
- Milaneza–MSS
- Team Coast

Trade Team II teams

- Barbot–Torrie
- Carvalhelhos–Boavista
- CCC–Polsat
- LA Alumínios–Pecol–Bombarral
- Porta da Ravessa–Zurich
- Cantanhede–Marquês de Marialva
- Matesica–Abóboda

Trade Team III teams

- ASC–Vila do Conde
- Paredes Rota dos Móveis–Antarte VIP
- Pepolim & Irmãos–Ovarense

== Stages ==
Stage characteristics and winners
Stage	Date	Course	Distance	Type	Winner
1	2 August	Maia	11.7 km (7 mi)	Team time trial	iBanesto.com
2	3 August	Fafe	172.9 km (107 mi)	Flat stage	Ángel Edo (ESP)
3	4 August	Vila Nova de Gaia	169.2 km (105 mi)	Flat stage	Cândido Barbosa (POR)
4	5 August	Penafiel to Favaios	166.4 km (103 mi)	Hilly stage	Aitor Osa (ESP)
5	6 August	Alijó to Alto da Senhora da Graça	162.2 km (101 mi)	Mountain stage	Joan Horrach (ESP)
	7 August	Municipality of Mondim de Basto		Rest day	
6	8 August	Mondim de Basto to Cantanhede	205.2 km (128 mi)	Hilly stage	Cândido Barbosa (POR)
7	9 August	Cantanhede to Alcobaça	182.7 km (114 mi)	Flat stage	David Muñoz (ESP)
8	10 August	Gândara to Castelo Branco	181.1 km (113 mi)	Flat stage	Alexis Rodríguez (ESP)
9	11 August	Belmonte to Torre	181 km (112 mi)	Mountain stage	Claus Michael Møller (DEN)
10	12 August	Covilhã to Portalegre	161.5 km (100 mi)	Medium mountain	Danail Petrov (BUL)
11	13 August	Portalegre to Elvas	154.3 km (96 mi)	Flat stage	Joan Horrach (ESP)
12	14 August	Elvas to Beja	179.4 km (111 mi)	Flat stage	Ángel Edo (ESP)
13	15 August	Queluz to Sintra	23.9 km (15 mi)	Individual time trial	Claus Michael Møller (DEN)
	Total		1,951.5 km (1,213 mi)		

== Classification leadership ==
Classification leadership by stage
Stage	Winner	General classification	Points classification	Mountains classification	Sprints rider classification	Team classification
1	iBanesto.com	Adolfo García	no award	no award	no award	iBanesto.com
2	Ángel Edo	Cândido Barbosa	Ángel Edo	Pedro Cardoso	Rui Pinto	iBanesto.com
3	Cândido Barbosa	Cândido Barbosa	Cândido Barbosa	Alexis Rodríguez	Célio Sousa	iBanesto.com
4	Aitor Osa	Cândido Barbosa	Cândido Barbosa	Gonçalo Amorim	Célio Sousa	iBanesto.com
5	Joan Horrach	Joan Horrach	Cândido Barbosa	Gonçalo Amorim	Célio Sousa	Milaneza–MSS
6	Cândido Barbosa	Joan Horrach	Cândido Barbosa	Gonçalo Amorim	Célio Sousa	Milaneza–MSS
7	David Muñoz	Joan Horrach	Cândido Barbosa	Gonçalo Amorim	Eduardo González	Milaneza–MSS
8	Alexis Rodríguez	Joan Horrach	Cândido Barbosa	Gonçalo Amorim	Fernando Citoula	iBanesto.com
9	Claus Michael Møller	Joan Horrach	Cândido Barbosa	Gonçalo Amorim	Fernando Citoula	Milaneza–MSS
10	Danail Petrov	Joan Horrach	Cândido Barbosa	Gonçalo Amorim	Fernando Citoula	Milaneza–MSS
11	Joan Horrach	Joan Horrach	Joan Horrach	Gonçalo Amorim	Fernando Citoula	Milaneza–MSS
12	Ángel Edo	Joan Horrach	Ángel Edo	Gonçalo Amorim	Hélder Lopes	Milaneza–MSS
13	Claus Michael Møller	Claus Michael Møller	Ángel Edo	Gonçalo Amorim	Hélder Lopes	Milaneza–MSS
Final		Claus Michael Møller	Ángel Edo	Gonçalo Amorim	Hélder Lopes	Milaneza–MSS

== Final standings ==
Legend
General classification	Denotes the winner of the general classification	Points classification	Denotes the leader of the points classification
Mountains classification	Denotes the leader of the mountains classification	A white jersey	Denotes the winner of the intermediate sprints classification

=== General classification ===
Final general classification (1–10)
Rank	Rider	Team	Time
1	Claus Michael Møller (DEN)	Milaneza–MSS	47h 51' 33"
2	Joan Horrach (ESP)	Milaneza–MSS	+ 0' 05"
3	Rui Sousa (POR)	Milaneza–MSS	+ 1' 28"
4	Pedro Arreitunandia (ESP)	Carvalhelhos–Boavista	+ 2' 04"
5	David Bernabeu (ESP)	Carvalhelhos–Boavista	+ 3' 13"
6	Andrei Zintchenko (RUS)	LA Alumínios–Pecol–Bombarral	+ 4' 10"
7	Félix García Casas (ESP)	BigMat–Auber 93	+ 4' 57"
8	Adolfo García (ESP)	iBanesto.com	+ 4' 57"
9	Nuno Ribeiro (POR)	Barbot–Torrie	+ 5' 38"
10	Bruno Castanheira (POR)	LA Alumínios–Pecol–Bombarral	+ 5' 39"

Final general classification (11–111)
Rank	Rider	Team	Time
11	Joaquim Gomes (POR)	Carvalhelhos–Boavista	+ 6' 32"
12	Danail Petrov (BUL)	Porta da Ravessa–Zurich	+ 6' 48"
13	Nuno Alves (POR)	Barbot–Torrie	+ 7' 08"
14	Carlos Pinto (POR)	Barbot–Torrie	+ 7' 15"
15	Francisco Pérez (ESP)	Porta da Ravessa–Zurich	+ 7' 21"
16	Koldo Gil (ESP)	iBanesto.com	+ 8' 19"
17	Ezequiel Mosquera (ESP)	Paredes Rota dos Móveis–Antarte VIP	+ 9' 02"
18	David Navas (ESP)	iBanesto.com	+ 9' 05"
19	Joaquim Andrade (POR)	Cantanhede–Marquês de Marialva	+ 9' 07"
20	Virgílio Santos (POR)	Paredes Rota dos Móveis–Antarte VIP	+ 9' 45"
21	David Blanco (ESP)	ASC–Vila do Conde	+ 11' 13"
22	Josep Jufré (ESP)	Carvalhelhos–Boavista	+ 12' 44"
23	Eligio Requejo (ESP)	ASC–Vila do Conde	+ 13' 36"
24	Pedro Martins (POR)	Porta da Ravessa–Zurich	+ 14' 09"
25	Gustavo Otero (ESP)	Kelme–Costa Blanca	+ 15' 35"
26	Rui Lavarinhas (POR)	Milaneza–MSS	+ 16' 12"
27	Pedro Cardoso (POR)	Milaneza–MSS	+ 17' 58"
28	David García (ESP)	Cantanhede–Marquês de Marialva	+ 19' 05"
29	Pedro Lopes (POR)	LA Alumínios–Pecol–Bombarral	+ 22' 18"
30	Joaquim Sampaio (POR)	Carvalhelhos–Boavista	+ 22' 24"
31	José Rodrigues (POR)	Carvalhelhos–Boavista	+ 22' 31"
32	Gonçalo Amorim (POR)	Milaneza–MSS	+ 23' 34"
33	Joaquín López (ESP)	Kelme–Costa Blanca	+ 24' 17"
34	Pedro Andrade (POR)	LA Alumínios–Pecol–Bombarral	+ 24' 25"
35	Aitor Kintana (ESP)	BigMat–Auber 93	+ 29' 12"
36	Quintino Rodrigues (POR)	CCC–Polsat	+ 30' 54"
37	Krassimir Vassiliev (BUL)	Porta da Ravessa–Zurich	+ 31' 04"
38	Francisco Javier Vila (ESP)	iBanesto.com	+ 32' 09"
39	Domingo Segado (ESP)	Porta da Ravessa–Zurich	+ 32' 17"
40	David Plaza (ESP)	Team Coast	+ 32' 43"
41	Segis de la Torre (ESP)	Pepolim & Irmãos–Ovarense	+ 33' 09"
42	Paulo Ferreira (POR)	Cantanhede–Marquês de Marialva	+ 34' 02"
43	Orlando Rodrigues (POR)	LA Alumínios–Pecol–Bombarral	+ 34' 11"
44	Hugo Sabido (POR)	Porta da Ravessa–Zurich	+ 34' 38"
45	Cândido Barbosa (POR)	LA Alumínios–Pecol–Bombarral	+ 34' 58"
46	Jorge Nogaledo (ESP)	Paredes Rota dos Móveis–Antarte VIP	+ 35' 36"
47	Lizuarte Martins (POR)	Matesica–Abóboda	+ 36' 16"
48	Pablo Lastras (ESP)	iBanesto.com	+ 36' 23"
49	Rubén Galván (ESP)	ASC–Vila do Conde	+ 36' 24"
50	Arnoldas Saprykinas (LTU)	Cantanhede–Marquês de Marialva	+ 37' 02"
51	David Muñoz (ESP)	Kelme–Costa Blanca	+ 37' 12"
52	Francisco Morales (ESP)	Matesica–Abóboda	+ 38' 30"
53	Sascha Henrix (GER)	Team Coast	+ 38' 40"
54	Nélson Vitorino (POR)	Cantanhede–Marquês de Marialva	+ 38' 44"
55	Atanas Petrov (BUL)	Carvalhelhos–Boavista	+ 39' 20"
56	Xabier Zandio (ESP)	iBanesto.com	+ 40' 51"
57	Stéphane Heulot (FRA)	BigMat–Auber 93	+ 41' 16"
58	Pedro Hermida (ESP)	Pepolim & Irmãos–Ovarense	+ 41' 30"
59	Javier Gilmartín (ESP)	Pepolim & Irmãos–Ovarense	+ 44' 53"
60	Unai Yus (ESP)	Cantanhede–Marquês de Marialva	+ 45' 47"
61	Célio Sousa (POR)	Paredes Rota dos Móveis–Antarte VIP	+ 46' 14"
62	Tomasz Brozyna (POL)	iBanesto.com	+ 46' 31"
63	Claudio Faria (POR)	Barbot–Torrie	+ 47' 21"
64	Ángel Edo (ESP)	Milaneza–MSS	+ 47' 42"
65	Ricardo Felgueiras (POR)	Carvalhelhos–Boavista	+ 48' 17"
66	Jaime Hernández (ESP)	Team Coast	+ 48' 32"
67	Juan Manuel Gárate (ESP)	Lampre–Daikin	+ 49' 31"
68	Alexis Rodríguez (ESP)	Kelme–Costa Blanca	+ 49' 52"
69	Rafael Fernández (ESP)	ASC–Vila do Conde	+ 50' 07"
70	Daniel Becke (GER)	Team Coast	+ 50' 25"
71	Saulius Šarkauskas (LTU)	Cantanhede–Marquês de Marialva	+ 50' 50"
72	Óscar Serrano (ESP)	ASC–Vila do Conde	+ 51' 29"
73	Sergio Barbero (ITA)	Lampre–Daikin	+ 52' 24"
74	Ángel Casero (ESP)	Team Coast	+ 52' 44"
75	Alexei Sivakov (RUS)	BigMat–Auber 93	+ 53' 32"
76	Paulo Barroso (POR)	Milaneza–MSS	+ 55' 03"
77	Luis Pérez (ESP)	Team Coast	+ 57' 53"
78	Julián Fernández (ESP)	Pepolim & Irmãos–Ovarense	+ 57' 57"
79	José Guillén (ESP)	Pepolim & Irmãos–Ovarense	+ 58' 11"
80	Massimo Codol (ITA)	Lampre–Daikin	+ 58' 22"
81	Hélder Lopes (POR)	Porta da Ravessa–Zurich	+ 59' 26"
82	Alexandre Pinho (POR)	Matesica–Abóboda	+ 59' 35"
83	Xavier Jan (FRA)	BigMat–Auber 93	+ 1h 00' 30"
84	Simone Bertoletti (ITA)	Lampre–Daikin	+ 1h 00' 37"
85	Sébastien Talabardon (FRA)	BigMat–Auber 93	+ 1h 01' 47"
86	Andrei Teteriouk (KAZ)	CCC–Polsat	+ 1h 02' 04"
87	César Quitério (POR)	Paredes Rota dos Móveis–Antarte VIP	+ 1h 03' 03"
88	Jon Odriozola (ESP)	iBanesto.com	+ 1h 03' 34"
89	Ondrej Sosenka (CZE)	CCC–Polsat	+ 1h 04' 59"
90	Thorsten Rund (GER)	Team Coast	+ 1h 06' 25"
91	Eduardo González (ESP)	Barbot–Torrie	+ 1h 06' 57"
92	Rubén Oliveira (ESP)	Paredes Rota dos Móveis–Antarte VIP	+ 1h 07' 01"
93	José Rosa (POR)	LA Alumínios–Pecol–Bombarral	+ 1h 07' 06"
94	Rafael Milá (ESP)	ASC–Vila do Conde	+ 1h 09' 42"
95	Nuno Marta (POR)	Barbot–Torrie	+ 1h 11' 57"
96	Hélder Silva (POR)	Cantanhede–Marquês de Marialva	+ 1h 12' 17"
97	Marco Morais (POR)	Barbot–Torrie	+ 1h 12' 26"
98	Ricardo Costa (POR)	Porta da Ravessa–Zurich	+ 1h 13' 16"
99	Fernando Citoula (ESP)	Paredes Rota dos Móveis–Antarte VIP	+ 1h 13' 28"
100	Juan Cuenca (ESP)	Kelme–Costa Blanca	+ 1h 14' 35"
101	Anton Chantyr (RUS)	Team Coast	+ 1h 15' 08"
102	Antonio Berasategui (ESP)	Matesica–Abóboda	+ 1h 20' 58"
103	Rubén Oarbeaskoa (ESP)	LA Alumínios–Pecol–Bombarral	+ 1h 26' 28"
104	Luís Sarreira (POR)	Cantanhede–Marquês de Marialva	+ 1h 27' 24"
105	Marc Soares (POR)	Pepolim & Irmãos–Ovarense	+ 1h 30' 46"
106	Eric Pascal (FRA)	Matesica–Abóboda	+ 1h 31' 13"
107	Pedro Costa (POR)	Barbot–Torrie	+ 1h 32' 26"
108	Juan de Dios (ESP)	Matesica–Abóboda	+ 1h 40' 15"
109	Cyril Saugrain (FRA)	BigMat–Auber 93	+ 1h 46' 13"
110	Jeremy Hunt (GBR)	BigMat–Auber 93	+ 1h 49' 36"
111	Gaizka Lejarreta (ESP)	LA Alumínios–Pecol–Bombarral	+ 1h 50' 51"

=== Points classification ===
Final points classification (1–10)
Rank	Rider	Team	Points
1	Ángel Edo (ESP)	Milaneza–MSS	112
2	Cândido Barbosa (POR)	LA Alumínios–Pecol–Bombarral	104
3	Joan Horrach (ESP)	Milaneza–MSS	104
4	Rui Sousa (POR)	Milaneza–MSS	65
5	Claus Michael Møller (DEN)	Milaneza–MSS	59
6	Josep Jufré (ESP)	Carvalhelhos–Boavista	51
7	Rubén Galván (ESP)	ASC–Vila do Conde	46
8	César Quitério (POR)	Paredes Rota dos Móveis–Antarte VIP	41
9	David Muñoz (ESP)	Kelme–Costa Blanca	33
10	Danail Petrov (BUL)	Porta da Ravessa–Zurich	30

=== Mountains classification ===
Final mountains classification (1–10)
Rank	Rider	Team	Points
1	Gonçalo Amorim (POR)	Milaneza–MSS	76
2	Rui Sousa (POR)	Milaneza–MSS	69
3	Joan Horrach (ESP)	Milaneza–MSS	59
4	Pedro Arreitunandia (ESP)	Carvalhelhos–Boavista	45
5	Segis de la Torre (ESP)	Pepolim & Irmãos–Ovarense	43
6	Hugo Sabido (POR)	Porta da Ravessa–Zurich	42
7	Claus Michael Møller (DEN)	Milaneza–MSS	31
8	Krassimir Vassiliev (BUL)	Porta da Ravessa–Zurich	31
9	Luis Pérez (ESP)	Team Coast	29
10	David Muñoz (ESP)	Kelme–Costa Blanca	27

=== Sprints classification ===
Final sprints classification (1–10)
Rank	Rider	Team	Time
1	Hélder Lopes (POR)	Porta da Ravessa–Zurich	19
2	Fernando Citoula (ESP)	Paredes Rota dos Móveis–Antarte VIP	18
3	Claudio Faria (POR)	Barbot–Torrie	15
4	Hugo Sabido (POR)	Porta da Ravessa–Zurich	13
5	Eduardo González (ESP)	Barbot–Torrie	12
6	Célio Sousa (POR)	Paredes Rota dos Móveis–Antarte VIP	12
7	Julián Fernández (ESP)	Pepolim & Irmãos–Ovarense	11
8	Alexis Rodríguez (ESP)	Kelme–Costa Blanca	7
9	Luís Sarreira (POR)	Cantanhede–Marquês de Marialva	6
10	Krassimir Vassiliev (BUL)	Porta da Ravessa–Zurich	5

=== Team classification ===
Final team classification (1–10)
Rank	Team	Time
1	Milaneza–MSS	43h 36' 57"
2	Carvalhelhos–Boavista	+ 9' 22"
3	iBanesto.com	+ 12' 40"
4	LA Alumínios–Pecol–Bombarral	+ 15' 18"
5	Barbot–Torrie	+ 16' 27"
6	Porta da Ravessa–Zurich	+ 24' 58"
7	Cantanhede–Marquês de Marialva	+ 40' 59"
8	Paredes Rota dos Móveis–Antarte VIP	+ 42' 09"
9	ASC–Vila do Conde	+ 42' 55"
10	Kelme–Costa Blanca	+ 43' 19"
