= Porto–Lisboa =

Race details
- Date: June 10
- Region: Portugal
- English name: OPorto–Lisbon
- Local name(s): Porto–Lisboa (in Portuguese)
- Discipline: Road race
- Competition: Classic race
- Type: Single-day
- Organiser: UVP-FPC

History
- First edition: 1911
- Editions: 74
- Final edition: 2004
- First winner: Charles George (FRA)
- Most wins: 3 times: João Francisco (POR); José Maria Nicolau (POR); Fernando Mendes (POR); Alexandre Ruas (POR)
- Final winner: Pedro Soeiro (POR)

Porto–Lisbon (Portuguese: Porto–Lisboa) was an annual road cycling race held in Portugal on 10 June in celebration of Portugal Day. Covering a distance of approximately 330-340 kilometres, the race was the longest on the professional calendar after the disappearance of Bordeaux–Paris in 1988. It started in Porto, Portugal's second-largest city, and finished in the Portuguese capital Lisbon around eight or nine hours later.

Although it was the most important classic in Portugal, in its later days it was usually only contested by Portuguese cycling teams. In 2002 Porto–Lisbon was held as a team-race divided in three sectors between Porto and Lisboa. In 2004 the last edition of the race was held. Since its cancellation, Milan–San Remo is the longest one-day race of the year, at approximately 298 km.

Porto–Lisboa map

== Winners ==
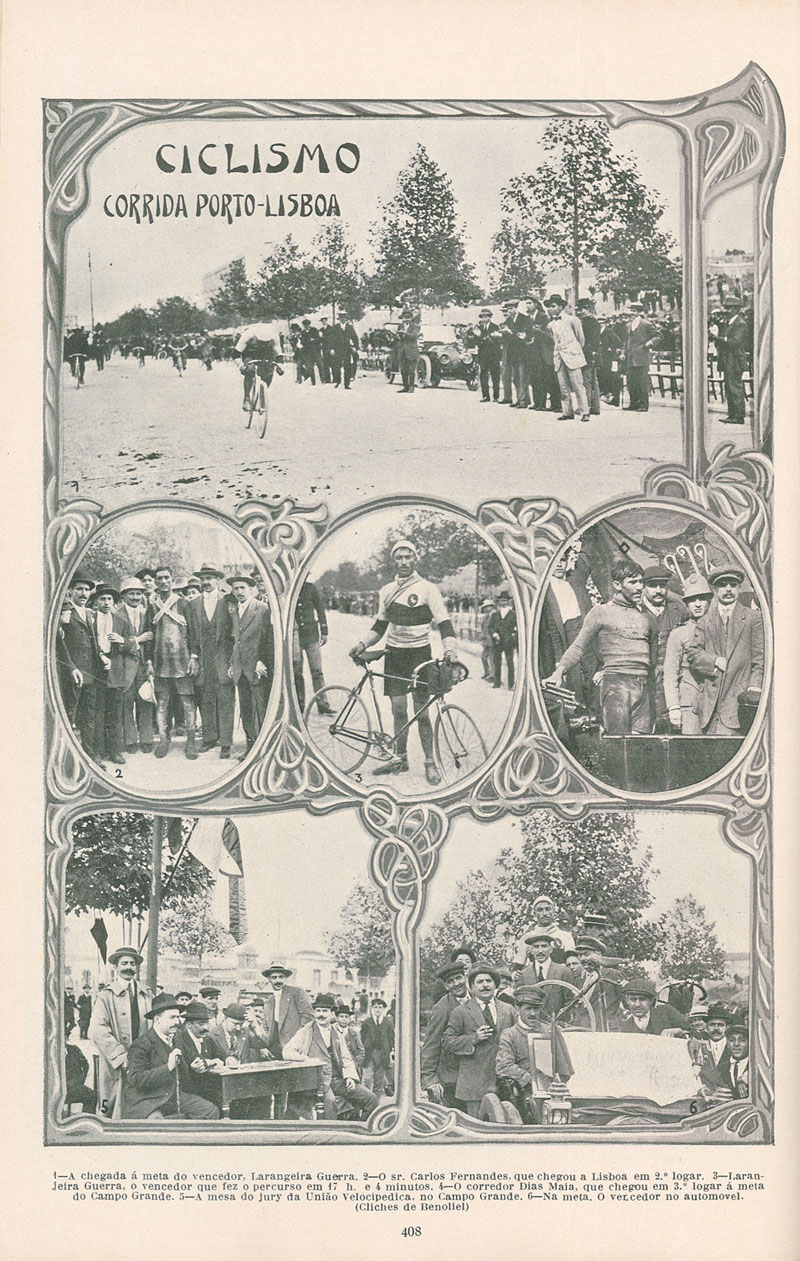
Illustração Portugueza (1912)

Year	Country	Rider	Team
1911	France	Charles George	Lusitano
1912	Portugal	Laranjeira Guerra	Sporting Clube de Portugal
1913	Portugal	Joaquim Dias Maia	Sporting Clube de Portugal
1923	Portugal	José Conceição	Bombarralense
1924	Portugal	José Conceição	Bombarralense
1925	Portugal	Anibal Carreto	Individual
1926	Portugal	Anibal Carreto	Individual
1927	Portugal	João Francisco	Campo de Ourique
1928	Portugal	João Francisco	Campo de Ourique
1932	Portugal	José Maria Nicolau	SL Benfica
1933	Portugal	João Francisco	Campo de Ourique
1934	Portugal	José Maria Nicolau	SL Benfica
1935	Portugal	José Maria Nicolau	SL Benfica
1936	Portugal	Alfredo Trindade	Sporting Clube de Portugal
1937	Portugal	José Brás Júnior	Campo de Ourique
1938	Portugal	Filipe Melo	Sporting Clube de Portugal
1939	Portugal	Ildefonso Rodrigues	Sporting Clube de Portugal
1940	Portugal	Alfredo Oliveira	SL Benfica
1941	Portugal	Francisco Inácio	Sporting Clube de Portugal
1942	Portugal	Eduardo Lopes	Iluminante
1949	Portugal	Fernando Moreira	FC Porto
1951	Portugal	Amândio Cardoso	FC Porto
1952	Portugal	Luciano Moreira de Sá	FC Porto
1953	Portugal	Luciano Moreira de Sá	FC Porto
1954	Portugal	Américo Raposo	Sporting Clube de Portugal
1956	Portugal	Fernando Henriques Silva	Sangalhos
1957	Portugal	Sousa Santos	FC Porto
1958	Portugal	Carlos Carvalho	FC Porto
1959	Portugal	Mário Sá	FC Porto
1960	Portugal	Pedro Polainas	FC Porto
1961	Portugal	Azevedo Maia	FC Porto
1962	Portugal	Antonino Baptista	Sangalhos
1963	Portugal	João Roque	Sporting Clube de Portugal
1964	Portugal	Alcino Rodrigo	S.L. Benfica
1965	Portugal	José Pacheco	FC Porto
1966	Portugal	Joaquim Leão	FC Porto
1967	Belgium	Walter Godefroot	Flandria
1968	Belgium	Eric Leman	Flandria
1969	Portugal	Emiliano Dionísio	Sporting Clube de Portugal
1970	Portugal	Joaquim Leite	FC Porto
1971	Portugal	Fernando Mendes	SL Benfica
1972	Portugal	Fernando Mendes	SL Benfica
1973	Portugal	Fernando Mendes	SL Benfica
1974	Portugal	Leonel Miranda	Sporting Clube de Portugal
1975	Portugal	Fernando Vieira	S.L. Benfica
1976	Portugal	Venceslau Fernandes	Sangalhos
1977	Portugal	Flávio Henriques	Sangalhos
1978	Portugal	José Luís Pacheco	Lusotex
1979	Portugal	Manuel Gonçalves	Loulé
1980	Portugal	Alexandre Ruas	Coelima
1981	Portugal	José Amaro	FC Porto
1982*	Portugal	Alexandre Ruas	Lousa–Trinaranjus
1983	Portugal	Marco Chagas	Mako-Jeans
1984	Portugal	Alexandre Ruas	FC Porto
1985	Portugal	Vitor Rodrigues	Bombarralense
1986	Portugal	Carlos Santos	Lousa
1987	Portugal	Américo Neves da Silva	Sporting Clube de Portugal
1988	Portugal	José Xavier	Louletano
1989	Portugal	Fernando Valente	Torreense
1990	Portugal	Joaquim Adrego Andrade	Torreense
1991	Portugal	Paulo Pinto	Campocarne
1992	Russia	Oleg Lokvin	Feirense
1993	Portugal	Rui Bela	W52 Quintanilha
1994	Portugal	Paulo Ferreira	Sicasal–Acral
1995	Portugal	Jorge Henriques	Atum Bom Petisco–Tavira
1996	Brazil	Cássio Freitas	Recer–Boavista
1997	Portugal	Cândido Barbosa	Maia–Jumbo–Cin
1998	Bulgaria	Atanas Petrov	Gresco–Tavira–Progecer
1999	Portugal	Quintino Rodrigues	SL Benfica
2000	Spain	Melcior Mauri	SL Benfica
2001	Spain	Unai Yus	Cantanhede–Marques de Marialva
2002	Portugal	Team Event	Carvalhelhos–Boavista
2003	Portugal	Pedro Soeiro	Carvalhelhos–Boavista
2004	Portugal	Pedro Soeiro	Carvalhelhos–Boavista

* The 1982 "Porto–Lisboa" de 1982 was interrupted in Alcobaça (due to protest from the local population), and the winner of the section "Porto–Coimbra" was considered the overall winner.
