= Quintino Rodrigues =

Portuguese cyclist

Personal information
- Full name: Quintino Fernandes Rodrigues Silva
- Born: 11 January 1971 (age 55) Vila Nova de Gaia, Portugal

Cycling career
- Sport: Cycling
- Current team: Retired
- Discipline: Road
- Role: Rider

Professional teams
- 1992–1993: Philips–Etiel–Feirense
- 1994–1995: Sicasal–Acral
- 1996: Kelme–Artiach
- 1997–1998: Recer–Boavista
- 1999–2000: Benfica–Winterthur
- 2002: CCC–Polsat
- 2003: ASC–Vila do Conde
- 2004: Hoop–CCC–Polsat

Quintino Fernandes Rodrigues Silva (born 1 January 1971) is a Portuguese former road cyclist. Professional from 1992 to 2004, he notably competed in two editions of the Giro d'Italia and the Vuelta a España.

== Major results ==
1991
7th Overall Troféu Joaquim Agostinho
1992
5th Overall Troféu Joaquim Agostinho
1993
3rd Overall Troféu Joaquim Agostinho
10th Overall Volta a Portugal

1st Stage 12

1994
1st Stage 4 Tour de Pologne
4th Overall Escalada a Montjuïc
6th Overall Troféu Joaquim Agostinho
1995
1st Stage 8 Tour de Pologne
1st Stage 3 Rapport Toer
2nd Overall Volta a Portugal

1st Prologue (TTT)

3rd Overall Grande Prémio Jornal de Notícias
6th Overall Troféu Joaquim Agostinho
1996
5th GP Villafranca de Ordizia
1997
1st Stage 4b Tour du Poitou-Charentes
8th Overall Volta a Portugal
1998
9th Overall Volta ao Algarve
10th Overall Volta a Portugal
1999
1st Porto–Lisboa
2002
5th Road race, National Road Championships

=== Grand Tour general classification results timeline ===
Grand Tour	1994	1995	1996	1997	1998	1999
Giro d'Italia	—	41	78	—	—	—
Tour de France	—	—	—	—	—	—
Vuelta a España	62	—	—	—	—	70
