= Carlos Carneiro (cyclist) =

Portuguese cyclist

Personal information
- Full name: Carlos Alberto Silva Carneiro
- Born: 14 January 1970 (age 56)

Cycling career
- Sport: Cycling
- Current team: Retired
- Discipline: Road
- Role: Rider

Professional teams
- 1991: Ruquita–Philips
- 1992: Philips–Etiel–Feirense
- 1993: Imporbor–Feirense
- 1994–1995: Sicasal–Acral
- 1996–1997: Recer–Boavista
- 1998–2003: Maia–CIN
- 2004: ASC–Vila do Conde
- 2005–2006: Madeinox–AR Canelas

Major wins
- Stage races Volta ao Alentejo (1994) One-day races and Classics National Road Race Championships (1998, 1999)

Carlos Alberto Silva Carneiro (born 14 January 1970) is a Portuguese former road cyclist. Professional from 1991 to 2006, he notably won the Portuguese National Road Race Championships in 1998 and 1999 as well as the GP Costa Azul in 1991 and the Volta ao Alentejo in 1994. He also competed in the 1994, 1995 and 2001 editions of the Vuelta a España.

== Major results ==
1991
1st Overall GP Costa Azul
8th Overall Volta ao Algarve
1994
1st Overall Volta ao Alentejo

1st Stage 1

1995
1st Stage 8 Rapport Toer
1996
1st Stage 1 Volta a Portugal
1998
1st Road race, National Road Championships
1999
1st Road race, National Road Championships
