= Youri Sourkov =

Kazakhstani cyclist

Personal information
- Full name: Youri Sourkov; Kazakh: Юрий Сурков
- Born: 4 November 1970 (age 55): Alma-Ata, Kazakh SSR, Soviet Union; (now Almaty, Kazakhstan)

Cycling career
- Sport: Cycling
- Current team: Retired
- Discipline: Road
- Role: Rider

Professional teams
- 1994: Sicasal–Acral
- 1994: Jaisa–Banco Popular–Philips–Lacsa
- 1995: W52–Paredes Móvel
- 1996: Roslotto–ZG Mobili
- 1997: Paredes Móvel–W52
- 1997: Lada–CSKA–Samara
- 1998–2001: LA Alumínios–Pecol
- 2003: Carvalhelhos–Boavista

Youri Sourkov (born 4 November 1970 in Almaty) is a Kazakh former cyclist.

== Major results ==
1992
1st Overall Vuelta Ciclista de Chile
1993
1st Stages 1 & 3 Troféu Joaquim Agostinho
2nd Overall Tour du Maroc
1998
1st Stage 13 Tour of Portugal
1999
2nd Overall Gran Premio Internacional Mitsubishi MR Cortez

1st Stage 2

2000
1st Overall Troféu Joaquim Agostinho
2nd Overall Gran Premio Internacional Mitsubishi MR Cortez
2nd Overall Volta ao Alentejo

1st Stage 1
