= Joaquim Gomes (cyclist) =

Portuguese cyclist (born 1965)

Personal information
- Full name: Joaquim Augusto Gomes Oliveira
- Born: 21 November 1965 (age 60) Lisbon, Portugal

Cycling career
- Sport: Cycling
- Current team: Retired
- Discipline: Road
- Role: Rider

Professional teams
- 1986–1987: Sporting–Raposeira
- 1988: Louletano–Vale do Lobo
- 1989–1990: Sicasal–Toreensse
- 1991: Calbrita–Lousa
- 1992–1994: Recer–Boavista
- 1995: Sicasal–Acral
- 1996–2000: LA Alumínios–A.C. Malveira
- 2001–2002: Carvalhelhos–Boavista

Joaquim Augusto Gomes Oliveira (born November 21, 1965, in Lisbon) is a former road bicycle racer from Portugal. He is considered one of the best Portuguese cyclists of all time, being best known for his mountain climbing capabilities.

During his career he won two editions of Volta a Portugal (1989 and 1993), participating in 18 editions of the competition. Currently he is the director of Volta a Portugal.

== Major results ==
1987
1st Overall Grande Prémio Abimota

1st Stage 3

1st Stage 7 Grande Prémio Jornal de Notícias
1988
1st Overall Volta ao Algarve
1st Overall Volta ao Alentejo

1st Stage 6b (ITT)

1st Stage 5a Troféu Joaquim Agostinho
1st Stage 6 Grande Prémio Jornal de Notícias
3rd Overall Volta a Portugal

1st Stage 3 (TTT)

1989
1st Overall Volta a Portugal

1st Stages 10b, 15 & 19

6th Overall Troféu Joaquim Agostinho
1990
1st Overall Troféu Joaquim Agostinho
2nd Overall Volta a Portugal

1st Stages 9 & 13

1991
2nd Overall Troféu Joaquim Agostinho

1st Stage 5

2nd Overall Volta ao Algarve

1st Stage 4

3rd Road race, National Road Championships
1992
1st Overall Volta ao Algarve

1st Stage 3a

1st Stage 4 Tour du Vaucluse
1st Stage 1 Troféu Joaquim Agostinho
3rd Overall Volta a Portugal

1st Stage 8

1993
1st Overall Volta a Portugal

1st Stages 8 & 9

1st Stage 8 Vuelta del Uruguay
10th Overall Critérium du Dauphiné Libéré
1994
1st Overall Troféu Joaquim Agostinho

1st Stage 5

3rd Overall Volta a Portugal

1st Stages 10 & 14

3rd Overall Volta ao Alentejo
1995
1st Overall Grande Prémio Jornal de Notícias

1st Stage 3

1st Prologue (ITT) Volta a Portugal
1996
2nd Overall Grande Prémio Jornal de Notícias
4th Overall Volta a Portugal
1997
2nd Overall Troféu Joaquim Agostinho

1st Stage 4a (ITT)

3rd Overall Volta a Portugal
5th Overall Volta ao Algarve
1998
5th Overall Volta a Portugal
10th Overall Volta ao Alentejo
1999
4th Overall Volta ao Algarve
9th Overall Vuelta Asturias
2000
7th Overall Volta a Portugal
8th Overall G.P. Portugal Telecom
2001
5th Overall Volta a Portugal
10th Overall Troféu Joaquim Agostinho
