= Orlando Rodrigues =

Portuguese cyclist

Personal information
- Full name: Orlando Sérgio Gomes Rodrigues
- Born: 21 October 1969 (age 56) Torres Vedras, Portugal

Cycling career
- Sport: Cycling
- Current team: Retired
- Discipline: Road
- Role: Rider

Professional teams
- 1991: Calçado-Ruquita
- 1992: Sicasal–Acral
- 1993–1995: Artiach–Filipinos–Chiquilin
- 1996–2000: Banesto
- 2001–2003: LA Alumínios–Pecol–Calbrita–Casprini–Águias de Alpiarça

Managerial team
- 2007–2008: Benfica

Orlando Sergio Gomes Rodrigues (born 21 October 1969) is a Portuguese former cyclist. He rode in 14 Grand Tours.

== Career achievements ==
=== Major results ===
1989
1st Stage 4b Volta ao Algarve
4th Overall Volta ao Alentejo
1991
2nd Overall Volta a Portugal

1st Stages 14 & 16

2nd Overall GP Costa Azul
4th Overall Volta ao Algarve
1992
2nd Tour du Vaucluse
1993
1st Stage 4 Grande Prémio Jornal de Notícias
1994
1st Road race, National Road Championships
1st Overall Volta a Portugal

1st Stage 3

1st Circuito de Getxo
2nd Overall Troféu Joaquim Agostinho
1995
1st Overall Volta a Portugal

1st Stage 5

1st Overall Troféu Joaquim Agostinho
1996
3rd Road race, National Road Championships
1997
1st Stage 1 GP Mosqueteiros
10th Overall Volta a Catalunya
1998
1st Stage 5 Grande Prémio Jornal de Notícias
2nd Overall Volta a Portugal
2nd Overall Volta a Portugal
1999
2nd Road race, National Road Championships
7th Overall G.P. Portugal Telecom
8th Overall Tour of Galicia
2000
10th Overall Volta ao Algarve
2001
1st Circuito da Malveira
9th Overall Volta a Portugal
2002
1st Clássica Alcochete

=== Grand Tour general classification results timeline ===
Grand Tour	1992	1993	1994	1995	1996	1997	1998	1999	2000
Giro d'Italia	—	—	—	—	—	—	—	51	66
Tour de France	—	—	—	—	54	33	DNF	—	87
Vuelta a España	65	76	96	14	34	DNF	—	DNF	—

Legend
DSQ	Disqualified
DNF	Did not finish
