= Manuel Zeferino =

Portuguese cyclist

Personal information
- Full name: Manuel Ramos Zeferino
- Born: 23 July 1960 (age 66) Navais, Póvoa de Varzim, Portugal

Cycling career
- Sport: Cycling
- Current team: Retired
- Discipline: Road
- Role: Rider; Directeur sportif

Amateur teams
- 1980–1982: FC Porto–UBP
- 1983: Mako-Jeans

Professional teams
- 1984: Sporting–Raposeira
- 1985: Zor–Gemeaz Cusin
- 1986: Lousa–Trinaranjus–Akai
- 1987: Sporting–Vitalis
- 1988–1992: Boavista–Sportlis

Managerial teams
- 1993–1994: Recer–Boavista
- 1995–2008: Maia–Jumbo

Major wins
- Volta a Portugal (1981)

Manuel Zeferino (born 23 July 1960) is a Portuguese former racing cyclist, who competed as a professional from 1984 to 1992. He most notably won the Volta a Portugal in 1981. He rode in the 1984 Tour de France.

== Major results ==
1980
10th Overall Volta a Portugal
1981
1st Overall Volta a Portugal

1st Stages 1, 2a (TTT) & 7 (ITT)

1982
1st Overall Grande Prémio Jornal de Notícias

1st Stage 6b

3rd Overall Volta a Portugal
1984
1st Stage 2b (ITT) Volta ao Algarve
2nd Overall Volta a Portugal

1st Stage 12b (ITT)

1985
1st Stage 5 Grande Prémio Jornal de Notícias
4th Overall Volta a Portugal

1st Stage 13b

1986
1st Overall Volta ao Alentejo

1st Stages 1 (TTT) & 3b (ITT)

1st Overall GP Costa Azul

1st Stage 3

7th Overall Volta a Portugal
1989
1st Overall Grande Prémio Correio da Manhã

1st Stage 1

3rd Overall Volta ao Algarve
4th Overall Volta a Portugal
1990
8th Overall Volta a Portugal
1992
2nd Overall GP Costa Azul
