= Marco Chagas =

Portuguese cyclist

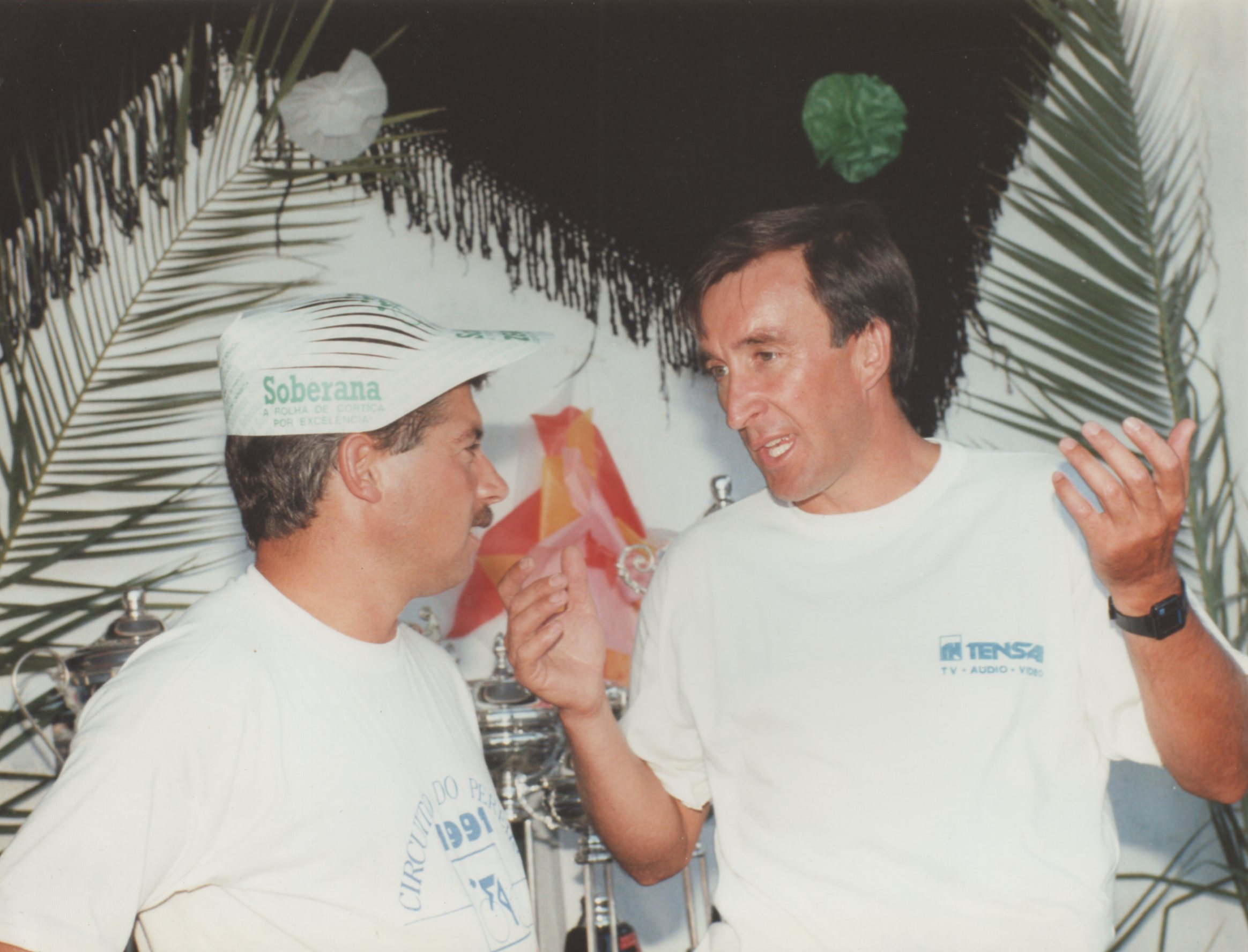

Personal information
- Full name: Marco António Chagas Martins
- Born: 19 November 1956 (age 69) Pontével, Cartaxo, Portugal

Cycling career
- Sport: Cycling
- Current team: Retired
- Discipline: Road
- Role: Rider

Amateur teams
- 1981–1982: FC Porto–UBP
- 1983: Mako Jeans

Professional teams
- 1976: Costa do Sol
- 1977–1978: CD Os Águias–Clok
- 1979: Lousa–Trinaranjus
- 1980: Puch–Sem–Campagnolo
- 1984–1987: Sporting–Raposeira
- 1988–1989: Louletano–Vale do Lobo
- 1990: Orima–Cantanhede

Major wins
- Stage races Volta a Portugal (1982, 1983, 1985, 1986) Volta ao Alentejo (1984) One-day races and Classics National Road Race Championships (1976, 1982, 1985)

Marco António Chagas Martins (born 19 November 1956) is a Portuguese former racing cyclist who is a cycling commentator on RTP. A professional rider from 1976 to 1990, he won the Volta a Portugal four times, in 1982, 1983, 1985 and 1986, making him the second most successful rider in the competition, after David Blanco. Chagas was stripped from his win at the 1979 Volta a Portugal due to doping.

== Major results ==
1976
1st Road race, National Road Championships
6th Overall Volta a Portugal

1st Stages 3, 10b & 12b (ITT)

1977
2nd Overall Grande Prémio do Minho

1st Stage 3b (ITT)

5th Overall Volta a Portugal
1978
1st Overall Rapport Toer
2nd Overall GP Abimota
1979
~~1st Overall Volta a Portugal~~

1st Stages 3a, 6b (ITT) & 9b

5th Overall Grande Prémio Jornal de Notícias
5th Overall Volta ao Algarve
1981
3rd Overall Grande Prémio Jornal de Notícias

1st Prologue (TTT)

7th Overall Volta a Portugal

1st Stage 2 (TTT)

1982
1st Road race, National Road Championships
1st Overall Volta a Portugal

1st Stages 2 & 10b

3rd Overall Volta ao Algarve
1983
1st Overall Volta a Portugal

1st Stages 7 & 11

1st Porto–Lisboa
1984
1st Overall Volta ao Alentejo

1st Stage 4a (ITT)

1st Prologue & Stages 3a (ITT) & 6b Volta a Portugal
1st Stage 1 Grande Prémio Jornal de Notícias
5th Overall Volta ao Algarve

1st Stage 4a

1985
1st Road race, National Road Championships
1st Overall Volta a Portugal

1st Prologue & Stages 9 & 13a (ITT)

2nd Overall Volta ao Algarve

1st Stages 2 & 6

1986
1st Overall Volta a Portugal

1st Stages 4, 7 (ITT), 11a & 11b (ITT)

1st Overall Grande Prémio do Minho

1st Stages 1, 3 & 5

2nd Overall Volta ao Algarve
3rd Overall Troféu Joaquim Agostinho
1987
1st Stage 5a (ITT) Volta a Portugal
1st Stage 1a Volta ao Alentejo
1988
2nd Overall Volta ao Algarve

1st Stage 10

3rd Overall Volta ao Alentejo
1989
1st Stage 1 Troféu Joaquim Agostinho
1st Stage 5 Grande Prémio do Minho
2nd Overall Volta ao Alentejo

1st Stage 7b

2nd Overall Volta ao Algarve
7th Overall GP Costa Azul

1st Prologue (ITT) & Stage 3

10th Overall Volta a Portugal
1990
1st Stages 1 & 3a Volta ao Alentejo
5th Overall Volta a Portugal
7th Overall Troféu Joaquim Agostinho

=== Grand Tour general classification results timeline ===
Grand Tour	1980	1981	1982	1983	1984	1985	1986	1987
Giro d'Italia	—	—	—	—	—	—	—	—
Tour de France	41	—	—	—	77	—	—	—
Vuelta a España	—	—	—	—	—	—	—	DNF

Legend
DSQ	Disqualified
DNF	Did not finish

== See also ==
- Doping in sport
- List of doping cases in cycling
