= Grande Prémio Internacional de Ciclismo MR Cortez-Mitsubishi =

Race details
- Date: April
- Region: Portugal
- Discipline: Road race
- Type: Stage race

History
- First edition: 1998
- Editions: 7
- Final edition: 2004
- First winner: Ángel Edo (ESP)
- Most wins: Ángel Edo (ESP) (2 wins)
- Final winner: Ángel Edo (ESP)

The Grande Prémio Internacional de Ciclismo MR Cortez-Mitsubishi was a professional cycling race held annually in Portugal from 1998 to 2004.

== Winners ==
Year	Winner	Second	Third
1998	(Spain) Ángel Edo	(Colombia) Santiago Botero	(Portugal) Paulo Jorge Ferreira
1999	(Russia) Serguei Smetanine	(Russia) Youri Sourkov	(Portugal) Delmino Pereira
2000	(Portugal) Bruno Castanheira	(Russia) Youri Sourkov	(Spain) José Enrique Gutiérrez
2001	(Spain) Juan Antonio Flecha	(Spain) Ángel Edo	(Czech Republic) René Andrle
2002	(Poland) Dariusz Baranowski	(Portugal) Rui Sousa	(Portugal) Gonçalo Amorim
2003	(Spain) Francisco Pérez Sanchez	(Spain) Ángel Edo	(Spain) Joan Horrach
2004	(Spain) Ángel Edo	(Portugal) Pedro Lopes	(Portugal) Pedro Cardoso
