= Portuguese National Road Race Championships =

National road cycling championship in Portugal

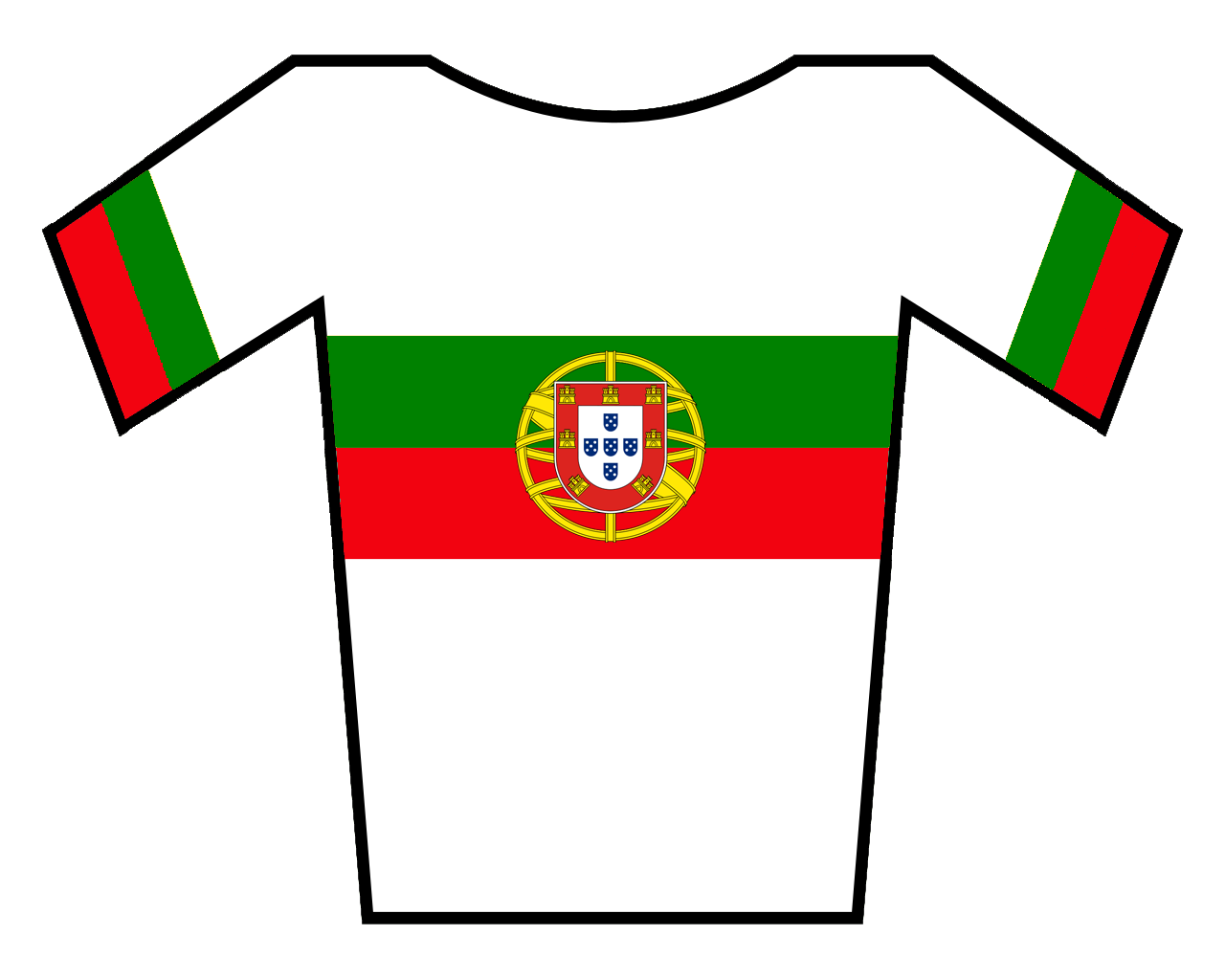

The Portuguese National Road Race Championships have been held since 1923.

== Men ==
Year	Gold	Silver	Bronze
1923	Manuel Rijo da Silva		
1924	Anibal da Silva		
1925	Anibal Carreto		
1926	Anibal Carreto		
1927	Antonio Malha		
1928	Antonio Augusto de Carvalho		
1930	Manuel Silva		
1931	José Maria Nicolau		
1932	José Maria Nicolau		
1933	José Maria Nicolau		
1934	Alfredo Trindade		
1935	José Marquez		
1936	Alfredo Trindade		
1937	José Marquez		
1938	Joaquim Manique		
1941	Francisco Inácio		
1942	João Lourenço		
1943	João Rebelo		
1944	João Rebelo		
1945	João Rebelo		
1946	Fernando Moreira	Eduardo Lopes	João Rebelo
1947	João Rebelo		
1948	João Rebelo		
1949	José Martins		
1950	Luciano Sa		
1951	Luciano Sa		
1952	António Maria		
1953	Onofre Marta		
1954	Alves Barbosa		
1955	Pedro António Polainas		
1956	Alves Barbosa		
1957	João Marcelino	Luciano Moreira de Sá	Pedro Polainas
1958	Antonino Dos Santos Baptista	José Carlos Sousa Cardoso	José Calquinhas
1959	Antonino Dos Santos Baptista	José Da Costa	Emidio Pinto
1960	Azevedo Maia		
1961	Ilidio Do Rosario	Alves Barbosa	Antonio Ferreira
1962	José Pacheco	Francisco Valada	Azevedo Maia
1963	Laurentino Mendes		
1964	Laurentino Mendes	Alberto Carvalho	Joaquim Leao
1965	Paulino Domingues	Manuel Correia	Antonio Acursio
1966	José Azevedo	Leonel Miranda	Mário Silva
1967	Antonio Acursio	Leonel Miranda	Fernando Mendes
1968	Joaquim Agostinho	Joaquim Andrade	Leonel Miranda
1969	Joaquim Agostinho	Fernando Mendes	Joaquim Leao
1970	Joaquim Agostinho	Fernando Mendes	Antonio Graca
1971	Joaquim Agostinho	Fernando Mendes	Firmino Bernardino
1972	Joaquim Agostinho	Joaquim Andrade	Fernando Mendes
1973	Joaquim Agostinho	Herculano de Oliveira	José Pacheco
1974	Fernando Mendes	Manuel Costa	Joaquim Andrade
1975	Fernando Mendes	Firmino Bernardino	José Freitas Martins
1976	Marco Chagas		
1977	José Maia		
1978	Fernando Mendes		
1979	Alexandre Ruas		
1980	Alexandre Ruas		
1982	Marco Chagas		
1983	Benjamin Carvalho		
1984	Carlos Manuel Francisco dos Santos		
1985	Marco Chagas	Adelino Teixeira	Carlos Ferreira
1986	Acácio da Silva	Fernando Carvalho Oliveira	Manuel Cunha Tavares
1987	Serafim Vieira	Carlos Marta Silva	Manuel Cunha Tavares
1988	Serafim Vieira	Carlos Pereira	Antonio Alves Pereira
1989	Delmino Pereira	Antonio Silva Monteiro	Antonio Apolo
1990	Joaquim Salgado	Jose Xavier Guimares	Vitor Teresinho Dias
1991	Luís Santos	Jorge Silva	Joaquim Gomes
1992	Fernando Mota	Jorge Silva	Manuel Abreu Campos
1993	Raul Matias	Pedro Silva Rodrigues	Albino Pereira
1994	Orlando Rodrigues	Joaquim Sampaio	Manuel Pedro Liberato
1995	Manuel Abreu	Paolo Ferreira	Serafim Vieira
1996	Carlos Neves	Quintino Rodrigues Silva	Orlando Rodrigues
1997	Delmino Pereira	Pedro Silva Rodrigues	Paolo Ferreira
1998	Carlos Carneiro	José Alves Sousa	Pedro Goncalves
1999	Carlos Carneiro	Orlando Rodrigues	Pedro Miguel Miranda
2000	Marcos Morais	Paulo De Moura	Rui Sousa
2001	Nuno Marta	Delmino Magelhaes	Pedro Lopes Goncalves
2002	Rui Lavarinhas	Rui Sousa	Renato Silva
2003	Pedro Soeiro	Nuno Ribeiro	Paolo De Moura Ferreira
2004 (Note: The original winner, Pedro Lopes, was disqualified for doping.)	Bruno Castanheira	Nuno Ribeiro	Nuno Marta
2005	Joaquim Andrade	César Quiterio	Claudio Faria
2006	Bruno Pires	Ricardo Mestre	Rui Sousa
2007	Cândido Barbosa	Gilberto Joao Sampaio	Pedro Cardoso
2008	João Cabreira	Tiago Machado	Cândido Barbosa
2009	Manuel Cardoso	Rui Costa	Heldér Oliveira
2010	Rui Sousa	Celio Sousa Alves	André Cardoso
2011	João Cabreira	Mário Costa	Filipe Cardoso
2012	Manuel Cardoso	António Carvalho	Edgar Pinto
2013	Joni Brandão	Tiago Machado	Heldér Oliveira
2014	Nelson Oliveira	Sérgio Sousa	Tiago Machado
2015	Rui Costa	Joni Brandão	Tiago Machado
2016	José Mendes	Nelson Oliveira	Ricardo Vilela
2017	Ruben Guerreiro	Rui Vinhas	Ricardo Vilela
2018	Domingos Gonçalves	Joni Brandão	Henrique Casimiro
2019	José Mendes	Ricardo Mestre	António Carvalho
2020	Rui Costa	Daniel Mestre	Francisco Campos
2021	José Fernandes	Rui Oliveira	Gaspar Gonçalves
2022	João Almeida	Tiago Antunes	Fábio Costa
2023	Ivo Oliveira	Rui Oliveira	Luís Gomes
2024	Rui Costa	Rui Oliveira	Luís Gomes
2025	Ivo Oliveira	Pedro Silva	Diogo Gonçalves
2026	Antonio Morgado	Afonso Silva	Rui Oliveira

== Women ==
Year	Gold	Silver	Bronze
1992	Ana Barros	Julia Alves	Ana Cancelo
1993			
1994	Ana Barros	Maria Alves Da Silva	Ana Cancelo
1995	Ana Barros	Maria Alves Da Silva	Ana Cancelo
1996	Ana Barros	Patricia Fernandes	Ana Cancelo
1997			
1998			
1999			
2000			
2001			
2002	Irina Coelho	Claudia Vitorino	Ana Rita Vigario
2003	Irina Coelho	Ana Rita Vigario	Sonia Campos
2004	Isabel Caetano	Sandra Araujo	Cristina Azevedo
2005	Isabel Caetano	Ana Rita Vigario	Cristina Azevedo
2006	Isabel Caetano	Ana Rita Vigario	Cristina Azevedo
2007	Irina Coelho	Isabel Caetano	Ana Rita Vigario
2008	Ester Alves	Angela Fernandes	Irina Coelho
2009	Ester Alves	Celina Carpinteiro	Rute Costa
2010	Vanessa Fernandes	Ester Alves	Celina Carpinteiro
2011	Celina Carpinteiro	Ester Alves	Monica Santos
2012	Irina Coelho	Celina Carpinteiro	Monica Santos
2013	Celina Carpinteiro	Daniela Reis	Ester Alves
2014	Celina Carpinteiro	Daniela Reis	Ana Isabel Dias Azenha
2015	Daniela Reis	Celina Carpinteiro	Irina Coelho
2016	Daniela Reis	Celina Carpinteiro	Irina Coelho
2017	Celina Carpinteiro	Irina Coelho	Madalena Almeida
2018	Daniela Reis	Maria Martins	Soraia Silva
2019	Daniela Reis	Liliana Jesus	Melissa Maia
2020	Melissa Maia	Marta Branco	Julia Ru
2021	Maria Martins	Daniela Campos	Daniela Pereira
2022	Daniela Campos	Sofia Gomes	Daniela Pereira
2023	Cristiana Valente	Beatriz Pereira	Vera Vilaca
2024	Daniela Campos	Ana Caramelo	Mariana Líbano
2025	Daniela Campos	Sofia Gomes	Maria Martins

== See also ==
- Portuguese National Time Trial Championships
- National road cycling championships
