= João Cabreira =

Portuguese bicycle racer

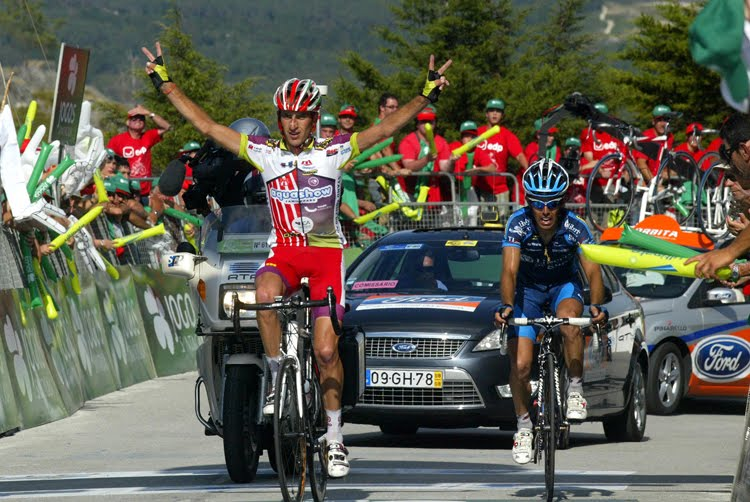

Personal information
- Full name: João Paulo Costa Cabreira
- Born: 12 May 1982 (age 44) Aguçadoura, Portugal

Cycling career
- Sport: Cycling
- Current team: Retired
- Discipline: Road
- Role: Rider

Professional teams
- 2005: Carvalhelhos–Boavista
- 2006–2008: Maia–Milaneza
- 2009: CC Loulé–Louletano–Aquashow
- 2011–2012: Onda

João Paulo Costa Cabreira (born 12 May 1982) is a Portuguese former cyclist.

== Major results ==
2004
1st Road race, National Under-23 Road Championships
1st Overall Volta a Portugal do Futuro

1st Stage 4

2006
1st Overall Volta ao Algarve

1st Stage 5

1st Stage 7 Volta a Portugal
2008
1st Road race, National Road Championships
2009
1st Stage 5 Volta a Portugal
3rd Overall Troféu Joaquim Agostinho

1st Stage 2

2011
1st Road race, National Road Championships
