= João Lourenço (cyclist) =

Portuguese racing cyclist

Personal information
- Full name: João Cândido Lourenço
- Born: 25 February 1917 Silves, Portugal
- Died: September 1998 (aged 81)

Cycling career
- Sport: Cycling
- Discipline: Road
- Role: Rider

Professional team
- 1939–1950: Sporting de Lisboa

João Cândido Lourenço (25 February 1917 – September 1998) was a Portuguese racing cyclist. Professional from 1939 to 1950, he notably won a stage of the Vuelta a España, 21 stages of the Volta a Portugal and the 1942 Portuguese national road race championships.

== Major results ==
1939
1st Stage 1 Tour du Maroc
1940
1st Stages 1, 3, 5, 7, 12, & 14 Volta a Portugal
1941
1st Stages 2a, 2b, 3, 5, 8b, 9a, 11a, 14, 15a & 15b Volta a Portugal
2nd Sprint, National Track Championships
1942
1st National Road Race Championships
1st Sprint, National Track Championships
1st Overall Vuelta a Mallorca
1st Stage 3 Volta a Catalunya
1943
1st Sprint, National Track Championships
1944
1st Sprint, National Track Championships
1946
1st Stage 7 Vuelta a España
1st Stages 8 & 15 Volta a Portugal
1947
1st Stages 2, 12 & 15 Volta a Portugal
