= Nuno Bico =

Portuguese cyclist

Personal information
- Full name: Nuno Miguel Bico Alves Matos
- Born: 3 July 1994 (age 32)
- Height: 1.81 m (5 ft 11 in)
- Weight: 64 kg (141 lb)

Cycling career
- Sport: Cycling
- Current team: Retired
- Discipline: Road
- Role: Rider

Professional teams
- 2013–2015: Rádio Popular–Onda
- 2016: Klein Constantia
- 2017–2018: Movistar Team
- 2019: Burgos BH

Nuno Miguel Bico Alves Matos (born 3 July 1994) is a Portuguese former professional cyclist, who competed professionally between 2013 and 2019 for the Rádio Popular–Boavista, Klein Constantia, Movistar Team and Burgos BH teams. In August 2019, he was named in the startlist for the 2019 Vuelta a España.

== Major results ==
2014
5th Road race, National Under–23 Road Championships
2015
1st Road race, National Under–23 Road Championships
2016
3rd Road race, National Under–23 Road Championships
7th Overall Volta ao Alentejo
7th Liège–Bastogne–Liège Espoirs

=== Grand Tour general classification results timeline ===
| Grand Tour | 2019 |
|---|---|
| Giro d'Italia | — |
| Tour de France | — |
| Vuelta a España | 153 |

Legend
| — | Did not compete |
| DNF | Did not finish |
