= Delmino Pereira =

Portuguese cyclist

Personal information
- Full name: Delmino Albano Magalhães Pereira
- Born: 23 August 1967 (age 59) Vila Real, Portugal

Cycling career
- Sport: Cycling
- Current team: Retired
- Discipline: Road
- Role: Rider

Professional team
- 1988–2001: Boavista–Sportlis

Major wins
- One-day races and Classics National Road Race Championships (1989, 1997)

Delmino Albano Magalhães Pereira (born 23 Aug 1967) is a Portuguese former professional road cyclist and former president of the Portuguese Cycling Federation. Professional from 1989 to 2001, he notably won the Portuguese National Road Race Championships in 1989 and 1997, as well as the Troféu Joaquim Agostinho in 1997. He also rode in the 1994 Vuelta a España, and finished 34th overall.

Pereira was elected as Vice-president of the European Cycling Union until 2025.

== Major results ==
1989
1st Road race, National Road Championships
1st Stage 3 Volta ao Alentejo
3rd Overall Troféu Joaquim Agostinho
5th Overall Volta a Portugal

1st Prologue

1990
1st Overall GP do Minho

1st Stages 1 & 2

1st Stage 1 GP Costa Azul
2nd Overall Volta ao Algarve

1st Stages 2 & 9

6th Overall Volta a Portugal
1991
3rd Overall Grande Prémio Jornal de Notícias
6th Overall Route du Sud
1992
1st Prologue Tour du Vaucluse
3rd Overall Grande Prémio Jornal de Notícias

1st Stage 4

9th Overall Route du Sud
1993
2nd Overall Troféu Joaquim Agostinho

1st Stage 5

3rd Road race, National Road Championships
8th Overall Volta a Portugal
1994
2nd Overall Volta a Portugal do Futuro

1st Stage 6

1995
3rd Overall Volta a Portugal
9th Overall Volta ao Algarve
1997
1st Road race, National Road Championships
1st Overall Troféu Joaquim Agostinho

1st Stages 1 & 2

1998
8th Overall Troféu Joaquim Agostinho
1999
1st Stage 5 Troféu Joaquim Agostinho
9th Overall Volta a Portugal
9th Overall Volta ao Algarve
2000
1st Stage 3 Grande Prémio Jornal de Notícias
2nd Overall GP CTT Correios de Portugal
9th Overall Volta ao Alentejo
2001
2nd Road race, National Road Championships
