= Fernando Mendes (cyclist) =

Portuguese cyclist

Personal information
- Born: 15 September 1946 Rio Meão, Portugal
- Died: 2 October 2001 (aged 55) Porto, Portugal

Cycling career
- Sport: Cycling
- Discipline: Road
- Role: Rider

Professional teams
- 1965: Ovarense
- 1966–1975: S.L. Benfica
- 1972–1973: Beaulieu–Flandria
- 1974: Kas–Kaskol
- 1976–1977: Teka
- 1978: Porto
- 1979: Zala
- 1980: Coimbrões
- 1981: Sem–France Loire–Campagnolo

Major wins
- One-day races and Classics National Road Race Championships (1974, 1975, 1978) National Time Trial Championships (1974, 1975) Stage races Volta a Portugal (1974)

Fernando Mendes (15 September 1946 – 2 October 2001) was a Portuguese cyclist.

== Major results ==
1966
9th Overall Volta a Portugal

1st Stage 9

1967
3rd Road race, National Road Championships
4th Overall Volta a Portugal
1968
1st Stage 5 Volta a Portugal
2nd Porto–Lisboa
1969
2nd Porto–Lisboa
6th Overall Volta a Portugal

1st Stage 6

1970
2nd Overall Volta a Portugal

1st Stages 8a & 9

1971
2nd Road race, National Road Championships
1972
3rd Overall Volta a Portugal
3rd Road race, National Road Championships
1973
1st Porto–Lisboa
2nd Overall Volta a Portugal

1st Stages 3 & 4

4th Overall Vuelta a Aragón
1974
National Road Championships

1st Road race
1st Time trial

1st Overall Volta a Portugal

1st Stages 11 & 15b

1975
National Road Championships

1st Road race
1st Time trial

1st National Cyclo-cross Championships
1st Overall Rapport Toer

1st Stages 2, 11 & 16

5th Overall Vuelta a Aragón
6th Overall Vuelta a España
1977
2nd Overall Vuelta a los Valles Mineros
1978
1st Road race, National Road Championships
1st Stage 11 Volta a Portugal
2nd Overall Volta ao Algarve

1st Stage 2

1979
6th Overall Volta ao Algarve
1981
4th Overall Route du Sud
4th Grand Prix de Cannes
