= Joan Horrach =

Spanish cyclist

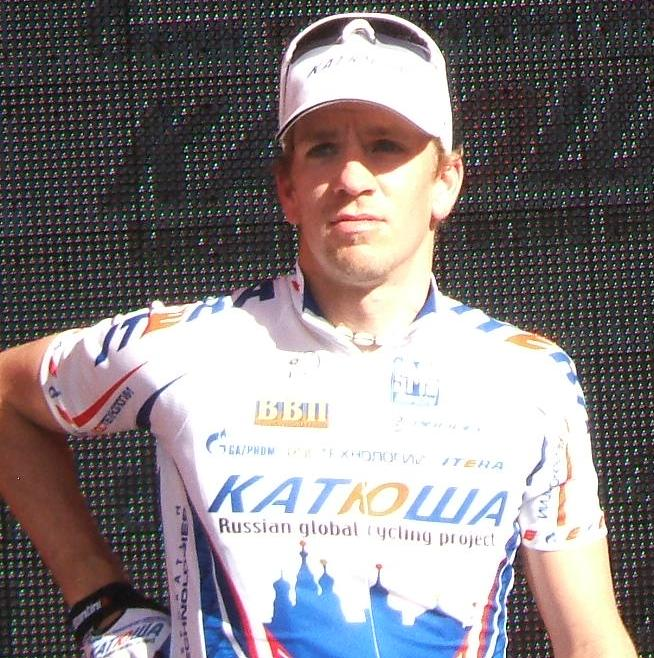
- Horrach at the 2009 Tour Down Under

Personal information
- Full name: Joan Horrach Ripoll
- Born: March 27, 1974 (age 52) Deià, Spain
- Height: 1.79 m (5 ft 10 in)
- Weight: 70 kg (154 lb; 11 st 0 lb)

Cycling career
- Sport: Cycling
- Current team: Retired
- Discipline: Road
- Role: Rider

Professional teams
- 2000–2003: União Ciclista da Maia–MSS
- 2004–2008: Illes Balears–Banesto
- 2009–2012: Team Katusha
- 2013: Madison Genesis

Major wins
- Grand Tours Giro d'Italia 1 individual stage (2006)

Joan Horrach Ripoll (born March 27, 1974) is a Spanish retired professional road racing cyclist. He last rode for Madison Genesis.

Horrach's biggest win of his career was Stage 11 of the 2006 Giro d'Italia. He won the stage by being in the break of the day and after making it to the final 3 riders he attacked as his companions crashed and held on to win by 5 seconds. As a domestique for his leaders Horrach spent most of his career working for others, occasionally given the opportunity to ride for himself.

After retiring he moved to Mallorca where he works as a Tour guide in Serra de Tramuntana on taking people on Mountain bikes, Road bikes and hiking.

== Major results ==
2000
1st Stage 2 Grande Prémio Jornal de Notícias
2001
1st Overall Grande Prémio Jornal de Notícias

1st Stage 4

2nd Overall Vuelta a Asturias

1st Stage 4

2002
1st Mountains classification, Setmana Catalana de Ciclisme
2nd Overall Volta a Portugal

1st Stages 5 & 11

2nd Overall Vuelta a Castilla y León
7th Overall GP do Minho
2003
3rd Overall Gran Premio Internacional Mitsubishi MR Cortez
5th Overall Troféu Joaquim Agostinho

1st Points classification
1st Stage 2

10th Overall Volta a Portugal
2005
9th Overall Escalada a Montjuïc
2006
1st Stage 11 Giro d'Italia
2010
1st Stage 3 (TTT) Vuelta a Burgos
2nd Trofeo Deià

=== General classification results timeline ===
Grand Tour general classification results
Grand Tour	2002	2003	2004	2005	2006	2007	2008	2009	2010	2011	2012
Giro d'Italia	—	—	—	37	36	DNF	81	—	54	53	—
Tour de France	—	—	—	—	—	—	—	74	—	—	119
/ Vuelta a España	33	28	24	27	79	29	—	—	74	67	—

Legend
—	Did not compete
DNF	Did not finish
