= Héctor Guerra =

Spanish cyclist

Personal information
- Full name: Héctor Guerra Garcia
- Born: 6 August 1978 (age 48) Madrid, Spain

Cycling career
- Sport: Cycling
- Current team: Retired
- Discipline: Road
- Role: Rider

Amateur team
- 2002: Alcosto–Fuenlabrada

Professional teams
- 2003–2004: Colchon Relax–Fuenlabrada
- 2005–2009: LA Alumínios–Liberty Seguros

Héctor Guerra Garcia (born 6 August 1978 in Madrid) is a Spanish former professional road cyclist and triathlete.

== Major results ==
2002
2nd Overall Vuelta Ciclista a León
6th Clásica a los Puertos
2003
4th Clásica a los Puertos
2004
9th Clásica a los Puertos
2005
4th Overall Tour du Poitou-Charentes
5th Overall G.P. Internacional do Oeste RTP
7th Overall Volta ao Algarve
2006
2nd Overall Volta a Portugal
7th Overall Volta ao Algarve
10th Overall Volta ao Distrito de Santarém
2007
1st Clásica a los Puertos
3rd Overall Volta a Portugal

1st Stage 10 (ITT)

3rd Overall Troféu Joaquim Agostinho
6th Overall Volta ao Alentejo
6th Overall Volta ao Distrito de Santarém
2008
1st Overall Volta ao Alentejo

1st Stage 3 (ITT)

1st GP Llodio
2nd Overall Volta a Portugal

1st Stage 10 (ITT)

4th Overall Volta ao Distrito de Santarém
4th Overall Volta ao Algarve
2009
1st Overall Troféu Joaquim Agostinho

1st Prologue & Stage 3

1st Overall Vuelta a la Comunidad de Madrid

1st Stage 1 (ITT)

2nd Overall Volta ao Alentejo

1st Stage 3 (ITT)

5th Subida al Naranco
9th Overall Vuelta a Asturias

1st Stage 3b (ITT)
