= Fernando Carvalho =

Portuguese cyclist

Personal information
- Full name: Alberto Fernando Carvalho Oliveira
- Born: 5 February 1965 (age 61)

Cycling career
- Sport: Cycling
- Current team: Retired
- Discipline: Road
- Role: Rider
- Rider type: All-rounder

Amateur teams
- 1982: Ovarense–Cortal
- 1983: Rodovil–Ajacto
- 1984: Ajacto–Morphy Richards
- 1985: Bombarralense–Case

Professional teams
- 1986: Lousa–Trinaranjus–Aka
- 1987: Salgueiros–Malhas
- 1988: Teka
- 1989: Louletano–Vale do Lobo
- 1990: Calçado Ruquita–Philips–Feirense
- 1991: Paternina-Don Zoilo
- 1992: Jovigroups–Paços De Ferreira
- 1993: Imporbor–Feirense
- 1995: W52–Paredes Móvel

Major wins
- Stage races Volta ao Alentejo (1989) Volta ao Algarve (1989, 1990) Volta a Portugal (1990)

Alberto Fernando Carvalho Oliveira (born 5 February 1965) was a leading Portuguese road cyclist in the late 1980s and early 1990s.

His strength was that of an all-rounder, able to win mountain stages, time-trials and sprints.

As the leader of the Ruquita team, he became a well-known cyclist in Spain, although his biggest victories came in Portugal, including the Volta ao Alentejo in 1989, the Volta ao Algarve in 1989 and 1990 and the Volta a Portugal in 1990.

He retired from cycling in 1994 and set up the Escola de Ciclismo Fernando Carvalho U18 and U23 race team, racing under the Dulcetextil colours from 2004-2006 and then L.A. Aluminios in 2007, as a part of the Fercase–Rota dos Móveis team.

He also established a custom cycling clothing brand in 2002 under his own name selling cycling and triathlon clothing to clubs around the world.

== Major results ==
1982
1st Stage 10a Volta a Portugal
1984
1st Stage 5 Volta ao Alentejo
2nd Overall Grande Prémio Jornal de Notícias
9th Overall Volta a Portugal
1985
1st Stage 8 Volta a Portugal
1986
1st Overall Grande Prémio Jornal de Notícias

1st Stage 5

2nd Road race, National Road Championships
4th Overall Volta a Portugal

1st Mountains classification
1st Stage 5

1987
5th Overall Volta ao Alentejo
1988
5th Overall Volta a Portugal
1989
1st Overall Volta ao Algarve

1st Stage 1

1st Overall Grande Prémio Jornal de Notícias
1st Overall Volta ao Alentejo

1st Points classification
1st Stages 1, 4b (TTT), 7a & 8

4th Overall GP Costa Azul

1st Prologue (TTT)

1990
1st Overall Volta a Portugal

1st Prologue (TTT) & Stages 7 & 16

1st Overall Volta ao Algarve

1st Stage 7

1993
1st Overall GP Abimota
1st Stage 14 Volta a Portugal
2nd Overall Volta ao Algarve
