= Adelino Teixeira =

Adelino Teixeira may refer to:

- Adelino Teixeira (footballer)
- Adelino Teixeira (cyclist)
