= Pedro Soeiro =

Portuguese cyclist

Personal information
- Full name: Pedro Miguel Miranda Soeíro
- Born: 11 September 1975 (age 51) Matosinhos, Portugal

Cycling career
- Sport: Cycling
- Current team: Retired
- Discipline: Road
- Role: Rider

Professional teams
- 1995–1998: W52–Paredes Móvel
- 1999–2006: Recer–Boavista
- 2007: Barbot–Halcon
- 2008–2010: Centro Ciclismo de Loulé

Major wins
- One-day races and Classics National Road Race Championships (2003)

Pedro Miguel Miranda Soeíro (born 11 September 1975) is a Portuguese professional road cyclist. Professional from 1995 to 2010, he most notably won the Portuguese National Road Race Championships in 2003.

== Major results ==
1999
1st Stage 3 Grand Prix Abimota
2000
1st Stage 3 Volta ao Alentejo
2003
1st Road race, National Road Championships
1st Porto–Lisboa
1st Stage 1 GP Cantanhede
2004
1st Overall Grand Prix Abimota

1st Stages 1 & 2

1st Porto–Lisboa
1st GP Area Metropolitana de Vigo
5th Road race, National Road Championships
7th Overall GP CTT Correios de Portugal
9th Overall Volta ao Alentejo
10th Overall Tour du Poitou Charentes
2005
2nd Overall Volta ao Alentejo

1st Points classification
1st Stage 1

1st Stage 3 Volta de Ciclismo Internacional do Estado de São Paulo
4th Road race, National Road Championships
2006
1st Stage 3 Volta de Ciclismo Internacional do Estado de São Paulo
6th Overall GP Costa Azul
