= Adelino Teixeira (cyclist) =

Portuguese cyclist

Personal information
- Born: 21 March 1954 (age 72) Ferreira de Aves, Portugal

Cycling career
- Sport: Cycling
- Current team: Retired
- Discipline: Road
- Role: Rider

Amateur teams
- 1976–1978: Lousa
- 1979: FC Porto
- 1980–1981: Lousa–Trinaranjus
- 1982: Bombarralense–Agriful
- 1983–1984: Lousa–Trinaranjus

Professional teams
- 1985–1986: Lousa–Trinaranjus-Akai
- 1987: Sporting–Vitalis
- 1988: Orima–Cantanhede

Major wins
- Stage races Volta a Portugal (1977) Volta ao Algarve (1983) Volta ao Alentejo (1985)

Adelino Teixeira (born 21 March 1954) is a Portuguese former professional road cyclist. He notably won the Volta a Portugal in 1977, the Volta ao Algarve in 1981, the Grande Prémio Jornal de Notícias in 1983 and the Volta ao Alentejo in 1985.

== Major results ==
1977
1st Overall Volta a Portugal

1st Stages 4 & 11

2nd Overall Volta ao Algarve

1st Stage 3

1978
2nd Overall Grande Prémio do Minho

1st Stage 4b

3rd Overall Volta ao Algarve
7th Overall Volta a Portugal
1979
3rd Overall Volta ao Algarve
10th Overall Volta a Portugal
1981
1st Overall GP Abimota
2nd Overall Volta ao Algarve
2nd Overall GP Torres Vedras
3rd Overall Volta a Portugal
1982
1st Stage 7 Volta ao Algarve
2nd Overall Volta a Portugal

1st Stage 8b

1983
1st Overall Volta ao Algarve

1st Stage 4

1st Overall Grande Prémio Jornal de Notícias
1st Stage 5 GP Torres Vedras
1984
4th Overall Volta a Portugal
1985
1st Overall Volta ao Alentejo

1st Stage 3b

2nd Road race, National Road Championships
8th Overall Volta a Portugal
