= 1942 Volta a Catalunya =

Race details
- Dates: 5–13 September 1942
- Stages: 9
- Distance: 1,262 km (784.2 mi)
- Winning time: 39h 30' 22"

Results
	Winner	Federico Ezquerra (ESP)
	Second	Julián Berrendero (ESP)
	Third	Diego Cháfer (ESP)

The 1942 Volta a Catalunya was the 22nd edition of the Volta a Catalunya cycle race and was held from 5 to 13 September 1942. The race started and finished in Barcelona. The race was won by Federico Ezquerra.

== Route and stages ==
List of stages
Stage	Date	Course	Distance	Winner
1	5 September	Barcelona International Exposition (TTT)	39 km (24 mi)	Antonio Andrés (ESP)
2	6 September	Barcelona to Vilafranca del Penedès	70 km (43 mi)	No winner awarded
3	7 September	Vilafranca del Penedès to Tortosa	146 km (91 mi)	João Lourenço (POR)
4 (A)	8 September	Tortosa to Reus	99 km (62 mi)	Alberto Raposo (POR)
4 (B)	8 September	Reus to Montblanc	37 km (23 mi)	Julián Berrendero (ESP)
4 (C)	8 September	Montblanc to Lleida	58 km (36 mi)	José Vidal (ESP)
5	9 September	Lleida to Vilanova de Bellpuig	140 km (87 mi)	Miguel Casas (ESP)
6	10 September	Vilanova de Bellpuig to Manresa	136 km (85 mi)	Julián Berrendero (ESP)
7	11 September	Manresa to Olot	147 km (91 mi)	Delio Rodríguez (ESP)
8 (A)	12 September	Olot to Figueres (ITT)	47 km (29 mi)	Fermo Camellini (ITA)
8 (B)	12 September	Figueres to Granollers	144 km (89 mi)	Fernando Murcia (ESP)
8 (C)	12 September	Granollers to Granollers	32 km (20 mi)	Delio Rodríguez (ESP)
9	13 September	Granollers to Barcelona	117 km (73 mi)	Agustín Miró (ESP)
	Total		1,212 km (753 mi)	

== General classification ==
Final general classification

Rank	Rider	Time
1	Federico Ezquerra (ESP)	39h 30' 22"
2	Julián Berrendero (ESP)	+ 9' 56"
3	Diego Cháfer (ESP)	+ 12' 40"
4	Cipriano Elys (ESP)	+ 14' 47"
5	Fermo Camellini (ITA)	+ 16' 26"
6	Antonio Andrés (ESP)	+ 19' 39"
7	Fernando Murcia (ESP)	+ 21' 41"
8	José Vidal (ESP)	+ 23' 09"
9	Vicente Miró (ESP)	+ 23' 22"
10	Vicente Carretero (ESP)	+ 23' 28"
