= Volta a Portugal =

Annual road bicycle racing competition

- 2026 Volta a Portugal

Race details
- Date: August
- Region: Portugal
- English name: Tour of Portugal
- Local name: Volta a Portugal em Bicicleta
- Discipline: Road
- Competition: UCI Europe Tour
- Type: Stage race
- Race director: Ezequiel Mosquera (2026- Present)
- Web site: avoltaportugal.com

History
- First edition: 1927
- Editions: 87 (as of 2026)
- First winner: Augusto de Carvalho (PRT)
- Most wins: David Blanco (ESP) (5 wins)
- Most recent: Alexis Guérin (FRA)

The Volta a Portugal (English: Tour of Portugal), also known as Volta a Portugal em Bicicleta (English: Tour of Portugal on Bicycle), is an annual multi-stage road bicycle racing competition held in Portugal. The competition takes place during a two-week span.

== History ==
The competition started in 1927, although its second edition only occurred in 1931. In 1936 and 1937 the tour did not take place. During World War II the race was cancelled between 1942 and 1945. In 1975 the competition was skipped due to the Carnation Revolution.

In the period 1940–1980 the competition was staged over three weeks. Since the 1980s it was reduced to the period of two weeks. As of 2005 the race consisted only of ten stages. In the last years the race consisted of ten stages and a prologue (a short time trial that starts the race). It is still the longest competition in cycling after the three grand Tours. It is one of the oldest stage races in the world. Although not as important as the three Grand Tours, it has long been a significant competition. In the last few years, however, it has declined in importance, especially because it now takes place immediately after the Tour de France, and before the Vuelta a España, a schedule that precludes the participation of major teams and cyclists.

== List of winners ==
Volta a Portugal winners
Year	Winner	Second	Third	Team Classification
1927	(Portugal) Augusto de Carvalho (Carcavelos)	(Portugal) Nunes Abreu (Leixões)	(Portugal) Quirino Oliveira (Campo de Ourique)	(Portugal) Carcavelos
The Volta did not take place between 1928 and 1930
1931	(Portugal) José Maria Nicolau (Benfica)	(Portugal) Alfredo Trindade (Rio de Janeiro)	(Portugal) João Francisco (Campo de Ourique)	(Portugal) Benfica
1932	(Portugal) Alfredo Trindade (Rio de Janeiro)	(Portugal) José Maria Nicolau (Benfica)	(Portugal) Carlos Domingues Leal (Benfica)	(Portugal) Benfica
1933	(Portugal) Alfredo Trindade (Sporting CP)	(Portugal) Ezequiel Lino (Sporting CP)	(Portugal) César Luís (Benfica)	(Portugal) Sporting CP
1934	(Portugal) José Maria Nicolau (Benfica)	(Portugal) Ezequiel Lino (Sporting CP)	(Portugal) Aguiar Cunha (Benfica)	(Portugal) Benfica
1935	(Portugal) César Luís (Velo Clube–Leões Ferreira do Alentejo)	(Portugal) José Marquez (Campo de Ourique)	(Portugal) Filipe de Melo (Carcavelos)	(Portugal) Campo de Ourique
The Volta did not take place between 1936 and 1937
1938	(Portugal) José Albuquerque (Campo de Ourique)	(Portugal) Filipe de Melo (Sporting CP)	(Portugal) Joaquim Fernandes (CUF)	(Portugal) CUF
1939	(Portugal) Joaquim Fernandes (CUF)	(Portugal) António Bartolomeu (Belenenses)	(Portugal) Aguiar Martins (Benfica)	(Portugal) Benfica
1940	(Portugal) José Albuquerque (Sporting CP)	(Portugal) Aguiar Martins (Benfica)	(Portugal) Aguiar Cunha (Benfica)	(Portugal) Sporting CP
1941	(Portugal) Francisco Inácio (Sporting CP)	(Portugal) José Martíns (Iluminante)	(Portugal) Aniceto Bruno (FC Porto)	(Portugal) Sporting CP
The Volta did not take place between 1942 and 1945
1946	(Portugal) José Martíns (Iluminante)	(Portugal) Fernando Moreira (FC Porto)	(Portugal) João Rebelo (Sporting CP)	(Portugal) Iluminante
1947	(Portugal) José Martíns (Benfica)	(Portugal) João Rebelo (Benfica)	(Portugal) Império dos Santos (Benfica)	(Portugal) Benfica
1948	(Portugal) Fernando Moreira (FC Porto)	(Spain) Emilio Rodríguez (Sangalhos)	(Portugal) João Rebelo (Benfica)	(Portugal) FC Porto
1949	(Portugal) Dias dos Santos (FC Porto)	(Italy) Attilio Lambertini (FC Porto)	(Portugal) Joaquim de Sá (FC Porto)	(Portugal) FC Porto
1950	(Portugal) Dias dos Santos (FC Porto)	(Italy) Mario Fazzio (Sporting CP)	(Portugal) Moreira de Sá (FC Porto)	(Portugal) FC Porto
1951	(Portugal) Alves Barbosa (Sangalhos)	(Spain) Manuel Rodríguez (Sangalhos)	(Spain) Emilio Rodríguez (Sangalhos)	(Portugal) Sangalhos
1952	(Portugal) Moreira de Sá (FC Porto)	(Spain) Emilio Rodríguez (Sangalhos)	(Spain) Manolo Rodríguez (Sangalhos)	(Portugal) FC Porto
The Volta did not take place between 1953 and 1954
1955	(Portugal) Ribeiro da Silva (Académico do Porto)	(Portugal) Sousa Santos (FC Porto)	(Portugal) Alves Barbosa (Sangalhos)	(Portugal) FC Porto
1956	(Portugal) Alves Barbosa (Sangalhos)	(Portugal) Ribeiro da Silva (Académico do Porto)	(Portugal) João Marcelino (Benfica)	(Portugal) Académico do Porto
1957	(Portugal) Ribeiro da Silva (Académico do Porto)	(Portugal) Sousa Santos (FC Porto)	(Portugal) Agostinho Ferreira (Académico do Porto)	(Portugal) Académico do Porto
1958	(Portugal) Alves Barbosa (Sangalhos)	(Portugal) Sousa Cardoso (FC Porto)	(Portugal) Carlos Carvalho (FC Porto)	(Portugal) FC Porto
1959	(Portugal) Carlos Carvalho (FC Porto)	(Portugal) Jorge Corvo (Ginásio de Tavira)	(Portugal) Aquiles Dos Santos (Sangalhos)	(Portugal) FC Porto
1960	(Portugal) Sousa Cardoso (FC Porto)	(Portugal) António Baptista (Sangalhos)	(Spain) António Gómez del Moral (Licor 43)	(Portugal) FC Porto
1961	(Portugal) Mário Silva (FC Porto)	(Italy) Augusto Marcoletti (Ignis)	(Portugal) Alberto Carvalho (Académico do Porto)	(Portugal) Sporting CP
1962	(Portugal) José Pacheco (FC Porto)	(Portugal) Peixoto Alves (Benfica)	(Portugal) Jorge Corvo (Ginásio de Tavira)	(Portugal) Sporting CP
1963	(Portugal) João Roque (Sporting CP)	(Portugal) Jorge Corvo (Ginásio de Tavira)	(Portugal) Peixoto Alves (Benfica)	(Portugal) Benfica
1964	(Portugal) Joaquim Leão (FC Porto)	(Portugal) Jorge Corvo (Ginásio de Tavira)	(Portugal) João Roque (Sporting CP)	(Portugal) FC Porto
1965	(Portugal) Peixoto Alves (Benfica)	(Portugal) João Roque (Sporting CP)	(Portugal) Mário Silva (FC Porto)	(Belgium) Flandria
1966	(Portugal) Francisco Valada (Benfica)	(Portugal) Peixoto Alves (Benfica)	(Portugal) Sérgio Páscoa (Ginásio de Tavira)	(Portugal) Benfica
1967	(Belgium) Antoine Houbrechts (Flandria)	(Portugal) João Roque (Sporting CP)	(Portugal) Manuel Correia (Sporting CP)	(Portugal) Sporting CP
1968	(Portugal) Américo Silva (Benfica)	(Portugal) Joaquim Agostinho (Sporting CP)	(Portugal) Leonel Miranda (Sporting CP)	(Portugal) Sporting CP
1969	(Portugal) Joaquim Andrade (Sangalhos)	(Portugal) Fernando Mendes (Benfica)	(Portugal) Mário Silva (FC Porto)	(Portugal) FC Porto
1970	(Portugal) Joaquim Agostinho (Sporting CP)	(Portugal) Firmino Bernardino (Sporting CP)	(Portugal) José Florêncio (Coelima)	(Portugal) Sporting CP
1971	(Portugal) Joaquim Agostinho (Sporting CP)	(France) Alain Santy (Bic)	(Portugal) Firmino Bernardino (Sporting CP)	(Portugal) Sporting CP
1972	(Portugal) Joaquim Agostinho (Sporting CP)	(Portugal) José Freitas Martins (Coelima)	(Spain) José-Luis Galdamez (Coelima)	(Portugal) Sporting CP
1973	(Spain) Jesús Manzaneque (Messias)	(Portugal) Fernando Mendes (Benfica)	(Portugal) José Freitas Martins (Coelima)	(Portugal) Sporting CP
1974	(Portugal) Fernando Mendes (Benfica)	(Portugal) Dinis Silva (Benfica)	(Portugal) António Martins (Benfica)	(Portugal) Benfica
The Volta did not take place in 1975
1976	(Portugal) Firmino Bernardino (Benfica)	(Portugal) António Fernandes (Sangalhos)	(Portugal) Fernando Mendes (Sangalhos)	(Portugal) Sangalhos
1977	(Portugal) Adelino Teixeira (Lousa)	(Portugal) Joaquim Sousa Santos (Bombarralense)	(Portugal) Joaquim Andrade (Coimbrões)	(Portugal) Águias
1978	(Portugal) Belmiro Silva (Coimbrões)	(Portugal) Armindo Lúcio (Lousa)	(Portugal) Adelino Teixeira (Coelima)	(Portugal) Lousa
1979	(Portugal) Joaquim Sousa Santos (FC Porto)	(Portugal) Belmiro Silva (Coimbrões)	(Portugal) Fernando Fernandes (Bombarral)	(Portugal) FC Porto
1980	(Portugal) Francisco Miranda (Lousa)	(Portugal) Luis Vargues (Campinense)	(Portugal) Belmiro Silva (FC Porto)	(Portugal) FC Porto
1981	(Portugal) Manuel Zeferino (FC Porto)	(Portugal) Venceslau Fernandes (Rodovil)	(Portugal) Fernando Fernandes (FC Porto)	(Portugal) FC Porto
1982	(Portugal) Marco Chagas (FC Porto)	(Portugal) Adelino Teixeira (Bombarralense)	(Portugal) Manuel Zeferino (FC Porto)	(Portugal) Bombarralense
1983	(Portugal) Marco Chagas (Mako Jeans)	(Portugal) António Pinto (Rodovil)	(Portugal) Belmiro Silva (FC Porto)	(Portugal) Rodovil
1984	(Portugal) Venceslau Fernandes (Ajacto)	(Portugal) Manuel Zeferino (Sporting CP)	(Portugal) Manuel Cunha (Ovarense)	(Portugal) Sporting CP
1985	(Portugal) Marco Chagas (Sporting CP)	(Portugal) Eduardo Correia (Sporting CP)	(Portugal) Venceslau Fernandes (Ajacto)	(Portugal) Sporting CP
1986	(Portugal) Marco Chagas (Sporting CP)	(Portugal) Benedito Ferreira (Toreensse–Sicasal)	(Portugal) António Pinto (Lousa)	(Portugal) Lousa
1987	(Portugal) Manuel Cunha (Sicasal–Toreensse)	(Portugal) Manuel Neves (Boavista F.C.)	(Portugal) Fernando Fernandes (Sicasal–Toreensse)	(Portugal) Sicasal–Toreensse
1988	(United Kingdom) Cayn Theakston (Louletano–Vale do Lobo)	(Portugal) Jorge Silva (Sicasal–Toreensse)	(Portugal) Joaquim Gomes (Louletano–Vale do Lobo)	(Portugal) Louletano–Vale do Lobo
1989	(Portugal) Joaquim Gomes (Sicasal)	(Brazil) Cássio Freitas (Louletano)	(Portugal) António Alves (Recer–Boavista)	(Portugal) Recer–Boavista
1990	(Portugal) Fernando Carvalho (Calçado Ruquita–Philips–Feirense)	(Portugal) Joaquim Gomes (Sicasal)	(Portugal) Jorge Silva (Sicasal–Acral)	(Portugal) Sicasal–Acral
1991	(Portugal) Jorge Silva (Sicasal–Acral)	(Portugal) Orlando Rodrigues (Ruquita–Feirense)	(Spain) Vicente Ridaura (Artiach–Royal)	(Portugal) Sicasal–Acral
1992	(Brazil) Cássio Freitas (Recer–Boavista)	(Portugal) Quintino Rodrigues (Ruquita–Feirense)	(Portugal) Manuel Abreu (Tensai)	(Portugal) Sicasal–Acral
1993	(Portugal) Joaquim Gomes (Recer–Boavista)	(Portugal) Vítor Gamito (Sicasal)	(Colombia) Luis Espinosa (Artiach–Filipinos–Chiquilin)	(Spain) Artiach–Filipinos–Chiquilin
1994	(Portugal) Orlando Rodrigues (Artiach)	(Portugal) Vítor Gamito (Sicasal)	(Portugal) Joaquim Gomes (Recer–Boavista)	(Spain) Artiach–Nabisco
1995	(Portugal) Orlando Rodrigues (Artiach)	(Portugal) Quintino Rodrigues (Sicasal)	(Portugal) Delmino Pereira (Recer–Boavista)	(Portugal) Sicasal–Acral
1996	(Italy) Massimiliano Lelli (Saeco)	(Portugal) Vítor Gamito (MXO)	(Portugal) Manuel Abreu (Maia–CIN)	(Portugal) Maia–CIN
1997	(Poland) Zenon Jaskuła (Mapei)	(Italy) Wladimir Belli (Brescialat)	(Portugal) Joaquim Gomes (LA–Pecol)	(Portugal) Recer–Boavista
1998	(Italy) Marco Serpellini (Brescialat)	(Portugal) Orlando Rodrigues (Banesto)	(Italy) Wladimir Belli (Festina)	(France) Festina
1999	(Spain) David Plaza (Benfica)	(Portugal) Vítor Gamito (Porta da Ravessa)	(Spain) Melcior Mauri (Benfica)	(Portugal) Benfica
2000	(Portugal) Vítor Gamito (Porta da Ravessa)	(Denmark) Claus Møller (Maia–MSS)	(Russia) Andrei Zintchenko (LA–Pecol)	(Portugal) LA–Pecol
2001	(Switzerland) Fabian Jeker (Milaneza–MSS)	(Russia) Andrei Zintchenko (LA–Pecol)	(Spain) Juan Miguel Mercado (iBanesto)	(Portugal) Porta da Ravessa
2002	(Denmark) Claus Møller (Milaneza–MSS)	(Spain) Joan Horrach (Milaneza–MSS)	(Portugal) Rui Sousa (Milaneza–MSS)	(Portugal) Milaneza–MSS
2003	(Portugal) Nuno Ribeiro (LA–Pecol)	(Denmark) Claus Møller (Milaneza–MSS)	(Portugal) Rui Lavarinhas (Milaneza–MSS)	(Portugal) Milaneza–MSS
2004	(Spain) David Bernabeu (Milaneza–Maia)	(Spain) David Arroyo (LA–Pecol)	(Portugal) Nuno Ribeiro (LA–Pecol)	(Portugal) Milaneza–Maia
2005	(Russia) Vladimir Efimkin (Team Barloworld)	(Portugal) Cândido Barbosa (LA–Liberty)	(Spain) Adolfo García Quesada (Comunidad Valenciana)	(Portugal) LA–Liberty
2006	(Spain) David Blanco (Comunidad Valenciana)	(Spain) Héctor Guerra (LA–Liberty)	(Portugal) Cândido Barbosa (LA–Liberty)	(Portugal) LA–Liberty
2007	(Spain) Xavier Tondo (LA–MSS)	(Portugal) Cândido Barbosa (Liberty Seguros)	(Spain) Héctor Guerra (Liberty Seguros)	(Portugal) LA–MSS
2008	(Spain) David Blanco (Palmeiras Resort–Tavira)	(Spain) Héctor Guerra (Liberty Seguros)	(Spain) Rubén Plaza (Benfica)	(Portugal) Liberty Seguros
2009	(Spain) David Blanco (Palmeiras Resort–Tavira)	(Spain) David Bernabeu (Barbot–Siper)	(Spain) Rubén Plaza (Liberty Seguros)	(Portugal) Palmeiras Resort–Tavira
2010	(Spain) David Blanco (Palmeiras Resort–Prio)	(Spain) David Bernabeu (Barbot–Siper)	(Spain) Sergio Pardilla (Carmiooro)	(Portugal) Barbot–Siper
2011	(Portugal) Ricardo Mestre (Tavira–Prio)	(Portugal) André Cardoso (Tavira–Prio)	(Portugal) Rui Sousa (Barbot–Efapel)	(Portugal) Tavira–Prio
2012	(Spain) David Blanco (Efapel–Glassdrive)	(Portugal) Hugo Sabido (LA–Antarte)	(Portugal) Rui Sousa (Efapel–Glassdrive)	(Portugal) Efapel–Glassdrive
2013	(Spain) Alejandro Marque (OFM–Quinta da Lixa)	(Spain) Gustavo César (OFM–Quinta da Lixa)	(Portugal) Rui Sousa (Efapel–Glassdrive)	(Portugal) Efapel–Glassdrive
2014	(Spain) Gustavo César (OFM–Quinta da Lixa)	(Portugal) Rui Sousa (Radio Popular-Onda)	(Spain) Delio Fernández (OFM–Quinta da Lixa)	(Portugal) OFM–Quinta da Lixa
2015	(Spain) Gustavo César (W52–Quinta da Lixa)	(Portugal) Joni Brandão (Efapel)	(Spain) Alejandro Marque (Efapel)	(Portugal) W52–Quinta da Lixa
2016	(Portugal) Rui Vinhas (W52 / FC Porto / Porto Canal)	(Spain) Gustavo César (W52 / FC Porto / Porto Canal)	(Portugal) Daniel Silva (Rádio Popular–Boavista)	(Portugal) W52 / FC Porto / Porto Canal
2017	(Spain) ~~Raúl Alarcón (W52 / FC Porto / Mestre da Cor)~~	(Portugal) Amaro Antunes (W52 / FC Porto / Mestre da Cor)	(Spain) Vicente García de Mateos (Louletano–Hospital de Loulé)	(Portugal) W52 / FC Porto / Mestre da Cor
2018	(Spain) ~~Raúl Alarcón (W52 / FC Porto)~~	(Portugal) Joni Brandão (Sporting / Tavira)	(Spain) Vicente García de Mateos (Aviludo–Louletano)	(Portugal) W52 / FC Porto
2019	(Portugal) João Rodrigues (W52 / FC Porto)	(Portugal) Joni Brandão (Efapel)	(Spain) Gustavo César (W52 / FC Porto)	(Portugal) W52 / FC Porto
2020	(Portugal) Amaro Antunes (W52 / FC Porto)	(Spain) Gustavo César (W52 / FC Porto)	(Portugal) Frederico Figueiredo (Atum General / Tavira / Maria Nova Hotel)	(Portugal) W52 / FC Porto
2021	(Portugal) ~~Amaro Antunes (W52 / FC Porto)~~	(Uruguay) Mauricio Moreira (Efapel)	(Spain) Alejandro Marque (Atum General / Tavira / Maria Nova Hotel)	(Portugal) Efapel
2022	(Uruguay) Mauricio Moreira (Glassdrive–Q8–Anicolor)	(Portugal) Frederico Figueiredo (Glassdrive–Q8–Anicolor)	(Portugal) António Carvalho (Glassdrive–Q8–Anicolor)	(Portugal) Glassdrive–Q8–Anicolor
2023	(Switzerland) Colin Stüssi (Team Vorarlberg)	(Spain) Txomin Juaristi (Euskaltel–Euskadi)	(Portugal) António Carvalho (ABTF Betão–Feirense)	(Portugal) Glassdrive–Q8–Anicolor
2024	Artem Nych (Sabgal–Anicolor)	(Switzerland) Colin Stüssi (Team Vorarlberg)	(Puerto Rico) Abner González (Efapel Cycling)	(Portugal) Euskaltel–Euskadi
2025	Artem Nych (Anicolor / Tien 21)	(France) Alexis Guérin (Anicolor / Tien 21)	(South Africa) Byron Munton (Feirense–Beeceler)	(Portugal) Anicolor / Tien 21
2026	(France) Alexis Guérin (Anicolor / Campicarn)	Artem Nych (Anicolor / Campicarn)	(Portugal) Pedro Silva (Feira dos Sofás–Boavista)	(Portugal) Anicolor / Campicarn

=== Wins by cyclist ===
Cyclist	Wins
(Spain) David Blanco	5
(Portugal) Marco Chagas	4
(Portugal) Alves Barbosa	3
(Portugal) Joaquim Agostinho	3
(Portugal) Alfredo Trindade	2
(Portugal) Dias dos Santos	2
(Spain) Gustavo César	2
(Portugal) Joaquim Gomes	2
(Portugal) José Albuquerque	2
(Portugal) José Maria Nicolau	2
(Portugal) José Martíns	2
(Portugal) Orlando Rodrigues	2
(Portugal) Ribeiro da Silva	2
(Portugal) Amaro Antunes	2
(Russia) Artem Nych	2

1 win

- Adelino Teixeira
- Alejandro Marque
- Américo Silva
- Antoine Houbrechts
- Augusto de Carvalho
- Belmiro Silva
- Carlos Carvalho
- Cássio Freitas
- Cayn Theakston
- César Luís
- Claus Moller
- Colin Stüssi
- David Bernabéu
- David Plaza
- Fabian Jeker
- Fernando Carvalho
- Fernando Mendes dos Reis Dias
- Fernando Moreira
- Firmino Bernardino
- Francisco Inácio
- Francisco Miranda
- Francisco Valada
- Jesús Manzaneque
- João Rodrigues
- João Roque
- Joaquim Andrade
- Joaquim Fernandes
- Joaquim Leão
- Joaquim Sousa Santos
- Jorge Silva
- José Pacheco
- Manuel Cunha
- Manuel Zeferino
- Marco Serpellini
- Mário Silva
- Massimiliano Lelli
- Mauricio Moreira
- Moreira de Sá
- Nuno Ribeiro
- Peixoto Alves
- Ricardo Mestre
- Rui Vinhas
- Sousa Cardoso
- Venceslau Fernandes
- Vítor Gamito
- Vladimir Efimkin
- Xavier Tondo
- Zenon Jaskuła

==== Wins by team ====
Team	Individual titles	General classification	Team titles	Team classification
(Portugal) FC Porto	12	1948, 1949, 1950, 1952, 1959, 1960, 1961, 1962, 1964, 1979, 1981, 1982	12	1948, 1949, 1950, 1952, 1955, 1958, 1959, 1964, 1969, 1979, 1980, 1981
(Portugal) Sporting CP	9	1933, 1940, 1941, 1963, 1970, 1971, 1972, 1985, 1986	13	1933, 1940, 1941, 1961, 1962, 1967, 1968, 1970, 1971, 1972, 1973, 1984, 1985
(Portugal) Benfica	9	1931, 1934, 1947, 1965, 1966, 1968, 1974, 1976, 1999	9	1931, 1932, 1934, 1939, 1947, 1963, 1966, 1974, 1999
(Portugal) União Ciclista de Sobrado	7	2013, 2014, 2015, 2016, 2017, 2019, 2020	7	2014, 2015, 2016, 2017, 2018, 2019, 2020
(Portugal) Clube de Ciclismo de Tavira	5	2008, 2009, 2010, 2011, 2018	2	2009, 2011
(Portugal) União Ciclista da Maia	4	2001, 2002, 2004, 2007	5	1996, 2002, 2003, 2004, 2007
(Portugal) Sangalhos	4	1951, 1956, 1958, 1969	2	1951, 1976
(Portugal) Sicasal	3	1987, 1989, 1991	5	1987, 1990, 1991, 1992, 1995
(Portugal) Clube Desportivo Fullracing (Barbot–Siper/Efapel–Glassdrive/Glassdrive-Q8–Anicolor)	2	2012, 2022	6	2010, 2012, 2013, 2021, 2022, 2023
(Portugal) Académico do Porto	2	1955, 1957	2	1956, 1957
(Portugal) Lousa	2	1977, 1980	2	1978, 1986
(Spain) Artiach	2	1994, 1995	2	1993, 1994
(Portugal) Recer–Boavista	2	1992, 1993	2	1989, 1997
(Portugal) Águias/LA–Pecol/LA–Liberty/Liberty Seguros	1	2003	5	1977, 2000, 2005, 2006, 2008
(Portugal) Carcavelos	1	1927	1	1927
(Portugal) Campo de Ourique	1	1938	1	1935
(Portugal) CUF	1	1939	1	1938
(Portugal) Iluminante	1	1946	1	1946
(Belgium) Flandria	1	1967	1	1965
(Portugal) Porta da Ravessa	1	2000	1	2001
(Portugal) Louletano–Vale do Lobo	1	1988	1	1988
(Portugal) Rio de Janeiro	1	1932	0	—
(Portugal) Velo Clube "Os Leões"	1	1935	0	—
(Spain) Messias	1	1973	0	—
(Portugal) Coimbrões	1	1978	0	—
(Portugal) Mako Jeans	1	1983	0	—
(Portugal) Ajacto	1	1984	0	—
(Portugal) Ruquita–Feirense	1	1990	0	—
(Italy) Saeco	1	1996	0	—
(Italy) Mapei	1	1997	0	—
(Italy) Brescialat	1	1998	0	—
(United Kingdom) Team Barloworld	1	2005	0	—
(Spain) Comunidad Valenciana	1	2006	0	—
(Austria) Team Vorarlberg	1	2023	0	—
(Portugal) Licor 43	0	—	1	1960
(Portugal) Bombarralense	0	—	1	1982
(Portugal) Rodovil	0	—	1	1983
(France) Festina	0	—	1	1998

==== Wins by country ====
Country	Wins
Portugal	60
Spain	12
Italy	2
Switzerland	2
Belgium	1
United Kingdom	1
Brazil	1
Poland	1
Denmark	1
Russia	1
Uruguay	1

== Classifications ==
As of the 2026 edition, the jerseys worn by the leaders of the individual classifications are:

- Yellow Jersey – Worn by the leader of the general classification.
- Orange Jersey – Worn by the leader of the points classification.
- Blue Jersey – Worn by the leader of the climbing classification.
- White Jersey – Worn by the best rider under 23 years of age on the overall classification.

== Women's race ==
Since 2021, a women's edition of the race, known as the Volta a Portugal Feminina, has been held. Initially on the national calendar, it has been categorized as a 2.2 UCI event since 2024.

=== Winners ===
Year	Country	Rider	Team
2021	Portugal	Raquel Queirós	
2022	Sweden	Nathalie Eklund	Massi–Tactic
2023	Russia	Valeria Valgonen	Massi–Tactic
2024	France	India Grangier	Team Coop–Repsol
2025	Switzerland	Jasmin Liechti	Nexetis
2026	France	Victoire Berteau	Cofidis
