= David Muñoz (cyclist) =

Spanish cyclist

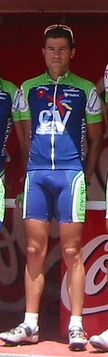

Personal information
- Full name: David Muñoz Bañón
- Born: June 9, 1979 (age 47) Elche, Spain

Cycling career
- Sport: Cycling
- Current team: Retired
- Discipline: Road
- Role: Rider

Professional teams
- 2001–2006: Kelme
- 2007: Fuerteventura–Canarias

David Muñoz Bañón (born June 9, 1979, in Elche) is a former Spanish cyclist.

== Major results ==
2002
1st stage 7 Volta a Portugal
3rd Tour de l'Avenir
3rd Trofeo Calvià
3rd Trofeo Magaluf-Palmanova
2005
2nd Vuelta a Mallorca
3rd Clásica de Almería
2006
1st stage 3 Giro del Trentino
