= Troféu Joaquim Agostinho =

Cycling race in Portugal

Race details
- Date: Early July
- Region: Torres Vedras, Portugal
- English name: Trophy Joaquim Agostinho
- Local name: Troféu Joaquim Agostinho (in Portuguese)
- Discipline: Road
- Competition: UCI Europe Tour
- Type: Stage race
- Web site: www.udo.pt/trofeu-joaquim-agostinho

History
- First edition: 1978
- Editions: 49 (as of 2026)
- First winner: Carlos Santos (POR)
- Most wins: Frederico Figueiredo (POR)(3 wins)
- Most recent: Tiago Antunes (POR)

The Grande Prémio Internacional de Torres Vedras – Troféu Joaquim Agostinho is a road bicycle racing stage race held annually in the Torres Vedras, Portugal. Since 2005, it has been organised as a 2.1 event on the UCI Europe Tour.

== Winners ==
Year	Country	Rider	Team
1978	Portugal	Carlos Santos	S.L. Benfica
1979	Portugal	Firmino Bernardino	Lousa–Trinaranjus
1980	Portugal	Alexandre Ruas	Coelima
1981	Portugal	Venceslau Fernandes	Rodovil–Izuzu
1982	Portugal	José Xavier	Bombarralense–Agriful
1983	East Germany	Hardy Groeger	East Germany (national team)
1984	Portugal	Fernando Fernandes	Lousa–Trinaranjus
1985	Spain	José María Barcala	Teka
1986	Soviet Union	Piotr Ugrumov	USSR (national team)
1987	Portugal	Américo Silva	Sporting–Vitalis
1988	Portugal	Jacinto Paulinho	Louletano–Vale do Lobo
1989	Portugal	Rui Duro	Atum Bom Petisco–Tavira
1990	Portugal	Joaquim Gomes	Sicasal–Acral
1991	Ukraine	Viktor Klimov	Seur–Otero
1992	Portugal	João Silva	Tensai–Mundial Confiança
1993	Portugal	Joaquim Sampaio	Sicasal–Acral
1994	Portugal	Joaquim Gomes	Recer–Boavista
1995	Portugal	Orlando Rodrigues	Artiach
1996	Portugal	Joaquim Sampaio	Maia–Jumbo–Cin
1997	Portugal	Delmino Pereira	Recer–Boavista
1998	Portugal	José Azevedo	Maia–Cin
1999	Spain	Juan Carlos Guillamón	Gresco–Tavira
2000	Kazakhstan	Youri Sourkov	LA–Pecol
2001	Spain	Adrián Palomares	Carvalhelhos–Boavista
2002	Spain	David Bernabeu	Carvalhelhos–Boavista
2003	Switzerland	Fabian Jeker	Milaneza–MSS
2004	Spain	David Bernabeu	Milaneza Maia
2005	Argentina	Gerardo Fernández	Paredes Rota dos Moveis–Beira Tamega
2006	Bulgaria	Danail Petrov	Maia Milaneza
2007	Spain	Xavier Tondo	LA–MSS
2008	Portugal	Tiago Machado	Madeinox–Boavista
2009	Spain	Héctor Guerra	Liberty Seguros Continental
2010	Portugal	Cândido Barbosa	Palmeiras–Resort–Prio
2011	Portugal	Ricardo Mestre	Tavira–Prio
2012	Portugal	Ricardo Mestre	Carmim–Prio
2013	Spain	Eduard Prades	OFM–Quinta da Lixa
2014	Spain	Delio Fernández	OFM–Quinta da Lixa
2015	Portugal	João Benta	Louletano–Ray Just Energy
2016	Italy	Rinaldo Nocentini	Sporting / Tavira
2017	Portugal	Amaro Antunes	W52 / FC Porto / Mestre da Cor
2018	Portugal	José Fernandes	W52 / FC Porto
2019	Portugal	Henrique Casimiro	Efapel
2020	Portugal	Frederico Figueiredo	Atum General / Tavira / Maria Nova Hotel
2021	Portugal	Frederico Figueiredo	Efapel
2022	Portugal	Frederico Figueiredo	Glassdrive–Q8–Anicolor
2023	Uruguay	Mauricio Moreira	Glassdrive–Q8–Anicolor
2024	Venezuela	Orluis Aular	Caja Rural–Seguros RGA
2025	France	Alexis Guérin	Anicolor / Tien 21
2026	Portugal	Tiago Antunes	Efapel Cycling
