= S.L. Benfica (cycling) =

Benfica
Team information
- UCI code: SLB
- Registered: Portugal
- Founded: 5 May 1906
- Disbanded: 2008
- Discipline: Road
- Status: UCI ProTeam
- Bicycles: Specialized

Team name history
Jersey

Sport Lisboa e Benfica (UCI team code: SLB; Portuguese pronunciation: [sɨˈpɔɾ liʒˈβoɐ i βɐ̃jˈfikɐ]), commonly known as Benfica, was a professional road bicycle racing team based in Lisbon, Portugal.

== History ==
Cycling was the main sport of the original Grupo Sport Benfica formed in 1906. Upon the merger with Sport Lisboa in 1908, a cycling department established within the new Sport Lisboa e Benfica, and along with football, is one of only two sports referenced in the club's logo. The sport was in activity from 1906 to 1941, 1947 to 1978, 1999 to 2000, and once again for two seasons in 2007 and 2008.

In 1931 the Portuguese cycling legend José Maria Nicolau won the Volta a Portugal and helped Benfica to win the Volta as a team. Benfica won the Volta once again in 1932. In 1934, Benfica won the Volta for the third time with Nicolau being the overall winner, beating his rival Alfredo Trindade from Sporting of Lisbon. After some years without success, Benfica won another Volta as a team in 1939. The benfiquistas had to wait until 1947 (due to the end of the cycling section in 1941) to see once again one of their cyclists winning the Volta. It was José Martins, who also helped Benfica to win the Volta as a team.

In 1963, Benfica won its sixth Volta a Portugal, but had to wait two more years to see a Benfica cyclist winning the Volta. It was Peixoto Alves, who was succeeded by Francisco Valada one year later and another team win.

In 1968 Américo Silva won the Volta, but Benfica failed to win it as a team. That happened in 1974, when Benfica won its eighth Volta (and due to the cycling section's end in 1978 the last one for a long time) and its cyclist Fernando Mendes the seventh individual Volta for Benfica. Two years later, in 1976, Firmino Bernardino won the last Volta for Benfica before its end in 1978.

It was the Spanish cyclist David Plaza, the first foreigner to win a Volta for Benfica, who won the last individual Volta for Benfica in 1999. It was the same year that Benfica won its ninth and so far last Volta a Portugal. Another Spanish Benfica cyclist, Melcior Mauri, won the Volta ao Algarve.

In 2007, the newly created Benfica cycling team around superstar José Azevedo ended the 2007–2008 UCI Europe Tour in 27th with 622 points. In 2008, Rubén Plaza won the Vuelta a Valencia.

== Titles ==
=== National ===
- Volta a Portugal: 9
  - 1931, 1932, 1934, 1939, 1947, 1963, 1966, 1974, 1999
- Volta ao Algarve: 1
  - 1999

=== International ===
2007-08 UCI Europe Tour Teams Results

- 2007 Tour de Luxembourg: 5th
- 2008 Clásica Internacional de Alcobendas: 5th
- 2008 Volta a Portugal: 3rd
- 2008 GPCI Torres Vedras - Troféu Joaquim Agostinho:
- 2008 Volta ao Alentejo: 13th
- 2008 Grande Prémio Internacional CTT Correios: 6th
- 2008 GP Rota dos Móveis: 11th

2007-08 UCI Europe Tour Individual Wins

- 2008 Volta a la Comunitat Valenciana: Rubén Plaza
