= Ana Barros (cyclist) =

Portuguese cyclist

Personal information
- Full name: Ana de Oliveira Barros
- Born: 5 February 1973 (age 53) Portugal

Cycling career
- Sport: Cycling
- Discipline: Road cycling
- Role: Rider

Ana de Oliveira Barros (born 5 February 1973) is a road cyclist from Portugal. She represented her nation at the 1996 Summer Olympics in the women's road race.
