= Josep Jufré =

Spanish road bicycle racer

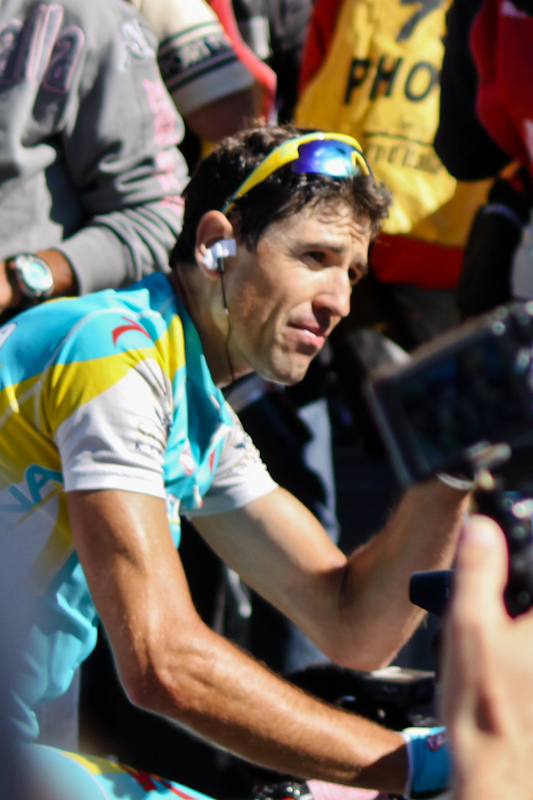

Personal information
- Full name: Josep Jufré Pou
- Born: 5 August 1975 (age 51) Santa Eulàlia de Riuprimer, Catalonia, Spain
- Height: 1.78 m (5 ft 10 in)
- Weight: 65 kg (143 lb)

Cycling career
- Sport: Cycling
- Current team: Retired
- Discipline: Road
- Role: Rider

Professional teams
- 1999–2002: Recer–Boavista
- 2003–2005: Colchon Relax–Fuenlabrada
- 2006–2007: Davitamon–Lotto
- 2008–2009: Saunier Duval–Scott
- 2010–2011: Astana

Josep Jufré Pou (born 5 August 1975) is a Spanish former professional road bicycle racer, who competed as a professional between 1999 and 2011. He turned professional with Recer–Boavista in 1999, and finished his career with Astana in 2011.

== Major results ==
2001
1st Stage 5 GP do Minho
3rd Overall GP Sport Noticias
2002
1st Clásica a los Puertos de Guadarrama
2003
2nd Overall Setmana Catalana de Ciclisme
4th Overall Vuelta a la Rioja
4th Overall Vuelta a Aragón
5th Overall Tour de Langkawi
2004
3rd Overall Vuelta a la Rioja
3rd Overall Setmana Catalana de Ciclisme
6th Overall Escalada a Montjuïc
8th Overall Volta a Catalunya
10th Overall Vuelta a Aragón
2005
6th Overall Vuelta a Burgos
2007
6th Hel van het Mergelland
2008
4th Overall Volta a Catalunya
8th Klasika Primavera
2009
10th Clásica de Almería
2010
5th Overall Vuelta a Murcia

=== Grand Tour general classification results timeline ===
| Grand Tour | 2003 | 2004 | 2005 | 2006 | 2007 | 2008 | 2009 | 2010 | 2011 |
|---|---|---|---|---|---|---|---|---|---|
| Giro d'Italia | — | — | — | 29 | 52 | — | — | 42 | 74 |
| Tour de France | — | — | — | — | — | DNF | — | — | — |
| Vuelta a España | 20 | 62 | 14 | DNF | DNF | — | — | 24 | 57 |

Legend
| — | Did not compete |
| DNF | Did not finish |
