= Antonino Dos Santos Baptista =

Portuguese cyclist

Personal information
- Born: 10 March 1933 Aguada de Cima, Portugal
- Died: 5 February 2013 (aged 79) Braga, Portugal

Cycling career
- Sport: Cycling
- Role: Rider

Antonino Dos Santos Baptista (10 March 1933 – 5 February 2013) was a Portuguese professional racing cyclist. He rode in three editions of the Tour de France, from 1958 to 1960.
