= Rapport Toer =

Race details
- Region: South Africa
- Discipline: Road
- Type: Stage race

History
- First edition: 1973
- Editions: 25
- Final edition: 2000
- First winner: Pierre-Luigi Tagliavini (ITA)
- Most wins: Robert McIntosh (RSA) (4 wins)
- Final winner: Tobias Steinhauser (GER)

The Rapport Toer was a multi-day road cycling race held annually in South Africa from 1973 to 2000.

The race was held as a professional event on the UCI calendar from 1993 to 2000.

== Winners ==
- 1973 : (Italy) Pierre-Luigi Tagliavini
- 1974 : (United Kingdom) Arthur Metcalfe
- 1975 : (Portugal) Fernando Mendes
- 1976 : (Portugal) Venceslau Fernandes
- 1977 : (South Africa) Robert McIntosh
- 1978 : (Portugal) Marco Chagas
- 1979 : (South Africa) Alan Diple
- 1980 : (South Africa) Jan van den Berg
- 1981 : (South Africa) Robert McIntosh
- 1982 : (South Africa) Alan van Heerden
- 1983 : (South Africa) Robert McIntosh
- 1984 : (South Africa) Ertjies Bezuidenhout
- 1985 : (South Africa) Mark Beneke
- 1986 : (South Africa) Robert McIntosh
- 1987 : (South Africa) Alan van Heerden
- 1988 : (South Africa) Gary Beneke
- 1989 : (South Africa) Lourens Smith
- 1990 : (South Africa) Willie Engelbrecht
- 1991 : (South Africa) Mark Beneke
- 1993 : (Germany) Steffan Gotschling
- 1994 : (Germany) Michael Rich
- 1995 : (Sweden) Michael Andersson
- 1996 : (United States) Scott Mercier
- 1999 : (Germany) Michael Rich
- 2000 : (Germany) Tobias Steinhauser
