= Mário Silva (cyclist) =

Portuguese cyclist

Personal information
- Born: 5 October 1939 Baixo Vouga, Portugal
- Died: 1 March 2023 (aged 82)

Cycling career
- Sport: Cycling

Mário Silva (5 October 1939 – 1 March 2023) was a Portuguese cyclist. He competed in the individual road race and team time trial events at the 1960 Summer Olympics.
