= Gonçalo Amorim =

Portuguese cyclist (1972-2012)

Personal information
- Full name: Gonçalo José Valada Amorim
- Born: 30 September 1972 Cartaxo, Portugal
- Died: 1 May 2012 (aged 39) Santarém, Portugal

Cycling career
- Sport: Cycling

Gonçalo José Valada Amorim (30 September 1972 – 1 May 2012) was a Portuguese cyclist. He competed in the men's individual road race at the 2004 Summer Olympics. Amorim killed himself with a shotgun in his home in 2012.
