= Joaquim Sampaio =

Portuguese sports shooter

Personal information
- Born: 30 August 1914
- Died: 15 May 1979 (aged 64)

Sport
- Sport: Sports shooting

Joaquim Sampaio (30 August 1914 – 15 May 1979) was a Portuguese sports shooter. He competed in two events at the 1952 Summer Olympics.
