= Francisco Valada =

Portuguese cyclist (1941–2021)

Personal information
- Born: 15 May 1941 Cartaxo, Cartaxo, Portugal
- Died: 23 December 2021 (aged 80)

Cycling career
- Sport: Cycling

Francisco Valada (15 May 1941 – 23 December 2021) was a Portuguese cyclist. He competed in the individual road race and team time trial events at the 1960 Summer Olympics.

Valada died on 23 December 2021, at the age of 80.
