= Volta ao Alentejo =

Portuguese multi-day road cycling race

Race details
- Date: Early spring
- Region: Alentejo, Portugal
- English name: Tour of Alentejo
- Local name: Volta ao Alentejo (in Portuguese)
- Discipline: Road
- Competition: UCI Europe Tour
- Type: Stage race
- Web site: www.voltaaoalentejo.com

History
- First edition: 1983
- Editions: 43 (as of 2026)
- First winner: Paulo Ferreira (POR)
- Most wins: Carlos Barbero (ESP); Orluis Aular (VEN) (2 wins)
- Most recent: Tiago Antunes (POR)

The Volta ao Alentejo (Portuguese; English: Tour of Alentejo) is a road bicycle racing stage race held annually in the Alentejo, Portugal. Since 2010, it has been organised as a 2.2 event on the UCI Europe Tour. From 2005 to 2009, the race was in category 2.1.

== Winners ==
Year	Country	Rider	Team
1983	Portugal	Paulo Ferreira	Lousa–Trinaranjus
1984	Portugal	Marco Chagas	Sporting–Raposeira
1985	Portugal	Adelino Teixeira	Lousa–Trinaranjus
1986	Portugal	Manuel Zeferino	Lousa–Trinaranjus
1987	Portugal	Joaquim Salgado	Garcia Joalheiro–LDA
1988	Portugal	Joaquim Gomes	Louletano–Vale do Lobo
1989	Portugal	Fernando Carvalho	Louletano–Vale do Lobo
1990	Spain	José Recio	Seur
1991	Spain	Jesús Blanco Villar	Lotus–Festina
1992	Portugal	António Pinto	Recer–Boavista
1993	Portugal	Jorge Silva	Sicasal–Acral
1994	Portugal	Carlos Carneiro	Sicasal–Acral
1995	Russia	Asiat Saitov	Artiach–Chiquilin
1996	Spain	Miguel Induráin	Banesto
1997	Spain	Aitor Garmendia	ONCE
1998	Spain	Melcior Mauri	ONCE
1999	Spain	José Luis Rubiera	Kelme–Costa Blanca
2000	Denmark	Claus Michael Møller	União Ciclista da Maia–MSS
2001	Hungary	László Bodrogi	Mapei–Quick-Step
2002	Portugal	Joaquim Andrade	Cantanhede–Marques de Marialva
2003	Russia	Andrei Zintchenko	LA Alumínios–Pecol–Bombarral
2004	Bulgaria	Danail Petrov	Carvalhelhos–Boavista
2005	Spain	Xavier Tondo	Catalunya–Ángel Mir
2006	Portugal	Sergio Ribeiro	Barbot–Halcon
2007	Spain	Manuel Vázquez	Andalucía–Cajasur
2008	Spain	Héctor Guerra	Liberty Seguros
2009	France	Maxime Bouet	Agritubel
2010	Spain	David Blanco	Palmeiras–Resort–Prio
2011	Lithuania	Evaldas Šiškevičius	La Pomme Marseille
2012	Russia	Alexey Kunshin	Lokosphinx
2013	Belgium	Jasper Stuyven	Bontrager Cycling Team
2014	Spain	Carlos Barbero	Euskadi
2015	Poland	Paweł Bernas	ActiveJet
2016	Spain	Enric Mas	Klein Constantia
2017	Spain	Carlos Barbero	Movistar Team
2018	Portugal	Luís Mendonça	Aviludo–Louletano
2019	Portugal	João Rodrigues	W52 / FC Porto
2020	No race due to COVID-19 pandemic in Portugal		
2021	Uruguay	Mauricio Moreira	Efapel
2022	Venezuela	Orluis Aular	Caja Rural–Seguros RGA
2023	Venezuela	Orluis Aular	Caja Rural–Seguros RGA
2024	Spain	Eduard Prades	Caja Rural–Seguros RGA
2025	Great Britain	Noah Hobbs	EF Education–Aevolo
2026	Portugal	Tiago Antunes	Efapel Cycling
