= José Pacheco (cyclist) =

Portuguese cyclist

Personal information
- Born: 14 February 1942 (age 84) Santo Tirso, Portugal
- Died: 3 May 2005

Cycling career
- Sport: Cycling

José Pacheco (born 14 February 1942) is a Portuguese former cyclist. He competed in the individual road race and team time trial events at the 1960 Summer Olympics.
