= Volta ao Algarve =

Portuguese multi-day road cycling race

Race details
- Date: February
- Region: Algarve, Portugal
- English name: Tour of the Algarve
- Local name: Volta ao Algarve (in Portuguese)
- Discipline: Road
- Competition: UCI ProSeries
- Type: Stage race
- Web site: voltaaoalgarve.com/en/home-2/

History
- First edition: 1960
- Editions: 52 (as of 2026)
- First winner: José Manuel Marques (POR)
- Most wins: Belmiro Silva (POR); Remco Evenepoel (BEL) (3 wins)
- Most recent: Juan Ayuso (ESP)

The Volta ao Algarve (Portuguese; English: Tour of the Algarve) is a road bicycle racing stage race held annually in the Algarve, Portugal. Since 2017, it has been organised as a 2.HC event on the UCI Europe Tour. The race became part of the new UCI ProSeries in 2020. Due to its early February position in the European calendar, it is used by many riders to prepare for the Spring Classics.

== Winners ==
Year	Country	Rider	Team
1960	Portugal	José Manuel Marques	Águias Alpiarça
1961	Portugal	António Pisco	Águias Alpiarça
1977	Portugal	Belmiro Silva	F.C. Porto
1978	Portugal	Joaquim Andrade	Águias–Clock
1979	Portugal	Firmino Bernardino	Lousa–Trinaranjus
1980	Portugal	Firmino Bernardino	Lousa–Trinaranjus
1981	Portugal	Belmiro Silva	F.C. Porto
1982	Portugal	Alexandre Ruas	Lousa–Trinaranjus
1983	Portugal	Adelino Teixeira	Lousa–Trinaranjus
1984	Portugal	Belmiro Silva	Ovarense
1985	Portugal	Eduardo Correia	Sporting Lisboa–Raposeira
1986	Portugal	Manuel Cunha	Lousa–Trinaranjus
1987	Portugal	Manuel Cunha	Sicasal–Torreense
1988	Portugal	Joaquim Gomes	Louletano–Vale do Lobo
1989	Portugal	Fernando Carvalho	Ruquita–Philips–Feirense
1990	Portugal	Fernando Carvalho	Ruquita–Philips–Feirense
1991	Portugal	Joaquim Andrade	Sicasal–Acral
1992	Portugal	Joaquim Gomes	Recer–Boavista
1993	Brazil	Cássio Freitas	Recer–Boavista
1994	Portugal	Vítor Gamito	Sicasal–Acral
1995	Brazil	Cássio Freitas	Recer–Boavista
1996	Portugal	Alberto Amaral	Troiamarisco
1997	Portugal	Cândido Barbosa	Maia–Jumbo–Cin
1998	Czech Republic	Tomas Konecny	ZVVZ
1999	Spain	Melcior Mauri	Benfica
2000	Switzerland	Alex Zülle	Banesto
2001	Italy	Andrea Ferrigato	Alessio
2002	Portugal	Cândido Barbosa	LA–Pecol
2003	Denmark	Claus Møller	Milaneza–MSS
2004	United States	Floyd Landis	U.S. Postal Service
2005	Portugal	Hugo Sabido	Paredes Rota dos Moveis
2006	Portugal	João Cabreira	Maia Milaneza
2007	Italy	Alessandro Petacchi	Team Milram
2008	Belgium	Stijn Devolder	Quick-Step
2009	Spain	Alberto Contador	Astana
2010	Spain	Alberto Contador	Astana
2011	Germany	Tony Martin	HTC–Highroad
2012	Australia	Richie Porte	Team Sky
2013	Germany	Tony Martin	Omega Pharma–Quick-Step
2014	Poland	Michał Kwiatkowski	Omega Pharma–Quick-Step
2015	Great Britain	Geraint Thomas	Team Sky
2016	Great Britain	Geraint Thomas	Team Sky
2017	Slovenia	Primož Roglič	LottoNL–Jumbo
2018	Poland	Michał Kwiatkowski	Team Sky
2019	Slovenia	Tadej Pogačar	UAE Team Emirates
2020	Belgium	Remco Evenepoel	Deceuninck–Quick-Step
2021	Portugal	João Rodrigues	W52 / FC Porto
2022	Belgium	Remco Evenepoel	Quick-Step Alpha Vinyl Team
2023	Colombia	Daniel Martínez	INEOS Grenadiers
2024	Belgium	Remco Evenepoel	Soudal–Quick-Step
2025	Denmark	Jonas Vingegaard	Visma–Lease a Bike
2026	Spain	Juan Ayuso	Lidl–Trek

=== Wins per country ===
Wins	Country
25	Portugal
4	Belgium; Spain
2	Brazil; Denmark; Germany; Great Britain; Italy; Poland; Slovenia
1	Australia; Colombia; Czech Republic; Switzerland; United States
