= Firmino Bernardino =

Portuguese cyclist

Personal information
- Born: 19 March 1950 (age 76)

Cycling career
- Sport: Cycling
- Role: Rider

Firmino Bernardino (born 19 March 1950) is a Portuguese racing cyclist. He rode in the 1975 Tour de France.
