= Feira dos Sofás–Boavista =

Portuguese cycling team

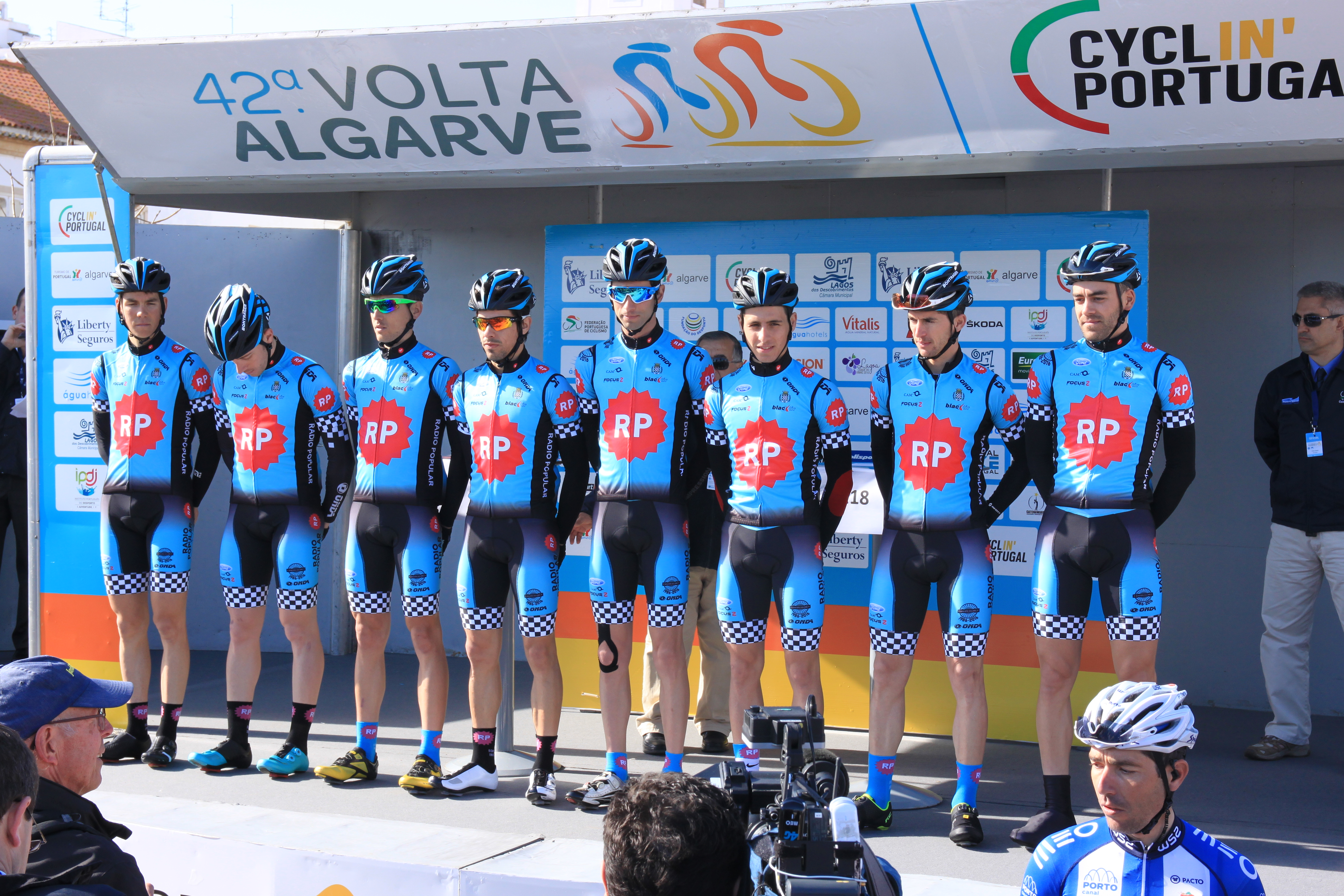
- The team at the 2016 Volta ao Algarve

Team information
- UCI code: RPB
- Registered: Portugal
- Founded: 1986
- Discipline: Road
- Status: Trade Team II (1996–2003); Trade Team III (2004); Continental (2005–)
- Bicycles: Cervélo
- Website: Team home page

Key personnel
- General manager: José Santos
- Team manager: Luis Machado

Team name history
- 1986 1986–1987 (Note: June 1986–1987) 1988 (Note: Jan–July 1988) 1988 (Note: From August 1988) 1989–1999 1998–1999 2000 2001–2006 2007 2008–2010 2011–2012 2013 2014 2015–2016 2017 2018–2021 2022–2025 2026–: Boavista F.C. Boavista F.C.–Zanussi; Boavista–Sportlis; Boavista–Sarcol; Recer–Boavista (BOA); Recer–Boavista (REC); Boavista (BOA); Carvalhelhos–Boavista (CAB); Riberalves–Boavista (RIB); Madeinox–Boavista (MAD); Onda (BOA); Rádio Popular–Onda (OND); Rádio Popular–Onda (BOA); Rádio Popular–Boavista (RPB); Rádio Popular–Boavista (BOA); Rádio Popular–Boavista (RPB); Rádio Popular–Paredes–Boavista
Jersey

Feira dos Sofás–Boavista is a Portuguese UCI Continental cycling team based in Porto. It is the cycling team of Boavista Futebol Clube, one of the most successful Portuguese sports club. It is one of the European teams in UCI Continental Tour and one of the oldest of the peloton, founded in 1986.

== Team roster ==
As of 16 February 2024.

Rider	Date of birth
Daniel Dias (POR)	29 July 2001 (age 25)
César Fonte (POR)	10 December 1986 (age 39)
Hélder Gonçalves (POR)	16 June 2000 (age 26)
Tiago Leal (POR)	22 October 1999 (age 26)
João Martins (POR)	27 March 2004 (age 22)

Rider	Date of birth
Hugo Nunes (POR)	17 November 1996 (age 29)
Tiago Nunes (POR)	14 January 2004 (age 22)
Francisco Joel Peñuela (VEN)	1 February 2001 (age 25)
Raúl Rota (ESP)	18 November 1999 (age 26)
André Soares (POR)	22 April 1999 (age 27)

== Major wins ==
1998
Stage 2 Volta ao Algarve, Saulius Šarkauskas
Stage 4b Troféu Joaquim Agostinho, Saulius Šarkauskas
Young rider classification Volta a Portugal, Pedro Andrade

Stage 9, José Luis Rebollo

1999
Stage 5 GP Torres Vedras, Delmino Pereira
2000
Portugal Road Race Championships, Marco Morais
Stage 3 Volta ao Alentejo, Pedro Soeiro
Stage 3 GP Jornal de Noticias, Delmino Pereira
2001
Overall GP Torres Vedras, Adrián Palomares
Stage 5 GP do Minho, Josep Jufré
2002
Overall GP Torres Vedras, David Bernabeu

Stage 3, David Bernabeu

Clásica a los Puertos, Josep Jufré
Tour du Finistère, David Bernabeu
2003
Melbourne to Warrnambool Classic, Simon Gerrans
Portugal Road Race Championships, Pedro Soeiro
Australia Time Trial Championships, Ben Day
Stage 9 Volta a Portugal, Pedro Arreitunandia
2004
Overall Volta ao Alentejo, Danail Petrov

Stage 3, Danail Petrov
Stage 5, Joaquim Sampaio

Stage 1 GP Torres Vedras, Danail Petrov
GP Area Metropolitana de Vigo, Pedro Soeiro
2005
Stage 3 Volta de São Paulo, Pedro Soeiro
Stage 1 Volta ao Alentejo, Pedro Soeiro
Stage 4 GP Torres Vedras, André Vital
2006
Stage 2 Volta a Portugal, Manuel Cardoso
GP Area Metropoli, Jacek Morajko
Stage 7 Herald Sun Tour, Ben Day
2007
Stage 2 Vuelta a Extremadura, Joaquim Sampaio
Stages 4 & 5 Vuelta a Extremadura, Manuel Cardoso
2008
Overall GP Torres Vedras, Tiago Machado
2009
Portugal Time Trial Championships, Tiago Machado
Stage 2 Vuelta a Extremadura, Bruno Lima
2010
Bulgaria Road Race Championships, Danail Petrov
Portugal Time Trial Championships, Sergio Sousa
2011
Portugal Road Race Championships, João Cabreira
Stage 1 Volta ao Alentejo, Bruno Lima
2012
Portugal Time Trial Championships, José Gonçalves
2013
Stage 1 Volta ao Alentejo, Daniel Silva
2014
Stage 7 Volta a Portugal, Rui Sousa
2015
Portuguese Under 23 Road Race, Nuno Bico
2017
Portuguese National Time Trial, Domingos Gonçalves
Stage 4 Troféu Joaquim Agostinho, João Benta
Stage 6 Volta a Portugal, Rui Sousa
2018
Portuguese National Time Trial, Domingos Gonçalves
Portuguese National Road Race, Domingos Gonçalves
Stage 3 GP Nacional 2 de Portugal, Óscar Pelegrí
Stage 6 Volta a Portugal, Domingos Gonçalves
2019
Stage 7 Volta a Portugal, Luis Gomes
Stage 8 Volta a Portugal, João Benta
