= Liberty Seguros Continental =

Team information
- UCI code: LSE
- Registered: Portugal
- Founded: 1996
- Disbanded: 2009
- Discipline: Road
- Status: Continental

Key personnel
- Team manager: Américo Silva

Team name history
- 1958–1960 1977–1978 1996–1997 1998–1999 2000–2002 2003–2004 2005–2006 2007–2009: Águias de Alpiarça; Águias/Clok; LA Aluminios-AC Malveira; LA Aluminios-Pecol-Águias de Alpiarça; LA Aluminios-Pecol-Calbrita; LA Aluminios-Pecol-Bombarral; LA Aluminios-Liberty Seguros; Liberty Seguros
Jersey

The Liberty Seguros Continental professional cycling team was a Portuguese team based in Bombarral. It was one of the European teams in UCI Continental Tour, but it was dismantled at the end of 2009 due to a doping scandal.

== History ==
=== Foundation and early years ===
Although there was a cycling team competing at the beginning of the second half of the 20th century, the professional cycling team was founded for the 1996 season with the sponsorship of Portuguese aluminium company, LA Pecol. The group became one of the most important Portuguese squads, developing a great rivalry with Maia, another great Portuguese team.

The team participated in the 2000 Vuelta a España and Andrei Zinchenko won the 14th stage, which ended in Lagos de Covadonga. The victory of the Russian, (winner of three stages in 1998), was the first victory of a Portuguese team in the history of the Vuelta. In 2001 the team was not invited to participate in the Vuelta a España, so it pretty much just competed in the Portuguese calendar. The great rival of the LA Pecol–Bombarral the Milaneza-Maia, raced in the Vuelta (something that had not happened in the previous year). After the 2004 season, the sponsor Pecol left the team, ending the designation LA Pecol.

=== Arrival of Liberty and departure of LA ===
With a new organization of cycling teams since 2005, the team was designated as UCI Continental category (below categories ProTour and UCI Professional Continental, the first and second highest categories, respectively). Also that season the team received a new sponsor, the multinational Liberty Seguros, as part of the agreement, cyclists Nuno Ribeiro and Sérgio Paulinho moved to the Spanish team Liberty Seguros–Würth, a ProTour cycling team run by Manolo Saiz.

In 2006, as a result of Operación Puerto, Liberty Seguros withdrew its sponsorship of the Spanish team, and the Portuguese team was the only team sponsored by the insurer. In 2007 the team stopped being sponsored by LA Aluminios (now to the ancient Milaneza-Maia with MSS), with the team leaving the designation LA Aluminium Liberty Seguros and becoming just Liberty Seguros.

=== Doping and extinction ===
On 18 September 2009, it was announced that three cyclists, Héctor Guerra, Isidro Nozal and Nuno Ribeiro had tested positive for CERA at the 2009 Volta a Portugal. On 21 October, the UCI announced that the counter-analysis confirmed the positive control for all cyclists. This doping case led Liberty Seguros to withdraw the sponsorship of the team, which led to its extinction as a professional team. The team did continue as an elite level domestic team for a further three seasons before folding in 2012.

== Honors 2006 ==
Date	Tour	Runner
5 August	Stage 1 Volta a Portugal	Cândido Barbosa
8 August	Stage 4 Volta a Portugal	Carlos Nozal Vega

== 2007 team ==
Name	DOB	Nationality
Cândido Barbosa	31 December 1974	Portugal
Hernani Brocco	13 June 1981	Portugal
Filipe Cardoso	15 May 1984	Portugal
Jordi Grau Sogas	31 July 1981	Portugal
Héctor Guerra	6 August 1978	Spain
António Jesus	20 January 1984	Portugal
Carlos Nozal Vega	15 May 1981	Spain
Luís Pinheiro	5 June 1980	Portugal
César Antunes Quiterio	20 July 1976	Portugal
Nuno Ribeiro	9 September 1977	Portugal
Vitor Rodrigues	9 March 1986	Portugal
Rui Sousa	17 July 1976	Portugal
Pablo Urtasun	29 March 1980	Spain
