= Sporting CP (cycling team) =

Sporting Clube de Portugal
Team information
- Registered: Portugal
- Founded: 1911
- Discipline: Road

Team name history
- 1911–1962 1963–1974 1975 1984–1986 1987 2009–2010: Sporting; Sporting–Gazcidla; Sporting–Sottomayor; Sporting–Raposeira; Sporting–Vitalis; Sporting
Jersey

Sporting Clube de Portugal is a Portuguese professional cycling team that existed from 1911 to 2010 and was refounded in 2020. It is part of the Sporting Clube de Portugal sports club based in Lisbon. It participated in the 1975 and 1984 editions of the Tour de France, with Paulo Ferreira's victory in the fifth stage in 1984 the team's sole win of the race.

Between 2016 and 2019, Sporting had a protocol with CC Tavira and the team was called "Sporting-Tavira".
