= Sicasal–Acral =

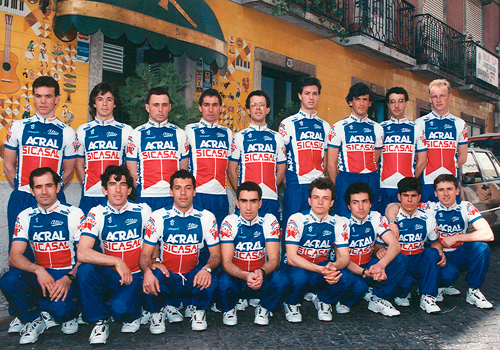
- The 1992 team

Team information
- UCI code: SIC
- Registered: Portugal
- Founded: 1986
- Disbanded: 1995
- Discipline: Road
- Bicycles: Altis

Key personnel
- Team managers: João Henrique Roque dos Santos; Leonel Miranda

Team name history
- 1986 1987–1989 1990–1995: Torreense–Sicasal; Sicasal–Torreense; Sicasal–Acral

Sicasal–Acral was a Portuguese professional road cycling team that existed from 1986 until 1995. The team competed in eight editions of the Vuelta a España, as well as the 1995 Giro d'Italia. This made the team the first and only Portuguese team so far ride in the Giro d'Italia.
