= List of teams and cyclists in the 1974 Vuelta a España =

For the 1974 Vuelta a España, the field consisted of 88 riders; 55 finished the race.

== By rider ==
Legend
No.	Starting number worn by the rider during the Vuelta
Pos.	Position in the general classification
Time	Deficit to the winner of the general classification
DNF	Denotes a rider who did not finish

No.	Name	Nationality	Team	Pos.	Time	Ref
1	José Antonio González	Spain	Kas	6	+ 5' 56"	
2	Francisco Elorriaga	Spain	Kas	16	+ 14' 01"	
3	Domingo Perurena	Spain	Kas	5	+ 4' 29"	
4	José Manuel Fuente	Spain	Kas	1	84h 48' 18"	
5	Santiago Lazcano	Spain	Kas	20	+ 18' 03"	
6	Miguel María Lasa	Spain	Kas	3	+ 1' 09"	
7	Antonio Menéndez	Spain	Kas	14	+ 12' 28"	
8	José Pesarrodona	Spain	Kas	37	+ 43' 28"	
9	Juan Manuel Santisteban	Spain	Kas	39	+ 46' 41"	
10	José Luis Uribezubia	Spain	Kas	8	+ 6' 33"	
11	Roger Swerts	Belgium	IJsboerke–Colner	10	+ 8' 28"	
12	Rik Van Linden	Belgium	IJsboerke–Colner	DNF	—	
13	Raymond Steegmans	Belgium	IJsboerke–Colner	DNF	—	
14	Julien Stevens	Belgium	IJsboerke–Colner	34	+ 37' 55"	
15	Willy In 't Ven	Belgium	IJsboerke–Colner	31	+ 34' 36"	
16	Ronny Van De Vijver	Belgium	IJsboerke–Colner	35	+ 38' 39"	
17	Louis Verreydt	Belgium	IJsboerke–Colner	DNF	—	
18	Ludo Van Der Linden	Belgium	IJsboerke–Colner	50	+ 1h 07' 39"	
19	Eddy Reyniers	Belgium	IJsboerke–Colner	DNF	—	
20	Willy Govaerts	Belgium	IJsboerke–Colner	45	+ 1h 00' 18"	
21	Joaquim Agostinho	Portugal	Bic	2	+ 11"	
22	Luis Balagué	Spain	Bic	30	+ 33' 05"	
23	Patrice Collinet	France	Bic	DNF	—	
24	Luis Ocaña	Spain	Bic	4	+ 1' 58"	
25	Gerben Karstens	Netherlands	Bic	48	+ 1h 05' 03"	
26	Eddy Peelman	Belgium	Bic	55	+ 1h 57' 59"	
27	Sylvain Vasseur	France	Bic	27	+ 29' 00"	
28	Johny Schleck	Luxembourg	Bic	DNF	—	
29	Alain Vasseur	France	Bic	DNF	—	
30	Bernard Croyet	France	Bic	DNF	—	
31	Raymond Delisle	France	Peugeot–BP	DNF	—	
32	Régis Ovion	France	Peugeot–BP	15	+ 13' 37"	
33	Jean-Pierre Danguillaume	France	Peugeot–BP	7	+ 6' 29"	
34	Bernard Thévenet	France	Peugeot–BP	DNF	—	
35	Jürgen Tschan	West Germany	Peugeot–BP	DNF	—	
36	Claude Aiguesparses	France	Peugeot–BP	49	+ 1h 07' 09"	
37	André Mollet	France	Peugeot–BP	29	+ 32' 22"	
38	Bernard Bourreau	France	Peugeot–BP	36	+ 39' 17"	
39	Jean-Pierre Guitard	France	Peugeot–BP	43	+ 56' 13"	
40	Guy Sibille	France	Peugeot–BP	38	+ 46' 31"	
41	Jan Van De Wiele	Belgium	MIC–de Gribaldy–Ludo	18	+ 16' 52"	
42	Eric Leman	Belgium	MIC–de Gribaldy–Ludo	22	+ 22' 37"	
43	Freddy Libouton	Belgium	MIC–de Gribaldy–Ludo	54	+ 1h 51' 01"	
44	Noël Van Clooster	Belgium	MIC–de Gribaldy–Ludo	23	+ 26' 45"	
45	Erny Kirchen	Luxembourg	MIC–de Gribaldy–Ludo	DNF	—	
46	Christian Rieu	France	MIC–de Gribaldy–Ludo	DNF	—	
47	Ronny Vanmarcke	Belgium	MIC–de Gribaldy–Ludo	46	+ 1h 03' 13"	
49	Joaquim Andrade	Portugal	MIC–de Gribaldy–Ludo	26	+ 28' 52"	
50	Yvan Benaets	Belgium	MIC–de Gribaldy–Ludo	DNF	—	
51	Fernando Mendes	Portugal	Coelima–Benfica	11	+ 8' 32"	
52	Venceslau Fernandes	Portugal	Coelima–Benfica	25	+ 27' 13"	
53	José Madeira	Portugal	Coelima–Benfica	DNF	—	
54	Joaquim Leite	Portugal	Coelima–Benfica	47	+ 1h 03' 46"	
55	Antonio Martins Lopes	Portugal	Coelima–Benfica	DNF	—	
56	José Maria Nunes	Portugal	Coelima–Benfica	DNF	—	
57	César Aires	Portugal	Coelima–Benfica	42	+ 53' 52"	
58	Jorge Fernandes	Portugal	Coelima–Benfica	DNF	—	
59	Agustín Tamames	Spain	Coelima–Benfica	17	+ 14' 55"	
60	José Freitas Martins	Portugal	Coelima–Benfica	DNF	—	
61	José Luis Abilleira	Spain	La Casera	13	+ 9' 31"	
62	Jesús Manzaneque	Spain	La Casera	24	+ 27' 07"	
63	Andrés Oliva	Spain	La Casera	DNF	—	
64	José Viejo	Spain	La Casera	DNF	—	
65	Pedro Torres	Spain	La Casera	DNF	—	
66	Juan Santiago Zurano Jerez	Spain	La Casera	19	+ 17' 48"	
67	José Antonio Pontón Ruiz	Spain	La Casera	21	+ 19' 48"	
68	Manuel Esparza	Spain	La Casera	41	+ 50' 52"	
69	Fernando Plaza Labiano	Spain	La Casera	40	+ 47' 45"	
70	Antonio Vallori	Spain	La Casera	12	+ 9' 23"	
71	Bernard Guyot	France	Magiglace–Juaneda	DNF	—	
72	Marcel Boishardy	France	Magiglace–Juaneda	DNF	—	
73	Noël Geneste	France	Magiglace–Juaneda	DNF	—	
74	Charles Genthon	France	Magiglace–Juaneda	DNF	—	
75	Jacques-André Hochart	France	Magiglace–Juaneda	DNF	—	
76	Martin Martinez	France	Magiglace–Juaneda	53	+ 1h 22' 26"	
77	Pierre Tosi	France	Magiglace–Juaneda	DNF	—	
78	Roger Legeay	France	Magiglace–Juaneda	32	+ 34' 58"	
79	Claude le Chatellier	France	Magiglace–Juaneda	DNF	—	
80	Giovanni Jiménez Ocampo	Colombia	Magiglace–Juaneda	DNF	—	
81	Ventura Díaz	Spain	Monteverde	9	+ 8' 25"	
82	José Casas García	Spain	Monteverde	33	+ 35' 50"	
83	Germán Martín Sáez	Spain	Monteverde	DNF	—	
84	Antonio Alcón González	Spain	Monteverde	28	+ 31' 54"	
85	Manuel Antonio García	Spain	Monteverde	44	+ 1h 00' 13"	
86	Eufronio Enrique Sahagún Santos	Spain	Monteverde	51	+ 1h 07' 51"	
87	José Palop	Spain	Monteverde	DNF	—	
88	Francisco Luis Esclapes Parada	Spain	Monteverde	DNF	—	
89	Joaquín Pérez Soliva	Spain	Monteverde	52	+ 1h 20' 31"	
