= 1974 Vuelta a España, Stage 11 to Stage 19b =

Cycling race stages

The 1974 Vuelta a España was the 29th edition of the Vuelta a España, one of cycling's Grand Tours. The Vuelta began in Almería, with a prologue individual time trial on 23 April, and Stage 11 occurred on 4 May with a stage from Ávila. The race finished in San Sebastián on 12 May.

== Stage 11 ==
4 May 1974 - Ávila to Valladolid, 168 km (104.4 mi)

Stage 11 result

Rank	Rider	Team	Time
1	José Luis Uribezubia (ESP)	Kas–Kaskol	4h 37' 10"
2	Domingo Perurena (ESP)	Kas–Kaskol	+ 14"
3	Gerben Karstens (NED)	Bic	+ 18"
4	Francisco Elorriaga (ESP)	Kas–Kaskol	+ 24"
5	Miguel María Lasa (ESP)	Kas–Kaskol	s.t.
6	José Casas García (ESP)	Monteverde	s.t.
7	Joaquim Agostinho (POR)	Bic	s.t.
8	Eric Leman (BEL)	MIC–Ludo–de Gribaldy	s.t.
9	Roger Swerts (BEL)	IJsboerke–Colner	s.t.
10	Freddy Libouton (BEL)	MIC–Ludo–de Gribaldy	s.t.

General classification after Stage 11

Rank	Rider	Team	Time
1	José Manuel Fuente (ESP)	Kas–Kaskol	52h 22' 29"
2	Miguel María Lasa (ESP)	Kas–Kaskol	+ 24"
3	Raymond Delisle (FRA)	Peugeot–BP–Michelin	+ 28"
4	Domingo Perurena (ESP)	Kas–Kaskol	+ 29"
5	Luis Ocaña (ESP)	Bic	+ 1' 04"
6	Joaquim Agostinho (POR)	Bic	+ 1' 15"
7	Bernard Thévenet (FRA)	Peugeot–BP–Michelin	+ 1' 22"
8	José Luis Abilleira (ESP)	La Casera	+ 2' 34"
9	José Luis Uribezubia (ESP)	Kas–Kaskol	+ 2' 50"
10	José Antonio González (ESP)	Kas–Kaskol	+ 2' 53"

== Stage 12 ==
5 May 1974 - Valladolid to León, 203 km (126.1 mi)

Stage 12 result

Rank	Rider	Team	Time
1	Roger Swerts (BEL)	IJsboerke–Colner	5h 48' 35"
2	Jesús Manzaneque (ESP)	La Casera	+ 10"
3	Francisco Elorriaga (ESP)	Kas–Kaskol	+ 16"
4	Gerben Karstens (NED)	Bic	+ 21"
5	Domingo Perurena (ESP)	Kas–Kaskol	s.t.
6	Guy Sibille (FRA)	Peugeot–BP–Michelin	s.t.
7	Eric Leman (BEL)	MIC–Ludo–de Gribaldy	s.t.
8	Miguel María Lasa (ESP)	Kas–Kaskol	s.t.
9	Régis Ovion (FRA)	Peugeot–BP–Michelin	s.t.
10	Freddy Libouton (BEL)	MIC–Ludo–de Gribaldy	s.t.

General classification after Stage 12

Rank	Rider	Team	Time
1	José Manuel Fuente (ESP)	Kas–Kaskol	58h 11' 25"
2	Miguel María Lasa (ESP)	Kas–Kaskol	+ 24"
3	Raymond Delisle (FRA)	Peugeot–BP–Michelin	+ 28"
4	Domingo Perurena (ESP)	Kas–Kaskol	+ 29"
5	Luis Ocaña (ESP)	Bic	+ 1' 04"
6	Joaquim Agostinho (POR)	Bic	+ 1' 15"
7	Bernard Thévenet (FRA)	Peugeot–BP–Michelin	+ 2' 12"
8	José Luis Uribezubia (ESP)	Kas–Kaskol	+ 2' 50"
9	José Antonio González (ESP)	Kas–Kaskol	+ 2' 53"
10	José Luis Abilleira (ESP)	La Casera	+ 2' 57"

== Stage 13 ==
6 May 1974 - León to Monte Naranco, 128 km (80 mi)

Stage 13 result

Rank	Rider	Team	Time
1	José Manuel Fuente (ESP)	Kas–Kaskol	3h 28' 06"
2	Miguel María Lasa (ESP)	Kas–Kaskol	+ 1' 00"
3	Antonio Menéndez (ESP)	Kas–Kaskol	+ 1' 11"
4	Domingo Perurena (ESP)	Kas–Kaskol	+ 1' 39"
5	Jan Van De Wiele (BEL)	MIC–Ludo–de Gribaldy	s.t.
6	Jean-Pierre Danguillaume (FRA)	Peugeot–BP–Michelin	s.t.
7	José Antonio González (ESP)	Kas–Kaskol	1' 41"
8	Joaquim Agostinho (POR)	Bic	s.t.
9	Jesús Manzaneque (ESP)	La Casera	s.t.
10	José Luis Uribezubia (ESP)	Kas–Kaskol	s.t.

== Stage 14 ==
7 May 1974 - Oviedo to Cangas de Onís, 134 km (83 mi)

Stage 14 result

Rank	Rider	Team	Time
1	Joaquim Agostinho (POR)	Bic	3h 38' 16"
2	José Manuel Fuente (ESP)	Kas–Kaskol	+ 5"
3	José Madeira (POR)	Coelima–Benfica	+ 26"
4	Luis Ocaña (ESP)	Bic	s.t.
5	Guy Sibille (FRA)	Peugeot–BP–Michelin	+ 39"
6	Fernando Mendes (POR)	Coelima–Benfica	s.t.
7	José Casas García (ESP)	Monteverde	s.t.
8	Domingo Perurena (ESP)	Kas–Kaskol	s.t.
9	Miguel María Lasa (ESP)	Kas–Kaskol	s.t.
10	José Antonio González (ESP)	Kas–Kaskol	s.t.

General classification after Stage 14

Rank	Rider	Team	Time
1	José Manuel Fuente (ESP)	Kas–Kaskol	65h 17' 42"
2	Miguel María Lasa (ESP)	Kas–Kaskol	+ 2' 08"
3	Joaquim Agostinho (POR)	Bic	+ 2' 41"
4	Domingo Perurena (ESP)	Kas–Kaskol	+ 2' 52"
5	Luis Ocaña (ESP)	Bic	+ 3' 26"
6	José Luis Uribezubia (ESP)	Kas–Kaskol	+ 5' 15"
7	José Antonio González (ESP)	Kas–Kaskol	+ 5' 18"
8	José Luis Abilleira (ESP)	La Casera	+ 6' 34"
9	Jean-Pierre Danguillaume (FRA)	Peugeot–BP–Michelin	+ 6' 59"
10	Antonio Vallori (ESP)	La Casera	+ 7' 00"

== Stage 15 ==
8 May 1974 - Cangas de Onís to Laredo, 210 km (130 mi)

Stage 15 result

Rank	Rider	Team	Time
1	Juan Manuel Santisteban (ESP)	Kas–Kaskol	6h 20' 10"
2	Venceslau Fernandes (POR)	Coelima–Benfica	+ 5' 43"
3	Antonio Alcón González (ESP)	Monteverde	+ 11' 23"
4	Eric Leman (BEL)	MIC–Ludo–de Gribaldy	+ 11' 58"
5	Guy Sibille (FRA)	Peugeot–BP–Michelin	s.t.
6	Francisco Elorriaga (ESP)	Kas–Kaskol	s.t.
7	Freddy Libouton (BEL)	MIC–Ludo–de Gribaldy	s.t.
8	Gerben Karstens (NED)	Bic	s.t.
9	Noël Van Clooster (BEL)	MIC–Ludo–de Gribaldy	s.t.
10	Domingo Perurena (ESP)	Kas–Kaskol	s.t.

General classification after Stage 15

Rank	Rider	Team	Time
1	José Manuel Fuente (ESP)	Kas–Kaskol	71h 49' 50"
2	Miguel María Lasa (ESP)	Kas–Kaskol	+ 2' 08"
3	Joaquim Agostinho (POR)	Bic	+ 2' 41"
4	Domingo Perurena (ESP)	Kas–Kaskol	+ 2' 52"
5	Luis Ocaña (ESP)	Bic	+ 3' 26"
6	José Luis Uribezubia (ESP)	Kas–Kaskol	+ 5' 15"
7	José Antonio González (ESP)	Kas–Kaskol	+ 5' 18"
8	José Luis Abilleira (ESP)	La Casera	+ 6' 34"
9	Jean-Pierre Danguillaume (FRA)	Peugeot–BP–Michelin	+ 6' 59"
10	Antonio Vallori (ESP)	La Casera	+ 7' 00"

== Stage 16 ==
9 May 1974 - Laredo to Bilbao, 133 km (83 mi)

Stage 16 result

Rank	Rider	Team	Time
1	Gerben Karstens (NED)	Bic	3h 37' 03"
2	Domingo Perurena (ESP)	Kas–Kaskol	+ 10"
3	Jean-Pierre Danguillaume (FRA)	Peugeot–BP–Michelin	+ 14"
4	Roger Swerts (BEL)	IJsboerke–Colner	+ 20"
5	Miguel María Lasa (ESP)	Kas–Kaskol	s.t.
6	Eric Leman (BEL)	MIC–Ludo–de Gribaldy	s.t.
7	Noël Van Clooster (BEL)	MIC–Ludo–de Gribaldy	s.t.
8	Francisco Elorriaga (ESP)	Kas–Kaskol	s.t.
9	Ronny Van De Vijver (BEL)	IJsboerke–Colner	s.t.
10	Régis Ovion (FRA)	Peugeot–BP–Michelin	s.t.

General classification after Stage 16

Rank	Rider	Team	Time
1	José Manuel Fuente (ESP)	Kas–Kaskol	75h 26' 53"
2	Miguel María Lasa (ESP)	Kas–Kaskol	+ 2' 08"
3	Joaquim Agostinho (POR)	Bic	+ 2' 41"
4	Domingo Perurena (ESP)	Kas–Kaskol	+ 2' 42"
5	Luis Ocaña (ESP)	Bic	+ 3' 26"
6	José Luis Uribezubia (ESP)	Kas–Kaskol	+ 5' 15"
7	José Antonio González (ESP)	Kas–Kaskol	+ 5' 18"
8	José Luis Abilleira (ESP)	La Casera	+ 6' 34"
9	Jean-Pierre Danguillaume (FRA)	Peugeot–BP–Michelin	+ 6' 55"
10	Antonio Vallori (ESP)	La Casera	+ 7' 00"

== Stage 17 ==
10 May 1974 - Bilbao to Miranda de Ebro, 157 km (98 mi)

Stage 17 result

Rank	Rider	Team	Time
1	Agustín Tamames (ESP)	Coelima–Benfica	4h 38' 57"
2	Régis Ovion (FRA)	Peugeot–BP–Michelin	+ 12"
3	Jean-Pierre Danguillaume (FRA)	Peugeot–BP–Michelin	+ 26"
4	Juan Santiago Zurano Jerez (ESP)	La Casera	s.t.
5	Fernando Mendes (POR)	Coelima–Benfica	+ 29"
6	André Mollet (FRA)	Peugeot–BP–Michelin	+ 30"
7	Francisco Elorriaga (ESP)	Kas–Kaskol	s.t.
8	Roger Swerts (BEL)	IJsboerke–Colner	s.t.
9	Joaquim Agostinho (POR)	Bic	s.t.
10	Eric Leman (BEL)	MIC–Ludo–de Gribaldy	s.t.

General classification after Stage 17

Rank	Rider	Team	Time
1	José Manuel Fuente (ESP)	Kas–Kaskol	80h 06' 20"
2	Miguel María Lasa (ESP)	Kas–Kaskol	+ 1' 08"
3	Joaquim Agostinho (POR)	Bic	+ 2' 41"
4	Domingo Perurena (ESP)	Kas–Kaskol	+ 2' 42"
5	Luis Ocaña (ESP)	Bic	+ 3' 26"
6	José Luis Uribezubia (ESP)	Kas–Kaskol	+ 5' 15"
7	José Antonio González (ESP)	Kas–Kaskol	+ 5' 18"
8	Jean-Pierre Danguillaume (FRA)	Peugeot–BP–Michelin	+ 6' 51"
9	José Luis Abilleira (ESP)	La Casera	s.t.
10	Antonio Vallori (ESP)	La Casera	+ 7' 00"

== Stage 18 ==
11 May 1974 - Miranda de Ebro to Eibar, 152 km (94 mi)

Stage 18 result

Rank	Rider	Team	Time
1	Agustín Tamames (ESP)	Coelima–Benfica	2h 59' 23"
2	Miguel María Lasa (ESP)	Kas–Kaskol	+ 25"
3	Luis Ocaña (ESP)	Bic	+ 47"
4	Joaquim Agostinho (POR)	Bic	+ 55"
5	Jean-Pierre Danguillaume (FRA)	Peugeot–BP–Michelin	+ 1' 01"
6	José Manuel Fuente (ESP)	Kas–Kaskol	s.t.
7	André Mollet (FRA)	Peugeot–BP–Michelin	+ 1' 28"
8	Domingo Perurena (ESP)	Kas–Kaskol	+ 1' 34"
9	Francisco Elorriaga (ESP)	Kas–Kaskol	s.t.
10	José Luis Uribezubia (ESP)	Kas–Kaskol	s.t.

General classification after Stage 18

Rank	Rider	Team	Time
1	José Manuel Fuente (ESP)	Kas–Kaskol	84h 06' 44"
2	Miguel María Lasa (ESP)	Kas–Kaskol	+ 1' 32"
3	Joaquim Agostinho (POR)	Bic	+ 2' 35"
4	Luis Ocaña (ESP)	Bic	+ 3' 12"
5	Domingo Perurena (ESP)	Kas–Kaskol	+ 3' 15"
6	José Luis Uribezubia (ESP)	Kas–Kaskol	+ 5' 48"
7	José Antonio González (ESP)	Kas–Kaskol	+ 6' 32"
8	Jean-Pierre Danguillaume (FRA)	Peugeot–BP–Michelin	+ 6' 47"
9	Antonio Vallori (ESP)	La Casera	+ 7' 36"
10	Ventura Díaz (ESP)	Monteverde	+ 7' 59"

== Stage 19a ==
12 May 1974 - Eibar to San Sebastián, 79 km (49 mi)

Stage 19a result

Rank	Rider	Team	Time
1	José Casas García (ESP)	Monteverde	1h 45' 02"
2	Gerben Karstens (NED)	Bic	+ 6' 30"
3	Domingo Perurena (ESP)	Kas–Kaskol	+ 6' 33"
4	Francisco Elorriaga (ESP)	Kas–Kaskol	+ 6' 35"
5	Guy Sibille (FRA)	Peugeot–BP–Michelin	+ 6' 35"
6	Juan Santiago Zurano Jerez (ESP)	La Casera	+ 6' 35"
7	Martin Martinez (FRA)	Magiglace–Juaneda	+ 6' 35"
8	Santiago Lazcano (ESP)	Kas–Kaskol	+ 6' 35"
9	Ronny Vanmarcke (BEL)	MIC–Ludo–de Gribaldy	+ 6' 35"
10	Régis Ovion (FRA)	Peugeot–BP–Michelin	+ 6' 35"

== Stage 19b ==
12 May 1974 - San Sebastián to San Sebastián, 35.9 km (22.3 mi) (ITT)

Stage 19b result

Rank	Rider	Team	Time
1	Joaquim Agostinho (POR)	Bic	47' 33"
2	Luis Ocaña (ESP)	Bic	+ 1' 10"
3	Roger Swerts (BEL)	IJsboerke–Colner	+ 1' 13"
4	José Antonio González (ESP)	Kas–Kaskol	+ 1' 48"
5	Miguel María Lasa (ESP)	Kas–Kaskol	+ 2' 01"
6	Agustín Tamames (ESP)	Coelima–Benfica	+ 2' 04"
7	Jean-Pierre Danguillaume (FRA)	Peugeot–BP–Michelin	+ 2' 06"
8	Fernando Mendes (POR)	Coelima–Benfica	+ 2' 15"
9	José Manuel Fuente (ESP)	Kas–Kaskol	+ 2' 24"
10	Julien Stevens (BEL)	IJsboerke–Colner	+ 2' 43"

General classification after Stage 19b

Rank	Rider	Team	Time
1	José Manuel Fuente (ESP)	Kas–Kaskol	86h 48' 18"
2	Joaquim Agostinho (POR)	Bic	+ 11"
3	Miguel María Lasa (ESP)	Kas–Kaskol	+ 1' 09"
4	Luis Ocaña (ESP)	Bic	+ 1' 58"
5	Domingo Perurena (ESP)	Kas–Kaskol	+ 4' 29"
6	José Antonio González (ESP)	Kas–Kaskol	+ 5' 56"
7	Jean-Pierre Danguillaume (FRA)	Peugeot–BP–Michelin	+ 6' 29"
8	José Luis Uribezubia (ESP)	Kas–Kaskol	+ 6' 38"
9	Ventura Díaz (ESP)	Monteverde	+ 8' 22"
10	Roger Swerts (BEL)	IJsboerke–Colner	+ 8' 25"
