= 1974 Vuelta a España, Prologue to Stage 10b =

Cycling race stages

The 1974 Vuelta a España was the 29th edition of the Vuelta a España, one of cycling's Grand Tours. The Vuelta began in Almería, with a prologue individual time trial on 23 April, and Stage 10b occurred on 3 May with a stage to Ávila. The race finished in San Sebastián on 12 May.

== Prologue ==
23 April 1974 - Almería to Almería, 5 km (3.1 mi) (ITT)

Prologue result and general classification after Prologue

Rank	Rider	Team	Time
1	Roger Swerts (BEL)	IJsboerke–Colner	5' 18"
2	Jesús Manzaneque (ESP)	La Casera	+ 3"
3	José Antonio González (ESP)	Kas–Kaskol	+ 6"
4	Francisco Elorriaga (ESP)	Kas–Kaskol	+ 8"
5	Gerben Karstens (NED)	Bic	+ 9"
6	Luis Ocaña (ESP)	Bic	s.t.
7	Pedro Torres (ESP)	La Casera	+ 10"
8	Joaquim Agostinho (POR)	Bic	s.t.
9	Miguel María Lasa (ESP)	Kas–Kaskol	+ 11"
10	Bernard Thévenet (FRA)	Peugeot–BP–Michelin	s.t.

== Stage 1 ==
24 April 1974 - Almería to Almería, 98 km (60.9 mi)

Stage 1 result

Rank	Rider	Team	Time
1	Eddy Peelman (BEL)	Bic	2h 39' 01"
2	Domingo Perurena (ESP)	Kas–Kaskol	+ 10"
3	Eric Leman (BEL)	MIC–Ludo–de Gribaldy	+ 16"
4	Gerben Karstens (NED)	Bic	+ 20"
5	Yvan Benaets (BEL)	MIC–Ludo–de Gribaldy	s.t.
6	Roger Swerts (BEL)	IJsboerke–Colner	s.t.
7	Andrés Oliva (ESP)	La Casera	s.t.
8	Guy Sibille (FRA)	Peugeot–BP–Michelin	s.t.
9	Freddy Libouton (BEL)	MIC–Ludo–de Gribaldy	s.t.
10	Francisco Elorriaga (ESP)	Kas–Kaskol	s.t.

General classification after Stage 1

Rank	Rider	Team	Time
1	Roger Swerts (BEL)	IJsboerke–Colner	2h 44' 39"
2	Francisco Elorriaga (ESP)	Kas–Kaskol	+ 3"
3	Jesús Manzaneque (ESP)	La Casera	s.t.
4	Eddy Peelman (BEL)	Bic	s.t.
5	José Antonio González (ESP)	Kas–Kaskol	+ 6"
6	Domingo Perurena (ESP)	Kas–Kaskol	+ 8"
7	Gerben Karstens (NED)	Bic	+ 9"
8	Luis Ocaña (ESP)	Bic	s.t.
9	Pedro Torres (ESP)	La Casera	+ 10"
10	Joaquim Agostinho (POR)	Bic	s.t.

== Stage 2 ==
25 April 1974 - Almería to Granada, 187 km (116.2 mi)

Stage 2 result

Rank	Rider	Team	Time
1	Eric Leman (BEL)	MIC–Ludo–de Gribaldy	6h 12' 44"
2	Bernard Thévenet (FRA)	Peugeot–BP–Michelin	+ 10"
3	Domingo Perurena (ESP)	Kas–Kaskol	+ 21"
4	Raymond Delisle (FRA)	Peugeot–BP–Michelin	+ 27"
5	José Luis Abilleira (ESP)	La Casera	+ 30"
6	Luis Ocaña (ESP)	Bic	s.t.
7	Pedro Torres (ESP)	La Casera	+ 33"
8	Jean-Pierre Danguillaume (FRA)	Peugeot–BP–Michelin	+ 36"
9	Miguel María Lasa (ESP)	Kas–Kaskol	s.t.
10	Joaquim Agostinho (POR)	Bic	+ 40"

General classification after Stage 2

Rank	Rider	Team	Time
1	Bernard Thévenet (FRA)	Peugeot–BP–Michelin	8h 57' 44"
2	Domingo Perurena (ESP)	Kas–Kaskol	+ 3"
3	Eric Leman (BEL)	MIC–Ludo–de Gribaldy	+ 7"
4	Luis Ocaña (ESP)	Bic	+ 18"
5	Jesús Manzaneque (ESP)	La Casera	+ 22"
6	Pedro Torres (ESP)	La Casera	s.t.
7	Roger Swerts (BEL)	IJsboerke–Colner	+ 26"
8	Miguel María Lasa (ESP)	Kas–Kaskol	s.t.
9	José Luis Abilleira (ESP)	La Casera	s.t.
10	Joaquim Agostinho (POR)	Bic	+ 29"

== Stage 3 ==
26 April 1974 - Granada to Fuengirola, 161 km (100 mi)

Stage 3 result

Rank	Rider	Team	Time
1	Rik Van Linden (BEL)	IJsboerke–Colner	4h 22' 05"
2	Yvan Benaets (BEL)	MIC–Ludo–de Gribaldy	+ 10"
3	Eric Leman (BEL)	MIC–Ludo–de Gribaldy	+ 16"
4	Gerben Karstens (NED)	Bic	+ 20"
5	Andrés Oliva (ESP)	La Casera	s.t.
6	José Luis Abilleira (ESP)	La Casera	s.t.
7	Roger Swerts (BEL)	IJsboerke–Colner	s.t.
8	Jacques-André Hochart (FRA)	Magiglace–Juaneda	s.t.
9	Guy Sibille (FRA)	Peugeot–BP–Michelin	s.t.
10	José Viejo (ESP)	La Casera	s.t.

General classification after Stage 3

Rank	Rider	Team	Time
1	Bernard Thévenet (FRA)	Peugeot–BP–Michelin	12h 20' 09"
2	Domingo Perurena (ESP)	Kas–Kaskol	+ 3"
3	Eric Leman (BEL)	MIC–Ludo–de Gribaldy	s.t.
4	Luis Ocaña (ESP)	Bic	+ 18"
5	Miguel María Lasa (ESP)	Kas–Kaskol	+ 21"
6	Pedro Torres (ESP)	La Casera	+ 22"
7	Jesús Manzaneque (ESP)	La Casera	s.t.
8	Roger Swerts (BEL)	IJsboerke–Colner	+ 26"
9	José Luis Abilleira (ESP)	La Casera	s.t.
10	Joaquim Agostinho (POR)	Bic	+ 29"

== Stage 4 ==
27 April 1974 - Marbella to Seville, 206 km (128 mi)

Stage 4 result

Rank	Rider	Team	Time
1	Rik Van Linden (BEL)	IJsboerke–Colner	6h 25' 38"
2	Francisco Elorriaga (ESP)	Kas–Kaskol	+ 10"
3	Gerben Karstens (NED)	Bic	+ 14"
4	Eric Leman (BEL)	MIC–Ludo–de Gribaldy	s.t.
5	Eddy Peelman (BEL)	Bic	s.t.
6	Roger Swerts (BEL)	IJsboerke–Colner	s.t.
7	Domingo Perurena (ESP)	Kas–Kaskol	s.t.
8	Freddy Libouton (BEL)	MIC–Ludo–de Gribaldy	s.t.
9	Jesús Manzaneque (ESP)	La Casera	s.t.
10	Pedro Torres (ESP)	La Casera	s.t.

General classification after Stage 4

Rank	Rider	Team	Time
1	Domingo Perurena (ESP)	Kas–Kaskol	19h 46' 00"
2	Bernard Thévenet (FRA)	Peugeot–BP–Michelin	+ 7"
3	Eric Leman (BEL)	MIC–Ludo–de Gribaldy	+ 10"
4	Rik Van Linden (BEL)	IJsboerke–Colner	+ 21"
5	Luis Ocaña (ESP)	Bic	+ 25"
6	Miguel María Lasa (ESP)	Kas–Kaskol	+ 28"
7	Pedro Torres (ESP)	La Casera	+ 29"
8	Jesús Manzaneque (ESP)	La Casera	s.t.
9	Roger Swerts (BEL)	IJsboerke–Colner	+ 33"
10	José Luis Abilleira (ESP)	La Casera	s.t.

== Stage 5 ==
28 April 1974 - Seville to Córdoba, 139 km (86 mi)

Stage 5 result

Rank	Rider	Team	Time
1	Domingo Perurena (ESP)	Kas–Kaskol	4h 21' 26"
2	Agustín Tamames (ESP)	Coelima–Benfica	+ 10"
3	Eric Leman (BEL)	MIC–Ludo–de Gribaldy	+ 16"
4	Miguel María Lasa (ESP)	Kas–Kaskol	+ 20"
5	Andrés Oliva (ESP)	La Casera	s.t.
6	Juan Santiago Zurano Jerez (ESP)	La Casera	s.t.
7	Pedro Torres (ESP)	La Casera	s.t.
8	José Luis Abilleira (ESP)	La Casera	s.t.
9	Jesús Manzaneque (ESP)	La Casera	s.t.
10	Jean-Pierre Danguillaume (FRA)	Peugeot–BP–Michelin	s.t.

General classification after Stage 5

Rank	Rider	Team	Time
1	Domingo Perurena (ESP)	Kas–Kaskol	24h 07' 26"
2	Eric Leman (BEL)	MIC–Ludo–de Gribaldy	+ 26"
3	Bernard Thévenet (FRA)	Peugeot–BP–Michelin	+ 27"
4	Luis Ocaña (ESP)	Bic	+ 45"
5	Miguel María Lasa (ESP)	Kas–Kaskol	+ 48"
6	Pedro Torres (ESP)	La Casera	+ 49"
7	Jesús Manzaneque (ESP)	La Casera	s.t.
8	José Luis Abilleira (ESP)	La Casera	+ 53"
9	Joaquim Agostinho (POR)	Bic	+ 56"
10	Raymond Delisle (FRA)	Peugeot–BP–Michelin	+ 1' 00"

== Stage 6 ==
29 April 1974 - Córdoba to Ciudad Real, 211 km (131 mi)

Stage 6 result

Rank	Rider	Team	Time
1	Eddy Peelman (BEL)	Bic	6h 30' 15"
2	Andrés Oliva (ESP)	La Casera	+ 10"
3	Jesús Manzaneque (ESP)	La Casera	+ 16"
4	Roger Swerts (BEL)	IJsboerke–Colner	+ 20"
5	Juan Santiago Zurano Jerez (ESP)	La Casera	s.t.
6	Eric Leman (BEL)	MIC–Ludo–de Gribaldy	s.t.
7	Domingo Perurena (ESP)	Kas–Kaskol	s.t.
8	Ventura Díaz (ESP)	Monteverde	s.t.
9	Miguel María Lasa (ESP)	Kas–Kaskol	s.t.
10	José Luis Abilleira (ESP)	La Casera	s.t.

== Stage 7 ==
30 April 1974 - Ciudad Real to Toledo, 126 km (78 mi)

Stage 7 result

Rank	Rider	Team	Time
1	Domingo Perurena (ESP)	Kas–Kaskol	3h 23' 19"
2	Eric Leman (BEL)	MIC–Ludo–de Gribaldy	+ 10"
3	Miguel María Lasa (ESP)	Kas–Kaskol	+ 14"
4	José Luis Abilleira (ESP)	La Casera	+ 20"
5	Francisco Elorriaga (ESP)	Kas–Kaskol	+ 24"
6	José Viejo (ESP)	La Casera	s.t.
7	Pedro Torres (ESP)	La Casera	s.t.
8	José Madeira (POR)	Coelima–Benfica	s.t.
9	Roger Swerts (BEL)	IJsboerke–Colner	s.t.
10	Juan Santiago Zurano Jerez (ESP)	La Casera	s.t.

General classification after Stage 7

Rank	Rider	Team	Time
1	Domingo Perurena (ESP)	Kas–Kaskol	34h 01' 00"
2	Eric Leman (BEL)	MIC–Ludo–de Gribaldy	+ 36"
3	Miguel María Lasa (ESP)	Kas–Kaskol	+ 1' 00"
4	Jesús Manzaneque (ESP)	La Casera	s.t.
5	José Luis Abilleira (ESP)	La Casera	+ 1' 13"
6	Pedro Torres (ESP)	La Casera	s.t.
7	Luis Ocaña (ESP)	Bic	+ 1' 16"
8	Andrés Oliva (ESP)	La Casera	+ 1' 23"
9	Raymond Delisle (FRA)	Peugeot–BP–Michelin	+ 1' 24"
10	Joaquim Agostinho (POR)	Bic	+ 1' 27"

== Stage 8a ==
1 May 1974 - Toledo to Madrid, 167 km (104 mi)

Stage 8a result

Rank	Rider	Team	Time
1	Roger Swerts (BEL)	IJsboerke–Colner	4h 43' 21"
2	Guy Sibille (FRA)	Peugeot–BP–Michelin	+ 10"
3	Rik Van Linden (BEL)	IJsboerke–Colner	+ 17"
4	Eric Leman (BEL)	MIC–Ludo–de Gribaldy	+ 22"
5	Francisco Elorriaga (ESP)	Kas–Kaskol	s.t.
6	Martin Martinez (FRA)	Magiglace–Juaneda	s.t.
7	Gerben Karstens (NED)	Bic	s.t.
8	Raymond Steegmans (BEL)	IJsboerke–Colner	s.t.
9	André Mollet (FRA)	Peugeot–BP–Michelin	s.t.
10	Régis Ovion (FRA)	Peugeot–BP–Michelin	s.t.

== Stage 8b ==
1 May 1974 - Circuito del Jarama, 4 km (2.5 mi) (TTT)

Stage 8b result

Rank	Team	Time
1	Kas–Kaskol	17' 08"
2	IJsboerke–Colner	+ 16"
3	Bic	+ 56"
4	Peugeot–BP–Michelin	+ 1' 16"
5	La Casera	+ 1' 18"
6	Magiglace–Juaneda	+ 1' 20"
7	Coelima–Benfica	+ 1' 24"
8	MIC–Ludo–de Gribaldy	s.t.
9	Monteverde	+ 1' 32"

General classification after Stage 8b

Rank	Rider	Team	Time
1	Domingo Perurena (ESP)	Kas–Kaskol	38h 44' 33"
2	Eric Leman (BEL)	MIC–Ludo–de Gribaldy	+ 46"
3	Miguel María Lasa (ESP)	Kas–Kaskol	+ 1' 04"
4	Jesús Manzaneque (ESP)	La Casera	+ 1' 13"
5	José Luis Abilleira (ESP)	La Casera	+ 1' 23"
6	Pedro Torres (ESP)	La Casera	s.t.
7	Luis Ocaña (ESP)	Bic	+ 1' 16"
8	José Antonio González (ESP)	Kas–Kaskol	+ 1' 27"
9	José Manuel Fuente (ESP)	Kas–Kaskol	s.t.
10	Andrés Oliva (ESP)	La Casera	+ 1' 33"

== Stage 9 ==
2 May 1974 - Madrid to Los Ángeles de San Rafael, 158 km (98 mi)

Stage 9 result

Rank	Rider	Team	Time
1	José Manuel Fuente (ESP)	Kas–Kaskol	4h 42' 39"
2	Miguel María Lasa (ESP)	Kas–Kaskol	+ 41"
3	Bernard Thévenet (FRA)	Peugeot–BP–Michelin	+ 47"
4	Raymond Delisle (FRA)	Peugeot–BP–Michelin	+ 55"
5	Joaquim Agostinho (POR)	Bic	s.t.
6	Luis Ocaña (ESP)	Bic	+ 56"
7	Agustín Tamames (ESP)	Coelima–Benfica	+ 1' 20"
8	Domingo Perurena (ESP)	Kas–Kaskol	+ 1' 31"
9	Willy In 't Ven (BEL)	IJsboerke–Colner	s.t.
10	José Luis Uribezubia (ESP)	Kas–Kaskol	+ 1' 44"

General classification after Stage 9

Rank	Rider	Team	Time
1	Domingo Perurena (ESP)	Kas–Kaskol	43h 28' 34"
2	José Manuel Fuente (ESP)	Kas–Kaskol	+ 5"
3	Miguel María Lasa (ESP)	Kas–Kaskol	+ 23"
4	Luis Ocaña (ESP)	Bic	+ 1' 00"
5	Raymond Delisle (FRA)	Peugeot–BP–Michelin	+ 1' 07"
6	Joaquim Agostinho (POR)	Bic	+ 1' 10"
7	Jesús Manzaneque (ESP)	La Casera	+ 1' 47"
8	José Luis Abilleira (ESP)	La Casera	+ 2' 01"
9	José Antonio González (ESP)	Kas–Kaskol	+ 2' 09"
10	Bernard Thévenet (FRA)	Peugeot–BP–Michelin	+ 2' 12"

== Stage 10a ==
3 May 1974 - Los Ángeles de San Rafael to Los Ángeles de San Rafael, 5 km (3.1 mi) (ITT)

Stage 10a result

Rank	Rider	Team	Time
1	Raymond Delisle (FRA)	Peugeot–BP–Michelin	10' 04"
2	José Manuel Fuente (ESP)	Kas–Kaskol	+ 29"
3	Bernard Thévenet (FRA)	Peugeot–BP–Michelin	+ 31"
4	Luis Ocaña (ESP)	Bic	+ 33"
5	Joaquim Agostinho (POR)	Bic	+ 34"
6	Agustín Tamames (ESP)	Coelima–Benfica	+ 36"
7	José Casas García (ESP)	Monteverde	+ 47"
8	Miguel María Lasa (ESP)	Kas–Kaskol	+ 48"
9	Antonio Vallori (ESP)	La Casera	+ 54"
10	Antonio Martins Lopes (POR)	Coelima–Benfica	+ 55"

== Stage 10b ==
3 May 1974 - Los Ángeles de San Rafael to Ávila, 125 km (78 mi)

Stage 10b result

Rank	Rider	Team	Time
1	Martin Martinez (FRA)	Magiglace–Juaneda	4h 03' 35"
2	Agustín Tamames (ESP)	Coelima–Benfica	+ 1' 26"
3	Miguel María Lasa (ESP)	Kas–Kaskol	+ 1' 33"
4	Antonio Menéndez (ESP)	Kas–Kaskol	+ 1' 39"
5	Rik Van Linden (BEL)	IJsboerke–Colner	+ 1' 46"
6	Francisco Elorriaga (ESP)	Kas–Kaskol	+ 1' 48"
7	Eric Leman (BEL)	MIC–Ludo–de Gribaldy	s.t.
8	Antonio Vallori (ESP)	La Casera	+ 1' 53"
9	Domingo Perurena (ESP)	Kas–Kaskol	s.t.
10	Juan Santiago Zurano Jerez (ESP)	La Casera	s.t.

General classification after Stage 10b

Rank	Rider	Team	Time
1	José Manuel Fuente (ESP)	Kas–Kaskol	47h 44' 55"
2	Miguel María Lasa (ESP)	Kas–Kaskol	+ 24"
3	Raymond Delisle (FRA)	Peugeot–BP–Michelin	+ 28"
4	Domingo Perurena (ESP)	Kas–Kaskol	+ 39"
5	Luis Ocaña (ESP)	Bic	+ 1' 04"
6	Joaquim Agostinho (POR)	Bic	+ 1' 15"
7	Bernard Thévenet (FRA)	Peugeot–BP–Michelin	+ 2' 12"
8	José Luis Abilleira (ESP)	La Casera	+ 2' 34"
9	José Antonio González (ESP)	Kas–Kaskol	+ 2' 58"
10	José Luis Uribezubia (ESP)	Kas–Kaskol	+ 3' 14"
