= 1974 Giro d'Italia, Stage 1 to Stage 11b =

Cycling race

The 1974 Giro d'Italia was the 57th edition of the Giro d'Italia, one of cycling's Grand Tours. The Giro began in the Vatican City on 16 May, and Stage 11b occurred on 27 May with a stage to Forte dei Marmi. The race finished in Milan on 8 June.

== Stage 1 ==
16 May 1974 — Vatican City to Formia, 164 km (102 mi)

Stage 1 result and general classification after Stage 1

Rank	Rider	Team	Time
1	Wilfried Reybrouck (BEL)	Filcas	4h 16' 12"
2	Roger De Vlaeminck (BEL)	Brooklyn	s.t.
3	Marino Basso (ITA)	Bianchi–Campagnolo	s.t.
4	Enrico Paolini (ITA)	Scic	s.t.
5	Patrick Sercu (BEL)	Brooklyn	s.t.
6	Alfred Gaida (FRG)	Rokado	s.t.
7	Alessio Antonini (ITA)	Jollj Ceramica	s.t.
8	Hennie Kuiper (NED)	Rokado	s.t.
9	Franco Bitossi (ITA)	Scic	s.t.
10	Pierino Gavazzi (ITA)	Jollj Ceramica	s.t.

== Stage 2 ==
17 May 1974 — Formia to Pompei, 121 km (75 mi)

Stage 2 result

Rank	Rider	Team	Time
1	Patrick Sercu (BEL)	Brooklyn	2h 49' 11"
2	Giacinto Santambrogio (ITA)	Bianchi–Campagnolo	s.t.
3	Roger De Vlaeminck (BEL)	Brooklyn	s.t.
4	Sigfrido Fontanelli (ITA)	Sammontana	s.t.
5	Marino Basso (ITA)	Bianchi–Campagnolo	s.t.
6	Franco Bitossi (ITA)	Scic	s.t.
7	Gianni Motta (ITA)	Magniflex	s.t.
8	Alessio Antonini (ITA)	Jollj Ceramica	s.t.
9	Jos Huysmans (BEL)	Molteni	s.t.
10	Pierino Gavazzi (ITA)	Jollj Ceramica	s.t.

General classification after Stage 2

Rank	Rider	Team	Time
1	Wilfried Reybrouck (BEL)	Filcas	7h 05' 23"
2	Roger De Vlaeminck (BEL)	Brooklyn	s.t.
3	Marino Basso (ITA)	Bianchi–Campagnolo	s.t.
4	Enrico Paolini (ITA)	Scic	s.t.
5	Patrick Sercu (BEL)	Brooklyn	s.t.
6	Alfred Gaida (FRG)	Rokado	s.t.
7	Alessio Antonini (ITA)	Jollj Ceramica	s.t.
8	Hennie Kuiper (NED)	Rokado	s.t.
9	Franco Bitossi (ITA)	Scic	s.t.
10	Pierino Gavazzi (ITA)	Jollj Ceramica	s.t.

== Stage 3 ==
18 May 1974 — Pompei to Sorrento, 137 km (85 mi)

Stage 3 result

Rank	Rider	Team	Time
1	José Manuel Fuente (ESP)	Kas–Kaskol	3h 56' 24"
2	Francesco Moser (ITA)	Filotex	+ 33"
3	Giovanni Battaglin (ITA)	Jollj Ceramica	s.t.
4	Italo Zilioli (ITA)	Dreherforte	s.t.
5	Felice Gimondi (ITA)	Bianchi–Campagnolo	s.t.
6	Constantino Conti (ITA)	Zonca	s.t.
7	José Luis Uribezubia (ESP)	Kas–Kaskol	s.t.
8	Santiago Lazcano (ESP)	Kas–Kaskol	s.t.
9	Ole Ritter (DEN)	Filotex	+ 42"
10	Vicente López Carril (ESP)	Kas–Kaskol	s.t.

General classification after Stage 3

Rank	Rider	Team	Time
1	José Manuel Fuente (ESP)	Kas–Kaskol	11h 01' 47"
2	Francesco Moser (ITA)	Filotex	+ 33"
3	Santiago Lazcano (ESP)	Kas–Kaskol	s.t.
4	Felice Gimondi (ITA)	Bianchi–Campagnolo	s.t.
5	Italo Zilioli (ITA)	Dreherforte	s.t.
6	José Luis Uribezubia (ESP)	Kas–Kaskol	s.t.
7	Giovanni Battaglin (ITA)	Jollj Ceramica	s.t.
8	Constantino Conti (ITA)	Zonca	s.t.
9	Franco Bitossi (ITA)	Scic	+ 42"
10	Hennie Kuiper (NED)	Rokado	s.t.

== Rest day ==
19 May 1970

== Stage 4 ==
20 May 1974 — Sorrento to Sapri, 208 km (129 mi)

Stage 4 result

Rank	Rider	Team	Time
1	Roger De Vlaeminck (BEL)	Brooklyn	5h 58' 36"
2	Bruno Vicino (ITA)	Jollj Ceramica	s.t.
3	Pierino Gavazzi (ITA)	Jollj Ceramica	s.t.
4	Johan Ruch (FRG)	Rokado	s.t.
5	Patrick Sercu (BEL)	Brooklyn	s.t.
6	Alessio Antonini (ITA)	Jollj Ceramica	s.t.
7	Karel Rottiers (BEL)	Molteni	s.t.
8	Marino Basso (ITA)	Bianchi–Campagnolo	s.t.
9	Franco Bitossi (ITA)	Scic	s.t.
10	Gianfranco Foresti (ITA)	Bianchi–Campagnolo	s.t.

General classification after Stage 4

Rank	Rider	Team	Time
1	José Manuel Fuente (ESP)	Kas–Kaskol	23h 05' 20"
2	Francesco Moser (ITA)	Filotex	+ 33"
3	Santiago Lazcano (ESP)	Kas–Kaskol	s.t.
4	Felice Gimondi (ITA)	Bianchi–Campagnolo	s.t.
5	Italo Zilioli (ITA)	Dreherforte	s.t.
6	José Luis Uribezubia (ESP)	Kas–Kaskol	s.t.
7	Giovanni Battaglin (ITA)	Jollj Ceramica	s.t.
8	Constantino Conti (ITA)	Zonca	s.t.

== Stage 5 ==
21 May 1974 — Sapri to Taranto, 215 km (134 mi)

Stage 5 result

Rank	Rider	Team	Time
1	Pierino Gavazzi (ITA)	Jollj Ceramica	6h 04' 57"
2	Ercole Gualazzini (ITA)	Brooklyn	s.t.
3	Roger De Vlaeminck (BEL)	Brooklyn	s.t.
4	Bruno Vicino (ITA)	Jollj Ceramica	s.t.
5	Walter Riccomi (ITA)	Sammontana	s.t.
6	Franco Bitossi (ITA)	Scic	s.t.
7	Francesco Moser (ITA)	Filotex	s.t.
8	Marino Basso (ITA)	Bianchi–Campagnolo	s.t.
9	Alessio Antonini (ITA)	Jollj Ceramica	s.t.
10	Gianfranco Foresti (ITA)	Bianchi–Campagnolo	s.t.

General classification after Stage 5

Rank	Rider	Team	Time
1	José Manuel Fuente (ESP)	Kas–Kaskol	23h 05' 20"
2	Francesco Moser (ITA)	Filotex	+ 33"
3	Felice Gimondi (ITA)	Bianchi–Campagnolo	s.t.
4	Italo Zilioli (ITA)	Dreherforte	s.t.
5	José Luis Uribezubia (ESP)	Kas–Kaskol	s.t.
6	Giovanni Battaglin (ITA)	Jollj Ceramica	s.t.
7	Constantino Conti (ITA)	Zonca	s.t.
8	Roger De Vlaeminck (BEL)	Brooklyn	+ 42"
9	Franco Bitossi (ITA)	Scic	s.t.
10	Walter Riccomi (ITA)	Sammontana	s.t.

== Stage 6 ==
22 May 1974 — Taranto to Foggia, 206 km (128 mi)

Stage 6 result

Rank	Rider	Team	Time
1	Franco Bitossi (ITA)	Scic	5h 57' 00"
2	Karel Rottiers (BEL)	Molteni	+ 2"
3	Walter Avogadri (ITA)	Zonca	s.t.
4	Roger De Vlaeminck (BEL)	Brooklyn	s.t.
5	Pierino Gavazzi (ITA)	Jollj Ceramica	s.t.
6	Patrick Sercu (BEL)	Brooklyn	s.t.
7	Ercole Gualazzini (ITA)	Brooklyn	s.t.
8	Walter Riccomi (ITA)	Sammontana	s.t.
9	Roland Salm (SUI)	Zonca	s.t.
10	Hennie Kuiper (NED)	Rokado	s.t.

General classification after Stage 6

Rank	Rider	Team	Time
1	José Manuel Fuente (ESP)	Kas–Kaskol	29h 02' 22"
2	Francesco Moser (ITA)	Filotex	+ 33"
3	Felice Gimondi (ITA)	Bianchi–Campagnolo	s.t.
4	Italo Zilioli (ITA)	Dreherforte	s.t.
5	José Luis Uribezubia (ESP)	Kas–Kaskol	s.t.
6	Giovanni Battaglin (ITA)	Jollj Ceramica	s.t.
7	Constantino Conti (ITA)	Zonca	s.t.
8	Franco Bitossi (ITA)	Scic	+ 40"
9	Roger De Vlaeminck (BEL)	Brooklyn	+ 42"
10	Walter Riccomi (ITA)	Sammontana	s.t.

== Stage 7 ==
23 May 1974 — Foggia to Chieti, 257 km (160 mi)

Stage 7 result

Rank	Rider	Team	Time
1	Ugo Colombo (ITA)	Filotex	7h 26' 28"
2	Roger De Vlaeminck (BEL)	Brooklyn	+ 44"
3	Marcello Bergamo (ITA)	Filotex	s.t.
4	Eddy Merckx (BEL)	Molteni	s.t.
5	Gianbattista Baronchelli (ITA)	Scic	+ 46"
6	Franco Bitossi (ITA)	Scic	s.t.
7	Felice Gimondi (ITA)	Bianchi–Campagnolo	s.t.
8	Ole Ritter (DEN)	Filotex	+ 47"
9	Giovanni Battaglin (ITA)	Jollj Ceramica	+ 48"
10	Italo Zilioli (ITA)	Dreherforte	s.t.

General classification after Stage 7

Rank	Rider	Team	Time
1	José Manuel Fuente (ESP)	Kas–Kaskol	36h 29' 41"
2	Felice Gimondi (ITA)	Bianchi–Campagnolo	+ 28"
3	Italo Zilioli (ITA)	Dreherforte	+ 30"
4	Giovanni Battaglin (ITA)	Jollj Ceramica	s.t.
5	Francesco Moser (ITA)	Filotex	+ 32"
6	José Luis Uribezubia (ESP)	Kas–Kaskol	+ 34"
7	Roger De Vlaeminck (BEL)	Brooklyn	+ 35"
8	Franco Bitossi (ITA)	Scic	s.t.
9	Eddy Merckx (BEL)	Molteni	s.t.
10	Constantino Conti (ITA)	Zonca	s.t.

== Stage 8 ==
24 May 1974 — Chieti to Macerata, 150 km (93 mi)

Stage 8 result

Rank	Rider	Team	Time
1	Franco Bitossi (ITA)	Scic	4h 19' 08"
2	Martín Emilio Rodríguez (COL)	Bianchi–Campagnolo	s.t.
3	Claudio Bortolotto (ITA)	Filcas	s.t.
4	Francesco Moser (ITA)	Filotex	s.t.
5	Victor Van Schil (BEL)	Molteni	s.t.
6	Sigfrido Fontanelli (ITA)	Sammontana	s.t.
7	Pierino Gavazzi (ITA)	Jollj Ceramica	s.t.
8	Guerrino Tosello (ITA)	Furzi	s.t.
9	Louis Pfenninger (SUI)	Zonca	s.t.
10	Wilmo Francioni (ITA)	Sammontana	s.t.

General classification after Stage 8

Rank	Rider	Team	Time
1	José Manuel Fuente (ESP)	Kas–Kaskol	40h 48' 49"
2	Felice Gimondi (ITA)	Bianchi–Campagnolo	+ 28"
3	Italo Zilioli (ITA)	Dreherforte	+ 30"
4	Giovanni Battaglin (ITA)	Jollj Ceramica	s.t.
5	Francesco Moser (ITA)	Filotex	+ 32"
6	José Luis Uribezubia (ESP)	Kas–Kaskol	+ 34"
7	Roger De Vlaeminck (BEL)	Brooklyn	+ 35"
8	Franco Bitossi (ITA)	Scic	s.t.
9	Eddy Merckx (BEL)	Molteni	s.t.
10	Constantino Conti (ITA)	Zonca	s.t.

== Stage 9 ==
25 May 1974 — Macerata to Carpegna, 191 km (119 mi)

Stage 9 result

Rank	Rider	Team	Time
1	José Manuel Fuente (ESP)	Kas–Kaskol	6h 06' 11"
2	Eddy Merckx (BEL)	Molteni	+ 1' 05"
3	Enrico Paolini (ITA)	Scic	+ 1' 44"
4	Roger De Vlaeminck (BEL)	Brooklyn	s.t.
5	Emanuele Bergamo (ITA)	Filotex	s.t.
6	Felice Gimondi (ITA)	Bianchi–Campagnolo	s.t.
7	Roberto Poggiali (ITA)	Filotex	s.t.
8	Franco Bitossi (ITA)	Scic	s.t.
9	Hennie Kuiper (NED)	Rokado	s.t.
10	Wladimiro Panizza (ITA)	Brooklyn	s.t.

General classification after Stage 9

Rank	Rider	Team	Time
1	José Manuel Fuente (ESP)	Kas–Kaskol	46h 55' 00"
2	Eddy Merckx (BEL)	Molteni	+ 1' 40"
3	Felice Gimondi (ITA)	Bianchi–Campagnolo	+ 2' 12"
4	Giovanni Battaglin (ITA)	Jollj Ceramica	+ 2' 16"
5	José Luis Uribezubia (ESP)	Kas–Kaskol	+ 2' 18"
6	Roger De Vlaeminck (BEL)	Brooklyn	+ 2' 19"
7	Franco Bitossi (ITA)	Scic	s.t.
8	Constantino Conti (ITA)	Zonca	s.t.
9	Gianbattista Baronchelli (ITA)	Scic	+ 2' 21"
10	Ole Ritter (DEN)	Filotex	+ 2' 22"

== Stage 10 ==
26 May 1974 — Carpegna to Modena, 205 km (127 mi)

Stage 10 result

Rank	Rider	Team	Time
1	Patrick Sercu (BEL)	Brooklyn	4h 49' 20"
2	Marino Basso (ITA)	Bianchi–Campagnolo	s.t.
3	Roger De Vlaeminck (BEL)	Brooklyn	s.t.
4	Pierino Gavazzi (ITA)	Jollj Ceramica	s.t.
5	Bruno Vicino (ITA)	Jollj Ceramica	s.t.
6	Marcello Osler (ITA)	Sammontana	s.t.
7	Julien Van Lint (BEL)	Brooklyn	s.t.
8	Claudio Bortolotto (ITA)	Filcas	s.t.
9	Alessio Antonini (ITA)	Jollj Ceramica	s.t.
10	Walter Avogadri (ITA)	Zonca	s.t.

General classification after Stage 10

Rank	Rider	Team	Time
1	José Manuel Fuente (ESP)	Kas–Kaskol	51h 44' 20"
2	Eddy Merckx (BEL)	Molteni	+ 1' 40"
3	Felice Gimondi (ITA)	Bianchi–Campagnolo	+ 2' 12"
4	Giovanni Battaglin (ITA)	Jollj Ceramica	+ 2' 14"
5	José Luis Uribezubia (ESP)	Kas–Kaskol	+ 2' 18"
6	Roger De Vlaeminck (BEL)	Brooklyn	+ 2' 19"
7	Franco Bitossi (ITA)	Scic	s.t.
8	Constantino Conti (ITA)	Zonca	s.t.
9	Gianbattista Baronchelli (ITA)	Scic	+ 2' 21"
10	Ole Ritter (DEN)	Filotex	+ 2' 22"

== Stage 11a ==
27 May 1974 — Modena to Il Ciocco, 153 km (95 mi)

Stage 11a result

Rank	Rider	Team	Time
1	José Manuel Fuente (ESP)	Kas–Kaskol	4h 40' 30"
2	Eddy Merckx (BEL)	Molteni	+ 41"
3	Constantino Conti (ITA)	Zonca	s.t.
4	Gianbattista Baronchelli (ITA)	Scic	+ 47"
5	Franco Bitossi (ITA)	Scic	+ 49"
6	Wladimiro Panizza (ITA)	Brooklyn	s.t.
7	Gösta Pettersson (SWE)	Magniflex	+ 58"
8	Giovanni Battaglin (ITA)	Jollj Ceramica	s.t.
9	Roger De Vlaeminck (BEL)	Brooklyn	+ 1' 09"
10	Felice Gimondi (ITA)	Bianchi–Campagnolo	s.t.

General classification after Stage 11a

Rank	Rider	Team	Time
1	José Manuel Fuente (ESP)	Kas–Kaskol	

== Stage 11b ==
27 May 1974 — Il Ciocco to Forte dei Marmi, 62 km (39 mi)

Stage 11b result

Rank	Rider	Team	Time
1	Patrick Sercu (BEL)	Brooklyn	1h 43' 23"
2	Roger De Vlaeminck (BEL)	Brooklyn	s.t.
3	Marcello Osler (ITA)	Sammontana	s.t.
4	Luciano Borgognoni (ITA)	Dreherforte	s.t.
5	Marino Basso (ITA)	Bianchi–Campagnolo	s.t.
6	Franco Bitossi (ITA)	Scic	s.t.
7	Alessio Antonini (ITA)	Jollj Ceramica	s.t.
8	Frans Mintjens (BEL)	Molteni	s.t.
9	Giacomo Bazzan (ITA)	Jollj Ceramica	s.t.
10	Francesco Moser (ITA)	Filotex	s.t.

General classification after Stage 11b

Rank	Rider	Team	Time
1	José Manuel Fuente (ESP)	Kas–Kaskol	58h 08' 13"
2	Eddy Merckx (BEL)	Molteni	+ 2' 21"
3	Constantino Conti (ITA)	Zonca	+ 3' 00"
4	Franco Bitossi (ITA)	Scic	+ 3' 08"
5	Gianbattista Baronchelli (ITA)	Scic	s.t.
6	Giovanni Battaglin (ITA)	Jollj Ceramica	+ 3' 12"
7	Felice Gimondi (ITA)	Bianchi–Campagnolo	+ 3' 21"
8	Roger De Vlaeminck (BEL)	Brooklyn	+ 3' 28"
9	Italo Zilioli (ITA)	Dreherforte	+ 3' 58"
10	José Luis Uribezubia (ESP)	Kas–Kaskol	+ 4' 03"
