= King of the Mountains =

Cycling race award for best climber

King of the Mountains / Queen of the Mountains
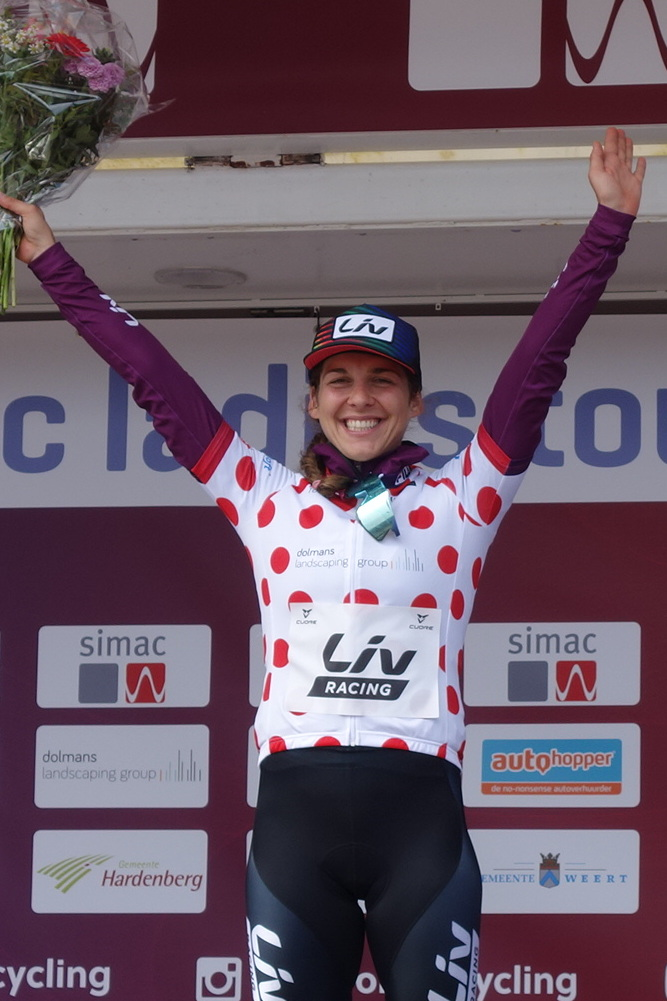
- A polkadot cycling jersey worn by Queen of the Mountains: Alison Jackson
- Sport: Road bicycle racing
- Competition: Tour de France; Giro d'Italia; Vuelta a España; Most Stage races
- Awarded for: Climbing specialists
- Local name: Le Roi des montagnes (French); Gran Premio della Montagna (Italian); Gran Premio de la montaña (Spanish)

The King of the Mountains (KoM) is an award given to the best climbing specialist in a men's cycling road race; in women's cycle racing, Queen of the Mountains (QoM) is used.

While the title may be given to the rider who achieves the highest position over several designated climbs in a single-day road race, it is more usually applied to stage races (for example, the Grand Tours, Tour de France, Giro d'Italia, Vuelta a España) where points are accumulated over the duration of the whole race.

In the Tour de France, where it is officially known as the Mountains classification, at the top of each significant climb, points are awarded to the riders who are first over the top. The climbs are categorised from 1 (most difficult) to 4 (least difficult) based on their steepness and length. A fifth category, called Hors catégorie (outside category) applies to mountains rated even more severe than first category. Similar ratings apply to climbs in the other major Tours.

In the Tour de France, the leader in the mountains competition wears a distinctive polka dot jersey (French: maillot à pois rouges). Although the King of the Mountains was first recognised in the 1933 Tour de France, the distinctive jersey was not introduced until 1975. In the Giro, the King of the Mountains leader wore a green jersey until 2011; in 2012, the jersey changed to blue at the behest of the corporate sponsor of the mountains classification. In the Vuelta several jersey designs have been used, but since 2010 it has been white with blue polka dots.

Additionally, King or Queen of the Mountains can also apply to the highest ranked user in certain activities tracked by services such as Strava.

== Mountains classification winners of the Grand Tours ==
=== Winners by year ===
Legend
Rider also won General classification
Rider also won General and Points classification
Rider also won General and Young Rider classification
Rider also won Young Rider classification

Year	Giro d'Italia	Tour de France	Vuelta a España
1933	Alfredo Binda (ITA) (1/1)	Vicente Trueba (ESP) (1/1)	Race not held
1934	Remo Bertoni (ITA) (1/1)	René Vietto (FRA) (1/1)	Race not held
1935	Gino Bartali (ITA) (1/9)	Félicien Vervaecke (BEL) (1/2)	Edoardo Molinar (ITA) (1/1)
1936	Gino Bartali (ITA) (2/9)	Julián Berrendero (ESP) (1/3)	Salvador Molina (ESP) (1/1)
1937	Gino Bartali (ITA) (3/9)	Félicien Vervaecke (BEL) (2/2)	Race not held
1938	Giovanni Valetti (ITA) (1/1)	Gino Bartali (ITA) (4/9)	Race not held
1939	Gino Bartali (ITA) (5/9)	Sylvere Maes (BEL) (1/1)	Race not held
1940	Gino Bartali (ITA) (6/9)	Race not held	Race not held
1941	Race not held	Race not held	Fermín Trueba (ESP) (1/1)
1942	Race not held	Race not held	Julián Berrendero (ESP) (2/3)
1943	Race not held	Race not held	Race not held
1944	Race not held	Race not held	Race not held
1945	Race not held	Race not held	Julián Berrendero (ESP) (3/3)
1946	Gino Bartali (ITA) (7/9)	Race not held	Emilio Rodríguez (ESP) (1/3)
1947	Gino Bartali (ITA) (8/9)	Pierre Brambilla (ITA) (1/1)	Emilio Rodríguez (ESP) (2/3)
1948	Fausto Coppi (ITA) (1/5)	Gino Bartali (ITA) (9/9)	Bernardo Ruiz (ESP) (1/1)
1949	Fausto Coppi (ITA) (2/5)	Fausto Coppi (ITA) (3/5)	Race not held
1950	Hugo Koblet (SUI) (1/1)	Louison Bobet (FRA) (1/2)	Emilio Rodríguez (ESP) (3/3)
1951	Louison Bobet (FRA) (2/2)	Raphaël Géminiani (FRA) (1/3)	Race not held
1952	Raphaël Géminiani (FRA) (2/3)	Fausto Coppi (ITA) (4/5)	Race not held
1953	Pasquale Fornara (ITA) (1/1)	Jesús Loroño (ESP) (1/1)	Race not held
1954	Fausto Coppi (ITA) (5/5)	Federico Bahamontes (ESP) (1/9)	Race not held
1955	Gastone Nencini (ITA) (1/2)	Charly Gaul (LUX) (1/4)	Giuseppe Buratti (ITA) (1/1)
1956	Charly Gaul (LUX) (2/4)	Charly Gaul (LUX) (3/4)	Nino Defilippis (ITA) (1/1)
1956	Federico Bahamontes (ESP) (2/9)	Charly Gaul (LUX) (3/4)	Nino Defilippis (ITA) (1/1)
1957	Raphaël Géminiani (FRA) (3/3)	Gastone Nencini (ITA) (2/2)	Federico Bahamontes (ESP) (3/9)
1958	Jean Brankart (BEL) (1/1)	Federico Bahamontes (ESP) (5/9)	Federico Bahamontes (ESP) (4/9)
1959	Charly Gaul (LUX) (4/4)	Federico Bahamontes (ESP) (6/9)	Antonio Suárez (ESP) (1/1)
1960	Rik Van Looy (BEL) (1/1)	Imerio Massignan (ITA) (1/2)	Antonio Karmany (ESP) (1/3)
1961	Vito Taccone (ITA) (1/2)	Imerio Massignan (ITA) (2/2)	Antonio Karmany (ESP) (2/3)
1962	Angelino Soler (ESP) (1/1)	Federico Bahamontes (ESP) (7/9)	Antonio Karmany (ESP) (3/3)
1963	Vito Taccone (ITA) (2/2)	Federico Bahamontes (ESP) (8/9)	Julio Jiménez (ESP) (1/6)
1964	Franco Bitossi (ITA) (1/3)	Federico Bahamontes (ESP) (9/9)	Julio Jiménez (ESP) (2/6)
1965	Franco Bitossi (ITA) (2/3)	Julio Jiménez (ESP) (4/6)	Julio Jiménez (ESP) (3/6)
1966	Franco Bitossi (ITA) (3/3)	Julio Jiménez (ESP) (5/6)	Gregorio San Miguel (ESP) (1/1)
1967	Aurelio Gonzales (ESP) (1/2)	Julio Jiménez (ESP) (6/6)	Mariano Díaz (ESP) (1/1)
1968	Eddy Merckx (BEL) (1/3)	Aurelio Gonzales (ESP) (2/2)	Francisco Gabica (ESP) (1/1)
1969	Claudio Michelotto (ITA) (1/1)	Eddy Merckx (BEL) (2/3)	Luis Ocaña (ESP) (1/1)
1970	Martin Vandenbossche (BEL) (1/1)	Eddy Merckx (BEL) (3/3)	Agustín Tamames (ESP) (1/1)
1971	José Manuel Fuente (ESP) (1/4)	Lucien Van Impe (BEL) (1/8)	Joop Zoetemelk (NED) (1/1)
1972	José Manuel Fuente (ESP) (2/4)	Lucien Van Impe (BEL) (2/8)	José Manuel Fuente (ESP) (1/1)
1973	José Manuel Fuente (ESP) (3/4)	Pedro Torres (ESP) (1/1)	José Luis Abilleira (ESP) (1/2)
1974	José Manuel Fuente (ESP) (4/4)	Domingo Perurena (ESP) (1/1)	José Luis Abilleira (ESP) (2/2)
1975	Francisco Galdós (ESP) (1/1)	Lucien Van Impe (BEL) (3/8)	Andrés Oliva (ESP) (1/5)
1975	Andrés Oliva (ESP) (2/5)	Lucien Van Impe (BEL) (3/8)	Andrés Oliva (ESP) (1/5)
1976	Andrés Oliva (ESP) (4/5)	Giancarlo Bellini (ITA) (1/1)	Andrés Oliva (ESP) (3/5)
1977	Faustino Fernández Oviés (ESP) (1/1)	Lucien Van Impe (BEL) (4/8)	Pedro Torres (ESP) (1/1)
1978	Ueli Sutter (SUI) (1/1)	Mariano Martínez (FRA) (1/1)	Andrés Oliva (ESP) (5/5)
1979	Claudio Bortolotto (ITA) (1/3)	Giovanni Battaglin (ITA) (1/1)	Felipe Yáñez (ESP) (1/2)
1980	Claudio Bortolotto (ITA) (2/3)	Raymond Martin (FRA) (1/1)	Juan Fernández (ESP) (1/1)
1981	Claudio Bortolotto (ITA) (3/3)	Lucien Van Impe (BEL) (5/8)	José Luis Laguía (ESP) (1/5)
1982	Lucien Van Impe (BEL) (6/8)	Bernard Vallet (FRA) (1/1)	José Luis Laguía (ESP) (2/5)
1983	Lucien Van Impe (BEL) (7/8)	Lucien Van Impe (BEL) (8/8)	José Luis Laguía (ESP) (3/5)
1984	Laurent Fignon (FRA) (1/1)	Robert Millar (GBR) (1/1)	Felipe Yáñez (ESP) (2/2)
1985	José Luis Navarro (ESP) (1/1)	Luis Herrera (COL) (1/5)	José Luis Laguía (ESP) (4/5)
1986	Pedro Muñoz Machín Rodríguez (ESP) (1/1)	Bernard Hinault (FRA) (1/1)	José Luis Laguía (ESP) (5/5)
1987	Robert Millar (GBR) (2/2)	Luis Herrera (COL) (3/5)	Luis Herrera (COL) (2/5)
1988	Andrew Hampsten (USA) (1/1)	Steven Rooks (NED) (1/1)	Álvaro Pino (ESP) (1/1)
1989	Luis Herrera (COL) (4/5)	Gert-Jan Theunisse (NED) (1/1)	Óscar Vargas (COL) (1/1)
1990	Claudio Chiappucci (ITA) (1/5)	Thierry Claveyrolat (FRA) (1/1)	José Martín Farfán (COL) (1/1)
1991	Iñaki Gastón (ESP) (1/1)	Claudio Chiappucci (ITA) (2/5)	Luis Herrera (COL) (5/5)
1992	Claudio Chiappucci (ITA) (3/5)	Claudio Chiappucci (ITA) (4/5)	Carlos Hernández (ESP) (1/1)
1993	Claudio Chiappucci (ITA) (5/5)	Tony Rominger (SUI) (2/3)	Tony Rominger (SUI) (1/3)
1994	Pascal Richard (SUI) (1/1)	Richard Virenque (FRA) (1/7)	Luc Leblanc (FRA) (1/1)
1995	Mariano Piccoli (ITA) (1/2)	Richard Virenque (FRA) (2/7)	Laurent Jalabert (FRA) (1/3)
1996	Mariano Piccoli (ITA) (2/2)	Richard Virenque (FRA) (3/7)	Tony Rominger (SUI) (3/3)
1997	José Jaime González (COL) (1/2)	Richard Virenque (FRA) (4/7)	José María Jiménez (ESP) (1/4)
1998	Marco Pantani (ITA) (1/1)	Christophe Rinero (FRA) (1/1)	José María Jiménez (ESP) (2/4)
1999	José Jaime González (COL) (2/2)	Richard Virenque (FRA) (5/7)	José María Jiménez (ESP) (3/4)
2000	Francesco Casagrande (ITA) (1/1)	Santiago Botero (COL) (1/1)	Carlos Sastre (ESP) (1/2)
2001	Fredy González (COL) (1/2)	Laurent Jalabert (FRA) (2/3)	José María Jiménez (ESP) (4/4)
2002	Julio Perez Cuapio (MEX) (1/1)	Laurent Jalabert (FRA) (3/3)	Aitor Osa (ESP) (1/1)
2003	Fredy González (COL) (2/2)	Richard Virenque (FRA) (6/7)	Félix Cárdenas (COL) (1/2)
2004	Fabian Wegmann (GER) (1/1)	Richard Virenque (FRA) (7/7)	Félix Cárdenas (COL) (2/2)
2005	José Rujano Guillén (VEN) (1/1)	Michael Rasmussen (DEN) (1/2)	Joaquim Rodríguez (ESP) (1/1)
2006	Juan Manuel Gárate (ESP) (1/1)	Michael Rasmussen (DEN) (2/2)	Egoi Martínez (ESP) (1/2)
2007	Leonardo Piepoli (ITA) (1/1)	Mauricio Soler (COL) (1/1)	Denis Menchov (RUS) (1/1)
2008	Emanuele Sella (ITA) (1/1)	Carlos Sastre (ESP)^{[B]} (2/2)	David Moncoutié (FRA) (1/4)
2009	Stefano Garzelli (ITA) (1/2)	Egoi Martínez (ESP)^{[A]} (2/2)	David Moncoutié (FRA) (2/4)
2010	Matthew Lloyd (AUS) (1/1)	Anthony Charteau (FRA) (1/1)	David Moncoutié (FRA) (3/4)
2011	Stefano Garzelli (ITA) (2/2)	Samuel Sánchez (ESP) (1/1)	David Moncoutié (FRA) (4/4)
2012	Matteo Rabottini (ITA) (1/1)	Thomas Voeckler (FRA) (1/1)	Simon Clarke (AUS) (1/1)
2013	Stefano Pirazzi (ITA) (1/1)	Nairo Quintana (COL) (1/1)	Nicolas Edet (FRA) (1/1)
2014	Julián Arredondo (COL) (1/1)	Rafał Majka (POL) (1/2)	Luis León Sánchez (ESP) (1/1)
2015	Giovanni Visconti (ITA) (1/1)	Chris Froome (GBR) (1/2)	Omar Fraile (ESP) (1/2)
2016	Mikel Nieve (ESP) (1/1)	Rafał Majka (POL) (2/2)	Omar Fraile (ESP) (2/2)
2017	Mikel Landa (ESP) (1/1)	Warren Barguil (FRA) (1/1)	Davide Villella (ITA) (1/1)
2018	Chris Froome (GBR) (2/2)	Julian Alaphilippe (FRA) (1/1)	Thomas De Gendt (BEL) (1/1)
2019	Giulio Ciccone (ITA) (1/3)	Romain Bardet (FRA) (1/1)	Geoffrey Bouchard (FRA) (1/2)
2020	Ruben Guerreiro (POR) (1/1)	Tadej Pogačar (SLO) (1/4)	Guillaume Martin (FRA) (1/1)
2021	Geoffrey Bouchard (FRA) (2/2)	Tadej Pogačar (SLO) (2/4)	Michael Storer (AUS) (1/1)
2022	Koen Bouwman (NED) (1/1)	Jonas Vingegaard (DEN) (1/1)	Richard Carapaz (ECU) (1/3)
2023	Thibaut Pinot (FRA) (1/1)	Giulio Ciccone (ITA) (2/3)	Remco Evenepoel (BEL) (1/1)
2024	Tadej Pogačar (SLO) (3/4)	Richard Carapaz (ECU) (2/3)	Jay Vine (AUS) (1/2)
2025	Lorenzo Fortunato (ITA) (1/1)	Tadej Pogačar (SLO) (4/4)	Jay Vine (AUS) (2/2)
2026	Giulio Ciccone (ITA) (3/3)	Richard Carapaz (ECU) (3/3)	Santiago Buitrago (COL) (1/1)
Year	Giro d'Italia	Tour de France	Vuelta a España

Notes

A. ^{a} Franco Pellizotti was the Mountains leader but later had his results removed after his biological passport indicated irregular values, but the classification has not been remade yet. Egoi Martínez was ranked second and later declared winner.
B. ^{b} Bernhard Kohl was the Mountains leader but later had his results removed after a positive test for MIRCERA and admission to the use of doping. Carlos Sastre was ranked second and later declared winner.

=== Most wins ===
Two riders have won the "King of the Mountains" in the Tour de France six times: Federico Bahamontes (Spain) and Lucien Van Impe (Belgium), while Richard Virenque (France) holds the record with seven wins. Gino Bartali holds the record for the Giro d'Italia, also with seven wins, while José Luis Laguía has won the Vuelta equivalent five times.

Rank	Rider	Total	Giro	Tour	Vuelta
1	(Spain) Federico Bahamontes	9	1 (1956)	6 (1954, 1958, 1959, 1962, 1963, 1964)	2 (1957, 1958)
1	(Italy) Gino Bartali	9	7 (1935, 1936, 1937, 1939, 1940, 1946, 1947)	2 (1938, 1948)	–
3	(Belgium) Lucien Van Impe	8	2 (1982, 1983)	6 (1971, 1972, 1975, 1977, 1981, 1983)	–
4	(France) Richard Virenque	7	–	7 (1994, 1995, 1996, 1997, 1999, 2003, 2004)	–
5	(Spain) Julio Jiménez	6	–	3 (1965, 1966, 1967)	3 (1963, 1964, 1965)
6	(Italy) Claudio Chiappucci	5	3 (1990, 1992, 1993)	2 (1991, 1992)	–
6	(Italy) Fausto Coppi	5	3 (1948, 1949, 1954)	2 (1949, 1952)	–
6	(Spain) José Manuel Fuente	5	4 (1971, 1972, 1973, 1974)	–	1 (1972)
6	(Colombia) Luis Herrera	5	1 (1989)	2 (1985, 1987)	1 (1987)
6	(Spain) José Luis Laguía	5	–	–	5 (1981, 1982, 1983, 1985, 1986)
6	(Spain) Andrés Oliva	5	2 (1975, 1976)	–	3 (1975, 1976, 1978)

=== Career triples ===
No rider has won the "King of the Mountains" in all three Grand Tours in the same year. Only two riders, Federico Bahamontes and Luis Herrera, have won all three competitions in different years.

Rider	Total	Giro	Tour	Vuelta
Federico Bahamontes (ESP)	9	1 (1956)	6 (1954, 1958, 1959, 1962, 1963, 1964)	2 (1957, 1958)
Luis Herrera (COL)	5	1 (1989)	2 (1985, 1987)	2 (1987, 1991)

=== Natural doubles ===
Ten riders have won two mountains classifications in a single year:

Giro d'Italia and Tour de France
1949	(Italy) Fausto Coppi
1956	(Luxembourg) Charly Gaul
1983	(Belgium) Lucien Van Impe
1992	(Italy) Claudio Chiappucci

Tour de France and Vuelta a España
1958	(Spain) Federico Bahamontes
1965	(Spain) Julio Jiménez
1987	(Colombia) Luis Herrera
1993	(Switzerland) Tony Rominger

Giro d'Italia and Vuelta a España
1972	(Spain) Manuel Fuente
1975	(Spain) Andrés Oliva
1976	(Spain) Andrés Oliva

== Days leading classification ==
In previous tours, sometimes a stage was broken in two (or three). "Days" column gives the number of times the cyclist was a classification leader at the end of the day. Numbers in brackets include split stages.

after the end of 2026 Vuelta a España

Legend
Current records
Rider was leading in all Grand Tours
Rider was leading in all Grand Tours in one season

Rank	Rider	Days	Leading span	Giro	Tour	Vuelta
1	(Spain) Federico Bahamontes	133 ^{(138)}	1954–1964	34 ^{(35)}	74 ^{(77)}	25 ^{(26)}
2	(Belgium) Lucien Van Impe	112 ^{(123)}	1971–1983	34 ^{(35)}	78 ^{(88)}	0
3	(Italy) Gino Bartali	98 ^{(113)}	1935–1948	73 ^{(83)}	25 ^{(30)}	0
4	(France) Richard Virenque	96	1992–2004	0	96	0
5	(Spain) Julio Jiménez	95 ^{(99)}	1961–1968	25	40 ^{(43)}	30 ^{(31)}
6	(Belgium) Eddy Merckx	92 ^{(97)}	1968–1976	56 ^{(57)}	36 ^{(40)}	0
7	(Spain) José Luis Laguía	90 ^{(94)}	1981–1986	0	0	90 ^{(94)}
8	(Spain) José Manuel Fuente	71 ^{(80)}	1971–1974	46 ^{(50)}	8 ^{(10)}	17 ^{(20)}
9	(Spain) José Luis Abilleira	66 ^{(75)}	1973–1976	0	0	66 ^{(75)}
10	(Slovenia) Tadej Pogačar	64	2020–2026	20	40	4
11	(Italy) Fausto Coppi	61	1940–1954	37	24	0
12	(Colombia) Luis Herrera	59 ^{(61)}	1985–1991	8 ^{(9)}	25 ^{(26)}	26
13	(Spain) Julián Berrendero	55 ^{(62)}	1936–1947	0	9 ^{(13)}	46 ^{(49)}
14	(Switzerland) Tony Rominger	55 ^{(56)}	1989–1996	10	10	35 ^{(36)}

Only four other riders were leading mountains classification in all three Grand Tours: Aurelio González Puente, Karsten Kroon, Tim Wellens and Jonas Vingegaard.

The rider with the most Grand Tour days on the top of the King of the Mountains classification in one season is Federico Bahamontes - 31 in 1958. José Manuel Fuente amassed a record 34 stages (including split stages) across 29 days as a KoM leader in one calendar year (1972).
