= 1974 Vuelta a España =

Race details
- Dates: 23 April – 12 May
- Stages: 19 stages + Prologue, including 3 split stages
- Distance: 2,987 km (1,856 mi)
- Winning time: 86h 48' 18"

Results
Jersey awarded to the overall winner	Winner	José Manuel Fuente (ESP)	(Kas–Kaskol)
	Second	Joaquim Agostinho (POR)	(Bic)
	Third	Miguel María Lasa (ESP)	(Kas–Kaskol)
Jersey awarded to the points classification winner	Points	Domingo Perurena (ESP)	(Kas–Kaskol)
	Mountains	José Luis Abilleira (ESP)	(La Casera)
Jersey awarded to the combination classification winner	Combination	José Luis Abilleira (ESP)	(La Casera)
	Sprints	Javier Elorriaga (ESP)	(Kas–Kaskol)
	Team	Kas–Kaskol	

The 29th Edition Vuelta a España (Tour of Spain), a long-distance bicycle stage race and one of the three grand tours, was held from 23 April to 12 May 1974. It consisted of 19 stages covering a total of 2,987 km (1,856 mi), and was won by José Manuel Fuente of the Kas–Kaskol cycling team. José Luis Albilleira won the mountains classification while Domingo Perurena won the points classification.

== Route ==
List of stages
Stage	Date	Course	Distance	Type	Winner
P	23 April	Almería to Almería	5 km (3 mi)	Individual time trial	Roger Swerts (BEL)
1	24 April	Almería to Almería	98 km (61 mi)		Eddy Peelman (BEL)
2	25 April	Almería to Granada	187 km (116 mi)		Eric Leman (BEL)
3	26 April	Granada to Fuengirola	161 km (100 mi)		Rik Van Linden (BEL)
4	27 April	Marbella to Seville	206 km (128 mi)		Rik Van Linden (BEL)
5	28 April	Seville to Córdoba	139 km (86 mi)		Domingo Perurena (ESP)
6	29 April	Córdoba to Ciudad Real	211 km (131 mi)		Eddy Peelman (BEL)
7	30 April	Ciudad Real to Toledo	126 km (78 mi)		Domingo Perurena (ESP)
8a	1 May	Toledo to Madrid	167 km (104 mi)		Roger Swerts (BEL)
8b	1 May	Circuito del Jarama	4 km (2 mi)	Team time trial	Kas–Kaskol
9	2 May	Madrid to Los Ángeles de San Rafael	158 km (98 mi)		José Manuel Fuente (ESP)
10a	3 May	Los Ángeles de San Rafael to Los Ángeles de San Rafael	5 km (3 mi)	Individual time trial	Raymond Delisle (FRA)
10b	3 May	Los Ángeles de San Rafael to Ávila	125 km (78 mi)		Martin Martinez (FRA)
11	4 May	Ávila to Valladolid	168 km (104 mi)		José Luis Uribezubia (ESP)
12	5 May	Valladolid to León	203 km (126 mi)		Roger Swerts (BEL)
13	6 May	León to Monte Naranco	128 km (80 mi)		José Manuel Fuente (ESP)
14	7 May	Oviedo to Cangas de Onís	134 km (83 mi)		Joaquim Agostinho (POR)
15	8 May	Cangas de Onís to Laredo	210 km (130 mi)		Juan Manuel Santisteban (ESP)
16	9 May	Laredo to Bilbao	133 km (83 mi)		Gerben Karstens (NED)
17	10 May	Bilbao to Miranda de Ebro	157 km (98 mi)		Agustín Tamames (ESP)
18	11 May	Miranda de Ebro to Eibar	152 km (94 mi)		Agustín Tamames (ESP)
19a	12 May	Eibar to San Sebastián	79 km (49 mi)		Manuel Antonio García (ESP)
19b	12 May	San Sebastián to San Sebastián	35.9 km (22 mi)	Individual time trial	Joaquim Agostinho (POR)
	Total		2,987 km (1,856 mi)		

== Results ==
=== Final General Classification ===
Rank	Rider	Team	Time
1	(Spain) José Manuel Fuente	Kas–Kaskol	86h 48' 18"
2	(Portugal) Joaquim Agostinho	Bic	+ 11"
3	(Spain) Miguel María Lasa	Kas–Kaskol	+ 1' 09"
4	(Spain) Luis Ocaña	Bic	+ 1' 58"
5	(Spain) Domingo Perurena	Kas–Kaskol	+ 4' 29"
6	(Spain) José Antonio Gonzalez	Kas–Kaskol	+ 5' 56"
7	(France) Jean-Pierre Danguillaume	Peugeot–BP–Michelin	+ 6' 29"
8	(Spain) José Luis Uribezubia	Kas–Kaskol	+ 6' 33"
9	(Spain) Ventura Díaz	Monteverde	+ 8' 25"
10	(Belgium) Roger Swerts	Ijsboerke	+ 8' 28"
11	(Portugal) Fernando Mendes	Benfica	
12	(Spain) Antonio Vallori	La Casera	
13	(Spain) José Luis Abilleira	La Casera	
14	(Spain) Antonio Menéndez	Kas–Kaskol	
15	(France) Régis Ovion	Peugeot–BP–Michelin	
16	(Spain) Javier Francisco Elorriago	Kas–Kaskol	
17	(Spain) Agustín Tamames	Benfica	
18	(Belgium) Jan Van De Wiele	MIC-De Gribaldy	
19	(Spain) Juan Zurano Jérez	La Casera	
20	(Spain) Santiago Lazcano	Kas–Kaskol	
21	(Spain) José Antonio Pontón	La Casera	
22	(Belgium) Eric Leman	MIC-De Gribaldy	
23	(Belgium) Noël Van Clooster	MIC-De Gribaldy	
24	(Spain) Jesús Manzaneque Sánchez	La Casera	
25	(Portugal) Venceslau Fernandes	Benfica	
