= Cássio Freitas =

Brazilian cyclist

Personal information
- Full name: Cássio Freitas de Paiva
- Born: 31 August 1965 (age 61) Belo Horizonte, Brazil

Cycling career
- Sport: Cycling
- Current team: Retired
- Discipline: Road
- Role: Rider

Amateur team
- 2001: Caloi–Chevrolet

Professional teams
- 1989: Louletano–Vale do Lobo
- 1990–1991: Sicasal–Acral
- 1992–1996: Recer–Boavista
- 1997: Troiamarisco–Grupo Costa–Pais
- 1998: LA Alumínios–Pecol
- 2000: Cantanhede–Marquês de Marialva–Bairrada

Cássio Freitas (born 31 August 1965) is a Brazilian former cyclist. Professional from 1989 to 2000, he won the Volta ao Algarve in 1993 and 1995 and the 1992 Volta a Portugal. He also competed in two events at the 1988 Summer Olympics and three editions of the Vuelta a España.

== Major results ==
1987
1st Overall Tour de Santa Catarina
1989
2nd Overall Volta a Portugal
1990
1st Stage 3 Vuelta a La Rioja
7th Overall Tour de Luxembourg
1991
2nd Overall Grande Prémio Jornal de Notícias

1st Stages 2 & 4

9th Overall Tour de Luxembourg
1992
1st Overall Volta a Portugal

1st Stage 12

1st Overall Grande Prémio Jornal de Notícias

1st Stage 5

8th Overall Route du Sud
1993
1st Overall Volta ao Algarve

1st Stage 6 (ITT)

1st Overall Grande Prémio O Jogo
1st Stage 5 Grande Prémio Abimota
2nd Overall Grande Prémio Jornal de Notícias
4th Overall Volta a Portugal
1994
7th Overall Volta a Portugal
1995
1st Overall Volta ao Algarve

1st Stage 7

2nd Overall Troféu Joaquim Agostinho
5th Overall Volta a Portugal
1996
1st Porto–Lisboa
1st Prologue Grande Prémio Jornal de Notícias
1st Stage 5 GP Costa Azul
1997
2nd Overall Volta ao Algarve
1998
1st Road race, South American Games
1st Overall Vuelta a Mendoza
2nd Road race, Pan American Road Championships
5th Overall Volta ao Algarve
2000
1st Overall Tour de Santa Catarina
2001
1st Time trial, National Road Championships
1st Overall Tour de Santa Catarina
2005
6th Overall Volta Ciclística de Porto Alegre
2006
6th Overall Tour de Santa Catarina
