= Manuel Cunha =

Portuguese cyclist

Personal information
- Full name: Manuel António Tavares Cunha
- Born: 31 August 1962 (age 64) Pedroso, Vila Nova de Gaia, Portugal

Cycling career
- Sport: Cycling
- Current team: Retired
- Discipline: Road
- Role: Rider

Amateur teams
- 1982–1983: FC Porto–UBP
- 1984: Ovarense–Alfaias Herculano

Professional teams
- 1985–1986: Lousa–Trinaranjus–Akai
- 1987: Sicasal–Toreensse
- 1988–1989: CLAS
- 1990: Avibom–Valouro–Lousa
- 1991: Calbrita–Akai–Lousa
- 1992–1993: Sicasal–Acral
- 1994: Hipermercados Jumbo–Maia

Major wins
- Volta a Portugal (1987); Volta ao Algarve (1986, 1987)

Manuel António Tavares Cunha (born 31 August 1962) is a Portuguese former road cyclist. Professional from 1985 to 1994, he most notably won the 1987 Volta a Portugal and the 1987 and 1986 Volta ao Algarve. He also rode in four editions of the Vuelta a España.

== Major results ==
1983
1st Stage 8 Volta ao Algarve
7th Overall Volta a Portugal

1st Stage 10

1984
3rd Overall Volta a Portugal

1st Stage 9b

3rd Overall Volta ao Algarve
1985
2nd Overall Volta ao Alentejo
2nd Porto–Lisboa
2nd Overall Grande Prémio Jornal de Notícias
6th Overall Volta a Portugal
1986
1st Overall Volta ao Algarve
1st Overall Grande Prémio do Concelho de Loures

1st Stage 4

3rd Road race, National Road Championships
6th Overall Volta a Portugal

1st Prologue (ITT)

1987
1st Overall Volta a Portugal

1st Prologue (ITT)

1st Overall Volta ao Algarve
1st Overall GP Costa Azul
1st Stage 2 Grande Prémio Jornal de Notícias
1st Overall Grande Prémio de Pereiro-Macao

1st Stage 3

1st Overall Clássica de Alcochete

1st Stage 1

1st Grande Prémio Internacional Costa Azul
1st Prologue GP Costa Azul
1988
1st Stage 2 Tour des Trois Cantons
2nd Overall Vuelta a los Valles Mineros
6th Overall Volta a Portugal

1st Stage 9

1990
1st Overall GP Costa Azul

1st Stage 3

3rd Overall Volta ao Algarve
7th Overall Volta a Portugal
1991
1st Overall Grande Prémio Jornal de Notícias

1st Prologue & Stage 5

1st Overall Grande Prémio do Minho

1st Stage 8b

1st Overall Grande Prémio Gondomar

1st Stage 3

1st Stage 7 Volta a Portugal
1992
1st Overall Grande Prémio Gondomar
3rd Overall Volta ao Alentejo
6th Overall Volta a Portugal
9th Overall Vuelta a Castilla y León
1993
3rd Overall Grande Prémio Jornal de Notícias

=== Grand Tour general classification results timeline ===
Grand Tour	1985	1986	1987	1988	1989	1990	1991	1992	1993
Giro d'Italia	—	—	—	—	—	—	—	—	—
Tour de France	—	—	—	—	—	—	—	—	—
Vuelta a España	30	—	—	30	98	—	—	—	62

Legend
DSQ	Disqualified
DNF	Did not finish
