= Cayn Theakston =

British road racing cyclist

Personal information
- Born: 17 March 1965 (age 61) Worcester, England

Cycling career
- Sport: Cycling
- Current team: Retired
- Discipline: Road
- Role: Rider

Professional teams
- 1986–1987: Fagor
- 1988–1989: Louletano–Vale do Lobo
- 1990: IOC–Tulip Computers

Cayn Theakston (born 17 March 1965) is a British former professional road racing cyclist.

== Major results ==
1988
1st Overall Volta a Portugal

1st Stage 14

1st Stages 7 & 8 Volta ao Algarve
3rd Overall Grande Prémio Jornal de Notícias

1st Prologue & Stage 8

1989
1st Overall Grande Prémio Internacional Costa Azul

1st Stage 3

1st Stage 13 Herald Sun Tour
1990
1st Prologue Milk Race
