= 1974 Giro d'Italia =

Race details
- Dates: 16 May – 9 June 1974
- Stages: 22, including one split stage
- Distance: 4,001 km (2,486 mi)
- Winning time: 113h 09 '13"

Results
Jersey awarded to the overall winner	Winner	Eddy Merckx (BEL)	(Molteni)
	Second	Gianbattista Baronchelli (ITA)	(Scic)
	Third	Felice Gimondi (ITA)	(Bianchi)
Jersey awarded to the points classification winner	Points	Roger De Vlaeminck (BEL)	(Brooklyn)
Jersey awarded to the mountains classification winner	Mountains	José Manuel Fuente (ESP)	(Kas)
	Team	Kas	

The 1974 Giro d'Italia was the 57th running of the Giro, one of cycling's Grand Tours. It started in Vatican City, on 16 May, with a 164 km (102 mi) stage and concluded in Milan, on 8 June, with 257 km (160 mi) leg. A total of 140 riders from fourteen teams entered the 22-stage race, that was won by Belgian Eddy Merckx of the Molteni team. The second and third places were taken by Italians Gianbattista Baronchelli (Scic) and Felice Gimondi (Bianchi), respectively.

Amongst the other classifications that the race awarded, Roger De Vlaeminck (Brooklyn) won the points classification and José Manuel Fuente of KAS won the mountains classification. KAS finished as the winners of the team points classification. Merckx's victory in the 1974 Giro was his first step in completing the Triple Crown of Cycling–winning the Giro d'Italia, the Tour de France, and the World Championship road race in one calendar year–becoming the first rider ever to do so.

== Teams ==
Fourteen teams were invited by the race organizers to participate in the 1974 edition of the Giro d'Italia In total, 87 riders were from Italy, while the remaining 53 riders came from: Belgium (20), Spain (11), Switzerland (7), Germany (6), Colombia (2), Denmark (2), Luxembourg (1), the Netherlands (1), New Zealand (1), Norway (1), and Sweden (1). Each team sent a squad of ten riders, which meant that the race started with a peloton of 140 cyclists.

Of those starting, 36 were riding the Giro d'Italia for the first time. The average age of riders was 27 years, ranging from 20–year–old Gianbattista Baronchelli (Scic) to 34–year–old Victor Van Schil (Molteni). The team with the youngest average rider age was Jollj Ceramica (24), while the oldest was Bianchi (28). From those that started, 96 made it to the finish in Milan.

The teams entering the race were:

- Bianchi
- Brooklyn
- Dreherforte
- Filcas
- Filotex
- Jollj Ceramica
- KAS
- Magniflex
- Molteni
- Ovest Rokado
- Sammontana
- Scic
- Vibor
- Zonca

== Pre-race favorites ==
Reigning champion and four-time winner Eddy Merckx (Molteni) returned to the race in 1974 to defend his crown and to claim fifth victory and join the likes of Alfredo Binda and Fausto Coppi who also had five Giro victories. He arrived to the race the day before after racing in the Four Days of Dunkirk. Merckx came into the Giro d'Italia after not having won a single spring classic for the first time since 1965. In March, he was forced to take a rest from cycling due to a respiratory ailment. Merckx gradually returned to racing after beating the illness in late March, and writer Giuliano Califano stated that several experts found him to be in great form coming into the Giro. La Stampa writer Gianni Pignata felt Merckx's form and his poor performances in the early season would provide motivation for this race. In particular, he referenced Merckx's poor sprinting in the early season and how the Giro was his first race longer than seven stages this season. Merckx himself told a radiohost "After my long illness, I am now in an increasing form and I estimate myself already for 80 hundred of my means," before the race started.

José Manuel Fuente (Kas) was thought to have entered the Giro in good form after winning the Vuelta a España weeks earlier. Pignata commented that Fuente would provide Merckx a stiff opposition through his ability to attack in the mountains, but his poor time trialing ability was his weakness. l'Unita interviewed several of the riders and many named Merckx as the favorite to take the victory. The third main contender to win the race named by the media was reigning world champion Felice Gimondi (Bianchi). Gimondi was viewed to have a strong team for support which included former world champion and sprinter Marino Basso, Antoine Houbrechts, and Martín Emilio Rodríguez, among others. Gimondi downplayed his chances stating that he was not 20 year-old anymore and "... it takes me a long time to get into action."

Scic's Gianbattista Baronchelli, Tour de l'Avenir winner Giovanni Battaglin (Jolly Ceramica), and Francesco Moser (Filcas) as three young riders who have the potential to become stars during the race. Despite suffering an accident early in the season, Pignata believed Battaglin's participation in the Tour de Romandie provided a great lead-up into the Giro. Moser was thought to have a strong season and showed a sprinting prowess as evidenced by his second place in Paris–Roubaix. Pignata ultimately concluded that these younger riders should not be cautious during the race as it would play into the hands of Merckx, who then would only have to react to Fuente's attacks. Amid rumors of not participating, Luis Ocaña confirmed his absence due to bronchitis three days prior to the start. La Stampa columnist Maurizio Caravella gave Merckx a 60% chance to win, while giving Gimondi, Fuente, and Battaglin at 10% chance and Baronchelli and Moser a 5% chance at victory. The peloton also featured 1971 winner Gösta Pettersson (Magniflex).

== Route and stages ==
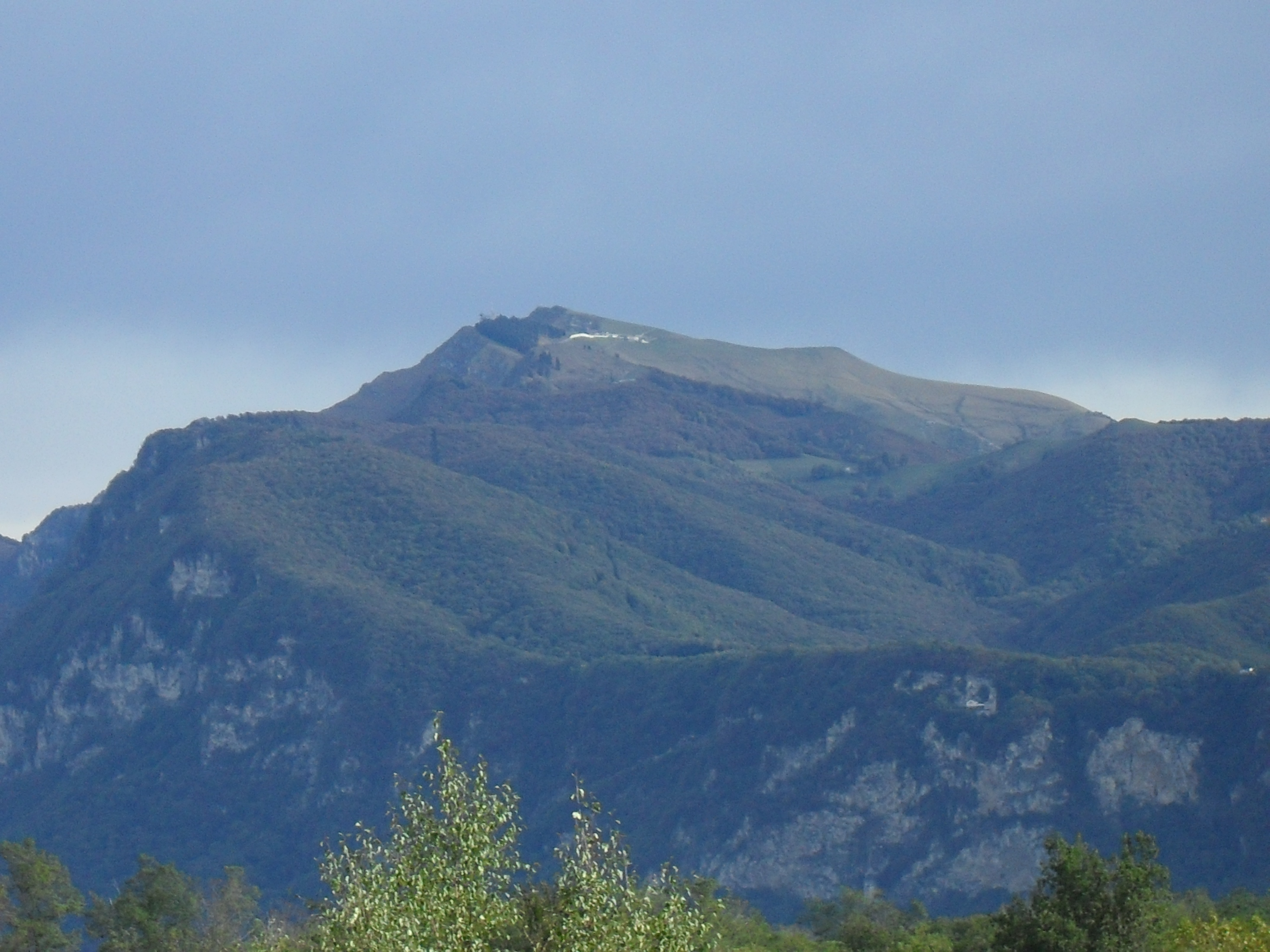
Monte Generoso hosted the end of the 158 km (98 mi) sixteenth stage.

The route for the 1974 edition of the Giro d'Italia was revealed to the public by race director Vincenzo Torriani on 29 March 1974. It contained one were individual time trial. There were eleven stages containing twenty three categorized climbs, of which four had summit finishes: stage 11a, to Il Cioccio; stage 16, to Monte Generoso; stage 18, to Borgo Valsugana; and stage 20, to Tre Cime di Lavaredo. In total the race route contained 26.78 km (17 mi) of official climbing across the twenty-three climbs. The organizers chose to include two rest days, in Capri and Sanremo. When compared to the previous year's race, the race was 200 km (124 mi) longer, lacked a prologue, and had the same number of rest days and individual time trials. In addition, this race contained two more stages, as well as one more set of half stages. In Italy, the race was televised daily in thirty-minute segments at during the evening on the second channel of RAI. The race, however, was still to be broadcast normally over radio.

Upon the release of the route in March, La Stampa writer Gianni Pignata believed that the first leg of the split eleventh stage, to Il Cioccio, along with stages 20 and 21, which featured eight total climbs in the Dolomites, would be decisive in determining the race's winner. Pignata believed this edition of the Giro d'Italia was geared towards climbers. He added that if a rider wanted to best Merckx, he would need to make his move earlier in the race and not wait for the Dolomites, as Merckx would likely be in top form by then. After looking over the race route, Italian rider Basso stated that there were few opportunities for sprinters to try and win a stage. Two-time winner Gimondi felt the race started off hard and agreed with Pignata and Basso, in that the race favored climbers and lacked chances for sprint finishes. He stated that the route suited the riding styles of Ocaña, Merckx, and Jose Manuel Fuente. In addition, Gimondi criticized Torriani for placing a rest day in after the third day of racing, stating that there was no justification for it there. The route did not enter the high mountains until 27 May, which was thought to work against Fuente's chances to win the race and take advantage of Merckx's unknown condition.

Stage characteristics and results
Stage	Date	Course	Distance	Type	Winner
1	16 May	Vatican City (Vatican City) to Formia	164 km (102 mi)	Plain stage	Wilfried Reybrouck (BEL)
2	17 May	Formia to Pompei	121 km (75 mi)	Plain stage	Patrick Sercu (BEL)
3	18 May	Pompei to Sorrento	137 km (85 mi)	Stage with mountain(s)	José Manuel Fuente (ESP)
	19 May	Rest day			
4	20 May	Sorrento to Sapri	208 km (129 mi)	Plain stage	Roger De Vlaeminck (BEL)
5	21 May	Sapri to Taranto	215 km (134 mi)	Plain stage	Piermattia Gavazzi (ITA)
6	22 May	Taranto to Foggia	206 km (128 mi)	Plain stage	Franco Bitossi (ITA)
7	23 May	Foggia to Chieti	257 km (160 mi)	Plain stage	Ugo Colombo (ITA)
8	24 May	Chieti to Macerata	150 km (93 mi)	Plain stage	Franco Bitossi (ITA)
9	25 May	Macerata to Carpegna	191 km (119 mi)	Stage with mountain(s)	José Manuel Fuente (ESP)
10	26 May	Carpegna to Modena	205 km (127 mi)	Plain stage	Patrick Sercu (BEL)
11a	27 May	Modena to Il Ciocco	153 km (95 mi)	Stage with mountain(s)	José Manuel Fuente (ESP)
11b	27 May	Il Ciocco to Forte dei Marmi	62 km (39 mi)	Plain stage	Patrick Sercu (BEL)
12	28 May	Forte dei Marmi to Forte dei Marmi	40 km (25 mi)	Individual time trial	Eddy Merckx (BEL)
13	29 May	Forte dei Marmi to Pietra Ligure	231 km (144 mi)	Plain stage	Enrico Paolini (ITA)
14	30 May	Pietra Ligure to Sanremo	189 km (117 mi)	Stage with mountain(s)	Giuseppe Perletto (ITA)
15	31 May	Sanremo to Valenza	206 km (128 mi)	Plain stage	Ercole Gualazzini (ITA)
	1 June	Rest day			
16	2 June	Valenza to Monte Generoso	158 km (98 mi)	Stage with mountain(s)	José Manuel Fuente (ESP)
17	3 June	Como to Iseo	158 km (98 mi)	Stage with mountain(s)	Santiago Lazcano (ESP)
18	4 June	Iseo to Sella Valsugana	190 km (118 mi)	Stage with mountain(s)	Franco Bitossi (ITA)
19	5 June	Borgo Valsugana to Pordenone	146 km (91 mi)	Plain stage	Enrico Paolini (ITA)
20	6 June	Pordenone to Tre Cime di Lavaredo	163 km (101 mi)	Stage with mountain(s)	José Manuel Fuente (ESP)
21	7 June	Misurina to Bassano del Grappa	194 km (121 mi)	Stage with mountain(s)	Eddy Merckx (BEL)
22	8 June	Bassano del Grappa to Milan	257 km (160 mi)	Plain stage	Marino Basso (ITA)
	Total		4,001 km (2,486 mi)		

== Race overview ==
The first day of racing was gearing up to finish with a bunch sprint, when neo-professional cyclist Wilfried Reybrouck attacked with 400 meters to go. Reybrouck managed to hold off the chasing sprinters Roger De Vlaeminck and Basso, among others to win the stage. A strike had been rumored to happen on the race route near Naples, which caused the riders to stick together and not attack. The pack of riders finished together, with Belgian Patrick Sercu taking the stage victory. The third stage featured a late climb of Mount Faito, where José Manuel Fuente attacked ten kilometers from the summit and rode 25 kilometers solo to the finish. Merckx, Baronchelli, Gimondi, Moser, and other general classification hopefuls remained behind and attacked each other within the group until the finish. The group finished 33 seconds after Fuente, but Merckx, who had been dropped, lost 42 seconds to Fuente, along with some other riders. Race leader Reybrouck lost the lead to Fuente upon finishing thirty minutes behind and ultimately being eliminated from the race because he finished outside the time limit. This was the first time a rider had gone from leading the race to being disqualified after the next stage in the race's history.

The following stage was interrupted 102 kilometers into the day for five minutes because of a strike conducted in response to a dam built. Pierino Gavazzi won the first stage of his career upon beating the likes of De Vlaeminck and Franco Bitossi. During the sprint, José Gonzales Linares and Jos Huysmans led out their teammates respective teammates Fuente and Merckx, but were found guilty of illegally boosting their teammates during the sprint. The four riders were fined 50,000 lire each and relegated to 37th position on the stage. The sixth leg had little action until the final twenty kilometers, when the headwinds picked up and splintered the peloton into several groups just hundreds of meters apart. Giacinto Santambrogio made a move closer to the finish line and rode solo until Bitossi joined him. Eventually Bitossi dropped Santambrogio and then held off the charging sprinters in order to win the day, which was his 100th career victory.

Ugo Colombo won the race's seventh leg after telling race leader Fuente he was riding up the road to greet some family - as is custom - although none of his family lived anywhere near the region. Colombo was allowed a maximum advantage of around thirteen minutes before the peloton closed the gap to within one minute. The race for second place brought out the general classification contenders as there was a slight incline near the end of the stage. In particular, Francesco Moser, Merckx, and De Vlaeminck attacked several times and Fuente could not counter, allowing the riders to gain seven seconds on the race lead. The eighth leg of the race was a rather flat stage that featured heavy winds throughout the stage. During the stage a dog ran in the road and caused a reaction in the peloton, but no injuries or falls were reported. As the main field rode under the kilometer to go banner, they had just caught the leading rider Zilioli who had made a last ditch solo effort to win the stage. Merckx opened up the sprint as the group made the final bend into the final 200 meters. His wheel skidded out and forced him to ride and graze the barriers, which hindered several sprinters who had been using his slipstream. Bitossi and Martín Emilio Rodríguez (Bianchi) contested the sprint the best, with Bitossi taking the day after coming of Rodríguez' wheel.

=== Doping ===
There were doping controls.

== Classification leadership ==
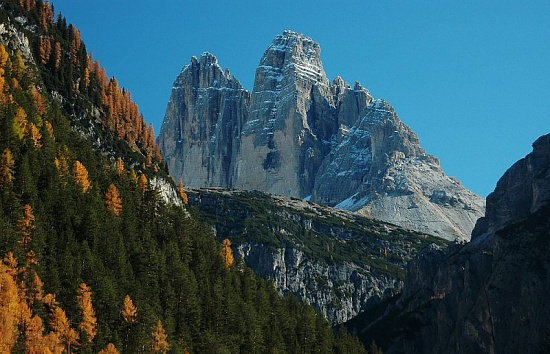
The Tre Cime di Lavaredo was the Cima Coppi for the 1974 running of the Giro d'Italia.

There were three main individual classifications contested in the 1974 Giro d'Italia, as well as a team competition. Three of them awarded jerseys to their leaders. The general classification was the most important and was calculated by adding each rider's finishing times on each stage. The rider with the lowest cumulative time was the winner of the general classification and was considered the overall winner of the Giro. The rider leading the classification wore a pink jersey to signify the classification's leadership.

The second classification was the points classification. Riders received points for finishing in the top positions in a stage finish, with first place getting the most points, and lower placings getting successively fewer points. The rider leading this classification wore a purple (or cyclamen) jersey.

The mountains classification was the third classification and for the first time in Giro history its leader was denoted by the green jersey. In this ranking, points were won by reaching the summit of a climb ahead of other cyclists. Each climb was ranked as either first, second or third category, with more points available for higher category climbs. Most stages of the race included one or more categorized climbs, in which points were awarded to the riders that reached the summit first. The Cima Coppi, the race's highest point of elevation, awarded more points than the other first category climbs. The Cima Coppi for this Giro was the Tre Cime di Lavaredo. The first rider to cross the Tre Cime di Lavaredo was Spanish rider José Manuel Fuente.

The final classification, the team classification, awarded no jersey to its leaders. This was calculated by adding together points earned by each rider on the team during each stage through the intermediate sprints, the categorized climbs, stage finishes, etc. The team with the most points led the classification.

There were other minor classifications within the race, including the neo-professional competition. The classification was determined in the same way as the general classification, but considering only neo-professional cyclists (in their first three years of professional racing).

Another minor classification was the intermediate sprints classification, called the traguardi tricolori. On intermediate sprints, the first rider received 30 points for this classification, and the second rider 10 points. No jersey was used to indicate the leader. There was no time bonus at these intermediate sprints, and no points for the points classification.

Classification leadership by stage
Stage	Winner	General classification	Points classification	Mountains classification	Intermediate sprints classification	Team classification
1	Wilfried Reybrouck	Wilfried Reybrouck	Wilfried Reybrouck	not awarded	Tullio Rossi	Filcas
2	Patrick Sercu	Wilfried Reybrouck	Roger De Vlaeminck	not awarded	?	Brooklyn
3	José Manuel Fuente	José Manuel Fuente	Roger De Vlaeminck	José Manuel Fuente	?	?
4	Roger De Vlaeminck	José Manuel Fuente	Roger De Vlaeminck	José Manuel Fuente	?	Brooklyn
5	Pierino Gavazzi	José Manuel Fuente	Roger De Vlaeminck	José Manuel Fuente	?	Brooklyn
6	Franco Bitossi	José Manuel Fuente	Roger De Vlaeminck	José Manuel Fuente	?	Brooklyn
7	Ugo Colombo	José Manuel Fuente	Roger De Vlaeminck	José Manuel Fuente	?	Brooklyn
8	Franco Bitossi	José Manuel Fuente	Roger De Vlaeminck	José Manuel Fuente	?	Brooklyn
9	José Manuel Fuente	José Manuel Fuente	Roger De Vlaeminck	José Manuel Fuente	?	Brooklyn
10	Patrick Sercu	José Manuel Fuente	Roger De Vlaeminck	José Manuel Fuente	Marcello Osler	Brooklyn
11a	José Manuel Fuente	José Manuel Fuente	Roger De Vlaeminck	José Manuel Fuente	Marcello Osler	?
11b	Patrick Sercu	José Manuel Fuente	Roger De Vlaeminck	José Manuel Fuente	Marcello Osler	Brooklyn
12	Eddy Merckx	José Manuel Fuente	Roger De Vlaeminck	José Manuel Fuente	Marcello Osler	Brooklyn
13	Enrico Paolini	José Manuel Fuente	Roger De Vlaeminck	José Manuel Fuente	Marcello Osler	Brooklyn
14	Giuseppe Perletto	Eddy Merckx	Roger De Vlaeminck	José Manuel Fuente	Marcello Osler	Brooklyn
15	Ercole Gualazzini	Eddy Merckx	Roger De Vlaeminck	José Manuel Fuente	Marcello Osler	Brooklyn
16	José Manuel Fuente	Eddy Merckx	Roger De Vlaeminck	José Manuel Fuente	Marcello Osler	Brooklyn
17	Santiago Lazcano	Eddy Merckx	Roger De Vlaeminck	José Manuel Fuente	Marcello Osler	?
18	Franco Bitossi	Eddy Merckx	Roger De Vlaeminck	José Manuel Fuente	Marcello Osler	Brooklyn
19	Enrico Paolini	Eddy Merckx	Roger De Vlaeminck	José Manuel Fuente	Marcello Osler	?
20	José Manuel Fuente	Eddy Merckx	Roger De Vlaeminck	José Manuel Fuente	Marcello Osler	Kas-Kaskol
21	Marino Basso	Eddy Merckx	Roger De Vlaeminck	José Manuel Fuente	Marcello Osler	Kas-Kaskol
22	Gianni Motta	Eddy Merckx	Roger De Vlaeminck	José Manuel Fuente	Marcello Osler	Kas-Kaskol
Final		Eddy Merckx	Roger De Vlaeminck	José Manuel Fuente	Marcello Osler	Kas-Kaskol

== Final standings ==
Legend
Pink jersey	Denotes the winner of the General classification
Purple jersey	Denotes the winner of the Points classification
Green jersey	Denotes the winner of the Mountains classification

=== General classification ===
Final general classification (1–10)
Rank	Name	Team	Time
1	Eddy Merckx (BEL)	Molteni	113h 08' 13"
2	Gianbattista Baronchelli (ITA)	Scic	+ 12"
3	Felice Gimondi (ITA)	Bianchi	+ 33"
4	Tino Conti (ITA)	Zonca	+ 2' 14"
5	José Manuel Fuente (ESP)	KAS	+ 3' 22"
6	Giovanni Battaglin (ITA)	Jolly Ceramica	+ 4' 22"
7	Francesco Moser (ITA)	Filcas	+ 6' 17"
8	Vicente López Carril (ESP)	KAS	+ 10' 28"
9	Franco Bitossi (ITA)	Scic	+ 16' 05"
10	Gösta Pettersson (SWE)	Magniflex	+ 17' 08"

=== Points classification ===
Final points classification (1–5)
	Rider	Team	Points
1	Roger De Vlaeminck (BEL)	Brooklyn	295
2	Franco Bitossi (ITA)	Scic	209
3	José Manuel Fuente (ESP)	KAS	171
4	Eddy Merckx (BEL)	Molteni	161
5	Francesco Moser (ITA)	Filcas	152

=== Mountains classification ===
Final mountains classification (1–10)
	Rider	Team	Points
1	José Manuel Fuente (ESP)	KAS	510
2	Eddy Merckx (BEL)	Molteni	330
3	Santiago Lazcano (ESP)	KAS	230
4	Giuseppe Perletto (ITA)	Sammontana	160
5	Gianbattista Baronchelli (ITA)	Scic	120
6	Tino Conti (ITA)	Zonca	100
7	José-Luis Uribezubia (ESP)	KAS	80
7	Franco Bitossi (ITA)	Scic	80
7	Vicente López Carril (ESP)	KAS	80
10	Gonzalo Aja (ESP)	KAS	70

=== Neo-professional classification ===
Final neo-professional classification (1–5)
	Rider	Team	Time
1	Gianbattista Baronchelli (ITA)	Scic	113h 08' 25"
2	Claudio Bortolotto (ITA)	Filcas	+ 1h 19' 22"
3	Johann Ruch (GER)	Rokado	+ 1h 26' 24"
4	Rafael Antonio Niño (COL)	Jolly Ceramica	+ 1h 28' 46"
5	Simone Fraccaro (ITA)	Filcas	+ 1h 52' 48"

=== Traguardi tricolori classification ===
Final traguardi tricolori classification (1–5)
	Rider	Team	Points
1	Marcello Osler (ITA)	Sammontana	210
2	Wilmo Francioni (ITA)	Sammontana	100
3	Ercole Gualazzini (ITA)	Brooklyn	80
4	Pietro Campagnari (ITA)	Dreherforte	70
4	Giuseppe Perletto (ITA)	Sammontana	70
4	Roger De Vlaeminck (BEL)	Brooklyn	70

=== Team classification ===
Final team classification (1–5)
	Team	Points
1	KAS	5,915
2	Brooklyn	5,151
3	Scic	3,821
4	Molteni	2,938
5	Jolly Ceramica	2,734

== Aftermath ==
This victory in the race gave Merckx five career victories at the Giro d'Italia, equaling the record of Binda and Coppi. In July, Merckx entered the Tour de France. He emerged victorious, winning eight stages en route to his fifth career Tour victory, again equaling the record for career Tour victories. He won the Tour by a margin of eight minutes and four seconds over the second-place finisher and thus became the only cyclist to win the Giro and Tour in the same year three times in a career. In August, he won the men's road race at the 1974 UCI Road World Championships and became the first rider to achieve the Triple Crown of Cycling, which consists of winning two Grand Tour races and the men's road race at the UCI Road World Championships in a calendar year. For his career successes in the Giro d'Italia, Merckx became the first rider inducted into the race's Hall of Fame in 2012. When being inducted, Merckx was given the modern-day trophy with the winners engraved until 1974, the last year he won the race.

== Doping ==
There was no positive doping test in the Giro of 1974.
