= Grande Prémio Jornal de Notícias =

Portuguese cycling race

Race details
- Date: May-June
- Region: Portugal
- Discipline: Road
- Type: Stage race

History
- First edition: 1979
- First winner: Francisco Miranda (POR)
- Most wins: Rafael Reis (POR) (3 wins)
- Most recent: Rafael Reis (POR)

Grande Prémio Jornal de Notícias is a multi-day road cycling race held annually in Portugal. It is sponsored by the daily Jornal de Notícias newspaper.

== Winners ==
Year	Winner	Second	Third
1979	(Portugal) Francisco Miranda	(Portugal) José Sousa Santos	(Portugal) António Alves
1980	(Portugal) Venceslau Fernandes	(Portugal) Abel Coelho	(Portugal) Luis Teixeira
1981	(Portugal) Alfredo Gouveia	(Portugal) Benjamim Carvalho	(Portugal) Marco Chagas
1982	(Portugal) Manuel Zeferino	(Portugal) Luis Teixeira	(Portugal) Benedito Ferreira
1983	(Portugal) Adelino Teixeira	(Portugal) Venceslau Fernandes	(Portugal) Benjamim Carvalho
1984	(Portugal) Eduardo Correia	(Portugal) Fernando Carvalho	(Portugal) Venceslau Fernandes
1985	(Portugal) Paulo Ferreira	(Portugal) Manuel Cunha	(Portugal) António Fernandes
1986	(Portugal) Fernando Carvalho	(Portugal) Benjamim Carvalho	(Portugal) Marino Fonseca
1987	(Portugal) Américo José Neves Da Silva	(Portugal) Venceslau Fernandes	(Portugal) Eduardo Correia
1988	(Portugal) Manuel Correia	(Portugal) Manuel Abreu	(United Kingdom) Cayn Jack Theakston
1989	(Portugal) Fernando Carvalho	(Portugal) Antonio Pinto	(Portugal) Orlando Neves
1990	(Portugal) Jorge Silva	(Portugal) José Xavier	(Portugal) Eduardo Correia
1991	(Portugal) Manuel Cunha	(Brazil) Cássio Freitas	(Portugal) Delmino Pereira
1992	(Brazil) Cássio Freitas	(Portugal) Joaquim Andrade	(Portugal) Delmino Pereira
1993	(Portugal) Vítor Gamito	(Brazil) Cássio Freitas	(Portugal) Manuel Cunha
1994	(Spain) Francisco Cerezo	(Portugal) Carlos Pinho	(Portugal) João Silva
1995	(Portugal) Joaquim Gomes	(Portugal) Paulo Ferreira	(Portugal) Quintino Rodrigues
1996	(Portugal) Paulo Ferreira	(Portugal) Joaquim Gomes	(Portugal) Antonio Faisco
1997	(Russia) Evgeni Berzin	(Spain) Daniel Clavero	(Portugal) Cândido Barbosa
1998	(Latvia) Romāns Vainšteins	(Portugal) Vítor Gamito	(Spain) Álvaro González de Galdeano
1999	(Spain) Melcior Mauri	(Spain) José Alberto Martínez	(Portugal) Joaquim Adrego Andrade
2000	(Spain) Mikel Artetxe	(Portugal) José Azevedo	(Denmark) Claus Michael Møller
2001	(Spain) Joan Horrach	(Spain) Ángel Edo	(Spain) Iban Mayo
2002-2012	No race		
2013	(Portugal) César Fonte	(Spain) Delio Fernández	(Spain) Gustavo César Veloso
2014	No race		
2015	(Portugal) António Carvalho	(Spain) Diego Rubio	(Portugal) Bruno Silva
2016	(Portugal) Rafael Reis	(Portugal) António Carvalho	(Spain) Vicente García de Mateos
2017	(Spain) ~~Raúl Alarcón~~	(Portugal) João Benta	(Portugal) Rui Vinhas
2018	(Portugal) António Carvalho	(Portugal) Edgar Pinto	(Portugal) Joni Brandão
2019	(Portugal) Ricardo Mestre	(Portugal) Joni Brandão	(Spain) Alejandro Marque
2020	Not held due to COVID-19 Pandemic		
2021	(Portugal) Joaquim Silva	(Portugal) Ricardo Vilela	(Spain) Alejandro Marque
2022	(Uruguay) Mauricio Moreira	(Portugal) António Carvalho	(Portugal) Joaquim Silva
2023	(Portugal) Rafael Reis	(Portugal) Luís Fernandes	(Portugal) Henrique Casimiro
2024	(Portugal) Frederico Figueiredo	(Portugal) Tiago Antunes	(Portugal) Afonso Eulálio
2025	(Argentina) German Tivani	(Spain) Raúl Rota	(Portugal) Pedro Silva
2026	(Portugal) Rafael Reis	Artem Nych	(Portugal) Tiago Antunes
