= 1973 Tour de Suisse =

Race details
- Dates: 15–22 June 1973
- Stages: 8 + Prologue
- Distance: 1,289 km (800.9 mi)
- Winning time: 36h 36' 47"

Results
	Winner	José Manuel Fuente (ESP)	(Kas–Kaskol)
	Second	Donato Giuliani (ITA)	(Filotex)
	Third	Wladimiro Panizza (ITA)	(GBC–Sony)
	Points	Enrico Paolini (ITA)	(Scic)
	Mountains	José Manuel Fuente (ESP)	(Kas–Kaskol)
	Team	Scic	

The 1973 Tour de Suisse was the 37th edition of the Tour de Suisse cycle race and was held from 15 June to 23 June 1973. The race started in Zürich and finished in Olten. The race was won by José Manuel Fuente of the Kas team.

== General classification ==
Final general classification

Rank	Rider	Team	Time
1	José Manuel Fuente (ESP)	Kas–Kaskol	36h 36' 47"
2	Donato Giuliani (ITA)	Filotex	+ 4' 45"
3	Wladimiro Panizza (ITA)	GBC–Sony	+ 5' 25"
4	Francisco Galdós (ESP)	Kas–Kaskol	+ 6' 14"
5	Enrico Paolini (ITA)	Scic	+ 6' 31"
6	Silvano Schiavon (ITA)	Magniflex	+ 7' 50"
7	Gösta Pettersson (SWE)	Scic	+ 7' 53"
8	Fabrizio Fabbri (ITA)	Magniflex	+ 8' 58"
9	Lino Farisato (ITA)	Scic	+ 10' 05"
10	Luciano Conati (ITA)	Scic	+ 11' 52"
