= Pedro Lópes =

Portuguese cyclist

Personal information
- Full name: Pedro Miguel Gonçalves Lopes
- Born: 29 June 1975 (age 51) Santo Estêvão, Portugal

Cycling career
- Sport: Cycling
- Discipline: Road
- Role: Rider

Professional teams
- 1996: Recer–Boavista
- 1997: Progecer–Tavira
- 1998–2006: LA Alumínios–Pecol
- 2007–2008: Benfica
- 2009–2010: LA Alumínios–Rota dos Móveis

Pedro Miguel Gonçalves Lópes (born 29 June 1975) is a Portuguese former professional road cyclist. He competed in the men's individual road race at the 1996 Summer Olympics. He also competed in the 2000 Vuelta a España.

== Major results ==
1995
2nd Overall GP Costa Azul

1st Stage 2

1998
1st Stage 2 Volta a Portugal
3rd Road race, National Road Championships
8th Overall Giro di Puglia
2001
3rd Time trial, National Road Championships
8th Overall Volta ao Alentejo
2002
1st Stage 5 Vuelta Asturias
1st Stage 1 Troféu Joaquim Agostinho
2004
2nd Overall Gran Premio Internacional Mitsubishi MR Cortez
6th Overall Volta ao Algarve
9th Klasika Primavera
2005
4th Overall Volta ao Algarve
2006
4th Overall GP Costa Azul
2009
7th Overall Tour du Maroc
