= Wilfried Reybrouck =

Belgian cyclist

Personal information
- Born: 27 January 1953 (age 73) Bruges, Belgium

Cycling career
- Sport: Cycling
- Current team: Retired
- Discipline: Road
- Role: Rider

Professional teams
- 1974: Filcas
- 1975: Frisol–CBG
- 1976: Ebo–Cinzia
- 1977: Bianchi–Campagnolo
- 1978: Bode Deuren–Shimano
- 1979: Lano–Boule d'Or

Wilfried Reybrouck (born 27 January 1953 in Bruges) is a former Belgian cyclist. He is the brother of Guido Reybrouck and the nephew of Gustave Danneels, both former cyclists.

In 1974, as his first year as a professional, Reybrouck attacked on the first stage of the Giro d'Italia with 400 meters to go and won the stage.

== Major results ==
1974
1st Stage 1 Giro d'Italia
1975
1st Stage 3 Ronde van Nederland
1st Overall Grande Prémio Jornal de Notícias
2nd De Kustpijl
2nd Trofeo Luis Puig
1977
5th Omloop van de Vlaamse Scheldeboorden
1979
10th Omloop van de Vlaamse Scheldeboorden
