= Grande Prémio Internacional Costa Azul =

Race details
- Date: February
- Region: Portugal
- Discipline: Road
- Competition: UCI Europe Tour
- Type: Stage race

History
- First edition: 1986
- Editions: 9
- Final edition: 2006

Grande Prémio Internacional Costa Azul was a stage cycling race held annually in Portugal. It was part of UCI Europe Tour in category 2.1 from 2005 to 2006.

== Winners ==
Year	Winner	Second	Third
1986	(Portugal) Manuel Zeferino		
1987–1988	No race		
1989	(United Kingdom) Cayn-Jack Theakston	(Portugal) Eduardo Manuel Correia	(Portugal) José Antonio Xavier Guimaraes
1990			
1991	(Portugal) Carlos Alberto Carneiro		
1992	(Portugal) Joaquim Alberto Salgado		
1993	(Portugal) Luis Jorge Sequeira	(Portugal) Paulo Manuel Couto	(Poland) Andrzej Dulas
1994	No race		
1995	(Portugal) Joaquim Alberto Salgado	(Portugal) Pedro Miguel Lopes	(Portugal) José Agostinho Rosa
1996	(Portugal) José Azevedo		
1997–2004	No race		
2005	(Spain) Rubén Plaza	(Austria) Bernhard Eisel	(Italy) Enrico Degano
2006	(Australia) Robbie McEwen	(Austria) Bernhard Eisel	(Italy) Giosuè Bonomi
