= Venceslau Fernandes =

Portuguese cyclist (born 1945)

Personal information
- Full name: Venceslau Domingues Fernande
- Born: 22 April 1945 (age 81) Perosinho, Portugal

Cycling career
- Sport: Cycling
- Current team: Retired
- Discipline: Road
- Role: Rider

Professional teams
- 1966: Cedemi
- 1970: Ambar
- 1971: Sangalhos–S.I.S.–Sachs
- 1971: Möbel Märki-Bonanza
- 1972–1975: Sport Lisboa e Benfica–Mercury Turismo
- 1984–1987: Ajacto–Morphy Richards
- 1988: Recer–Sangalhos
- 1989: Grundfos–Sangalhos
- 1990: Alguerra–Componauto
- 1991: Quintanilha–Pacos de Felgueiras

Venceslau Domingues Fernandes (born 22 April 1945) is a Portuguese former professional road cyclist. He is the father of triathlete Vanessa Fernandes and professional cyclist Venceslau Fernandes Jr. Professional from 1966 to 1991, he competed in three editions of the Vuelta a España, with his best finish being 21st in 1973. He also placed second on stage 15 of the 1974 edition. He also won several stage races, including the 1984 Volta a Portugal and the 1981 Troféu Joaquim Agostinho.

== Major results ==
1972
1st Stage 2b Volta a Portugal
8th Overall Vuelta a Cantabria
1973
6th Overall Vuelta a Aragón
6th Overall Volta a Portugal
1974
9th Overall Volta a Portugal

1st Prologue (TTT)

1976
1st Overall Rapport Toer
1st Porto–Lisboa
7th Overall Vuelta a Aragón
9th Overall Volta a Portugal
1977
8th Overall Volta a Portugal
1979
9th Overall Volta a Portugal

1st Stage 3b

9th Overall Grande Prémio Jornal de Notícias
1980
1st Overall Grande Prémio Jornal de Notícias
7th Overall Volta a Portugal

1st Prologue (TTT)

7th Overall Volta ao Algarve
1981
1st Overall Troféu Joaquim Agostinho
1st Stage 8 Volta a Portugal
1st Stage 2a Grande Prémio Jornal de Notícias
1983
1st Stage 2 Troféu Joaquim Agostinho
4th Overall Volta a Portugal

1st Stage 12

1984
1st Overall Volta a Portugal
3rd Road race, National Road Championships
1985
3rd Overall Volta a Portugal

1st Stage 6b

1987
2nd Overall Grande Prémio Jornal de Notícias
9th Overall Volta a Portugal
1988
1st Stage 2 Volta a Portugal
1989
1st Stage 4 Grande Prémio Jornal de Notícias
