= Los Ángeles de San Rafael =

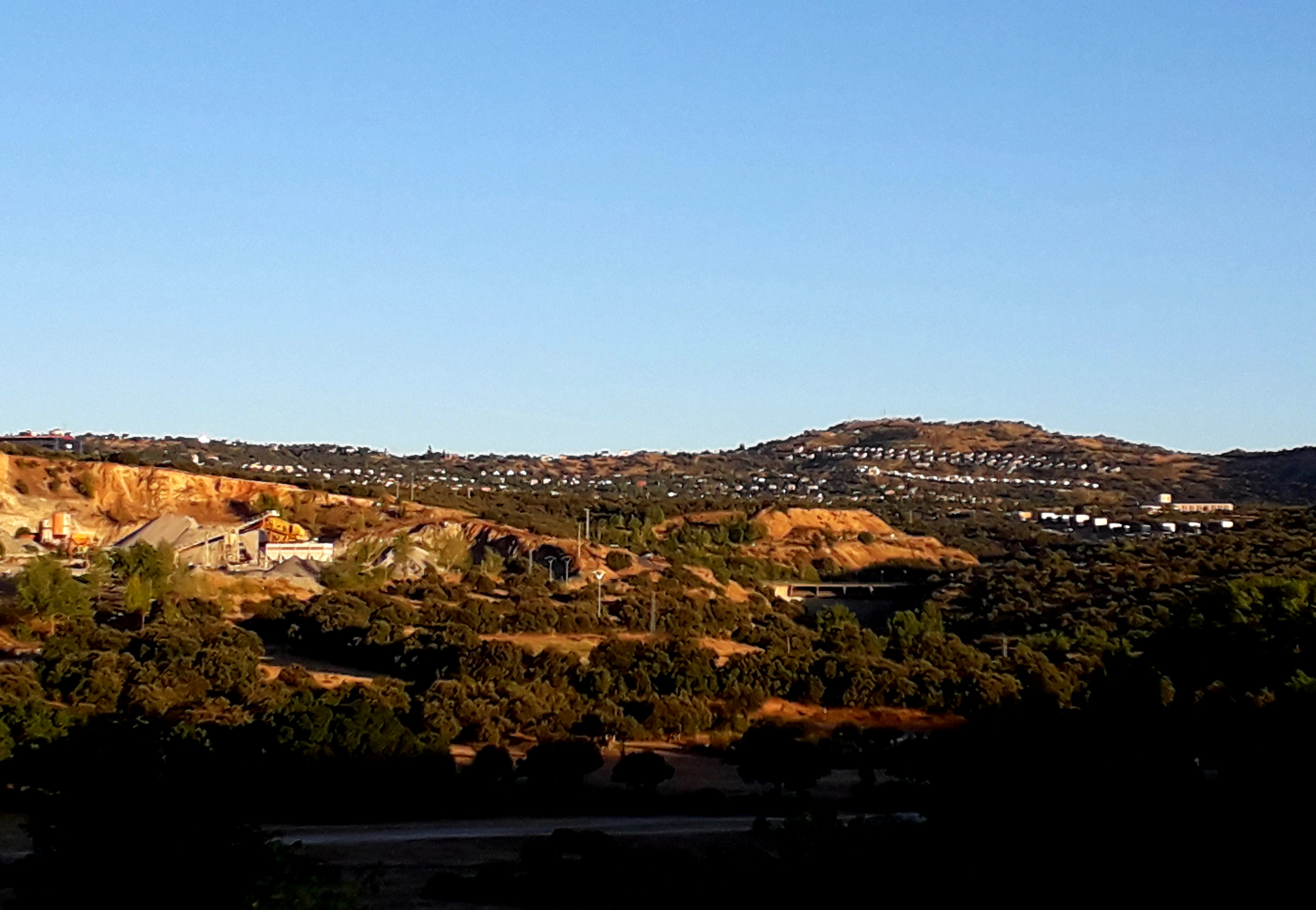
- Los Ángeles de San Rafael from Vegas de Matute
- Interactive map of Los Ángeles de San Rafael
- Coordinates: 40.77577°N 4.20889°W
- Country: Spain
- Region: Castile and Leon
- Province: Province of Segovia
- Established: 1967
- Demonym: Angeleños/as
- Time zone: UTC+1 (CET)
  - Summer (DST): UTC+2 (CEST)
- Postal code: 40423 and 40424

Los Ángeles de San Rafael is one of the four population centres of the municipality of El Espinar, in Spain. Although it is located 68 km away northwest of the city of Madrid, it belongs to the province of Segovia and to the autonomous community of Castile and Leon.

== Geography ==
It lies in the western slope of both the mountain Cerro El Carlocho and the El Portachuelo hill. The river Moros passes through the western limit and there is a dam just near the Nayade area. Of the four population centres, it is the furthest one regarding to the municipal headquarters of El Espinar.

== History ==
His history started in the 1967 when the businessman Jesús Gil started the residential community. Before that year, the whole area was a country property named as Finca El Carrascal. Unfortunately, on 15 June 1967 an under construction building collapse suddenly killing 58 and injuring 150. Over the years, the area expanded westward. In fact, most of the urban layout forms an urban expansion with long streets that are aligned to the main avenue that runs from the entrance to the western limit near the dam.

== See also ==
List of municipalities in Castile and León
