= Eduardo Correia =

Portuguese cyclist

Personal information
- Born: 21 February 1961 (age 65)

Cycling career
- Sport: Cycling
- Role: Rider

Eduardo Correia (born 21 February 1961) is a Portuguese racing cyclist. He rode in the 1984 Tour de France.
