= André Mollet (cyclist) =

French cyclist (born 1949)

Personal information
- Born: 13 July 1949 (age 77)

Cycling career
- Sport: Cycling
- Role: Rider

André Mollet (born 13 July 1949) is a French racing cyclist. He rode in the 1973 Tour de France.
