= José Casas (cyclist) =

Spanish cyclist (born 1945)

Personal information
- Full name: José Casas García
- Born: 21 March 1945 (age 81)

Cycling career
- Sport: Cycling
- Role: Rider

José Casas García (born 21 March 1945) is a Spanish former racing cyclist. He rode in the 1971 Tour de France.
