= Jan Van De Wiele =

Belgian cyclist

Personal information
- Born: 3 November 1948 (age 77)

Cycling career
- Sport: Cycling
- Role: Rider

Jan Van De Wiele (born 3 November 1948) is a Belgian racing cyclist. He rode in the 1974 Tour de France.
