= Martin Martinez =

French racing cyclist (1946–2012)

Personal information
- Born: 22 February 1946 Burgos, Spain
- Died: 4 February 2012 (aged 65) Nevers, France

Cycling career
- Sport: Cycling
- Discipline: Road
- Role: Rider

Professional teams
- 1972–1973: Gan–Mercier–Hutchinson
- 1974: Magiglace–Juaneda
- 1975: Gitane–Campagnolo

Major wins
- Grand Tours Vuelta a España 1 individual stage (1974)

Martin Martinez (22 February 1946 – 4 February 2012) was a Spanish-born French racing cyclist, who competed as a professional from 1972 to 1975. The highlight of his career was winning stage 10b of the 1974 Vuelta a España after a 35 kilometer solo breakaway. He was the brother of fellow cyclist Mariano Martínez and the uncle of Yannick Martinez.

== Major results ==
1970
1st Stage 3 Tour Nivernais Morvan
1974
1st Stage 10b Vuelta a España
