= Antonio Vallori =

Spanish cyclist

Personal information
- Born: 21 January 1949 (age 77)

Cycling career
- Sport: Cycling
- Role: Rider

Antonio Vallori (born 21 January 1949) is a Spanish racing cyclist. He rode in the 1974 Tour de France.
