= José Luis Abilleira =

Spanish cyclist

Personal information
- Born: 27 October 1947 (age 78) Madrid, Spain

Cycling career
- Sport: Cycling
- Role: Rider
- Rider type: Climber

Professional teams
- 1969: Pepsi-Cola
- 1970–1974: La Casera–Peña Bahamontes
- 1975: Monteverde–Sanson
- 1976: Teka

Major wins
- Grand Tours Vuelta a España Mountains classification (1973, 1974)

José Luis Abilleira (born 27 October 1947) is a Spanish racing cyclist. He won the mountains classification in the Vuelta a España twice in 1973 and 1974.

== Major results ==
1967
2nd Vuelta a Cantabria
1969
1st Clásica a los Puertos
1971
3rd Overall Vuelta a La Rioja

1st Stage 1

10th Overall Vuelta a Cantabria
1972
2nd Subida a Arrate
2nd Klasika Primavera
2nd GP Pascuas
3rd Grand Prix Navarre
1973
1st Stage 3a Vuelta a Asturias
1st Mountains classification, Vuelta a España
2nd Road race, National Road Championships
2nd Grand Prix Navarre
2nd Klasika Primavera
3rd Overall Vuelta a Levante
7th Subida a Arrate
10th Gran Premio Valencia
10th GP Pascuas
1974
1st Mountains classification, Vuelta a España
2nd Overall Vuelta a Levante
3rd Klasika Primavera
4th GP Pascuas
8th Gran Premio Valencia
10th Overall Tour of the Basque Country
1975
1st Mountains classification, Setmana Catalana de Ciclisme
8th Overall Vuelta a Aragón

1st Mountains classification

1976
4th GP Pascuas
6th Gran Premio Valencia
6th Klasika Primavera

=== Grand Tour general classification results timeline ===
Grand Tour	1969	1970	1971	1972	1973	1974	1975	1976
Vuelta a España	—	—	25	22	15	13	22	DNF
Giro d'Italia	Did not contest during career							
Tour de France	—	—	—	—	DNF	60	—	—

Legend
—	Did not compete
DNF	Did not finish
