= José Manuel Fuente =

Spanish cyclist (1945–1996)

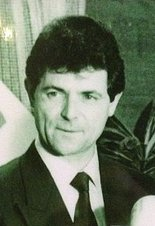

Personal information
- Full name: José-Manuel Fuente Lavandera
- Nickname: El Tarangu
- Born: September 30, 1945 Limanes, Spain
- Died: July 18, 1996 (aged 50) Oviedo, Spain

Cycling career
- Sport: Cycling
- Discipline: Road
- Role: Rider
- Rider type: Climber

Professional teams
- 1970: Karpy Licor
- 1971–1975: Kas-Kaskol
- 1976: Bianchi-Campagnolo

Major wins
- Grand Tours Tour de France 2 individual stages (1971) Giro d'Italia Mountains classification (1971, 1972, 1973, 1974) 9 individual stages (1971, 1972, 1973, 1974) Vuelta a España General classification (1972, 1974) Mountains classification (1972) Combination classification (1972) 3 individual stages (1972, 1974) Stage races Tour de Suisse (1973)

José Manuel Fuente Lavandera (September 30, 1945 – July 18, 1996) was a professional road racing cyclist and noted climbing specialist.

Fuente was a professional from 1970 to 1976. He had the same nickname as his father and grandfather, which was "El Tarangu", a word in the Asturian language for a man reputed for his strength and character. Fuente was known as one of the greatest climbers of his generation. He was a two-time winner of the Vuelta a España and won four consecutive climbers classification (or King of the Mountains) at the Giro d'Italia. He was rivals with the great cyclists of his time: Eddy Merckx and Luis Ocaña. He won the Vuelta a España in 1972, which at that time was held in late April and early May. Several weeks later, in the 1972 Giro d'Italia, Fuente had a great battle with Eddy Merckx. Fuente took the pink jersey as leader of the general classification early on in the race but Merckx took it back. On the mountain stage to Bardonecchia, Fuente put in an attack that put pressure on Merckx. Little by little, Merckx increased his pace and came back to Fuente and ended up winning the stage.

Health problems due to kidney disease forced Fuente to retire in 1975. After retirement he opened a successful cycle business in Oviedo and in 1988 was appointed directeur sportif of the CLAS team. This lasted only a year, after which he was replaced in 1989 by Juan Fernadez. Fuente died following a long battle with kidney disease at the age of 50.

== Major results ==
1969
3rd Vuelta Asturias
1970
1st Stage 9 Volta a Catalunya
3rd Overall Vuelta a los Valles Mineros
1971
Giro d'Italia

1st Mountains classification
1st Stage 10

Tour de France

1st Stages 14 & 15

1972
1st Overall Vuelta a España

1st Mountains classification
1st Combination classification
1st Stage 12

2nd Overall Giro d'Italia

1st Mountains classification
1st Stages 4a & 17
Held after Stages 4a–6

1973
1st Overall Tour de Suisse

1st Mountains classification
1st Stages 4 & 5

2nd Overall Volta a la Comunitat Valenciana
3rd Overall Tour de France

Held after Stages 9–10

8th Overall Giro d'Italia

1st Mountains classification
1st Stage 19

1974
1st Overall Vuelta a España

1st Stages 9 & 13

5th Overall Giro d'Italia

1st Mountains classification
1st Stages 3, 9, 11a, 16 & 20
Held after Stages 3–13

8th Overall Tour of the Basque Country
1976
1st Stage 3a Vuelta a los Valles Mineros

=== Grand Tour general classification results timeline ===
Grand Tour	1970	1971	1972	1973	1974	1975
Vuelta a España	16	54	1	—	1	DNF
Giro d'Italia	—	39	2	8	5	18
Tour de France	—	72	—	3	—	DNF

Legend
—	Did not compete
DNF	Did not finish
