= Juan Zurano =

Spanish cyclist (born 1948)

Personal information
- Full name: Juan Santiago Zurano Jérez
- Born: 1 September 1948 (age 78) Lorca, Murcia, Spanish State

Cycling career
- Sport: Cycling
- Current team: Retired
- Discipline: Road
- Role: Rider

Professional teams
- 1971–1974: La Casera–Peña Bahamontes
- 1975–1976: Kas–Kaskol

Juan Santiago Zurano Jérez (born 1 September 1948) is a Spanish former racing cyclist. He rode in the 1973 Tour de France and won stage 14 of the 1973 Vuelta a España.
