= José Luis Uribezubia =

Spanish cyclist

Personal information
- Full name: José Luis Uribezubia Velar
- Born: 21 August 1945 (age 81) Berriz, Spain

Cycling career
- Sport: Cycling
- Current team: Retired
- Discipline: Road
- Role: Rider

Professional teams
- 1967–1971: Kas–Kaskol
- 1972: Werner
- 1973–1974: Kas–Kaskol
- 1975–1976: Super Ser

José Luis Uribezubia (born 21 August 1945) is a Spanish former racing cyclist. He rode in three editions of the Tour de France, as well as seven editions of the Vuelta a España and three of the Giro d'Italia.

== Major results ==
1967
1st Overall Vuelta a Aragón
1st Clásica a los Puertos de Guadarrama
3rd GP Villafranca de Ordizia
3rd Overall Gran Premio de la Bicicleta Eibarresa
1972
6th Overall Tour of the Basque Country
9th Overall Vuelta a Andalucía
1973
9th Overall Tour of the Basque Country
1974
6th Trofeo Masferrer
8th Overall Vuelta a España

1st Stage 11

1975
1st GP Llodio
7th Klasika Primavera
1976
1st Overall Vuelta a los Valles Mineros

1st Stage 2

9th Overall Paris–Nice
