= List of teams and cyclists in the 1973 Giro d'Italia =

The 1973 Giro d'Italia was the 56th edition of the Giro d'Italia, one of cycling's Grand Tours. The field consisted of 140 riders, and 113 riders finished the race.

== By rider ==
Legend
No.	Starting number worn by the rider during the Giro
Pos.	Position in the general classification
DNF	Denotes a rider who did not finish

No.	Name	Nationality	Team	Ref
1	Eddy Merckx	Belgium	Molteni	
2	Joseph Bruyère	Belgium	Molteni	
3	Jos Deschoenmaecker	Belgium	Molteni	
4	Jos Huysmans	Belgium	Molteni	
5	Edward Janssens	Belgium	Molteni	
6	Frans Mintjens	Belgium	Molteni	
7	Aldo Parecchini	Italy	Molteni	
8	Jozef Spruyt	Belgium	Molteni	
9	Roger Swerts	Belgium	Molteni	
10	Victor Van Schil	Belgium	Molteni	
11	Marino Basso	Italy	Bianchi–Campagnolo	
12	Giovanni Cavalcanti	Italy	Bianchi–Campagnolo	
13	Felice Gimondi	Italy	Bianchi–Campagnolo	
14	Ercole Gualazzini	Italy	Bianchi–Campagnolo	
15	Pietro Guerra	Italy	Bianchi–Campagnolo	
16	Claudio Michelotto	Italy	Bianchi–Campagnolo	
17	Franco Mori	Italy	Bianchi–Campagnolo	
18	Ole Ritter	Denmark	Bianchi–Campagnolo	
19	Martín Rodríguez	Colombia	Bianchi–Campagnolo	
20	Giacinto Santambrogio	Italy	Bianchi–Campagnolo	
21	Roger De Vlaeminck	Belgium	Brooklyn	
22	Fausto Bertoglio	Italy	Brooklyn	
23	Valerio Lualdi	Italy	Brooklyn	
24	Adriano Passuello	Italy	Brooklyn	
25	Arturo Pecchielan	Italy	Brooklyn	
26	Attilio Rota	Italy	Brooklyn	
27	Patrick Sercu	Belgium	Brooklyn	
28	Julien Stevens	Belgium	Brooklyn	
29	Julien Van Lint	Belgium	Brooklyn	
30	Pierfranco Vianelli	Italy	Brooklyn	
31	Italo Zilioli	Italy	Dreherforte	
32	Luciano Borgognoni	Italy	Dreherforte	
33	Giovanni Dalla Bona	Italy	Dreherforte	
34	Giuliano Dominoni	Italy	Dreherforte	
35	Gino Fochesato	Italy	Dreherforte	
36	Mauro Landini	Italy	Dreherforte	
37	Mario Lanzafame	Italy	Dreherforte	
38	Enrico Maggioni	Italy	Dreherforte	
39	Franco Ongarato	Italy	Dreherforte	
40	Tullio Rossi	Italy	Dreherforte	
41	Emanuele Bergamo	Italy	Filotex	
42	Marcello Bergamo	Italy	Filotex	
43	Arnaldo Caverzasi	Italy	Filotex	
44	Ugo Colombo	Italy	Filotex	
45	Josef Fuchs	Switzerland	Filotex	
46	Donato Giuliani	Italy	Filotex	
47	Renato Marchetti	Italy	Filotex	
48	Aldo Moser	Italy	Filotex	
49	Gabriele Mugnaini	Italy	Filotex	
50	Francesco Moser	Italy	Filotex	
51	André Dierickx	Belgium	Flandria–Carpenter–Shimano	
52	Johan De Muynck	Belgium	Flandria–Carpenter–Shimano	
53	Gérard David	Belgium	Flandria–Carpenter–Shimano	
54	Maurice Dury	Belgium	Flandria–Carpenter–Shimano	
55	Eric Wijckaert	Belgium	Flandria–Carpenter–Shimano	
56	Jean-Luc Molinéris	France	Flandria–Carpenter–Shimano	
57	Francis Ducreux	France	Flandria–Carpenter–Shimano	
58	Daniel Ducreux	France	Flandria–Carpenter–Shimano	
59	François Coquery	France	Flandria–Carpenter–Shimano	
60	Roger Legeay	France	Flandria–Carpenter–Shimano	
61	Mario Anni	Italy	G.B.C.–Sony	
62	Carlo Brunetti	Italy	G.B.C.–Sony	
63	Ezio Cardi	Italy	G.B.C.–Sony	
64	Wilmo Francioni	Italy	G.B.C.–Sony	
65	Giorgio Morbiato	Italy	G.B.C.–Sony	
66	Wladimiro Panizza	Italy	G.B.C.–Sony	
67	Alessio Peccolo	Italy	G.B.C.–Sony	
68	Silvano Ravagli	Italy	G.B.C.–Sony	
69	Roberto Sorlini	Italy	G.B.C.–Sony	
70	Fritz Wehrli	Switzerland	G.B.C.–Sony	
71	Alessio Antonini	Italy	Jollj Ceramica	
72	Giovanni Battaglin	Italy	Jollj Ceramica	
73	Giacomo Bazzan	Italy	Jollj Ceramica	
74	Enzo Brentegani	Italy	Jollj Ceramica	
75	Bruno Buffa	Italy	Jollj Ceramica	
76	Marino Conton	Italy	Jollj Ceramica	
77	Pierino Gavazzi	Italy	Jollj Ceramica	
78	Ueli Sutter	Switzerland	Jollj Ceramica	
79	Romano Tumellero	Italy	Jollj Ceramica	
80	Pietro Gambarrotto	Italy	Jollj Ceramica	
81	Gonzalo Aja	Spain	Kas–Kaskol	
82	José Manuel Fuente	Spain	Kas–Kaskol	
83	Francisco Galdós	Spain	Kas–Kaskol	
84	José Grande	Spain	Kas–Kaskol	
85	Nemesio Jiménez	Spain	Kas–Kaskol	
86	Santiago Lazcano	Spain	Kas–Kaskol	
87	Domingo Perurena	Spain	Kas–Kaskol	
88	José Pesarrodona	Spain	Kas–Kaskol	
89	José Luis Uribezubia	Spain	Kas–Kaskol	
90	Luis Zubero	Spain	Kas–Kaskol	
91	Davide Boifava	Italy	Magniflex	
92	Fabrizio Fabbri	Italy	Magniflex	
93	Pietro Campagnari	Italy	Magniflex	
94	Sandro Quintarelli	Italy	Magniflex	
95	Giorgio Favaro	Italy	Magniflex	
96	Pietro Dallai	Italy	Magniflex	
97	Silvano Schiavon	Italy	Magniflex	
98	Mauro Vannucchi	Italy	Magniflex	
99	Gaetano Juliano	Italy	Magniflex	
100	Vittorio Urbani	Italy	Magniflex	
101	Gerben Karstens	Netherlands	Rokado–De Gribaldy	
102	Rik Van Linden	Belgium	Rokado–De Gribaldy	
103	Gustav Van Roosbroeck	Belgium	Rokado–De Gribaldy	
104	Albert Van Vlierberghe	Belgium	Rokado–De Gribaldy	
105	Jan Vandewiele	Belgium	Rokado–De Gribaldy	
106	Gustav Hermans	Belgium	Rokado–De Gribaldy	
107	Hennie Kuiper	Netherlands	Rokado–De Gribaldy	
108	Karl-Heinz Muddemann	West Germany	Rokado–De Gribaldy	
109	Karl-Heinz Küster	West Germany	Rokado–De Gribaldy	
110	Roger Gilson	Luxembourg	Rokado–De Gribaldy	
111	Franco Bitossi	Italy	Sammontana	
112	Pietro Di Caterina	Italy	Sammontana	
113	Sigfrido Fontanelli	Italy	Sammontana	
114	Renato Laghi	Italy	Sammontana	
115	Primo Mori	Italy	Sammontana	
116	Marcello Osler	Italy	Sammontana	
117	Roberto Poggiali	Italy	Sammontana	
118	Walter Riccomi	Italy	Sammontana	
119	Mauro Simonetti	Italy	Sammontana	
120	Piero Spinelli	Italy	Sammontana	
121	Michele Dancelli	Italy	Scic	
122	Enrico Paolini	Italy	Scic	
123	Giancarlo Polidori	Italy	Scic	
124	Lino Farisato	Italy	Scic	
125	Guerrino Tosello	Italy	Scic	
126	Attilio Benfatto	Italy	Scic	
127	Gösta Pettersson	Sweden	Scic	
128	Celestino Vercelli	Italy	Scic	
129	Angelo Bassini	Italy	Scic	
130	Luciano Conati	Italy	Scic	
131	Gianni Motta	Italy	Zonca	
132	Walter Avogadri	Italy	Zonca	
133	Claudio Bonacina	Italy	Zonca	
134	Costantino Conti	Italy	Zonca	
135	Ottavio Crepaldi	Italy	Zonca	
136	Adriano Pella	Italy	Zonca	
137	Giuseppe Perletto	Italy	Zonca	
138	Giovanni Varini	Italy	Zonca	
139	Louis Pfenninger	Switzerland	Zonca	
140	Enrico Guadrini	Italy	Zonca	
