= List of teams and cyclists in the 1974 Giro d'Italia =

The 1974 Giro d'Italia was the 57th edition of the Giro d'Italia, one of cycling's Grand Tours. The field consisted of 140 riders, and 96 riders finished the race.

== By rider ==
Legend
No.	Starting number worn by the rider during the Giro
Pos.	Position in the general classification
DNF	Denotes a rider who did not finish

No.	Name	Nationality	Team	Ref
1	Eddy Merckx	Belgium	Molteni	
2	Joseph Bruyère	Belgium	Molteni	
3	Jos Deschoenmaecker	Belgium	Molteni	
4	Ludo Delcroix	Belgium	Molteni	
5	Jos Huysmans	Belgium	Molteni	
6	Edward Janssens	Belgium	Molteni	
7	Frans Mintjens	Belgium	Molteni	
8	Karel Rottiers	Belgium	Molteni	
9	Victor Van Schil	Belgium	Molteni	
10	Albert Van Vlierberghe	Belgium	Molteni	
11	Felice Gimondi	Italy	Bianchi–Campagnolo	
12	Marino Basso	Italy	Bianchi–Campagnolo	
13	Giovanni Cavalcanti	Italy	Bianchi–Campagnolo	
14	Antoine Houbrechts	Belgium	Bianchi–Campagnolo	
15	Martín Emilio Rodríguez	Colombia	Bianchi–Campagnolo	
16	Giacinto Santambrogio	Italy	Bianchi–Campagnolo	
17	Luigi Castelletti	Italy	Bianchi–Campagnolo	
18	Gianfranco Foresti	Italy	Bianchi–Campagnolo	
19	Serge Parsani	Italy	Bianchi–Campagnolo	
20	Pietro Guerra	Italy	Bianchi–Campagnolo	
21	Roger De Vlaeminck	Belgium	Brooklyn	
22	Giancarlo Bellini	Italy	Brooklyn	
23	Johan De Muynck	Belgium	Brooklyn	
24	Ercole Gualazzini	Italy	Brooklyn	
25	Wladimiro Panizza	Italy	Brooklyn	
26	Adriano Passuello	Italy	Brooklyn	
27	Attilio Rota	Italy	Brooklyn	
28	Patrick Sercu	Belgium	Brooklyn	
29	Julien Van Lint	Belgium	Brooklyn	
30	Herman Van der Slagmolen	Belgium	Brooklyn	
31	Luciano Borgognoni	Italy	Dreherforte	
32	Pietro Campagnari	Italy	Dreherforte	
33	Giovanni Dalla Bona	Italy	Dreherforte	
34	Gino Fochesato	Italy	Dreherforte	
35	Mauro Landini	Italy	Dreherforte	
36	Mario Lanzafame	Italy	Dreherforte	
37	Enrico Maggioni	Italy	Dreherforte	
38	Giancarlo Polidori	Italy	Dreherforte	
39	Tullio Rossi	Italy	Dreherforte	
40	Italo Zilioli	Italy	Dreherforte	
41	Attilio Benfatto	Italy	Filcas	
42	Claudio Bortolotto	Italy	Filcas	
43	Efrem Dall'anese	Italy	Filcas	
44	Wilfried Reybrouck	Belgium	Filcas	
45	Simone Fraccaro	Italy	Filcas	
46	Adriano Durante	Italy	Filcas	
47	Alessio Peccolo	Italy	Filcas	
48	Luciano Rossignoli	Italy	Filcas	
49	Luigi Venturato	Italy	Filcas	
50	Erik Serlet	Belgium	Filcas	
51	Francesco Moser	Italy	Filotex	
52	Emanuele Bergamo	Italy	Filotex	
53	Marcello Bergamo	Italy	Filotex	
54	Arnaldo Caverzasi	Italy	Filotex	
55	Ugo Colombo	Italy	Filotex	
56	Donato Giuliani	Italy	Filotex	
57	Josef Fuchs	Switzerland	Filotex	
58	Roberto Poggiali	Italy	Filotex	
59	Ole Ritter	Denmark	Filotex	
60	Roberto Sorlini	Italy	Filotex	
61	Carlo Brunetti	Italy	Furzi	
62	Giovanni Varini	Italy	Furzi	
63	Umberto Moretti	Italy	Furzi	
64	Luigi Scorza	Italy	Furzi	
65	Giancarlo Tartoni	Italy	Furzi	
66	Silvano Ravagli	Italy	Furzi	
67	René Olsen	Denmark	Furzi	
68	Albert Zweifel	Switzerland	Furzi	
69	Guerrino Tosello	Italy	Furzi	
70	Agustín Tamames	Spain	Furzi	
71	Alessio Antonini	Italy	Jollj Ceramica	
72	Giovanni Battaglin	Italy	Jollj Ceramica	
73	Giacomo Bazzan	Italy	Jollj Ceramica	
74	Enzo Brentegani	Italy	Jollj Ceramica	
75	Pierino Gavazzi	Italy	Jollj Ceramica	
76	Knut Knudsen	Norway	Jollj Ceramica	
77	Rafael Nino	Colombia	Jollj Ceramica	
78	Ueli Sutter	Switzerland	Jollj Ceramica	
79	Dorino Vanzo	Italy	Jollj Ceramica	
80	Bruno Vicino	Italy	Jollj Ceramica	
81	José Manuel Fuente	Spain	Kas–Kaskol	
82	José Antonio González	Spain	Kas–Kaskol	
83	José Luis Uribezubia	Spain	Kas–Kaskol	
84	Santiago Lazcano	Spain	Kas–Kaskol	
85	Vicente López Carril	Spain	Kas–Kaskol	
86	Francisco Galdós	Spain	Kas–Kaskol	
87	Antonio Martos	Spain	Kas–Kaskol	
88	José Grande	Spain	Kas–Kaskol	
89	Luis Zubero	Spain	Kas–Kaskol	
90	Gonzalo Aja	Spain	Kas–Kaskol	
91	Gösta Pettersson	Sweden	Magniflex	
92	Gianni Motta	Italy	Magniflex	
93	Mario Branchi	Italy	Magniflex	
94	Silvano Schiavon	Italy	Magniflex	
95	Ottavio Crepaldi	Italy	Magniflex	
96	Gaetano Juliano	Italy	Magniflex	
97	Sandro Quintarelli	Italy	Magniflex	
98	Alfredo Chinetti	Italy	Magniflex	
99	Daniele Mazziero	Italy	Magniflex	
100	Bruce Biddle	New Zealand	Magniflex	
101	Willy De Geest	Belgium	Rokado	
102	Alfred Gaida	West Germany	Rokado	
103	Roger Gilson	Luxembourg	Rokado	
104	Günter Haritz	West Germany	Rokado	
105	Wolfgang Hellwig	West Germany	Rokado	
106	Gustave Hermans	Belgium	Rokado	
107	Karl-Heinz Küster	West Germany	Rokado	
108	Hennie Kuiper	Netherlands	Rokado	
109	Karl Muddemann	West Germany	Rokado	
110	Johan Ruch	West Germany	Rokado	
111	Pietro Di Caterina	Italy	Sammontana	
112	Fabrizio Fabbri	Italy	Sammontana	
113	Sigfrido Fontanelli	Italy	Sammontana	
114	Wilmo Francioni	Italy	Sammontana	
115	Primo Mori	Italy	Sammontana	
116	Marcello Osler	Italy	Sammontana	
117	Giuseppe Perletto	Italy	Sammontana	
118	Walter Riccomi	Italy	Sammontana	
119	Antonio Salutini	Italy	Sammontana	
120	Mauro Simonetti	Italy	Sammontana	
121	Gaetano Baronchelli	Italy	Scic	
122	Gianbattista Baronchelli	Italy	Scic	
123	Franco Bitossi	Italy	Scic	
134	Luciano Conati	Italy	Scic	
135	Giovanni Martella	Italy	Scic	
136	Renato Laghi	Italy	Scic	
127	Enrico Paolini	Italy	Scic	
128	Bruno Zanoni	Italy	Scic	
129	Piero Spinelli	Italy	Scic	
130	Celestino Vercelli	Italy	Scic	
131	Walter Avogadri	Italy	Zonca	
132	Claudio Bonacina	Italy	Zonca	
133	Constantino Conti	Italy	Zonca	
134	Giorgio Favaro	Italy	Zonca	
135	Enrico Guadrini	Italy	Zonca	
136	Louis Pfenninger	Switzerland	Zonca	
137	Adriano Pella	Italy	Zonca	
138	Roland Salm	Switzerland	Zonca	
139	René Savary	Switzerland	Zonca	
140	Erich Spahn	Switzerland	Zonca	
