= 1973 Giro d'Italia, Stage 11 to Stage 20 =

Cycling race stages

The 1973 Giro d'Italia was the 56th edition of the Giro d'Italia, one of cycling's Grand Tours. The Giro began with a prologue two-man team time trial in Verviers on 18 May, and Stage 11 occurred on 30 May with a stage from Lanciano. The race finished in Trieste on 9 June.

== Stage 11 ==
30 May 1973 — Lanciano to Benevento, 230 km (140 mi)

Stage 11 result

Rank	Rider	Team	Time
1	Roger De Vlaeminck (BEL)	Brooklyn	6h 58' 14"
2	Felice Gimondi (ITA)	Bianchi–Campagnolo	s.t.
3	Eddy Merckx (BEL)	Molteni	s.t.
4	Gianni Motta (ITA)	Zonca	s.t.
5	Gösta Pettersson (SWE)	Scic	s.t.
6	José Pesarrodona (ESP)	Kas–Kaskol	s.t.
7	Santiago Lazcano (ESP)	Kas–Kaskol	+ 5"
8	José Manuel Fuente (ESP)	Kas–Kaskol	+ 10"
9	Roger Swerts (BEL)	Molteni	s.t.
10	Jos Huysmans (BEL)	Molteni	+ 28"

General classification after Stage 11

Rank	Rider	Team	Time
1	Eddy Merckx (BEL)	Molteni	59h 25' 17"
2	Giovanni Battaglin (ITA)	Jollj Ceramica	+ 6' 39"
3	Felice Gimondi (ITA)	Bianchi–Campagnolo	+ 7' 27"
4	Gianni Motta (ITA)	Zonca	+ 7' 56"
5	Wladimiro Panizza (ITA)	G.B.C.–Sony	+ 8' 23"
6	José Pesarrodona (ESP)	Kas–Kaskol	+ 9' 08"
7	Santiago Lazcano (ESP)	Kas–Kaskol	+ 9' 33"
8	Franco Bitossi (ITA)	Sammontana	+ 9' 48"
9	Roger De Vlaeminck (BEL)	Brooklyn	+ 12' 30"
10	Roberto Poggiali (ITA)	Sammontana	+ 12' 32"

== Stage 12 ==
31 May 1973 — Benevento to Fiuggi, 236 km (147 mi)

Stage 12 result

Rank	Rider	Team	Time
1	Tullio Rossi (ITA)	Dreherforte	6h 55' 00"
2	Mario Anni (ITA)	G.B.C.–Sony	s.t.
3	Roger Gilson (LUX)	Rokado–De Gribaldy	+ 1"
4	Frans Mintjens (BEL)	Molteni	+ 2"
5	Lino Farisato (ITA)	Scic	s.t.
6	Renato Marchetti (ITA)	Filotex	s.t.
7	Joseph Bruyère (BEL)	Molteni	s.t.
8	Davide Boifava (ITA)	Magniflex	+ 9"
9	Roger De Vlaeminck (BEL)	Brooklyn	+ 10' 15"
10	Italo Zilioli (ITA)	Dreherforte	s.t.

General classification after Stage 12

Rank	Rider	Team	Time
1	Eddy Merckx (BEL)	Molteni	66h 31' 32"
2	Giovanni Battaglin (ITA)	Jollj Ceramica	+ 6' 39"
3	Felice Gimondi (ITA)	Bianchi–Campagnolo	+ 7' 27"
4	Gianni Motta (ITA)	Zonca	+ 7' 56"
5	Wladimiro Panizza (ITA)	G.B.C.–Sony	+ 8' 23"
6	José Pesarrodona (ESP)	Kas–Kaskol	+ 9' 08"
7	Santiago Lazcano (ESP)	Kas–Kaskol	+ 9' 33"
8	Franco Bitossi (ITA)	Sammontana	+ 9' 48"
9	Roger De Vlaeminck (BEL)	Brooklyn	+ 12' 30"
10	Roberto Poggiali (ITA)	Sammontana	+ 12' 32"

== Stage 13 ==
1 June 1973 — Fiuggi to Bolsena, 215 km (134 mi)

Stage 13 result

Rank	Rider	Team	Time
1	Roger De Vlaeminck (BEL)	Brooklyn	5h 44' 24"
2	Ole Ritter (DEN)	Bianchi–Campagnolo	s.t.
3	Franco Bitossi (ITA)	Sammontana	s.t.
4	Felice Gimondi (ITA)	Bianchi–Campagnolo	s.t.
5	Santiago Lazcano (ESP)	Kas–Kaskol	s.t.
6	Hennie Kuiper (NED)	Rokado–De Gribaldy	s.t.
7	Giovanni Battaglin (ITA)	Jollj Ceramica	s.t.
8	Francisco Galdós (ESP)	Kas–Kaskol	s.t.
9	José Manuel Fuente (ESP)	Kas–Kaskol	s.t.
10	Wladimiro Panizza (ITA)	G.B.C.–Sony	s.t.

General classification after Stage 13

Rank	Rider	Team	Time
1	Eddy Merckx (BEL)	Molteni	72h 14' 56"
2	Giovanni Battaglin (ITA)	Jollj Ceramica	+ 6' 39"
3	Felice Gimondi (ITA)	Bianchi–Campagnolo	+ 7' 27"
4	Wladimiro Panizza (ITA)	G.B.C.–Sony	+ 8' 23"
5	José Pesarrodona (ESP)	Kas–Kaskol	+ 9' 08"
6	Santiago Lazcano (ESP)	Kas–Kaskol	+ 9' 33"
7	Franco Bitossi (ITA)	Sammontana	+ 9' 48"
8	Roger De Vlaeminck (BEL)	Brooklyn	+ 12' 30"
9	Gösta Pettersson (SWE)	Scic	+ 14' 04"
10	Gianni Motta (ITA)	Zonca	+ 14' 06"

== Stage 14 ==
2 June 1973 — Bolsena to Florence, 202 km (126 mi)

Stage 14 result

Rank	Rider	Team	Time
1	Francesco Moser (ITA)	Filotex	5h 39' 35"
2	Roberto Poggiali (ITA)	Sammontana	s.t.
3	José Manuel Fuente (ESP)	Kas–Kaskol	+ 1"
4	Luis Zubero (ESP)	Kas–Kaskol	+ 2"
5	Silvano Schiavon (ITA)	Magniflex	+ 31"
6	Giovanni Cavalcanti (ITA)	Bianchi–Campagnolo	s.t.
7	Roger De Vlaeminck (BEL)	Brooklyn	+ 1' 15"
8	Gerben Karstens (NED)	Rokado–De Gribaldy	s.t.
9	Marino Basso (ITA)	Bianchi–Campagnolo	s.t.
10	Adriano Pella (ITA)	Zonca	s.t.

General classification after Stage 14

Rank	Rider	Team	Time
1	Eddy Merckx (BEL)	Molteni	77h 55' 46"
2	Giovanni Battaglin (ITA)	Jollj Ceramica	+ 6' 39"
3	Felice Gimondi (ITA)	Bianchi–Campagnolo	+ 7' 27"
4	Wladimiro Panizza (ITA)	G.B.C.–Sony	+ 8' 23"
5	José Pesarrodona (ESP)	Kas–Kaskol	+ 9' 08"
6	Santiago Lazcano (ESP)	Kas–Kaskol	+ 9' 33"
7	Franco Bitossi (ITA)	Sammontana	+ 9' 48"
8	Roger De Vlaeminck (BEL)	Brooklyn	+ 12' 30"
9	Gösta Pettersson (SWE)	Scic	+ 14' 04"
10	Gianni Motta (ITA)	Zonca	+ 14' 06"

== Stage 15 ==
3 June 1973 — Florence to Forte dei Marmi, 150 km (93 mi)

Stage 15 result

Rank	Rider	Team	Time
1	Martín Rodríguez (COL)	Bianchi–Campagnolo	3h 41' 12"
2	Marino Basso (ITA)	Bianchi–Campagnolo	+ 3"
3	Roger De Vlaeminck (BEL)	Brooklyn	s.t.
4	Patrick Sercu (BEL)	Brooklyn	s.t.
5	Rik Van Linden (BEL)	Rokado–De Gribaldy	s.t.
6	Eddy Merckx (BEL)	Molteni	s.t.
7	Pierino Gavazzi (ITA)	Jollj Ceramica	s.t.
8	Gianni Motta (ITA)	Zonca	s.t.
9	Davide Boifava (ITA)	Magniflex	s.t.
10	Gerben Karstens (NED)	Rokado–De Gribaldy	s.t.

General classification after Stage 15

Rank	Rider	Team	Time
1	Eddy Merckx (BEL)	Molteni	81h 37' 01"
2	Giovanni Battaglin (ITA)	Jollj Ceramica	+ 6' 39"
3	Felice Gimondi (ITA)	Bianchi–Campagnolo	+ 7' 27"
4	Wladimiro Panizza (ITA)	G.B.C.–Sony	+ 8' 23"
5	José Pesarrodona (ESP)	Kas–Kaskol	+ 9' 08"
6	Santiago Lazcano (ESP)	Kas–Kaskol	+ 9' 33"
7	Franco Bitossi (ITA)	Sammontana	+ 9' 48"
8	Roger De Vlaeminck (BEL)	Brooklyn	+ 12' 30"
9	Gösta Pettersson (SWE)	Scic	+ 14' 04"
10	Gianni Motta (ITA)	Zonca	+ 14' 06"

== Rest day ==
4 June 1973

== Stage 16 ==
5 June 1973 — Forte dei Marmi to Forte dei Marmi, 37 km (23 mi) (ITT)

Stage 16 result

Rank	Rider	Team	Time
1	Felice Gimondi (ITA)	Bianchi–Campagnolo	46' 23"
2	Ole Ritter (DEN)	Bianchi–Campagnolo	+ 23"
3	Eddy Merckx (BEL)	Molteni	+ 31"
4	Roger Swerts (BEL)	Molteni	+ 1' 15"
5	Gösta Pettersson (SWE)	Scic	+ 1' 20"
6	Roger De Vlaeminck (BEL)	Brooklyn	+ 1' 22"
7	Julien Stevens (BEL)	Brooklyn	+ 1' 32"
8	Francesco Moser (ITA)	Filotex	+ 1' 44"
9	Luciano Borgognoni (ITA)	Dreherforte	+ 1' 57"
10	José Pesarrodona (ESP)	Kas–Kaskol	+ 2' 40"

General classification after Stage 16

Rank	Rider	Team	Time
1	Eddy Merckx (BEL)	Molteni	82h 23' 55"
2	Felice Gimondi (ITA)	Bianchi–Campagnolo	+ 6' 56"
3	Giovanni Battaglin (ITA)	Jollj Ceramica	+ 9' 34"
4	Wladimiro Panizza (ITA)	G.B.C.–Sony	+ 11' 06"
5	José Pesarrodona (ESP)	Kas–Kaskol	+ 11' 17"
6	Franco Bitossi (ITA)	Sammontana	+ 12' 03"
7	Roger De Vlaeminck (BEL)	Brooklyn	+ 13' 21"
8	Santiago Lazcano (ESP)	Kas–Kaskol	+ 13' 51"
9	Gösta Pettersson (SWE)	Scic	+ 14' 53"
10	Gianni Motta (ITA)	Zonca	+ 16' 15"

== Stage 17 ==
6 June 1973 — Forte dei Marmi to Verona, 244 km (152 mi)

Stage 17 result

Rank	Rider	Team	Time
1	Rik Van Linden (BEL)	Rokado–De Gribaldy	6h 45' 12"
2	Marino Basso (ITA)	Bianchi–Campagnolo	s.t.
3	Roger De Vlaeminck (BEL)	Brooklyn	s.t.
4	Gerben Karstens (NED)	Rokado–De Gribaldy	s.t.
5	Franco Ongarato (ITA)	Dreherforte	s.t.
6	Aldo Parecchini (ITA)	Molteni	s.t.
7	Jean-Luc Molinéris (FRA)	Flandria–Carpenter–Shimano	+ 6"
8	Francesco Moser (ITA)	Filotex	s.t.
9	Pietro Gambarrotto (ITA)	Jollj Ceramica	s.t.
10	Enzo Brentegani (ITA)	Jollj Ceramica	s.t.

General classification after Stage 17

Rank	Rider	Team	Time
1	Eddy Merckx (BEL)	Molteni	89h 09' 18"
2	Felice Gimondi (ITA)	Bianchi–Campagnolo	+ 6' 56"
3	Giovanni Battaglin (ITA)	Jollj Ceramica	+ 9' 34"
4	Wladimiro Panizza (ITA)	G.B.C.–Sony	+ 11' 06"
5	José Pesarrodona (ESP)	Kas–Kaskol	+ 11' 17"
6	Franco Bitossi (ITA)	Sammontana	+ 12' 03"
7	Roger De Vlaeminck (BEL)	Brooklyn	+ 13' 10"
8	Santiago Lazcano (ESP)	Kas–Kaskol	+ 13' 51"
9	Gösta Pettersson (SWE)	Scic	+ 14' 53"
10	Gianni Motta (ITA)	Zonca	+ 16' 15"

== Stage 18 ==
7 June 1973 — Verona to Andalo, 173 km (107 mi)

Stage 18 result

Rank	Rider	Team	Time
1	Eddy Merckx (BEL)	Molteni	5h 17' 39"
2	Felice Gimondi (ITA)	Bianchi–Campagnolo	+ 46"
3	Giovanni Battaglin (ITA)	Jollj Ceramica	s.t.
4	Santiago Lazcano (ESP)	Kas–Kaskol	+ 2' 16"
5	Francisco Galdós (ESP)	Kas–Kaskol	+ 3' 16"
6	José Manuel Fuente (ESP)	Kas–Kaskol	+ 3' 30"
7	Italo Zilioli (ITA)	Dreherforte	+ 3' 41"
8	Gonzalo Aja (ESP)	Kas–Kaskol	+ 4' 34"
9	José Pesarrodona (ESP)	Kas–Kaskol	s.t.
10	Silvano Schiavon (ITA)	Magniflex	+ 5' 30"

General classification after Stage 18

Rank	Rider	Team	Time
1	Eddy Merckx (BEL)	Molteni	94h 26' 57"
2	Felice Gimondi (ITA)	Bianchi–Campagnolo	+ 7' 42"
3	Giovanni Battaglin (ITA)	Jollj Ceramica	+ 10' 20"
4	José Pesarrodona (ESP)	Kas–Kaskol	+ 15' 51"
5	Santiago Lazcano (ESP)	Kas–Kaskol	+ 16' 07"
6	Wladimiro Panizza (ITA)	G.B.C.–Sony	+ 19' 45"
7	Franco Bitossi (ITA)	Sammontana	+ 21' 22"
8	Gianni Motta (ITA)	Zonca	+ 22' 19"
9	Ole Ritter (DEN)	Bianchi–Campagnolo	+ 22' 55"
10	Roger De Vlaeminck (BEL)	Brooklyn	+ 26' 35"

== Stage 19 ==
8 June 1973 — Andalo to Auronzo di Cadore, 208 km (129 mi)

Stage 19 result

Rank	Rider	Team	Time
1	José Manuel Fuente (ESP)	Kas–Kaskol	6h 56' 20"
2	Francesco Moser (ITA)	Filotex	+ 1' 06"
3	Ole Ritter (DEN)	Bianchi–Campagnolo	+ 1' 07"
4	Eddy Merckx (BEL)	Molteni	+ 2' 38"
5	Felice Gimondi (ITA)	Bianchi–Campagnolo	s.t.
6	Enrico Paolini (ITA)	Scic	s.t.
7	Wladimiro Panizza (ITA)	G.B.C.–Sony	s.t.
8	José Pesarrodona (ESP)	Kas–Kaskol	s.t.
9	Gianni Motta (ITA)	Zonca	s.t.
10	Italo Zilioli (ITA)	Dreherforte	s.t.

General classification after Stage 19

Rank	Rider	Team	Time
1	Eddy Merckx (BEL)	Molteni	101h 25' 55"
2	Felice Gimondi (ITA)	Bianchi–Campagnolo	+ 7' 42"
3	Giovanni Battaglin (ITA)	Jollj Ceramica	+ 10' 20"
4	José Pesarrodona (ESP)	Kas–Kaskol	+ 15' 51"
5	Santiago Lazcano (ESP)	Kas–Kaskol	+ 19' 11"
6	Wladimiro Panizza (ITA)	G.B.C.–Sony	+ 19' 45"
7	Gianni Motta (ITA)	Zonca	+ 22' 19"
8	Ole Ritter (DEN)	Bianchi–Campagnolo	+ 24' 24"
9	José Manuel Fuente (ESP)	Kas–Kaskol	+ 26' 06"
10	Francisco Galdós (ESP)	Kas–Kaskol	+ 26' 35"

== Stage 20 ==
9 June 1973 — Auronzo di Cadore to Trieste, 197 km (122 mi)

Stage 20 result

Rank	Rider	Team	Time
1	Marino Basso (ITA)	Bianchi–Campagnolo	5h 28' 46"
2	Patrick Sercu (BEL)	Brooklyn	s.t.
3	Rik Van Linden (BEL)	Rokado–De Gribaldy	s.t.
4	Pietro Gambarrotto (ITA)	Jollj Ceramica	s.t.
5	Franco Ongarato (ITA)	Dreherforte	s.t.
6	Gianni Motta (ITA)	Zonca	s.t.
7	Gerben Karstens (NED)	Rokado–De Gribaldy	s.t.
8	Frans Mintjens (BEL)	Molteni	s.t.
9	Marcello Osler (ITA)	Sammontana	s.t.
10	Walter Avogadri (ITA)	Zonca	s.t.

General classification after Stage 20

Rank	Rider	Team	Time
1	Eddy Merckx (BEL)	Molteni	106h 54' 41"
2	Felice Gimondi (ITA)	Bianchi–Campagnolo	+ 7' 42"
3	Giovanni Battaglin (ITA)	Jollj Ceramica	+ 10' 20"
4	José Pesarrodona (ESP)	Kas–Kaskol	+ 15' 51"
5	Santiago Lazcano (ESP)	Kas–Kaskol	+ 19' 11"
6	Wladimiro Panizza (ITA)	G.B.C.–Sony	+ 19' 45"
7	Ole Ritter (DEN)	Bianchi–Campagnolo	+ 24' 24"
8	José Manuel Fuente (ESP)	Kas–Kaskol	+ 26' 06"
9	Francisco Galdós (ESP)	Kas–Kaskol	+ 26' 35"
10	Gianni Motta (ITA)	Zonca	+ 26' 49"
