= 1973 Giro d'Italia, Prologue to Stage 10 =

Cycling race stages

The 1973 Giro d'Italia was the 56th edition of the Giro d'Italia, one of cycling's Grand Tours. The Giro began with a prologue two-man team time trial in Verviers on 18 May, and Stage 10 occurred on 29 May with a stage to Lanciano. The race finished in Trieste on 9 June.

== Prologue ==
18 May 1973 — Verviers, 5.2 km (3.2 mi) (TTT)

Prologue result

Rank	Rider	Team	Time
1	Eddy Merckx (BEL)	Molteni	6' 47"
1	Roger Swerts (BEL)	Molteni	6' 47"
2	Roger De Vlaeminck (BEL)	Brooklyn	+ 2"
2	Patrick Sercu (BEL)	Brooklyn	+ 2"
3	José Manuel Fuente (ESP)	Kas–Kaskol	+ 7"
3	José Pesarrodona (ESP)	Kas–Kaskol	+ 7"
4	Josef Fuchs (SUI)	Filotex	+ 8"
4	Francesco Moser (ITA)	Filotex	+ 8"
5	Joseph Bruyère (BEL)	Molteni	s.t.
5	Victor Van Schil (BEL)	Molteni	s.t.

== Stage 1 ==
19 May 1973 — Verviers to Cologne, 137 km (85 mi)

Stage 1 result

Rank	Rider	Team	Time
1	Eddy Merckx (BEL)	Molteni	3h 09' 20"
2	Gerben Karstens (NED)	Rokado–De Gribaldy	+ 1"
3	Rik Van Linden (BEL)	Rokado–De Gribaldy	s.t.
4	Michele Dancelli (ITA)	Scic	s.t.
5	Patrick Sercu (BEL)	Brooklyn	+ 4"
6	Aldo Parecchini (ITA)	Molteni	+ 5"
7	Roger Swerts (BEL)	Molteni	s.t.
8	Roberto Poggiali (ITA)	Sammontana	s.t.
9	Francis Ducreux (FRA)	Flandria–Carpenter–Shimano	s.t.
10	Franco Bitossi (ITA)	Sammontana	s.t.

General classification after Stage 1

Rank	Rider	Team	Time
1	Eddy Merckx (BEL)	Molteni	3h 08' 50"
2	Gerben Karstens (NED)	Rokado–De Gribaldy	+ 20"
3	Rik Van Linden (BEL)	Rokado–De Gribaldy	+ 25"
4	Michele Dancelli (ITA)	Scic	s.t.
5	Patrick Sercu (BEL)	Brooklyn	+ 29"
6	Aldo Parecchini (ITA)	Molteni	+ 30"
7	Roger Swerts (BEL)	Molteni	s.t.
8	Roberto Poggiali (ITA)	Sammontana	s.t.
9	Francis Ducreux (FRA)	Flandria–Carpenter–Shimano	s.t.
10	Franco Bitossi (ITA)	Sammontana	s.t.

== Stage 2 ==
20 May 1973 — Cologne to Luxembourg, 227 km (141 mi)

Stage 2 result

Rank	Rider	Team	Time
1	Roger De Vlaeminck (BEL)	Brooklyn	6h 28' 33"
2	Franco Bitossi (ITA)	Sammontana	s.t.
3	Eddy Merckx (BEL)	Molteni	s.t.
4	Wladimiro Panizza (ITA)	G.B.C.–Sony	s.t.
5	Italo Zilioli (ITA)	Dreherforte	+ 42"
6	Patrick Sercu (BEL)	Brooklyn	+ 47"
7	Gerben Karstens (NED)	Rokado–De Gribaldy	s.t.
8	Giovanni Cavalcanti (ITA)	Bianchi–Campagnolo	s.t.
9	Marcello Bergamo (ITA)	Filotex	s.t.
10	Ole Ritter (DEN)	Bianchi–Campagnolo	s.t.

General classification after Stage 2

Rank	Rider	Team	Time
1	Eddy Merckx (BEL)	Molteni	9h 37' 53"
2	Franco Bitossi (ITA)	Sammontana	+ 5"
3	Wladimiro Panizza (ITA)	G.B.C.–Sony	s.t.
4	Roger De Vlaeminck (BEL)	Brooklyn	s.t.
5	Italo Zilioli (ITA)	Dreherforte	+ 38"
6	Gerben Karstens (NED)	Rokado–De Gribaldy	s.t.
7	Michele Dancelli (ITA)	Scic	s.t.
8	Patrick Sercu (BEL)	Brooklyn	+ 41"
9	Roger Swerts (BEL)	Molteni	+ 42"
10	Roberto Poggiali (ITA)	Sammontana	s.t.

== Stage 3 ==
21 May 1973 — Luxembourg to Strasbourg, 239 km (149 mi)

Stage 3 result

Rank	Rider	Team	Time
1	Gustav Van Roosbroeck (BEL)	Rokado–De Gribaldy	6h 55' 01"
2	Marino Basso (ITA)	Bianchi–Campagnolo	s.t.
3	Pierino Gavazzi (ITA)	Jollj Ceramica	s.t.
4	Aldo Parecchini (ITA)	Molteni	s.t.
5	Roger De Vlaeminck (BEL)	Brooklyn	s.t.
6	Franco Ongarato (ITA)	Dreherforte	s.t.
7	Marcello Osler (ITA)	Sammontana	s.t.
8	Daniel Ducreux (FRA)	Flandria–Carpenter–Shimano	s.t.
9	Franco Bitossi (ITA)	Sammontana	s.t.
10	Arnaldo Caverzasi (ITA)	Filotex	s.t.

General classification after Stage 3

Rank	Rider	Team	Time
1	Eddy Merckx (BEL)	Molteni	16h 32' 54"
2	Franco Bitossi (ITA)	Sammontana	+ 5"
3	Roger De Vlaeminck (BEL)	Brooklyn	s.t.
4	Wladimiro Panizza (ITA)	G.B.C.–Sony	+ 13"
5	Michele Dancelli (ITA)	Scic	+ 38"
6	Gerben Karstens (NED)	Rokado–De Gribaldy	s.t.
7	Patrick Sercu (BEL)	Brooklyn	+ 41"
8	Roger Swerts (BEL)	Molteni	+ 42"
9	Ole Ritter (DEN)	Bianchi–Campagnolo	s.t.
10	Hennie Kuiper (NED)	Rokado–De Gribaldy	s.t.

== Stage 4 ==
22 May 1973 — Geneva to Aosta, 163 km (101 mi)

Stage 4 result

Rank	Rider	Team	Time
1	Eddy Merckx (BEL)	Molteni	4h 43' 40"
2	José Manuel Fuente (ESP)	Kas–Kaskol	+ 1"
3	Giovanni Battaglin (ITA)	Jollj Ceramica	s.t.
4	Gonzalo Aja (ESP)	Kas–Kaskol	s.t.
5	Roger De Vlaeminck (BEL)	Brooklyn	+ 24"
6	Domingo Perurena (ESP)	Kas–Kaskol	s.t.
7	Felice Gimondi (ITA)	Bianchi–Campagnolo	s.t.
8	Enrico Paolini (ITA)	Scic	s.t.
9	Franco Bitossi (ITA)	Sammontana	s.t.
10	Gianni Motta (ITA)	Zonca	s.t.

General classification after Stage 4

Rank	Rider	Team	Time
1	Eddy Merckx (BEL)	Molteni	21h 16' 34"
2	Franco Bitossi (ITA)	Sammontana	+ 29"
3	Roger De Vlaeminck (BEL)	Brooklyn	s.t.
4	Wladimiro Panizza (ITA)	G.B.C.–Sony	+ 37"
5	José Manuel Fuente (ESP)	Kas–Kaskol	+ 51"
6	Giovanni Battaglin (ITA)	Jollj Ceramica	s.t.
7	Ole Ritter (DEN)	Bianchi–Campagnolo	+ 1' 06"
8	Hennie Kuiper (NED)	Rokado–De Gribaldy	s.t.
9	Roberto Poggiali (ITA)	Sammontana	+ 1' 14"
10	Josef Fuchs (SUI)	Filotex	s.t.

== Rest day ==
23 May 1973

Following Stage 4, the riders remained in Aosta, Italy, for the first of the race's two scheduled rest days before embarking on Stage 5 toward Milan.

== Stage 5 ==
24 May 1973 — St. Vincent to Milan, 173 km (107 mi)

Stage 5 result

Rank	Rider	Team	Time
1	Gerben Karstens (NED)	Rokado–De Gribaldy	4h 17' 45"
2	Marino Basso (ITA)	Bianchi–Campagnolo	s.t.
3	Patrick Sercu (BEL)	Brooklyn	s.t.
4	Rik Van Linden (BEL)	Rokado–De Gribaldy	s.t.
5	Roger De Vlaeminck (BEL)	Brooklyn	s.t.
6	Aldo Parecchini (ITA)	Molteni	s.t.
7	Franco Ongarato (ITA)	Dreherforte	s.t.
8	Franco Bitossi (ITA)	Sammontana	s.t.
9	Michele Dancelli (ITA)	Scic	s.t.
10	Eddy Merckx (BEL)	Molteni	s.t.

General classification after Stage 5

Rank	Rider	Team	Time
1	Eddy Merckx (BEL)	Molteni	25h 34' 19"
2	Franco Bitossi (ITA)	Sammontana	+ 29"
3	Roger De Vlaeminck (BEL)	Brooklyn	s.t.
4	Wladimiro Panizza (ITA)	G.B.C.–Sony	+ 37"
5	José Manuel Fuente (ESP)	Kas–Kaskol	+ 51"
6	Giovanni Battaglin (ITA)	Jollj Ceramica	s.t.
7	Hennie Kuiper (NED)	Rokado–De Gribaldy	+ 1' 06"
8	Ole Ritter (DEN)	Bianchi–Campagnolo	s.t.
9	Roberto Poggiali (ITA)	Sammontana	+ 1' 14"
10	Santiago Lazcano (ESP)	Kas–Kaskol	s.t.

== Stage 6 ==
25 May 1973 — Milan to Iseo, 144 km (89 mi)

Stage 6 result

Rank	Rider	Team	Time
1	Gianni Motta (ITA)	Zonca	3h 49' 58"
2	Felice Gimondi (ITA)	Bianchi–Campagnolo	s.t.
3	Ole Ritter (DEN)	Bianchi–Campagnolo	s.t.
4	Franco Bitossi (ITA)	Sammontana	s.t.
5	Wladimiro Panizza (ITA)	G.B.C.–Sony	s.t.
6	Eddy Merckx (BEL)	Molteni	s.t.
7	Giovanni Battaglin (ITA)	Jollj Ceramica	s.t.
8	Roger De Vlaeminck (BEL)	Brooklyn	+ 1' 23"
9	José Pesarrodona (ESP)	Kas–Kaskol	s.t.
10	Roberto Poggiali (ITA)	Sammontana	s.t.

General classification after Stage 6

Rank	Rider	Team	Time
1	Eddy Merckx (BEL)	Molteni	29h 24' 17"
2	Franco Bitossi (ITA)	Sammontana	+ 29"
3	Wladimiro Panizza (ITA)	G.B.C.–Sony	+ 37"
4	Giovanni Battaglin (ITA)	Jollj Ceramica	+ 51"
5	Ole Ritter (DEN)	Bianchi–Campagnolo	+ 1' 06"
6	Felice Gimondi (ITA)	Bianchi–Campagnolo	+ 1' 14"
7	Gianni Motta (ITA)	Zonca	+ 1' 43"
8	Roger De Vlaeminck (BEL)	Brooklyn	+ 1' 52"
9	Roberto Poggiali (ITA)	Sammontana	+ 2' 37"
10	Santiago Lazcano (ESP)	Kas–Kaskol	s.t.

== Stage 7 ==
26 May 1973 — Iseo to Lido delle Nazioni, 248 km (154 mi)

Stage 7 result

Rank	Rider	Team	Time
1	Rik Van Linden (BEL)	Rokado–De Gribaldy	7h 07' 57"
2	Patrick Sercu (BEL)	Brooklyn	s.t.
3	Roger De Vlaeminck (BEL)	Brooklyn	s.t.
4	Marino Basso (ITA)	Bianchi–Campagnolo	s.t.
5	Daniel Ducreux (FRA)	Flandria–Carpenter–Shimano	s.t.
6	Gerben Karstens (NED)	Rokado–De Gribaldy	s.t.
7	Marcello Osler (ITA)	Sammontana	s.t.
8	Franco Ongarato (ITA)	Dreherforte	s.t.
9	Eddy Merckx (BEL)	Molteni	s.t.
10	Ole Ritter (DEN)	Bianchi–Campagnolo	s.t.

General classification after Stage 7

Rank	Rider	Team	Time
1	Eddy Merckx (BEL)	Molteni	36h 32' 14"
2	Franco Bitossi (ITA)	Sammontana	+ 29"
3	Wladimiro Panizza (ITA)	G.B.C.–Sony	+ 37"
4	Giovanni Battaglin (ITA)	Jollj Ceramica	+ 51"
5	Ole Ritter (DEN)	Bianchi–Campagnolo	+ 1' 06"
6	Felice Gimondi (ITA)	Bianchi–Campagnolo	+ 1' 14"
7	Gianni Motta (ITA)	Zonca	+ 1' 43"
8	Roger De Vlaeminck (BEL)	Brooklyn	+ 1' 52"
9	Roberto Poggiali (ITA)	Sammontana	+ 2' 37"
10	Santiago Lazcano (ESP)	Kas–Kaskol	s.t.

== Stage 8 ==
27 May 1973 — Lido delle Nazioni to Monte Carpegna, 156 km (97 mi)

Stage 8 result

Rank	Rider	Team	Time
1	Eddy Merckx (BEL)	Molteni	4h 40' 36"
2	Giovanni Battaglin (ITA)	Jollj Ceramica	+ 45"
3	Italo Zilioli (ITA)	Dreherforte	+ 4' 16"
4	Gianni Motta (ITA)	Zonca	+ 4' 19"
5	Felice Gimondi (ITA)	Bianchi–Campagnolo	s.t.
6	Franco Bitossi (ITA)	Sammontana	s.t.
7	Wladimiro Panizza (ITA)	G.B.C.–Sony	+ 4' 34"
8	José Pesarrodona (ESP)	Kas–Kaskol	s.t.
9	Roberto Poggiali (ITA)	Sammontana	+ 4' 52"
10	Gösta Pettersson (SWE)	Scic	s.t.

General classification after Stage 8

Rank	Rider	Team	Time
1	Eddy Merckx (BEL)	Molteni	41h 12' 50"
2	Giovanni Battaglin (ITA)	Jollj Ceramica	+ 1' 36"
3	Franco Bitossi (ITA)	Sammontana	+ 4' 48"
4	Wladimiro Panizza (ITA)	G.B.C.–Sony	+ 5' 33"
5	Felice Gimondi (ITA)	Bianchi–Campagnolo	s.t.
6	Gianni Motta (ITA)	Zonca	+ 6' 02"
7	José Pesarrodona (ESP)	Kas–Kaskol	+ 7' 11"
8	Roberto Poggiali (ITA)	Sammontana	+ 7' 29"
9	Santiago Lazcano (ESP)	Kas–Kaskol	s.t.
10	Francisco Galdós (ESP)	Kas–Kaskol	+ 9' 16"

== Stage 9 ==
28 May 1973 — Carpegna to Alba Adriatica, 243 km (151 mi)

Stage 9 result

Rank	Rider	Team	Time
1	Patrick Sercu (BEL)	Brooklyn	5h 56' 39"
2	Rik Van Linden (BEL)	Rokado–De Gribaldy	s.t.
3	Franco Ongarato (ITA)	Dreherforte	s.t.
4	Gerben Karstens (NED)	Rokado–De Gribaldy	s.t.
5	Gianni Motta (ITA)	Zonca	s.t.
6	Daniel Ducreux (FRA)	Flandria–Carpenter–Shimano	s.t.
7	Pierino Gavazzi (ITA)	Jollj Ceramica	s.t.
8	Mauro Simonetti (ITA)	Sammontana	s.t.
9	Giovanni Dalla Bona (ITA)	Dreherforte	s.t.
10	Aldo Parecchini (ITA)	Molteni	s.t.

General classification after Stage 9

Rank	Rider	Team	Time
1	Eddy Merckx (BEL)	Molteni	47h 09' 23"
2	Giovanni Battaglin (ITA)	Jollj Ceramica	+ 1' 36"
3	Franco Bitossi (ITA)	Sammontana	+ 4' 48"
4	Wladimiro Panizza (ITA)	G.B.C.–Sony	+ 5' 11"
5	Felice Gimondi (ITA)	Bianchi–Campagnolo	+ 5' 33"
6	Gianni Motta (ITA)	Zonca	+ 6' 02"
7	José Pesarrodona (ESP)	Kas–Kaskol	+ 7' 11"
8	Roberto Poggiali (ITA)	Sammontana	+ 7' 29"
9	Santiago Lazcano (ESP)	Kas–Kaskol	s.t.
10	Francisco Galdós (ESP)	Kas–Kaskol	+ 9' 16"

== Stage 10 ==
29 May 1973 — Alba Adriatica to Lanciano, 174 km (108 mi)

Stage 10 result

Rank	Rider	Team	Time
1	Eddy Merckx (BEL)	Molteni	5h 17' 34"
2	José Manuel Fuente (ESP)	Kas–Kaskol	s.t.
3	Wladimiro Panizza (ITA)	G.B.C.–Sony	+ 6"
4	Roger De Vlaeminck (BEL)	Brooklyn	+ 1' 54"
5	Gianni Motta (ITA)	Zonca	s.t.
6	Felice Gimondi (ITA)	Bianchi–Campagnolo	s.t.
7	José Pesarrodona (ESP)	Kas–Kaskol	s.t.
8	Franco Bitossi (ITA)	Sammontana	s.t.
9	Ole Ritter (DEN)	Bianchi–Campagnolo	s.t.
10	Roberto Poggiali (ITA)	Sammontana	+ 1' 57"

General classification after Stage 10

Rank	Rider	Team	Time
1	Eddy Merckx (BEL)	Molteni	52h 27' 03"
2	Giovanni Battaglin (ITA)	Jollj Ceramica	+ 3' 33"
3	Wladimiro Panizza (ITA)	G.B.C.–Sony	+ 5' 47"
4	Franco Bitossi (ITA)	Sammontana	+ 6' 42"
5	Felice Gimondi (ITA)	Bianchi–Campagnolo	+ 7' 27"
6	Gianni Motta (ITA)	Zonca	+ 7' 56"
7	José Pesarrodona (ESP)	Kas–Kaskol	+ 9' 03"
8	Roberto Poggiali (ITA)	Sammontana	+ 9' 26"
9	Santiago Lazcano (ESP)	Kas–Kaskol	+ 9' 28"
10	Francisco Galdós (ESP)	Kas–Kaskol	+ 11' 13"
