= 1974 Giro d'Italia, Stage 12 to Stage 22 =

Cycling race stages

The 1974 Giro d'Italia was the 57th edition of the Giro d'Italia, one of cycling's Grand Tours. The Giro began in the Vatican City on 16 May, and Stage 12 occurred on 28 May with a stage from Forte dei Marmi. The race finished in Milan on 8 June.

== Stage 12 ==
28 May 1974 — Forte dei Marmi to Forte dei Marmi, 40 km (25 mi) (ITT)

Stage 12 result

Rank	Rider	Team	Time
1	Eddy Merckx (BEL)	Molteni	49' 31"
2	Francesco Moser (ITA)	Filotex	+ 27"
3	Gösta Pettersson (SWE)	Magniflex	+ 48"
4	Ole Ritter (DEN)	Filotex	+ 1' 00"
5	Knut Knudsen (NOR)	Jollj Ceramica	+ 1' 13"
6	Felice Gimondi (ITA)	Bianchi–Campagnolo	+ 1' 23"
7	Gianbattista Baronchelli (ITA)	Scic	+ 1' 26"
8	Roger De Vlaeminck (BEL)	Brooklyn	s.t.
9	Simone Fraccaro (ITA)	Filcas	+ 1' 53"
10	Giovanni Battaglin (ITA)	Jollj Ceramica	+ 1' 54"

General classification after Stage 12

Rank	Rider	Team	Time
1	José Manuel Fuente (ESP)	Kas–Kaskol	58h 59' 47"
2	Eddy Merckx (BEL)	Molteni	+ 18"
3	Gianbattista Baronchelli (ITA)	Scic	+ 2' 31"
4	Felice Gimondi (ITA)	Bianchi–Campagnolo	+ 2' 41"
5	Francesco Moser (ITA)	Filotex	+ 2' 49"
6	Roger De Vlaeminck (BEL)	Brooklyn	+ 2' 51"
7	Giovanni Battaglin (ITA)	Jollj Ceramica	+ 3' 03"
8	Franco Bitossi (ITA)	Scic	+ 3' 09"
9	Constantino Conti (ITA)	Zonca	+ 3' 22"
10	Gösta Pettersson (SWE)	Magniflex	+ 4' 21"

== Rest day ==
29 May 1974

== Stage 13 ==
30 May 1974 — Forte dei Marmi to Pietra Ligure, 231 km (144 mi)

Stage 13 result

Rank	Rider	Team	Time
1	Enrico Paolini (ITA)	Scic	6h 23' 13"
2	Pierino Gavazzi (ITA)	Jollj Ceramica	s.t.
3	Roger De Vlaeminck (BEL)	Brooklyn	s.t.
4	Marino Basso (ITA)	Bianchi–Campagnolo	s.t.
5	Alessio Antonini (ITA)	Jollj Ceramica	s.t.
6	Patrick Sercu (BEL)	Brooklyn	s.t.
7	Gianfranco Foresti (ITA)	Bianchi–Campagnolo	s.t.
8	Roland Salm (SUI)	Zonca	s.t.
9	Francesco Moser (ITA)	Filotex	s.t.
10	Hennie Kuiper (NED)	Rokado	s.t.

General classification after Stage 13

Rank	Rider	Team	Time
1	José Manuel Fuente (ESP)	Kas–Kaskol	65h 23' 00"
2	Eddy Merckx (BEL)	Molteni	+ 18"
3	Gianbattista Baronchelli (ITA)	Scic	+ 2' 31"
4	Felice Gimondi (ITA)	Bianchi–Campagnolo	+ 2' 41"
5	Francesco Moser (ITA)	Filotex	+ 2' 49"
6	Roger De Vlaeminck (BEL)	Brooklyn	+ 2' 51"
7	Giovanni Battaglin (ITA)	Jollj Ceramica	+ 3' 03"
8	Constantino Conti (ITA)	Zonca	+ 3' 32"
9	Gösta Pettersson (SWE)	Magniflex	+ 4' 21"
10	Franco Bitossi (ITA)	Scic	+ 4' 29"

== Stage 14 ==
31 May 1974 — Pietra Ligure to Sanremo, 189 km (117 mi)

Stage 14 result

Rank	Rider	Team	Time
1	Giuseppe Perletto (ITA)	Sammontana	5h 21' 58"
2	Wladimiro Panizza (ITA)	Brooklyn	+ 21"
3	Gianbattista Baronchelli (ITA)	Scic	+ 40"
4	José Luis Uribezubia (ESP)	Kas–Kaskol	s.t.
5	Vicente López Carril (ESP)	Kas–Kaskol	s.t.
6	Franco Bitossi (ITA)	Scic	+ 2' 18"
7	Roger De Vlaeminck (BEL)	Brooklyn	s.t.
8	Constantino Conti (ITA)	Zonca	s.t.
9	Francesco Moser (ITA)	Filotex	s.t.
10	Felice Gimondi (ITA)	Bianchi–Campagnolo	s.t.

General classification after Stage 14

Rank	Rider	Team	Time
1	Eddy Merckx (BEL)	Molteni	70h 47' 34"
2	Gianbattista Baronchelli (ITA)	Scic	+ 35"
3	Felice Gimondi (ITA)	Bianchi–Campagnolo	+ 2' 23"
4	Francesco Moser (ITA)	Filotex	+ 2' 31"
5	Roger De Vlaeminck (BEL)	Brooklyn	+ 2' 33"
6	Giovanni Battaglin (ITA)	Jollj Ceramica	+ 2' 45"
7	Constantino Conti (ITA)	Zonca	+ 3' 14"
8	Gösta Pettersson (SWE)	Magniflex	+ 4' 03"
9	Franco Bitossi (ITA)	Scic	+ 4' 11"
10	José Luis Uribezubia (ESP)	Kas–Kaskol	+ 4' 52"

== Stage 15 ==
1 June 1974 — Sanremo to Valenza, 206 km (128 mi)

Stage 15 result

Rank	Rider	Team	Time
1	Ercole Gualazzini (ITA)	Brooklyn	5h 51' 54"
2	Bruno Zanoni (ITA)	Scic	s.t.
3	Mauro Simonetti (ITA)	Sammontana	s.t.
4	Martín Emilio Rodríguez (COL)	Bianchi–Campagnolo	s.t.
5	Bruce Biddle (NZL)	Magniflex	s.t.
6	Luciano Borgognoni (ITA)	Dreherforte	+ 5"
7	Roger De Vlaeminck (BEL)	Brooklyn	s.t.
8	Patrick Sercu (BEL)	Brooklyn	s.t.
9	Franco Bitossi (ITA)	Scic	s.t.
10	Marino Basso (ITA)	Bianchi–Campagnolo	s.t.

General classification after Stage 15

Rank	Rider	Team	Time
1	Eddy Merckx (BEL)	Molteni	76h 39' 33"
2	Gianbattista Baronchelli (ITA)	Scic	+ 35"
3	Felice Gimondi (ITA)	Bianchi–Campagnolo	+ 2' 23"
4	Francesco Moser (ITA)	Filotex	+ 2' 31"
5	Roger De Vlaeminck (BEL)	Brooklyn	+ 2' 33"
6	Giovanni Battaglin (ITA)	Jollj Ceramica	+ 2' 45"
7	Constantino Conti (ITA)	Zonca	+ 3' 14"
8	Gösta Pettersson (SWE)	Magniflex	+ 4' 03"
9	Franco Bitossi (ITA)	Scic	+ 4' 11"
10	José Luis Uribezubia (ESP)	Kas–Kaskol	+ 4' 52"

== Stage 16 ==
2 June 1974 — Valenza to Monte Generoso, 158 km (98 mi)

Stage 16 result

Rank	Rider	Team	Time
1	José Manuel Fuente (ESP)	Kas–Kaskol	4h 20' 59"
2	Felice Gimondi (ITA)	Bianchi–Campagnolo	+ 31"
3	Giuseppe Perletto (ITA)	Sammontana	+ 38"
4	Giovanni Battaglin (ITA)	Jollj Ceramica	+ 45"
5	Constantino Conti (ITA)	Zonca	+ 1' 27"
6	Antoine Houbrechts (BEL)	Bianchi–Campagnolo	+ 1' 40"
7	Gösta Pettersson (SWE)	Magniflex	+ 1' 41"
8	Wladimiro Panizza (ITA)	Brooklyn	+ 1' 52"
9	Roger De Vlaeminck (BEL)	Brooklyn	+ 2' 10"
10	Gianni Motta (ITA)	Magniflex	s.t.

General classification after Stage 16

Rank	Rider	Team	Time
1	Eddy Merckx (BEL)	Molteni	81h 02' 53"
2	Felice Gimondi (ITA)	Bianchi–Campagnolo	+ 33"
3	Gianbattista Baronchelli (ITA)	Scic	+ 41"
4	Giovanni Battaglin (ITA)	Jollj Ceramica	+ 1' 09"
5	Constantino Conti (ITA)	Zonca	+ 2' 20"
6	Roger De Vlaeminck (BEL)	Brooklyn	+ 2' 22"
7	Gösta Pettersson (SWE)	Magniflex	+ 3' 23"
8	Francesco Moser (ITA)	Filotex	+ 3' 33"
9	Franco Bitossi (ITA)	Scic	+ 4' 17"
10	José Luis Uribezubia (ESP)	Kas–Kaskol	+ 4' 52"

== Stage 17 ==
3 June 1974 — Como to Iseo, 158 km (98 mi)

Stage 17 result

Rank	Rider	Team	Time
1	Santiago Lazcano (ESP)	Kas–Kaskol	3h 52' 36"
2	José Manuel Fuente (ESP)	Kas–Kaskol	s.t.
3	Roger De Vlaeminck (BEL)	Brooklyn	+ 13"
4	Francesco Moser (ITA)	Filotex	s.t.
5	Franco Bitossi (ITA)	Scic	s.t.
6	Giovanni Battaglin (ITA)	Jollj Ceramica	s.t.
7	Vicente López Carril (ESP)	Kas–Kaskol	s.t.
8	Constantino Conti (ITA)	Zonca	s.t.
9	Felice Gimondi (ITA)	Bianchi–Campagnolo	s.t.
10	Roberto Poggiali (ITA)	Filotex	s.t.

General classification after Stage 17

Rank	Rider	Team	Time
1	Eddy Merckx (BEL)	Molteni	84h 55' 42"
2	Felice Gimondi (ITA)	Bianchi–Campagnolo	+ 33"
3	Gianbattista Baronchelli (ITA)	Scic	+ 41"
4	Giovanni Battaglin (ITA)	Jollj Ceramica	+ 1' 09"
5	Constantino Conti (ITA)	Zonca	+ 2' 20"
6	Roger De Vlaeminck (BEL)	Brooklyn	+ 2' 22"
7	Gösta Pettersson (SWE)	Magniflex	+ 3' 23"
8	Francesco Moser (ITA)	Filotex	+ 3' 33"
9	Franco Bitossi (ITA)	Scic	+ 4' 17"
10	José Luis Uribezubia (ESP)	Kas–Kaskol	+ 4' 52"

== Stage 18 ==
4 June 1974 — Iseo to Sella Valsugana, 190 km (120 mi)

Stage 18 result

Rank	Rider	Team	Time
1	Franco Bitossi (ITA)	Scic	5h 45' 45"
2	Eddy Merckx (BEL)	Molteni	s.t.
3	Felice Gimondi (ITA)	Bianchi–Campagnolo	s.t.
4	Constantino Conti (ITA)	Zonca	s.t.
5	Francesco Moser (ITA)	Filotex	s.t.
6	Wladimiro Panizza (ITA)	Brooklyn	s.t.
7	José Manuel Fuente (ESP)	Kas–Kaskol	s.t.
8	Giovanni Battaglin (ITA)	Jollj Ceramica	s.t.
9	Gianbattista Baronchelli (ITA)	Scic	s.t.
10	Vicente López Carril (ESP)	Kas–Kaskol	s.t.

General classification after Stage 18

Rank	Rider	Team	Time
1	Eddy Merckx (BEL)	Molteni	90h 41' 27"
2	Felice Gimondi (ITA)	Bianchi–Campagnolo	+ 33"
3	Gianbattista Baronchelli (ITA)	Scic	+ 41"
4	Giovanni Battaglin (ITA)	Jollj Ceramica	+ 1' 09"
5	Constantino Conti (ITA)	Zonca	+ 2' 20"
6	Francesco Moser (ITA)	Filotex	+ 3' 33"
7	Gösta Pettersson (SWE)	Magniflex	+ 3' 40"
8	Franco Bitossi (ITA)	Scic	+ 4' 17"
9	José Manuel Fuente (ESP)	Kas–Kaskol	+ 5' 09"
10	José Luis Uribezubia (ESP)	Kas–Kaskol	+ 7' 32"

== Stage 19 ==
5 June 1974 — Borgo Valsugana to Pordenone, 146 km (91 mi)

Stage 19 result

Rank	Rider	Team	Time
1	Enrico Paolini (ITA)	Scic	4h 04' 39"
2	Knut Knudsen (NOR)	Jollj Ceramica	s.t.
3	Marino Basso (ITA)	Bianchi–Campagnolo	s.t.
4	Günter Haritz (FRG)	Rokado	s.t.
5	Luciano Borgognoni (ITA)	Dreherforte	s.t.
6	Mauro Simonetti (ITA)	Sammontana	s.t.
7	Luciano Rossignoli (ITA)	Filcas	s.t.
8	Wilmo Francioni (ITA)	Sammontana	s.t.
9	Johan Ruch (FRG)	Rokado	s.t.
10	Pierino Gavazzi (ITA)	Jollj Ceramica	s.t.

General classification after Stage 19

Rank	Rider	Team	Time
1	Eddy Merckx (BEL)	Molteni	96h 24' 07"
2	Felice Gimondi (ITA)	Bianchi–Campagnolo	+ 33"
3	Gianbattista Baronchelli (ITA)	Scic	+ 41"
4	Giovanni Battaglin (ITA)	Jollj Ceramica	+ 1' 09"
5	Constantino Conti (ITA)	Zonca	+ 2' 20"
6	Francesco Moser (ITA)	Filotex	+ 3' 33"
7	Gösta Pettersson (SWE)	Magniflex	+ 3' 40"
8	Franco Bitossi (ITA)	Scic	+ 4' 17"
9	José Manuel Fuente (ESP)	Kas–Kaskol	+ 5' 09"
10	José Luis Uribezubia (ESP)	Kas–Kaskol	+ 7' 32"

== Stage 20 ==
6 June 1974 — Pordenone to Tre Cime di Lavaredo, 163 km (101 mi)

Stage 20 result

Rank	Rider	Team	Time
1	José Manuel Fuente (ESP)	Kas–Kaskol	5h 40' 53"
2	Gianbattista Baronchelli (ITA)	Scic	+ 1' 18"
3	Constantino Conti (ITA)	Zonca	+ 1' 41"
4	Eddy Merckx (BEL)	Molteni	+ 1' 47"
5	Vicente López Carril (ESP)	Kas–Kaskol	s.t.
6	Felice Gimondi (ITA)	Bianchi–Campagnolo	s.t.
7	Giovanni Battaglin (ITA)	Jollj Ceramica	+ 1' 58"
8	Franco Bitossi (ITA)	Scic	+ 2' 10"
9	Francisco Galdós (ESP)	Kas–Kaskol	+ 2' 27"
10	Giuseppe Perletto (ITA)	Sammontana	+ 2' 37"

General classification after Stage 20

Rank	Rider	Team	Time
1	Eddy Merckx (BEL)	Molteni	100h 28' 46"
2	Gianbattista Baronchelli (ITA)	Scic	+ 12"
3	Felice Gimondi (ITA)	Bianchi–Campagnolo	+ 33"
4	Giovanni Battaglin (ITA)	Jollj Ceramica	+ 1' 20"
5	Constantino Conti (ITA)	Zonca	+ 2' 14"
6	José Manuel Fuente (ESP)	Kas–Kaskol	+ 3' 22"
7	Franco Bitossi (ITA)	Scic	+ 4' 40"
8	Gösta Pettersson (SWE)	Magniflex	+ 5' 43"
9	Francesco Moser (ITA)	Filotex	+ 6' 17"
10	Vicente López Carril (ESP)	Kas–Kaskol	+ 8' 16"

== Stage 21 ==
7 June 1974 — Misurina to Bassano del Grappa, 194 km (121 mi)

Stage 21 result

Rank	Rider	Team	Time
1	Eddy Merckx (BEL)	Molteni	6h 08' 08"
2	Francesco Moser (ITA)	Filotex	s.t.
3	Felice Gimondi (ITA)	Bianchi–Campagnolo	s.t.
4	Gianbattista Baronchelli (ITA)	Scic	s.t.
5	Constantino Conti (ITA)	Zonca	s.t.
6	José Manuel Fuente (ESP)	Kas–Kaskol	s.t.
7	Antoine Houbrechts (BEL)	Bianchi–Campagnolo	+ 2' 12"
8	Vicente López Carril (ESP)	Kas–Kaskol	s.t.
9	Roger De Vlaeminck (BEL)	Brooklyn	+ 3' 02"
10	Martín Emilio Rodríguez (COL)	Bianchi–Campagnolo	s.t.

General classification after Stage 21

Rank	Rider	Team	Time
1	Eddy Merckx (BEL)	Molteni	106h 36' 54"
2	Gianbattista Baronchelli (ITA)	Scic	+ 12"
3	Felice Gimondi (ITA)	Bianchi–Campagnolo	+ 33"
4	Constantino Conti (ITA)	Zonca	+ 2' 14"
5	José Manuel Fuente (ESP)	Kas–Kaskol	+ 3' 22"
6	Giovanni Battaglin (ITA)	Jollj Ceramica	+ 4' 22"
7	Francesco Moser (ITA)	Filotex	+ 6' 17"
8	Vicente López Carril (ESP)	Kas–Kaskol	+ 10' 28"
9	Franco Bitossi (ITA)	Scic	+ 16' 05"
10	Gösta Pettersson (SWE)	Magniflex	+ 17' 08"

== Stage 22 ==
8 June 1974 — Bassano del Grappa to Milan, 257 km (160 mi)

Stage 22 result

Rank	Rider	Team	Time
1	Marino Basso (ITA)	Bianchi–Campagnolo	6h 31' 19"
2	Roger De Vlaeminck (BEL)	Brooklyn	s.t.
3	Franco Bitossi (ITA)	Scic	s.t.
4	Ercole Gualazzini (ITA)	Brooklyn	s.t.
5	Francesco Moser (ITA)	Filotex	s.t.
6	Enrico Paolini (ITA)	Scic	s.t.
7	Mauro Simonetti (ITA)	Sammontana	s.t.
8	Gonzalo Aja (ESP)	Kas–Kaskol	s.t.
9	Attilio Benfatto (ITA)	Filcas	s.t.
10	Luciano Rossignoli (ITA)	Filcas	s.t.

General classification after Stage 22

Rank	Rider	Team	Time
1	Eddy Merckx (BEL)	Molteni	113h 08' 13"
2	Gianbattista Baronchelli (ITA)	Scic	+ 12"
3	Felice Gimondi (ITA)	Bianchi–Campagnolo	+ 33"
4	Constantino Conti (ITA)	Zonca	+ 2' 14"
5	José Manuel Fuente (ESP)	Kas–Kaskol	+ 3' 22"
6	Giovanni Battaglin (ITA)	Jollj Ceramica	+ 4' 22"
7	Francesco Moser (ITA)	Filotex	+ 6' 17"
8	Vicente López Carril (ESP)	Kas–Kaskol	+ 10' 28"
9	Franco Bitossi (ITA)	Scic	+ 16' 05"
10	Gösta Pettersson (SWE)	Magniflex	+ 17' 08"
