= 1974 Tour de Suisse =

Race details
- Dates: 13–21 June 1974
- Stages: 9 + Prologue
- Distance: 1,559 km (968.7 mi)
- Winning time: 45h 05' 56"

Results
	Winner	Eddy Merckx (BEL)	(Molteni)
	Second	Gösta Pettersson (SWE)	(Magniflex)
	Third	Louis Pfenninger (SUI)	(Zonca)
	Points	Eddy Merckx (BEL)	(Molteni)
	Mountains	Eddy Merckx (BEL)	(Molteni)
	Team	Kas–Kaskol	

The 1974 Tour de Suisse was the 38th edition of the Tour de Suisse cycle race and was held from 13 June to 21 June 1974. The race started in Gippingen and finished in Olten. The race was won by Eddy Merckx of the Molteni team.

== General classification ==
Final general classification

Rank	Rider	Team	Time
1	Eddy Merckx (BEL)	Molteni	45h 05' 56"
2	Gösta Pettersson (SWE)	Magniflex	+ 58"
3	Louis Pfenninger (SUI)	Zonca	+ 2' 25"
4	Vicente López (ESP)	Kas–Kaskol	+ 3' 01"
5	Costantino Conti (ITA)	Zonca	+ 3' 40"
6	Gonzalo Aja (ESP)	Kas–Kaskol	+ 3' 50"
7	Franco Bitossi (ITA)	Scic	+ 4' 23"
8	Santiago Lazcano (ESP)	Kas–Kaskol	+ 5' 59"
9	Giovanni Battaglin (ITA)	Jollj Ceramica	+ 6' 00"
10	Erich Spahn (SUI)	Zonca	+ 8' 15"
