= 1970 Tour du Haut Var =

Race details
- Dates: 2 March 1970
- Stages: 1
- Distance: 135 km (83.89 mi)
- Winning time: 3h 50' 45"

Results
	Winner	René Grelin (FRA)
	Second	Wladimiro Panizza (ITA)
	Third	Roberto Poggiali (ITA)

The 1970 Tour du Haut Var was the second edition of the Tour du Haut Var cycle race and was held on 2 March 1970. The race started in Nice and finished in Seillans. The race was won by René Grelin.

== General classification ==
Final general classification

Rank	Rider	Time
1	René Grelin (FRA)	3h 50' 45"
2	Wladimiro Panizza (ITA)	+ 0"
3	Roberto Poggiali (ITA)	+ 2"
4	Roger Pingeon (FRA)	+ 4"
5	Giampaolo Cucchietti (ITA)	+ 12"
6	Jean-Claude Theillière (FRA)	+ 30"
7	Maurice Izier (FRA)	+ 40"
8	Roland Berland (FRA)	+ 43"
9	Gilbert Bellone (FRA)	+ 43"
10	Leif Mortensen (DEN)	+ 1' 05"
