= Giro del Friuli =

Race details
- Date: Early-March
- Region: Friuli-Venezia Giulia
- Discipline: Road
- Competition: UCI Europe Tour
- Type: Single-day
- Web site: www.girodelfriuliprofessionisti.it

History
- First edition: 1974
- Editions: 32 (as of 2011)
- First winner: Luciano Borgognoni (ITA)
- Most wins: Guido Bontempi (ITA) (3 wins)
- Most recent: José Serpa (COL)

Giro del Friuli is a road bicycle race held annually in Friuli-Venezia Giulia, Italy. The first edition took place in 1974. From 2005 to 2008 the race was suspended, but it returned in 2009 as a 1.1 event on the UCI Europe Tour.

== Winners ==
| Year | Country | Rider | Team |
|---|---|---|---|
| 1974 | Italy | Luciano Borgognoni | Dreherforte |
| 1975 | Italy | Roberto Poggiali | Filotex |
| 1976 | Italy | Franco Bitossi | Zonca–Santini |
| 1977 | Italy | Giuseppe Saronni | Scic |
| 1978 | Belgium | Roger De Vlaeminck | Sanson |
| 1979 | Italy | Francesco Moser | Sanson |
| 1980 | Italy | Claudio Corti | San Giacomo |
| 1981 | Italy | Wladimiro Panizza | Gis Gelati–Campagnolo |
| 1982 | Italy | Guido Bontempi | Inoxpran |
| 1983 | Italy | Francesco Moser | Gis Gelati |
| 1984 | Italy | Claudio Corti | Sammontana |
| 1985 | Italy | Franco Chioccioli | Fanini–Wührer |
| 1986 | Italy | Gianni Bugno | Atala–Ofmega |
| 1987 | Italy | Guido Bontempi | Carrera Jeans–Vagabond |
| 1988 | Italy | Guido Bontempi | Carrera Jeans–Vagabond |
| 1989 | Poland | Lech Piasecki | Malvor–Sidi |
| 1990 | Venezuela | Leonardo Sierra | Selle Italia–Eurocar–Mosoca |
| 1991 | Italy | Gianni Bugno | Chateau d'Ax–Gatorade |
| 1992 | Italy | Alessandro Giannelli | Carrera |
| 1993 | Latvia | Piotr Ugrumov | Mecair–Ballan |
| 1994 | Ukraine | Vladimir Pulnikov | Carrera Jeans–Tassoni |
| 1995 | Russia | Dmitri Konychev | Aki–Gipiemme |
| 1996 | Kazakhstan | Andrei Teteriouk | Aki–Gipiemme |
| 1997 | No race | | |
| 1998 | Italy | Francesco Arazzi | Ros Mary–Amica Chips |
| 1999 | Italy | Davide Rebellin | Polti |
| 2000 | No race | | |
| 2001 | Italy | Denis Lunghi | Colpack–Astro |
| 2002 | Italy | Franco Pellizotti | Alessio |
| 2003 | Spain | Joseba Albizu | Mercatone Uno–Scanavino |
| 2004 | Italy | Michele Gobbi | De Nardi |
| 2005–2008 | No race | | |
| 2009 | Italy | Mirco Lorenzetto | Lampre–NGC |
| 2010 | Italy | Roberto Ferrari | De Rosa–Stac Plastic |
| 2011 | Colombia | José Serpa | Androni Giocattoli |
| 2012–2013 | No race | | |
