= Claudio Corti (cyclist) =

Italian cyclist

Personal information
- Born: 1 March 1955 (age 71) Bergamo, Italy

Cycling career
- Sport: Cycling
- Discipline: Road
- Role: Rider, team manager

Professional teams
- 1978–1979: Zonca-Santini
- 1980: San Giacomo
- 1981–1984: Sammontana
- 1985–1987: Supermercati Brianzoli
- 1988–1989: Chateau d'Ax

Managerial teams
- 1990-1992: Chateau d'Ax
- 1993: Gatorade-Mega Drive
- 1994: Team Polti
- 1997–2004: Saeco–Estro
- 2005: Lampre–Caffita
- 2006–2009: Barloworld
- 2012–2015: Colombia–Coldeportes

Claudio Corti (born 1 March 1955 in Bergamo) is a former Italian cyclist. He became a team manager at the end of his career.

== Major results ==
1976
2nd Amateur National Road Race Championships
1977
1st UCI Amateur World Road Race Championships
1st Girobio
1st Stage 1 Grand Prix Guillaume Tell
2nd Overall Giro delle Regioni
2nd Overall Grand Prix Guillaume Tell
1980
1st Giro del Friuli
1984
1st Giro del Friuli
2nd UCI World Road Race Championships
3rd Coppa Sabatini
3rd Coppa Ugo Agostoni
3rd Giro del Veneto
3rd Memorial Nencini
1985
1st National Road Race Championships
1st Giro dell'Umbria
1st Giro della Romagna
1st Giro del Veneto
2nd Coppa Ugo Agostoni
2nd Giro dell'Emilia
3rd Trofeo Matteotti
1986
1st National Road Race Championships
1st Giro di Toscana
1st Gran Premio Città di Camaiore
2nd Coppa Bernocchi
2nd Giro del Friuli
2nd Milano–Vignola
5th Overall Giro d'Italia
1987
1st Overall Giro del Trentino

1st Stage 2

1988
1st Coppa Sabatini
