= Reybrouck =

Reybrouck is a Flemish surname. Notable people with the surname include:

- David Van Reybrouck (born 1971), Belgian cultural historian, archaeologist, and author
- Guido Reybrouck (born 1941), Belgian cyclist
- Wilfried Reybrouck (born 1953), Belgian cyclist, brother of Guido
