= Attilio Benfatto =

Italian cyclist (1943–2017)

Personal information
- Born: 11 March 1943 Caselle de' Ruffi, Italy
- Died: 5 April 2017 (aged 74) Mirano, Italy

Cycling career
- Sport: Cycling
- Discipline: Road
- Role: Rider

Professional teams
- 1966–1967: Salamini–Luxor TV
- 1968: Kelvinator
- 1969–1973: Scic
- 1974: Filcas
- 1975: Wega–G.B.C.
- 1976: Soldati
- 1977: Bianchi–Campagnolo

Major wins
- Grand Tours Giro d'Italia 2 individual stages (1969, 1972)
Medal record
Representing Italy
World Championships
Bronze medal – third place	1966 Nürburgring	Team time trial

Attilio Benfatto (11 March 1943, in Caselle de' Ruffi – 5 April 2017, in Mirano) was an Italian professional road cyclist. He most notably won two stages of the Giro d'Italia. Throughout his career, he competed in eight editions of the Giro d'Italia and two editions of the Tour de France. His best placing was 25th overall in the 1969 Giro d'Italia.

== Major results ==
1966
1st Stage 3 Peace Race
1st Stage 4 Tour de l'Avenir
3rd Team time trial, UCI Road World Championships
1968
5th Coppa Sabatini
1969
1st Stage 23 Giro d'Italia
1971
10th Liège–Bastogne–Liège
1972
1st Stage 8 Giro d'Italia
1973
10th Overall Giro di Puglia
