= Mario Anni =

Italian cyclist

Personal information
- Born: 22 November 1943 (age 82)

Cycling career
- Sport: Cycling
- Role: Rider

Mario Anni (born 22 November 1943) is an Italian former racing cyclist. He rode in the 1970 Tour de France.
