= Francis Ducreux =

French cyclist (1945–2021)

Personal information
- Born: 14 February 1945
- Died: 1 May 2021 (aged 76)

Cycling career
- Sport: Cycling
- Role: Rider

Francis Ducreux (14 February 1945 – 1 May 2021) was a French racing cyclist. He rode in the 1968 Tour de France and 1971 Tour de France.
