= Sammontana (cycling team, 1973–1974) =

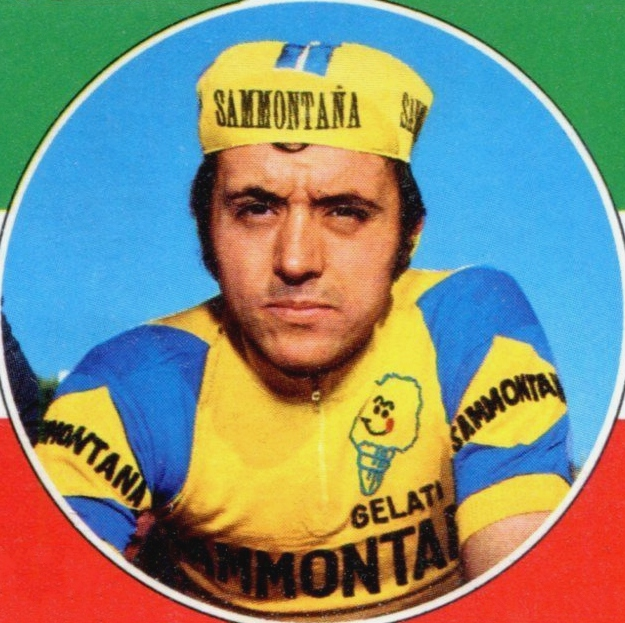
- Walter Riccomi, 1973

Team information
- Registered: Italy
- Founded: 1973
- Disbanded: 1974
- Discipline: Road

Key personnel
- Team managers: Piero Bini; Alfredo Martini

Team name history
- 1973–1974: Sammontana

Sammontana was an Italian professional cycling team that existed from 1973 to 1974. The team's main sponsor was ice cream manufacturer Sammontana.

== Major wins ==
1973
Giro dell'Emilia, Franco Bitossi
Coppa Sabatini, Mauro Simonetti
Giro del Veneto, Franco Bitossi
1974
Coppa Sabatini, Wilmo Francioni
À travers Lausanne, Giuseppe Perletto
Gran Premio Industria e Commercio di Prato, Fabrizio Fabbri
Giro di Puglia, Fabrizio Fabbri
Stage 14 Giro d'Italia, Giuseppe Perletto
