= Coppa Sabatini =

Italian one-day road cycling race

Race details
- Date: Early-October
- Region: Tuscany, Italy
- English name: Sabatini Cup
- Local name: Coppa Sabatini (in Italian)
- Discipline: Road
- Competition: UCI Europe Tour; UCI ProSeries
- Type: Single-day
- Web site: www.girodellatoscana.com

History
- First edition: 1952
- Editions: 74 (as of 2026)
- First winner: Primo Volpi (ITA)
- Most wins: 2 wins: Primo Volpi (ITA); Rino Benedetti (ITA); Dino Bruni (ITA); Franco Bitossi (ITA); Moreno Argentin (ITA); Maurizio Fondriest (ITA); Dmitri Konyshev (RUS); Giovanni Visconti (ITA); Sonny Colbrelli (ITA); Marc Hirschi (SUI)
- Most recent: Benoît Cosnefroy (FRA)

The Coppa Sabatini is a late season road bicycle race held annually in Province of Pisa, Italy. From 2005 to 2019, the race was organised as a 1.1 event on the UCI Europe Tour. In 2020, it was added to the UCI ProSeries, upgrading its classification to 1.Pro.

== Winners ==
Year	Country	Rider	Team
1952	Italy	Primo Volpi	Arbos-Pirelli
1953	Italy	Primo Volpi	Arbos
1954	Italy	Rino Benedetti	Legnano
1955	Italy	Angelo Miserocchi	amateur
1956	Italy	Idrio Bui	amateur
1957	Italy	Gianbattista Gabelli	Girardengo-E.R.G.
1958	Italy	Giuseppe Pardini	amateur
1959	Italy	Rino Benedetti	Ghigi-Ganna
1960	Italy	Graziano Battistini	Legnano
1961	Italy	Dino Bruni	Ignis
1962	Italy	Alfredo Sabbadin	Gazzola-Fiorelli
1963	Italy	Dino Bruni	Gazzola
1964	Italy	Italo Zilioli	Carpano
1965	Italy	Luciano Armani	Bianchi-Mobylette
1966	Italy	Franco Bitossi	Filotex
1967	Italy	Michele Dancelli	Vittadello
1968	Italy	Franco Bitossi	Filotex
1969	Italy	Romano Tumellero	Ferretti
1970	Sweden	Gösta Pettersson	Ferretti
1971	Italy	Roberto Poggiali	Salvarani
1972	Belgium	Tony Houbrechts	Salvarani
1973	Italy	Mauro Simonetti	Sammontana
1974	Italy	Wilmo Francioni	Sammontana
1975	Italy	Giovanni Battaglin	Jollj Ceramica
1976	Italy	Piero Spinelli	Zonca-Santini
1977	No race		
1978	Italy	Francesco Moser	Sanson
1979	Italy	Leonardo Mazzantini	Zonca-Santini
1980	Italy	Gianbattista Baronchelli	Bianchi-Piaggio
1981	Italy	Claudio Bortolotto	Santini-Selle Italia
1982	Italy	Giuseppe Saronni	Del Tongo-Colnago
1983	Italy	Moreno Argentin	Sammontana-Campagnolo
1984	Italy	Silvano Contini	Bianchi-Piaggio
1985	Italy	Marino Amadori	Alpilatte-Cierre
1986	France	Jean-François Bernard	La Vie Claire
1987	Italy	Gianni Bugno	Atala-Ofmega
1988	Italy	Claudio Corti	Château d'Ax
1989	Italy	Maurizio Fondriest	Del Tongo
1990	Italy	Moreno Argentin	Ariostea
1991	Italy	Franco Chioccioli	Del Tongo-MG Boys
1992	Italy	Stefano Zanini	Italbonifica–Navigare
1993	Italy	Claudio Chiappucci	Carrera Jeans–Tassoni
1994	Italy	Maurizio Fondriest	Lampre–Panaria
1995	Italy	Davide Cassani	MG Maglificio–Technogym
1996	Denmark	Bjarne Riis	Team Telekom
1997	Italy	Andrea Tafi	Mapei–GB
1998	France	Emmanuel Magnien	Française des Jeux
1999	Russia	Dmitri Konyshev	Mercatone Uno–Bianchi
2000	Belgium	Andrei Tchmil	Lotto–Adecco
2001	Russia	Dmitri Konyshev	Fassa Bortolo
2002	Italy	Paolo Bettini	Mapei–Quick-Step
2003	Italy	Paolo Bossoni	Vini Caldirola–So.di
2004	Germany	Jan Ullrich	T-Mobile Team
2005	Italy	Alessandro Bertolini	Domina Vacanze
2006	Italy	Giovanni Visconti	Team Milram
2007	Italy	Giovanni Visconti	Quick-Step–Innergetic
2008	Ukraine	Mikhaylo Khalilov	Ceramica Flaminia–Bossini Docce
2009	Belgium	Philippe Gilbert	Silence–Lotto
2010	Italy	Riccardo Riccò	Vacansoleil
2011	Italy	Enrico Battaglin	Colnago–CSF Inox
2012	Colombia	Fabio Duarte	Colombia–Coldeportes
2013	Italy	Diego Ulissi	Lampre–Merida
2014	Italy	Sonny Colbrelli	Bardiani–CSF
2015	Spain	Eduard Prades	Caja Rural–Seguros RGA
2016	Italy	Sonny Colbrelli	Bardiani–CSF
2017	Italy	Andrea Pasqualon	Wanty–Groupe Gobert
2018	Spain	Juan José Lobato	Nippo–Vini Fantini–Europa Ovini
2019	Kazakhstan	Alexey Lutsenko	Astana
2020	New Zealand	Dion Smith	Mitchelton–Scott
2021	Denmark	Michael Valgren	EF Education–Nippo
2022	Colombia	Daniel Martínez	INEOS Grenadiers
2023	Switzerland	Marc Hirschi	UAE Team Emirates
2024	Switzerland	Marc Hirschi	UAE Team Emirates
2025	Mexico	Isaac Del Toro	UAE Team Emirates XRG
2026	France	Benoît Cosnefroy	UAE Team Emirates XRG
