= Enzo Brentegani =

Italian cyclist

Personal information
- Full name: Enzo Brentegani
- Born: 18 March 1948 (age 78) Italy

Cycling career
- Sport: Cycling
- Current team: Retired
- Discipline: Road
- Role: Rider

Professional team
- 1973–1974: Jollj Ceramica

Enzo Brentegani (born 18 March 1948) is a retired Italian racing cyclist. He rode in two editions of the Giro d'Italia in his career, finishing 81st in 1973 and pulling out after the third stage in 1974.

== Major results ==
1971
1st Trofeo Città di San Vendemiano
3rd Trofeo Alcide Degasperi
1972
5th Overall Tour de l'Avenir

=== Grand Tour general classification results timeline ===
Grand Tour	1973	1974
Vuelta a España	Did not Race	
Giro d'Italia	81	DNF
Tour de France	Did not Race	

Legend
—	Did not compete
DNF	Did not finish
