= Emmanuele Bergamo =

Italian cyclist

Personal information
- Born: 12 August 1949 (age 77) Ponte di Piave

Cycling career
- Sport: Cycling
- Role: Rider

Emmanuele Bergamo (born 12 August 1949) is an Italian racing cyclist. He rode in the 1975 Tour de France.
