= Franco Ongarato =

Italian cyclist (born 1949)

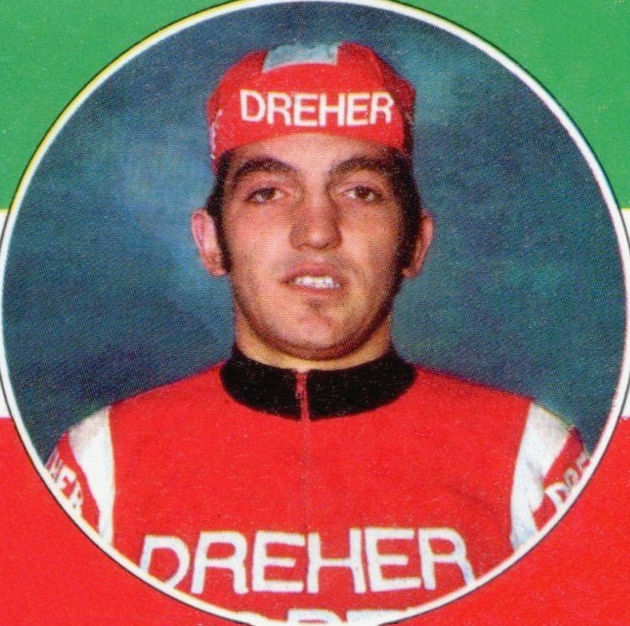
- Ongarato in 1973

Personal information
- Born: 29 May 1949 (age 77) Padua, Italy
- Height: 175 cm (5 ft 9 in)
- Weight: 73 kg (161 lb)

Cycling career
- Sport: Cycling

Franco Ongarato (born 29 May 1949) is a former Italian road cyclist. As an amateur he competed at the 1972 Olympics, and won two stages of the Tour of Bulgaria in 1970 and one stage of the Tour de l'Avenir in 1972. In 1973–74 he rode professionally and took part in the 1973 Giro d'Italia, placing third in stage 9.
