= Giovanni Dalla Bona =

Italian cyclist

Personal information
- Born: 21 September 1951 (age 75)

Cycling career
- Sport: Cycling
- Role: Rider

Giovanni Dalla Bona (born 21 September 1951) is an Italian racing cyclist. He rode in the 1975 Tour de France.
