= Simone Fraccaro =

Italian cyclist

Personal information
- Born: 1 January 1952 (age 74) Riese Pio X, Italy

Cycling career
- Sport: Cycling
- Role: Rider

Simone Fraccaro (born 1 January 1952) is an Italian former professional racing cyclist. He rode in three editions of the Tour de France and eight editions of the Giro d'Italia.
