= Filcas (cycling team) =

Italian cycling team

Team information
- Registered: Italy
- Founded: 1974
- Disbanded: 1974
- Discipline: Road

Key personnel
- Team manager: Remigio Zanatta

Team name history
- 1974: Filcas

Filcas was an Italian professional cycling team that existed only for the 1974 season. The team competed in the 1969 Giro d'Italia, with rider Wilfried Reybrouck winning stage one after attacking the field with 400 metres to go.
