= Aldo Parecchini =

Italian cyclist

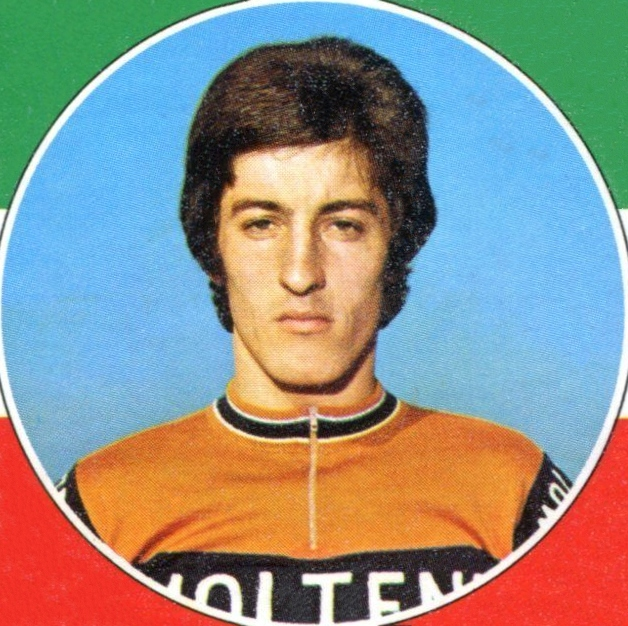
- Parecchini in 1973

Personal information
- Full name: Aldo Parecchini
- Born: 21 December 1950 (age 75) Nave, Italy
- Height: 173 cm (5 ft 8 in)
- Weight: 71 kg (157 lb)

Cycling career
- Sport: Cycling
- Current team: Retired
- Discipline: Road
- Role: Rider

Major wins
- 1 stage 1976 Tour de France

Aldo Parecchini (born 21 December 1950) is a retired Italian road bicycle racer. As an amateur he competed in the individual road race at the 1972 Summer Olympics. Between 1973 and 1980 he rode professionally and rode the Tour de France in 1974 and 1976; in 1976 he won stage 6.

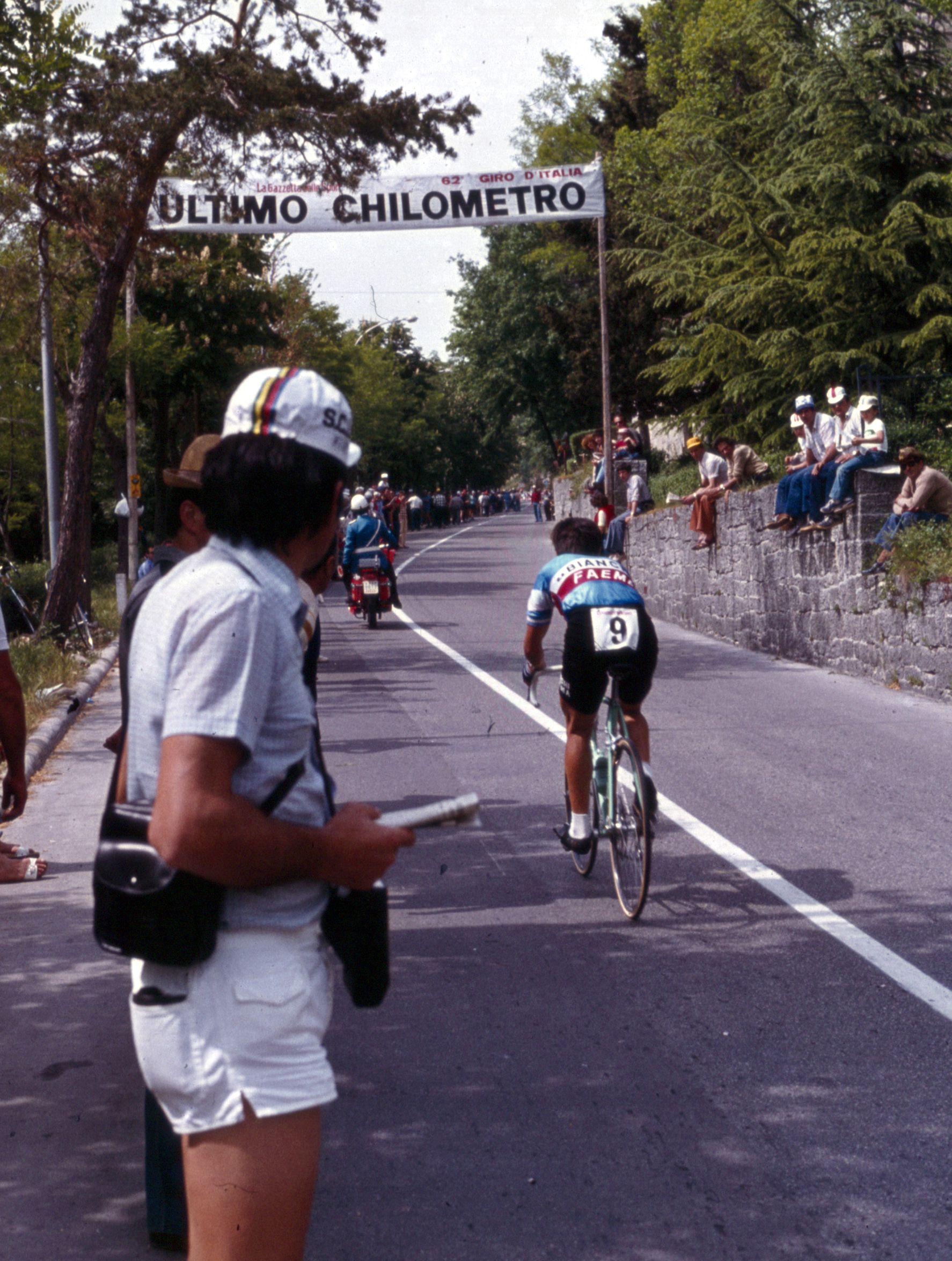
Aldo Parecchini, Giro d'Italia 1979

== Major results ==
1972
Milano – Busseto
1976
Tour de France:

Winner stage 6

1977
Pietra Ligure
