= Wladimiro Panizza =

Italian cyclist (1945–2002)

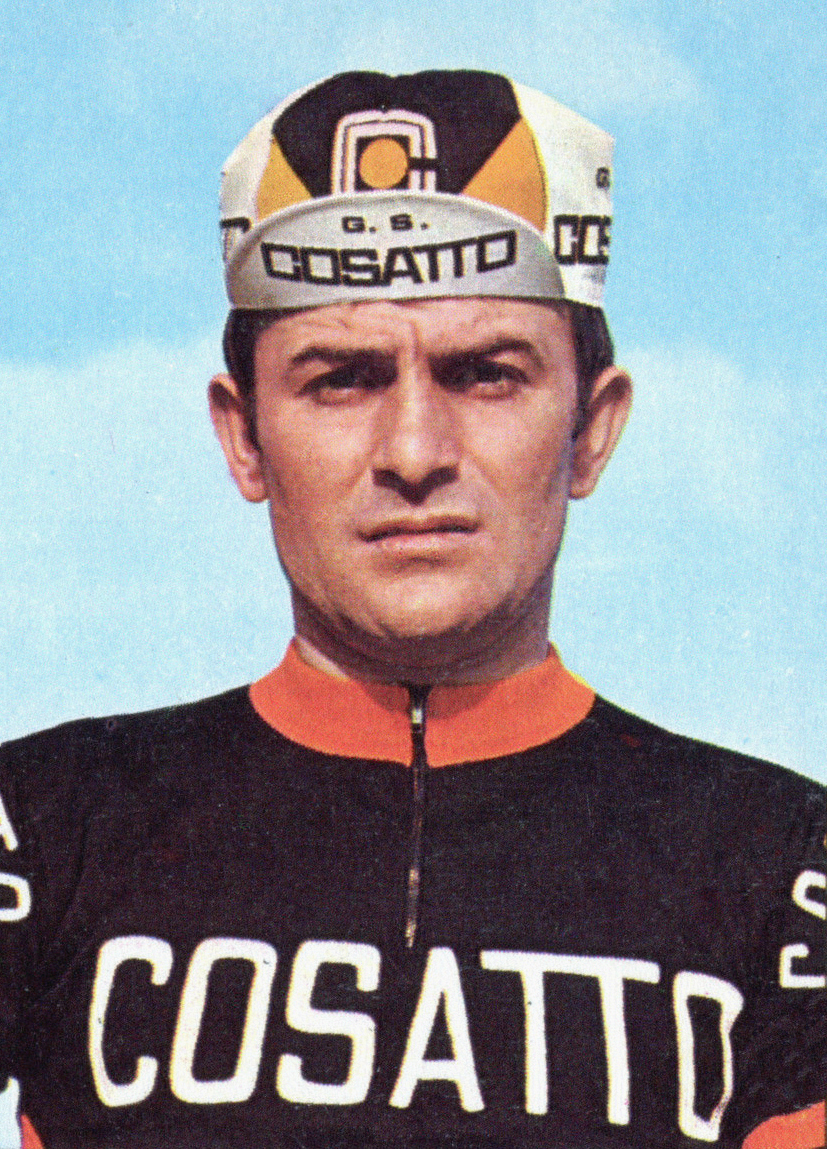
- Panizza in 1971

Personal information
- Full name: Wladimiro Panizza
- Born: 5 June 1945 Fagnano Olona, Italy
- Died: 21 June 2002 (aged 57) Cassano Magnago, Italy

Cycling career
- Sport: Cycling
- Discipline: Road
- Role: Rider
- Rider type: Climber

Amateur team
- 1965–1966: VC Bustese

Professional teams
- 1967–1968: Vittadello
- 1969–1970: Salvarani
- 1971: Cosatto–Marsicano
- 1972: Zonca
- 1973: G.B.C.–Sony–Furzi
- 1974–1975: Brooklyn
- 1976–1977: Scic
- 1978: Vibor
- 1978: Sanson–Campagnolo
- 1980–1981: Gis Gelati
- 1982: Del Tongo
- 1983–1984: Atala
- 1985: Ariostea–Oece

Major wins
- 2 stages Giro d'Italia; 1 stage Tour de France; Grand Prix du Midi Libre (1977)

Wladimiro Panizza (5 June 1945 – 21 June 2002) was an Italian professional road bicycle racer. Panizza came from a Communist family and was named after Lenin. During his long career (1967–1985), he helped Felice Gimondi and Franco Bitossi. His best grand tour was the 1980 Giro d'Italia, where he placed second in the overall classification. He holds the record for number of starts and number of completions in the Giro, completing the race 16 times out of 18 starts.

== Major results ==
1967
1st GP Montelupo
1st GP Hiussano
1st GP Valsassina
1st GP Robbiano
4th Giro di Lombardia
1968
2nd Coppa Sabatini
3rd Gran Premio Industria e Commercio di Prato
1969
3rd Giro di Campania
1970
1st GP Monaco
2nd Tour du Haut Var
9th Overall Tour de Romandie
1971
3rd Trofeo Laigueglia
5th Overall Tour de Romandie
9th Overall Giro d'Italia
1972
3rd GP Montelupo
3rd Giro del Piemonte
3rd Gran Premio Città di Camaiore
5th Overall Giro d'Italia
1973
1st Giro della Provincia di Reggio Calabria
1st Giro della Romagna
3rd Overall Tour de Suisse
3rd Giro del Veneto
5th Overall Volta a Catalunya

1st Stage 4b

6th Overall Giro d'Italia
1974
2nd Giro di Campania
2nd Overall Tour de Romandie

1st Stage 1

3rd Overall A Travers Lausanne
4th Overall Tour de France
4th Liège–Bastogne–Liège
1975
1st National Cyclo-cross Championships
1st Milano–Torino
2nd Giro di Campania
3rd Overall Tirreno–Adriatico
3rd Giro del Veneto
6th Overall Giro d'Italia:

1st Stage 17b

8th Giro di Lombardia
10th Liège–Bastogne–Liège
1976
1st National Cyclo-cross Championships
1st Stage 15 Tour de France
1st Stage 1 Giro di Sardegna
2nd Milan–San Remo
3rd Giro di Lombardia
3rd National Road Race Championships
6th Overall Giro d'Italia
1977
1st Grand Prix du Midi Libre
2nd Coppa Bernocchi
2nd Trittico Lombardo
3rd Giro dell'Appennino
5th Overall Giro d'Italia
5th Giro di Lombardia
1978
2nd Giro di Campania
2nd Giro dell'Emilia
2nd Trofeo Pantalica
2nd Trittico Lombardo
3rd Giro di Puglia
3rd Coppa Bernocchi
4th Overall Giro d'Italia

1st Stage 17

4th Giro di Lombardia
1979
1st Stage 1 Tirreno–Adriatico
2nd Gran Premio Industria e Commercio di Prato
2nd Giro del Piemonte
3rd Milano–Torino
3rd Giro della Provincia di Reggio Calabria
8th Overall Tour de Romandie
1980
1st Stage 1 Tour de Romandie
1st Giro della Provincia di Siracusa
2nd Overall Giro d'Italia
2nd Giro del Piemonte
2nd Coppa Agostoni
2nd Coppa Placci
2nd Giro dell'Emilia
3rd Overall Étoile de Bessèges
4th Road race, UCI World Road Championships
9th Giro di Lombardia
1981
1st Giro del Friuli
2nd National Road Race Championships
2nd Trofeo Pantalica
3rd Giro dell'Appennino
1982
1st Giro della Provincia di Siracusa
1st Trofeo dell'Etna
3rd Trofeo Laigueglia
3rd Giro di Campania
5th Züri-Metzgete
1983
3rd Giro dell'Appennino
10th Overall Giro d'Italia
1984
3rd Giro dell'Appennino

=== Grand Tour general classification results timeline ===
Grand Tour	1967	1968	1969	1970	1971	1972	1973	1974	1975	1976	1977	1978	1979	1980	1981	1982	1983	1984	1985
Giro d'Italia	22	—	16	DNF	9	5	6	12	6	6	5	4	13	2	DNF	20	10	11	28
Tour de France	—	—	14	18	—	—	—	4	—	13	—	—	—	—	—	—	—	—	—
Vuelta a España	DNF	—	—	—	—	—	—	—	—	—	—	—	—	—	—	—	—	—	

Legend
—	Did not compete
DNF	Did not finish
