= Dreherforte =

Cycling team (1973-1974)

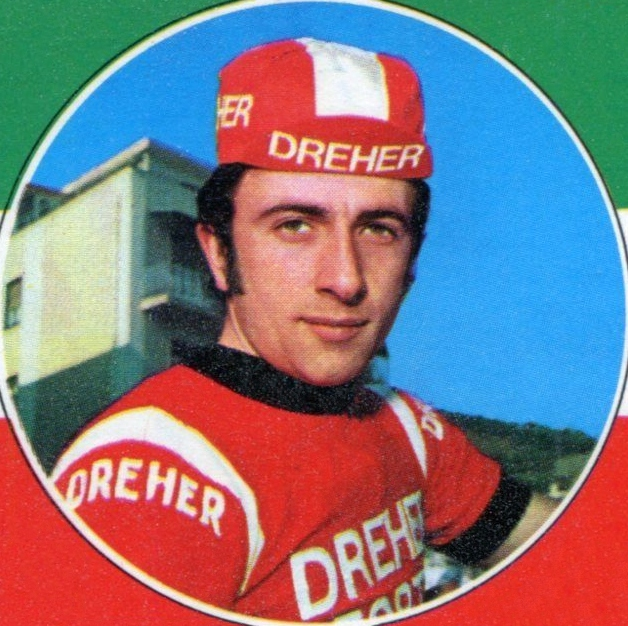
- Luciano Borgognoni, 1973

Team information
- Registered: Italy
- Founded: 1973
- Disbanded: 1974
- Discipline: Road

Key personnel
- Team manager: Luciano Pezzi

Team name history
- 1973–1974: Dreherforte

Dreherforte was an Italian professional cycling team that existed from 1973 to 1974.

== Major wins ==
1973
Stage 12 Giro d'Italia, Tullio Rossi
Coppa Placci, Italo Zilioli
Giro dell'Appennino, Italo Zilioli
1974
Giro del Friuli, Luciano Borgognoni
