= Sammontana =

Italian ice cream manufacturer

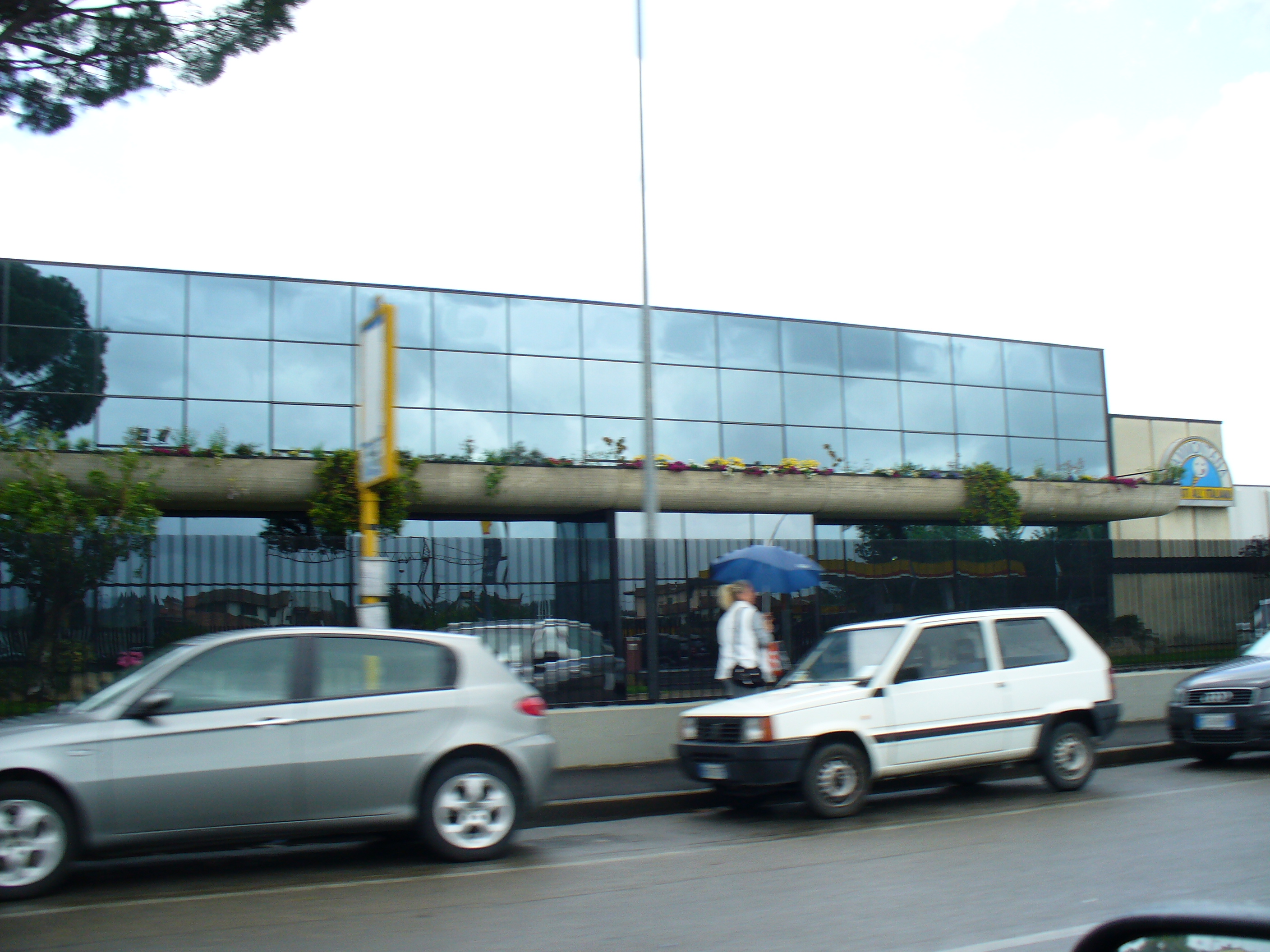
- Sammontana Factory in Empoli
- Type: Società per azioni
- Industry: Food processing
- Founded: 1948; 78 years ago
- Founder: Renzo Bagnoli
- Headquarters: Empoli, Italy
- Key people: Loriano Bagnoli (president); Marco Bagnoli (CEO); Leonardo Bagnoli (CEO)
- Products: Ice cream
- Revenue: €370 million (2018)
- Net income: €14.5 million (2018)
- Number of employees: 1,050
- Website: www.sammontana.it

Sammontana is an Italian ice cream manufacturer based in Empoli, Italy founded in 1948 when brothers Renzo, Sergio and Loriano Bagnoli started selling ice cream made in their father's bar outside of Empoli. As of 2008, Sammontana has a combined market share of 20% with its "Sammontana" (13%) and "Sanson" (7%) brands.

The company innovated in both the production and distribution of ice cream.

The logo of the company was drawn by the American graphic designer Milton Glaser.
