= Roberto Poggiali =

Italian cyclist (born 1941)

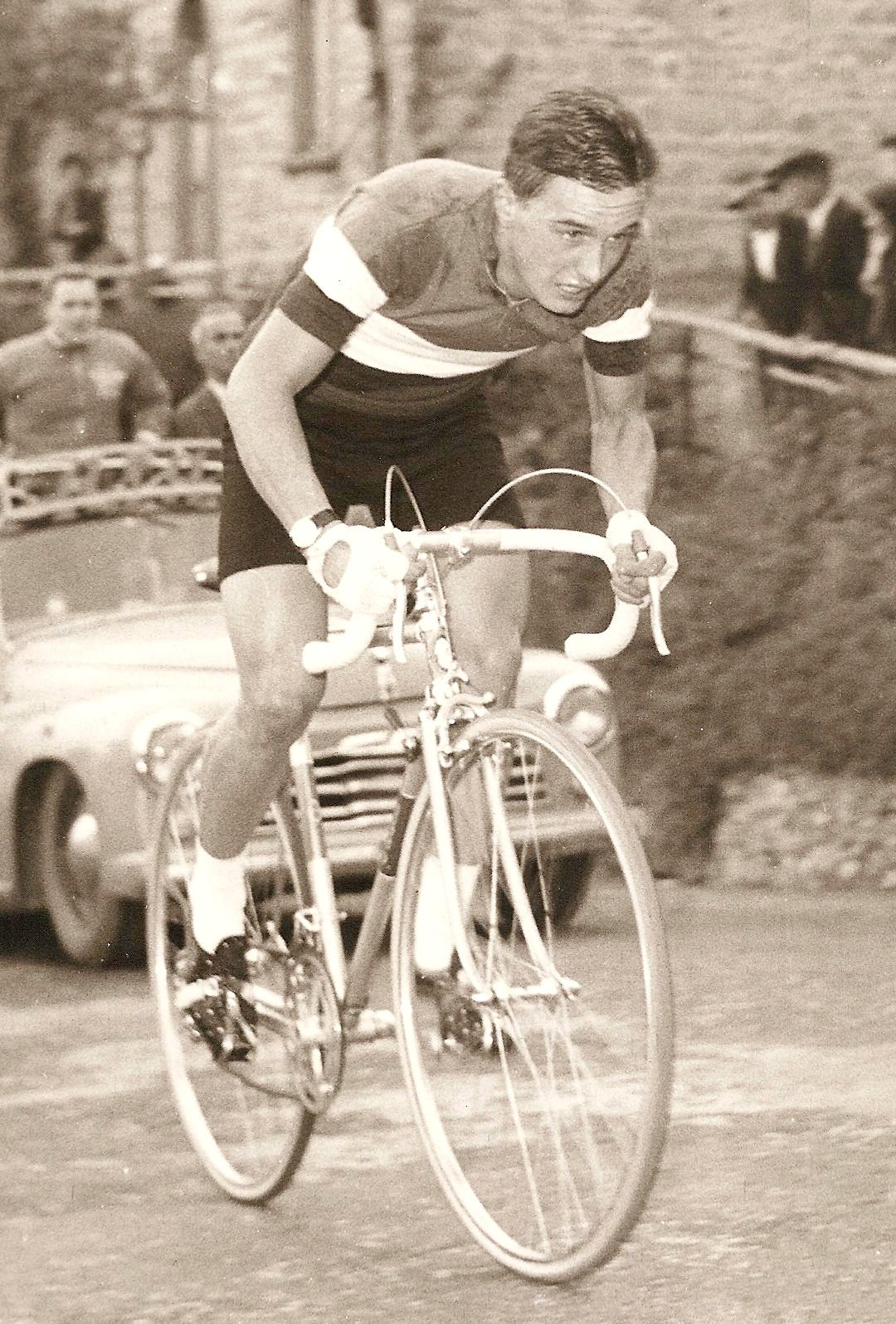
- Poggiali at the national championships in 1962

Personal information
- Full name: Roberto Poggiali
- Born: April 16, 1941 (age 85) Florence, Italy

Cycling career
- Sport: Cycling
- Discipline: Road
- Role: Rider

Professional teams
- 1963–1965: Ignis
- 1966: Bianchi–Mobylette
- 1967–1972: Salvarani
- 1973: Sammontana
- 1974–1977: Filotex
- 1978: Zonca-Santini

Major wins
- La Flèche Wallonne (1965); Tour de Suisse (1970); Coppa Sabatini (1971); GP de Cannes (1972); Giro del Lazio (1974); Giro del Friuli (1975); Giro dell'Umbria (1976)

Roberto Poggiali (born 16 April 1941) is a retired Italian road racing cyclist. As an amateur he won the national road championship and one stage of the Tour de l'Avenir in 1962. He then turned professional and won the 1970 Tour de Suisse. He also rode the Giro d'Italia in 1963–74 and 1976–78, with the best result of eighth place in 1965, and Tour de France in 1967, 1969 and 1975, finishing 22nd in 1975.
