= Tullio Rossi =

Italian cyclist (1948–2025)

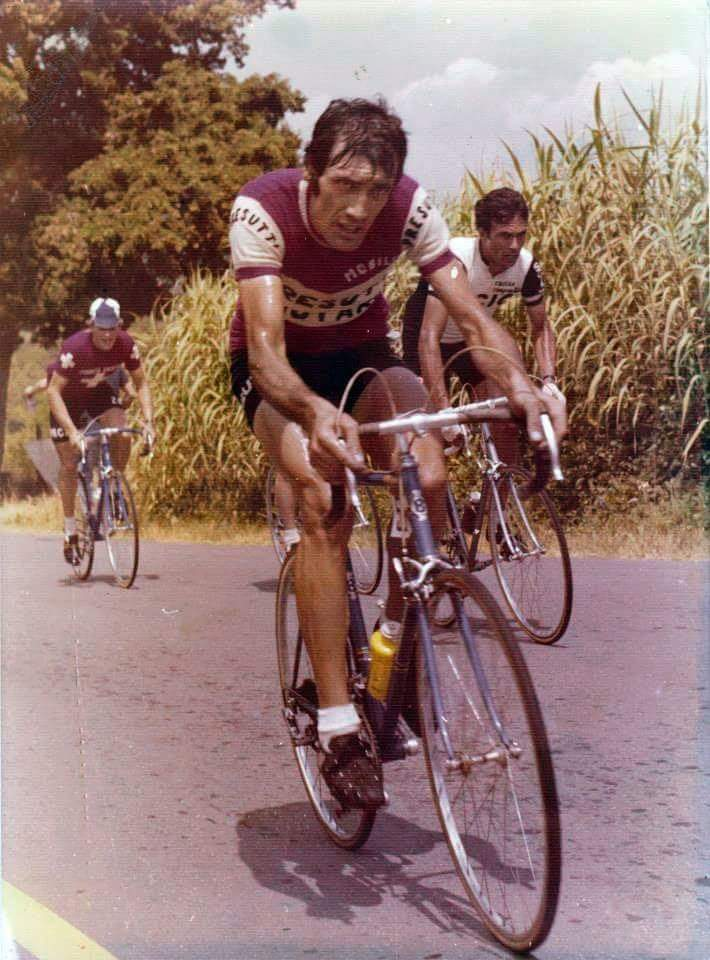
- Rossi in 1975

Personal information
- Born: 2 June 1948 Rome, Italy
- Died: 16 September 2025 (aged 77)

Cycling career
- Sport: Cycling
- Discipline: Road
- Role: Rider

Professional teams
- 1973–1974: Dreherforte
- 1975: Splendor–Struvay
- 1976: Furzi
- 1977–1978: Gewiss-Bianchi

Tullio Rossi (2 June 1948 – 16 September 2025) was an Italian cyclist.

Rossi died on 16 September 2025, at the age of 77.

== Major results ==
1972
2nd Gran Premio della Liberazione
1973
1st Stage 12 Giro d'Italia
