= Rokado (cycling team) =

Team information
- Registered: Germany
- Founded: 1972
- Disbanded: 1975
- Discipline: Road

Team name history
- 1972 1974 1974–1975: Rokado–Colders; Rokado–De Gribaldy; Rokado

Rokado was a German professional cycling team that existed from 1972 to 1975. A notable result was the points classification of the 1973 Tour de France with Herman Van Springel.
