= Mauro Simonetti =

Italian cyclist (born 1948)

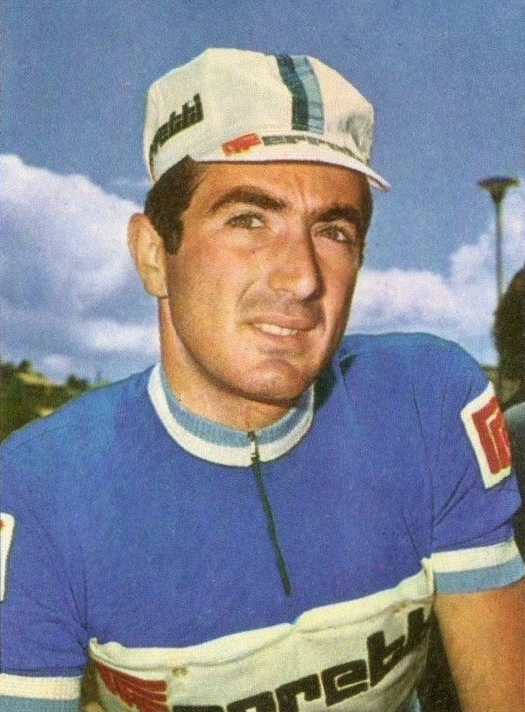
- Simonetti in 1971

Personal information
- Born: 14 July 1948 Livorno, Italy
- Height: 1.82 m (6 ft 0 in)
- Weight: 76 kg (168 lb)

Cycling career
- Sport: Cycling
- Discipline: Road
- Role: Rider

Major wins
- Bronze medal 1968 Olympic Games
Medal record
Representing Italy
Olympic Games
Bronze medal – third place	1968 Mexico City	Team road race

Mauro Simonetti (born 14 July 1948) was an Italian professional road bicycle racer. As an amateur he won a bronze medal in the team road race at the 1968 Olympics. After that he rode professionally between 1970 and 1979.

== Major results ==
1970
Gran Premio Città di Camaiore
1971
Tour de France:

Winner stage 6B

1972
Coppa Ugo Agostoni
1973
Coppa Sabatini
1974
San Michele – Agliana

== See also ==
- Italian medals in cycling at the Olympic Games
- Italy at the 1968 Summer Olympics
