= Santiago Lazcano =

Spanish cyclist (1947–1985)

Personal information
- Full name: Santiago Lazcano Labaca
- Born: 8 March 1947 Errezil, Spain
- Died: February 3, 1985 (aged 37) San Sebastián, Spain

Cycling career
- Sport: Cycling
- Discipline: Road
- Role: Rider

Professional teams
- 1969–1974: Kas–Kaskol
- 1975: Super Ser

Major wins
- Grand Tours Giro d'Italia 1 individual stage (1974)

Santiago Lazcano (8 March 1947 in Errezil – 3 February 1985 in San Sebastián) was a Spanish cyclist. He debuted as a professional in 1969 and rode both the Vuelta a España and Tour de France that year. He finished 10th overall in the 1972 Giro d'Italia and his best season was 1973 as he won the Spanish mountain championship, the Villafranca Grand Prix and took 5th overall in the 1973 Giro d'Italia. In 1974 he won stage 17, a high mountain stage in the Giro d'Italia and he finished 10th overall in the 1975 Vuelta a España. He retired as a pro cyclist in 1976 after an accident with a car at a race in The Netherlands. Following his retirement he occasionally commentated on the radio and on a regional TV show called 6 Hours of Euskadi. He died in a motorcycle accident close to his home in Azpeitia.

== Major results ==
1968
2nd Overall Vuelta a Cantabria
1969
1st Overall Vuelta a Cantabria
1972
1st GP Pascuas
2nd Giro dell'Emilia
2nd GP Vizcaya
1973
1st Prueba Villafranca de Ordizia
5th Overall Giro d'Italia
1974
1st Stage 7 Giro d'Italia
8th Overall Tour de Suisse
1975
1st Stage 2 Grand Prix du Midi Libre
3rd Subida a Arrate
3rd GP Vizcaya
1976
1st Overall Vuelta a Asturias
2nd Overall Vuelta a Cantabria

=== Grand Tour general classification results timeline ===
Grand Tour	1969	1970	1971	1972	1973	1974	1975	1976
Vuelta a España	40	—	—	19	—	20	9	22
Giro d'Italia	—	—	—	10	5	16	—	—
Tour de France	41	—	—	—	29	—	DNF	68
