= Jollj Ceramica =

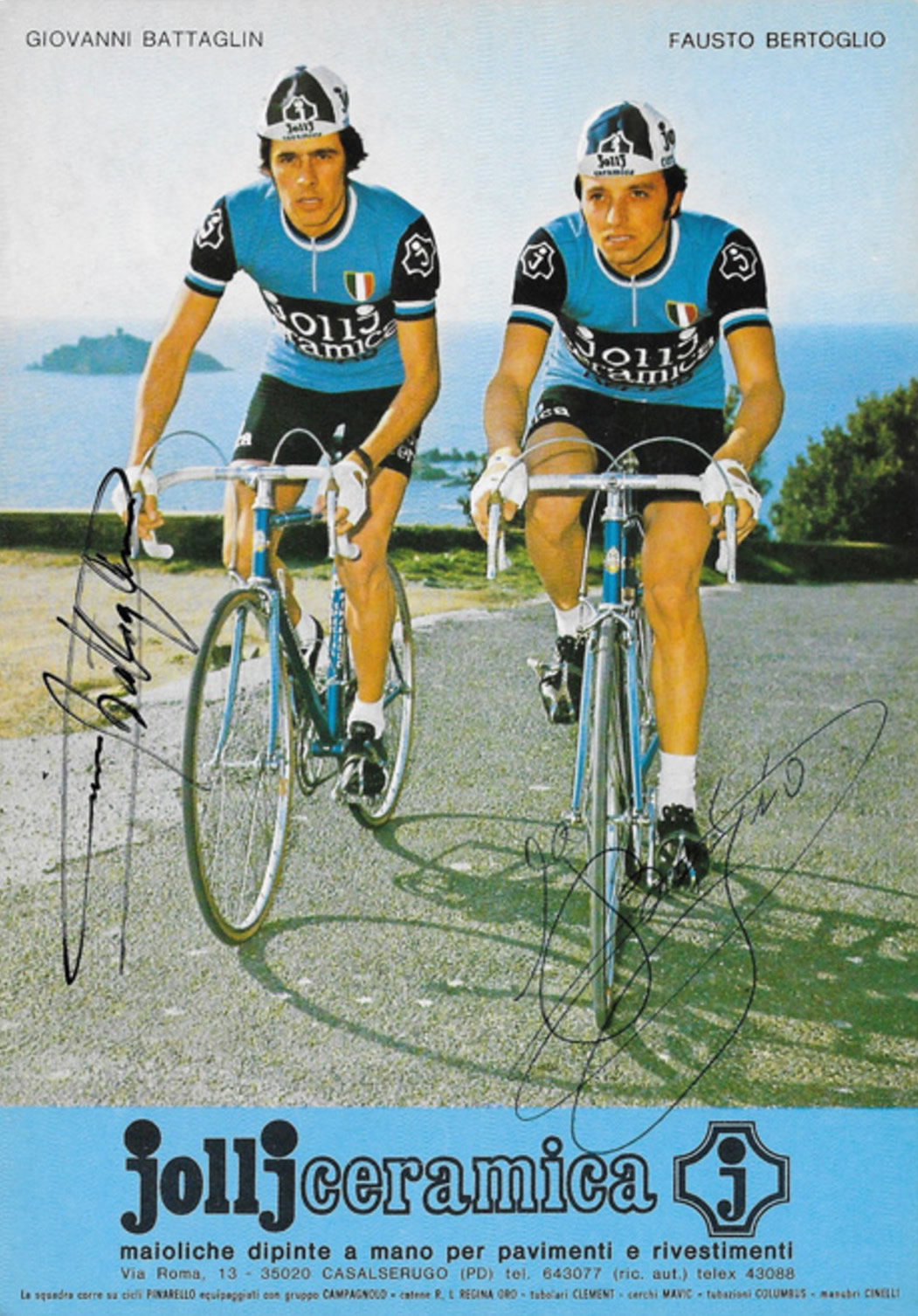
- Giovanni Battaglin and Fausto Bertoglio in 1976

Team information
- Registered: Italy
- Founded: 1973
- Disbanded: 1977
- Discipline: Road

Team name history
- 1973–1975 1976 1977: Jollj Ceramica; Jollj Ceramica–Decor; Jollj Ceramica

Jollj Ceramica was an Italian professional cycling team that existed from 1973 to 1977. Fausto Bertoglio won the general classification of the 1975 Giro d'Italia with team.

== Major results ==
1974
Stage 5b Tour de Romandie, Knut Knudsen
Stage 5 Giro d'Italia, Pierino Gavazzi
Colbordolo Criterium, Giovanni Battaglin
Morrovalle Criterium, Giovanni Battaglin
Giro dell'Appennino, Giovanni Battaglin

1975
Overall Giro d'Italia, Fausto Bertoglio

Stage 1, Knut Knudsen
Stages 3 & 13, Giovanni Battaglin
Stage 14, Fausto Bertoglio

UCI Track Cycling World Championships (Individual Sprint), John Nicholson
Coppa Sabatini, Giovanni Battaglin
Colbordolo Criterium, Giovanni Battaglin
Overall Volta a Catalunya, Fausto Bertoglio

Sprint classification, Alessio Antonini
Stages 1b, 3 & 7a, Pierino Gavazzi
Stage 5, Giovanni Battaglin
Stage 7b, Fausto Bertoglio

Calvisano Criterium, Fausto Bertoglio

1976
Stage 1 Tour de Romandie, Knut Knudsen
Stage 18 Giro d'Italia, Simone Fraccaro
Stage 2 Tour de France, Giovanni Battaglin
Overall Cronostaffetta, Pierino Gavazzi, Simone Fraccaro, Giovanni Battaglin, Knut Knudsen

Stage 1b Cronostaffetta, Knut Knudsen
Stage 1c, Simone Fraccaro, Giovanni Battaglin

Coppa Placci, Fausto Bertoglio
UCI Track Cycling World Championships (Individual Sprint), John Nicholson
Stage 4b Volta a Catalunya, Alfredo Chinetti
Stage 7a Volta a Catalunya, Fausto Bertoglio
Stage 7b Volta a Catalunya, Pierino Gavazzi

1977
Nord-West Schweizer Rundfahrt, Simone Fraccaro
Stage 4b Tour de Romandie, Knut Knudsen
Stage 3 Giro d'Italia, Simone Fraccaro
Stage 9 Giro d'Italia, Knut Knudsen
Stage 16b Giro d'Italia, Pierino Gavazzi
GP Montelupo, Giovanni Battaglin
