= Molteni (cycling team) =

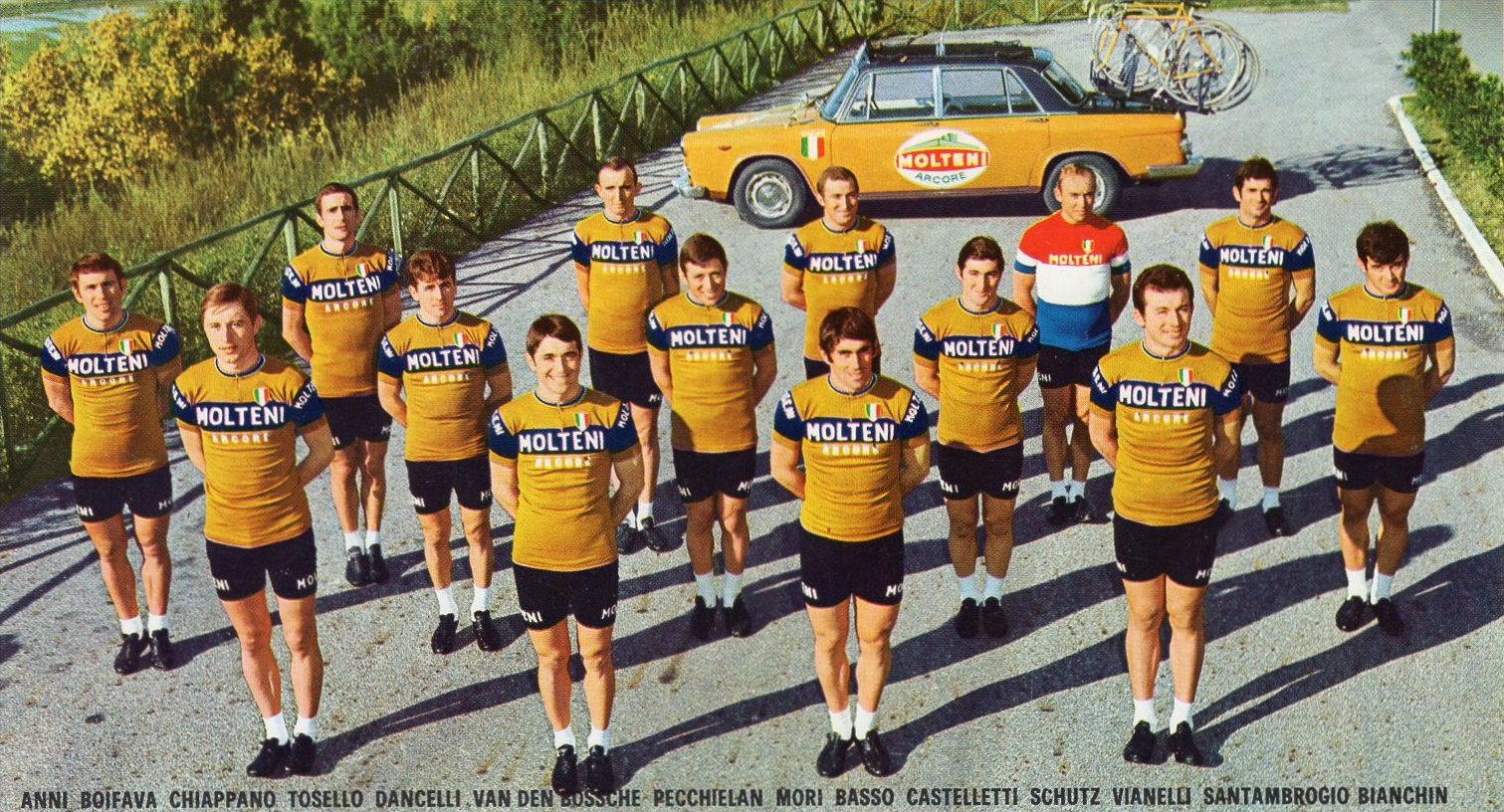
- The Molteni team of 1970

Team information
- Registered: Italy
- Founded: 1958
- Disbanded: 1976
- Discipline: Road

Team name history
- 1958–1974 1975 1976: Molteni; Molteni–RYC; Molteni–Campagnolo
Molteni jersey
Jersey

Molteni was an Italian professional road bicycle racing team from 1958 until the end of 1976. It won 663 races, many of them earned by its most famous rider, Eddy Merckx. Other riders included Gianni Motta and Marino Basso, who contributed 48 and 34 wins respectively. The Molteni family continues in cycling with sponsorship of Salmilano.

The sponsors Molteni were Italian furniture manufacturers based in Arcore, near Milan.

== History ==
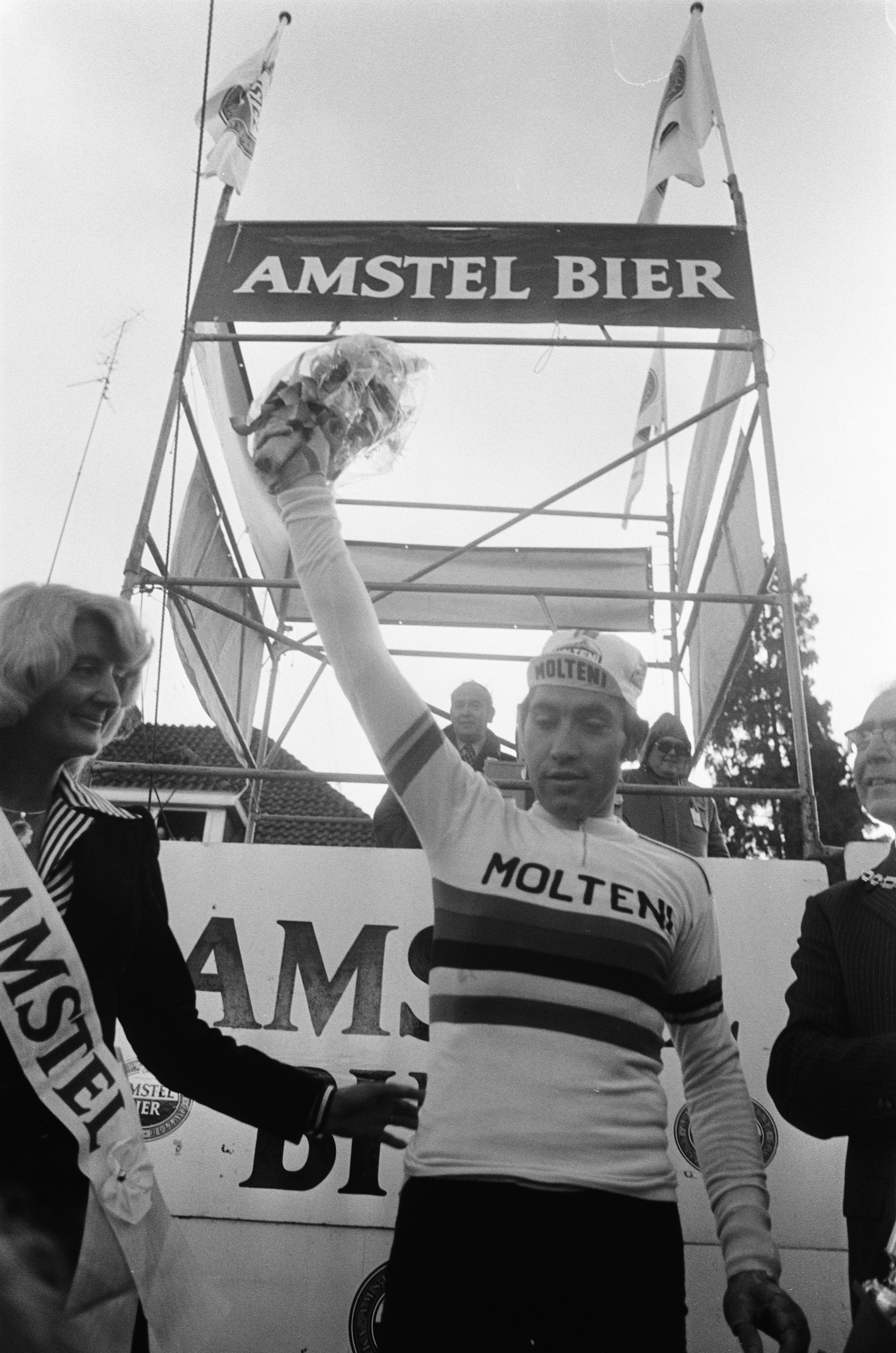
Eddy Merckx after he won the 1975 Amstel Gold Race, one of the many victories he achieved with Molteni

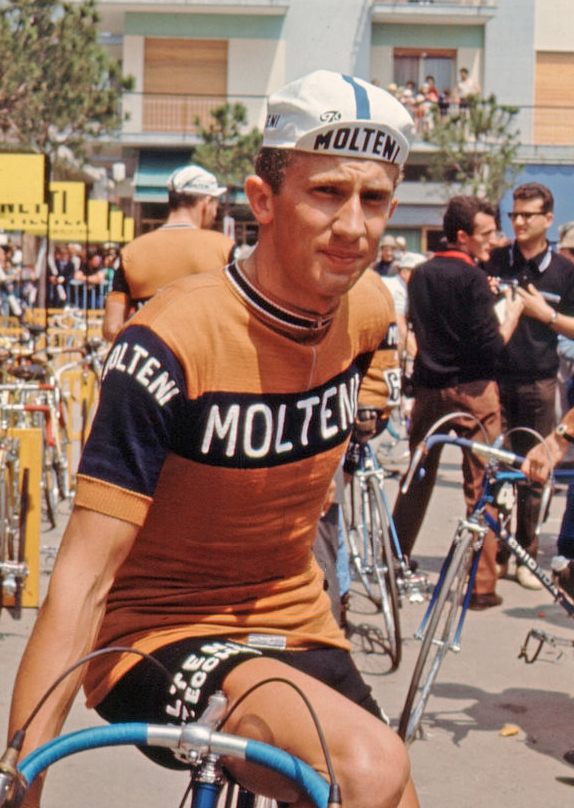
Gianni Motta at the 1966 Giro d'Italia

The Molteni team began in 1958 with Renato Molteni as team manager. It was started by Pietro Molteni. The team was also managed by his son, Ambrogio Molteni, a former professional rider. The former Italian road champion, Giorgio Albani, finished his career with Molteni in 1959 and came back two years later as directeur sportif. The team had success with Gianni Motta in the 1966 Giro d'Italia and Michele Dancelli in the classics. Merckx joined at the end of 1970, having twice won the Tour de France and two editions of the Giro d'Italia. Molteni became predominantly Belgian and took many of Merckx's teammates from Faemino–Faema, including his directeur sportif, Guillaume Driessens. Albani replaced Driessens and directed the team with Robert Lelangue from 1972 to 1976. Other directeurs sportifs included Marino Fontana. After 1976 Molteni retired from the peloton.

== Major wins ==
- Tour de France General classification 1971, 1972, 1974 (Merckx)
- Giro d'Italia General classification 1966 (Motta), 1972, 1973, 1974 (Merckx)
- Vuelta a España General classification 1973 (Merckx)
- World Championships road race 1966 (Rudi Altig) 1971 and 1974 (Merckx)
- Giro di Lombardia 1964, 1971, 1972
- Italy road race championships 1964, 1965, 1966, 1967
- Luxembourg road race championships 1968, 1969, 1970
- Belgium road race championships 1971
- Trofeo Baracchi 1964, 1972
- Tour de Romandie General classification 1966
- Tour de Suisse General classification 1967, 1974
- Tour de Luxembourg General classification 1968, 1969, 1970
- Paris–Luxembourg General classification 1968
- Milan–San Remo 1970, 1971, 1972, 1975, 1976
- Critérium du Dauphiné Libéré General classification 1971
- Liège–Bastogne–Liège 1971, 1972, 1973, 1975, 1976
- Omloop Het Volk 1971, 1973, 1974, 1975
- Rund um den Henninger-Turm 1971
- Tour of Belgium General classification 1971, 1972
- Paris-Nice General classification 1971 (Merckx)
- Grand Prix des Nations 1972, 1973
- E3 Prijs Vlaanderen 1973
- Amstel Gold Race 1973, 1975 (Merckx)
- Gent–Wevelgem 1973
- Paris–Brussels 1973
- Paris–Roubaix 1973
- Tour of Flanders 1975

== Notable riders ==
- Rudi Altig
- Peter Post
- Franco Balmamion
- Michele Dancelli
- Gianni Motta
- Marino Basso
- Eddy Merckx
- Herman Van Springel
- Roger Swerts
- Joseph Bruyère
