= Zonca (cycling team) =

Italian cycling team (1970-1979)

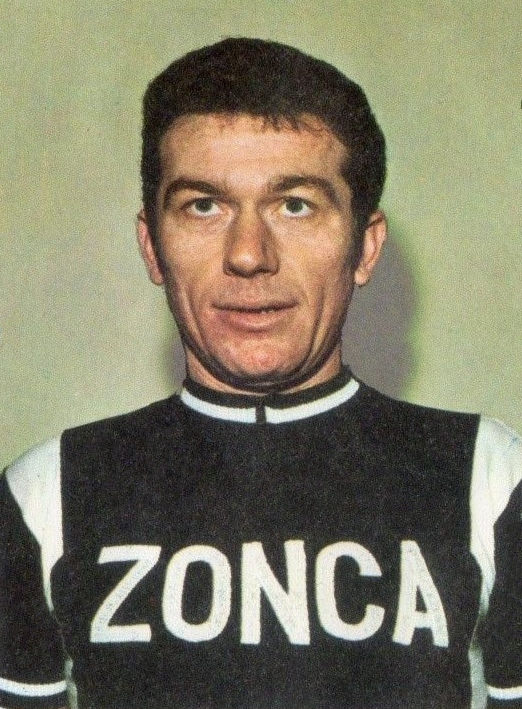
- Ambrogio Portalupi wearing the team's jersey in 1971

Team information
- Registered: Italy
- Founded: 1970
- Disbanded: 1979
- Discipline: Road

Key personnel
- Team manager: Ettore Milano

Team name history
- 1970–1974 1975–1979: Zonca; Zonca–Santini

Zonca was an Italian professional cycling team that existed from 1970 to 1979. It was founded by brothers Maffeo, Luigi and Giorgio Zonca.

The team was selected to race in eight editions of the Giro d'Italia, where they achieved four stage wins.

== Major victories ==
- Trofeo Matteotti : Davide Boifava (1972)
- Tour de Berne : Roland Salm (1974, 1975)
- Giro del Friuli : Franco Bitossi (1976)
- Coppa Sabatini : Piero Spinelli (1976), Leonardo Mazzantini (1979)
- Giro della Provincia di Reggio Calabria : Constantino Conti (1977)
- Milano–Torino : Pierino Gavazzi (1978)
- Giro di Campania : Pierino Gavazzi (1979)

=== Giro d'Italia results ===
  - 8 participations (1972–1979)
  - 4 stage wins:
    - 1, 1973 : Gianni Motta
    - 2, 1978 : Giancarlo Bellini, Pierino Gavazzi
    - 1, 1979 : Bruno Wolfer
  - 1 classification:
    - Mountains classification : Ueli Sutter (1978)
