= El Espinar =

- Municipality
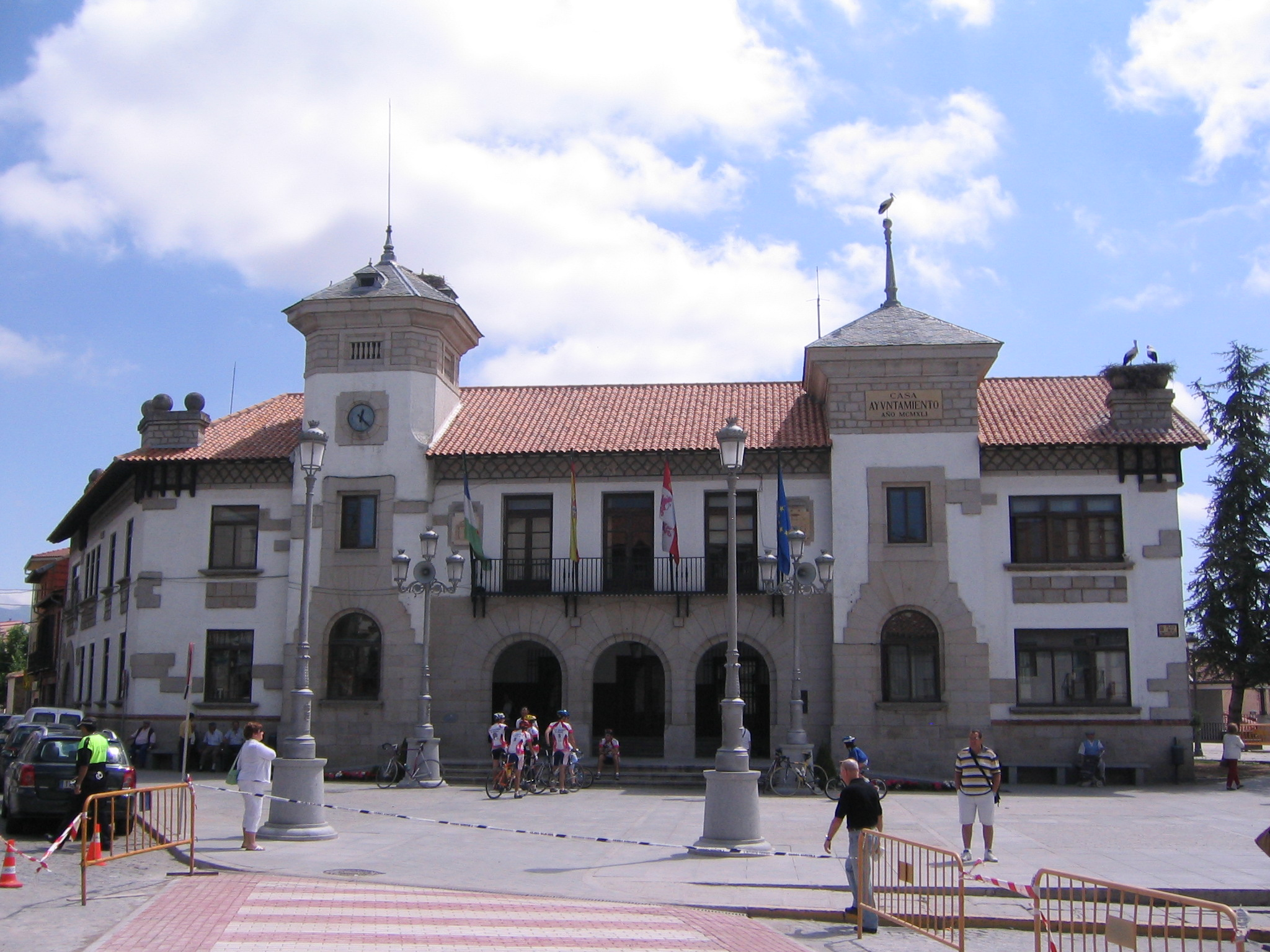

- Flag Coat of arms

- Location in Spain. El Espinar (Spain)
- Coordinates: 40°43′07″N 4°14′52″W
- Country: Spain
- Autonomous community: Castile and León
- Province: Segovia
- Municipality: El Espinar

Area
  - Total: 204 km^{2} (79 sq mi)

Population (2025-01-01)
  - Total: 10,409
  - Density: 51.0/km^{2} (132/sq mi)
- Time zone: UTC+1 (CET)
  - Summer (DST): UTC+2 (CEST)
- Website: Official website

El Espinar is a Spanish population centre and a municipality located 65 kilometres (40.38 mi) away northwest from Madrid city centre, in the northern slope of the Sistema Central mountain range. It belongs to the province of Segovia and to the autonomous Community of Castile and León. The distance from the city of Segovia is 34 kilometres (21.12 mi).

According to the 2025 census (INE), the municipality has 10,409 inhabitants, being 5,258 men and 5,151 women.

The municipality has four population centres that are physically separate from one another:

- El Espinar.
- San Rafael.
- La Estación de El Espinar.
- Los Ángeles de San Rafael.

The population centre of El Espinar, the oldest and the most populated one, gives the name to the entire local territory and has the municipality hall's headquarters. As of 2024, these 10,145 inhabitants are roughly distributed in the municipality as follows: 50% of population live in El Espinar, 25% in San Rafael, 15% in Los Ángeles de San Rafael and 10% in La Estación de El Espinar.

The municipality is not part of Madrid metropolitan area, but is not far away from it because its outer ring begins just heading 25 kilometres southeast in Collado Villalba. However, the municipality of El Espinar is part of Madrid's functional urban area as more than 15% of the inhabitants commute daily in Madrid.

== History ==
The documented history of El Espinar dates from the 11th century, even though the area has been inhabited since the Iron Age. In fact, in September 2016 was found the settlement of Canto Los Hierros in a nearby mountain located south of town, just at 1,700 metres above sea level. The settlement, dated back to the Iron Age and later reused and expanded by the Romans, covered about 70 hectares and included about 100 houses, few traces of walls and quite a lot of iron items. This kind of ancient settlement at such a high altitude is considered unique within Europe.

Before the arriving of the Romans, the area known today as the municipality of El Espinar probably was in the very eastern limit of the vettones territory.

During the rule of the Visigothic Kingdom, the area was not known as El Espinar, but as Gudillos, and then during the rule of Al-Andalus it received the name of Albarrana.

In 1293 received the foundation document called as Carta Puebla, which made the area independent from the city of Segovia and therefore received city rights. The Carta Puebla was renewed later in 1317 and in 1368, which allowed the municipality to increase its territory.

El Espinar played a crucial role during the Revolt of the Comuneros as a guerrilla warfare unit of nearly 2,000 men gathered by the leader rebel Juan Bravo moved to Segovia to support the rebels as the royalist armies had started to suffocate the comuneros rebellion.

During the 18th century, both the economy and the population boosted because of the sheep wool production and for the replacement of the farthest mountain pass of La Fuenfría by the nearest one of Guadarrama Pass as the safest, main mountain pass to travel between Madrid and the northwestern quadrant of the Iberian Peninsula. In 1888, the railway between Madrid and Segovia was built, so the area experienced a boost as less time was needed to travel from El Espinar to both Madrid and Segovia.

In the early 20th century, El Espinar became more famous for people from Madrid as a place to spend summer holidays whilst keeping away from the hotter Madrid's summers. From 1936 to 1939, the eastern limit of the council by the Guadarrama pass became a key frontline during the Spanish Civil War. Because of that reason, nowadays the area is famous for the several bunkers and becoming a popular destination for people who like to follow the traces of war. During the early 21st century, the town increased its population as people from Madrid moved to the area to live permanently there whilst working elsewhere in Madrid as commuters. Living there as remote online workers and moving only one day per week to Madrid city centre is also a growing fast trend.

== Geography, hydrography and climate ==
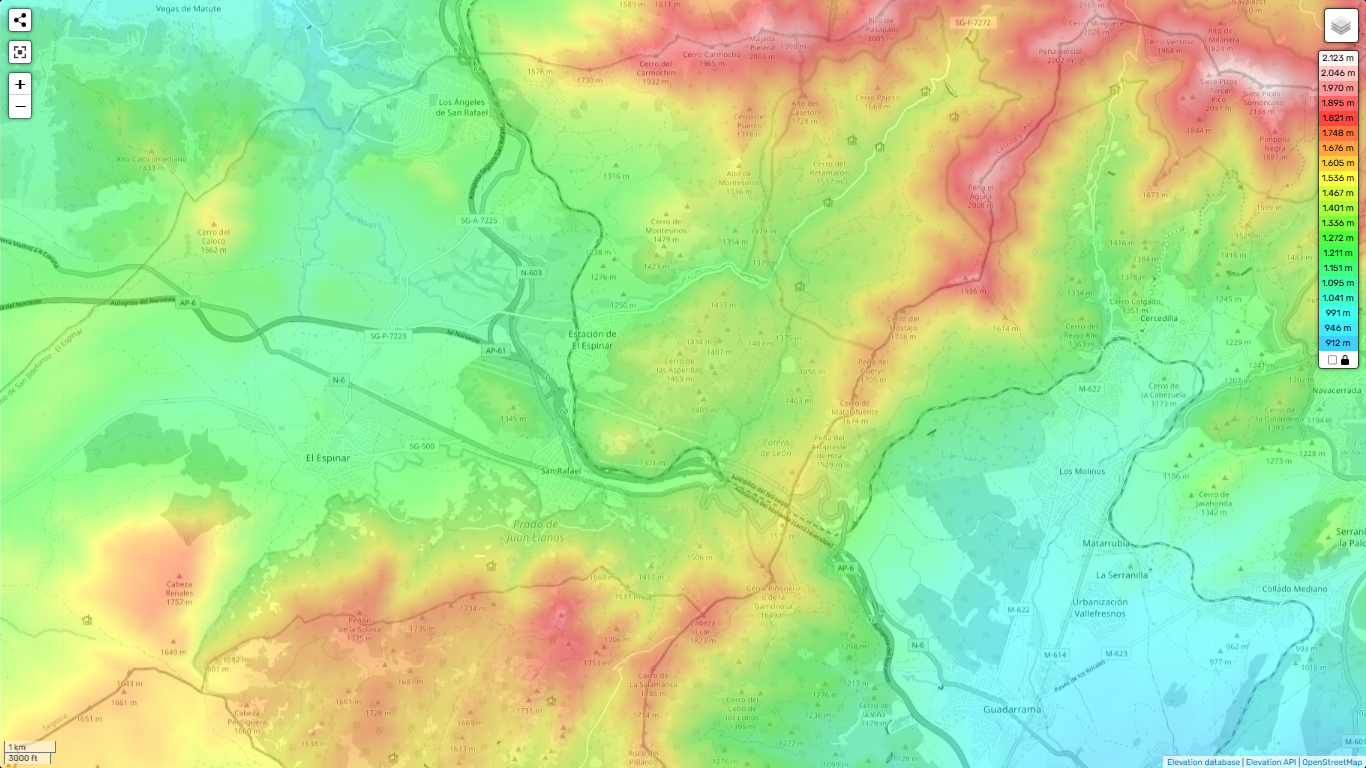
Topographic map of El Espinar and surrounding areas.

=== Geography ===
El Espinar is in the south of Segovia province. It is embedded by the mountains of the Sistema Central by the north, the east and the south, and only the west and the northwest are partially open to the lower lands of the high northern plateau.

The altitude from the entire local territory range from 2,197 metres at the peak of La Pinareja mountain to 1,050 metres above sea level by the Moros valley when leaving the local territory heading northwest, although the inhabited areas are located between 1,100 and 1,200 metres above sea level. From the top of the mountains located at the eastern limit of the local territory, the high southern plateau, the skyline of Madrid and most of its western metropolitan area are easily seen during clear days. From the mountains located at the western and northern limits, there is a great view of the high northern plateau, whereas from those ones located at the southwest the Gredos mountains can be seen as well.

The three highest mountains are in the northeast: La Pinareja (2,197 m), Peña del Oso (2,196 m) and Montón de Trigo (2,161 m). All the other peaks in the local territory are below 2,000 m, such as Cueva Valiente (1,904 m) and Cabeza Líjar (1,824 m) in the south, La Peñota (1,945 m) in the east and Caloco (1,567 m) in the west.

=== Hidrography ===
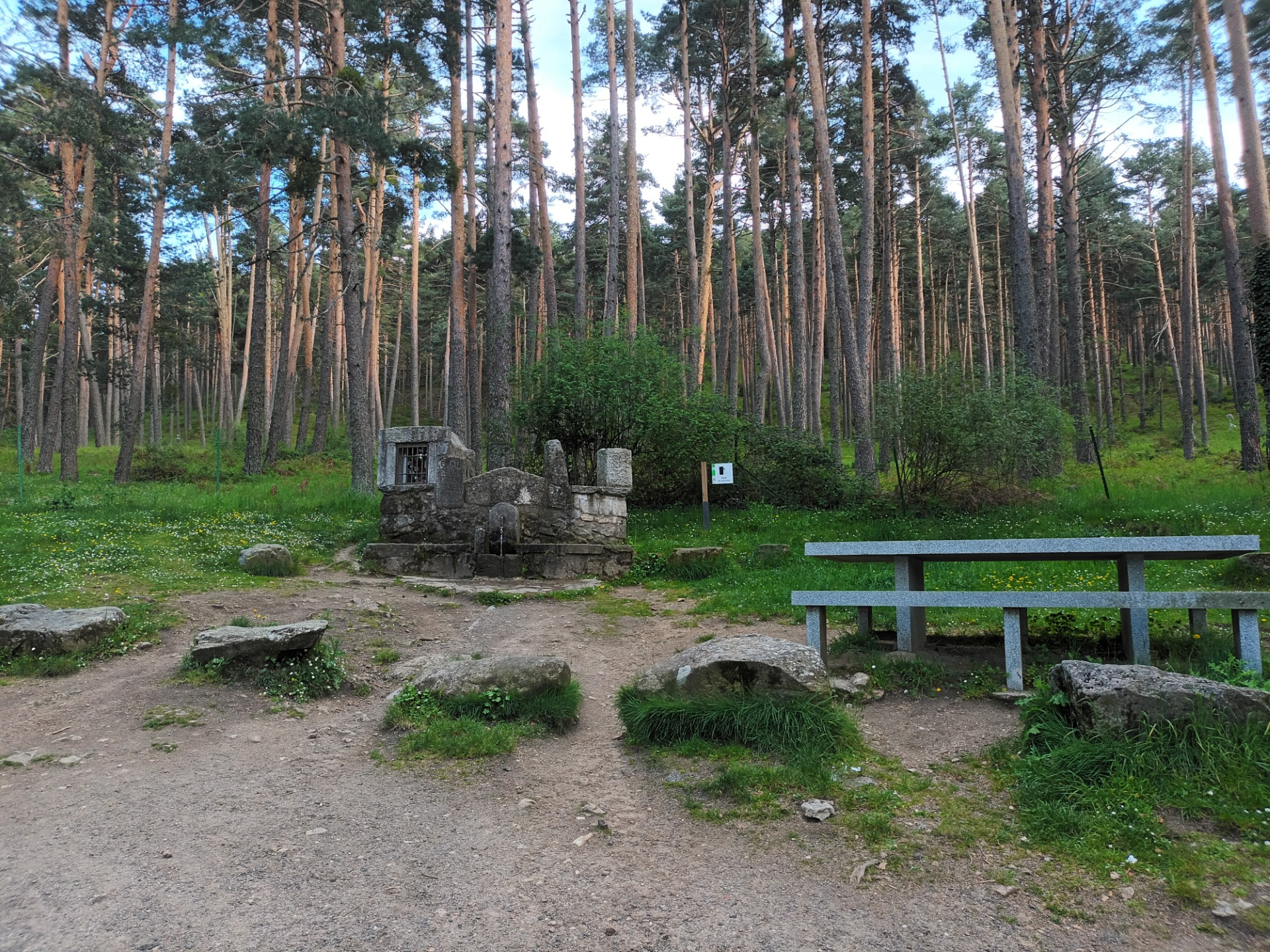
The drinkable water spring of La Virgen de Las Nieves in the south of San Rafael.

==== Rivers ====
Except for two small areas in the west that belong to both the Voltoya and the Cofio bassin areas, most of the local territory of the entire council is located in the upper Moros valley, so the Moros river is a tributary of the Eresma, then the Eresma is a tributary of the river Adaja, and finally the Adaja is a tributary of the Duero.

The river Moros runs from its source at the western slope of Montón de Trigo mountain heading southwest. Then it turns westward and runs along the northern boundary of La Estación de El Espinar and then turns northwest heading Los Ángeles de San Rafael, although it only fringes on the westernmost side of its built-up area.

The river Gudillos, which is the main tributary of the Moros within the local territory, has its headwaters near El Baldío area, not far from the western foothill of La Peñota mountain. Then it runs southwest until it reaches the northern side of the AP-6 motorway, and then turns west running parallel to the motorway, encompasses the northern boundary of San Rafael, keeps going parallel to the motorway and then, two kilometres northwest of San Rafael, turns northwest until it meets the Moros river just four kilometres southeast of Los Ángeles de San Rafael. Two brooks that are tributaries of the river Gudillos pass through the built-up area of San Rafael: The Mayor and the Gargantilla.

The population centre of El Espinar is not approached by neither the Moros nor the Gudillos. However, two small brooks run through its built-up area, just El Boquerón one from the southwest and Prado Goyato one from the southeast. These two brooks converge near the Arciprestre de Hita primary school and, from this spot onwards, a more substantial watercourse is created with the name of La Soledad, which runs north while leaving the built-up area and continues north as a tributary to the brook of La Tejera, and finally La Tejera meets the Moros river just three kilometres southeast of Los Ángeles de San Rafael.

==== Other ====
There are three small dams along the upper Moros valley within the local territory:

- El Vado de Las Cabras with a surface area of 2 ha.
- El Tejo with a surface area of 11 ha.
- Los Ángeles with a surface area of 13 ha.

There are not lakes, but instead there are two small ponds near the Gudillos river; the first one near its headwaters, and the second one just 800 metres before joining the Moros river.

There are some beautiful human-made natural swimming pools in the wild named as La Panera, just by the Moros river in the middle of the pine forest. They are located about two kilometres east of La Estación de El Espinar.

The brook of El Boquerón has a three metres high waterfall that is located three kilometres southwest of El Espinar population centre.

There are more than 180 drinkable water springs within the territory of the entire local council and surrounding local councils.

=== Climate ===
El Espinar has a mediterranean climate with strong continental influence because of its location in the centre of the Iberian Peninsula, and it is also modified by its high altitude. According to the Köppen climate classification the inhabited areas have a Csb climate, therefore temperate with dry summers. There are not weather stations in the top of the mountains, but a Dsb climate, just a colder version with dry summers as well, should be expected up there above 1,900 metres as temperature decreases with altitude.

By November 2025, the four population centres of the municipality are well covered by six online weather stations, of which one public runs by Aemet and five private ones on Weather Underground run by weather enthusiasts.

==== Precipitation ====
Summer is the driest season, as few thunderstorms by their convective cumulonimbus clouds bring rain showers during July and August; on the other hand, rain coming from not towering vertical clouds during summer almost never happen, but certainly the rest of the year.

Late autumn is the rainiest season, whereas mid-spring is slightly less rainy. Late winter is a little bit dry than autumn and spring months, but is not bone dry like summer. Wettest yearly average precipitation range from 700 to 1,000 mm, and driest ones range from 400 to 600 mm. Severe drought extending beyond summer months is not unheard of during driest years. Unlike in the surrounding lower lands, as mid-spring in El Espinar tend to be a little bit rainier and colder, the grass usually keeps green until late May during dry late springs and to late June or even early July when late springs are rainier than average. Then, from late September onwards, when summer drought is over, the grass turns green again.

From late September to early May, the biggest amounts of precipitation usually occur with either south-easterlies and north-westerlies, whereas little or any precipitation at all should be expected with south-westerlies and north-easterlies. The reason for that is the Sistema Central mountain range that creates some rain shadow in the upper Moros valley, and therefore in almost the entire territory of the municipality. However, things are different in the nearby municipalities and valleys. For instance, in the Guadarrama valley around Collado Villalba, only 25 kilometres heading southeast, north-westerlies bring little precipitation, whereas in the Eresma valley around the city of Segovia, just 30 kilometres heading north, south-easterlies bring little precipitation as well.

Anyway, during summer, rain showers are less common and usually occur during brief thunderstorms. Such thunderstorms usually move from south to north. However, thunderstorms with heavy lightning, heavy wind gust and large hail, although rare, can occur and these ones mainly move from southeast to northwest.

Snowfall can happen from late November to mid-April, rarely in late April and early May, and heavy snowfalls with snow depth up to 40 centimetres or more in a row usually happen at least once every three or four years. However, since 2014 onward, except for January 2018, February 2018 and January 2021, snowfalls and heavy frost are getting rare which can be a consequence of the climate change.

==== Temperature ====
During mid-summer, average daily highs usually range from 27 °C to 30 °C, whereas average daily lows usually range from 12 °C to 14 °C. During heavy cold waves, low temperatures can drop to −15 °C; on the other hand, during heavy heat waves, high temperatures can reach 36 °C. For someone pretending to stay all night long elsewhere outdoor during the peak of summer, a long-sleeved sweatshirt should be required for 90% of nights.

Maximum highs being lower than 0 °C (32 °F) for an entire day, or even during two or three consecutive days could happen during heavy cold waves, but only if northern winds bring strong, persistent low clouds with any sunshine at noon. Some winters four or five days like that are expected, but many others winters it only happens one day or even any at all.

Climate data for El Espinar. Elevation: 1,237 m (4,058 ft). 1987 - 2022 normals.
Month	Jan	Feb	Mar	Apr	May	Jun	Jul	Aug	Sep	Oct	Nov	Dec	Year
Daily mean °C (°F)	2.6 (36.7)	3.6 (38.5)	6.0 (42.8)	7.7 (45.9)	11.9 (53.4)	16.2 (61.2)	19.5 (67.1)	19.6 (67.3)	15.5 (59.9)	11.2 (52.2)	5.9 (42.6)	3.9 (39.0)	10.3 (50.5)
Average precipitation mm (inches)	66.0 (2.60)	54.4 (2.14)	58.9 (2.32)	67.5 (2.66)	66.5 (2.62)	34.5 (1.36)	17.5 (0.69)	18.4 (0.72)	37.7 (1.48)	82.9 (3.26)	94.7 (3.73)	78.4 (3.09)	677.4 (26.67)
Source: Aemet. El Espinar's wood company weather station. Weather data provided by Enrique Martín and José Enrique Martín that has been published in La Voz de El Espinar local newspaper.

== Fauna and flora ==
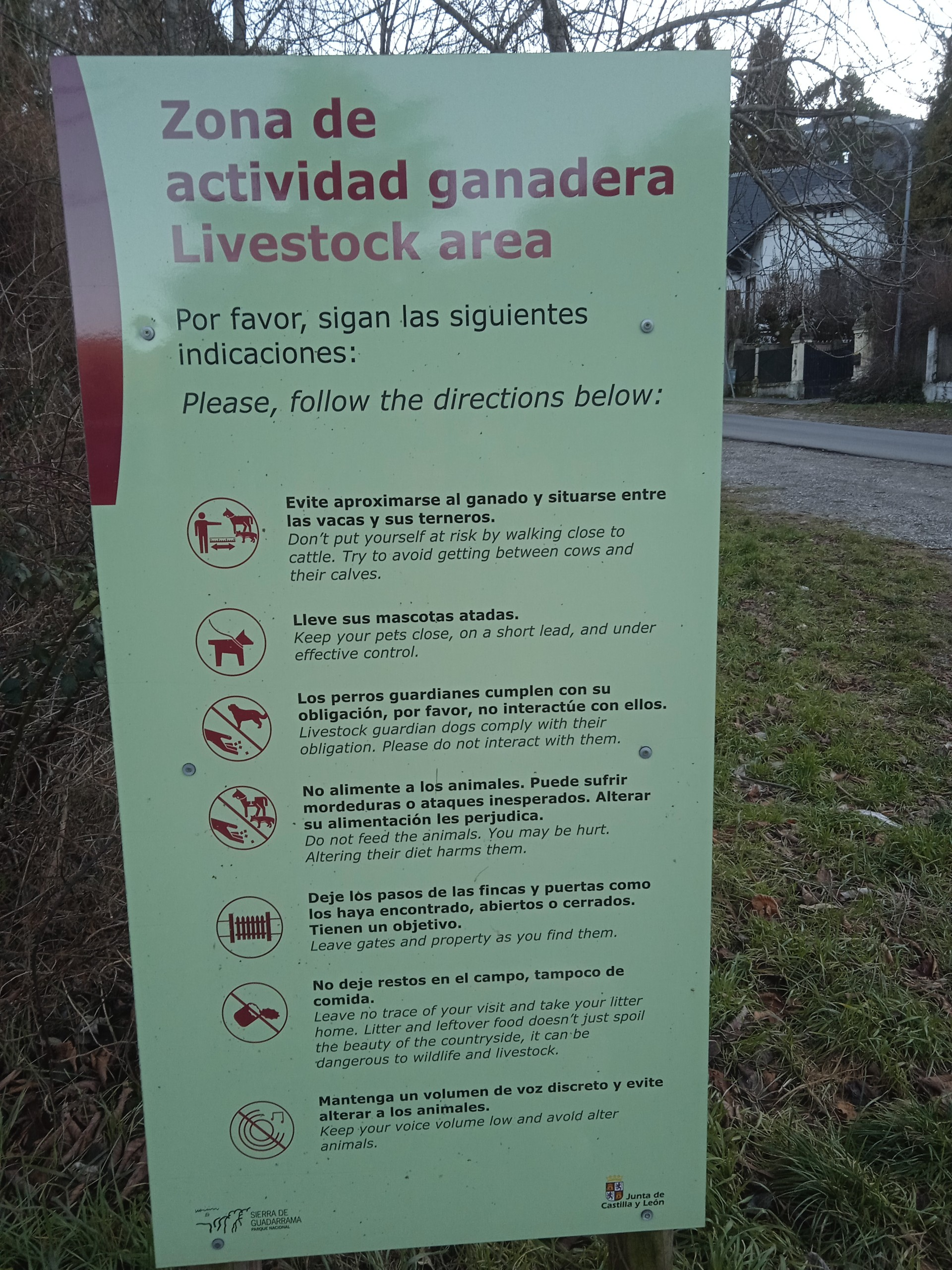
Bilingual sign located in southern San Rafael before entering the pine forest.

The flora resembles pretty much mediterranean, but some deciduous trees also cover some areas within the local territory. The southern and the eastern mountains are peculiarly wooded mainly by Pinus sylvestris, but there is also a small cluster pine forest located by the secondary road between San Rafael and La Estación. The northern and western areas are less wooded by oaks forming the so-called dehesa and by grasslands. The mountains above 1,900 metres are wooded by shrubland as winter there is harsh and long, whereas summer is short and dry, which prevents almost any type of big trees. On the other hand, below 1,200 metres, there are some gallery forests, mainly by silver popla and ash, that follow the several streams that irrigate the whole area. There are some small deciduous forests of Pyrenean oak, mainly south of the SG-500 road near the indoor swimming pool.

Wildlife is represented by many animals, such as roe deer, wild boar, badger, weasel, fox, Spanish imperial eagle, Eurasian black vulture and Graellsia isabellae. White stork and their nests are pretty common not only in the pine forest but also in the churches and other buildings. Some years when autumn and winter are warmer than average they don't fly south heading to Africa. The European cuckoos usually return every spring by mid-April, and they come back to Africa from late July to mid-August. Their beautiful song can be heard everywhere in the pine forest during the breeding season.

There are not dangerous animals, except for the lataste's viper and wild boar, but they only bit humans if disturbed heavily. Some nomadic Iberian wolf small groups have been seen in recent years, especially in the western meadows of Campo Azálvaro, but they don't approach the population centres as they avoid humans.

There is a facility and visitor centre to spot scavenger birds located besides the SG-500 secondary road heading west towards Campo Azálvaro. The municipality is also famous for tourism focused on collect edible mushrooms, but the local law stated that anyone interested in it must pay for a permit fee. Wild camping is forbidden in the entire municipal territory.

=== Protected ecosystem ===
There are 1,082 hectares in the northeastern mountains that are inside the Guadarrama National Park, which make that 5,3% of the surface of the entire national park belong to the local council's territory. Such protected area is the southwesternmost boundary of the whole national park.

Some of the westernmost area by the landscapes of Campo Azálvaro is also covered by a special protection area for birds.

== Transport ==
=== Roads ===
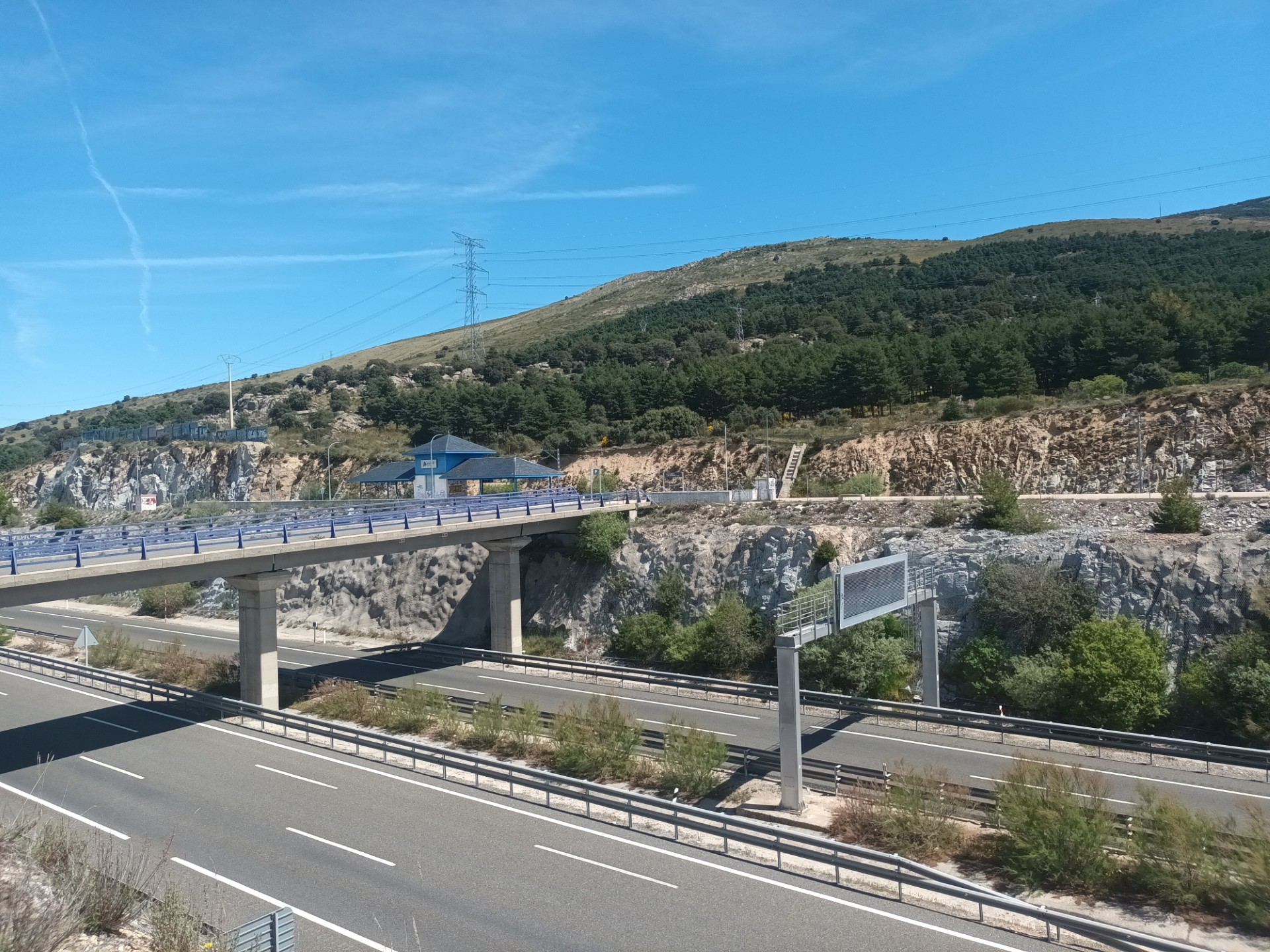
Los Ángeles de San Rafael's railway halt and the AP-61 motorway.

There are two toll motorways and two main roads which serve the local territory, just the motorways AP-6 and AP-61 and the main roads N-6 and N-603. The AP-6 is the motorway that link Madrid with the far northwest of Spain up to La Coruña by more than 500 kilometres, although its toll only applies between the Guadarrama tunnel and Adanero (about 35 kilometres). The AP-61 is the link between El Espinar and Segovia by 33 kilometres. The N-6 is the alternative route for the AP-6 to avoid the toll, and the same applies for the N-603 to avoid the AP-61 toll.

=== Train ===
==== Commuter train ====
The municipality is served by the normal railway between Madrid and Segovia via Collado Villalba, not by the high speed one. The railway has three halts and one station within the local territory of El Espinar, therefore ordered from southeast to northwest there are the halts of Gudillos, San Rafael, the station of Estación de El Espinar and finally the halt of Los Ángeles de San Rafael. The local council and some railway enthusiasts societies have requested several times to include that railway inside the commuter railway system of Madrid, but it has not been done yet.

However, the railway works "de facto" as any other commuter railway of nearby Madrid region because the operating trains and the technical are the same, but as the Segovia - Collado Villalba stretch make a lot of turns because the topography of the mountains, it is not a fast way to go by train from El Espinar to Madrid city centre. The train station of Collado Villalba, located 25 kilometres southeast of El Espinar population centre, is the nearest one properly included within the commuter railway system of Madrid, and it allows a fast access to the main train stations of the whole Madrid metropolitan area because anywhere east of Collado Villalba heading Madrid city centre there are not mountains, so the railway allows more speed.

==== High-speed train ====
The municipality has not high-speed railway network. However, the three nearest stations are not so far away: Guiomar, Chamartín and Atocha.

=== Bus ===
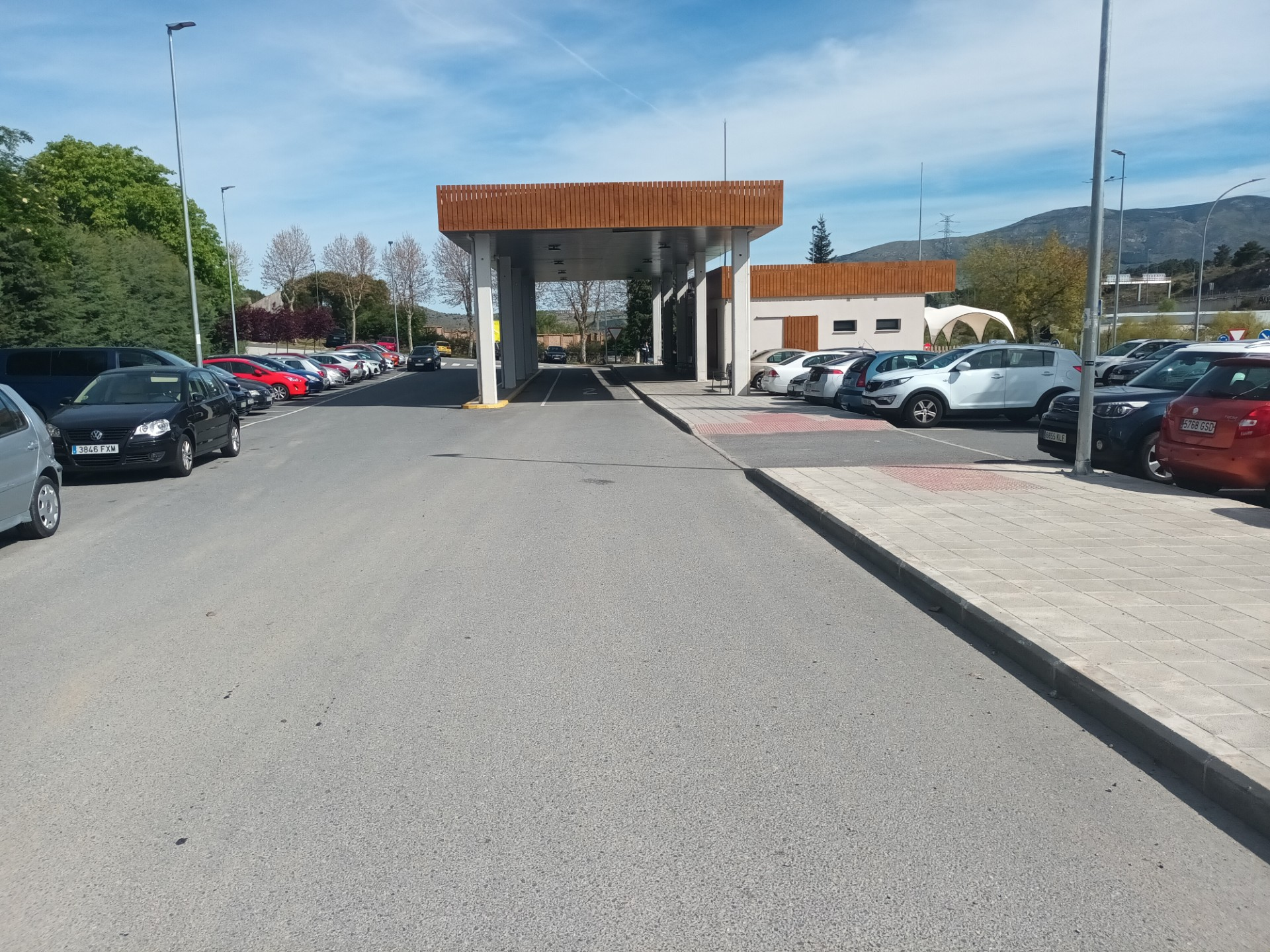
San Rafael's bus station.

There are two urban bus lines that connect the four population centres of the municipality, which are often referred to as "La Carrula". The line number one runs from El Espinar to San Rafael and to La Estación de El Espinar and the other way around, whereas the line number two runs directly from El Espinar to Los Ángeles de San Rafael. Before 2024 there was only a single bus line connecting the four urban settlements. Since February 2023 the urban bus is free.

Thus, there are two intercity bus lines which link the town with both Segovia and the madrilenian interchange transport hub of Moncloa; they usually run as direct buses to the two cities, but sometimes do their way by stopping in all the population centres located in between. These bus lines are owned by the enterprise named Avanza. Being inside Moncloa interchange hub for someone who need to travel to El Espinar, it is required first to go to the food court area and find the Avanza stand, then to purchase the tickets either on-site or by the ticket machines, and then move to the big room designed in Spanish as "isla 1" with light blue colour and finally go to the docks number eight and nine. It usually last 45 minutes to go from Moncloa to El Espinar. On the other hand, going from the city of Segovia to El Espinar is also possible with Avanza through the Segovia's bus station, which is much smaller and less crowded than Moncloa interchange hub, and going from Segovia to El Espinar takes roughly 25 minutes.

== Tourism ==
Many madrilenians own their second homes there, so the population increases almost every weekend. Such trend increases during summer, long weekends and the Holy Week, so they bring a threefold increase in the population for that reason. Thus, there are some hotels and motels, and there is also a great number of country houses and rural cottages available for proper tourists. During 2024, just 19,791 foreign tourists visited the municipality of El Espinar, mainly from France, The Netherlands, Germany, Belgium, United Kingdom, Italy and Portugal.

== Economy ==
El Espinar has been living for centuries by logging and by sheep wool industry, although since the mid 20th century most people work in the service sector. Food and aluminium industries also has been playing an important role in the economy of El Espinar since the late 20th century. There is an industrial state named Polígono Los Llanos that is located two kilometres west of El Espinar population centre, which is the largest established industrial area within the entire municipality.

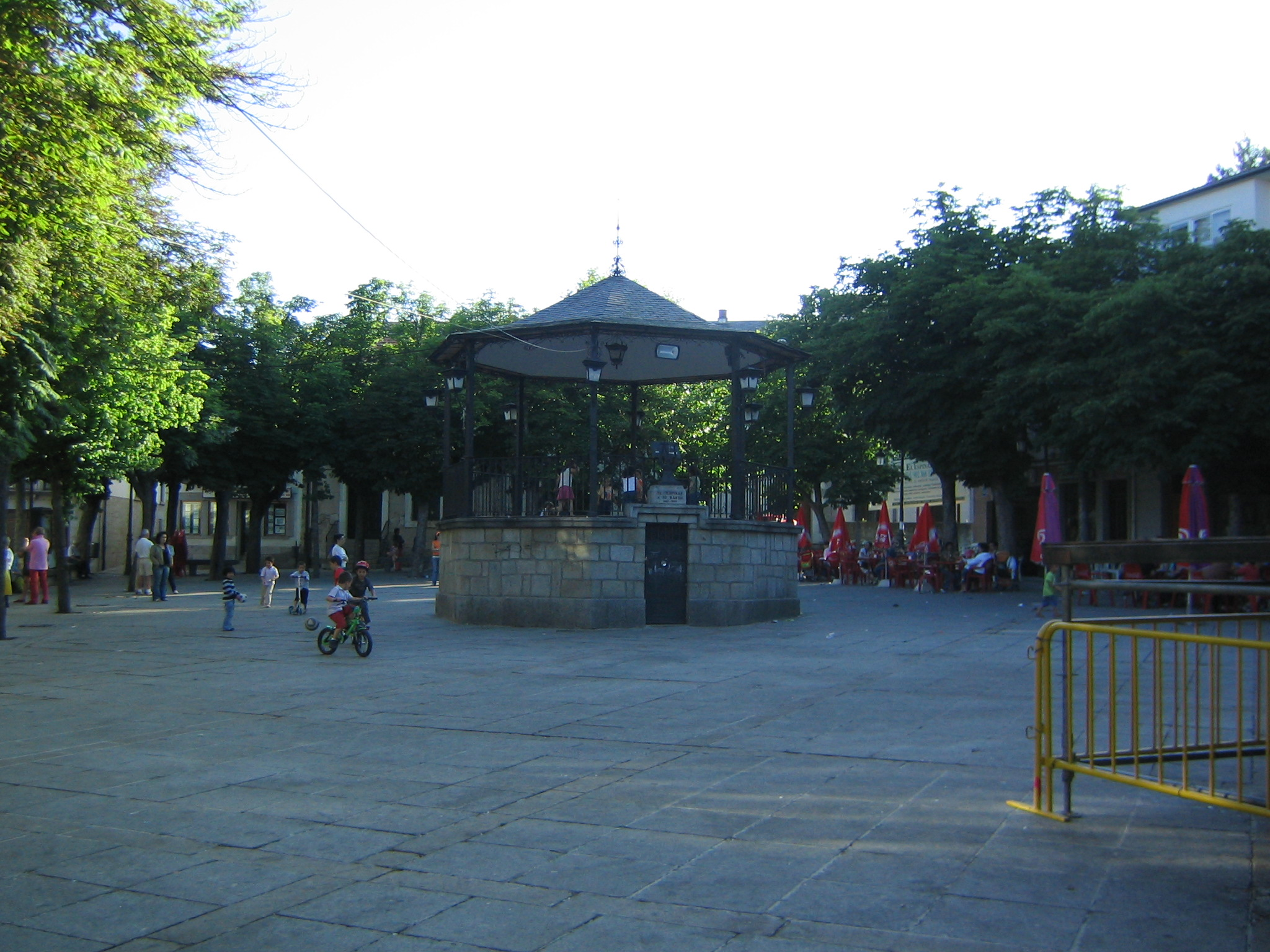
Plaza de la Corredera.

== Education ==
There are three public primary schools, one public secondary school and four kindergarten for kids from birth to three years old, serving the municipality. There is also a private further education school mainly focused on foreign languages and extra support lessons. There are no universities, but people interested in higher education do not need to move to the nearest cities because public transport allows study in the main universities of Segovia and Madrid while living permanently in the municipality.

== Local media ==
=== Television ===
There is not local television channel, but some local news are covered by La 8 which covers the entire province of Segovia. Television signals are received by the TV transmitting station located at the top of El Estepar hill, which is located just a few hundred of metres northwest of San Rafael.

=== Radio ===
In 2009 a local radio named Onda El Espinar began its broadcast. In February 2020 it ended because of lack of agreement with the local council, but it is also expected that during 2025 it would begin broadcasting again.

=== Newspapers ===
In late 90s the first local monthly newspaper was founded by the name of El Periódico de El Espinar, but in November 2022 it changes to the name La Voz de El Espinar by performing also some improvements to adjust to recent times.

=== Social media ===
There is an online Facebook channel that provides daily latest news from the municipality.

== Demography ==
In terms of demographic statistics, the population of the four urban centres of the municipality is counted together.

Historical population according to the INE census
Year	Population
1860	1,989
1900	2,087
1910	2,603
1920	3,006
1930	3,693
1940	3,744
1950	4,525
1960	4,772
1970	5,069
1981	4,968
1991	5,079
2001	6,293
2011	9,749
2021	9,476
2022	9,662
2023	9,814
2024	10,145
2025	10,409

== Sport ==
The municipality is represented by teams in the major national sports, such as football, five-a-side football, basketball, handball, cycling, equestrian sports, golf and artistic roller skating. Football is the most famous one as there are several teams, including female football teams as well. Hiking is also a popular, eco-friendly practice because there are so many hiking trails around. Since 1986, every year in July, the town held the Open Castilla y León international tennis tournament.

There is also a golf course that consist in nine holes, which is located heading west of towards Campo Azálvaro. Sometimes, especially during the pre-season, the Atlético Madrid uses to gate together in Los Ángeles de San Rafael. Apart from the natural swimming pool by the Moros river located in the middle of the pine forest heading east of La Estación de El Espinar, there are also two outdoor swimming pools and one indoor swimming pool with gym and sauna facilities. The outdoor pool season usually last from late June to early September.

The Vuelta a España cycling race sometimes pass through the municipality of El Espinar the day before the end of the race in Madrid. When it happens, the race usually comes from Guadarrama by the Guadarrama pass (known as well as El Alto del León) heading towards San Rafael following the N-6, then it turns north by the N-603 heading Los Ángeles de San Rafael in their way to the next mountain pass of Navacerrada and to the peak of Bola del Mundo mountain.

From 1978 to 2008 the Guadarrama climb classic one-day race always passed through the municipality.

== Architecture and urban planning ==
Every of the four population centres has its own characteristics:

=== El Espinar ===
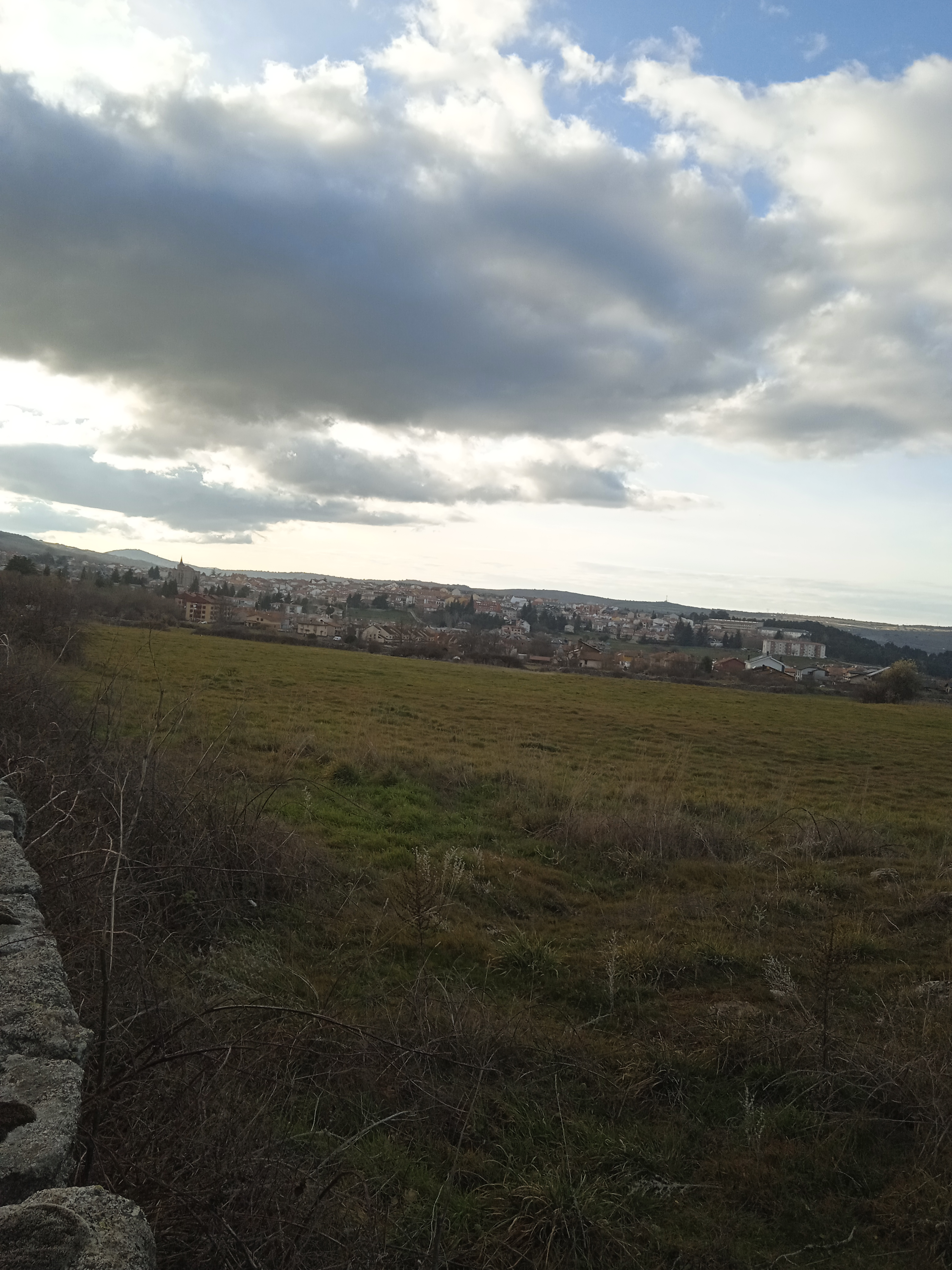
Panoramic view of El Espinar centre from the east.

The ancient neighbourhood of the district contains houses which commonly are one or two floors, although some remodelled houses now are three floors. Other modern neighbourhoods that have been built in the 20th century are four floors high, but most of the modern neighbourhoods have semi-detached houses and individual houses with private gardens, especially in the eastern and southern areas. The tallest building, which is also the main sight, is the San Eutropio church, with its 18 metres approximately. It is a late Gothic church with some traces of Renaissance style and was designed using the Latin cross plan. There are two lovely urban parks named Parque Cipriano Geromini and El Pinarillo that are perfect for enjoy summertime shade because of the great trees.

=== San Rafael ===
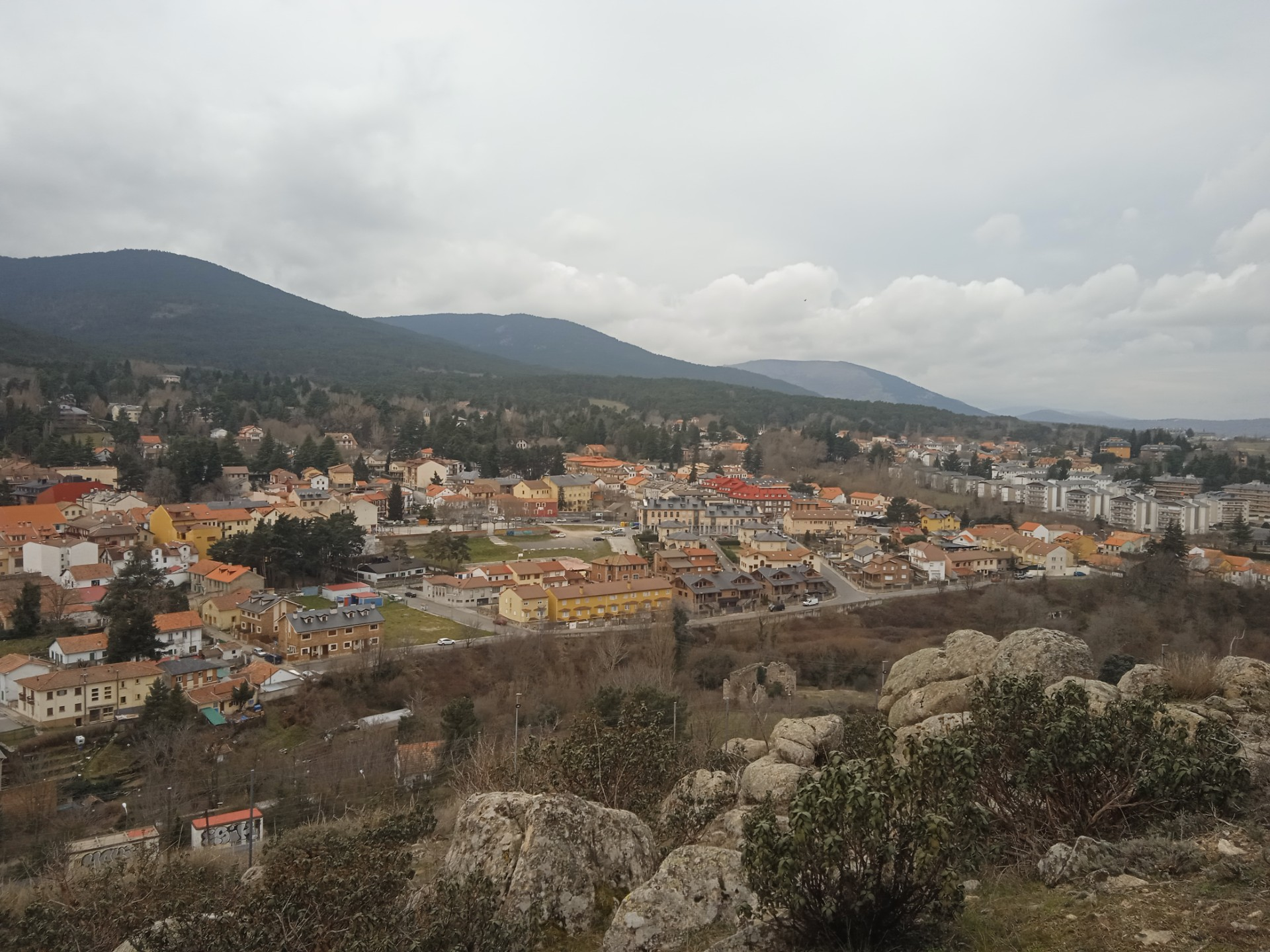
View of the centre of San Rafael from the nearby Cabeza Reina mountain.

Its origin dates back to 1790, when some houses were built besides the current crossroad between the N-6 and the N-603. However, it gained popularity in the late 19th century and early 20th century when people from the former ruling class coming from Madrid started to build independent houses with gardens, some of them following a Swiss traditional style, and many of these houses still can be found today in the southern neighbourhoods. In fact, the urban alpine vibe, the nature scenery and the climate are the reason that the settlement of San Rafael is often known as "The Spanish Switzerland". Over the years, the district expanded with some real state developments made by residential flat buildings with four floors, but still the most common type of houses are individual and semi-detached ones. The tallest building is the San Rafael church, with its approximately 12 metres altitude.

=== La Estación de El Espinar ===
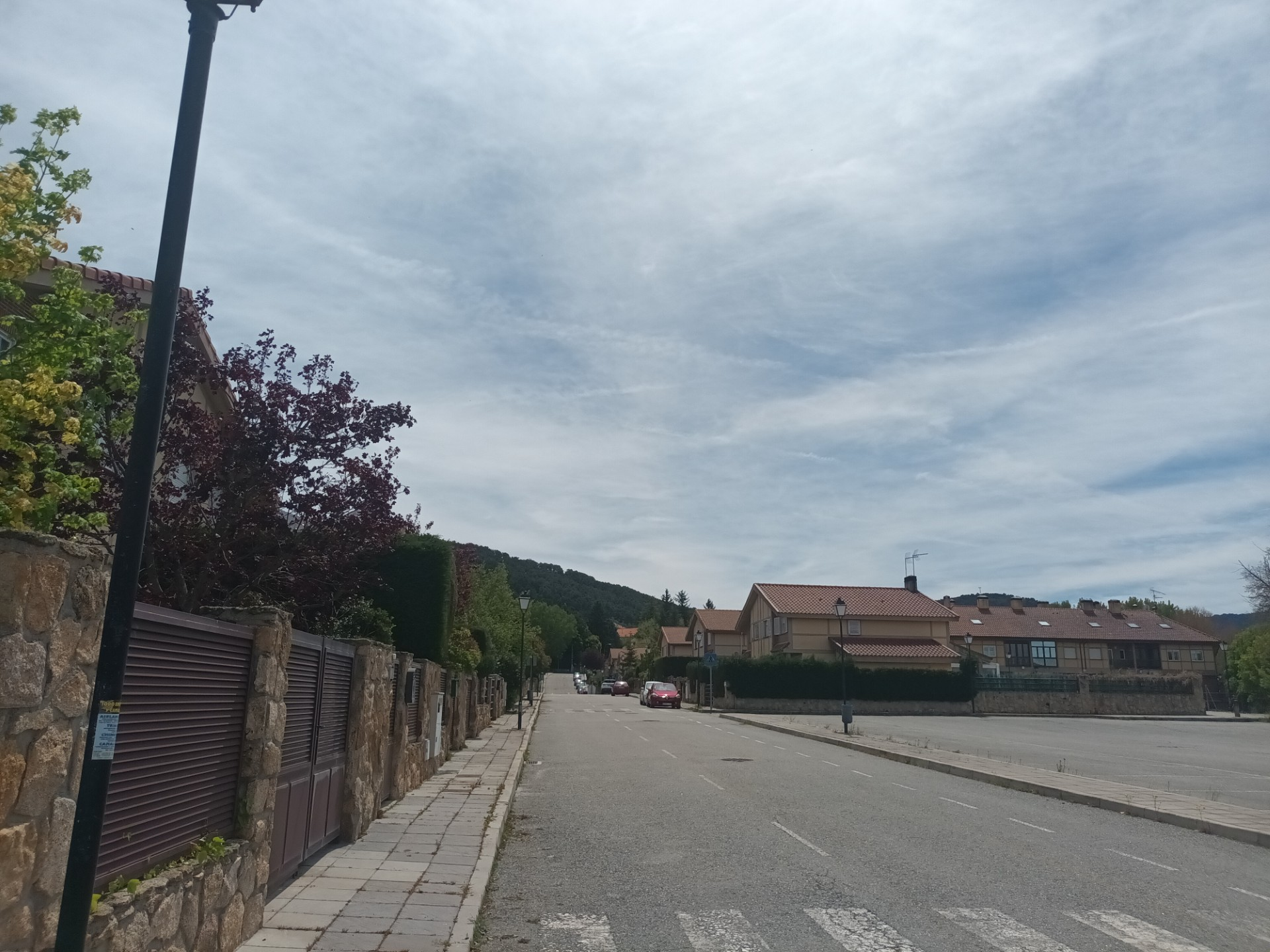
La Estación de El Espinar.

It was started after the normal railroad that links Segovia with Madrid was built, so, in 1888. It has mainly expanded in the eastern side of the railroad with individual houses, whereas semi-detached houses and flats are a tiny part, and there are no flats higher than two floors, so the population density is low. Even the church of San Antonio is really short, so there are neither tall main sights nor a proper skyline.

=== Los Ángeles de San Rafael ===
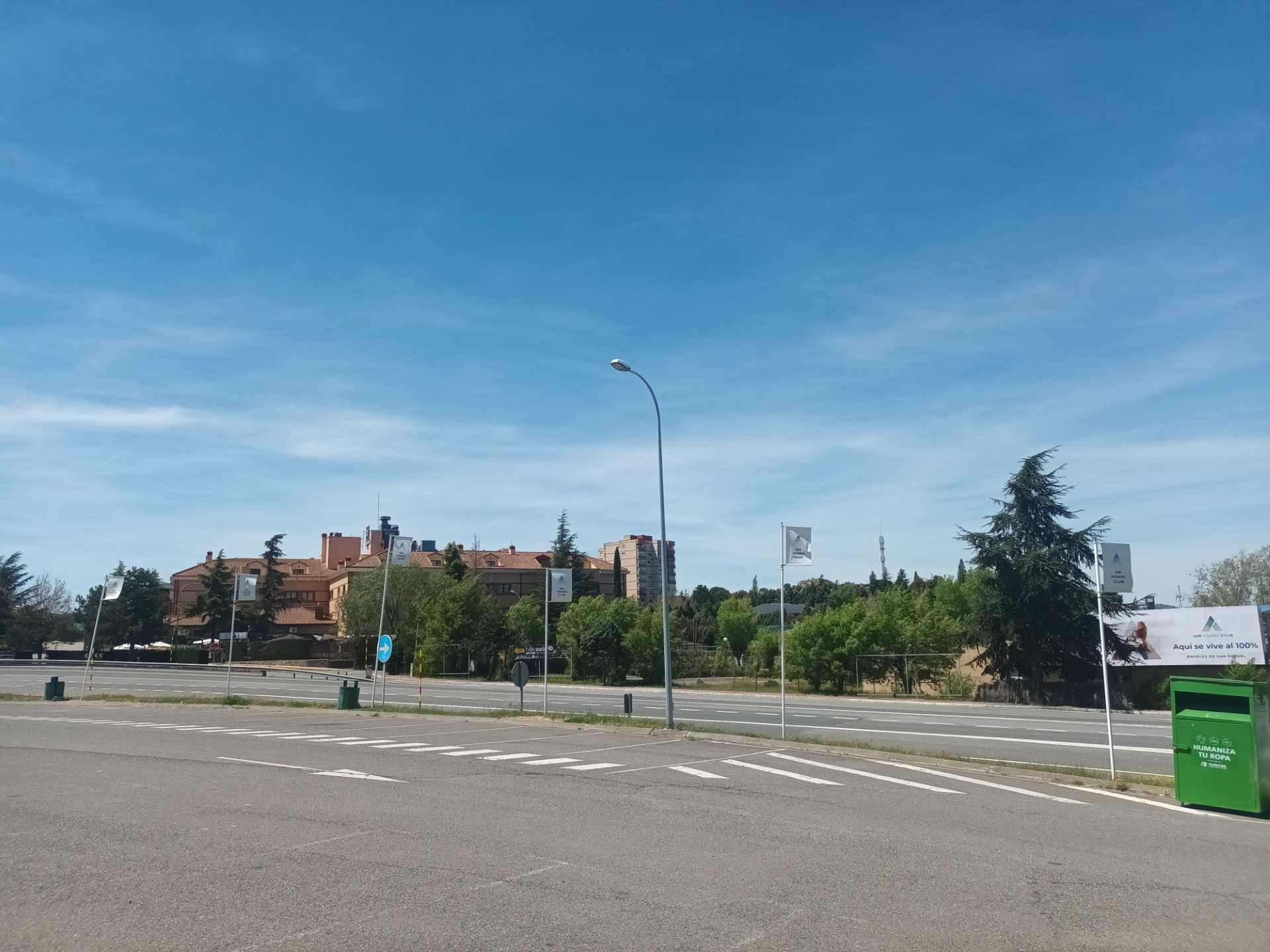
Los Ángeles de San Rafael from the petrol station.

This one is the newest one, as started as late as in 1967 nearby the N-603 road, and then expanded westwards and downhill heading to the Moros river. There are three flat buildings with eight floors each, measuring roughly 28 metres, therefore being the tallest buildings not only in Los Ángeles de San Rafael, but also in the entire local council of El Espinar. Of the four, it is the largest population centre in terms of km2, but not the most populated one, and its western area is a great example of Spaniard sprawl.

== Celebrations and cultural events ==
Every of the four population centres has some venues and festivities:

=== El Espinar ===
- The local festivity (fiestas) of El Cristo del Caloco are the most famous ones by far, and are celebrated during eight days in early September starting the second weekend of September.
- The second most famous ones are the fiestas held in mid-August. Usually are celebrated during three or four days depending on what the town council schedules.
- The Gabarreros festivity (Fiesta de los Gabarreros) is the third most important one. It is held in mid-March and include the felling of a single pine tree in the main square. Such event has its origin in the traditional way of life in the past, when forestry workers used to travel to the nearby pine forest for selectively choosing, felling and cutting mature pines, and then they had to carry them by using pack donkeys.
- Saint Patrick's Day is celebrated in March as well since 2018, and mainly include live music, stands and people usually wear green clothes. It is one of the most important Saint Patrick's events in this part of central Spain outside the big cities. Unlike in Ireland, it is not a religious event.
- The Vikings venue (Hispania de Los Vikingos) is held in early April. It is a Viking modern recreation with many exhibitions and funny outdoor activities. More than 8,000 people from Spain and other European countries have gathered during the 2023 edition.
- During the first days of December a Christmas Market is organised in La Corredera square, and it is the largest one in the entire Segovia province.
- The district also has a concert hall, known as Auditorio Menéndez Pidal, where all kind of concerts and performances take place almost every weekend. Thus, is the biggest one in Segovia province and can accommodate around 400 seated.

=== San Rafael ===
- The patron saint is on 29 September. Until 2011 it was the most important festivity with seven days in a row, but, since then, a referendum took place and most people preferred to move the festivity to late July for weather conditions, as in late September it used to be rainy and cold at night, which has been ruined outdoor activities so many times.
- The Gabarreros is also performed in mid-March in the Plaza Castilla square.
- Around mid-August a craft and flea market is held in the Plaza Castilla square.
- Every 31 December at early afternoon, some people gather for a brief swim at the near-freezing Gudillos river's water just below the viaduct of the AP-6 motorway.

=== La Estación de El Espinar ===
- The festivity of El Carmen takes place in mid-July, whereas the street, live music festival of Femuka is held there yearly in mid-June.

=== Los Ángeles de San Rafael ===
- It is the newest one, as the first houses were built around the late 1960s, so there are neither old folklore nor deep-rooted festivities. However, it also schedules its festivities by late August.

== Non-profit community-based associationism ==
The most notable are the Felinar charity for stray cats, the Yedra women's rights, the Interampas parent-student and the Hesperides citizen science-based associations.

== El Espinar in film ==
The territory of the municipality has been used frequently as a filming location since 1960 and the reason is that there is a great nature scenery that is fairly close to Madrid metropolitan area. El Laberinto del Fauno, Historias Lamentables, El Ministerio del Tiempo, Los Favoritos de Midas, Las Chicas del Cable, La Influencia, Cortafuego (Firebreak), The English (TV series) and The Walking Dead: Daryl Dixon (seasons 3 and 4) are the most well-known films and series mostly or totally filmed in the local council, but many other films, series and spots have been filmed here.

== Gallery ==
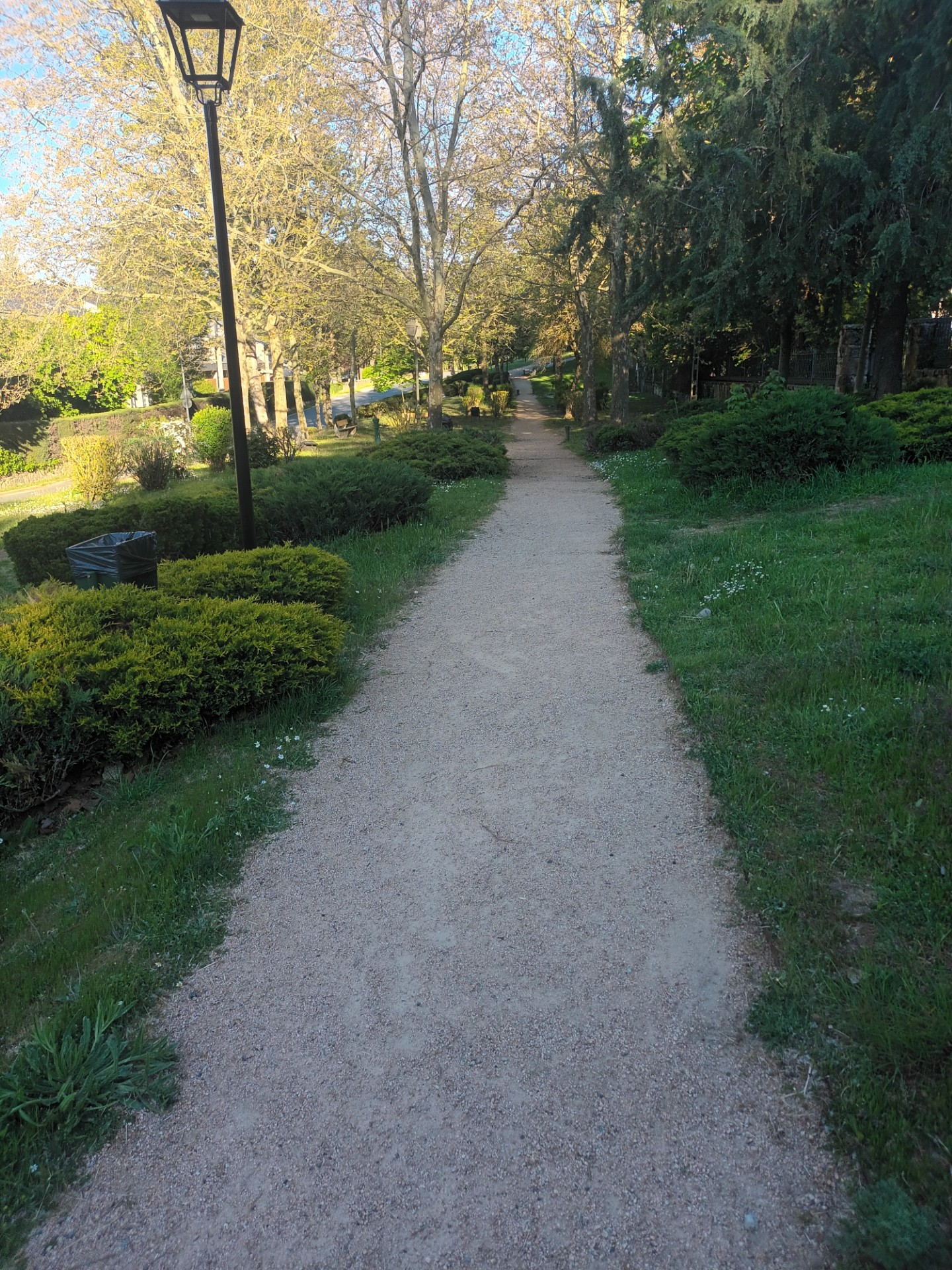
El Cordel park in San Rafael.

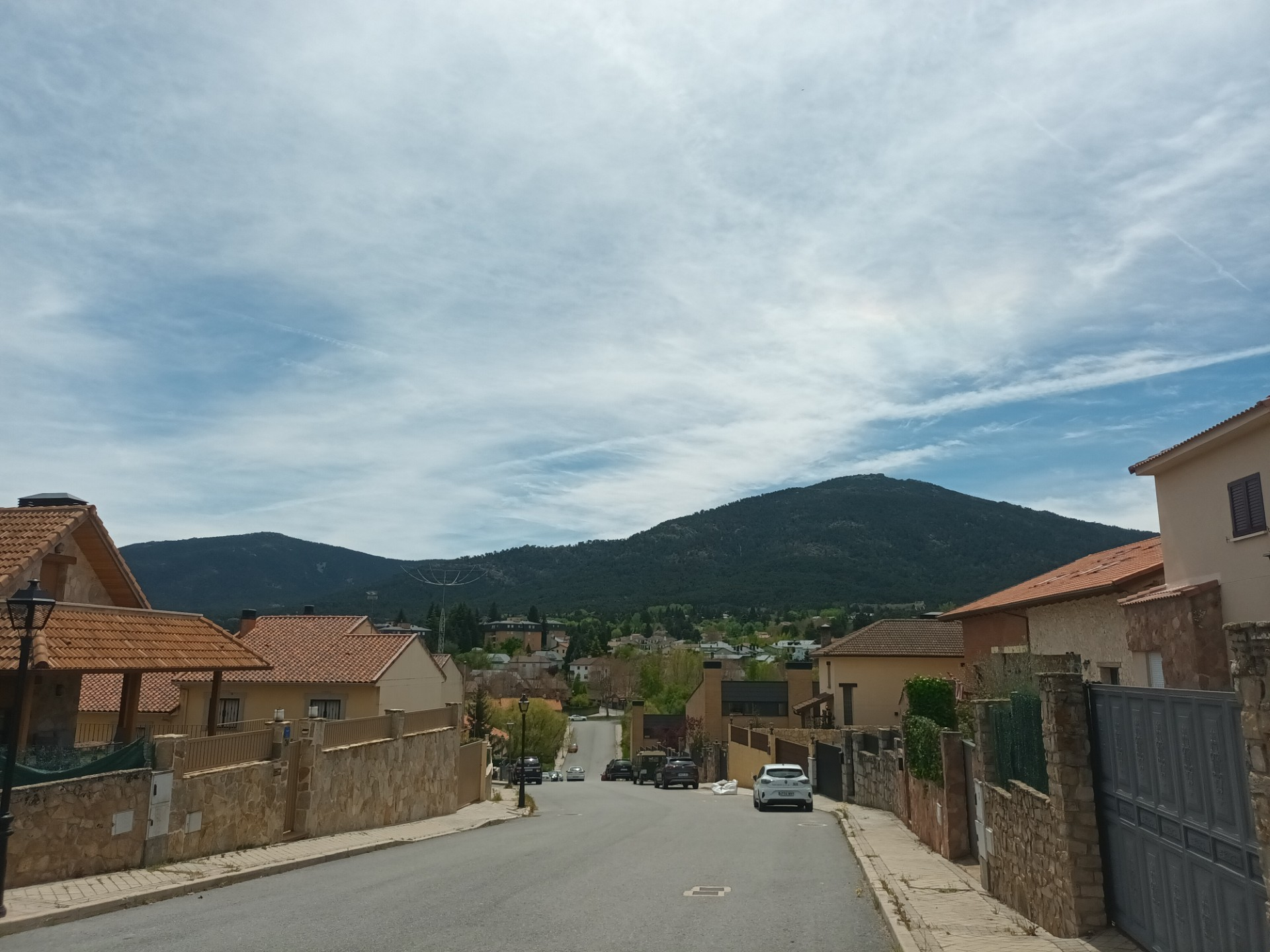
View of San Rafael, Cueva Valiente mountain (right) and Cabeza Lijar mountain (left) from its western neighbourhood of El Tomillar.

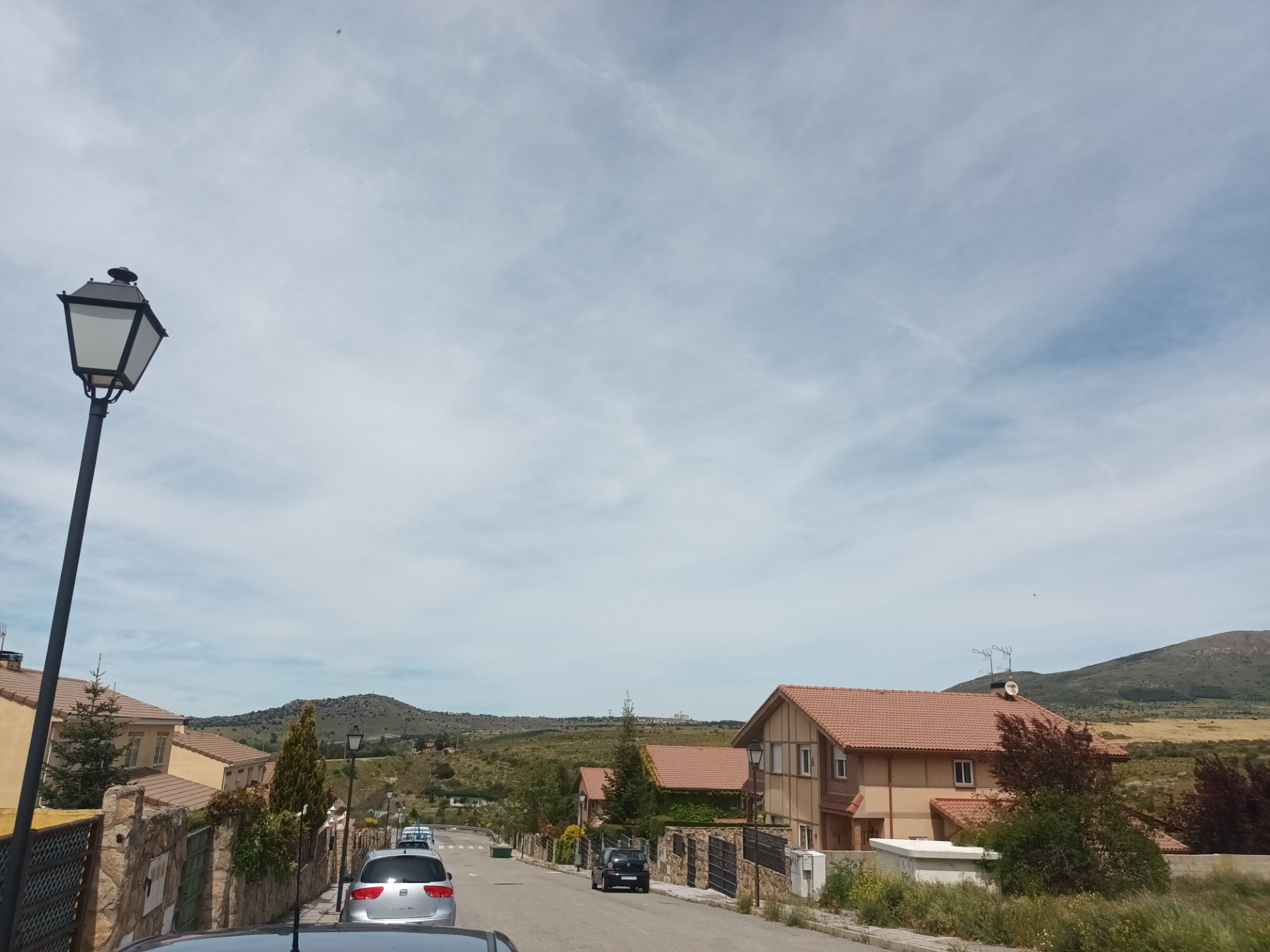
Panoramic view of the highrises of Los Ángeles de San Rafael in the far distance from La Estación de El Espinar.

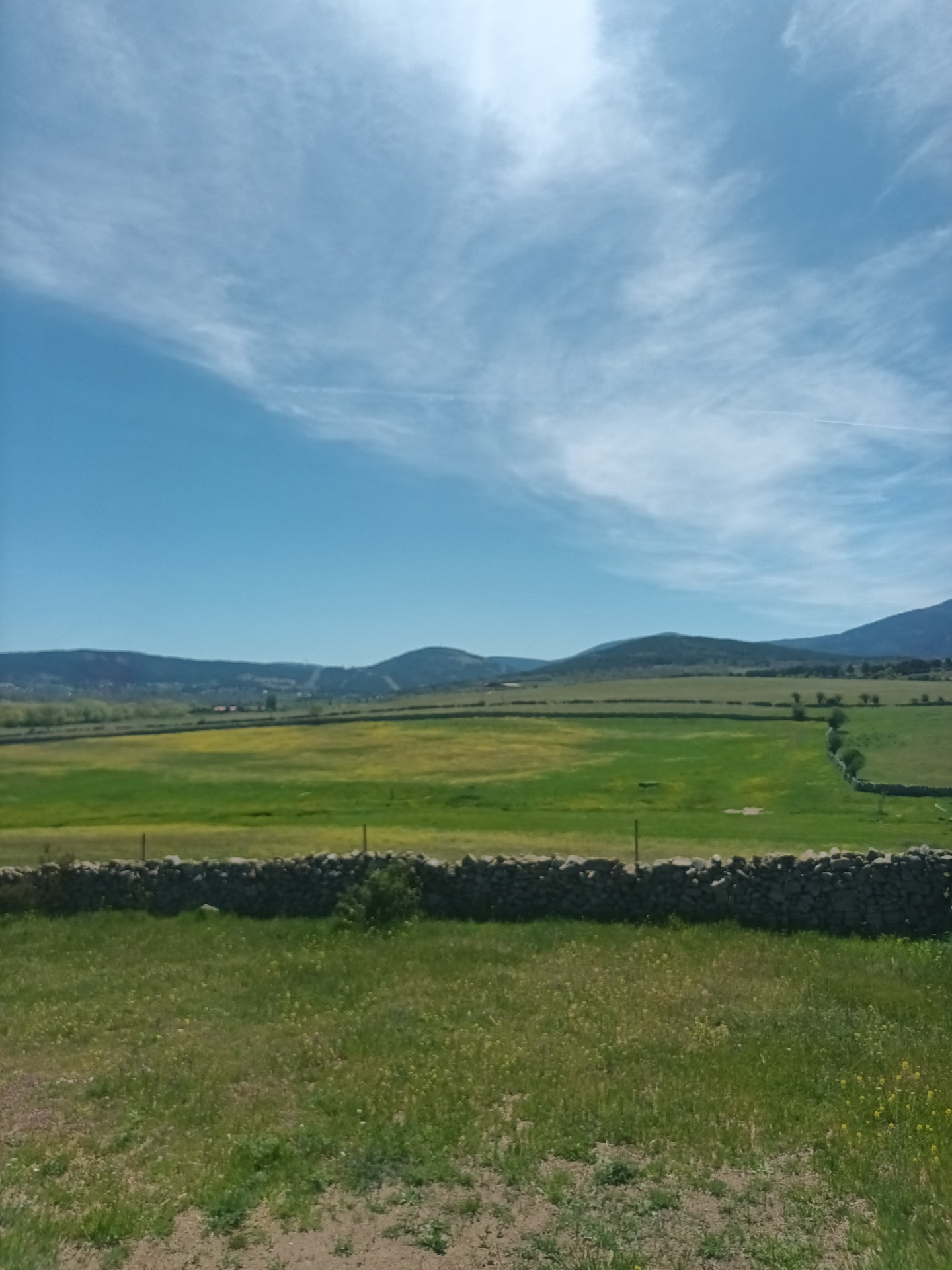
Green meadow in late spring.

== See also ==
- La Pinareja
