= Espinosa de los Caballeros =

- Municipality
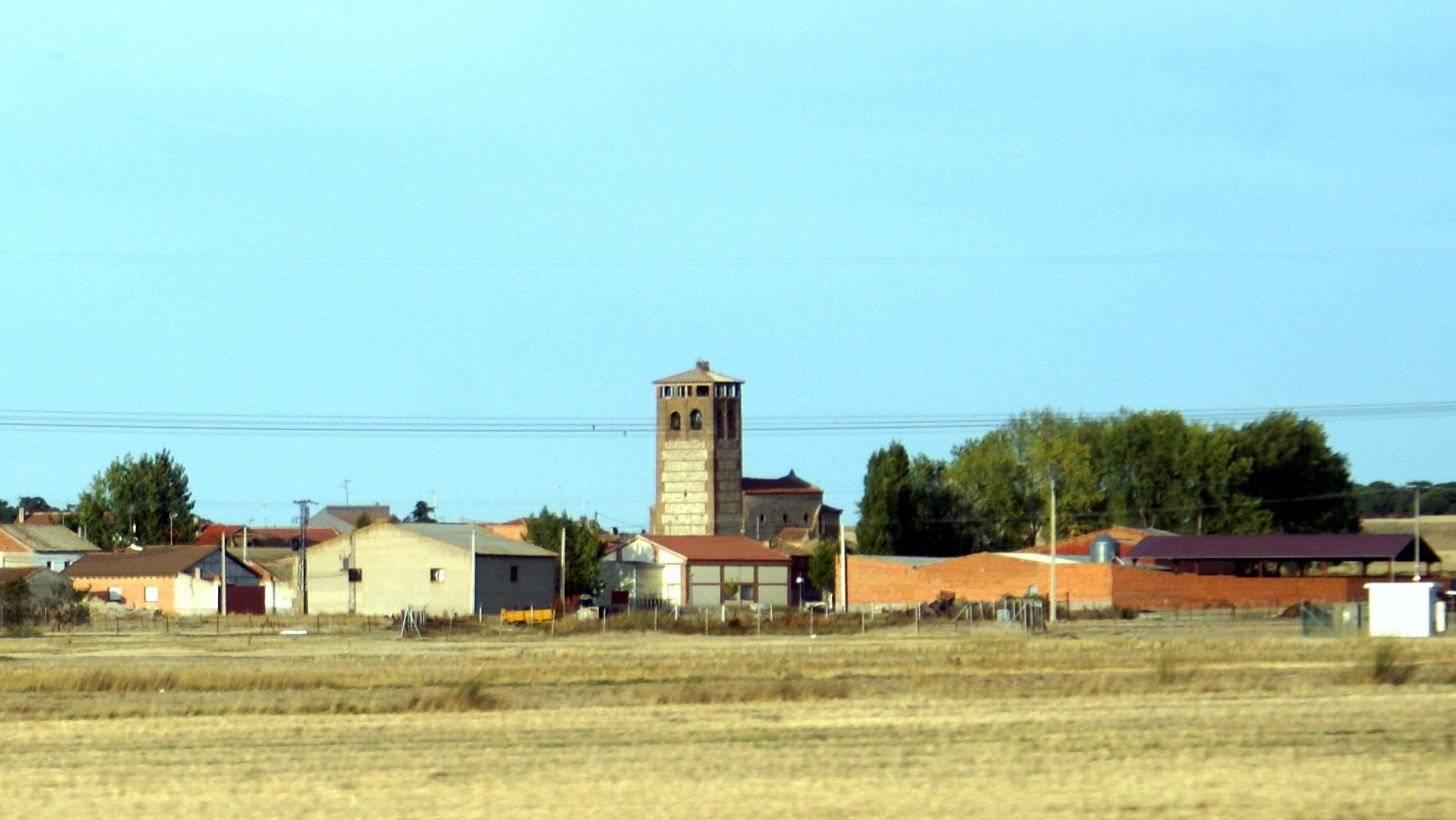
- View of Espinosa de los Caballeros
- Flag Coat of arms
- Location in Spain. Espinosa de los Caballeros (Spain)
- Coordinates: 41°00′32″N 4°39′12″W
- Country: Spain
- Autonomous community: Castile and León
- Province: Ávila
- Municipality: Espinosa de los Caballeros

Area
  - Total: 19.4 km^{2} (7.5 sq mi)
- Elevation: 858 m (2,815 ft)

Population (2025-01-01)
  - Total: 104
  - Density: 5.36/km^{2} (13.9/sq mi)
- Time zone: UTC+1 (CET)
  - Summer (DST): UTC+2 (CEST)
- Website: Official website

Espinosa de los Caballeros is a municipality located in the province of Ávila, Castile and León, Spain Located northeast of the province of Avila, is in an agricultural landscape, bounded on the north by Arévalo, and close to Adanero.

== History ==
This small town in the district of La Morana, is known for the important role that the place had in the times of the Templars, and is also one of the most important place for the so-called commoner. Hence the name the area "Tierra Comunera."

== Population ==
Historical population
Year	Pop.	±% p.a.
2023	102	—
2024	97	−4.90%
2025	104	+7.22%
Source: INE
