= San Rafael (El Espinar) =

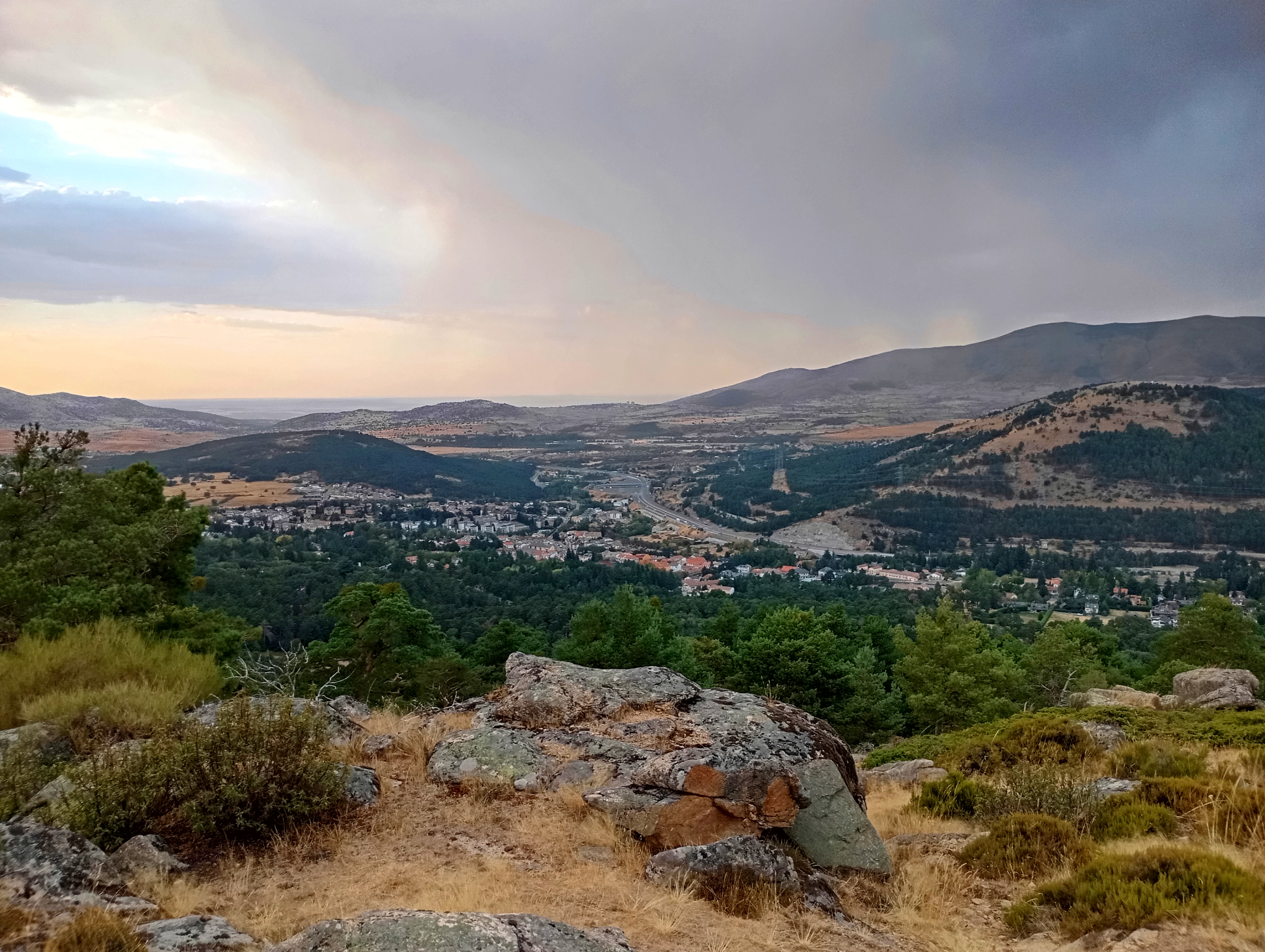
- Interactive map of San Rafael
- Coordinates: 40.71359°N 4.18961°W
- Country: Spain
- Region: Castile and Leon
- Province: Province of Segovia
- Established: 1790
- Demonym: Sanrafaeleños/as
- Time zone: UTC+1 (CET)
  - Summer (DST): UTC+2 (CEST)
- Postal code: 40410

San Rafael is one of the four population centres of the municipality of El Espinar, in the Spanish province of Segovia.

== History ==
It is estimated that its foundation took place in 1790 at the former unpaved crossroads of the one which linked Madrid to La Coruña with another one that headed north towards Segovia, in what is known today as Plaza de Castilla. In its early days, the area was colloquially referred to as La Fondilla due to the presence of an inn serving travellers along these routes.

== Geography ==
San Rafael is situated in the southern bank of the Gudillos river, a tributary of the Moros river. It is bordered to the northeast by the Cabeza Reina mountain; to the east, by the Guadarrama Pass; to the south, by the mountains of Cabeza Líjar and Cueva Valiente; and to the northwest, by the small hill of El Estepar. The eastern and southern boundaries of the settlement are surrounded by an extensive pine forest.

== See also ==
- List of municipalities in Segovia
