= La Estación de El Espinar =

- Interactive map of La Estación de El Espinar
- Coordinates: 40.74038°N 4.18688°W
- Country: Spain
- Region: Castile and Leon
- Province: Province of Segovia
- Established: 1888
- Demonym: Espinariegos/as
- Time zone: UTC+1 (CET)
  - Summer (DST): UTC+2 (CEST)
- Postal code: 40400

La Estación de El Espinar is one of the four population centres that is included in the municipality of El Espinar. It belongs as well to the province of Segovia and to the autonomous community of Castile and Leon in the country of Spain.

== Geography ==
The Moros river passes through the northern limit and the western slope of the nearby Cabeza Reina mountain meets the easternmost streets. The natural swimming pool of La Panera is located about two kilometres northeast by following the river. It is bordered by the south and by the west with the AP-6 motorway and the N-603 main road, respectively.

== History ==
The beginning of this population centre can be tracked back in 1888 when the railway between Segovia, Collado Villalba and Madrid was started-up. The first houses were built at the eastern side of the railway, and then it expanded southeast. The western side of the railway has less houses, and in the early 19th century a wood company was created only 30 metres west of the current train station. This wood company was the first one of the entire municipality of El Espinar. Although it was closed down in the late 1970s, the smokestack is still there.

== See also ==
List of municipalities in Segovia
