= Voltoya River =

River in Spain

Coordinates: 41°13′17″N 4°31′46″W

Voltoya
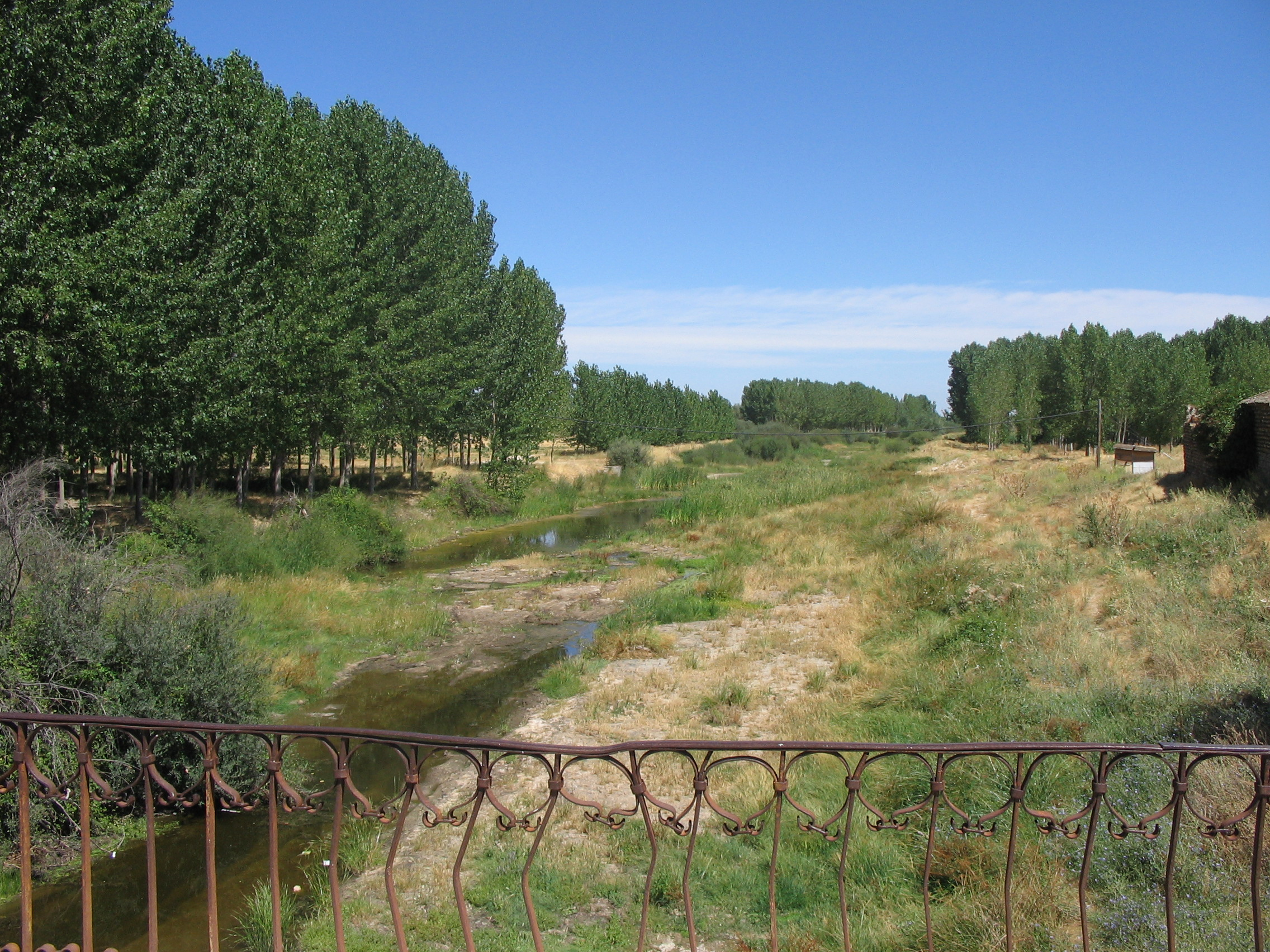
- Voltoya near Juarros de Voltoya

The Voltoya is a river in Spain. It is a tributary river of Eresma River, which in turn is a tributary of the Adaja River that emerges from the Douro River. It starts in the mountains of Guadarrama and Malagón. The water from Dehesa de la Cepeda, enclave of the city of Madrid, and the Azálvaro Field also flow into the Voltoya. It runs through the Castilian-Leonese provinces of Ávila and Segovia. Its mouth is in Coca (Segovia). The Serones Reservoir, which supplies drinking water to the city of Ávila, is located on the Voltoya. Tributaries of the Voltoya on the left are the Tuerto, Ciervos or de Mediana rivers, which in turn receive the waters of the Cortos and the Saornil streams. It receives the waters of the Cardeña river and the Magdalena stream. The Torrelara reservoir, near Peromingo, is located on these. The N-110 and the AP-51 cross the river over concrete bridges. In the past a stone bridge of a single arch with granite keystones was used as a crossing. Further downstream the A-6 and the N-VI are near Coto de Puenteviejo. There it leaves the province of Ávila and enters that of Segovia, to pass through Juarros de Voltoya and the Nava de la Asunción.
