= La Pinareja =

Mountain in Spain

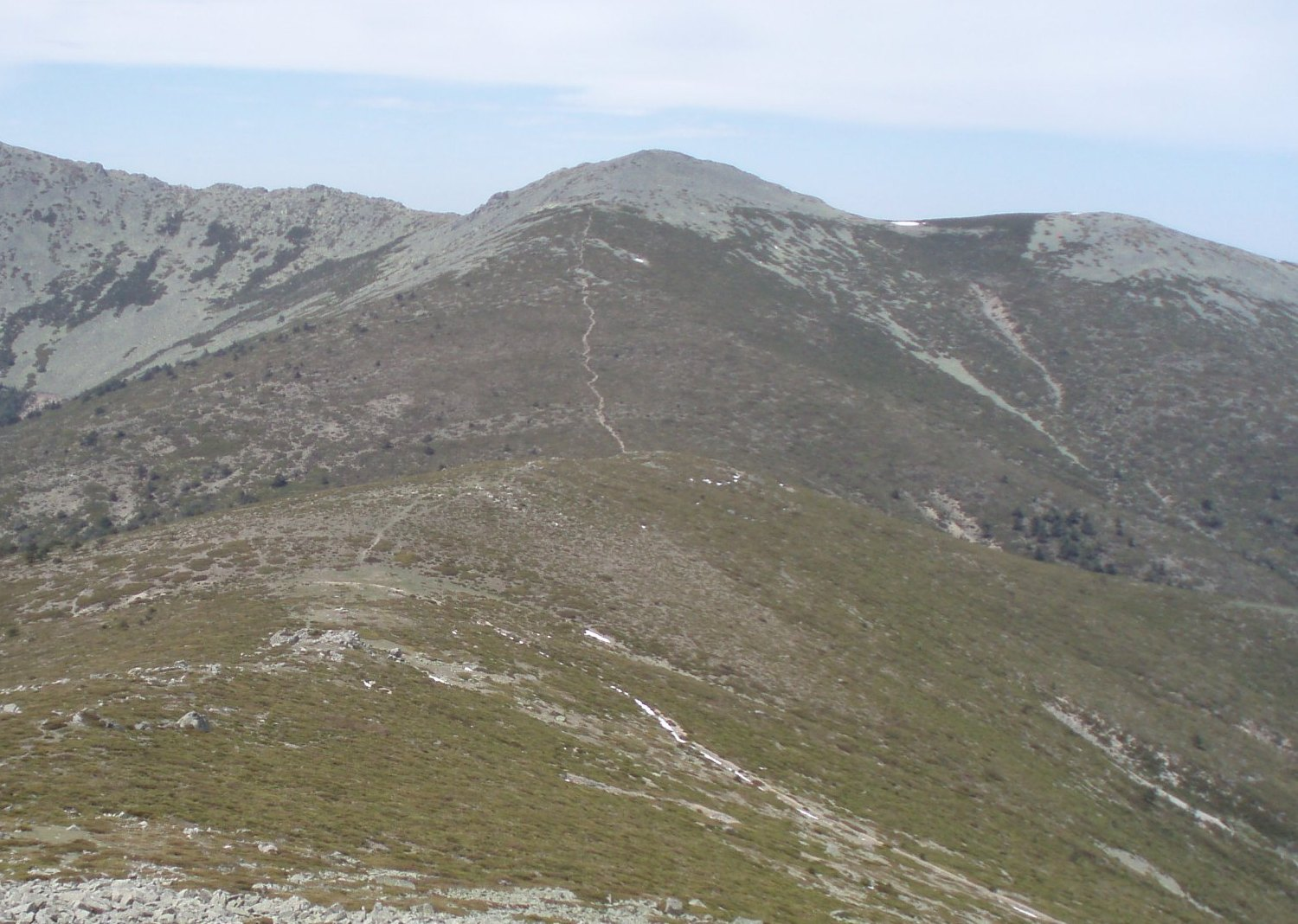
- La Pinareja from the Montón de Trigo

Highest point
- Elevation: 2,197 m (7,208 ft)
- Prominence: 401 m (1,316 ft)
- Coordinates: 40°48′32″N 04°05′32″W

Geography
- Location within Spain
- Location: Segovia Province, Castile and León
- Parent range: La Mujer Muerta (Sistema Central)

Geology
- Mountain type: granite

Climbing
- First ascent: ancestral
- Easiest route: hike

La Pinareja is a 2,197-metre-high (7,208 ft) mountain in Spain.

== Geography ==
The mountain is located in El Espinar municipality (Segovia Province), in the south-eastern part of the autonomous community of Castile and León. It's the highest peak of the mountain range called La Mujer Muerta. From its north face a large part of the Segovia's plain can be seen, while its eastern slopes look towards Valsaín and Río Moros valleys.

== Access to the summit ==
The summit can be accessed from Cercedilla through the mountain pass of Puerto de La Fuenfría (1796 m), from Navas de Riofrío (1267 m) or from the village of Revenga (1132 m). During summer these ways can be easily followed, but in winter abundant snow and ice can require crampons and ice axe.

== See also ==
- Sistema Central
