= Guadarrama Pass =

- Puerto de Guadarrama; Alto del León
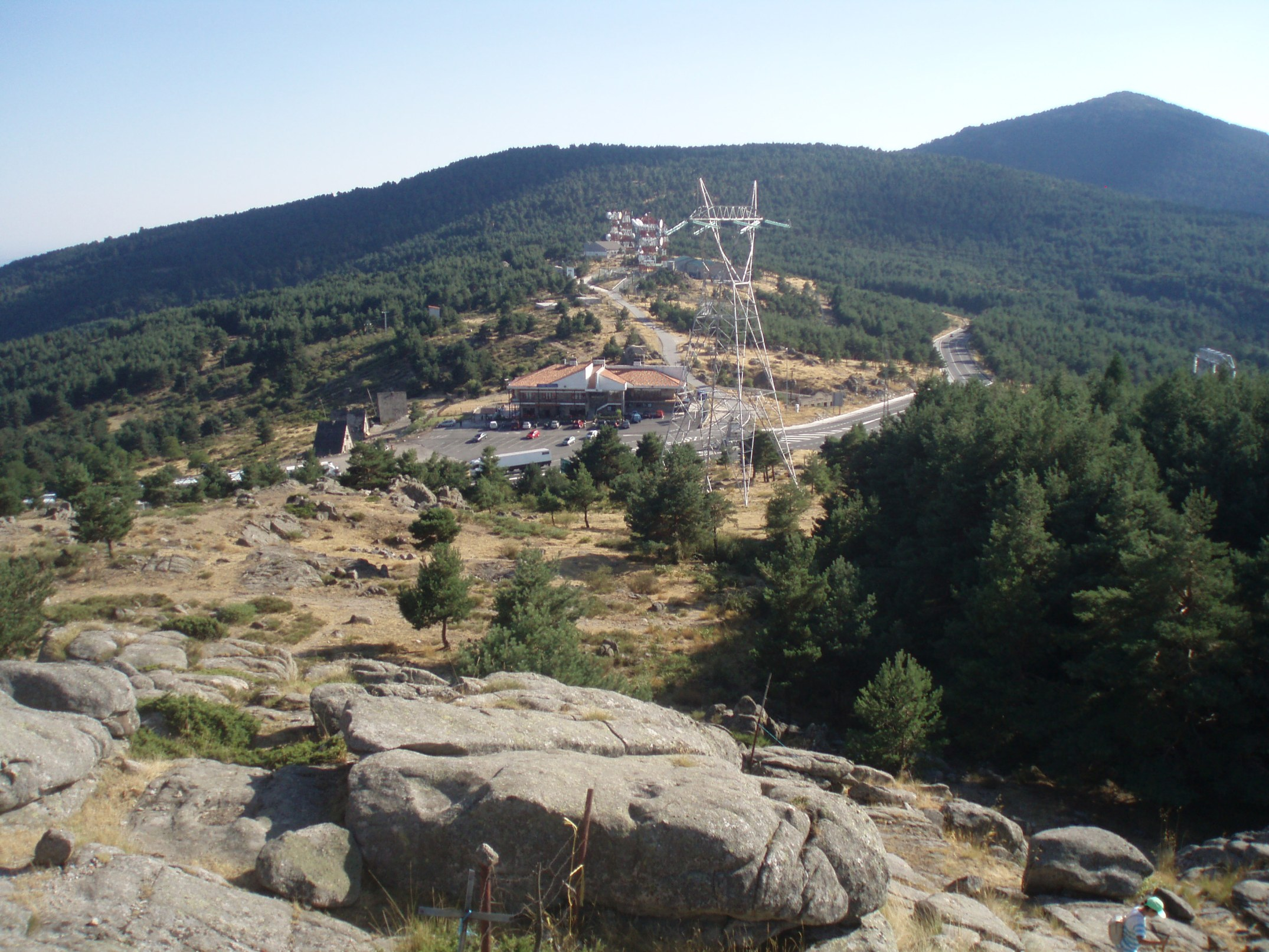
- The cross at Guadarrama Pass.

- Location within Spain
- Elevation: 1,115 metres (3,658 ft)

Third Approach
- Location: Segovia Province, Madrid Province
- Range: Sierra de Guadarrama, Central System
- Coordinates: 40°42′36″N 4°8′25″W

The Guadarrama Pass (Spanish: Puerto de Guadarrama), also known as Alto del León, is a mountain pass in Spain. It is located in the Sierra de Guadarrama, part of the Sistema Central system of ranges. Historically it has been an important communication line between Madrid and the North of Spain.

== Geography ==
This pass is part of San Rafael in El Espinar municipal term, Segovia Province, on its northern side and Guadarrama, Madrid Province, on its southern side. It is located in the southern slopes of the 1,556 m (5,105 ft) high Cerro de la Sevillana, between the 1,824 m (5,984 ft) high Cabeza Líjar and 1,945 m (6,381 ft) high La Peñota peaks.

The Guadarrama Pass is an important communication line between Segovia Province and the Madrid area through the N-VI highway between Madrid and Corunna.

== History ==
There are remains of Spanish Civil War bunkers and trenches in the area of the pass. The rebel faction took the northern side of the range after the Battle of Guadarrama and the Second Division of the Spanish Republican Army operated in the area between December 1936 and March 1939.

== See also ==
- Central System
