= Autopista AP-6 =

Road in Spain

Autopista AP-6
- Autopista del Noroeste (Northwest Tollway/Toll paying motorway)
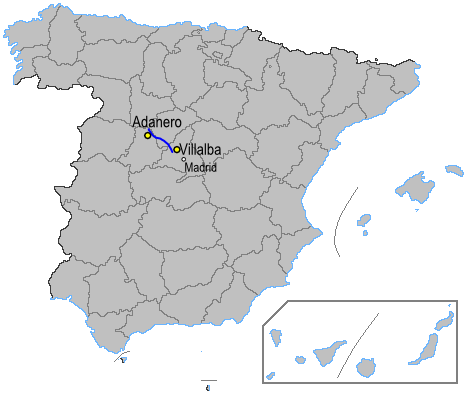

Route information
- Length: 70 km (43 mi)

Major junctions
- From: Collado Villalba
- To: Adanero

Location
- Country: Spain

Highway system
- Highways in Spain; Autopistas and autovías; National Roads

The Autopista AP-6 (also called Autopista del Noroeste or Carretera de La Coruña (Madrid-La Coruña National Road or N-VI) is a part of the Spanish A-6 Autopista del Noroeste starting at Las Rozas de Madrid and finished at Adanero. Between Las Rozas and Collado Villalba, is a freeway. All of it is a Free/tollway or a Motorway. Las Rozas-Collado Villalba is not a Spanish "Autovía" autopista toll route which starts in Collado Villalba and ends in Adanero (Ávila). The portion, between Las Rozas and Collado Villalba, forms part of it, but without toll. Madrid-Las Rozas, Adanero-Arteixo (province of La Coruña) on the same route is a Spanish "autovía" not a free/tollway, motorway, either a two-lane road. "Autovia" is in the middle between both road types, but the crosses always are with bridges like in the motorways/toll/freeway.

The first kilometres of freeway/free motorway between Las Rozas and Collado Villalba were the first kilometres of freeway/motorway in Spain since 1967.

The Autopista AP-6; with toll, (from Collado Villalba km 40 to Adanero km 109 from Madrid) has a total length of 70 km of tollway/toll paying motorway, and the Autopista del Noroeste, entire, 92 km, with Las Rozas-Villalba's freeway.
