= Juarros de Voltoya =

- Municipality
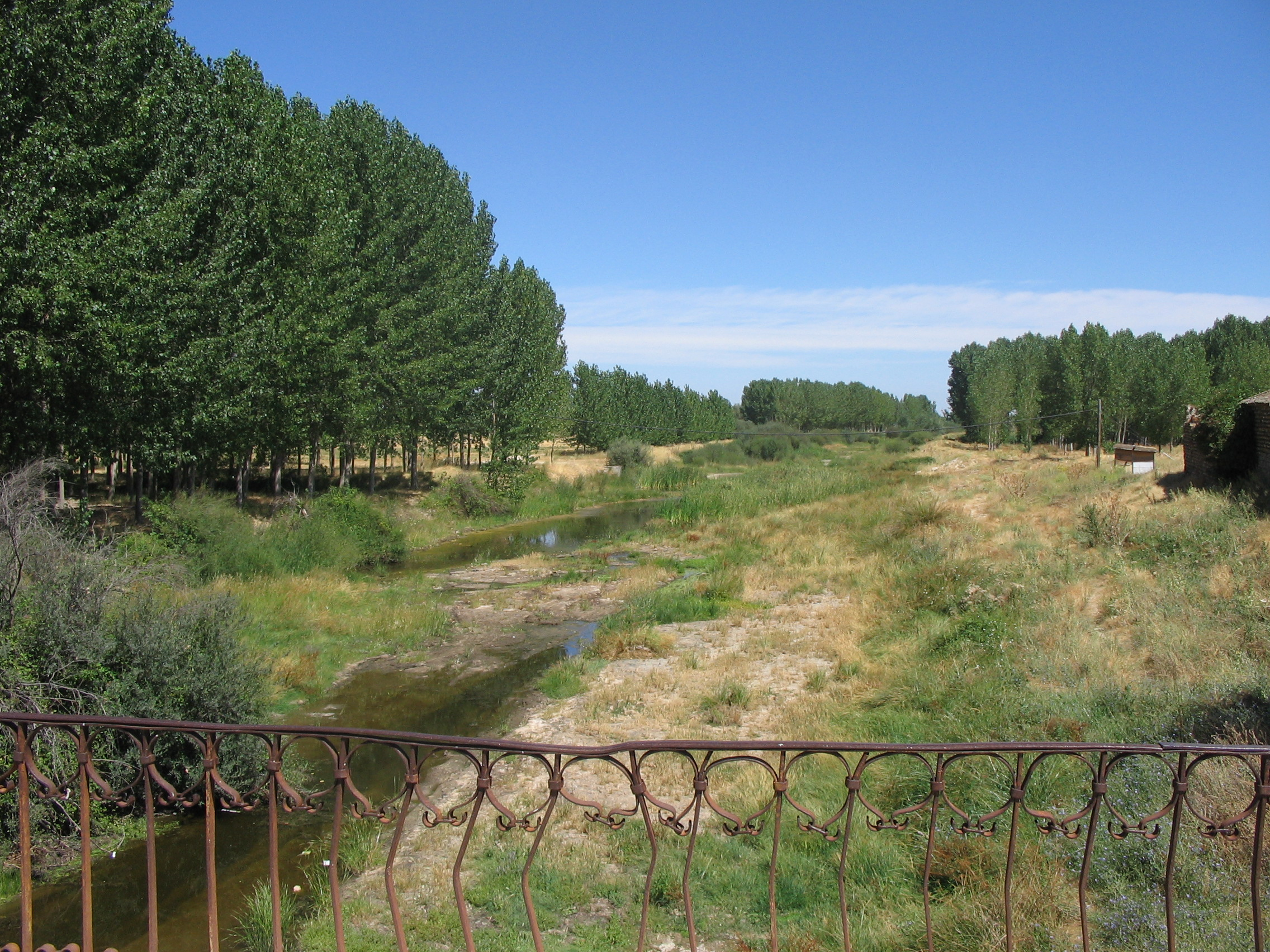

- Flag Coat of arms

- Location in Spain. Juarros de Voltoya (Spain)
- Coordinates: 41°01′50″N 4°31′08″W
- Country: Spain
- Autonomous community: Castile and León
- Province: Segovia
- Municipality: Juarros de Voltoya

Area
  - Total: 21 km^{2} (8.1 sq mi)

Population (2025-01-01)
  - Total: 185
  - Density: 8.8/km^{2} (23/sq mi)
- Time zone: UTC+1 (CET)
  - Summer (DST): UTC+2 (CEST)
- Website: Official website

Juarros de Voltoya is a municipality located in the province of Segovia, Castile and León, Spain. According to the 2004 census (INE), the municipality has a population of 272 inhabitants.
