= La Peñota =

Mountain in Spain

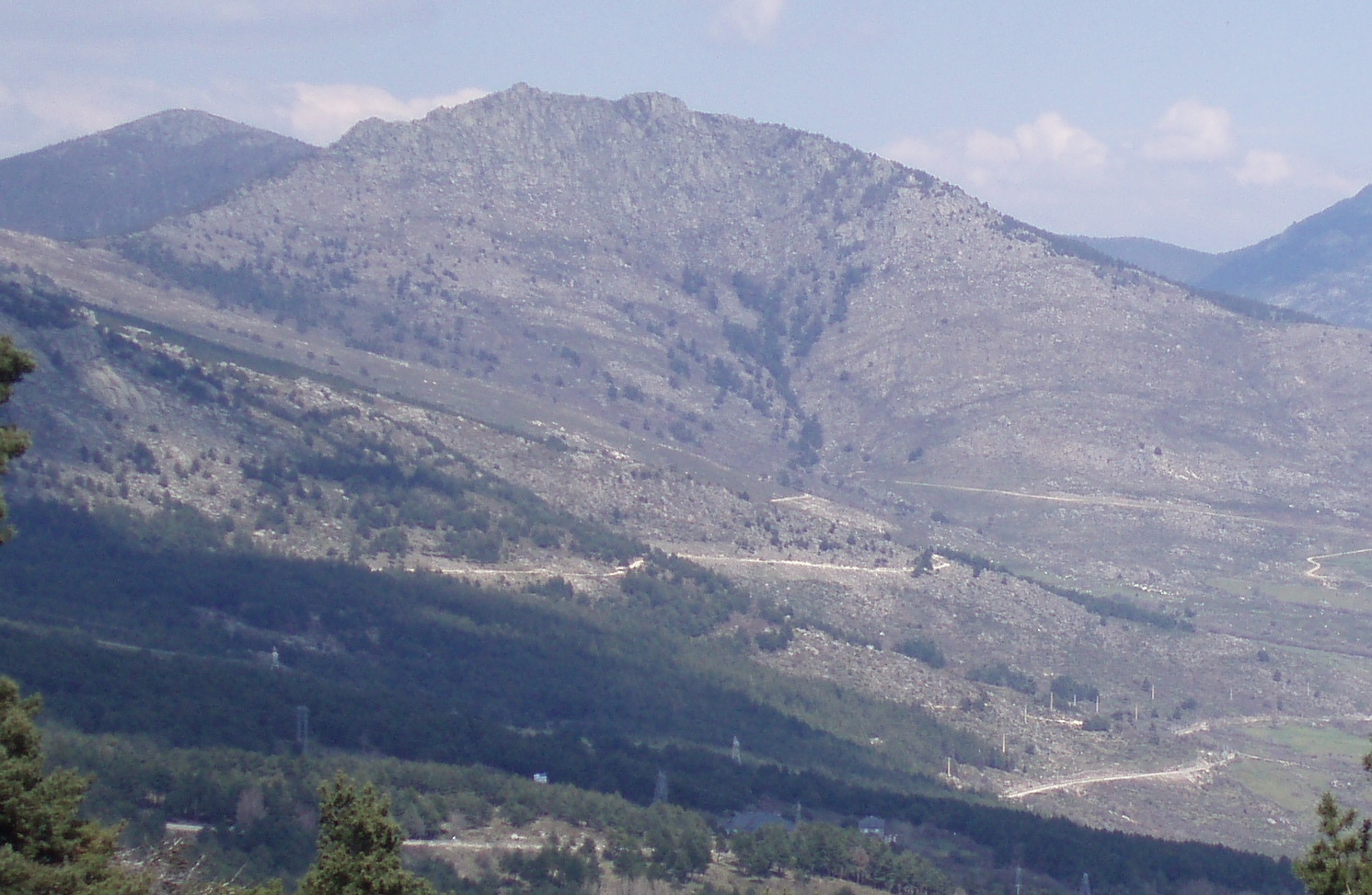

Highest point
- Elevation: 1,945 m (6,381 ft)
- Coordinates: 40°44′53″N 4°5′57″W

Geography
- Location within Spain
- Location: El Espinar, Los Molinos
- Parent range: Sierra de Guadarrama

La Peñota (Spanish pronunciation: [la peˈɲota]) is a mountain of the Sierra de Guadarrama in the centre of the Iberian Peninsula.

The peak tops at 1,945 metres above sea level. It forms part of the border between the Spanish provinces of Segovia and Madrid, most specifically, the municipalities of El Espinar and Los Molinos, respectively.
