= Adanero =

- Municipality
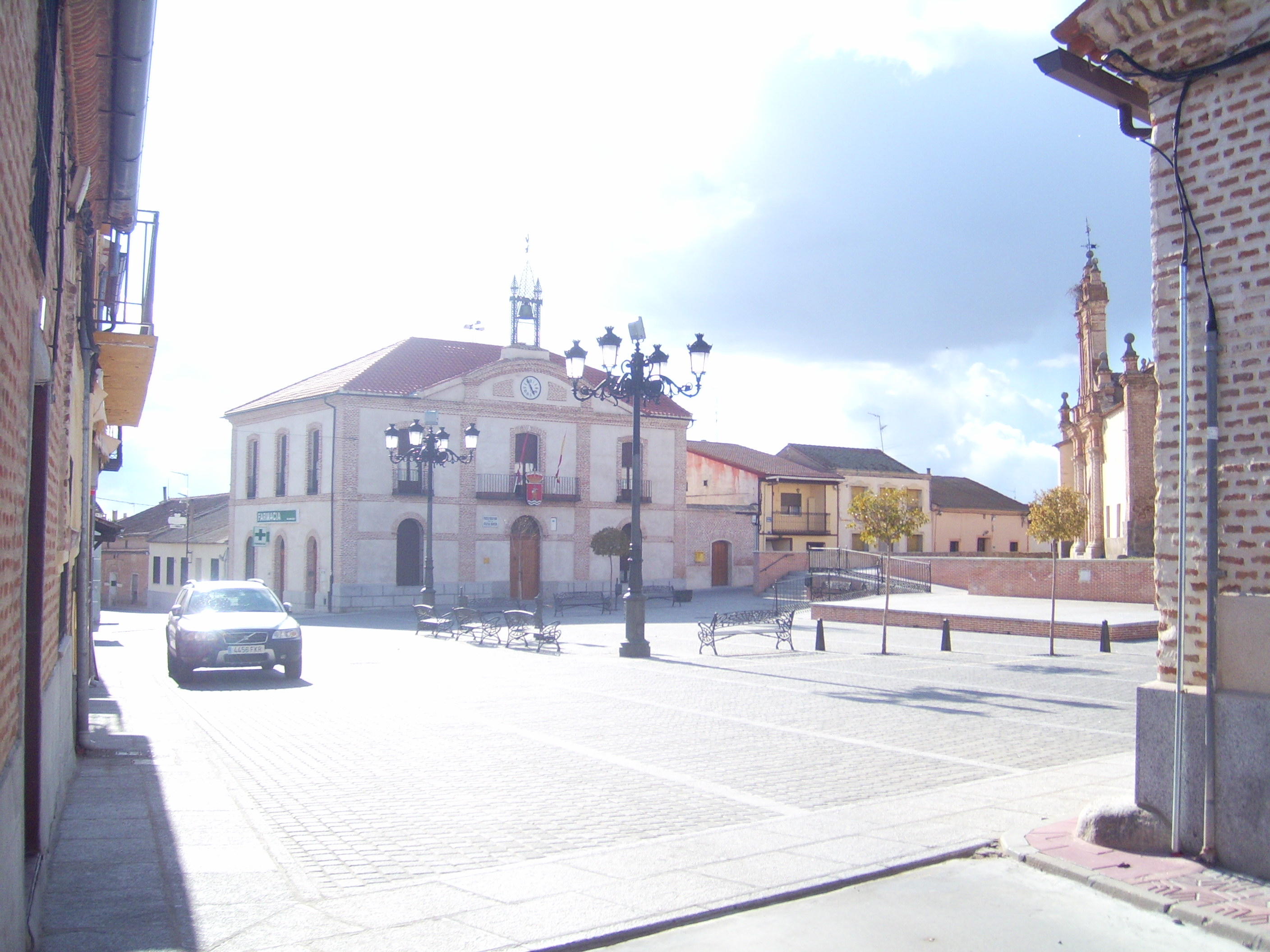
- Plaza mayor

- Flag Coat of arms

- Extension of the municipal term within the province of Ávila

- Location in Spain. Adanero (Spain)
- Coordinates: 40°56′45″N 4°36′24″W
- Country: Spain
- Autonomous community: Castile and León
- Province: Ávila

Area
  - Total: 31.42 km^{2} (12.13 sq mi)
- Elevation: 910 m (2,990 ft)

Population (2025-01-01)
  - Total: 207
  - Density: 6.59/km^{2} (17.1/sq mi)
- Time zone: UTC+1 (CET)
  - Summer (DST): UTC+2 (CEST)
- Website: Official website

Adanero is a municipality of Spain located in the province of Ávila, Castile and León. The municipality has a total area of 31.42 km^{2} and, as of 2025, a registered population of 207, according to the INE.

== History ==
Adanero was granted the privilege of town (villa) in 1630, during the reign of Philip IV, becoming independent from the land of Ávila.

== Population ==
Historical population
Year	Pop.	±% p.a.
2023	204	—
2024	208	+1.96%
2025	207	−0.48%
Source: INE
