= List of teams and cyclists in the 1971 Giro d'Italia =

The 1971 Giro d'Italia was the 54th edition of the Giro d'Italia, one of cycling's Grand Tours. The field consisted of 100 riders, and 75 riders finished the race.

== By rider ==
Legend
No.	Starting number worn by the rider during the Giro
Pos.	Position in the general classification
DNF	Denotes a rider who did not finish

No.	Name	Nationality	Team	Ref
1	Pietro Dallai	Italy	Cosatto	
2	Giuseppe De Simone	Italy	Cosatto	
3	Cipriano Chemello	Italy	Cosatto	
4	Fabrizio Fabbri	Italy	Cosatto	
5	Mario Lanzafame	Italy	Cosatto	
6	Enrico Maggioni	Italy	Cosatto	
7	Wladimiro Panizza	Italy	Cosatto	
8	Piero Poloni	Italy	Cosatto	
9	Selvino Poloni	Italy	Cosatto	
10	Roberto Sorlini	Italy	Cosatto	
11	Patrick Sercu	Belgium	Dreher	
12	Ole Ritter	Denmark	Dreher	
13	Pierfranco Vianelli	Italy	Dreher	
14	Adriano Passuello	Italy	Dreher	
15	Silvano Schiavon	Italy	Dreher	
16	Attilio Rota	Italy	Dreher	
17	Oliviero Morotti	Italy	Dreher	
18	Giuseppe Fezzardi	Italy	Dreher	
19	Pietro Di Caterina	Italy	Dreher	
20	Vittorio Urbani	Italy	Dreher	
21	Pietro Campagnari	Italy	Ferretti	
22	Lino Farisato	Italy	Ferretti	
23	Gösta Pettersson	Sweden	Ferretti	
24	Erik Pettersson	Sweden	Ferretti	
25	Mauro Simonetti	Italy	Ferretti	
26	Albert Van Vlierberghe	Belgium	Ferretti	
27	Italo Zilioli	Italy	Ferretti	
28	Sture Pettersson	Sweden	Ferretti	
29	Mario Anni	Italy	Ferretti	
30	Wilmo Francioni	Italy	Ferretti	
31	Franco Bitossi	Italy	Filotex	
32	Marcello Bergamo	Italy	Filotex	
33	Giovanni Cavalcanti	Italy	Filotex	
34	Arnaldo Caverzasi	Italy	Filotex	
35	Ugo Colombo	Italy	Filotex	
36	Alberto Della Torre	Italy	Filotex	
37	Renato Laghi	Italy	Filotex	
38	Giuseppe Rosolen	Italy	Filotex	
39	Donato Giuliani	Italy	Filotex	
40	Antonio Salutini	Italy	Filotex	
41	Aldo Moser	Italy	G.B.C.	
42	Diego Moser	Italy	G.B.C.	
43	Mario Nicoletti	Italy	G.B.C.	
44	Luigi Sgarbozza	Italy	G.B.C.	
45	Stéfano Benvenuti	Italy	G.B.C.	
46	Lucillo Lievore	Italy	G.B.C.	
47	Luciano Luciani	Italy	G.B.C.	
48	Louis Pfenninger	Switzerland	G.B.C.	
49	Bernard Vifian	Switzerland	G.B.C.	
50	Arturo Pecchielan	Italy	G.B.C.	
51	José Luis Uribezubia	Spain	Kas–Kaskol	
52	José Manuel Fuente	Spain	Kas–Kaskol	
53	Francisco Gabica	Spain	Kas–Kaskol	
54	Francisco Galdós	Spain	Kas–Kaskol	
55	Andrés Gandarias	Spain	Kas–Kaskol	
56	Domingo Perurena	Spain	Kas–Kaskol	
57	Santiago Lazcano	Spain	Kas–Kaskol	
58	Vicente López Carril	Spain	Kas–Kaskol	
59	Jesús Manzaneque	Spain	Kas–Kaskol	
60	Luis Zubero	Spain	Kas–Kaskol	
61	Georges Pintens	Belgium	Hertekamp–Magniflex	
62	Roger Cooreman	Belgium	Hertekamp–Magniflex	
63	Ernie De Blaere	Belgium	Hertekamp–Magniflex	
64	Sigfrido Fontanelli	Italy	Hertekamp–Magniflex	
65	André Poppe	Belgium	Hertekamp–Magniflex	
66	Renzo Panicagli	Italy	Hertekamp–Magniflex	
67	Silvano Ravagli	Italy	Hertekamp–Magniflex	
68	Eddy Reyniers	Belgium	Hertekamp–Magniflex	
69	Noël Van Clooster	Belgium	Hertekamp–Magniflex	
70	Giancarlo Tartoni	Italy	Hertekamp–Magniflex	
71	Giancarlo Bellini	Italy	Molteni	
72	Marino Basso	Italy	Molteni	
73	Luigi Castelletti	Italy	Molteni	
74	Giacinto Santambrogio	Italy	Molteni	
75	Guerrino Tosello	Italy	Molteni	
76	Romano Tumellero	Italy	Molteni	
77	Giorgio Favaro	Italy	Molteni	
78	Roger Swerts	Belgium	Molteni	
79	Herman Van Springel	Belgium	Molteni	
80	Marinus Wagtmans	Netherlands	Molteni	
81	Emilio Casalini	Italy	Salvarani	
82	Ottavio Crepaldi	Italy	Salvarani	
83	Felice Gimondi	Italy	Salvarani	
84	Ercole Gualazzini	Italy	Salvarani	
85	Pietro Guerra	Italy	Salvarani	
86	Antoine Houbrechts	Belgium	Salvarani	
87	Primo Mori	Italy	Salvarani	
88	Gianni Motta	Italy	Salvarani	
89	Roberto Poggiali	Italy	Salvarani	
90	Dino Zandegù	Italy	Salvarani	
91	Franco Balmamion	Italy	Scic	
92	Davide Boifava	Italy	Scic	
93	Carlo Chiappano	Italy	Scic	
94	Michele Dancelli	Italy	Scic	
95	Claudio Michelotto	Italy	Scic	
96	Franco Mori	Italy	Scic	
97	Enrico Paolini	Italy	Scic	
98	Giancarlo Polidori	Italy	Scic	
99	Attilio Benfatto	Italy	Scic	
100	Angelo Bassini	Italy	Scic	
