= 1971 Giro d'Italia, Stage 11 to Stage 20b =

Cycling race stages

The 1971 Giro d'Italia was the 54th edition of the Giro d'Italia, one of cycling's Grand Tours. The Giro began with a prologue team time trial in Lecce on 20 May, and Stage 11 occurred on 31 May with a stage from Sestola. The race finished in Milan on 10 June.

== Stage 11 ==
31 May 1971 — Sestola to Mantua, 199 km (124 mi)

Stage 11 result

Rank	Rider	Team	Time
1	Marino Basso (ITA)	Molteni	4h 51' 17"
2	Patrick Sercu (BEL)	Dreher	s.t.
3	Noël Van Clooster (BEL)	Hertekamp–Magniflex	s.t.
4	Albert Van Vlierberghe (BEL)	Ferretti	s.t.
5	Luigi Sgarbozza (ITA)	G.B.C.	s.t.
6	Sture Pettersson (SWE)	Ferretti	s.t.
7	Dino Zandegù (ITA)	Salvarani	s.t.
8	Guerrino Tosello (ITA)	Molteni	s.t.
9	Mauro Simonetti (ITA)	Ferretti	s.t.
10	Davide Boifava (ITA)	Scic	s.t.

General classification after Stage 11

Rank	Rider	Team	Time
1	Claudio Michelotto (ITA)	Scic	56h 39' 08"
2	Aldo Moser (ITA)	G.B.C.	+ 2' 15"
3	Enrico Paolini (ITA)	Scic	+ 4' 55"
4	Ugo Colombo (ITA)	Filotex	+ 5' 33"
5	Gösta Pettersson (SWE)	Ferretti	+ 6' 20"
6	Herman Van Springel (BEL)	Molteni	+ 8' 18"
7	Francisco Galdós (ESP)	Kas–Kaskol	+ 8' 58"
8	Antoine Houbrechts (BEL)	Salvarani	+ 8' 59"
9	Silvano Schiavon (ITA)	Dreher	+ 9' 29"
10			

== Rest day ==
1 June 1971

== Stage 12 ==
2 June 1971 — Desenzano del Garda to Serniga di Salò, 28 km (17 mi) (ITT)

Stage 12 result

Rank	Rider	Team	Time
1	Davide Boifava (ITA)	Scic	43' 10"
2	Ole Ritter (DEN)	Dreher	+ 7"
3	Felice Gimondi (ITA)	Salvarani	+ 33"
4	Gösta Pettersson (SWE)	Ferretti	+ 1' 03"
5	Herman Van Springel (BEL)	Molteni	+ 1' 16"
6	Gianni Motta (ITA)	Salvarani	+ 1' 34"
7	Louis Pfenninger (SUI)	G.B.C.	+ 1' 39"
8	Bernard Vifian (SUI)	G.B.C.	+ 1' 42"
9	Marinus Wagtmans (NED)	Molteni	+ 1' 43"
10	Giovanni Cavalcanti (ITA)	Filotex	+ 1' 44"

General classification after Stage 12

Rank	Rider	Team	Time
1	Claudio Michelotto (ITA)	Scic	57h 25' 14"
2	Aldo Moser (ITA)	G.B.C.	+ 2' 13"
3	Gösta Pettersson (SWE)	Ferretti	+ 4' 37"
4	Ugo Colombo (ITA)	Filotex	+ 5' 36"
5	Enrico Paolini (ITA)	Scic	+ 6' 27"
6	Herman Van Springel (BEL)	Molteni	+ 6' 38"
7	Antoine Houbrechts (BEL)	Salvarani	+ 7' 52"
8	Francisco Galdós (ESP)	Kas–Kaskol	+ 8' 06"
9	Marinus Wagtmans (NED)	Molteni	+ 8' 34"
10	Silvano Schiavon (ITA)	Dreher	+ 9' 39"

== Stage 13 ==
3 June 1971 — Salò to Sottomarina di Chioggia, 218 km (135 mi)

Stage 13 result

Rank	Rider	Team	Time
1	Patrick Sercu (BEL)	Dreher	5h 41' 50"
2	Marino Basso (ITA)	Molteni	s.t.
3	Albert Van Vlierberghe (BEL)	Ferretti	s.t.
4	Franco Bitossi (ITA)	Filotex	s.t.
5	Luigi Sgarbozza (ITA)	G.B.C.	s.t.
6	Dino Zandegù (ITA)	Salvarani	s.t.
7	Felice Gimondi (ITA)	Salvarani	s.t.
8	Ole Ritter (DEN)	Dreher	s.t.
9	Mauro Simonetti (ITA)	Ferretti	s.t.
10	Marinus Wagtmans (NED)	Molteni	s.t.

General classification after Stage 13

Rank	Rider	Team	Time
1	Claudio Michelotto (ITA)	Scic	63h 07' 04"
2	Aldo Moser (ITA)	G.B.C.	+ 2' 18"
3	Gösta Pettersson (SWE)	Ferretti	+ 4' 37"
4	Ugo Colombo (ITA)	Filotex	+ 5' 36"
5	Enrico Paolini (ITA)	Scic	+ 6' 27"
6	Herman Van Springel (BEL)	Molteni	+ 6' 38"
7	Antoine Houbrechts (BEL)	Salvarani	+ 7' 52"
8	Francisco Galdós (ESP)	Kas–Kaskol	+ 8' 06"
9	Marinus Wagtmans (NED)	Molteni	+ 8' 34"
10	Silvano Schiavon (ITA)	Dreher	+ 9' 39"

== Stage 14 ==
4 June 1971 — Chioggia to Bibione, 170 km (110 mi)

Stage 14 result

Rank	Rider	Team	Time
1	Patrick Sercu (BEL)	Dreher	3h 56' 37"
2	Marino Basso (ITA)	Molteni	s.t.
3	Albert Van Vlierberghe (BEL)	Ferretti	s.t.
4	Michele Dancelli (ITA)	Scic	s.t.
5	Franco Bitossi (ITA)	Filotex	s.t.
6	Gianni Motta (ITA)	Salvarani	s.t.
7	Giancarlo Polidori (ITA)	Scic	s.t.
8	Dino Zandegù (ITA)	Salvarani	s.t.
9	Marinus Wagtmans (NED)	Molteni	s.t.
10	Luigi Sgarbozza (ITA)	G.B.C.	s.t.

General classification after Stage 14

Rank	Rider	Team	Time
1	Claudio Michelotto (ITA)	Scic	67h 03' 41"
2	Aldo Moser (ITA)	G.B.C.	+ 2' 18"
3	Gösta Pettersson (SWE)	Ferretti	+ 4' 37"
4	Ugo Colombo (ITA)	Filotex	+ 5' 36"
5	Enrico Paolini (ITA)	Scic	+ 6' 27"
6	Herman Van Springel (BEL)	Molteni	+ 6' 38"
7	Antoine Houbrechts (BEL)	Salvarani	+ 7' 52"
8	Francisco Galdós (ESP)	Kas–Kaskol	+ 8' 06"
9	Marinus Wagtmans (NED)	Molteni	+ 8' 34"
10	Silvano Schiavon (ITA)	Dreher	+ 9' 39"

== Stage 15 ==
5 June 1971 — Bibione to Ljubljana, 201 km (125 mi)

Stage 15 result

Rank	Rider	Team	Time
1	Franco Bitossi (ITA)	Filotex	5h 09' 34"
2	Patrick Sercu (BEL)	Dreher	+ 18"
3	Domingo Perurena (ESP)	Kas–Kaskol	s.t.
4	Luigi Sgarbozza (ITA)	G.B.C.	s.t.
5	Ole Ritter (DEN)	Dreher	s.t.
6	Dino Zandegù (ITA)	Salvarani	s.t.
7	Albert Van Vlierberghe (BEL)	Ferretti	s.t.
8	Gianni Motta (ITA)	Salvarani	s.t.
9	Noël Van Clooster (BEL)	Hertekamp–Magniflex	s.t.
10	Sture Pettersson (SWE)	Ferretti	s.t.

General classification after Stage 15

Rank	Rider	Team	Time
1	Claudio Michelotto (ITA)	Scic	72h 13' 33"
2	Aldo Moser (ITA)	G.B.C.	+ 2' 18"
3	Gösta Pettersson (SWE)	Ferretti	+ 4' 37"
4	Ugo Colombo (ITA)	Filotex	+ 5' 36"
5	Enrico Paolini (ITA)	Scic	+ 6' 27"
6	Herman Van Springel (BEL)	Molteni	+ 6' 38"
7	Antoine Houbrechts (BEL)	Salvarani	+ 7' 52"
8	Francisco Galdós (ESP)	Kas–Kaskol	+ 8' 06"
9	Marinus Wagtmans (NED)	Molteni	+ 8' 34"
10	Silvano Schiavon (ITA)	Dreher	+ 9' 39"

== Stage 16 ==
6 June 1971 — Ljubljana to Tarvisio, 100 km (62 mi)

Stage 16 result

Rank	Rider	Team	Time
1	Dino Zandegù (ITA)	Salvarani	2h 24' 20"
2	Felice Gimondi (ITA)	Salvarani	s.t.
3	Marino Basso (ITA)	Molteni	s.t.
4	Roger Swerts (BEL)	Molteni	s.t.
5	Albert Van Vlierberghe (BEL)	Ferretti	s.t.
6	Noël Van Clooster (BEL)	Hertekamp–Magniflex	s.t.
7	Arnaldo Caverzasi (ITA)	Filotex	s.t.
8	Enrico Maggioni (ITA)	Cosatto	s.t.
9	Luigi Sgarbozza (ITA)	G.B.C.	s.t.
10	Ole Ritter (DEN)	Dreher	s.t.

General classification after Stage 16

Rank	Rider	Team	Time
1	Claudio Michelotto (ITA)	Scic	74h 37' 53"
2	Aldo Moser (ITA)	G.B.C.	+ 2' 18"
3	Gösta Pettersson (SWE)	Ferretti	+ 4' 37"
4	Ugo Colombo (ITA)	Filotex	+ 5' 36"
5	Enrico Paolini (ITA)	Scic	+ 6' 27"
6	Herman Van Springel (BEL)	Molteni	+ 6' 38"
7	Antoine Houbrechts (BEL)	Salvarani	+ 7' 52"
8	Francisco Galdós (ESP)	Kas–Kaskol	+ 8' 06"
9	Marinus Wagtmans (NED)	Molteni	+ 8' 34"
10	Silvano Schiavon (ITA)	Dreher	+ 9' 29"

== Stage 17 ==
7 June 1971 — Tarvisio to Großglockner, 206 km (128 mi)

Stage 17 result

Rank	Rider	Team	Time
1	Pierfranco Vianelli (ITA)	Dreher	6h 08' 45"
2	Primo Mori (ITA)	Salvarani	+ 1' 09"
3	Giancarlo Polidori (ITA)	Scic	+ 1' 37"
4	André Poppe (BEL)	Hertekamp–Magniflex	+ 2' 30"
5	Gösta Pettersson (SWE)	Ferretti	+ 4' 31"
6	Herman Van Springel (BEL)	Molteni	s.t.
7	Felice Gimondi (ITA)	Salvarani	s.t.
8	Francisco Galdós (ESP)	Kas–Kaskol	s.t.
9	Ugo Colombo (ITA)	Filotex	s.t.
10	Silvano Schiavon (ITA)	Dreher	s.t.

General classification after Stage 17

Rank	Rider	Team	Time
1	Claudio Michelotto (ITA)	Scic	80h 52' 44"
2	Aldo Moser (ITA)	G.B.C.	+ 1' 22"
3	Gösta Pettersson (SWE)	Ferretti	+ 2' 02"
4	Ugo Colombo (ITA)	Filotex	+ 3' 01"
5	Herman Van Springel (BEL)	Molteni	+ 4' 03"
6	Francisco Galdós (ESP)	Kas–Kaskol	+ 5' 31"
7	Enrico Paolini (ITA)	Scic	+ 5' 37"
8	Pierfranco Vianelli (ITA)	Dreher	+ 6' 27"
9	Antoine Houbrechts (BEL)	Salvarani	+ 6' 40"
10	Silvano Schiavon (ITA)	Dreher	+ 7' 04"

== Stage 18 ==
8 June 1971 — Lienz to Falcade, 195 km (121 mi)

Stage 18 result

Rank	Rider	Team	Time
1	Felice Gimondi (ITA)	Salvarani	6h 11' 21"
2	Herman Van Springel (BEL)	Molteni	s.t.
3	Gösta Pettersson (SWE)	Ferretti	s.t.
4	Francisco Galdós (ESP)	Kas–Kaskol	s.t.
5	Luis Zubero (ESP)	Kas–Kaskol	+ 14"
6	Silvano Schiavon (ITA)	Dreher	+ 17"
7	Ugo Colombo (ITA)	Filotex	+ 35"
8	Vicente López Carril (ESP)	Kas–Kaskol	s.t.
9	Giovanni Cavalcanti (ITA)	Filotex	s.t.
10	Enrico Maggioni (ITA)	Cosatto	+ 1' 10"

General classification after Stage 18

Rank	Rider	Team	Time
1	Gösta Pettersson (SWE)	Ferretti	87h 07' 07"
2	Ugo Colombo (ITA)	Filotex	+ 1' 34"
3	Herman Van Springel (BEL)	Molteni	+ 2' 01"
4	Francisco Galdós (ESP)	Kas–Kaskol	+ 3' 29"
5	Silvano Schiavon (ITA)	Dreher	+ 5' 19"
6	Pierfranco Vianelli (ITA)	Dreher	+ 5' 55"
7	Antoine Houbrechts (BEL)	Salvarani	+ 6' 03"
8	Felice Gimondi (ITA)	Salvarani	+ 7' 26"
9	Claudio Michelotto (ITA)	Scic	+ 7' 39"
10	Enrico Paolini (ITA)	Scic	+ 9' 05"

== Stage 19 ==
9 June 1971 — Falcade to Ponte di Legno, 182 km (113 mi)

Stage 19 result

Rank	Rider	Team	Time
1	Lino Farisato (ITA)	Ferretti	5h 10' 54"
2	Marinus Wagtmans (NED)	Molteni	+ 13"
3	Felice Gimondi (ITA)	Salvarani	+ 3' 39"
4	Herman Van Springel (BEL)	Molteni	+ 3' 40"
5	Ugo Colombo (ITA)	Filotex	s.t.
6	Gianni Motta (ITA)	Salvarani	s.t.
7	Enrico Maggioni (ITA)	Cosatto	+ 3' 44"
8	Luis Zubero (ESP)	Kas–Kaskol	+ 3' 47"
9	Francisco Galdós (ESP)	Kas–Kaskol	+ 3' 49"
10	Davide Boifava (ITA)	Scic	+ 3' 51"

General classification after Stage 19

Rank	Rider	Team	Time
1	Gösta Pettersson (SWE)	Ferretti	92h 22' 00"
2	Ugo Colombo (ITA)	Filotex	+ 1' 15"
3	Herman Van Springel (BEL)	Molteni	+ 1' 42"
4	Francisco Galdós (ESP)	Kas–Kaskol	+ 3' 19"
5	Silvano Schiavon (ITA)	Dreher	+ 5' 41"
6	Pierfranco Vianelli (ITA)	Dreher	+ 5' 55"
7	Felice Gimondi (ITA)	Salvarani	+ 7' 06"
8	Antoine Houbrechts (BEL)	Salvarani	+ 7' 51"
9	Wladimiro Panizza (ITA)	Cosatto	+ 11' 33"
10	Enrico Paolini (ITA)	Scic	+ 12' 39"

== Stage 20a ==
10 June 1971 — Ponte di Legno to Lainate, 185 km (115 mi)

Stage 20a result

Rank	Rider	Team	Time
1	Giacinto Santambrogio (ITA)	Molteni	4h 35' 19"
2	Wilmo Francioni (ITA)	Ferretti	s.t.
3	Guerrino Tosello (ITA)	Molteni	s.t.
4	Emilio Casalini (ITA)	Salvarani	+ 2"
5	Wladimiro Panizza (ITA)	Cosatto	s.t.
6	Attilio Benfatto (ITA)	Scic	s.t.
7	Attilio Rota (ITA)	Dreher	s.t.
8	Selvino Poloni (ITA)	Cosatto	+ 5"
9	Marino Basso (ITA)	Molteni	+ 24"
10	Patrick Sercu (BEL)	Dreher	s.t.

General classification after Stage 20a

Rank	Rider	Team	Time
1	Gösta Pettersson (SWE)	Ferretti	

== Stage 20b ==
10 June 1971 — Lainate to Milan, 20 km (12 mi) (ITT)

Stage 20b result

Rank	Rider	Team	Time
1	Ole Ritter (DEN)	Dreher	25' 41"
2	Gösta Pettersson (SWE)	Ferretti	+ 39"
3	Roger Swerts (BEL)	Molteni	+ 42"
4	Davide Boifava (ITA)	Scic	+ 44"
5	Pietro Guerra (ITA)	Salvarani	+ 50"
6	Herman Van Springel (BEL)	Molteni	+ 1' 01"
7	Felice Gimondi (ITA)	Salvarani	+ 1' 03"
8	Roberto Sorlini (ITA)	Cosatto	+ 1' 18"
9	Pierfranco Vianelli (ITA)	Dreher	+ 1' 25"
10	Giacinto Santambrogio (ITA)	Molteni	+ 1' 33"

General classification after Stage 20b

Rank	Rider	Team	Time
1	Gösta Pettersson (SWE)	Ferretti	97h 24' 03"
2	Herman Van Springel (BEL)	Molteni	+ 2' 04"
3	Ugo Colombo (ITA)	Filotex	+ 2' 35"
4	Francisco Galdós (ESP)	Kas–Kaskol	+ 4' 27"
5	Pierfranco Vianelli (ITA)	Dreher	+ 6' 41"
6	Silvano Schiavon (ITA)	Dreher	+ 7' 27"
7	Felice Gimondi (ITA)	Salvarani	+ 7' 30"
8	Antoine Houbrechts (BEL)	Salvarani	+ 9' 39"
9	Wladimiro Panizza (ITA)	Cosatto	+ 13' 13"
10	Giovanni Cavalcanti (ITA)	Filotex	+ 14' 22"
