= 1972 Giro d'Italia, Stage 12a to Stage 20 =

Cycling race stages

The 1972 Giro d'Italia was the 55th edition of the Giro d'Italia, one of cycling's Grand Tours. The Giro began in Venice on 21 May, and Stage 12a occurred on 2 June with a stage from Forte dei Marmi. The race finished in Milan on 11 June.

== Stage 12a ==
2 June 1972 — Forte dei Marmi, 20 km (12 mi) (ITT)

Stage 12a result

Rank	Rider	Team	Time
1	Eddy Merckx (BEL)	Molteni	25' 04"
=2	Felice Gimondi (ITA)	Salvarani	+ 11"
=2	Roger Swerts (BEL)	Molteni	s.t.
4	Roger de Vlaeminck (BEL)	Dreher	+ 15"
5	Ole Ritter (DEN)	Dreher	+ 22"
6	Mauro Simonetti (ITA)	Ferretti	+ 31"
7	Gösta Pettersson (SWE)	Ferretti	+ 35"
8	José Antonio González (ESP)	Kas–Kaskol	+ 40"
9	Tomas Pettersson (SWE)	Ferretti	+ 45"
10	José Pesarrodona (ESP)	Kas–Kaskol	+ 54"

== Stage 12b ==
2 June 1972 — Forte dei Marmi, 20 km (12 mi) (ITT)

Stage 12b result

Rank	Rider	Team	Time
1	Roger Swerts (BEL)	Molteni	24' 39"
2	Eddy Merckx (BEL)	Molteni	+ 11"
3	Felice Gimondi (ITA)	Salvarani	+ 50"
4	Gösta Pettersson (SWE)	Ferretti	+ 58"
5	José Antonio González (ESP)	Kas–Kaskol	+ 1' 03"
6	Ole Ritter (DEN)	Dreher	s.t.
7	Roger de Vlaeminck (BEL)	Dreher	+ 1' 13"
8	Francisco Galdós (ESP)	Kas–Kaskol	+ 1' 22"
9	Miguel María Lasa (ESP)	Kas–Kaskol	+ 1' 25"
10	Mauro Simonetti (ITA)	Ferretti	+ 1' 28"

General classification after Stage 12b

Rank	Rider	Team	Time
1	Eddy Merckx (BEL)	Molteni	58h 24' 08"
2	Gösta Pettersson (SWE)	Ferretti	+ 1' 32"
3	José Manuel Fuente (ESP)	Kas–Kaskol	+ 3' 59"
4	Miguel María Lasa (ESP)	Kas–Kaskol	+ 5' 41"
5	Felice Gimondi (ITA)	Salvarani	+ 6' 26"
6	Francisco Galdós (ESP)	Kas–Kaskol	+ 6' 37"
7	Roger de Vlaeminck (BEL)	Dreher	+ 6' 46"
8	Gianni Motta (ITA)	Ferretti	+ 6' 47"
9	Vicente López Carril (ESP)	Kas–Kaskol	+ 7' 30"
10	Italo Zilioli (ITA)	Salvarani	+ 8' 02"

== Stage 13 ==
3 June 1972 — Forte dei Marmi to Savona, 200 km (120 mi)

Stage 13 result

Rank	Rider	Team	Time
1	Wilmo Francioni (ITA)	Ferretti	5h 30' 46"
2	Roger de Vlaeminck (BEL)	Dreher	+ 6"
3	Miguel María Lasa (ESP)	Kas–Kaskol	s.t.
4	Felice Gimondi (ITA)	Salvarani	s.t.
5	Erich Spahn (SUI)	G.B.C.–Sony	s.t.
6	Roger Swerts (BEL)	Molteni	s.t.
7	Kurt Rub (SUI)	Zonca	s.t.
8	Gianni Motta (ITA)	Ferretti	s.t.
9	Attilio Benfatto (ITA)	Scic	s.t.
10	Ole Ritter (DEN)	Dreher	s.t.

General classification after Stage 13

Rank	Rider	Team	Time
1	Eddy Merckx (BEL)	Molteni	63h 55' 00"
2	Gösta Pettersson (SWE)	Ferretti	+ 1' 32"
3	José Manuel Fuente (ESP)	Kas–Kaskol	+ 3' 59"
4	Miguel María Lasa (ESP)	Kas–Kaskol	+ 5' 42"
5	Felice Gimondi (ITA)	Salvarani	+ 6' 26"
6	Francisco Galdós (ESP)	Kas–Kaskol	+ 6' 37"
7	Roger de Vlaeminck (BEL)	Dreher	+ 6' 46"
8	Gianni Motta (ITA)	Ferretti	+ 6' 47"
9	Vicente López Carril (ESP)	Kas–Kaskol	+ 7' 50"
10	Italo Zilioli (ITA)	Salvarani	+ 8' 02"

== Stage 14 ==
4 June 1972 — Savona to Monte Jafferau, 256 km (159 mi)

Stage 14 result

Rank	Rider	Team	Time
1	Eddy Merckx (BEL)	Molteni	8h 08' 07"
2	Wladimiro Panizza (ITA)	Zonca	+ 26"
3	José Manuel Fuente (ESP)	Kas–Kaskol	+ 47"
4	Vicente López Carril (ESP)	Kas–Kaskol	+ 49"
5	Josef Fuchs (SUI)	Filotex	+ 1' 17"
6	Felice Gimondi (ITA)	Salvarani	+ 1' 29"
7	Ole Ritter (DEN)	Dreher	+ 1' 38"
8	Italo Zilioli (ITA)	Salvarani	+ 1' 39"
9	Silvano Schiavon (ITA)	G.B.C.–Sony	+ 1' 44"
10	Gösta Pettersson (SWE)	Ferretti	+ 1' 51"

General classification after Stage 14

Rank	Rider	Team	Time
1	Eddy Merckx (BEL)	Molteni	72h 03' 07"
2	Gösta Pettersson (SWE)	Ferretti	+ 3' 23"
3	José Manuel Fuente (ESP)	Kas–Kaskol	+ 4' 46"
4	Felice Gimondi (ITA)	Salvarani	+ 7' 55"
5	Miguel María Lasa (ESP)	Kas–Kaskol	+ 8' 26"
6	Vicente López Carril (ESP)	Kas–Kaskol	+ 8' 39"
7	Roger de Vlaeminck (BEL)	Dreher	+ 9' 05"
8	Gianni Motta (ITA)	Ferretti	+ 9' 32"
9	Italo Zilioli (ITA)	Salvarani	+ 9' 41"
10	Francisco Galdós (ESP)	Kas–Kaskol	+ 10' 00"

== Rest day ==
5 June 1972

== Stage 15 ==
6 June 1972 — Parabiago to Parabiago, 168 km (104 mi)

Stage 15 result

Rank	Rider	Team	Time
1	Roger de Vlaeminck (BEL)	Dreher	3h 53' 57"
2	Michele Dancelli (ITA)	Scic	s.t.
3	Arnaldo Caverzasi (ITA)	Filotex	s.t.
4	Kurt Rub (SUI)	Zonca	s.t.
5	Attilio Benfatto (ITA)	Scic	s.t.
6	Wilmo Francioni (ITA)	Ferretti	s.t.
7	Guerrino Tosello (ITA)	Molteni	s.t.
8	Jozef Spruyt (BEL)	Salvarani	s.t.
9	Roger Swerts (BEL)	Molteni	s.t.
10	Vittorio Cumino (ITA)	Filotex	s.t.

General classification after Stage 15

Rank	Rider	Team	Time
1	Eddy Merckx (BEL)	Molteni	75h 57' 04"
2	Gösta Pettersson (SWE)	Ferretti	+ 3' 23"
3	José Manuel Fuente (ESP)	Kas–Kaskol	+ 4' 46"
4	Felice Gimondi (ITA)	Salvarani	+ 7' 55"
5	Vicente López Carril (ESP)	Kas–Kaskol	+ 8' 39"
6	Miguel María Lasa (ESP)	Kas–Kaskol	+ 8' 56"
7	Roger de Vlaeminck (BEL)	Dreher	+ 9' 05"
8	Francisco Galdós (ESP)	Kas–Kaskol	+ 10' 00"
9	Wladimiro Panizza (ITA)	Zonca	+ 10' 19"
10	Silvano Schiavon (ITA)	G.B.C.–Sony	+ 11' 06"

== Stage 16 ==
7 June 1972 — Parabiago to Livigno, 256 km (159 mi)

Stage 16 result

Rank	Rider	Team	Time
1	Eddy Merckx (BEL)	Molteni	7h 43' 59"
2	Francisco Galdós (ESP)	Kas–Kaskol	+ 18"
3	Marcello Bergamo (ITA)	Filotex	+ 1' 00"
4	Wladimiro Panizza (ITA)	Zonca	s.t.
5	José Manuel Fuente (ESP)	Kas–Kaskol	+ 1' 03"
6	Miguel María Lasa (ESP)	Kas–Kaskol	+ 1' 22"
7	Vicente López Carril (ESP)	Kas–Kaskol	s.t.
8	Ole Ritter (DEN)	Dreher	+ 2' 04"
9	Santiago Lazcano (ESP)	Kas–Kaskol	s.t.
10	José Pesarrodona (ESP)	Kas–Kaskol	s.t.

General classification after Stage 16

Rank	Rider	Team	Time
1	Eddy Merckx (BEL)	Molteni	83h 40' 23"
2	José Manuel Fuente (ESP)	Kas–Kaskol	+ 5' 49"
3	Gösta Pettersson (SWE)	Ferretti	+ 5' 52"
4	Vicente López Carril (ESP)	Kas–Kaskol	+ 10' 01"
5	Francisco Galdós (ESP)	Kas–Kaskol	+ 10' 18"
6	Miguel María Lasa (ESP)	Kas–Kaskol	s.t.
7	Felice Gimondi (ITA)	Salvarani	+ 10' 24"
8	Wladimiro Panizza (ITA)	Zonca	+ 11' 19"
9	Roger de Vlaeminck (BEL)	Dreher	+ 11' 34"
10	Marcello Bergamo (ITA)	Filotex	+ 13' 18"

== Stage 17 ==
8 June 1972 — Livigno to Passo dello Stelvio, 88 km (55 mi)

Stage 17 result

Rank	Rider	Team	Time
1	José Manuel Fuente (ESP)	Kas–Kaskol	3h 03' 14"
2	Francisco Galdós (ESP)	Kas–Kaskol	+ 32"
3	Eddy Merckx (BEL)	Molteni	+ 2' 05"
4	Wladimiro Panizza (ITA)	Zonca	+ 2' 05"
5	Vicente López Carril (ESP)	Kas–Kaskol	s.t.
6	Giuseppe Perletto (ITA)	Zonca	+ 2' 14"
7	Santiago Lazcano (ESP)	Kas–Kaskol	+ 2' 19"
8	André Poppe (BEL)	Van Cauter–Magniflex–de Gribaldy	+ 2' 41"
9	Josef Fuchs (SUI)	Filotex	+ 2' 50"
10	Antoine Houbrechts (BEL)	Salvarani	+ 3' 26"

General classification after Stage 17

Rank	Rider	Team	Time
1	Eddy Merckx (BEL)	Molteni	86h 46' 22"
2	José Manuel Fuente (ESP)	Kas–Kaskol	+ 3' 44"
3	Francisco Galdós (ESP)	Kas–Kaskol	+ 8' 51"
4	Vicente López Carril (ESP)	Kas–Kaskol	+ 10' 02"
5	Wladimiro Panizza (ITA)	Zonca	+ 11' 20"
6	Gösta Pettersson (SWE)	Ferretti	+ 11' 57"
7	Miguel María Lasa (ESP)	Kas–Kaskol	+ 12' 44"
8	Roger de Vlaeminck (BEL)	Dreher	+ 13' 07"
9	Felice Gimondi (ITA)	Salvarani	+ 13' 17"
10	Santiago Lazcano (ESP)	Kas–Kaskol	+ 14' 31"

== Stage 18 ==
9 June 1972 — Sulden to Asiago, 223 km (139 mi)

Stage 18 result

Rank	Rider	Team	Time
1	Roger de Vlaeminck (BEL)	Dreher	6h 08' 47"
2	Miguel María Lasa (ESP)	Kas–Kaskol	s.t.
3	Roger Swerts (BEL)	Molteni	s.t.
4	Marcello Bergamo (ITA)	Filotex	+ 2"
5	Felice Gimondi (ITA)	Salvarani	s.t.
6	Kurt Rub (SUI)	Zonca	s.t.
7	Albert Van Vlierberghe (BEL)	Ferretti	s.t.
8	Georges Pintens (BEL)	Van Cauter–Magniflex–de Gribaldy	s.t.
9	Victor Van Schil (BEL)	Molteni	s.t.
10	Donato Giuliani (ITA)	Filotex	s.t.

General classification after Stage 18

Rank	Rider	Team	Time
1	Eddy Merckx (BEL)	Molteni	92h 55' 11"
2	José Manuel Fuente (ESP)	Kas–Kaskol	+ 3' 44"
3	Francisco Galdós (ESP)	Kas–Kaskol	+ 8' 51"
4	Vicente López Carril (ESP)	Kas–Kaskol	+ 10' 02"
5	Wladimiro Panizza (ITA)	Zonca	+ 11' 20"
6	Gösta Pettersson (SWE)	Ferretti	+ 11' 57"
7	Miguel María Lasa (ESP)	Kas–Kaskol	+ 12' 42"
8	Roger de Vlaeminck (BEL)	Dreher	+ 13' 05"
9	Felice Gimondi (ITA)	Salvarani	+ 13' 17"
10	Santiago Lazcano (ESP)	Kas–Kaskol	+ 14' 31"

== Stage 19a ==
10 June 1972 — Asiago to Arco, 163 km (101 mi)

Stage 19a result

Rank	Rider	Team	Time
1	Roger de Vlaeminck (BEL)	Dreher	5h 13' 51"
2	Michele Dancelli (ITA)	Scic	s.t.
3	Miguel María Lasa (ESP)	Kas–Kaskol	s.t.
4	Arnaldo Caverzasi (ITA)	Filotex	s.t.
5	Ludo Van Staeyen (BEL)	Van Cauter–Magniflex–de Gribaldy	s.t.
6	Felice Gimondi (ITA)	Salvarani	s.t.
7	Kurt Rub (SUI)	Zonca	s.t.
8	Vittorio Urbani (ITA)	Van Cauter–Magniflex–de Gribaldy	s.t.
9	Vittorio Cumino (ITA)	Filotex	s.t.
10	Celestino Vercelli (ITA)	Scic	s.t.

General classification after Stage 19a

Rank	Rider	Team	Time
1	Eddy Merckx (BEL)	Molteni	

== Stage 19b ==
10 June 1972 — Arco to Arco, 18 km (11 mi) (ITT)

Stage 19b result

Rank	Rider	Team	Time
1	Eddy Merckx (BEL)	Molteni	22' 42"
2	Roger Swerts (BEL)	Molteni	+ 33"
3	Roger de Vlaeminck (BEL)	Dreher	+ 47"
4	Felice Gimondi (ITA)	Salvarani	+ 48"
5	Ole Ritter (DEN)	Dreher	+ 49"
6	Gösta Pettersson (SWE)	Ferretti	+ 1' 00"
7	Wladimiro Panizza (ITA)	Zonca	+ 1' 13"
8	Vicente López Carril (ESP)	Kas–Kaskol	+ 1' 15"
9	José Manuel Fuente (ESP)	Kas–Kaskol	+ 1' 19"
10	Antoine Houbrechts (BEL)	Salvarani	s.t.

General classification after Stage 19b

Rank	Rider	Team	Time
1	Eddy Merckx (BEL)	Molteni	98h 31' 44"
2	José Manuel Fuente (ESP)	Kas–Kaskol	+ 5' 30"
3	Francisco Galdós (ESP)	Kas–Kaskol	+ 10' 39"
4	Vicente López Carril (ESP)	Kas–Kaskol	+ 11' 17"
5	Wladimiro Panizza (ITA)	Zonca	+ 13' 00"
6	Gösta Pettersson (SWE)	Ferretti	+ 13' 09"
7	Roger de Vlaeminck (BEL)	Dreher	+ 13' 52"
8	Felice Gimondi (ITA)	Salvarani	+ 14' 05"
9	Miguel María Lasa (ESP)	Kas–Kaskol	+ 14' 19"
10	Santiago Lazcano (ESP)	Kas–Kaskol	+ 17' 42"

== Stage 20 ==
11 June 1972 — Arco to Milan, 185 km (115 mi)

Stage 20 result

Rank	Rider	Team	Time
1	Enrico Paolini (ITA)	Scic	4h 31' 36"
2	Jos Huysmans (BEL)	Molteni	s.t.
3	Ole Ritter (DEN)	Dreher	s.t.
4	Mauro Simonetti (ITA)	Ferretti	s.t.
5	Antoine Houbrechts (BEL)	Salvarani	s.t.
6	Ugo Colombo (ITA)	Filotex	s.t.
7	Giancarlo Bellini (ITA)	Molteni	s.t.
8	Roger de Vlaeminck (BEL)	Dreher	+ 44"
9	Michele Dancelli (ITA)	Scic	s.t.
10	Eddy Merckx (BEL)	Molteni	s.t.

General classification after Stage 20

Rank	Rider	Team	Time
1	Eddy Merckx (BEL)	Molteni	103h 04' 04"
2	José Manuel Fuente (ESP)	Kas–Kaskol	+ 5' 30"
3	Francisco Galdós (ESP)	Kas–Kaskol	+ 10' 39"
4	Vicente López Carril (ESP)	Kas–Kaskol	+ 11' 17"
5	Wladimiro Panizza (ITA)	Zonca	+ 13' 00"
6	Gösta Pettersson (SWE)	Ferretti	+ 13' 09"
7	Roger de Vlaeminck (BEL)	Dreher	+ 13' 52"
8	Felice Gimondi (ITA)	Salvarani	+ 14' 05"
9	Miguel María Lasa (ESP)	Kas–Kaskol	+ 14' 19"
10	Santiago Lazcano (ESP)	Kas–Kaskol	+ 17' 42"
