= 1972 Giro d'Italia, Stage 1 to Stage 11 =

Cycling race stages

The 1972 Giro d'Italia was the 55th edition of the Giro d'Italia, one of cycling's Grand Tours. The Giro began in Venice on 21 May, and Stage 11 occurred on 1 June with a stage to Forte dei Marmi. The race finished in Milan on 11 June.

== Stage 1 ==
21 May 1972 — Venice to Ravenna, 196 km (122 mi)

Stage 1 result and general classification after Stage 1

Rank	Rider	Team	Time
1	Marino Basso (ITA)	Salvarani	4h 59' 00"
2	Franco Bitossi (ITA)	Filotex	s.t.
3	Miguel María Lasa (ESP)	Kas–Kaskol	s.t.
4	Michele Dancelli (ITA)	Scic	s.t.
5	Dino Zandegù (ITA)	G.B.C.–Sony	s.t.
6	Patrick Sercu (BEL)	Dreher	s.t.
7	Kurt Rub (SUI)	Zonca	s.t.
8	Virginio Levati (ITA)	Zonca	s.t.
9	Ludo Van Staeyen (BEL)	Van Cauter–Magniflex–de Gribaldy	s.t.
10	Georges Pintens (BEL)	Van Cauter–Magniflex–de Gribaldy	s.t.

== Stage 2 ==
22 May 1972 — Ravenna to Fermo, 212 km (132 mi)

Stage 2 result

Rank	Rider	Team	Time
1	Gianni Motta (ITA)	Ferretti	5h 26' 37"
2	Franco Bitossi (ITA)	Filotex	s.t.
3	Marino Basso (ITA)	Salvarani	s.t.
4	Eddy Merckx (BEL)	Molteni	s.t.
5	Roger de Vlaeminck (BEL)	Dreher	s.t.
6	Albert Van Vlierberghe (BEL)	Ferretti	s.t.
7	Silvano Ravagli (ITA)	Van Cauter–Magniflex–de Gribaldy	s.t.
8	Felice Gimondi (ITA)	Salvarani	s.t.
9	Davide Boifava (ITA)	Zonca	s.t.
10	Ole Ritter (DEN)	Dreher	s.t.

General classification after Stage 2

Rank	Rider	Team	Time
1	Marino Basso (ITA)	Salvarani	10h 25' 37"
2	Franco Bitossi (ITA)	Filotex	s.t.
3	Miguel María Lasa (ESP)	Kas–Kaskol	s.t.
4	Michele Dancelli (ITA)	Scic	s.t.
5	Dino Zandegù (ITA)	G.B.C.–Sony	s.t.
6	Kurt Rub (SUI)	Zonca	s.t.
7	Ludo Van Staeyen (BEL)	Van Cauter–Magniflex–de Gribaldy	s.t.
8	Georges Pintens (BEL)	Van Cauter–Magniflex–de Gribaldy	s.t.
9	Albert Van Vlierberghe (BEL)	Ferretti	s.t.
10	Eddy Merckx (BEL)	Molteni	s.t.

== Stage 3 ==
23 May 1972 — Porto San Giorgio to Francavilla al Mare, 205 km (127 mi)

Stage 3 result

Rank	Rider	Team	Time
1	Ugo Colombo (ITA)	Filotex	5h 48' 20"
2	Eddy Merckx (BEL)	Molteni	+ 15"
3	Gianni Motta (ITA)	Ferretti	s.t.
4	Michele Dancelli (ITA)	Scic	s.t.
5	Franco Bitossi (ITA)	Filotex	s.t.
6	Roger de Vlaeminck (BEL)	Dreher	s.t.
7	Miguel María Lasa (ESP)	Kas–Kaskol	s.t.
8	Davide Boifava (ITA)	Zonca	s.t.
9	Felice Gimondi (ITA)	Salvarani	s.t.
10	Georges Pintens (BEL)	Van Cauter–Magniflex–de Gribaldy	s.t.

General classification after Stage 3

Rank	Rider	Team	Time
1	Ugo Colombo (ITA)	Filotex	16h 13' 57"
2	Franco Bitossi (ITA)	Filotex	+ 15"
3	Gianni Motta (ITA)	Ferretti	s.t.
4	Eddy Merckx (BEL)	Molteni	s.t.
5	Albert Van Vlierberghe (BEL)	Ferretti	s.t.
6	Miguel María Lasa (ESP)	Kas–Kaskol	s.t.
7	Georges Pintens (BEL)	Van Cauter–Magniflex–de Gribaldy	s.t.
8	Felice Gimondi (ITA)	Salvarani	s.t.
9	Davide Boifava (ITA)	Zonca	s.t.
10	Michele Dancelli (ITA)	Scic	s.t.

== Stage 4a ==
24 May 1972 — Francavilla al Mare to Blockhaus, 48 km (30 mi)

Stage 4a result

Rank	Rider	Team	Time
1	José Manuel Fuente (ESP)	Kas–Kaskol	1h 42' 18"
2	Miguel María Lasa (ESP)	Kas–Kaskol	+ 1' 35"
3	Gianni Motta (ITA)	Ferretti	+ 2' 36"
4	Marcello Bergamo (ITA)	Filotex	s.t.
5	Eddy Merckx (BEL)	Molteni	s.t.
6	Vicente López Carril (ESP)	Kas–Kaskol	+ 2' 42"
7	Ole Ritter (DEN)	Dreher	+ 2' 44"
8	Gösta Pettersson (SWE)	Ferretti	+ 2' 46"
9	Santiago Lazcano (ESP)	Kas–Kaskol	s.t.
10	Francisco Galdós (ESP)	Kas–Kaskol	+ 2' 53"

General classification after Stage 4a

Rank	Rider	Team	Time
1	José Manuel Fuente (ESP)	Kas–Kaskol	

== Stage 4b ==
24 May 1972 — Blockhaus to Foggia, 210 km (130 mi)

Stage 4b result

Rank	Rider	Team	Time
1	Wilmo Francioni (ITA)	Ferretti	5h 31' 01"
2	Enrico Paolini (ITA)	Scic	s.t.
3	Giacinto Santambrogio (ITA)	Salvarani	s.t.
4	Willy De Geest (BEL)	Van Cauter–Magniflex–de Gribaldy	s.t.
5	Roger Swerts (BEL)	Molteni	s.t.
6	Antoine Houbrechts (BEL)	Salvarani	s.t.
7	Enrico Maggioni (ITA)	Dreher	s.t.
8	Frans Mintjens (BEL)	Molteni	s.t.
9	Mario Anni (ITA)	Ferretti	s.t.
10	Attilio Benfatto (ITA)	Scic	+ 25"

General classification after Stage 4b

Rank	Rider	Team	Time
1	José Manuel Fuente (ESP)	Kas–Kaskol	23h 27' 58"
2	Miguel María Lasa (ESP)	Kas–Kaskol	+ 1' 35"
3	Gianni Motta (ITA)	Ferretti	+ 2' 36"
4	Eddy Merckx (BEL)	Molteni	s.t.
5	Santiago Lazcano (ESP)	Kas–Kaskol	+ 2' 46"
6	Gösta Pettersson (SWE)	Ferretti	s.t.
7	Francisco Galdós (ESP)	Kas–Kaskol	+ 2' 53"
8	Silvano Schiavon (ITA)	G.B.C.–Sony	+ 2' 57"
9	Marcello Bergamo (ITA)	Filotex	+ 3' 02"
10	Italo Zilioli (ITA)	Salvarani	+ 3' 07"

== Stage 5 ==
25 May 1972 — Foggia to Montesano sulla Marcellana, 238 km (148 mi)

Stage 5 result

Rank	Rider	Team	Time
1	Fabrizio Fabbri (ITA)	Van Cauter–Magniflex–de Gribaldy	6h 53' 20"
2	Giancarlo Bellini (ITA)	Molteni	+ 1"
3	Franco Bitossi (ITA)	Filotex	+ 11"
4	Eddy Merckx (BEL)	Molteni	+ 13"
5	Roger de Vlaeminck (BEL)	Dreher	s.t.
6	Wladimiro Panizza (ITA)	Zonca	s.t.
7	Gianni Motta (ITA)	Ferretti	s.t.
8	Italo Zilioli (ITA)	Salvarani	s.t.
9	Ole Ritter (DEN)	Dreher	s.t.
10	Felice Gimondi (ITA)	Salvarani	s.t.

General classification after Stage 5

Rank	Rider	Team	Time
1	José Manuel Fuente (ESP)	Kas–Kaskol	30h 21' 31"
2	Miguel María Lasa (ESP)	Kas–Kaskol	+ 1' 35"
3	Gianni Motta (ITA)	Ferretti	+ 2' 36"
4	Eddy Merckx (BEL)	Molteni	s.t.
5	Santiago Lazcano (ESP)	Kas–Kaskol	+ 2' 46"
6	Gösta Pettersson (SWE)	Ferretti	s.t.
7	Francisco Galdós (ESP)	Kas–Kaskol	+ 2' 53"
8	Silvano Schiavon (ITA)	G.B.C.–Sony	+ 2' 57"
9	Marcello Bergamo (ITA)	Filotex	+ 3' 02"
10	Italo Zilioli (ITA)	Salvarani	+ 3' 03"

== Stage 6 ==
26 May 1972 — Montesano sulla Marcellana to Cosenza, 190 km (120 mi)

Stage 6 result

Rank	Rider	Team	Time
1	Roger de Vlaeminck (BEL)	Dreher	5h 50' 24"
2	Enrico Paolini (ITA)	Scic	+ 2"
3	Erich Spahn (SUI)	G.B.C.–Sony	s.t.
4	Arnaldo Caverzasi (ITA)	Filotex	+ 4"
5	Ludo Van Staeyen (BEL)	Van Cauter–Magniflex–de Gribaldy	s.t.
6	Gianni Motta (ITA)	Ferretti	+ 8"
7	Roger Swerts (BEL)	Molteni	s.t.
8	Roberto Poggiali (ITA)	Salvarani	s.t.
9	Franco Bitossi (ITA)	Filotex	s.t.
10	Giuseppe Perletto (ITA)	Zonca	s.t.

General classification after Stage 6

Rank	Rider	Team	Time
1	José Manuel Fuente (ESP)	Kas–Kaskol	36h 12' 03"
2	Miguel María Lasa (ESP)	Kas–Kaskol	+ 1' 35"
3	Gianni Motta (ITA)	Ferretti	+ 2' 36"
4	Eddy Merckx (BEL)	Molteni	s.t.
5	Santiago Lazcano (ESP)	Kas–Kaskol	+ 2' 46"
6	Gösta Pettersson (SWE)	Ferretti	s.t.
7	Francisco Galdós (ESP)	Kas–Kaskol	+ 2' 53"
8	Silvano Schiavon (ITA)	G.B.C.–Sony	+ 2' 57"
9	Marcello Bergamo (ITA)	Filotex	+ 3' 02"
10	Italo Zilioli (ITA)	Salvarani	+ 3' 03"

== Stage 7 ==
27 May 1972 — Cosenza to Catanzaro, 151 km (94 mi)

Stage 7 result

Rank	Rider	Team	Time
1	Gösta Pettersson (SWE)	Ferretti	4h 07' 28"
2	Eddy Merckx (BEL)	Molteni	s.t.
3	Miguel María Lasa (ESP)	Kas–Kaskol	+ 4' 13"
4	Franco Bitossi (ITA)	Filotex	s.t.
5	Jozef Spruyt (BEL)	Salvarani	s.t.
6	Gianni Motta (ITA)	Ferretti	s.t.
7	Felice Gimondi (ITA)	Salvarani	s.t.
8	Giancarlo Polidori (ITA)	Scic	s.t.
9	Italo Zilioli (ITA)	Salvarani	s.t.
10	Vicente López Carril (ESP)	Kas–Kaskol	s.t.

General classification after Stage 7

Rank	Rider	Team	Time
1	Eddy Merckx (BEL)	Molteni	40h 22' 07"
2	Gösta Pettersson (SWE)	Ferretti	+ 10"
3	José Manuel Fuente (ESP)	Kas–Kaskol	+ 1' 37"
4	Miguel María Lasa (ESP)	Kas–Kaskol	+ 3' 12"
5	Gianni Motta (ITA)	Ferretti	+ 4' 13"
6	Francisco Galdós (ESP)	Kas–Kaskol	+ 4' 30"
7	Italo Zilioli (ITA)	Salvarani	+ 4' 40"
8	Vicente López Carril (ESP)	Kas–Kaskol	+ 4' 45"
9	Silvano Schiavon (ITA)	G.B.C.–Sony	+ 5' 03"
10	Santiago Lazcano (ESP)	Kas–Kaskol	+ 5' 04"

== Stage 8 ==
28 May 1972 — Catanzaro to Reggio Calabria, 160 km (99 mi)

Stage 8 result

Rank	Rider	Team	Time
1	Attilio Benfatto (ITA)	Scic	4h 25' 06"
2	Felice Gimondi (ITA)	Salvarani	+ 2"
3	Erich Spahn (SUI)	G.B.C.–Sony	s.t.
4	Ottavio Crepaldi (ITA)	Ferretti	s.t.
5	Guerrino Tosello (ITA)	Molteni	s.t.
6	Albert Van Vlierberghe (BEL)	Ferretti	s.t.
7	Miguel María Lasa (ESP)	Kas–Kaskol	s.t.
8	Michele Dancelli (ITA)	Scic	s.t.
9	Franco Bitossi (ITA)	Filotex	s.t.
10	Arnaldo Caverzasi (ITA)	Filotex	s.t.

General classification after Stage 8

Rank	Rider	Team	Time
1	Eddy Merckx (BEL)	Molteni	44h 47' 15"
2	Gösta Pettersson (SWE)	Ferretti	+ 10"
3	José Manuel Fuente (ESP)	Kas–Kaskol	+ 1' 37"
4	Miguel María Lasa (ESP)	Kas–Kaskol	+ 3' 12"
5	Gianni Motta (ITA)	Ferretti	+ 4' 13"
6	Francisco Galdós (ESP)	Kas–Kaskol	+ 4' 30"
7	Italo Zilioli (ITA)	Salvarani	+ 4' 40"
8	Vicente López Carril (ESP)	Kas–Kaskol	+ 4' 45"
9	Silvano Schiavon (ITA)	G.B.C.–Sony	+ 5' 03"
10	Santiago Lazcano (ESP)	Kas–Kaskol	+ 5' 04"

== Stage 9 ==
29 May 1972 — Messina to Messina, 110 km (68 mi)

Stage 9 result

Rank	Rider	Team	Time
1	Albert Van Vlierberghe (BEL)	Ferretti	3h 09' 09"
2	Vittorio Cumino (ITA)	Filotex	s.t.
3	Jurg Schneider (SUI)	G.B.C.–Sony	s.t.
4	Giancarlo Polidori (ITA)	Scic	s.t.
5	Miguel María Lasa (ESP)	Kas–Kaskol	s.t.
6	Roger de Vlaeminck (BEL)	Dreher	s.t.
7	Michele Dancelli (ITA)	Scic	s.t.
8	Eddy Merckx (BEL)	Molteni	s.t.
9	Franco Bitossi (ITA)	Filotex	s.t.
10	Ole Ritter (DEN)	Dreher	s.t.

General classification after Stage 9

Rank	Rider	Team	Time
1	Eddy Merckx (BEL)	Molteni	47h 56' 24"
2	Gösta Pettersson (SWE)	Ferretti	+ 10"
3	José Manuel Fuente (ESP)	Kas–Kaskol	+ 1' 37"
4	Miguel María Lasa (ESP)	Kas–Kaskol	+ 3' 12"
5	Gianni Motta (ITA)	Ferretti	+ 4' 13"
6	Francisco Galdós (ESP)	Kas–Kaskol	+ 4' 30"
7	Italo Zilioli (ITA)	Salvarani	+ 4' 40"
8	Vicente López Carril (ESP)	Kas–Kaskol	+ 4' 45"
9	Silvano Schiavon (ITA)	G.B.C.–Sony	+ 5' 03"
10	Santiago Lazcano (ESP)	Kas–Kaskol	+ 5' 04"

== Rest day ==
30 May 1972

== Stage 10 ==
31 May 1972 — Rome to Monte Argentario, 166 km (103 mi)

Stage 10 result

Rank	Rider	Team	Time
1	Italo Zilioli (ITA)	Salvarani	3h 58' 31"
2	Roger de Vlaeminck (BEL)	Dreher	+ 15"
3	Gianni Motta (ITA)	Ferretti	s.t.
4	Franco Bitossi (ITA)	Filotex	s.t.
5	Michele Dancelli (ITA)	Scic	s.t.
6	Roberto Poggiali (ITA)	Salvarani	s.t.
7	Eddy Merckx (BEL)	Molteni	s.t.
8	Louis Pfenninger (SUI)	Zonca	s.t.
9	Felice Gimondi (ITA)	Salvarani	s.t.
10	Willy De Geest (BEL)	Van Cauter–Magniflex–de Gribaldy	s.t.

General classification after Stage 10

Rank	Rider	Team	Time
1	Eddy Merckx (BEL)	Molteni	51h 55' 10"
2	Gösta Pettersson (SWE)	Ferretti	+ 10"
3	José Manuel Fuente (ESP)	Kas–Kaskol	+ 1' 37"
4	Miguel María Lasa (ESP)	Kas–Kaskol	+ 3' 12"
5	Gianni Motta (ITA)	Ferretti	+ 4' 13"
6	Italo Zilioli (ITA)	Salvarani	+ 4' 28"
7	Francisco Galdós (ESP)	Kas–Kaskol	+ 4' 30"
8	Vicente López Carril (ESP)	Kas–Kaskol	+ 4' 45"
9	Silvano Schiavon (ITA)	G.B.C.–Sony	+ 5' 03"
10	Santiago Lazcano (ESP)	Kas–Kaskol	+ 5' 04"

== Stage 11 ==
1 June 1972 — Monte Argentario to Forte dei Marmi, 242 km (150 mi)

Stage 11 result

Rank	Rider	Team	Time
1	Miguel María Lasa (ESP)	Kas–Kaskol	5h 39' 04"
2	Roger de Vlaeminck (BEL)	Dreher	s.t.
3	Franco Bitossi (ITA)	Filotex	s.t.
4	Willy De Geest (BEL)	Van Cauter–Magniflex–de Gribaldy	s.t.
5	Erich Spahn (SUI)	G.B.C.–Sony	s.t.
6	Gianni Motta (ITA)	Ferretti	s.t.
7	Albert Van Vlierberghe (BEL)	Ferretti	s.t.
8	Michele Dancelli (ITA)	Scic	s.t.
9	Ole Ritter (DEN)	Dreher	s.t.
10	Felice Gimondi (ITA)	Salvarani	s.t.

General classification after Stage 11

Rank	Rider	Team	Time
1	Eddy Merckx (BEL)	Molteni	57h 34' 14"
2	Gösta Pettersson (SWE)	Ferretti	+ 10"
3	José Manuel Fuente (ESP)	Kas–Kaskol	+ 1' 37"
4	Miguel María Lasa (ESP)	Kas–Kaskol	+ 3' 12"
5	Gianni Motta (ITA)	Ferretti	+ 4' 13"
6	Italo Zilioli (ITA)	Salvarani	+ 4' 25"
7	Francisco Galdós (ESP)	Kas–Kaskol	+ 4' 30"
8	Vicente López Carril (ESP)	Kas–Kaskol	+ 4' 45"
9	Silvano Schiavon (ITA)	G.B.C.–Sony	+ 5' 03"
10	Santiago Lazcano (ESP)	Kas–Kaskol	+ 5' 04"
