= 1970 Giro d'Italia, Stage 11 to Stage 20 =

Cycling race stages

The 1970 Giro d'Italia was the 53rd edition of the Giro d'Italia, one of cycling's Grand Tours. The Giro began in San Pellegrino Terme on 18 May, and Stage 11 occurred on 29 May with a stage from Rivisondoli. The race finished in Bolzano on 7 June.

== Stage 11 ==
29 May 1970 — Rivisondoli to Francavilla al Mare, 180 km (110 mi)

Stage 11 result

Rank	Rider	Team	Time
1	Michele Dancelli (ITA)	Molteni	5h 13' 49"
2	Vito Taccone (ITA)	Cosatto	+ 1' 18"
3	Marino Basso (ITA)	Molteni	+ 1' 21"
4	Miguel María Lasa (ESP)	La Casera	s.t.
5	Martin Van Den Bossche (BEL)	Molteni	s.t.
6	Franco Bitossi (ITA)	Filotex	s.t.
7	Eddy Merckx (BEL)	Faemino–Faema	s.t.
8	Aldo Moser (ITA)	G.B.C.	s.t.
9	Ole Ritter (DEN)	Germanvox	s.t.
10	Italo Zilioli (ITA)	Faemino–Faema	s.t.

General classification after Stage 11

Rank	Rider	Team	Time
1	Eddy Merckx (BEL)	Faemino–Faema	45h 44' 22"
2	Ole Ritter (DEN)	Germanvox	+ 2' 41"
3	Felice Gimondi (ITA)	Salvarani	+ 2' 52"
4	Martin Van Den Bossche (BEL)	Molteni	+ 4' 59"
5	Michele Dancelli (ITA)	Molteni	+ 5' 01"
6	Italo Zilioli (ITA)	Faemino–Faema	+ 5' 08"
7	Vittorio Adorni (ITA)	Scic	+ 5' 19"
8	Franco Bitossi (ITA)	Filotex	+ 5' 53"
9	Gösta Pettersson (SWE)	Ferretti	+ 6' 33"
10	Pierfranco Vianelli (ITA)	Molteni	+ 7' 37"

== Stage 12 ==
30 May 1970 — Francavilla al Mare to Loreto, 175 km (109 mi)

Stage 12 result

Rank	Rider	Team	Time
1	Miguel María Lasa (ESP)	La Casera	4h 06' 57"
2	Jos Huysmans (BEL)	Faemino–Faema	+ 8"
3	Walter Godefroot (BEL)	Salvarani	+ 16"
4	Eddy Merckx (BEL)	Faemino–Faema	s.t.
5	Martin Van Den Bossche (BEL)	Molteni	s.t.
6	Italo Zilioli (ITA)	Faemino–Faema	s.t.
7	Dino Zandegù (ITA)	Salvarani	s.t.
8	Felice Gimondi (ITA)	Salvarani	s.t.
9	Ole Ritter (DEN)	Germanvox	s.t.
10	Julien Van Lint (BEL)	Germanvox	+ 22"

General classification after Stage 12

Rank	Rider	Team	Time
1	Eddy Merckx (BEL)	Faemino–Faema	48h 51' 35"
2	Ole Ritter (DEN)	Germanvox	+ 2' 41"
3	Felice Gimondi (ITA)	Salvarani	+ 2' 52"
4	Martin Van Den Bossche (BEL)	Molteni	+ 4' 59"
5	Italo Zilioli (ITA)	Faemino–Faema	+ 5' 08"
6	Vittorio Adorni (ITA)	Scic	+ 5' 36"
7	Michele Dancelli (ITA)	Molteni	+ 5' 44"
8	Gösta Pettersson (SWE)	Ferretti	+ 6' 42"
9	Franco Bitossi (ITA)	Filotex	+ 6' 49"
10	Miguel María Lasa (ESP)	La Casera	+ 7' 36"

== Stage 13 ==
31 May 1970 — Loreto to Faenza, 188 km (117 mi)

Stage 13 result

Rank	Rider	Team	Time
1	Michele Dancelli (ITA)	Molteni	4h 49' 40"
2	Marino Basso (ITA)	Molteni	s.t.
3	Franco Bitossi (ITA)	Filotex	s.t.
4	Dino Zandegù (ITA)	Salvarani	s.t.
5	Guido Reybrouck (BEL)	Germanvox	s.t.
6	Luigi Sgarbozza (ITA)	Dreher	s.t.
7	Jean Ronsmans (BEL)	Magniflex	s.t.
8	Sture Pettersson (SWE)	Ferretti	s.t.
9	Vito Taccone (ITA)	Cosatto	s.t.
10	Luciano Soave (ITA)	Dreher	s.t.

General classification after Stage 13

Rank	Rider	Team	Time
1	Eddy Merckx (BEL)	Faemino–Faema	54h 41' 15"
2	Ole Ritter (DEN)	Germanvox	+ 2' 41"
3	Felice Gimondi (ITA)	Salvarani	+ 2' 52"
4	Martin Van Den Bossche (BEL)	Molteni	+ 4' 59"
5	Italo Zilioli (ITA)	Faemino–Faema	+ 5' 08"
6	Vittorio Adorni (ITA)	Scic	+ 5' 36"
7	Michele Dancelli (ITA)	Molteni	+ 5' 44"
8	Gösta Pettersson (SWE)	Ferretti	+ 6' 42"
9	Franco Bitossi (ITA)	Filotex	+ 6' 49"
10	Miguel María Lasa (ESP)	La Casera	+ 7' 36"

== Stage 14 ==
1 June 1970 — Faenza to Casciana Terme, 218 km (135 mi)

Stage 14 result

Rank	Rider	Team	Time
1	Michele Dancelli (ITA)	Molteni	5h 44' 58"
2	Martin Van Den Bossche (BEL)	Molteni	+ 3"
3	Walter Godefroot (BEL)	Salvarani	s.t.
4	Felice Gimondi (ITA)	Salvarani	s.t.
5	Eddy Merckx (BEL)	Faemino–Faema	s.t.
6	Albert Van Vlierberghe (BEL)	Ferretti	s.t.
7	Miguel María Lasa (ESP)	La Casera	s.t.
8	Ole Ritter (DEN)	Germanvox	s.t.
9	Roberto Ballini (ITA)	Dreher	s.t.
10	Marcello Bergamo (ITA)	Filotex	s.t.

General classification after Stage 14

Rank	Rider	Team	Time
1	Eddy Merckx (BEL)	Faemino–Faema	60h 26' 16"
2	Ole Ritter (DEN)	Germanvox	+ 2' 41"
3	Felice Gimondi (ITA)	Salvarani	+ 2' 52"
4	Martin Van Den Bossche (BEL)	Molteni	+ 4' 59"
5	Italo Zilioli (ITA)	Faemino–Faema	+ 5' 08"
6	Michele Dancelli (ITA)	Molteni	+ 5' 41"
7	Vittorio Adorni (ITA)	Scic	+ 5' 43"
8	Gösta Pettersson (SWE)	Ferretti	+ 6' 49"
9	Miguel María Lasa (ESP)	La Casera	+ 7' 36"
10	Pierfranco Vianelli (ITA)	Molteni	+ 8' 40"

== Stage 15 ==
2 June 1970 — Casciana Terme to Mirandola, 215 km (134 mi)

Stage 15 result

Rank	Rider	Team	Time
1	Marino Basso (ITA)	Molteni	6h 08' 58"
2	Guido Reybrouck (BEL)	Germanvox	s.t.
3	Giuseppe Grassi (ITA)	Filotex	s.t.
4	Patrick Sercu (BEL)	Dreher	s.t.
5	Georges Vandenberghe (BEL)	Faemino–Faema	s.t.
6	Walter Godefroot (BEL)	Salvarani	s.t.
7	Jean Ronsmans (BEL)	Magniflex	s.t.
8	Adriano Durante (ITA)	Scic	s.t.
9	Dino Zandegù (ITA)	Salvarani	s.t.
10	Sigfrido Fontanelli (ITA)	Magniflex	s.t.

General classification after Stage 15

Rank	Rider	Team	Time
1	Eddy Merckx (BEL)	Faemino–Faema	66h 35' 14"
2	Ole Ritter (DEN)	Germanvox	+ 2' 41"
3	Felice Gimondi (ITA)	Salvarani	+ 2' 52"
4	Martin Van Den Bossche (BEL)	Molteni	+ 4' 59"
5	Italo Zilioli (ITA)	Faemino–Faema	+ 5' 08"
6	Michele Dancelli (ITA)	Molteni	+ 5' 41"
7	Vittorio Adorni (ITA)	Scic	+ 5' 43"
8	Gösta Pettersson (SWE)	Ferretti	+ 6' 49"
9	Miguel María Lasa (ESP)	La Casera	+ 7' 36"
10	Pierfranco Vianelli (ITA)	Molteni	+ 8' 40"

== Stage 16 ==
3 June 1970 — Mirandola to Lido di Jesolo, 195 km (121 mi)

Stage 16 result

Rank	Rider	Team	Time
1	Dino Zandegù (ITA)	Salvarani	4h 52' 16"
2	Guido Reybrouck (BEL)	Germanvox	s.t.
3	Marino Basso (ITA)	Molteni	s.t.
4	Walter Godefroot (BEL)	Salvarani	s.t.
5	Patrick Sercu (BEL)	Dreher	s.t.
6	Luigi Sgarbozza (ITA)	Dreher	s.t.
7	Georges Vandenberghe (BEL)	Faemino–Faema	s.t.
8	Rudi Altig (FRG)	G.B.C.	s.t.
9	Jean Ronsmans (BEL)	Magniflex	s.t.
10	Michele Dancelli (ITA)	Molteni	s.t.

General classification after Stage 16

Rank	Rider	Team	Time
1	Eddy Merckx (BEL)	Faemino–Faema	71h 27' 30"
2	Ole Ritter (DEN)	Germanvox	+ 2' 41"
3	Felice Gimondi (ITA)	Salvarani	+ 2' 52"
4	Martin Van Den Bossche (BEL)	Molteni	+ 4' 59"
5	Italo Zilioli (ITA)	Faemino–Faema	+ 5' 08"
6	Vittorio Adorni (ITA)	Scic	+ 5' 43"
7	Michele Dancelli (ITA)	Molteni	+ 5' 43"
8	Gösta Pettersson (SWE)	Ferretti	+ 6' 49"
9	Miguel María Lasa (ESP)	La Casera	+ 7' 36"
10	Pierfranco Vianelli (ITA)	Molteni	+ 8' 40"

== Stage 17 ==
4 June 1970 — Lido di Jesolo to Arta Terme, 165 km (103 mi)

Stage 17 result

Rank	Rider	Team	Time
1	Franco Bitossi (ITA)	Filotex	4h 36' 57"
2	Martin Van Den Bossche (BEL)	Molteni	+ 4"
3	Marcello Bergamo (ITA)	Filotex	s.t.
4	Walter Godefroot (BEL)	Salvarani	s.t.
5	Guido Reybrouck (BEL)	Germanvox	s.t.
6	Albert Van Vlierberghe (BEL)	Ferretti	s.t.
7	Michele Dancelli (ITA)	Molteni	s.t.
8	Luigi Sgarbozza (ITA)	Dreher	s.t.
9	Roger Swerts (BEL)	Faemino–Faema	s.t.
10	Lino Farisato (ITA)	Faemino–Faema	s.t.

General classification after Stage 17

Rank	Rider	Team	Time
1	Eddy Merckx (BEL)	Faemino–Faema	76h 04' 31"
2	Ole Ritter (DEN)	Germanvox	+ 2' 41"
3	Felice Gimondi (ITA)	Salvarani	+ 2' 52"
4	Martin Van Den Bossche (BEL)	Molteni	+ 4' 59"
5	Italo Zilioli (ITA)	Faemino–Faema	+ 5' 08"
6	Vittorio Adorni (ITA)	Scic	+ 5' 43"
7	Michele Dancelli (ITA)	Molteni	+ 5' 46"
8	Gösta Pettersson (SWE)	Ferretti	+ 6' 49"
9	Miguel María Lasa (ESP)	La Casera	+ 7' 36"
10	Pierfranco Vianelli (ITA)	Molteni	+ 8' 40"

== Stage 18 ==
5 June 1970 — Arta Terme to Marmolada, 180 km (110 mi)

Stage 18 result

Rank	Rider	Team	Time
1	Michele Dancelli (ITA)	Molteni	5h 32' 14"
2	Franco Bitossi (ITA)	Filotex	+ 13"
3	Martin Van Den Bossche (BEL)	Molteni	+ 15"
4	Eddy Merckx (BEL)	Faemino–Faema	s.t.
5	Felice Gimondi (ITA)	Salvarani	+ 37"
6	Italo Zilioli (ITA)	Faemino–Faema	+ 40"
7	Gösta Pettersson (SWE)	Ferretti	+ 1' 06"
8	Ugo Colombo (ITA)	Filotex	+ 7' 59"
9	Ole Ritter (DEN)	Germanvox	+ 8' 03"
10	Silvano Schiavon (ITA)	Salvarani	s.t.

General classification after Stage 18

Rank	Rider	Team	Time
1	Eddy Merckx (BEL)	Faemino–Faema	81h 37' 00"
2	Felice Gimondi (ITA)	Salvarani	+ 3' 14"
3	Martin Van Den Bossche (BEL)	Molteni	+ 4' 59"
4	Michele Dancelli (ITA)	Molteni	+ 5' 31"
5	Italo Zilioli (ITA)	Faemino–Faema	+ 5' 33"
6	Gösta Pettersson (SWE)	Ferretti	+ 7' 40"
7	Ole Ritter (DEN)	Germanvox	+ 10' 29"
8	Franco Bitossi (ITA)	Filotex	+ 13' 10"
9	Vittorio Adorni (ITA)	Scic	+ 17' 38"
10	Miguel María Lasa (ESP)	La Casera	+ 17' 49"

== Stage 19 ==
6 June 1970 — Rocca Pietore to Dobbiaco, 120 km (75 mi)

Stage 19 result

Rank	Rider	Team	Time
1	Franco Bitossi (ITA)	Filotex	3h 46' 38"
2	Giancarlo Polidori (ITA)	Scic	s.t.
3	Martin Van Den Bossche (BEL)	Molteni	s.t.
4	Eddy Merckx (BEL)	Faemino–Faema	s.t.
5	Felice Gimondi (ITA)	Salvarani	s.t.
6	Miguel María Lasa (ESP)	La Casera	+ 1' 36"
7	Michele Dancelli (ITA)	Molteni	s.t.
8	Gösta Pettersson (SWE)	Ferretti	+ 1' 40"
9	Giovanni Cavalcanti (ITA)	Salvarani	+ 1' 43"
10	Roberto Poggiali (ITA)	Salvarani	s.t.

General classification after Stage 19

Rank	Rider	Team	Time
1	Eddy Merckx (BEL)	Faemino–Faema	85h 23' 38"
2	Felice Gimondi (ITA)	Salvarani	+ 3' 14"
3	Martin Van Den Bossche (BEL)	Molteni	+ 3' 59"
4	Michele Dancelli (ITA)	Molteni	+ 7' 07"
5	Italo Zilioli (ITA)	Faemino–Faema	+ 8' 14"
6	Gösta Pettersson (SWE)	Ferretti	+ 9' 20"
7	Franco Bitossi (ITA)	Filotex	+ 13' 10"
8	Miguel María Lasa (ESP)	La Casera	+ 19' 25"
9	Ole Ritter (DEN)	Germanvox	+ 21' 17"
10	Vittorio Adorni (ITA)	Scic	+ 21' 29"

== Stage 20 ==
7 June 1970 — Dobbiaco to Bolzano, 155 km (96 mi)

Stage 20 result

Rank	Rider	Team	Time
1	Luciano Armani (ITA)	Scic	4h 42' 17"
2	Michele Dancelli (ITA)	Molteni	+ 2' 52"
3	Franco Bitossi (ITA)	Filotex	s.t.
4	Giancarlo Polidori (ITA)	Scic	s.t.
5	Eddy Merckx (BEL)	Faemino–Faema	s.t.
6	Luigi Sgarbozza (ITA)	Dreher	s.t.
7	Guerrino Tosello (ITA)	Molteni	s.t.
8	Luciano Soave (ITA)	Dreher	s.t.
9	Angelo Bassini (ITA)	Germanvox	s.t.
10	Attilio Benfatto (ITA)	Scic	s.t.

General classification after Stage 20

Rank	Rider	Team	Time
1	Eddy Merckx (BEL)	Faemino–Faema	90h 08' 47"
2	Felice Gimondi (ITA)	Salvarani	+ 3' 14"
3	Martin Van Den Bossche (BEL)	Molteni	+ 4' 59"
4	Michele Dancelli (ITA)	Molteni	+ 7' 07"
5	Italo Zilioli (ITA)	Faemino–Faema	+ 8' 14"
6	Gösta Pettersson (SWE)	Ferretti	+ 9' 20"
7	Franco Bitossi (ITA)	Filotex	+ 13' 10"
8	Miguel María Lasa (ESP)	La Casera	+ 19' 25"
9	Ole Ritter (DEN)	Germanvox	+ 21' 17"
10	Vittorio Adorni (ITA)	Scic	+ 21' 29"
