= 1971 Giro d'Italia =

Race details
- Dates: 20 May - 10 June 1971
- Stages: 20 + Prologue
- Distance: 3,567 km (2,216 mi)
- Winning time: 97h 24' 03"

Results
Jersey awarded to the overall winner	Winner	Gösta Pettersson (SWE)	(Ferretti)
	Second	Herman Van Springel (BEL)	(Molteni)
	Third	Ugo Colombo (ITA)	(Filotex)
Jersey awarded to the points classification winner	Points	Marino Basso (ITA)	(Molteni)
	Mountains	José Manuel Fuente (ESP)	(KAS)
	Team	Molteni	

The 1971 Giro d'Italia was the 55th edition of the Giro, one of cycling's Grand Tours. The 3,567-kilometre (2,216 mi) race consisted of 20 stages and an opening prologue, starting in Lecce on 20 May and finishing at the Vigorelli velodrome in Milan on 10 June. There were three time trial stages and a single rest day. Gösta Pettersson of the Ferretti team won the overall general classification, becoming the first Swedish rider to win a Grand Tour. Herman Van Springel (Molteni) placed second, 2 min and 32 s in arrears, and Ugo Colombo (Filotex) was third, just three seconds slower than Van Springel.

== Teams ==
Tour de France organizer Félix Lévitan and the Mars-Flandria were in disagreements over the team's participation in the coming Tour de France and there was speculation that the team would instead race the Giro d'Italia. The team chose to wait for Lévitan's decision regarding their entry, which came following the Giro's start, and therefore did not participate in the Giro. Ultimately, Lévitian requested the team to pay extra money, on top of the 25,000 franc entry fee, to participate in the Tour. A total of 10 teams were invited to participate in the 1971 Giro d'Italia. Each team sent a squad of ten riders, so the Giro began with a peloton of 100 cyclists.

Twenty-seven of the starters participated in the Giro d'Italia for the first time. The majority of riders were Italian (72), while 28 riders were foreign. Of the non-Italians, Belgians had the most with twelve riders, 10 Spaniards which comprised the whole KAS team, 3 Swedes, 2 Swiss, and one French rider. Only two of the ten teams entering the race were not based in Italy: KAS (Spain) and Magniflex (Belgium). The average age of riders was 26.69 years, ranging from 21–year–old Mario Lanzafame (Cosatto) to 37–year–old Aldo Moser (G.B.C.). The team with the youngest average rider age was Cosatto (24), while the oldest was Salvarani (28).

Giorgio Favaro was the last rider to arrive for the race because his Molteni teammate Martin Van Den Bossche was removed shortly before the race's start due to the discovery of an abscess that was operated on in a Vicenza hospital. Out of the riders that started this edition of the Giro d'Italia, a total of 75 riders made it to the finish in Milan.

The teams that took part in the race were:

- Cosatto
- Dreher
- Ferretti
- Filotex
- G.B.C.
- KAS
- Magniflex
- Molteni
- Salvarani
- Scic

== Pre-race favorites ==
On 15 January, it was announced that Eddy Merckx the winner of the previous year's race and the 1968 edition would not participate in the race for the first time in four years. Instead, he would focus solely on preparing for the upcoming Tour de France, which he hoped to win for the third consecutive year. An El Mundo Deportivo writer felt Merckx's absence opened the race for other riders to win. The starting peloton featured three previous winners: Franco Balmamion (1962 & 1963) riding for Scic, Salvarani's Felice Gimondi (1965 & 1967), and Gianni Motta (1966), also of Salvarani. Gimondi had finished in the top five of the general classification in each Giro since 1965. Motta entered the Giro after having won the Tour de Romandie. Motta and Gimondi were named favorites. Salvarani announced they would be racing the Tour de France in July; however, Het Vrije Volk writer Peter Ouwerkerk questioned whether the team - which had thirteen riders total - had enough stamina for these large three-week races.

Ouwerkerk felt Salvarani's biggest challenger was to be the Molteni team, even without Merckx, and he specifically felt Herman Van Springel was capable of winning the race. He referenced Gimondi's previous season where he exceeded expectations as a primary reason for his support. Van Den Bossche was also thought to be a challenger for the Salvarani riders before his aforementioned withdrawal before the race. Molteni's riders Marino Basso and Romano Tumellero were thought to give the team enough support in the absence of Merckx. Italo Zilioli, Franco Bitossi, Gösta Pettersson, Patrick Sercu, and Michele Dancelli were other riders that were thought to be contenders for the overall victory.

== Route and stages ==
The race route was unveiled by race director Vincenzo Torriani on 24 February 1971. The start of the race was announced to be in Lecce after the officials of the city paid 20 million lira to the organization to earn the honor. The race contained 20 stages, one of which was a split stage, and one opening prologue. There were ten stages that included categorized climbs that had points to count towards the mountains classification, including the twelfth stage which was a climbing individual time trial to the Serniga di Salò. Six of the stages featured summit finishes. Together, the amount of climbing for the categorized climbs included in the race totaled to be 26.5 km (16 mi). There were three total time trials, two individual and one team leg. The final stage of the race ended in Milan at the Vigorelli velodrome. The race was televised in an hourly program each day and also covered over the radio.

The race route traveled all the way down to the boot of the Italian countryside. The opening prologue from Lecce to Apulia time trial stage covering 62.2 km (39 mi), was broken into ten equal 6.22 km (4 mi) segments, with one rider from each team of ten contesting one part. The team with the lowest total time was declared winner and all of the team's riders go to wear the race leader's maglia rosa the following day. The times did not count towards the general classification for the race. When writing about this stage's format 44 years later, rider Renato Laghi commented "Torriani was forever having strange ideas."

The race entered two countries aside from Italy, Yugoslavia and Austria. This was the first time the Giro entered Austria, as the race traveled through the country to finish on the Großglockner. The race's entry into the Dolomites from June 7 to June 9 was expected to be the highlight. Former Italian cyclist Cino Cinelli stated that he had tried to climb the mountain several times and that the race's cars would have a hard time climbing the mountain.

There was some concern over the quality and condition of the some roads used early in the race, particularly during the second mass-start stage. Five-time champion Alfredo Binda said "Only a climber can win it and it will remain uncertain until Ponte di Legno." El Mundo writer Bosch praised race organizer Torriani for experimenting with new routes and felt that this route was "the best."

Stage characteristics and results
Stage	Date	Course	Distance	Type	Winner
P	20 May	Lecce to Brindisi	62.2 km (39 mi)	Team time trial	Salvarani (Note: The results of the opening prologue did not count towards the general classification, but were instead used to determine who would wear the race leader's maglia rosa the following day. Salvarani won the prologue and each member of their team wore a maglia rosa during the race's first stage.)
1	21 May	Brindisi to Bari	175 km (109 mi)	Plain stage	Marino Basso (ITA)
2	22 May	Bari to Potenza	260 km (162 mi)	Stage with mountain(s)	Enrico Paolini (ITA)
3	23 May	Potenza to Benevento	177 km (110 mi)	Plain stage	Ercole Gualazzini (ITA)
4	24 May	Benevento to Pescasseroli	203 km (126 mi)	Stage with mountain(s)	Guerrino Tosello (ITA)
5	25 May	Pescasseroli to Gran Sasso d'Italia	198 km (123 mi)	Stage with mountain(s)	Vicente López Carril (ESP)
6	26 May	L'Aquila to Orvieto	163 km (101 mi)	Plain stage	Domingo Perurena (ESP)
7	27 May	Orvieto to San Vincenzo	220 km (137 mi)	Plain stage	Felice Gimondi (ITA)
8	28 May	San Vincenzo to Casciana Terme	203 km (126 mi)	Stage with mountain(s)	Romeno Tumellero (ITA)
9	29 May	Casciana Terme to Forte dei Marmi	141 km (88 mi)	Plain stage	Marino Basso (ITA)
10	30 May	Forte dei Marmi to Pian del Falco di Sestola	123 km (76 mi)	Stage with mountain(s)	José Manuel Fuente (ESP)
11	31 May	Sestola to Mantua	199 km (124 mi)	Plain stage	Marino Basso (ITA)
	1 June	Rest day			
12	2 June	Desenzano del Garda to Serniga di Salò	28 km (17 mi)	Individual time trial	Davide Boifava (ITA)
13	3 June	Salò to Sottomarina di Chioggia	218 km (135 mi)	Stage with mountain(s)	Patrick Sercu (BEL)
14	4 June	Chioggia to Bibione	170 km (106 mi)	Plain stage	Patrick Sercu (BEL)
15	5 June	Bibione to Ljubljana (Yugoslavia)	201 km (125 mi)	Plain stage	Franco Bitossi (ITA)
16	6 June	Ljubljana (Yugoslavia) to Tarvisio	100 km (62 mi)	Plain stage	Dino Zandegù (ITA)
17	7 June	Tarvisio to Großglockner (Austria)	206 km (128 mi)	Stage with mountain(s)	Pierfranco Vianelli (ITA)
18	8 June	Lienz (Austria) to Falcade	195 km (121 mi)	Stage with mountain(s)	Felice Gimondi (ITA)
19	9 June	Falcade to Ponte di Legno	182 km (113 mi)	Stage with mountain(s)	Lino Farisato (ITA)
20a	10 June	Ponte di Legno to Lainate	185 km (115 mi)	Plain stage	Giacinto Santambrogio (ITA)
20b	10 June	Lainate to Milan	20 km (12 mi)	Individual time trial	Ole Ritter (DEN)
	Total		3,567 km (2,216 mi)		

== Race overview ==
The race started at 1:45 PM local time in front of the Piazza Sant'Oronzo, it was estimated that 200,000 people watched along the course. Salvarani won the team time trial event by three seconds over Molteni and one of their leaders, Gimondi, registered the fastest time over the 6.2 km (4 mi) at 8' 26 s. The favorites entering the day, Ferretti, finished in fourth, 52 s slower than Salvarani. The group remained together initially before Molteni's Luigi Castelletti attacked off the front of the peloton and gained a few minutes advantage before KAS, G.B.C., and Ferretti riders raised the tempo and caught Castelletti. As rain started to hit the course, Marinus Wagtmans (Molteni) won the second traguardi tricolori sprint of the leg, ahead of Attilio Rota (Dreher). The two then opened up a gap between the peloton reaching 55", but Rota refused to help with the pace and the two were with several kilometers remaining. After the day had under 30 km (19 mi) left there was a crash involving roughly 50 riders. The riders remounted and another attacked ensued by a group of riders; however, it was caught as the peloton geared up for a bunch sprint. The sprint to the line was closely contested by Franco Bitossi (Filotex) and Marino Basso (Molteni) and both celebrated as if to have won the stage, but a photo finish revealed Basso to be the victor and he assumed the lead of the general classification and points classification. The second stage of the race was the longest of the race at 260 km (162 mi).

During the seventeenth stage, that finished on the Großglockner, an Alpine pass. Race leader Claudio Michelotto held on to the back of a team car to finish the climb and was given a one-minute penalty. Following the stage, Pettersson took the race lead from Michelotto. Pettersson became the first rider born north of the Rhine to win the Giro d'Italia. In addition, he became the first Swedish rider to win a Grand Tour.

=== Doping ===
Doping controls were conducted following each stage finish. If a rider tested positive, the punishment was a ten-minute penalty and their stage results were voided. It was announced on 26 May that Gianni Motta had tested positive for ephedrine. In response to the news, Motta stated that he had used his grandmother's herbs to help with his fatigue. Lucillo Lievore also tested positive.

== Classification leadership ==
Two different leader's jerseys were worn during the 1971 Giro d'Italia. The leader of the general classification – calculated by adding the stage finish times of each rider – wore a pink jersey. This classification is the most important of the race, and its winner is considered as the winner of the Giro.

For the points classification, which awarded a cyclamen jersey to its leader, cyclists were given points for finishing a stage in the top 15.

A third classification was the mountains classification. In this ranking, points were won by reaching the summit of a climb ahead of other cyclists. No jersey was worn by its leader. The climbs were ranked in first and second categories, the former awarded 50, 30, and 20 points while the latter awarded 30, 20, and 10 points. In this ranking, points were won by reaching the summit of a climb ahead of other cyclists. In addition there was the Cima Coppi, the Grossglockner, which was the highest mountain crossed in this edition of the race, which gave 200, 100, 80, 70, and 50 points to the first five riders summit the climb. The first rider over the Grossglockner was Pierfranco Vianelli.

There was also one classification for the teams, based on points. Riders scored points for their team if they were amongst the first 15 to finish a stage, at intermediate sprints, and mountain tops, and for leading the general classification.

A minor classification was the intermediate sprints classification, called the traguardi tricolori. On intermediate sprints, the first rider received 30 points for this classification, and the second rider 10 points. No jersey was used to indicate the leader. There was no time bonus at these intermediate sprints, and no points for the points classification.

New in 1971 was the combination classification. Copied from the Tour de France, it was calculated by adding the positions in the four most important classifications (general, points, mountains and intermediate sprints).

Classification leadership by stage
Stage	Winner	General classification	Points classification	Mountains classification	Intermediate sprints classification	Team classification
P	Salvarani	Salvarani	not awarded	not awarded	not awarded	not awarded
1	Marino Basso	Marino Basso	Marino Basso	not awarded	multiple shared	Molteni
2	Enrico Paolini	Enrico Paolini	Gianni Motta	Michele Dancelli	multiple shared	Scic
3	Ercole Gualazzini	Enrico Paolini	Gianni Motta	Michele Dancelli	multiple shared	Scic
4	Guerrino Tosello	Enrico Paolini	Gianni Motta	Roberto Sorlini	multiple shared	Scic
5	Vicente López Carril	Ugo Colombo	Marino Basso	Vicente López Carril	multiple shared	Scic
6	Domingo Perurena	Ugo Colombo	Marino Basso	Vicente López Carril	multiple shared	Molteni
7	Felice Gimondi	Aldo Moser	Marino Basso	Vicente López Carril	multiple shared	Salvarani
8	Romano Tumellero	Claudio Michelotto	Marino Basso	Vicente López Carril	multiple shared	Molteni
9	Marino Basso	Claudio Michelotto	Marino Basso	José Manuel Fuente	multiple shared	Molteni
10	José Manuel Fuente	Claudio Michelotto	Marino Basso	José Manuel Fuente	multiple shared	Molteni
11	Marino Basso	Claudio Michelotto	Marino Basso	José Manuel Fuente	Wilmo Francioni	Molteni
12	Davide Boifava	Claudio Michelotto	Marino Basso	José Manuel Fuente	Wilmo Francioni	Molteni
13	Patrick Sercu	Claudio Michelotto	Marino Basso	José Manuel Fuente	Wout Wagtmans	Molteni
14	Patrick Sercu	Claudio Michelotto	Marino Basso	José Manuel Fuente	Wout Wagtmans	Molteni
15	Franco Bitossi	Claudio Michelotto	Marino Basso	José Manuel Fuente	Wout Wagtmans	Molteni
16	Dino Zandegù	Claudio Michelotto	Marino Basso	José Manuel Fuente	Wout Wagtmans	Molteni
17	Pierfranco Vianelli	Claudio Michelotto	Marino Basso	Pierfranco Vianelli	Wout Wagtmans	Molteni
18	Felice Gimondi	Gösta Pettersson	Marino Basso	José Manuel Fuente	Wout Wagtmans	Molteni
19	Lino Farisato	Gösta Pettersson	Marino Basso	José Manuel Fuente	Wout Wagtmans	Molteni
20a	Giacinto Santambrogio	Gösta Pettersson	Marino Basso	José Manuel Fuente	Wout Wagtmans	Molteni
20b	Ole Ritter	Gösta Pettersson	Marino Basso	José Manuel Fuente	Wout Wagtmans	Molteni
Final		Gösta Pettersson	Marino Basso	José Manuel Fuente	Wout Wagtmans	Molteni

== Final standings ==
Legend
Pink jersey	Denotes the winner of the General classification
Violet jersey	Denotes the winner of the Points classification

=== General classification ===
Final general classification (1–10)
Rank	Name	Team	Time
1	Gösta Pettersson (SWE)	Ferretti	97h 24' 04"
2	Herman Van Springel (BEL)	Molteni	+ 2' 32"
3	Ugo Colombo (ITA)	Filotex	+ 2' 35"
4	Francisco Galdós (ESP)	KAS	+ 4' 27"
5	Pierfranco Vianelli (ITA)	Dreher	+ 6' 41"
6	Silvano Schiavon (ITA)	Dreher	+ 7' 27"
7	Felice Gimondi (ITA)	Salvarani	+ 7' 30"
8	Antoine Hubrechts (BEL)	Salvarani	+ 9' 39"
9	Wladimiro Panizza (ITA)	Cosatto	+ 13' 13"
10	Giovanni Cavalcanti (ITA)	Filotex	+ 14' 22"

=== Mountains classification ===
Final mountains classification (1–10)
	Name	Team	Points
1	José Manuel Fuente (ESP)	KAS	360
2	Pierfranco Vianelli (ITA)	Dreher	270
3	Primo Mori (ITA)	Salvarani	190
4	Lino Farisato (ITA)	Ferretti	170
5	Vicente López-Carril (ESP)	KAS	140
6	Andrés Gandarias (ESP)	KAS	110
7	Giancarlo Polidori (ITA)	Scic	100
8	Selvino Poloni (ITA)	Cosatto	80
9	Felice Gimondi (ITA)	Salvarani	70
9	Guerrino Tosello (ITA)	Molteni	70

=== Points classification ===
Final points classification (1–10)
	Name	Team	Points
1	Marino Basso (ITA)	Molteni	181
2	Patrick Sercu (BEL)	Dreher	148
3	Felice Gimondi (ITA)	Salvarani	139
4	Ole Ritter (DEN)	Dreher	136
5	Albert Van Vlierberghe (BEL)	Ferretti	116
6	Franco Bitossi (ITA)	Filotex	96
7	Gösta Pettersson (SWE)	Ferretti	92
7	Dino Zandegù (ITA)	Salvarani	92
9	Gianni Motta (ITA)	Salvarani	85
10	Herman Van Springel (BEL)	Molteni	84

=== Traguardi tricolori classification ===
Final traguardi tricolori classification (1–9)
	Name	Team	Points
1	Marinus Wagtmans (NED)	Molteni	130
2	Wilmo Francioni (ITA)	Ferretti	60
3	Primo Mori (ITA)	Salvarani	50
4	Pietro Guerra (ITA)	Salvarani	40
4	Attilio Rota (ITA)	Dreher	40
4	Ole Ritter (DEN)	Dreher	40
4	André Poppe (FRA)	Magniflex	40
4	Roberto Sorlini (ITA)	Cosatto	40
9	Giacinto Santambrogio (ITA)	Molteni	30
9	Giancarlo Bellini (ITA)	Molteni	30
9	Piero Dallai (ITA)	Cosatto	30
9	Guerrino Tosello (ITA)	Molteni	30
9	Ugo Colombo (ITA)	Filotex	30
9	Andrés Gandarias (ESP)	KAS	30
9	Marino Basso (ITA)	Molteni	30
9	Selvino Poloni (ITA)	Cosatto	30
9	Lino Farisato (ITA)	Ferretti	30

=== Teams classification ===
Final team classification (1–10)
	Team	Points
1	Molteni	5956
2	Salvarani	4476
3	Scic	4162
4	Dreher	3795
5	Ferretti	3768
6	KAS	3150
7	Filotex	2192
8	G.B.C.	1689
9	Cosatto	1584
10	Magniflex	1128
