= 1970 Giro di Lombardia =

Race details
- Dates: 10 October 1970
- Stages: 1
- Distance: 266 km (165 mi)
- Winning time: 6h 57' 22"

Results
	Winner	Franco Bitossi (ITA)	(Filotex)
	Second	Felice Gimondi (ITA)	(Salvarani)
	Third	Gianni Motta (ITA)	(Salvarani)

The 1970 Giro di Lombardia was the 64th edition of the Giro di Lombardia cycle race and was held on 10 October 1970. The race started in Milan and finished in Como. The race was won by Franco Bitossi of the Filotex team.

== General classification ==
Final general classification

Rank	Rider	Team	Time
1	Franco Bitossi (ITA)	Filotex	6h 57' 22"
2	Felice Gimondi (ITA)	Salvarani	+ 0"
3	Gianni Motta (ITA)	Salvarani	+ 2' 17"
4	Eddy Merckx (BEL)	Faemino–Faema	+ 2' 17"
5	Herman Van Springel (BEL)	Dr. Mann–Grundig	+ 2' 17"
6	Ole Ritter (DEN)	Germanvox–Wega	+ 2' 17"
7	Luis Ocaña (ESP)	Bic	+ 2' 17"
8	Enrico Maggioni (ITA)	Ferretti	+ 2' 17"
9	Michele Dancelli (ITA)	Molteni	+ 5' 17"
10	Billy Bilsland (GBR)	Peugeot–BP–Michelin	+ 6' 42"
