= 1970 Tour de Suisse =

Race details
- Dates: 11–19 June 1970
- Stages: 9 + Prologue
- Distance: 1,629 km (1,012 mi)
- Winning time: 43h 53' 27"

Results
	Winner	Roberto Poggiali (ITA)	(Salvarani)
	Second	Louis Pfenninger (SUI)	(Zimba–GBC)
	Third	Primo Mori (ITA)	(Salvarani)
	Points	Franco Bitossi (ITA)	(Filotex)
	Mountains	Arie den Hartog (NED)	(Caballero–Laurens)
	Team	Salvarani	

The 1970 Tour de Suisse was the 34th edition of the Tour de Suisse cycle race and was held from 11 June to 19 June 1970. The race started in Murten and finished in Zürich. The race was won by Roberto Poggiali of the Salvarani team.

== General classification ==
Final general classification

Rank	Rider	Team	Time
1	Roberto Poggiali (ITA)	Salvarani	43h 53' 27"
2	Louis Pfenninger (SUI)	G.B.C.–Zimba	+ 1' 03"
3	Primo Mori (ITA)	Salvarani	+ 1' 14"
4	Arie den Hartog (NED)	Caballero–Laurens	+ 1' 16"
5	Ugo Colombo (ITA)	Filotex	+ 1' 56"
6	Kurt Rub (SUI)	G.B.C.–Zimba	+ 2' 37"
7	Franco Bitossi (ITA)	Filotex	+ 3' 53"
8	Felice Gimondi (ITA)	Salvarani	+ 4' 37"
9	Bernard Vifian (SUI)	Frimatic–de Gribaldy	+ 8' 14"
10	Hans Junkermann (FRG)	Batavus–Alcina–Continental	+ 9' 12"
