= 1971 Milan–San Remo =

Race details
- Dates: 19 March 1971
- Stages: 1
- Distance: 288 km (179 mi)
- Winning time: 7h 21' 20"

Results
	Winner	Eddy Merckx (BEL)	(Molteni)
	Second	Felice Gimondi (ITA)	(Salvarani)
	Third	Gösta Pettersson (SWE)	(Ferretti)

The 1971 Milan–San Remo was the 62nd edition of the Milan–San Remo cycle race and was held on 19 March 1971. The race started in Milan and finished in San Remo. The race was won by Eddy Merckx of the Molteni team.

After the ceremony, Merckx immediately left for Belgium to place the flowers received on the coffin of Jean-Pierre Monseré. The then UCI world champion perished a few days earlier during a preparation race for Milan-San Remo.

== General classification ==
Final general classification

Rank	Rider	Team	Time
1	Eddy Merckx (BEL)	Molteni	7h 21' 20"
2	Felice Gimondi (ITA)	Salvarani	+ 30"
3	Gösta Pettersson (SWE)	Ferretti	+ 30"
4	Roberto Ballini (ITA)	Ferretti	+ 30"
5	Joseph Bruyère (BEL)	Molteni	+ 38"
6	Jozef Spruyt (BEL)	Molteni	+ 45"
7	Gianni Motta (ITA)	Salvarani	+ 47"
8	Roger Rosiers (BEL)	Bic	+ 1' 22"
9	Albert Van Vlierberghe (BEL)	Ferretti	+ 1' 22"
10	Yves Hézard (FRA)	Sonolor–Lejeune	+ 2' 01"
