= 1972 Tour de Suisse =

Race details
- Dates: 15–23 June 1972
- Stages: 8 + Prologue
- Distance: 1,457 km (905.3 mi)
- Winning time: 41h 22' 43"

Results
	Winner	Louis Pfenninger (SUI)	(Rokado)
	Second	Roger Pingeon (FRA)	(Peugeot–BP–Michelin)
	Third	Michele Dancelli (ITA)	(Scic)
	Points	Michele Dancelli (ITA)	(Scic)
	Mountains	Silvano Schiavon (ITA)	(GBC–Sony)
	Team	GBC–Sony	

The 1972 Tour de Suisse was the 36th edition of the Tour de Suisse cycle race and was held from 15 June to 23 June 1972. The race started in Zürich and finished in Olten. The race was won by Louis Pfenninger of the Rokado team.

== General classification ==
Final general classification

Rank	Rider	Team	Time
1	Louis Pfenninger (SUI)	Rokado	41h 22' 43"
2	Roger Pingeon (FRA)	Peugeot–BP–Michelin	+ 21"
3	Michele Dancelli (ITA)	Scic	+ 1' 49"
4	Erich Spahn (SUI)	Möbel Märki–Bonanza	+ 1' 51"
5	Joaquim Agostinho (POR)	Van Cauter–Magniflex–de Gribaldy	+ 4' 26"
6	Silvano Schiavon (ITA)	GBC–Sony	+ 5' 04"
7	Derek Harrison (GBR)	Raleigh	+ 8' 28"
8	Fritz Wehrli (SUI)	Möbel Märki–Bonanza	+ 14' 08"
9	Mario Lanzafame (ITA)	GBC–Sony	+ 16' 07"
10	Wilfried David (BEL)	Peugeot–BP–Michelin	+ 18' 03"
