= 1973 UCI Road World Championships – Men's road race =

Men's Individual Road Race
1973 UCI Road World Championships
- Rainbow jersey

Race details
- Dates: 2 September 1973
- Stages: 1
- Distance: 248.6 km (154.5 mi)
- Winning time: 6h 31' 26"

Results
| | Winner | Felice Gimondi (ITA) | (Italy) |
| | Second | Freddy Maertens (BEL) | (Belgium) |
| | Third | Luis Ocaña (ESP) | (Spain) |

The men's road race at the 1973 UCI Road World Championships was the 40th edition of the event. The race took place on Sunday 2 September 1973 in Barcelona, Spain. The race was won by Felice Gimondi of Italy.

== Final classification ==
General classification (1–10)

| Rank | Rider | Time |
|---|---|---|
| 1st place, gold medalist(s) | Felice Gimondi (ITA) | 6h 31' 26" |
| 2nd place, silver medalist(s) | Freddy Maertens (BEL) | + 0" |
| 3rd place, bronze medalist(s) | Luis Ocaña (ESP) | + 0" |
| 4 | Eddy Merckx (BEL) | + 0" |
| 5 | Joop Zoetemelk (NED) | + 1' 46" |
| 6 | Pedro Torres (ESP) | + 1' 46" |
| 7 | Gerard Vianen (NED) | + 1' 46" |
| 8 | Herman Van Springel (BEL) | + 1' 46" |
| 9 | Roberto Poggiali (ITA) | + 1' 46" |
| 10 | Régis Ovion (FRA) | + 1' 46" |
