= Roberto Sorlini =

Italian cyclist

Personal information
- Born: 31 August 1947 (age 79) Darfo Boario Terme, Italy

Cycling career
- Sport: Cycling
- Current team: Retired
- Discipline: Road
- Role: Rider

Professional teams
- 1970: Sagit
- 1971: Cosatto
- 1972: Zonca
- 1973: G.B.C.–Sony–Furzi
- 1974–1978: Filotex
- 1979–1980: Mecap–Hoonved

Roberto Sorlini (born 31 August 1947) is an Italian former racing cyclist. He rode in the 1975 Tour de France as well as seven editions of the Giro d'Italia and the 1978 Vuelta a España.

== Major results ==
1968
2nd Overall Giro della Valle d'Aosta
1971
7th GP Forli
1973
1st Stage 8a Tour de Suisse

=== Grand Tour general classification results timeline ===
Grand Tour	1970	1971	1972	1973	1974	1975	1976	1977	1978	1979
Giro d'Italia	68	38	DNF	95	65	—	62	—	—	94
Tour de France	—	—	—	—	DNF	—	—	—	—	—
Vuelta a España	—	—	—	—	—	—	—	—	60	—
