= Erich Spahn =

Swiss cyclist

Personal information
- Born: 17 September 1948 Dachsen, Switzerland
- Died: 19 December 2009 (aged 61) Dachsen, Switzerland

Cycling career
- Sport: Cycling
- Disciplines: Road; Track

Professional teams
- 1969: Zimba–Mondia
- 1970–1972: G.B.C.–Zimba
- 1971–1973: Möbel Märki–Bonanza
- 1973–1974: Zonca
- 1974: Willner–Birr–Brugg

Erich Spahn (17 September 1948 – 19 December 2009) was a Swiss road and track cyclist. He competed in the 1970 and 1972 Giro d'Italia, and won the Tour du Nord-Ouest in 1971 and 1972.

== Major results ==
1968
6th Overall Tour of Hellas

1st Stages 1 & 7

1969
1st Kaistenberg Rundfahrt
2nd GP du canton d'Argovie
1970
1st Omnium, National Track Championships
1st Six Days of Zürich (with Fritz Pfenninger & Peter Post)
1971
1st Tour du Nord-Ouest
5th Züri-Metzgete
1972
1st Tour du Nord-Ouest
3rd Road race, National Road Championships
4th Overall Tour de Suisse
1974
1st Omnium, National Track Championships
10th Overall Tour de Suisse
