= Cosatto–Marsicano =

Italian professional cycling team (1970–1971)

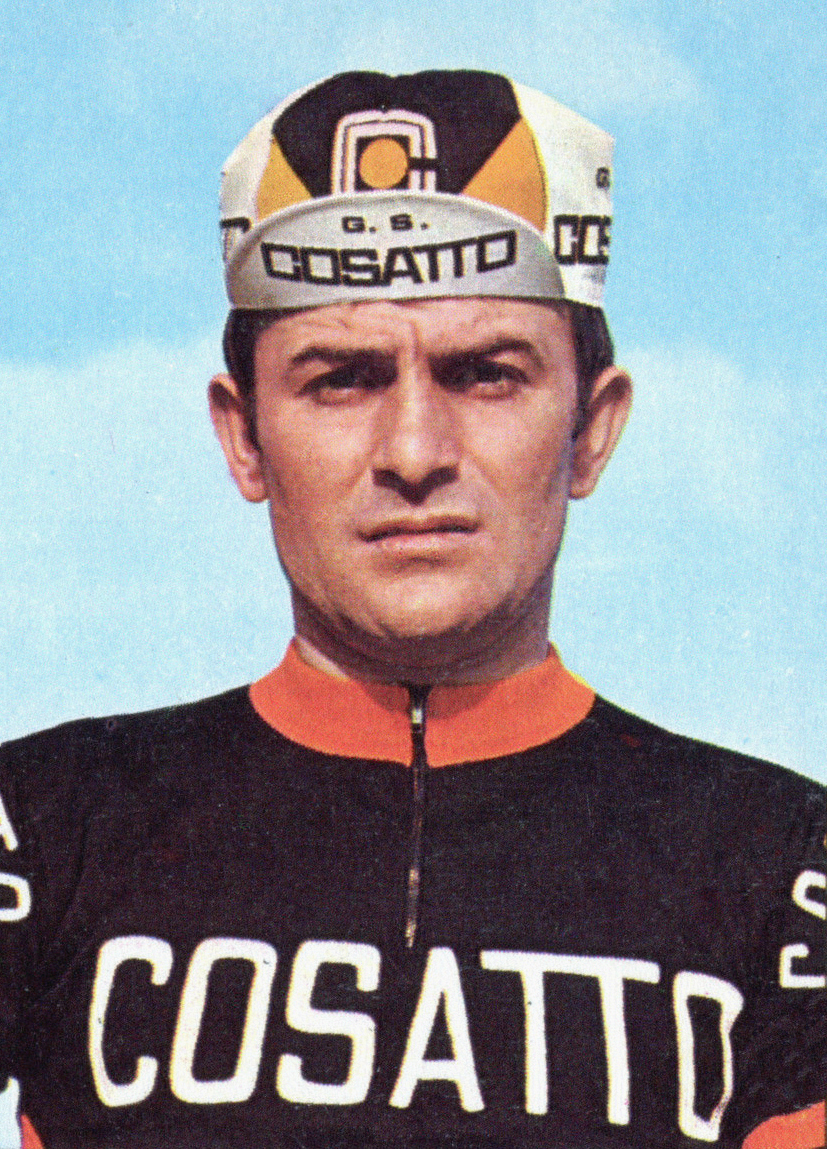
- Wladimiro Panizza, 1971

Team information
- Registered: Italy
- Founded: 1970
- Disbanded: 1971
- Discipline: Road

Key personnel
- Team managers: Piero Bini; Alfredo Martini

Team name history
- 1970–1971: Cosatto–Marsicano

Cosatto–Marsicano was an Italian professional cycling team that existed from 1970 to 1971. The team competed in two editions of the Giro d'Italia.

== Major wins ==
1970
Giro del Belvedere, Flavio Martini
