= Kurt Rub =

Swiss cyclist

Personal information
- Born: 28 February 1946 (age 80) Kleindöttingen, Switzerland

Cycling career
- Sport: Cycling
- Role: Rider

Kurt Rub (born 28 February 1946) is a Swiss former racing cyclist. He was the Swiss National Road Race champion in 1970. He also rode in the 1971 Tour de France.
