= Wilmo Francioni =

Italian cyclist (born 1948)

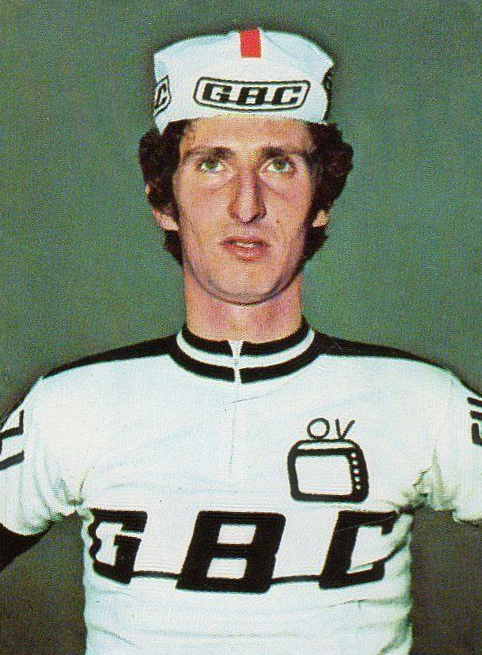
- Francioni c. 1973

Personal information
- Born: 8 November 1948 (age 77) Empoli, Italy

Cycling career
- Sport: Cycling
- Discipline: Road
- Role: Rider
- Rider type: All-rounder

Professional teams
- 1970–1972: Ferretti
- 1973: G.B.C.–Sony–Furzi
- 1974: Sammontana
- 1975–1978: Magniflex

Major wins
- Grand Tours Giro d'Italia 4 individual stages Stages 6 and 15 (1972) Stages 12 and 20 (1977) One-day races and Classics Trofeo Matteotti (1971, 1977) Trofeo Laigueglia (1972) Coppa Sabatini (1974)

Wilmo Francioni (born 8 November 1948) is a retired Italian professional road cyclist. A professional from 1970 to 1978, he competed in all three Grand Tours and represented Italy at the UCI Road World Championships in 1971, 1972 and 1977. During his career, Francioni won four stages of the Giro d'Italia, the Trofeo Matteotti twice, the Trofeo Laigueglia and the Coppa Sabatini. He achieved one of the most notable results of his career with a second-place finish at Milan–San Remo, and recorded his best Grand Tour general classification result with tenth place at the 1977 Giro d'Italia.

== Career ==
Francioni began his professional career in 1970 with the Italian Ferretti team. During his nine-year professional career, he competed in all three Grand Tours, riding eight editions of the Giro d'Italia, the 1971 Tour de France, and the 1975 and 1977 Vuelta a España. He also represented Italy at the UCI Road World Championships in 1971, 1972 and 1977.

In 1971, Francioni won the Trofeo Matteotti. The following year, he won the Trofeo Laigueglia, finishing ahead of a field that included Eddy Merckx, Luis Ocaña and Roger De Vlaeminck. He also won stages 6 and 15 of the 1972 Giro d'Italia.

In 1973, while riding for G.B.C.–Sony–Furzi, Francioni achieved one of the most notable results of his career when he finished second in Milan–San Remo. Near the summit of the Poggio di San Remo with approximately 9 kilometres (5.6 mi) remaining, Francioni attacked the peloton, with Roger De Vlaeminck the only rider able to follow. The pair descended into Sanremo ahead of the chasing group and contested the finish on the Via Roma, where De Vlaeminck defeated Francioni. Felice Gimondi, who led the chase behind, finished third. Francioni finished two seconds behind De Vlaeminck and two seconds ahead of Gimondi.

In 1974, while riding for Sammontana, Francioni won the Coppa Sabatini.

Francioni had one of his most successful seasons in 1977 while riding for Magniflex. He won stages 12 and 20 of the 1977 Giro d'Italia and finished tenth in the general classification, his best overall result in a Grand Tour. He also won the Trofeo Matteotti for a second time and finished third in the Trofeo Pantalica. Later that year, he represented Italy at the 1977 UCI Road World Championships in San Cristóbal, Venezuela.

Francioni retired from professional cycling in 1978.

== Major results ==
1967

1st Gran Premio Industria del Cuoio e delle Pelli

1968

1st La Nazionale a Romito Magra
1st Gran Premio Industria del Cuoio e delle Pelli
2nd Firenze–Viareggio

1969

1st Giro delle Valli Aretine
1st Coppa Città del Marmo
1st Coppa Giulio Burci
2nd Overall Tour des Abruzzes

1971

1st Trofeo Matteotti
2nd Coppa Bernocchi

1972

1st Trofeo Laigueglia
Giro d'Italia

1st Stages 6 and 15

1st Gran Premio Cecina
2nd GP Montelupo
3rd Gran Premio Città di Camaiore

1973

2nd Milan–San Remo

1974

1st Coppa Sabatini
2nd Sassari–Cagliari

1976

2nd Coppa Sabatini

1977

1st Trofeo Matteotti
10th Overall Giro d'Italia

1st Stages 12 and 20

3rd Trofeo Pantalica
