= Lino Farisato =

Italian cyclist

Personal information
- Born: 15 March 1945 (age 81)

Cycling career
- Sport: Cycling
- Role: Rider

Lino Farisato (born 15 March 1945) is an Italian racing cyclist. He won stage 13 of the 1968 Giro d'Italia and stage 19 of the 1971 Giro d'Italia.
