= Enrico Maggioni =

Italian cyclist

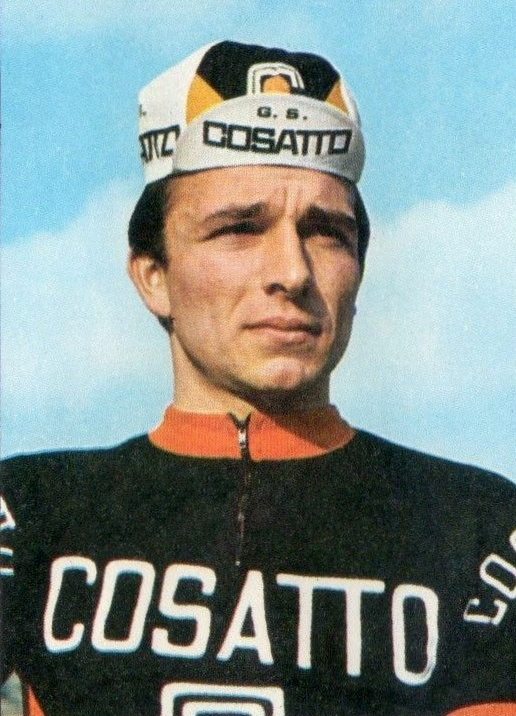
- Enrico Maggioni in 1971

Personal information
- Born: 1 November 1946 (age 79) Missaglia, Italy

Cycling career
- Sport: Cycling
- Role: Rider

Enrico Maggioni (born 1 November 1946) is an Italian retired professional racing cyclist. He rode in the 1976 Tour de France.
