= Arnaldo Caverzasi =

Italian cyclist

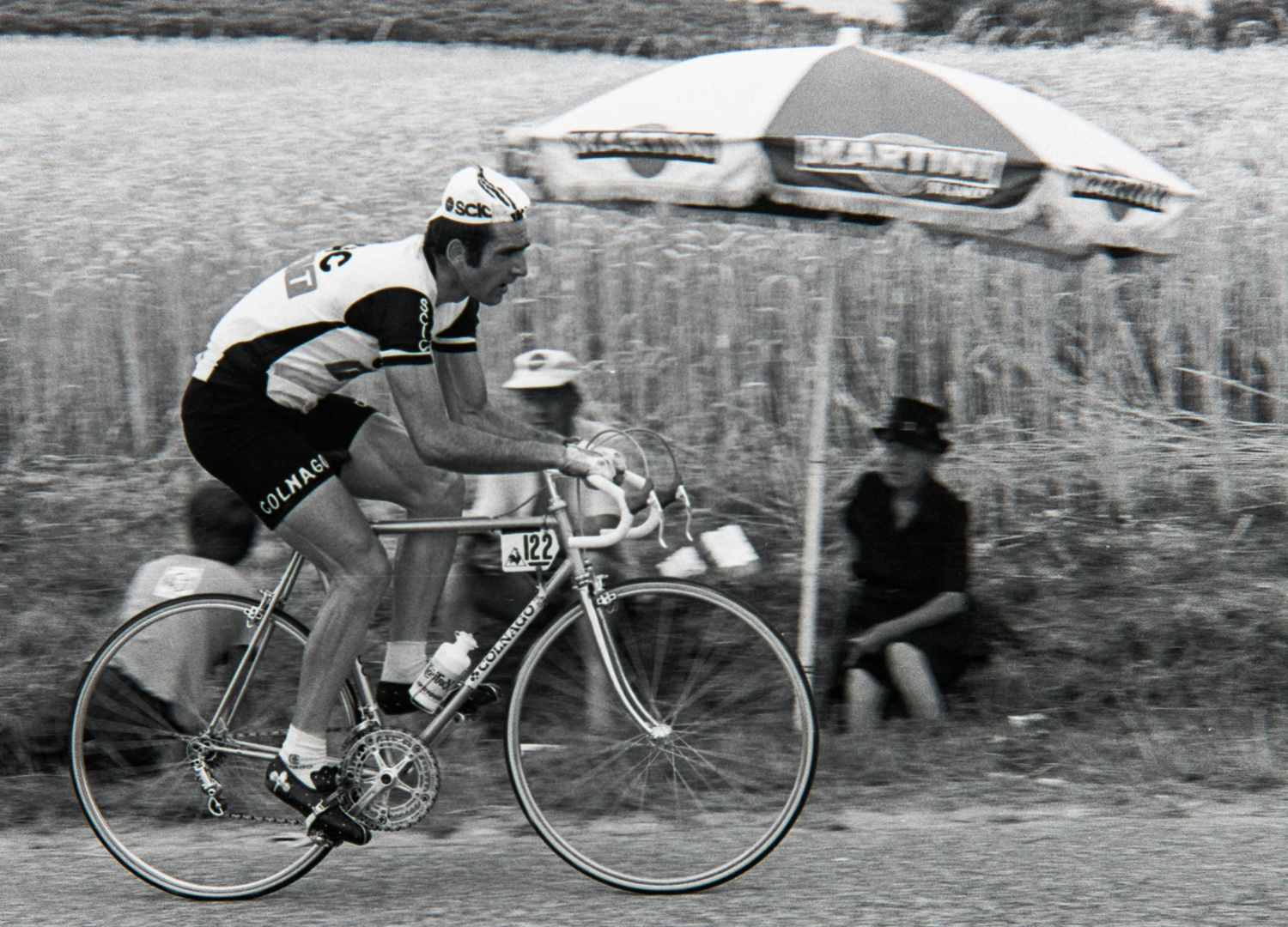
- Caverzasi in 1976

Personal information
- Born: 12 January 1948 (age 78) Besano, Italy

Cycling career
- Sport: Cycling
- Role: Rider

Arnaldo Caverzasi (born 12 January 1948) is an Italian former professional racing cyclist. He rode in the 1975 Tour de France and 1976 Tour de France.
