= André Poppe =

Belgian cyclist

Personal information
- Born: 4 November 1943 (age 82)

Cycling career
- Sport: Cycling
- Role: Rider

André Poppe (born 4 November 1943) is a Belgian racing cyclist. He competed in four editions of the Tour de France between 1968 and 1972.
