= Vicente López Carril =

Spanish cyclist (1942–1980)

Vicente López
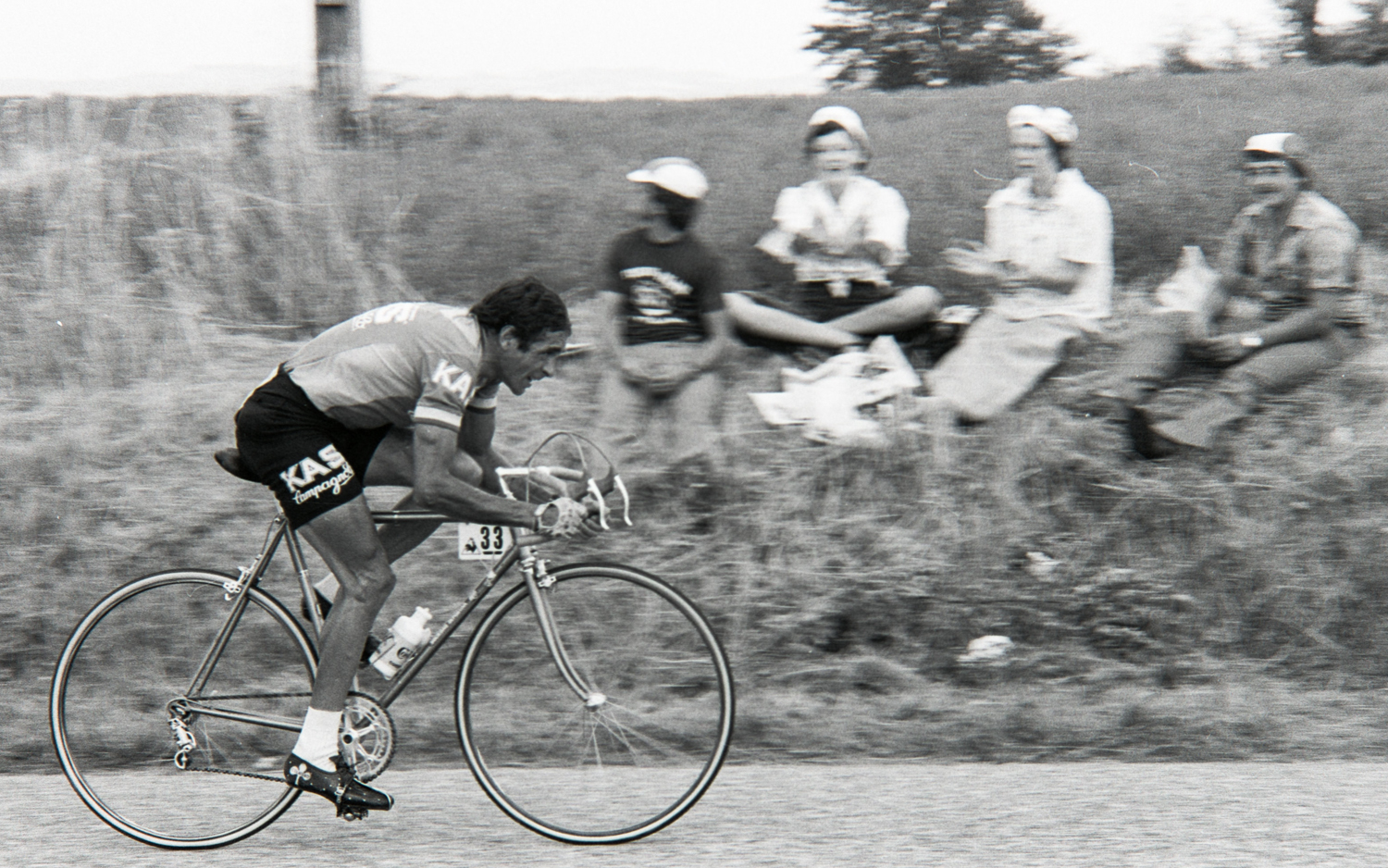

Personal information
- Full name: Vicente López Carril
- Born: 2 December 1942 A Coruña, Spain
- Died: 29 March 1980 (aged 37) Gijón, Spain

Cycling career
- Sport: Cycling
- Discipline: Road
- Role: Rider

Professional teams
- 1966–1975: Kas–Kaskol
- 1976–1978: Kas–Campagnolo
- 1979: Teka

Major wins
- Spain Road Race Championship (1974); Giro d'Italia, 1 stage Tour de France, 3 stages Vuelta a España, 1 stage

Vicente López Carril (2 December 1942, A Coruña, province of A Coruña – 29 March 1980, Gijón, Asturias) was a Spanish professional road racing cyclist from A Coruña. He finished among the top ten riders in the overall classification of several Grand Tours and third in 1974 Tour de France. During his career he also won three stages of Tour de France, as well as a stage in both Giro d'Italia and Vuelta a España.

== Major results ==
1971
Trofeo Elola
Giro d'Italia:

Winner stage 5

Tour de France:

10th place overall classification

1972
GP Navarra
1973
Tour de France:

Winner stage 9
9th place overall classification

1974
Le Creusot
Spain National Road Race Championship
Tour de France:

Winner stage 11
3rd place overall classification

1975
Saussignac
Vuelta a Levante
Tour de France:

Winner stage 17
5th place overall classification

1976
Vuelta a España:

Winner stage 15

Tour de France:

10th place overall classification

1977
GP Navarra
Klasika Primavera
Prueba Villafranca de Ordizia
Vuelta Ciclista Asturias

== See also ==
- List of doping cases in cycling
