= Primo Mori =

Italian cyclist

Personal information
- Full name: Primo Mori
- Born: 7 April 1944 (age 82) San Miniato, Italy

Cycling career
- Sport: Cycling
- Discipline: Road
- Role: Rider

Major wins
- 1 stage 1970 Tour de France

Primo Mori (San Miniato, 7 April 1944) was an Italian professional road bicycle racer.

== Major results ==
1969
1969 Giro d'Italia:

8th place overall classification

1970
Tour de France:

Winner stage 13
