= Felice Gimondi =

Italian cyclist (1942–2019)

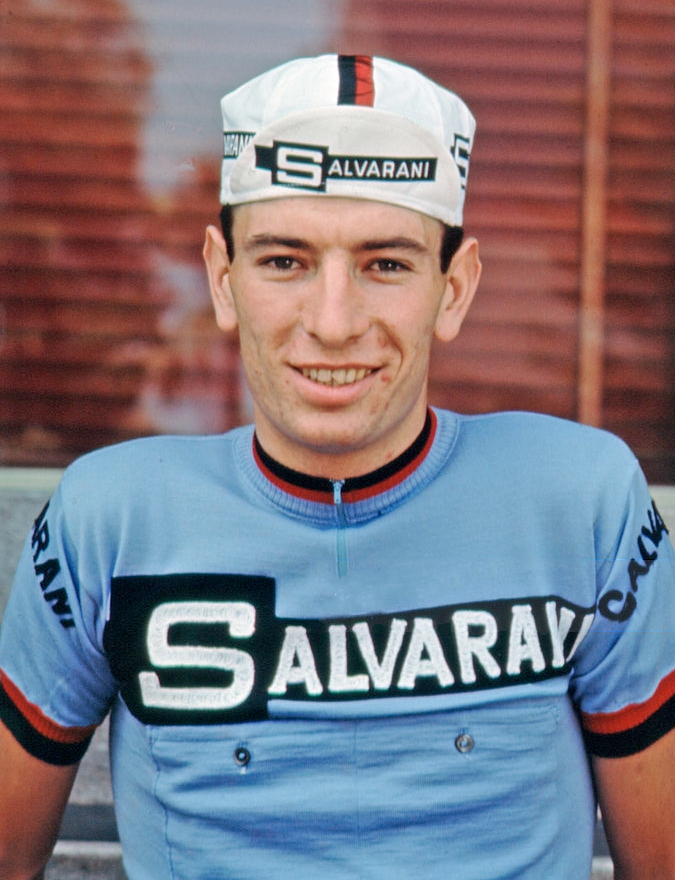
- Gimondi at the 1966 Giro d'Italia

Personal information
- Full name: Felice Gimondi
- Nickname: La Fenice (The Phoenix)
- Born: 29 September 1942 Sedrina, Italy
- Died: 16 August 2019 (aged 76) Giardini Naxos, Italy
- Height: 1.81 m (5 ft 11 1/2 in)
- Weight: 78 kg (172 lb; 12 st 4 lb)

Cycling career
- Sport: Cycling
- Discipline: Classics
- Role: Rider
- Rider type: All-rounder

Professional teams
- 1965–1972: Salvarani
- 1973–1979: Bianchi–Campagnolo

Major wins
- Grand Tours Tour de France General classification (1965) 7 individual stages (1965, 1967, 1969, 1975) Giro d'Italia General classification (1967, 1969, 1976) 6 individual stages (1966, 1968, 1971, 1973, 1976) Vuelta a España General classification (1968) 1 individual stage (1968) Stage races Volta a Catalunya (1972) Tour de Romandie (1969) One-day races and Classics World Road Race Championships (1973) National Road Race Championships (1968, 1972) Milan–San Remo (1974) Paris–Roubaix (1966) Giro di Lombardia (1966, 1973)
Medal record
Representing Italy
Men's road bicycle racing
UCI Road World Championships
Gold medal – first place	1973 Barcelona	Elite road race
Silver medal – second place	1971 Mendrisio	Elite road race
Bronze medal – third place	1970 Leicester	Elite road race

Felice Gimondi (Italian pronunciation: [feˈliːtʃe dʒiˈmondi]; 29 September 1942 – 16 August 2019) was an Italian professional racing cyclist. With his 1968 victory at the Vuelta a España, only three years after becoming a professional cyclist, Gimondi, nicknamed "The Phoenix", was the second cyclist (after Jacques Anquetil) to win all three Grand Tours of road cycling: Tour de France (1965, his first year as a pro), Giro d'Italia (1967, 1969 and 1976), and Vuelta a España (1968). He is one of only eight cyclists to have done so.

Gimondi also won the 1973 World Championship road race, as well as three of the five Cycling monuments, winning the Giro di Lombardia twice, and finished on the podium of a grand tour twelve times.

He accomplished all of these major victories despite his career coinciding with that of Eddy Merckx.

== Biography ==
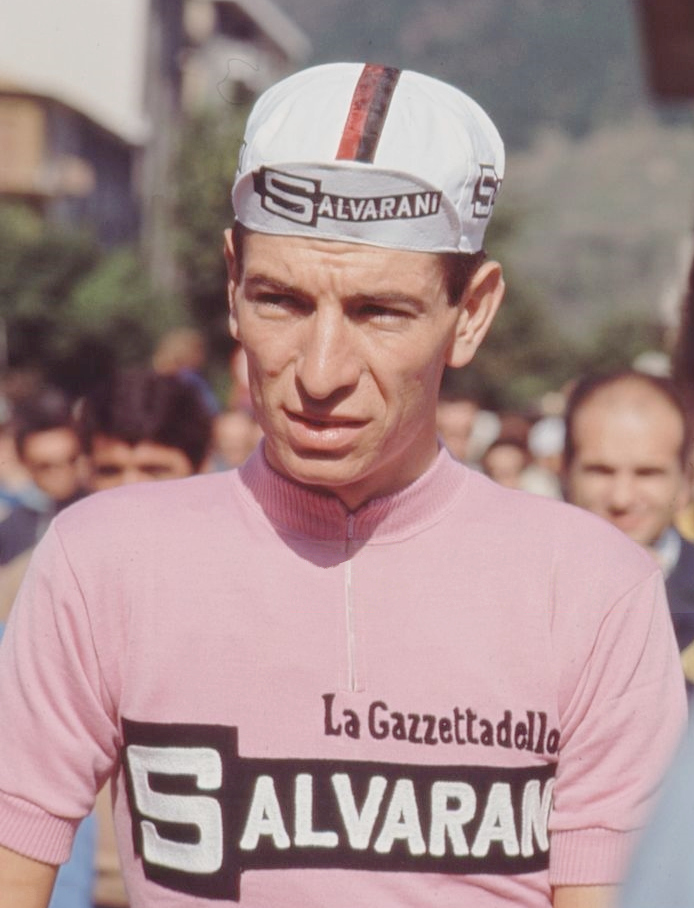
Gimondi at the start of the 22nd stage of the 1967 Giro d'Italia

Gimondi was born on 29 September 1942 in Sedrina in the Province of Bergamo. He was the son of a transport manager and a post mistress. In his youth, he frequently took his mother's post bicycle and later helped to deliver mail on it. In 1964, Gimondi rode the road race at the 1964 Olympic Games, where he finished in 33rd place. After winning the Tour de l'Avenir, he was signed, in 1965, as a professional to the Salvarani team. With the withdrawal of another cyclist from Salvarani's 1965 Tour de France team, Gimondi was added at the last minute and later recalled that he had to ask his mother for permission to start the race. He took the yellow jersey on stage 3, but lost the race lead later when he waited for his nominal team captain Vittorio Adorni. Adorni later dropped out, leaving Gimondi to fight out the overall victory with Raymond Poulidor, securing the Tour in the final time trial.

His early successes led to him being regarded as a successor to well-renowned fellow Italian Fausto Coppi, nicknamed campionissimo. Gimondi's career coincided for the most part with that of highly-successful Eddy Merckx. However, Gimondi was able to build up a respectable palmarès himself, even through the era of Merckx' dominance.

After winning the 1967 Giro d'Italia and the 1968 Vuelta a España, Gimondi had become the second-ever rider to have won all three Grand Tours after Jacques Anquetil. He won the Giro a further two times, first in 1969. In 1976, Gimondi was not counted among the favourites, being regarded as past his prime, but overcame a deficit on race leader Johan De Muynck in the final time trial to take his third victory in the race. His success was subsequently called the "miracle in Milan".

His other successes include four victories in the so-called "monument classics", winning Paris–Roubaix in 1966, Milan–San Remo in 1974 and the Giro di Lombardia twice (1966 and 1973). In the 1973 World Championship road race, he formed a group with Luis Ocaña and Freddy Maertens to bridge a gap to Merckx, who had attacked earlier. At the finish, he outsprinted Maertens to clinch the title. He had already placed third in 1970 and second in 1971. Gimondi also won Paris–Brussels twice, in 1966 and 1976.

He failed twice to pass doping controls, first in the 1968 Giro d'Italia and then at the 1975 Tour de France. His positive test at the 1968 Giro was for the stimulant Fencamfamin, but since the substance was not on the prohibited list at the time, he kept his third place overall at the race. At the 1975 Tour, he received a 10-minute time penalty.

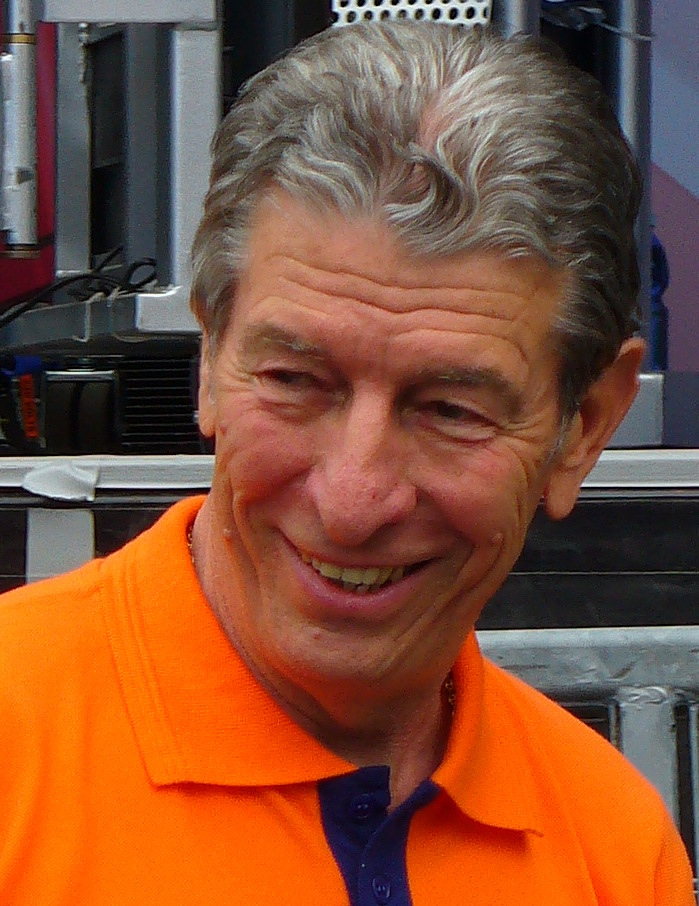
Gimondi in 2009

A major cyclosportive event is named in his honour, the Gran Fondo Felice Gimondi, held annually around Bergamo. Since 2019, it honours all seven riders to have won all three Grand Tours.

Throughout his career and after it, Gimondi was closely associated with the bicycle manufacturer Bianchi. In the late 1980s, Gimondi was briefly directeur sportif at the Gewiss–Bianchi team. He served as manager for Bianchi's mountain-bike team for a long period of time. Between 2000 and 2001, Gimondi briefly worked as president of the Mercatone Uno–Albacom team and as an advisor to Marco Pantani. At the end of the 1998 Tour de France, race organiser Jean-Marie Leblanc invited Gimondi onto the stage during the podium celebration, when Pantani became the first Italian winner of the race since he had himself won the event in 1965. In 2008, Gimondi was the president of the TX Active – Bianchi cycling team which specializes in MTB races.

In 1968, Gimondi married Tiziana Bersano, with whom he had two daughters, Norma and Federica.

Gimondi died on 16 August 2019 after suffering a heart attack while swimming on vacation in Sicily. He was 76. His funeral was held on 20 August in Paladina near Bergamo, attended by thousands of people. His long-time rival Eddy Merckx did not attend, stating that he was "too saddened" by the loss of his friend.

== Career achievements ==
=== Major results ===
1963
1st Giro del Friuli
1964
1st Overall Tour de l'Avenir

1st Stage 1

1965
1st Overall Tour de France

1st Stages 3, 18 (ITT) & 22 (ITT)

2nd La Flèche Wallonne
3rd Overall Giro d'Italia
3rd Tre Valli Varesine
4th Overall Tour de Romandie
1966
1st Paris–Roubaix
1st Giro di Lombardia
1st Paris–Brussels
1st Coppa Agostoni
1st Coppa Placci
1st GP Valsassina
2nd Trofeo Matteotti
2nd Critérium des As
2nd Grand Prix des Nations
2nd Gran Premio di Lugano
2nd Boucles de l'Aulne
3rd Giro di Toscana
5th Overall Giro d'Italia

1st Stage 20

8th Tre Valli Varesine
9th Overall Tour of Belgium
10th Overall Tour de Romandie

1st Stage 3b (ITT)

10th Tour of Flanders
10th La Flèche Wallonne
1967
1st Overall Giro d'Italia
1st Grand Prix des Nations
1st Giro del Lazio
1st Gran Premio di Lugano
1st GP Forlì
2nd Giro di Lombardia
2nd Ronde de Seignelay
3rd Overall Escalada a Montjuïc
3rd Critérium des As
3rd Coppa Bernocchi
4th Road race, National Road Championships
4th Tour of Flanders
4th Milan–San Remo
4th À travers Lausanne
7th Overall Tour de France

1st Stages 10 & 20

10th Trofeo Laigueglia
1968
1st Road race, National Road Championships (Giro di Romagna)
1st Overall Vuelta a España

1st Stage 17 (ITT)

1st Trofeo Baracchi
1st Grand Prix des Nations
1st Critérium des As
1st Flèche Enghiennoise
2nd Volta a Catalunya
2nd Overall À travers Lausanne
2nd Gran Premio di Lugano
3rd Overall Giro d'Italia

1st Stage 16 (ITT)

3rd Overall Paris–Luxembourg
3rd Gent–Wevelgem
3rd Boucles de l'Aulne
4th La Flèche Wallonne
6th Road race, UCI Road World Championships
7th Giro di Lombardia
8th Overall Giro di Sardegna
8th Trofeo Laigueglia
10th Tirreno–Adriatico
1969
1st Overall Giro d'Italia
1st Overall Tour de Romandie
1st Giro dell'Appennino
2nd Overall Paris–Luxembourg

1st Stage 1

2nd Overall Escalada a Montjuïc

1st Stage 1a

2nd Tour of Flanders
3rd Giro dell'Emilia
4th Overall Tour de France

1st Stage 12

4th Paris–Roubaix
4th Barcelona-Andorra
7th Liège–Bastogne–Liège
8th Trofeo Dicen
1970
1st Overall (TTT) Cronostaffetta
1st Trofeo Matteotti
2nd Overall Giro d'Italia
2nd Giro di Lombardia
2nd Road race, National Road Championships
2nd Giro del Veneto
2nd Genoa–Nice
2nd Mont Faron hill climb
3rd Overall Tirreno–Adriatico

1st Stage 5b (ITT)

3rd Overall Giro di Sardegna
3rd Road race, UCI Road World Championships
3rd Tre Valli Varesine
5th Overall À travers Lausanne
8th Overall Tour de Suisse

1st Stage 6

9th Giro dell'Emilia
9th Coppa Placci
1971
1st Giro del Piemonte
1st Grand Prix de Wallonie
1st Prologue Tour de Romandie
1st Stage 2b (ITT) Cronostaffetta
2nd Road race, UCI Road World Championships
2nd Road race, National Road Championships
2nd Milan–San Remo
2nd Gran Premio Città di Camaiore
2nd GP Industria & Artigianato di Larciano
4th Coppa Placci
4th Coppa Bernocchi
5th Overall Volta a Catalunya
7th Overall Giro d'Italia

1st Stages 7 & 18

8th Paris–Roubaix
9th Overall Giro di Sardegna
9th Liège–Bastogne–Liège
9th Giro di Lombardia
9th Tre Valli Varesine
1972
1st Road race, National Road Championships (Giro dell'Appennino)
1st Overall Volta a Catalunya

1st Stage 5b (ITT)

1st Gran Premio di Lugano
2nd Overall Tour de France
2nd Gent–Wevelgem
2nd Giro del Piemonte
2nd Trofeo Baracchi
3rd Giro di Lombardia
3rd Giro dell'Emilia
5th Giro della Romagna
6th Overall Tirreno–Adriatico
8th Overall Giro d'Italia
9th Giro di Toscana
10th Road race, UCI Road World Championships
1973
1st Road race, UCI World Road Championships
1st Overall Giro di Puglia

1st Stage 1

1st Giro di Lombardia
1st Giro del Piemonte
1st Trofeo Baracchi
1st Coppa Bernocchi
2nd Overall Giro d'Italia

1st Stage 16 (ITT)

2nd Overall À travers Lausanne
2nd Critérium des As
3rd Milan–San Remo
5th Giro della Romagna
6th Overall Tour de Romandie
6th Grand Prix of Aargau Canton
7th Giro dell'Emilia
10th Paris–Brussels
1974
1st Milan–San Remo
1st Coppa Agostoni
2nd Road race, National Road Championships
2nd Overall À travers Lausanne

1st Stage 1

3rd Overall Giro d'Italia
3rd Trofeo Laigueglia
3rd Giro dell'Umbria
6th Gran Premio di Lugano
6th Giro di Campania
7th Paris–Brussels
1975
1st Overall Cronostaffetta

1st Stage 1b (ITT)

2nd Giro dell'Emilia
3rd Overall Giro d'Italia
3rd Coppa Placci
4th Overall Setmana Catalana de Ciclisme
5th Overall Tirreno–Adriatico
6th Overall Tour de France

1st Stage 10

6th Overall À travers Lausanne
7th Overall Giro di Puglia
7th Milano–Torino
7th Gran Premio Città di Camaiore
9th Coppa Sabatini
1976
1st Overall Giro d'Italia

1st Stage 21

1st Paris–Brussels
5th Giro del Lazio
7th Road race, UCI Road World Championships
7th Overall Tirreno–Adriatico
8th Giro dell'Emilia
8th Coppa Placci
1977
2nd Giro del Lazio
4th Overall Tour de Romandie
5th Overall Escalada a Montjuïc
6th Giro di Toscana
10th Overall Giro di Puglia
1978
2nd Châteauroux Classic
10th Critérium des As

=== Grand Tour results timeline ===
Grand Tour	1965	1966	1967	1968	1969	1970	1971	1972	1973	1974	1975	1976	1977	1978
Vuelta a España	—	—	—	1	—	—	—	—	—	—	—	—	—	—
Giro d'Italia	3	5	1	3	1	2	7	8	2	3	3	1	15	11
Tour de France	1	—	7	—	4	—	—	2	—	—	6	—	—	—
