= Guerrino Tosello =

Italian cyclist

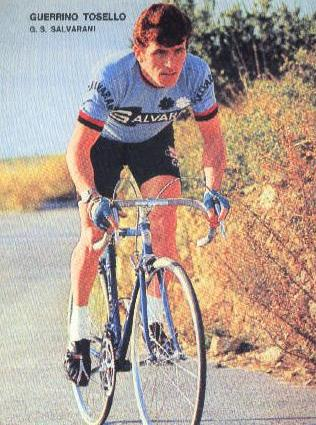

Personal information
- Born: 14 October 1943 (age 83)

Cycling career
- Sport: Cycling
- Role: Rider

Guerrino Tosello (born 14 October 1943) is an Italian racing cyclist. He won stage 7 of the 1968 Giro d'Italia.
