= Silvano Schiavon =

Italian cyclist

Personal information
- Born: 4 November 1942
- Died: 21 October 1977 (aged 34)

Cycling career
- Sport: Cycling
- Role: Rider

Silvano Schiavon (4 November 1942 – 21 October 1977) was an Italian racing cyclist. He rode in the 1970 Tour de France and finished fourth in the 1969 Giro d'Italia.
