= Ferretti (cycling team) =

Italian professional cycling team

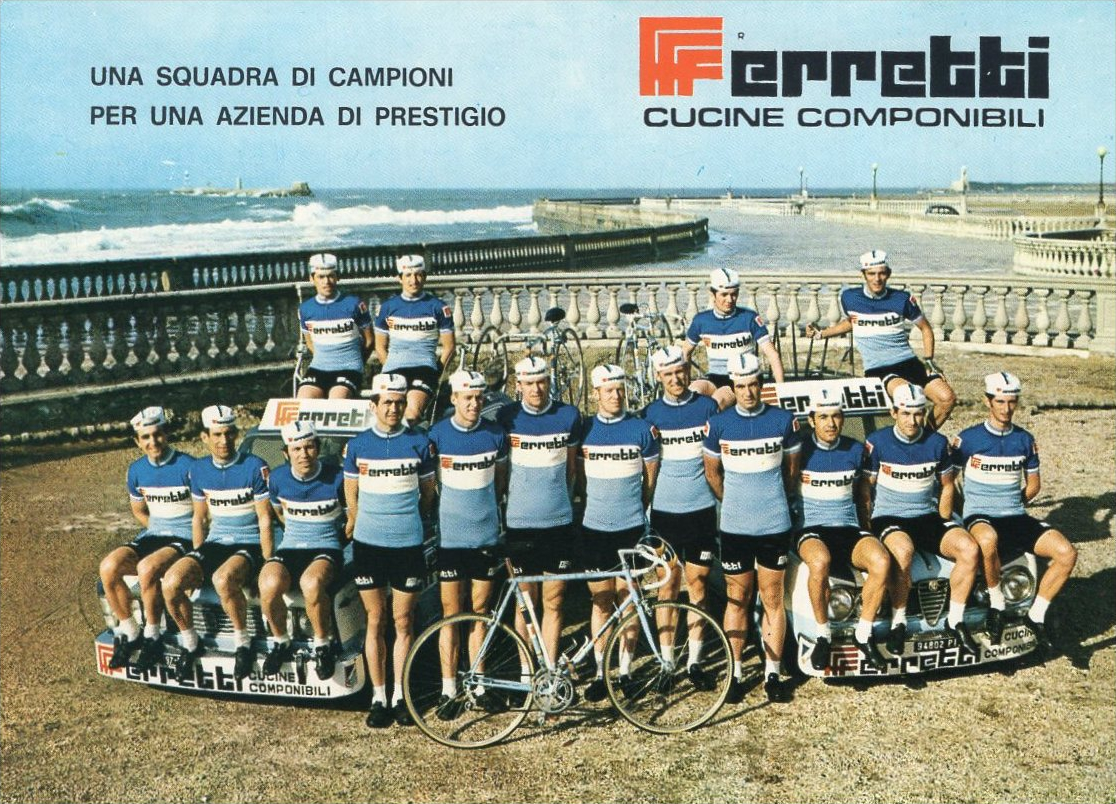
- The Ferretti team of 1971

Team information
- Registered: Italy
- Founded: 1969
- Disbanded: 1972
- Discipline: Road

Key personnel
- General manager: Alfredo Martini; Franco Spadoni

Team name history
- 1969–1972: Ferretti

Ferretti was an Italian professional cycling team that existed from 1969 to 1972. It was sponsored by the Ferretti kitchen company, based in Capannoli. Gösta Pettersson won the general classification of the 1971 Giro d'Italia with the team.
