= Salvarani (cycling team) =

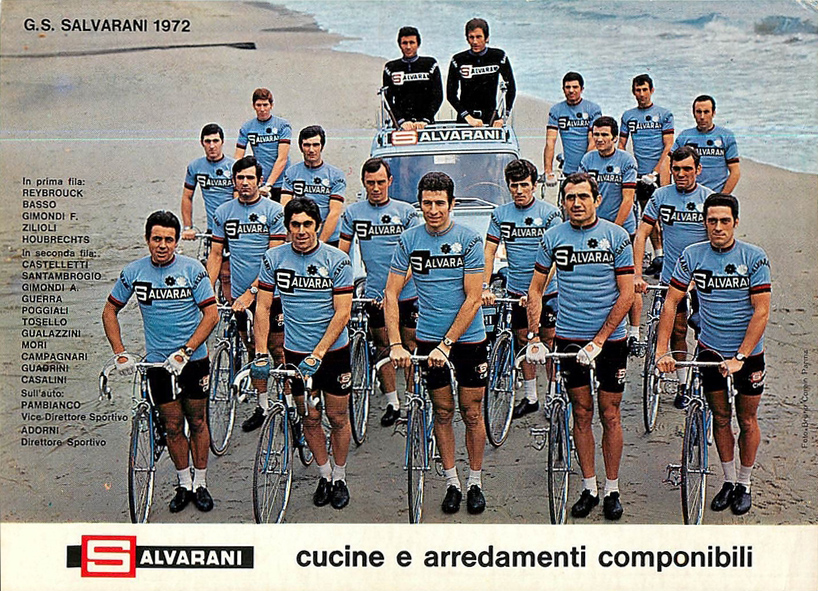
- The Salvarani team of 1972

Team information
- Registered: Italy
- Founded: 1963
- Disbanded: 1972
- Discipline: Road

Team name history
- 1963–1972: Salvarani

Salvarani was an Italian professional cycling team that existed from 1963 to 1972. The team was sponsored by the Italian kitchen components maker Salvarani.

== Major wins ==
1965
Overall Giro d'Italia, Vittorio Adorni
Overall Tour de Romandie, Vittorio Adorni
Overall Tour de France, Felice Gimondi

1966
Paris–Roubaix, Felice Gimondi
Overall Tour de l'Avenir, Mino Denti
Giro di Lombardia, Felice Gimondi

1967
Overall Giro d'Italia, Felice Gimondi

Points classification, Dino Zandegù

Grand Prix des Nations, Felice Gimondi

1968
Milan–San Remo, Rudi Altig
Overall Vuelta a España, Felice Gimondi
Critérium des As, Felice Gimondi
Grand Prix des Nations, Felice Gimondi

1969
Overall Giro d'Italia, Felice Gimondi

1970
Points classification Tour de France, Walter Godefroot
Overall Tour de Suisse, Roberto Poggiali
