= Major one week stage races (cycling) =

Group of seven prestigious cycling stage races

In road bicycle racing, the major one-week stage races or big seven stage races are a group of seven elite men's stage races held as part of the UCI WorldTour: Paris–Nice, Tirreno–Adriatico, Volta a Catalunya, Tour of the Basque Country, Tour de Romandie, Tour Auvergne-Rhône-Alpes and Tour de Suisse. All the races are held in the spring between March and June (with Paris–Nice and Tirreno–Adriatico held simultaneously) and include between 6 and 8 stages. The races are grouped together due to their historic prestige and strength of competition, although they exist a tier below the Grand Tours in prominence and UCI ranking points.

Sean Kelly won a record 14 majors from 1982 to 1990. Primož Roglič is second with 11 wins, and is one of two riders to win six different major one-week races alongside Tadej Pogačar. Eddy Merckx, Richie Porte and Jonas Vingegaard are third with five different wins.

In 2025, João Almeida became the most recent cyclist to win three major races in a single season (fourth in history with this achievement).

== Full list ==
=== 7 major one week stage races ===
Since	Race	Date	Stages	Most wins	Editions
1933	(France) Paris–Nice	March	8	(Republic of Ireland) Sean Kelly (7x)	84
1966	(Italy) Tirreno–Adriatico	March	7	(Belgium) Roger De Vlaeminck (6x)	61
1911	(Spain) Volta a Catalunya	March	7	(Spain) (Spain) (Spain) Mariano Cañardo (7x)	105
1924	(Spain) Tour of the Basque Country	April	6	(Spain) José Antonio González (4x) (Spain) Alberto Contador (4x)	65
1947	(Switzerland) Tour de Romandie	April–May	5 + prologue	(Republic of Ireland) Stephen Roche (3x)	79
1947	(France) Tour Auvergne-Rhône-Alpes (Note: Tour Auvergne-Rhône-Alpes was known as Critérium du Dauphiné until the end of 2025 edition and renamed right the next day.)	June	8	(France) Nello Lauredi (3x) (Spain) Luis Ocaña (3x) (France) Bernard Hinault (3x) (France) Charly Mottet (3x) (United Kingdom) Chris Froome (3x)	78
1933	(Switzerland) Tour de Suisse	June	8	(Italy) Pasquale Fornara (4x)	89

- Between Volta a Catalunya (1911) and Tour de Suisse (2026) there have been total 561 major one week stage races held.

=== Jersey colors ===
Race	General	Points	Mountains	Young rider	Team	Combativity
(France) Paris–Nice						
(Italy) Tirreno–Adriatico					no jersey	N/A
(Spain) Volta a Catalunya						
(Spain) Tour of the Basque Country						
(Switzerland) Tour de Romandie					no jersey	
(France) Auvergne-Rhône-Alpes						
(Switzerland) Tour de Suisse						

== All winners by years ==
Year	Paris–Nice	Tirreno–Adriatico	Volta a Catalunya	Tour of the Basque Country	Tour de Romandie	Auvergne-Rhône-Alpes	Tour de Suisse	Year
1911	started in 1933	started in 1966	(Spain) Sebastián Masdeu	started in 1924	started in 1947	started in 1947	started in 1933	1911
1912	started in 1933	started in 1966	(Spain) José Magdalena	started in 1924	started in 1947	started in 1947	started in 1933	1912
1913	started in 1933	started in 1966	(Spain) Juan Martí	started in 1924	started in 1947	started in 1947	started in 1933	1911
1914	started in 1933	started in 1966	cancelled due to World War I	started in 1924	started in 1947	started in 1947	started in 1933	1914
1915	started in 1933	started in 1966	cancelled due to World War I	started in 1924	started in 1947	started in 1947	started in 1933	1915
1916	started in 1933	started in 1966	cancelled due to World War I	started in 1924	started in 1947	started in 1947	started in 1933	1916
1917	started in 1933	started in 1966	cancelled due to World War I	started in 1924	started in 1947	started in 1947	started in 1933	1917
1918	started in 1933	started in 1966	cancelled due to World War I	started in 1924	started in 1947	started in 1947	started in 1933	1918
1919	started in 1933	started in 1966	cancelled due to World War I	started in 1924	started in 1947	started in 1947	started in 1933	1919
1920	started in 1933	started in 1966	(France) José Pelletier	started in 1924	started in 1947	started in 1947	started in 1933	1920
1921	started in 1933	started in 1966	no races	started in 1924	started in 1947	started in 1947	started in 1933	191
1922	started in 1933	started in 1966	no races	started in 1924	started in 1947	started in 1947	started in 1933	1922
1923	started in 1933	started in 1966	(France) Maurice Ville	started in 1924	started in 1947	started in 1947	started in 1933	1923
1924	started in 1933	started in 1966	(Spain) Mució Miquel (1/2)	(France) Francis Pélissier	started in 1947	started in 1947	started in 1933	1924
1925	started in 1933	started in 1966	(Spain) Mució Miquel (2/2)	(Belgium) Auguste Verdyck	started in 1947	started in 1947	started in 1933	1925
1926	started in 1933	started in 1966	(France) Víctor Fontan (1/3)	(Luxembourg) Nicolas Frantz	started in 1947	started in 1947	started in 1933	1926
1927	started in 1933	started in 1966	(France) Victor Fontan (2/3)	(France) Victor Fontan (3/3)	started in 1947	started in 1947	started in 1933	1927
1928	started in 1933	started in 1966	(Spain) Mariano Cañardo (1/8)	(Belgium) Maurice De Waele (1/2)	started in 1947	started in 1947	started in 1933	1928
1929	started in 1933	started in 1966	(Spain) Mariano Cañardo (2/8)	(Belgium) Maurice De Waele (2/2)	started in 1947	started in 1947	started in 1933	1929
1930	started in 1933	started in 1966	(Spain) Mariano Cañardo (3/8)	(Spain) Mariano Cañardo (4/8)	started in 1947	started in 1947	started in 1933	1930
1931	started in 1933	started in 1966	(Spain) Salvador Cardona	no races	started in 1947	started in 1947	started in 1933	1931
1932	started in 1933	started in 1966	(Spain) Mariano Cañardo (5/8)	no races	started in 1947	started in 1947	started in 1933	1932
1933	(Belgium) Alphonse Schepers	started in 1966	(Italy) Alfredo Bovet	no races	started in 1947	started in 1947	(Austria) Max Bulla	1933
1934	(Belgium) Gaston Rebry	started in 1966	(Italy) Bernardo Rogora	no races	started in 1947	started in 1947	(Germany) Ludwig Geyer	1934
1935	(France) René Vietto	started in 1966	(Spain) Mariano Cañardo (6/8)	(Italy) Gino Bartali (1/4)	started in 1947	started in 1947	(France) Gaspard Rinaldi	1935
1936	(France) Maurice Archambaud (1/2)	started in 1966	(Spain) Mariano Cañardo (7/8)	longer break with no races	started in 1947	started in 1947	(Belgium) Henri Garnier	1936
1937	(France) Roger Lapébie	started in 1966	cancelled due to Spanish Civil War	longer break with no races	started in 1947	started in 1947	(Switzerland) Karl Litschi	1937
1938	(Belgium) Jules Lowie	started in 1966	cancelled due to Spanish Civil War	longer break with no races	started in 1947	started in 1947	(Italy) Giovanni Valetti	1938
1939	(France) Maurice Archambaud (2/2)	started in 1966	(Spain) Mariano Cañardo (8/8)	longer break with no races	started in 1947	started in 1947	(Switzerland) Robert Zimmermann	1939
1940	cancelled due to World War II	started in 1966	(Luxembourg) Christophe Didier	longer break with no races	started in 1947	started in 1947	no race	1940
1941	cancelled due to World War II	started in 1966	(Spain) Antonio Andrés Sancho	longer break with no races	started in 1947	started in 1947	(Switzerland) Josef Wagner	1941
1942	cancelled due to World War II	started in 1966	(Spain) Fédérico Ezquerra	longer break with no races	started in 1947	started in 1947	(Switzerland) Ferdinand Kübler (1/5)	1942
1943	cancelled due to World War II	started in 1966	(Spain) Julián Berrendero (1/2)	longer break with no races	started in 1947	started in 1947	no races	1943
1944	cancelled due to World War II	started in 1966	(Spain) Miguel Casas	longer break with no races	started in 1947	started in 1947	no races	1944
1945	cancelled due to World War II	started in 1966	(Spain) Bernardo Ruiz	longer break with no races	started in 1947	started in 1947	no races	1945
1946	(Italy) Fermo Camellini	started in 1966	(Spain) Julián Berrendero (2/2)	longer break with no races	started in 1947	started in 1947	(Italy) Gino Bartali (2/4)	1946
1947	no races	started in 1966	(Spain) Emilio Rodríguez (1/2)	longer break with no races	(Belgium) Désiré Keteleer	(Poland) Edward Klabiński	(Italy) Gino Bartali (3/4)	1947
1948	no races	started in 1966	(Spain) Emilio Rodríguez (2/2)	longer break with no races	(Switzerland) Ferdinand Kübler (2/5)	(France) Édouard Fachleitner (1/2)	(Switzerland) Ferdinand Kübler (3/5)	1948
1949	no races	started in 1966	(France) Émile Rol	longer break with no races	(Italy) Gino Bartali (4/4)	(France) Lucien Lazaridès	(Switzerland) Gottfried Weilenmann	1949
1950	no races	started in 1966	(Spain) Antonio Gelabert	longer break with no races	(France) Édouard Fachleitner (2/2)	(France) Nello Lauredi (1/3)	(Switzerland) Hugo Koblet (1/4)	1950
1951	(Belgium) Roger Decock	started in 1966	(Italy) Primo Volpi	longer break with no races	(Switzerland) Ferdinand Kübler (4/5)	(France) Nello Lauredi (2/3)	(Switzerland) Ferdinand Kübler (5/5)	1951
1952	(France) Louison Bobet (1/2)	started in 1966	(Spain) Miguel Poblet (1/2)	longer break with no races	(Netherlands) Wout Wagtmans	(France) Jean Dotto (1/2)	(Italy) Pasquale Fornara (1/5)	1952
1953	(France) Jean-Pierre Munch	started in 1966	(Spain) Salvador Botella (1/2)	longer break with no races	(Switzerland) Hugo Koblet (2/4)	(France) Lucien Teisseire	(Switzerland) Hugo Koblet (3/4)	1953
1954	(Belgium) Raymond Impanis (1/2)	started in 1966	(Italy) Walter Serena	longer break with no races	(France) Jean Forestier (1/2)	(France) Nello Lauredi (3/3)	(Italy) Pasquale Fornara (2/5)	1954
1955	(France) Jean Bobet	started in 1966	(Spain) José Gómez del Moral	longer break with no races	(Switzerland) René Strehler	(France) Louison Bobet (2/2)	(Switzerland) Hugo Koblet (4/4)	1955
1956	(Belgium) Fred De Bruyne (1/2)	started in 1966	(Spain) Aniceto Utset	longer break with no races	(Italy) Pasquale Fornara (3/5)	(Belgium) Alex Close	(Switzerland) Rolf Graf	1956
1957	(France) Jacques Anquetil (1/9)	started in 1966	(Spain) Jesús Loroño	longer break with no races	(France) Jean Forestier (2/2)	(France) Marcel Rohrbach	(Italy) Pasquale Fornara (4/5)	1957
1958	(Belgium) Fred De Bruyne (2/2)	started in 1966	(Belgium) Richard Van Genechten	longer break with no races	(France) Gilbert Bauvin	(France) Louis Rostollan (1/3)	(Italy) Pasquale Fornara (5/5)	1958
1959	(France) Jean Graczyk	started in 1966	(Spain) Salvador Botella (2/2)	longer break with no races	(Switzerland) Kurt Gimmi	(France) Henry Anglade	(West Germany) Hans Junkermann (1/2)	1959
1960	(Belgium) Raymond Impanis (2/2)	started in 1966	(Spain) Miguel Poblet (2/2)	longer break with no races	(France) Louis Rostollan (2/3)	(France) Jean Dotto (2/2)	(Switzerland) Alfred Rüegg	1960
1961	(France) Jacques Anquetil (2/9)	started in 1966	(France) Henri Duez	longer break with no races	(France) Louis Rostollan (3/3)	(United Kingdom) Brian Robinson	(Switzerland) Attilio Moresi	1961
1962	(Belgium) Joseph Planckaert	started in 1966	(Spain) Antonio Karmany	longer break with no races	(Italy) Guido De Rosso	(France) Raymond Mastrotto	(West Germany) Hans Junkermann (2/2)	1962
1963	(France) Jacques Anquetil (3/9)	started in 1966	(France) Joseph Novales	longer break with no races	(Belgium) Willy Bocklant	(France) Jacques Anquetil (4/9)	(Italy) Giuseppe Fezzardi	1963
1964	(Netherlands) Jan Janssen	started in 1966	(France) Joseph Carrara	longer break with no races	(Switzerland) Rolf Maurer (1/2)	(Spain) Valentín Uriona	(Switzerland) Rolf Maurer (2/2)	1964
1965	(France) Jacques Anquetil (5/9)	started in 1966	(Spain) Antonio Gómez del Moral	longer break with no races	(Italy) Vittorio Adorni (1/3)	(France) Jacques Anquetil (6/9)	(Italy) Franco Bitossi (1/3)	1965
1966	(France) Jacques Anquetil (7/9)	(Italy) Dino Zandegù	(Netherlands) Arie den Hartog	longer break with no races	(Italy) Gianni Motta (1/3)	(France) Raymond Poulidor (1/4)	(Italy) Ambrogio Portalupi	1966
1967	(United Kingdom) Tom Simpson	(Italy) Franco Bitossi (2/3)	(France) Jacques Anquetil (8/9)	longer break with no races	(Italy) Vittorio Adorni (2/3)	no races	(Italy) Gianni Motta (2/3)	1967
1968	(West Germany) Rolf Wolfshohl	(Italy) Claudio Michelotto	(Belgium) Eddy Merckx (1/7)	longer break with no races	(Belgium) Eddy Merckx (2/7)	no races	(Switzerland) Louis Pfenninger (1/2)	1968
1969	(Belgium) Eddy Merckx (3/7)	(Italy) Carlo Chiappano	(Spain) Mariano Díaz	(France) Jacques Anquetil (9/9)	(Italy) Felice Gimondi	(France) Raymond Poulidor (2/4)	(Italy) Vittorio Adorni (3/3)	1969
1970	(Belgium) Eddy Merckx (4/7)	(Belgium) Antoon Houbrechts	(Italy) Franco Bitossi (3/3)	(Spain) Luis Pedro Santamarina	(Sweden) Gösta Pettersson	(Spain) Luis Ocaña (1/6)	(Italy) Roberto Poggiali	1970
1971	(Belgium) Eddy Merckx (5/7)	(Italy) Italo Zilioli	(Spain) Luis Ocaña (2/6)	(Spain) Luis Ocaña (3/6)	(Italy) Gianni Motta (3/3)	(Belgium) Eddy Merckx (6/7)	(Belgium) Georges Pintens	1971
1972	(France) Raymond Poulidor (3/4)	(Belgium) Roger De Vlaeminck (1/7)	(Italy) Felice Gimondi	(Spain) José Antonio González (1/4)	(France) Bernard Thévenet (1/4)	(Spain) Luis Ocaña (4/6)	(Switzerland) Louis Pfenninger (2/2)	1972
1973	(France) Raymond Poulidor (4/4)	(Belgium) Roger De Vlaeminck (2/7)	(Spain) Domingo Perurena	(Spain) Luis Ocaña (5/6)	(Belgium) Wilfried David	(Spain) Luis Ocaña (6/6)	(Spain) José Manuel Fuente	1973
1974	(Netherlands) Joop Zoetemelk (1/5)	(Belgium) Roger De Vlaeminck (3/7)	(France) Bernard Thévenet (2/4)	(Spain) Miguel María Lasa	(Netherlands) Joop Zoetemelk (2/5)	(France) Alain Santy	(Belgium) Eddy Merckx (7/7)	1974
1975	(Netherlands) Joop Zoetemelk (3/5)	(Belgium) Roger De Vlaeminck (4/7)	(Italy) Fausto Bertoglio	(Spain) José Antonio González (2/4)	(Spain) Francisco Galdós	(France) Bernard Thévenet (3/4)	(Belgium) Roger De Vlaeminck (5/7)	1975
1976	(France) Michel Laurent	(Belgium) Roger De Vlaeminck (6/7)	(Spain) Enrique Martínez	(Italy) Gianbattista Baronchelli	(Belgium) Johan De Muynck	(France) Bernard Thévenet (4/4)	(Netherlands) Hennie Kuiper	1976
1977	(Belgium) Freddy Maertens (1/2)	(Belgium) Roger De Vlaeminck (7/7)	(Belgium) Freddy Maertens (2/2)	(Spain) José Antonio González (3/4)	(Italy) Gianbattista Baronchelli	(France) Bernard Hinault (1/4)	(Belgium) Michel Pollentier (1/2)	1977
1978	(Netherlands) Gerrie Knetemann	(Italy) Giuseppe Saronni (1/4)	(Italy) Francesco Moser (1/3)	(Spain) José Antonio González (4/4)	(Netherlands) Johan van der Velde (1/2)	(Belgium) Michel Pollentier (2/2)	(Belgium) Paul Wellens	1978
1979	(Netherlands) Joop Zoetemelk (4/5)	(Norway) Knut Knudsen	(Spain) Vicente Belda	(Italy) Giovanni Battaglin	(Italy) Giuseppe Saronni (2/4)	(France) Bernard Hinault (2/4)	(Belgium) Wilfried Wesemael	1979
1980	(France) Gilbert Duclos-Lassalle	(Italy) Francesco Moser (2/3)	(Spain) Marino Lejarreta	(Spain) Alberto Fernández (1/2)	(France) Bernard Hinault (3/4)	(Netherlands) Johan van der Velde (2/2)	(Italy) Mario Beccia	1980
1981	(Republic of Ireland) Stephen Roche (1/5)	(Italy) Francesco Moser (3/3)	(Spain) Faustino Rupérez	(Italy) Silvano Contini	(Sweden) Tommy Prim (1/2)	(France) Bernard Hinault (4/4)	(Switzerland) Beat Breu (1/2)	1981
1982	(Republic of Ireland) Sean Kelly (1/14)	(Italy) Giuseppe Saronni (3/4)	(Spain) Alberto Fernández (2/2)	(Spain) José Luis Laguía	(Norway) Jostein Wilmann	(France) Michel Laurent	(Italy) Giuseppe Saronni (4/4)	1982
1983	(Republic of Ireland) Sean Kelly (2/14)	(Italy) Roberto Visentini	(Spain) José Recio	(Spain) Julián Gorospe (1/2)	(Republic of Ireland) Stephen Roche (2/5)	(United States) Greg LeMond	(Republic of Ireland) Sean Kelly (3/14)	1983
1984	(Republic of Ireland) Sean Kelly (4/14)	(Sweden) Tommy Prim (2/2)	(Republic of Ireland) Sean Kelly (5/14)	(Republic of Ireland) Sean Kelly (6/14)	(Republic of Ireland) Stephen Roche (3/5)	(Colombia) Martín Ramírez	(Switzerland) Urs Zimmermann (1/2)	1984
1985	(Republic of Ireland) Sean Kelly (7/14)	(Netherlands) Joop Zoetemelk (5/5)	(United Kingdom) Robert Millar (1/2)	(Spain) Pello Ruiz Cabestany	(Switzerland) Jörg Müller	(Australia) Phil Anderson (1/3)	(Australia) Phil Anderson (2/3)	1985
1986	(Republic of Ireland) Sean Kelly (8/14)	(Italy) Luciano Rabottini	(Republic of Ireland) Sean Kelly (9/14)	(Republic of Ireland) Sean Kelly (10/14)	(Belgium) Claude Criquielion	(Switzerland) Urs Zimmermann (2/2)	(United States) Andrew Hampsten (1/3)	1986
1987	(Republic of Ireland) Sean Kelly (11/14)	(Denmark) Rolf Sørensen (1/2)	(Spain) Álvaro Pino	(Republic of Ireland) Sean Kelly (12/14)	(Republic of Ireland) Stephen Roche (4/5)	(France) Charly Mottet (1/4)	(United States) Andrew Hampsten (2/3)	1987
1988	(Republic of Ireland) Sean Kelly (13/14)	(Switzerland) Erich Mächler	(Spain) Miguel Induráin (1/7)	(Netherlands) Erik Breukink	(Netherlands) Gerard Veldscholten	(Colombia) Luis Herrera (1/2)	(Austria) Helmut Wechselberger	1988
1989	(Spain) Miguel Induráin (2/7)	(Switzerland) Tony Rominger (1/9)	(Spain) Marino Lejarreta	(Republic of Ireland) Stephen Roche (5/5)	(Australia) Phil Anderson (3/3)	(France) Charly Mottet (2/4)	(Switzerland) Beat Breu (2/2)	1989
1990	(Spain) Miguel Induráin (3/7)	(Switzerland) Tony Rominger (2/9)	(Spain) Laudelino Cubino	(Spain) Julián Gorospe (2/2)	(France) Charly Mottet (3/4)	(United Kingdom) Robert Millar (2/2)	(Republic of Ireland) Sean Kelly (14/14)	1990
1991	(Switzerland) Tony Rominger (3/9)	(Spain) Herminio Díaz Zabala	(Spain) Miguel Induráin (4/7)	(Italy) Claudio Chiappucci (1/2)	(Switzerland) Tony Rominger (4/9)	(Colombia) Luis Herrera (2/2)	(Belgium) Luc Roosen	1991
1992	(France) Jean-François Bernard	(Denmark) Rolf Sørensen (2/2)	(Spain) Miguel Induráin (5/7)	(Switzerland) Tony Rominger (5/9)	(United States) Andrew Hampsten (3/3)	(France) Charly Mottet (4/4)	(Italy) Giorgio Furlan (1/2)	1992
1993	(Switzerland) Alex Zülle (1/5)	(Italy) Maurizio Fondriest	(Colombia) Álvaro Mejía	(Switzerland) Tony Rominger (6/9)	(Switzerland) Pascal Richard (1/3)	(Switzerland) Laurent Dufaux (1/3)	(Italy) Marco Saligari	1993
1994	(Switzerland) Toni Rominger (7/9)	(Italy) Giorgio Furlan (2/2)	(Italy) Claudio Chiappucci (2/2)	(Switzerland) Tony Rominger (8/9)	(Switzerland) Pascal Richard (2/3)	(Switzerland) Laurent Dufaux (2/3)	(Switzerland) Pascal Richard (3/3)	1994
1995	(France) Laurent Jalabert (1/6)	(Italy) Stefano Colagè	(France) Laurent Jalabert (2/6)	(Switzerland) Alex Zülle (2/5)	(Switzerland) Tony Rominger (9/9)	(Spain) Miguel Induráin (6/7)	(Russia) Pavel Tonkov (1/2)	1995
1996	(France) Laurent Jalabert (3/6)	(Italy) F. Casagrande (1/3)	(Switzerland) Alex Zülle (3/5)	(Italy) F. Casagrande (2/3)	(Spain) Abraham Olano	(Spain) Miguel Induráin (7/7)	(Austria) Peter Luttenberger	1996
1997	(France) Laurent Jalabert (4/6)	(Italy) Roberto Petito	(Spain) Fernando Escartín	(Switzerland) Alex Zülle (4/5)	(Russia) Pavel Tonkov (2/2)	(Germany) Udo Bölts	(France) Christophe Agnolutto	1997
1998	(Belgium) Frank Vandenbroucke	(Switzerland) Rolf Järmann	(Colombia) Hernán Buenahora	(Spain) Íñigo Cuesta	(Switzerland) Laurent Dufaux (3/3)	(France) Armand de Las Cuevas	(Italy) Stefano Garzelli	1998
1999	(Netherlands) Michael Boogerd	(Italy) Michele Bartoli	(Spain) Manuel Beltrán	(France) Laurent Jalabert (5/6)	(France) Laurent Jalabert (6/6)	(Kazakhstan) Alexander Vinokourov (1/4)	(Italy) F. Casagrande (3/3)	1999
2000	(Germany) Andreas Klöden (1/5)	(Spain) Abraham Olano	(Spain) José María Jiménez	(Germany) Andreas Klöden (2/5)	(Italy) Paolo Savoldelli	(United States) Tyler Hamilton (1/3)	(Switzerland) Oscar Camenzind	2000
2001	(Italy) Dario Frigo (1/3)	(Italy) Davide Rebellin (1/2)	(Spain) Joseba Beloki	(Lithuania) Raimondas Rumšas	(Italy) Dario Frigo (2/3)	(France) Christophe Moreau	(Italy) Gilberto Simoni (Note: In 2012, to Lance Armstrong was taken away his Tour de Suisse 2001 win, due to doping and given to Gilberto Simoni.)	2001
2002	(Kazakhstan) Alexander Vinokourov (2/4)	(Netherlands) Erik Dekker	(Spain) Roberto Heras	(Spain) Aitor Osa	(Italy) Dario Frigo (3/3)	Result void (Note: In 2012, to Lance Armstrong was subsequently taken away his Critérium du Dauphiné win from 2002, due to doping. First placed stayed empty.)	(Switzerland) Alex Zülle (5/5)	2002
2003	(Kazakhstan) Alexander Vinokourov (3/4)	(Italy) Filippo Pozzato	(Spain) José A. Pecharromán	(Spain) Iban Mayo (1/2)	(United States) Tyler Hamilton (2/3)	Result void (Note: In 2012, to Lance Armstrong was subsequently taken away his Critérium du Dauphiné win from 2003, due to doping. First placed stayed empty.)	(Kazakhstan) Alexander Vinokourov (4/4)	2003
2004	(Germany) Jörg Jaksche	(Italy) Paolo Bettini	(Spain) M. A. Martín Perdiguero	(Russia) Denis Menchov	(United States) Tyler Hamilton (3/3)	(Spain) Iban Mayo (2/2)	(Germany) Jan Ullrich	2004
2005	(United States) Bobby Julich	(Spain) Óscar Freire	(Ukraine) Yaroslav Popovych	(Italy) Danilo Di Luca	(Colombia) Santiago Botero	(Spain) Iñigo Landaluze	(Spain) Aitor González	2005
2006	(United States) Floyd Landis	(Netherlands) Thomas Dekker (1/2)	(Spain) David Cañada	(Spain) J.A. Gómez Marchante	(Australia) Cadel Evans (1/3)	Result void (Note: In 2012, to Lance Armstrong was subsequently taken away his Critérium du Dauphiné win from 2006, due to doping. First placed stayed empty.)	(Spain) Koldo Gil (Note: In 2012, to Jan Ullrich was subsequently taken away his Tour de Suisse win from 2006 and given to Koldo Gil.)	2006
2007	(Spain) Alberto Contador (1/7)	(Germany) Andreas Klöden (3/5)	(Russia) Vladimir Karpets	(Spain) Juan José Cobo	(Netherlands) Thomas Dekker (2/2)	(France) Christophe Moreau	(Russia) Vladimir Karpets	2007
2008	(Italy) Davide Rebellin (2/2)	(Switzerland) Fabian Cancellara	(Spain) Gustavo César	(Spain) Alberto Contador (2/7)	(Germany) Andreas Klöden (4/5)	(Spain) Alejandro Valverde (1/6)	(Czech Republic) Roman Kreuziger (1/2)	2008
2009	(Spain) Luis León Sánchez	(Italy) Michele Scarponi (1/2)	(Spain) Alejandro Valverde (2/6)	(Spain) Alberto Contador (3/7)	(Czech Republic) Roman Kreuziger (2/2)	(Spain) Alejandro Valverde (3/6)	(Switzerland) Fabian Cancellara	2009
2010	(Spain) Alberto Contador (4/7)	(Italy) Stefano Garzelli	(Spain) Joaquim Rodríguez (1/3)	(United States) Chris Horner	(Slovenia) Simon Špilak (1/3)	(Slovenia) Janez Brajkovič	(Luxembourg) Fränk Schleck	2010
2011	(Germany) Tony Martin	(Australia) Cadel Evans (2/3)	(Italy) Michele Scarponi (2/2) (Note: In 2012, to Alberto Contador was subsequently taken away his Volta a Catalunya win from 2011 and given to Michele Scarponi.)	(Germany) Andreas Klöden (5/5)	(Australia) Cadel Evans (3/3)	(United Kingdom) Bradley Wiggins (1/4)	(United States) Levi Leipheimer	2011
2012	(United Kingdom) Bradley Wiggins (2/4)	(Italy) Vincenzo Nibali (1/2)	(Switzerland) Michael Albasini	(Spain) Samuel Sánchez	(United Kingdom) Bradley Wiggins (3/4)	(United Kingdom) Bradley Wiggins (4/4)	(Portugal) Rui Costa (1/3)	2012
2013	(Australia) Richie Porte (1/6)	(Italy) Vincenzo Nibali (2/2)	(Republic of Ireland) Dan Martin	(Colombia) Nairo Quintana (1/5)	(United Kingdom) Chris Froome (1/5)	(United Kingdom) Chris Froome (2/5)	(Portugal) Rui Costa (2/3)	2013
2014	(Colombia) Carlos Betancur	(Spain) Alberto Contador (5/7)	(Spain) Joaquim Rodríguez (2/3)	(Spain) Alberto Contador (6/7)	(United Kingdom) Chris Froome (3/5)	(United States) Andrew Talansky	(Portugal) Rui Costa (3/3)	2014
2015	(Australia) Richie Porte (2/6)	(Colombia) Nairo Quintana (2/5)	(Australia) Richie Porte (3/6)	(Spain) Joaquim Rodríguez (3/3)	(Russia) Ilnur Zakarin	(United Kingdom) Chris Froome (4/5)	(Slovenia) Simon Špilak (2/3)	2015
2016	(United Kingdom) Geraint Thomas (1/4)	(Belgium) Greg Van Avermaet	(Colombia) Nairo Quintana (3/5)	(Spain) Alberto Contador (7/7)	(Colombia) Nairo Quintana (4/5)	(United Kingdom) Chris Froome (5/5)	(Colombia) Miguel Ángel López (1/2)	2016
2017	(Colombia) Sergio Henao	(Colombia) Nairo Quintana (5/5)	(Spain) Alejandro Valverde (4/6)	(Spain) Alejandro Valverde (5/6)	(Australia) Richie Porte (4/6)	(Denmark) Jakob Fuglsang (1/2)	(Slovenia) Simon Špilak (3/3)	2017
2018	(Spain) Marc Soler	(Poland) Michał Kwiatkowski	(Spain) Alejandro Valverde (6/6)	(Slovenia) Primož Roglič (1/11)	(Slovenia) Primož Roglič (2/11)	(United Kingdom) Geraint Thomas (2/4)	(Australia) Richie Porte (5/6)	2018
2019	(Colombia) Egan Bernal (1/2)	(Slovenia) Primož Roglič (3/11)	(Colombia) Miguel Ángel López (2/2)	(Spain) Ion Izagirre	(Slovenia) Primož Roglič (4/11)	(Denmark) Jakob Fuglsang (2/2)	(Colombia) Egan Bernal (2/2)	2019
2020	(Germany) Max Schachmann (1/2)	(United Kingdom) Simon Yates	cancelled due to COVID-19	cancelled due to COVID-19	cancelled due to COVID-19	(Colombia) Daniel Martínez (1/2)	cancelled due to COVID-19	2020
2021	(Germany) Max Schachmann (2/2)	(Slovenia) Tadej Pogačar (1/7)	(United Kingdom) Adam Yates (1/3)	(Slovenia) Primož Roglič (5/11)	(United Kingdom) Geraint Thomas (3/4)	(Australia) Richie Porte (6/6)	(Ecuador) Richard Carapaz	2021
2022	(Slovenia) Primož Roglič (6/11)	(Slovenia) Tadej Pogačar (2/7)	(Colombia) Sergio Higuita	(Colombia) Daniel Martínez (2/2)	Aleksander Vlasov (Note: In 2022 Russian cyclist Aleksandr Vlasov competed and won Tour de Romandie under empty flag due to sanctions against his country.)	(Slovenia) Primož Roglič (7/11)	(United Kingdom) Geraint Thomas (4/4)	2022
2023	(Slovenia) Tadej Pogačar (3/7)	(Slovenia) Primož Roglič (8/11)	(Slovenia) Primož Roglič (9/11)	(Denmark) Jonas Vingegaard (1/5)	(United Kingdom) Adam Yates (2/3)	(Denmark) Jonas Vingegaard (2/5)	(Denmark) Mattias Skjelmose	2023
2024	(United States) Matteo Jorgenson (1/2)	(Denmark) Jonas Vingegaard (3/5)	(Slovenia) Tadej Pogačar (4/7)	(Spain) Juan Ayuso (1/2)	(Spain) Carlos Rodríguez	(Slovenia) Primož Roglič (10/11)	(United Kingdom) Adam Yates (3/3)	2024
2025	(United States) Matteo Jorgenson (2/2)	(Spain) Juan Ayuso (2/2)	(Slovenia) Primož Roglič (11/11)	(Portugal) Joao Almeida (1/3)	(Portugal) Joao Almeida (2/3)	(Slovenia) Tadej Pogačar (5/7)	(Portugal) Joao Almeida (3/3)	2025
2026	(Denmark) Jonas Vingegaard (4/5)	(Mexico) Isaac del Toro (1/2)	(Denmark) Jonas Vingegaard (5/5)	(France) Paul Seixas	(Slovenia) Tadej Pogačar (6/7)	(Mexico) Isaac del Toro (2/2)	(Slovenia) Tadej Pogačar (7/7)	2026
Year	Paris–Nice	Tirreno–Adriatico	Volta a Catalunya	Tour of the Basque Country	Tour de Romandie	Auvergne-Rhône-Alpes	Tour de Suisse	Year

=== Three wins in a single season ===
Rider	Year	Pa–Nice	Tirr–Adr	Catalunya	Basque	Romandie	A-R-A	Suisse
(Republic of Ireland) Sean Kelly	1984	Yes	No	Yes	Yes	No	No	No
(Republic of Ireland) Sean Kelly	1986	Yes	No	Yes	Yes	No	No	No
(United Kingdom) Bradley Wiggins	2012	Yes	No	No	No	Yes	Yes	No
(Portugal) João Almeida	2025	No	No	No	Yes	Yes	No	Yes

== Statistics ==
=== Different wins ===
Rider	Wins	Pa–Nice	Tirr–Adr	Catalunya	Basque	Romandie	A-R-A	Suisse
(Slovenia) Primož Roglič	6	Yes	Yes	Yes	Yes	Yes	Yes	No
(Slovenia) Tadej Pogačar	6	Yes	Yes	Yes	No	Yes	Yes	Yes
(Belgium) Eddy Merckx	5	Yes	No	Yes	No	Yes	Yes	Yes
(Australia) Richie Porte	5	Yes	No	Yes	No	Yes	Yes	Yes
(Denmark) Jonas Vingegaard	5	Yes	Yes	Yes	Yes	No	Yes	No
(France) Jacques Anquetil	4	Yes	No	Yes	Yes	No	Yes	No
(Republic of Ireland) Sean Kelly	4	Yes	No	Yes	Yes	No	No	Yes
(Switzerland) Tony Rominger	4	Yes	Yes	No	Yes	Yes	No	No
(France) Laurent Jalabert	4	Yes	No	Yes	Yes	Yes	No	No
(Switzerland) Alex Zülle	4	Yes	No	Yes	Yes	No	No	Yes
(Germany) Andreas Klöden	4	Yes	Yes	No	Yes	Yes	No	No
(United Kingdom) Geraint Thomas	4	Yes	No	No	No	Yes	Yes	Yes

=== Multiple winners by year ===
Wins	Rider	Editions
14	(Republic of Ireland) Sean Kelly	1982, 1983 (2x), 1984 (3x), 1985, 1986 (3x), 1987 (2x), 1988, 1990
11	(Slovenia) Primož Roglič	2018 (2x), 2019 (2x), 2021, 2022 (2x), 2023 (2x), 2024, 2025
9	(France) Jacques Anquetil	1957, 1961, 1963 (2x), 1965 (2x), 1966, 1967, 1969
9	(Switzerland) Tony Rominger	1989, 1990, 1991 (2x), 1992, 1993, 1994 (2x), 1995
8	(Spain) Mariano Cañardo	1928, 1929, 1930 (2x), 1932, 1935, 1936, 1939
7	(Belgium) Eddy Merckx	1968 (2x), 1969, 1970, 1971 (2x), 1974
7	(Belgium) Roger De Vlaeminck	1972, 1973, 1974, 1975 (2x), 1976, 1977
7	(Spain) Miguel Induráin	1988, 1989, 1990, 1991, 1992, 1995, 1996
7	(Spain) Alberto Contador	2007, 2008, 2009, 2010, 2014 (2x), 2016
7	(Slovenia) Tadej Pogačar	2021, 2022, 2023, 2024, 2025, 2026 (2x)
6	(Spain) Luis Ocaña	1970, 1971 (2x), 1972, 1973 (2x)
6	(France) Laurent Jalabert	1995 (2x), 1996, 1997, 1999 (2x)
6	(Australia) Richie Porte	2013, 2015 (2x), 2017, 2018, 2021
6	(Spain) Alejandro Valverde	2008, 2009 (2x), 2017 (2x), 2018
5	(Switzerland) Ferdinand Kübler	1942, 1948 (2x), 1951 (2x)
5	(Italy) Pasquale Fornara	1952, 1954, 1956, 1957, 1958
5	(Netherlands) Joop Zoetemelk	1974 (2x), 1975, 1979, 1985
5	(Republic of Ireland) Stephen Roche	1981, 1983, 1984, 1987, 1989
5	(Switzerland) Alex Zülle	1993, 1995, 1996, 1997, 2002
5	(Germany) Andreas Klöden	2000 (2x), 2007, 2008, 2011
5	(United Kingdom) Chris Froome	2013 (2x), 2014, 2015, 2016
5	(Colombia) Nairo Quintana	2013, 2015, 2016 (2x), 2017
5	(Denmark) Jonas Vingegaard	2023 (2x), 2024, 2026 (2x)
4	(Italy) (Italy) Gino Bartali	1935, 1946, 1947, 1949
4	(Switzerland) Hugo Koblet	1950, 1953 (2x), 1955
4	(France) Raymond Poulidor	1966, 1969, 1972, 1973
4	(France) Bernard Thévenet	1972, 1974, 1975, 1976
4	(Spain) José Antonio González	1972, 1975, 1977, 1978
4	(France) Bernard Hinault	1977, 1979, 1980, 1981
4	(Italy) Giuseppe Saronni	1978, 1979, 1982 (2x)
4	(France) Charly Mottet	1987, 1989, 1990, 1992
4	(Kazakhstan) Alexander Vinokourov	1999, 2002, 2003 (2x)
4	(United Kingdom) Bradley Wiggins	2011, 2012 (3x)
4	(United Kingdom) Geraint Thomas	2016, 2018, 2021, 2022
3	(France) Nello Lauredi	1950, 1951, 1954
3	(France) Louis Rostollan	1958, 1960, 1961
3	(Italy) Vittorio Adorni	1965, 1967, 1969
3	(Italy) Franco Bitossi	1965, 1967, 1970
3	(Italy) Gianni Motta	1966, 1967, 1971
3	(Italy) Francesco Moser	1978, 1980, 1981
3	(Australia) Phil Anderson	1985 (2x), 1989
3	(United States) Andrew Hampsten	1986, 1987, 1992
3	(Switzerland) Pascal Richard	1993, 1994 (2x)
3	(Switzerland) Laurent Dufaux	1993, 1994, 1998
3	(United States) Tyler Hamilton	2000, 2003, 2004
3	(Italy) Dario Frigo	2001 (2x), 2002
3	(Australia) Cadel Evans	2006, 2011 (2x)
3	(Spain) Joaquim Rodríguez	2010, 2014, 2015
3	(Slovenia) Simon Špilak	2010, 2015, 2017
3	(Portugal) Rui Costa	2012, 2013, 2014
3	(United Kingdom) Adam Yates	2021, 2023, 2024
3	(Portugal) Joao Almeida	2025 (3x)
2	(Spain) Mució Miquel	1924, 1925
2	(Belgium) Maurice De Waele	1928, 1929
2	(France) Maurice Archambaud	1936, 1939
2	(Spain) (Spain) Julián Berrendero	1943, 1946
2	(Spain) Emilio Rodríguez	1947, 1948
2	(France) Édouard Fachleitner	1948, 1950
2	(France) Louison Bobet	1952, 1955
2	(Spain) Miguel Poblet	1952, 1960
2	(France) Jean Dotto	1952, 1960
2	(Spain) Salvador Botella	1953, 1959
2	(Belgium) Raymond Impanis	1954, 1960
2	(Belgium) Fred De Bruyne	1956, 1958
2	(West Germany) Hans Junkermann	1959, 1962
2	(Switzerland) Rolf Maurer	1964 (2x)
2	(Switzerland) Louis Pfenninger	1968, 1972
2	(Belgium) Freddy Maertens	1977 (2x)
2	(Belgium) Michel Pollentier	1977, 1978
2	(Netherlands) Johan van der Velde	1978, 1980
2	(Spain) Alberto Fernández	1980, 1982
2	(Sweden) Tommy Prim	1981, 1984
2	(Switzerland) Beat Breu	1981, 1989
2	(Spain) Julián Gorospe	1983, 1990
2	(Switzerland) Urs Zimmermann	1984, 1986
2	(United Kingdom) Robert Millar	1985, 1990
2	(Denmark) Rolf Sørensen	1987, 1992
2	(Colombia) Luis Herrera	1988, 1991
2	(Italy) Claudio Chiappucci	1991, 1994
2	(Italy) Giorgio Furlan	1992, 1994
2	(Russia) Pavel Tonkov	1995, 1997
2	(Italy) Davide Rebellin	2001, 2008
2	(Spain) Iban Mayo	2003, 2004
2	(Netherlands) Thomas Dekker	2006, 2007
2	(Czech Republic) Roman Kreuziger	2008, 2009
2	(Italy) Michele Scarponi	2009, 2011
2	(Colombia) Miguel Ángel López	2016, 2019
2	(Denmark) Jakob Fuglsang	2017, 2019
2	(Colombia) Egan Bernal	2019 (2x)
2	(Germany) Max Schachmann	2020, 2021
2	(Colombia) Daniel Martínez	2020, 2022
2	(United States) Matteo Jorgenson	2024, 2025
2	(Spain) Juan Ayuso	2024, 2025
2	(Mexico) Isaac del Toro	2026 (2x)

=== Multiply winners by race ===
Legend
^{†}	Rider won all seven major one week stage races
^{‡}	Rider won six different major one week stage races
X (bold)	Record number of wins for a single major one week stage race
Rider (bold)	Rider is active

#	Cyclist	First	Last	Pa–Ni	Ti–Ad	Catal	Basq	Roman	ARA	Suisse	Total
1	(Republic of Ireland) Sean Kelly	1982	1990	7	—	2	3	—	—	2	14
2	(Slovenia) Primož Roglič^{‡}	2018	2025	1	2	2	2	2	2	—	11
3	(France) Jacques Anquetil	1957	1969	5	—	1	1	—	2	—	9
3	(Switzerland) Tony Rominger	1989	1995	2	2	—	3	2	—	—	9
5	(Spain) Mariano Cañardo	1928	1939	—	—	7	1	—	—	—	8
6	(Belgium) Eddy Merckx	1968	1974	3	—	1	—	1	1	1	7
6	(Belgium) Roger De Vlaeminck	1972	1977	—	6	—	—	—	—	1	7
6	(Spain) Miguel Induráin	1988	1996	2	—	3	—	—	2	—	7
6	(Spain) Alberto Contador	2007	2016	2	1	—	4	—	—	—	7
6	(Slovenia) Tadej Pogačar^{‡}	2021	2026	1	2	1	—	1	1	1	7
11	(Spain) Luis Ocaña	1970	1973	—	—	1	2	—	3	—	6
11	(France) Laurent Jalabert	1995	1999	3	—	1	1	1	—	—	6
11	(Australia) Richie Porte	2013	2021	2	—	1	—	1	1	1	6
11	(Spain) Alejandro Valverde	2008	2018	—	—	3	1	—	2	—	6
15	(Switzerland) Ferdinand Kübler	1942	1951	—	—	—	—	2	—	3	5
15	(Italy) Pasquale Fornara	1952	1958	—	—	—	—	1	—	4	5
15	(Netherlands) Joop Zoetemelk	1974	1985	3	1	—	—	1	—	—	5
15	(Republic of Ireland) Stephen Roche	1981	1987	1	—	—	1	3	—	—	5
15	(Switzerland) Alex Zülle	1993	2002	1	—	1	2	—	—	1	5
15	(Germany) Andreas Klöden	2000	2011	1	1	—	2	1	—	—	5
15	(United Kingdom) Chris Froome	2013	2016	—	—	—	—	2	3	—	5
15	(Colombia) Nairo Quintana	2013	2017	—	2	1	1	1	—	—	5
15	(Denmark) Jonas Vingegaard	2023	2026	1	1	1	1	—	1	—	5
24	(Italy) Gino Bartali	1935	1949	—	—	—	1	1	—	2	4
24	(Switzerland) Hugo Koblet	1950	1955	—	—	—	—	1	—	3	4
24	(France) Raymond Poulidor	1966	1973	2	—	—	—	—	2	—	4
24	(France) Bernard Thévenet	1972	1976	—	—	1	—	1	2	—	4
24	(Spain) José Antonio González	1972	1978	—	—	—	4	—	—	—	4
24	(France) Bernard Hinault	1977	1981	—	—	—	—	1	3	—	4
24	(Italy) Giuseppe Saronni	1978	1982	—	2	—	—	1	—	1	4
24	(France) Charly Mottet	1987	1992	—	—	—	—	1	3	—	4
24	(Kazakhstan) Alexander Vinokourov	1999	2003	2	—	—	—	—	1	1	4
24	(United Kingdom) Bradley Wiggins	2011	2012	1	—	—	—	1	2	—	4
24	(United Kingdom) Geraint Thomas	2016	2022	1	—	—	—	1	1	1	4
35	(France) Nello Lauredi	1950	1954	—	—	—	—	—	3	—	3
35	(France) Louis Rostollan	1958	1961	—	—	—	—	2	1	—	3
35	(Italy) Vittorio Adorni	1965	1969	—	—	—	—	2	—	1	3
35	(Italy) Franco Bitossi	1965	1970	—	1	1	—	—	—	1	3
35	(Italy) Gianni Motta	1966	1971	—	—	—	—	2	—	1	3
35	(Italy) Francesco Moser	1978	1981	—	2	1	—	—	—	—	3
35	(Australia) Phil Anderson	1985	1989	—	—	—	—	1	1	1	3
35	(United States) Andrew Hampsten	1986	1992	—	—	—	—	1	—	2	3
35	(Switzerland) Pascal Richard	1993	1994	—	—	—	—	2	—	1	3
35	(Switzerland) Laurent Dufaux	1993	1998	—	—	—	—	1	2	—	3
35	(United States) Tyler Hamilton	2000	2004	—	—	—	—	2	1	—	3
35	(Italy) Dario Frigo	2001	2002	1	—	—	—	2	—	—	3
35	(Australia) Cadel Evans	2006	2011	—	1	—	—	2	—	—	3
35	(Spain) Joaquim Rodríguez	2010	2015	—	—	2	1	—	—	—	3
35	(Slovenia) Simon Špilak	2010	2017	—	—	—	—	1	—	2	3
35	(Portugal) Rui Costa	2012	2014	—	—	—	—	—	—	3	3
35	(United Kingdom) Adam Yates	2021	2024	—	—	1	—	1	—	1	3
35	(Portugal) Joao Almeida	2025	2025	—	—	—	1	1	—	1	3

=== Wins by country ===
Wins	Country
115	Spain
79	France
77	Italy
53	Switzerland
45	Belgium
22	Slovenia
21	Great Britain
20	Ireland
20	Colombia
18	Netherlands
14	United States
12	Australia
11	Germany
10	Denmark
6	Russia
6	Portugal
4	Kazakhstan
3	West Germany
3	Austria
3	Sweden
3	Luxembourg
3	no winners (Note: Critérium du Dauphiné race didn't have winners for 3-times as being taken away from Lance Armstrong due to doping and left three empty spots.)
2	Poland
2	Norway
2	Czech Republic
2	Mexico
1	(Germany) Third Reich
1	Ukraine
1	Lithuania
1	Ecuador
1	win without flag
