= 1963 Tour de Suisse =

Race details
- Dates: 13–19 June 1963
- Stages: 7
- Distance: 1,237 km (768.6 mi)
- Winning time: 35h 20' 49"

Results
	Winner	Giuseppe Fezzardi (ITA)	(Cynar–Frejus)
	Second	Rolf Maurer (SUI)	(Cynar–Frejus)
	Third	Attilio Moresi (SUI)	(Cynar–Frejus)
	Points	Rolf Maurer (SUI)	(Cynar–Frejus)
	Mountains	Rolf Maurer (SUI)	(Cynar–Frejus)
	Team	Cynar–Frejus	

The 1963 Tour de Suisse was the 27th edition of the Tour de Suisse cycle race and was held from 13 June to 19 June 1963. The race started in Zürich and finished in Bremgarten. The race was won by Giuseppe Fezzardi of the Cynar team.

== General classification ==
Final general classification

Rank	Rider	Team	Time
1	Giuseppe Fezzardi (ITA)	Cynar–Frejus	35h 20' 49"
2	Rolf Maurer (SUI)	Cynar–Frejus	+ 3' 34"
3	Attilio Moresi (SUI)	Cynar–Frejus	+ 4' 09"
4	Kurt Gimmi (SUI)	Carpano	+ 4' 21"
5	Ernesto Bono (ITA)	San Pellegrino	+ 4' 40"
6	Italo Zilioli (ITA)	Carpano	+ 8' 36"
7	Robert Hagmann (SUI)	Tigra	+ 11' 05"
8	Alberto Marzaioli (ITA)	San Pellegrino	+ 11' 24"
9	Klaus Bugdahl (FRG)	Torpedo	+ 11' 31"
10	José Martín Colmenarejo (ESP)	Flandria–Faema	+ 12' 04"
