= 1964 Tour de Suisse =

Race details
- Dates: 11–17 June 1964
- Stages: 7
- Distance: 1,264 km (785.4 mi)
- Winning time: 34h 30' 25"

Results
	Winner	Rolf Maurer (SUI)	(Cynar–Frejus)
	Second	Franco Balmamion (ITA)	(Cynar–Frejus)
	Third	Italo Zilioli (ITA)	(Carpano)
	Points	Rolf Maurer (SUI)	(Cynar–Frejus)
	Mountains	Rolf Maurer (SUI)	(Cynar–Frejus)
	Team	Cynar–Frejus	

The 1964 Tour de Suisse was the 28th edition of the Tour de Suisse cycle race and was held from 11 June to 17 June 1964. The race started in Murten and finished in Lausanne. The race was won by Rolf Maurer of the Cynar team.

== General classification ==
Final general classification

Rank	Rider	Team	Time
1	Rolf Maurer (SUI)	Cynar–Frejus	34h 30' 25"
2	Franco Balmamion (ITA)	Cynar–Frejus	+ 1' 58"
3	Italo Zilioli (ITA)	Carpano	+ 4' 01"
4	Werner Weber (SUI)	Cynar–Frejus	+ 7' 40"
5	José Martín Colmenarejo (ESP)	Inuri	+ 10' 07"
6	Antonio Gómez del Moral (ESP)	Ignis	+ 12' 36"
7	René Binggeli (SUI)	Tigra	+ 13' 19"
8	Germano Barale (ITA)	Carpano	+ 13' 32"
9	Robert Hagmann (FRG)	Tigra	+ 15' 07"
10	Huub Zilverberg (NED)	Flandria–Romeo	+ 17' 09"
