= 1962 Tour de Suisse =

Race details
- Dates: 14–20 June 1962
- Stages: 7
- Distance: 1,273 km (791.0 mi)
- Winning time: 36h 33' 00"

Results
	Winner	Hans Junkermann (FRG)	(Torpedo)
	Second	Franco Balmamion (ITA)	(Carpano)
	Third	Aldo Moser (ITA)	(San Pellegrino)
	Points	Hans Junkermann (FRG)	(Torpedo)
	Mountains	Hans Junkermann (FRG)	(Torpedo)
	Team	Carpano	

The 1962 Tour de Suisse was the 26th edition of the Tour de Suisse cycle race and was held from 14 June to 20 June 1962. The race started and finished in Zürich. The race was won by Hans Junkermann of the Torpedo team.

== General classification ==
Final general classification

Rank	Rider	Team	Time
1	Hans Junkermann (FRG)	Torpedo	36h 33' 00"
2	Franco Balmamion (ITA)	Carpano	+ 1' 02"
3	Aldo Moser (ITA)	San Pellegrino	+ 4' 57"
4	Gilbert Desmet (BEL)	Carpano	+ 6' 15"
5	Juan Campillo (ESP)	Margnat–Paloma–D'Alessandro	+ 12' 15"
6	Jan Hugens (NED)	Locomotief	+ 12' 42"
7	Rolf Graf (ITA)	Tigra	+ 14' 40"
8	Giuseppe Fezzardi (ITA)	San Pellegrino	+ 15' 41"
9	Kurt Gimmi (SUI)	Carpano	+ 17' 37"
10	Rolf Maurer (SUI)	Afri-Cola	+ 18' 44"
