= 1959 Tour de Romandie =

Race details
- Dates: 7–10 May 1959
- Stages: 4
- Distance: 825.4 km (512.9 mi)
- Winning time: 23h 01' 02"

Results
	Winner	Kurt Gimmi (SUI)
	Second	Rolf Graf (SUI)
	Third	Alfred Rüegg (SUI)

The 1959 Tour de Romandie was the 13th edition of the Tour de Romandie cycle race and was held from 7 May to 10 May 1959. The race started and finished in Fribourg. The race was won by Kurt Gimmi.

== General classification ==
Final general classification
Rank	Rider	Time
1	Kurt Gimmi (SUI)	23h 01' 02"
2	Rolf Graf (SUI)	+ 26"
3	Alfred Rüegg (SUI)	+ 1' 00"
4	Angelo Conterno (ITA)	+ 1' 33"
5	René Privat (FRA)	+ 1' 34"
6	Antonio Ricco (ITA)	+ 5' 19"
7	Albert Bouvet (FRA)	+ 8' 07"
8	Agostino Coletto (ITA)	+ 9' 03"
9	Jean-Claude Grèt (SUI)	+ 10' 16"
10	André Dupré (FRA)	+ 10' 20"
