= 1960 Tour de Suisse =

Race details
- Dates: 16–22 June 1960
- Stages: 7
- Distance: 1,278 km (794.1 mi)
- Winning time: 35h 54' 33"

Results
	Winner	Alfred Rüegg (SUI)	(Liberia–Grammont)
	Second	Kurt Gimmi (SUI)	(Carpano)
	Third	René Strehler (SUI)	(Wiel's–Flandria)
	Points	Kurt Gimmi (SUI)	(Carpano)
	Mountains	Alfred Rüegg (SUI)	(Liberia–Grammont)

The 1960 Tour de Suisse was the 24th edition of the Tour de Suisse cycle race and was held from 16 June to 22 June 1960. The race started in Zürich and finished in Basel. The race was won by Alfred Rüegg of the Liberia team.

== General classification ==
Final general classification

Rank	Rider	Team	Time
1	Alfred Rüegg (SUI)	Liberia–Grammont	35h 54' 33"
2	Kurt Gimmi (SUI)	Carpano	+ 2' 37"
3	René Strehler (SUI)	Wiel's–Flandria	+ 2' 53"
4	Attilio Moresi (SUI)	Mondia	+ 3' 22"
5	Victor Sutton (GBR)	Liberia–Grammont	+ 3' 47"
6	Giuseppe Dante (ITA)	Ignis	+ 4' 09"
7	Erwin Lutz (SUI)	Tigra	+ 4' 10"
8	Jef Lahaye (NED)	Eroba–Vredestein	+ 4' 53"
9	Stefano Gaggero (ITA)	Carpano	+ 5' 22"
10	Jean Selic (FRA)	Liberia–Grammont	+ 8' 40"
