= 1968 Tour de Suisse =

Race details
- Dates: 14–22 June 1968
- Stages: 9
- Distance: 1,376 km (855.0 mi)
- Winning time: 37h 01' 10"

Results
| | Winner | Louis Pfenninger (SUI) | (Zimba–Mondia) |
| | Second | Robert Hagmann (SUI) | (Frimatic–Wolber–de Gribaldy) |
| | Third | Herman Van Springel (BEL) | (Dr. Mann–Grundig) |
| | Points | Daniel Van Ryckeghem (BEL) | (Dr. Mann–Grundig) |
| | Mountains | Derek Harrison (GBR) | (Frimatic–Wolber–de Gribaldy) |
| | Team | Dr. Mann–Grundig | |

The 1968 Tour de Suisse was the 32nd edition of the Tour de Suisse cycle race and was held from 14 June to 22 June 1968. The race started and finished in Zürich. The race was won by Louis Pfenninger of the Zimba–Mondia team.

== General classification ==
Final general classification

| Rank | Rider | Team | Time |
|---|---|---|---|
| 1 | Louis Pfenninger (SUI) | Zimba–Mondia | 37h 01' 10" |
| 2 | Robert Hagmann (SUI) | Frimatic–Wolber–de Gribaldy | + 31" |
| 3 | Herman Van Springel (BEL) | Dr. Mann–Grundig | + 56" |
| 4 | Luis Otaño (ESP) | Fagor–Fargas | + 4' 28" |
| 5 | Aurelio González (ESP) | Kas–Kaskol | + 11' 15" |
| 6 | Antoine Houbrechts (BEL) | Flandria–De Clerck | + 11' 20" |
| 7 | José Pérez Francés (ESP) | Kas–Kaskol | + 12' 56" |
| 8 | Raymond Poulidor (FRA) | Mercier–BP–Hutchinson | + 13' 35" |
| 9 | Rolf Maurer (SUI) | Zimba–Mondia | + 14' 37" |
| 10 | Karl-Heinz Kunde (FRG) | Batavus–Alcina–Continental | + 14' 52" |
