= Rolf Maurer =

Swiss cyclist (1938–2019)

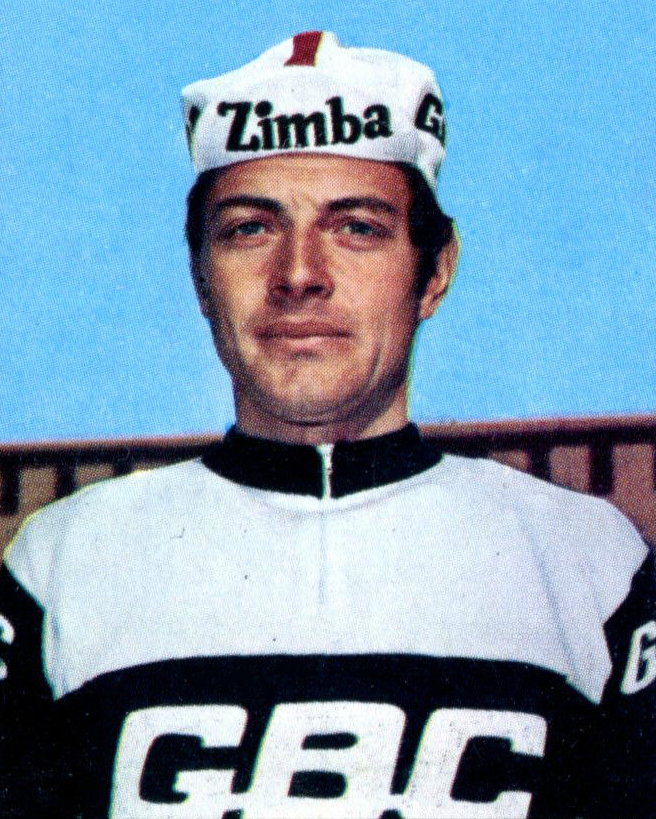
- Maurer c. 1968

Personal information
- Born: 16 April 1938 Hedingen, Switzerland
- Died: 6 June 2019 (aged 81) Hedingen, Switzerland

Cycling career
- Sport: Cycling
- Discipline: Road
- Role: Rider

Professional teams
- 1960–1961: Tigra
- 1961: Margnat–Rochet–Dunlop
- 1962: Liberia–Grammont–Wolber
- 1962: Mittelholzer–Cynar
- 1962: Afri-Cola–Rabeneick
- 1962: Schwab
- 1963–1965: Cynar–Frejus
- 1966: Tigra–Meltina
- 1966–1967: Filotex
- 1968–1969: Zimba–Mondia
- 1968–1969: G.B.C.

Major wins
- Grand Tours Giro d'Italia 1 individual stage (1964) Stage races Tour de Suisse (1964) Tour de Romandie (1964) One-day races and Classics Züri-Metzgete (1961)

Rolf Maurer (16 April 1938 – 6 June 2019) was a Swiss road racing cyclist who competed professionally between 1960 and 1969. In 1964, he won Tour de Suisse and Tour de Romandie.

== Major results ==
1960
5th Tour du Nord-Ouest
1961
1st Züri-Metzgete
1962
2nd Tour du Nord-Ouest
10th Overall Tour de Suisse
1963
1st Stage 4 Tour de Romandie
2nd Overall Tour de Suisse
2nd Overall Tour de l'Avenir

1st Stage 12

3rd Tour du Nord-Ouest
1964
1st Overall Tour de Suisse

1st Stages 2 & 3 (ITT)

1st Overall Tour de Romandie
9th Overall Giro d'Italia

1st Stage 10

10th Züri-Metzgete
1965
2nd Overall Tour de Romandie
3rd Tour des Quatre-Cantons
1966
3rd Overall Tirreno–Adriatico

1st Stage 1

3rd Overall Tour de Romandie
5th Gran Piemonte
6th Overall Tour de Suisse
6th Milan–San Remo
7th Giro di Toscana
10th Overall Giro d'Italia
1967
2nd Overall Tour de Suisse
9th A Travers Lausanne
1968
1st Tour des Quatre-Cantons
6th Milan–San Remo
9th Overall Tour de Suisse

1st Stage 5
