= 1961 Tour de Suisse =

Race details
- Dates: 15–21 June 1961
- Stages: 7
- Distance: 1,357 km (843.2 mi)
- Winning time: 37h 08' 06"

Results
	Winner	Attilio Moresi (SUI)	(Carpano)
	Second	Hilaire Couvreur (BEL)	(Carpano)
	Third	Alfred Rüegg (SUI)	(Mittelholzer)
	Points	Attilio Moresi (SUI)	(Carpano)
	Mountains	Hilaire Couvreur (BEL)	(Carpano)
	Team	Carpano	

The 1961 Tour de Suisse was the 25th edition of the Tour de Suisse cycle race and was held from 15 June to 21 June 1961. The race started in Zürich and finished in Lucerne. The race was won by Attilio Moresi of the Carpano team.

== General classification ==
Final general classification

Rank	Rider	Team	Time
1	Attilio Moresi (SUI)	Carpano	37h 08' 06"
2	Hilaire Couvreur (BEL)	Carpano	+ 4' 10"
3	Alfred Rüegg (SUI)	Mittelholzer	+ 7' 12"
4	Italo Mazzacurati (ITA)	Carpano	+ 9' 10"
5	Germano Barale (ITA)	Carpano	+ 13' 07"
6	Carlo Azzini (ITA)	San Pellegrino	+ 13' 13"
7	Ernesto Bono (ITA)	San Pellegrino	+ 13' 32"
8	Jef Planckaert (BEL)	Wiel's–Flandria	+ 14' 38"
9	Arnaldo di Maria (ITA)	Carpano	+ 20' 21"
10	Kurt Gimmi (SUI)	Carpano	+ 22' 32"
