= 1965 Tour de Romandie =

Race details
- Dates: 6–9 May 1965
- Stages: 4
- Distance: 847 km (526 mi)
- Winning time: 23h 47' 00"

Results
	Winner	Vittorio Adorni (ITA)
	Second	Rolf Maurer (SUI)
	Third	Robert Hagmann (SUI)

The 1965 Tour de Romandie was the 19th edition of the Tour de Romandie cycle race and was held from 6 May to 9 May 1965. The race started in Geneva and finished in Vallorbe. The race was won by Vittorio Adorni.

== General classification ==
Final general classification
Rank	Rider	Time
1	Vittorio Adorni (ITA)	23h 47' 00"
2	Rolf Maurer (SUI)	+ 6"
3	Robert Hagmann (SUI)	+ 34"
4	Felice Gimondi (ITA)	+ 49"
5	Raymond Delisle (FRA)	+ 1' 28"
6	René Binggeli (ITA)	+ 1' 42"
7	Maurice Izier (BEL)	+ 2' 20"
8	Angelino Soler (ESP)	+ 2' 39"
9	Michele Dancelli (ITA)	+ 2' 50"
10	Francis Blanc (SUI)	+ 2' 54"
