= 1967 Tour de Suisse =

Race details
- Dates: 18–23 June 1967
- Stages: 7
- Distance: 1,200 km (745.6 mi)
- Winning time: 31h 26' 41"

Results
	Winner	Gianni Motta (ITA)	(Molteni)
	Second	Rolf Maurer (SUI)	(Filotex)
	Third	Luis Santamarina (ESP)	(Fagor)
	Points	Daniel Van Ryckeghem (BEL)	(Dr. Mann–Grundig)
	Mountains	Gianni Motta (ITA)	(Molteni)
	Team	Molteni	

The 1967 Tour de Suisse was the 31st edition of the Tour de Suisse cycle race and was held from 18 June to 23 June 1967. The race started and finished in Zürich. The race was won by Gianni Motta of the Molteni team.

== General classification ==
Final general classification

Rank	Rider	Team	Time
1	Gianni Motta (ITA)	Molteni	31h 26' 41"
2	Rolf Maurer (SUI)	Filotex	+ 4' 46"
3	Luis Santamarina (ESP)	Fagor	+ 5' 31"
4	José María Errandonea (ESP)	Fagor	+ 8' 44"
5	Hans Junkermann (FRG)	Torpedo	+ 10' 32"
6	Peter Post (NED)	Willem II–Gazelle	+ 10' 43"
7	Giuseppe Fezzardi (ITA)	Molteni	+ 11' 52"
8	Alberto Della Torre (ITA)	Filotex	+ 12' 03"
9	José Manuel López (ESP)	Fagor	+ 12' 22"
10	Daniel Van Ryckeghem (BEL)	Dr. Mann–Grundig	+ 13' 00"
