= 1966 Giro d'Italia =

Cycling race

Race details
- Dates: 18 May - 9 June 1966
- Stages: 22
- Distance: 3,976 km (2,471 mi)
- Winning time: 111h 10' 48"

Results
Jersey awarded to the overall winner	Winner	Gianni Motta (ITA)	(Molteni)
	Second	Italo Zilioli (ITA)	(Sanson)
	Third	Jacques Anquetil (FRA)	(Ford)
	Points	Gianni Motta (ITA)	(Molteni)
	Mountains	Franco Bitossi (ITA)	(Filotex)
	Sprints	Raffaele Marcoli (ITA)	(Sanson)
	Team	Molteni	

The 1966 Giro d'Italia was the 49th running of the Giro d'Italia, one of cycling's Grand Tour races. The Giro started in Monaco's Monte Carlo, on 18 May, with a 149 km (92.6 mi) stage and concluded in Trieste, on 8 June, with a 172 km (106.9 mi) leg. A total of 100 riders from 13 teams entered the 22-stage race, which was won by Italian Gianni Motta of the Molteni team. The second and third places were taken by Italian Italo Zilioli and Frenchman Jacques Anquetil, respectively.

The points classification was introduced in this edition.

== Teams ==
A total of 10 teams were invited to participate in the 1966 Giro d'Italia. Each team sent a squad of ten riders, so the Giro began with a peloton of 100 cyclists. Out of the 100 riders that started this edition of the Giro d'Italia, a total of 83 riders made it to the finish in Trieste.

The 10 teams that took part in the race were:

- Bianchi–Mobylette
- Filotex
- Ford France–Hutchinson (Note: Ford France was also known as G.P. Cynar.)
- Legnano–Pirelli
- Mainetti
- Dr. Mann–Grundig
- Molteni
- Salvarani
- Sanson
- Vittadello

== Route and stages ==
The race route was revealed to the public on 21 February 1966 by race director Vincenzo Torriani. With Monaco hosting the Grande Partenza, it was the second consecutive year, and second time in race history, the race started in a foreign country.

Stage results
Stage	Date	Course	Distance	Type	Winner
1	18 May	Monte Carlo (Monaco) to Diano Marina	149 km (93 mi)	Stage with mountain(s)	Vito Taccone (ITA)
2	19 May	Imperia to Monesi	60 km (37 mi)	Stage with mountain(s)	Julio Jiménez (ESP)
3	20 May	Diano Marina to Genoa	120 km (75 mi)	Plain stage	Severino Andreoli (ITA)
4	21 May	Genoa to Viareggio	241 km (150 mi)	Stage with mountain(s)	Giovanni Knapp (ITA)
5	22 May	Viareggio to Chianciano Terme	222 km (138 mi)	Plain stage	Vendramino Bariviera (ITA)
6	23 May	Chianciano Terme to Rome	226 km (140 mi)	Plain stage	Raffaele Marcoli (ITA)
7	24 May	Rome to Rocca di Cambio	158 km (98 mi)	Stage with mountain(s)	Rudi Altig (GER)
8	25 May	Rocca di Cambio to Naples	238 km (148 mi)	Plain stage	Marino Basso (ITA)
9	26 May	Naples to Campobasso	210 km (130 mi)	Plain stage	Vincent Denson (GBR)
10	27 May	Campobasso to Giulianova	221 km (137 mi)	Plain stage	Dino Zandegù (ITA)
11	28 May	Giulianova to Cesenatico	229 km (142 mi)	Plain stage	Rudi Altig (GER)
12	29 May	Cesenatico to Reggio Emilia	206 km (128 mi)	Plain stage	Dino Zandegù (ITA)
13	30 May	Parma to Parma	46 km (29 mi)	Individual time trial	Vittorio Adorni (ITA)
	31 May	Rest day			
14	1 June	Parma to Arona	267 km (166 mi)	Stage with mountain(s)	Franco Bitossi (ITA)
15	2 June	Arona to Brescia	196 km (122 mi)	Stage with mountain(s)	Julio Jiménez (ESP)
16	3 June	Brescia to Bezzecca	143 km (89 mi)	Stage with mountain(s)	Franco Bitossi (ITA)
17	4 June	Riva del Garda to Levico Terme	239 km (149 mi)	Stage with mountain(s)	Gianni Motta (ITA)
18	5 June	Levico Terme to Bolzano	137 km (85 mi)	Stage with mountain(s)	Michele Dancelli (ITA)
19	6 June	Bolzano to Moena	100 km (62 mi)	Stage with mountain(s)	Gianni Motta (ITA)
20	7 June	Moena to Belluno	215 km (134 mi)	Stage with mountain(s)	Felice Gimondi (ITA)
21	8 June	Belluno to Vittorio Veneto	181 km (112 mi)	Stage with mountain(s)	Pietro Scandelli (ITA)
22	9 June	Vittorio Veneto to Trieste	172 km (107 mi)	Plain stage	Vendramino Bariviera (ITA)
	Total		3,976 km (2,471 mi)		

== Classification leadership ==
One leader's jersey was worn during the 1966 Giro d'Italia. The leader of the general classification – calculated by adding the stage finish times of each rider – wore a pink jersey. This classification is the most important of the race, and its winner is considered as the winner of the Giro. There were no time bonuses in 1966.

For the points classification, which awarded no jersey to its leader, cyclists were given points for finishing a stage in the top 15, with a points system copied from the Tour de France. The classification was also known as the Trofeo Uomo Dreher. There was no jersey associated to this classification yet.

A major secondary classification was the mountains classification. In this ranking, points were won by reaching the summit of a climb ahead of other cyclists. The climbs were ranked in first and second categories.

There was also a classification for intermediate sprints, where riders scored 15, 10 and 5 points at each intermediate sprint.

Although no jersey was awarded, there was also one classification for the teams. Here riders scored points for their teams for a high stage finish, leading the general classification, or begin amongst the first riders at a mountain pass or intermediate sprint.

Classification leadership by stage
Stage	Winner	General classification	Points classification	Mountains classification	Intermediate sprints classification	Team classification
1	Vito Taccone	Vito Taccone	Vito Taccone	not awarded	Ferrucio Manza	Bianchi
2	Julio Jiménez	Julio Jiménez	Felice Gimondi	Julio Jiménez	Ferrucio Manza	Ford France
3	Severino Andreoli	Julio Jiménez	Felice Gimondi	Julio Jiménez	Ferrucio Manza & Severino Andreoli	Ford France
4	Giovanni Knapp	Julio Jiménez	Gianni Motta	Julio Jiménez	Raffaele Marcoli	Vittadello
5	Vendramino Bariviera	Julio Jiménez	Vito Taccone	Julio Jiménez	Raffaele Marcoli	Vittadello
6	Raffaele Marcoli	Julio Jiménez	Vito Taccone	Julio Jiménez	Raffaele Marcoli	Vittadello
7	Rudi Altig	Julio Jiménez	Vito Taccone	Julio Jiménez	Raffaele Marcoli	Molteni
8	Marino Basso	Julio Jiménez	Vito Taccone	Julio Jiménez	Raffaele Marcoli	Molteni
9	Vincent Denson	Julio Jiménez	Gianni Motta	Julio Jiménez	Raffaele Marcoli	Ford France
10	Dino Zandegù	Julio Jiménez	Vito Taccone	Julio Jiménez	Raffaele Marcoli	Ford France
11	Rudi Altig	Julio Jiménez	Rudi Altig	Julio Jiménez	Raffaele Marcoli	Molteni
12	Dino Zandegù	Julio Jiménez	Rudi Altig	Julio Jiménez	Raffaele Marcoli	Molteni
13	Vittorio Adorni	Vittorio Adorni	Rudi Altig	Julio Jiménez	Raffaele Marcoli	Molteni
14	Franco Bitossi	Vittorio Adorni	Rudi Altig	Julio Jiménez	Raffaele Marcoli	Molteni
15	Julio Jiménez	Gianni Motta	Gianni Motta	Julio Jiménez	Raffaele Marcoli	Molteni
16	Franco Bitossi	Gianni Motta	Gianni Motta	Julio Jiménez	Raffaele Marcoli	Molteni
17	Gianni Motta	Gianni Motta	Gianni Motta	Julio Jiménez	Raffaele Marcoli	Molteni
18	Michele Dancelli	Gianni Motta	Gianni Motta	Julio Jiménez	Raffaele Marcoli	Molteni
19	Gianni Motta	Gianni Motta	Gianni Motta	Julio Jiménez	Raffaele Marcoli	Molteni
20	Felice Gimondi	Gianni Motta	Gianni Motta	Franco Bitossi	Raffaele Marcoli	Molteni
21	Pietro Scandelli	Gianni Motta	Gianni Motta	Franco Bitossi	Raffaele Marcoli	Molteni
22	Vendramino Bariviera	Gianni Motta	Gianni Motta	Franco Bitossi	Raffaele Marcoli	Molteni
Final		Gianni Motta	Gianni Motta	Franco Bitossi	Raffaele Marcoli	Molteni

== Final standings ==
Legend
Pink jersey	Denotes the winner of the General classification

=== General classification ===
Final general classification (1–10)
Rank	Name	Team	Time
1	Gianni Motta (ITA)	Molteni	111h 10' 48"
2	Italo Zilioli (ITA)	Sanson	+ 3' 57"
3	Jacques Anquetil (FRA)	Ford France	+ 4' 40"
4	Julio Jiménez (ESP)	Ford France	+ 5' 44"
5	Felice Gimondi (ITA)	Salvarani	+ 6' 47"
6	Franco Balmamion (ITA)	Sanson	+ 7' 27"
7	Vittorio Adorni (ITA)	Salvarani	+ 8' 00"
8	Franco Bitossi (ITA)	Filotex	+ 9' 24"
9	Vito Taccone (ITA)	Vittadello	+ 11' 42"
10	Rolf Maurer (SUI)	Filotex	+ 20' 28"

=== Mountains classification ===
Final mountains classification (1–10)
Rank	Name	Team	Points
1	Franco Bitossi (ITA)	Filotex	490
2	Julio Jiménez (ESP)	Ford France	320
3	Gianni Motta (ITA)	Molteni	160
4	Italo Zilioli (ITA)	Sanson	150
5	Silvano Schiavon (ITA)	Legnano	120
6	Ambrogio Portalupi (ITA)	Vittadello	110
7	Graziano Battistini (ITA)	Vittadello	80
7	Marcello Mugnaini (ITA)	Filotex	80
9	Rudi Altig (FRG)	Molteni	70
10	Flaviano Vicentini (ITA)	Legnano	60
10	Jacques Anquetil (FRA)	Ford France	60

=== Points classification ===
Final points classification (1–10)
Rank	Name	Team	Points
1	Gianni Motta (ITA)	Molteni	228
2	Rudi Altig (FRG)	Molteni	162
3	Vito Taccone (ITA)	Vittadello	152
4	Franco Bitossi (ITA)	Filotex	147
5	Dino Zandegù (ITA)	Bianchi	134
6	Jacques Anquetil (FRA)	Ford France	133
7	Felice Gimondi (ITA)	Salvarani	130
8	Jos Huysmans (BEL)	Mann	119
9	Italo Zilioli (ITA)	Sanson	114
10	Vittorio Adorni (ITA)	Salvarani	106
10	Michele Dancelli (ITA)	Molteni	106

=== Teams classification ===
Final team classification (1–10)
Rank	Team	Points
1	Molteni	3276
2	Ford France	2469
3	Filotex	1752
4	Sanson	1732
5	Bianchi	1722
6	Vittadello	1623
7	Salvarani	1496
8	Mann	1242
9	Mainetti	921
10	Legnano	777
