= Rudi Zollinger =

Swiss cyclist

Personal information
- Born: 10 March 1944 (age 82) Schlieren, Switzerland

Cycling career
- Sport: Cycling
- Discipline: Road
- Role: Rider

Professional team
- 1966–1967: Tigra–Meltina

Rudi Zollinger (born 10 March 1944) is a Swiss former racing cyclist. His twin brother Paul was also a professional cyclist. He most notably finished 3rd overall in the 1966 Tour de Suisse. He also rode in the 1966 Paris–Roubaix.

== Major results ==
1964
4th Overall Tour de l'Avenir
1966
3rd Overall Tour de Suisse
7th Overall Tour de Romandie
