= Paul Zollinger =

Swiss cyclist

Personal information
- Born: 10 March 1944 (age 82) Schlieren, Switzerland

Cycling career
- Sport: Cycling
- Discipline: Road
- Role: Rider

Professional teams
- 1966–1968: Tigra–Meltina
- 1968: Frimatic–Wolber–de Gribaldy

Paul Zollinger (born 10 March 1944) is a Swiss former racing cyclist. He was the Swiss National Road Race champion in 1966. His twin brother Rudi was also a professional cyclist.

== Major results ==
1966
1st Road race, National Road Championships
7th Overall Tour de Suisse
8th GP du canton d'Argovie
1967
2nd Züri-Metzgete
