= 1959 Tour de Suisse =

Race details
- Dates: 12–18 June 1959
- Stages: 7
- Distance: 1,317 km (818.3 mi)
- Winning time: 37h 57' 24"

Results
	Winner	Hans Junkermann (FRG)
	Second	Henry Anglade (FRA)
	Third	Federico Bahamontes (ESP)

The 1959 Tour de Suisse was the 23rd edition of the Tour de Suisse cycle race and was held from 12 June to 18 June 1959. The race started and finished in Zürich. The race was won by Hans Junkermann.

== General classification ==
Final general classification

Rank	Rider	Time
1	Hans Junkermann (FRG)	37h 57' 24"
2	Henry Anglade (FRA)	+ 10' 19"
3	Federico Bahamontes (ESP)	+ 10' 45"
4	Giorgio Tinazzi (ITA)	+ 12' 09"
5	Jean Dotto (FRA)	+ 16' 39"
6	Friedhelm Fischerkeller (FRG)	+ 28' 18"
7	Martin van der Borgh (NED)	+ 32' 52"
8	Kurt Gimmi (SUI)	+ 35' 27"
9	Jean-Claude Grèt (SUI)	+ 43' 06"
10	Alfred Rüegg (SUI)	+ 44' 47"
