= 1966 Tour de Suisse =

Race details
- Dates: 12–19 June 1966
- Stages: 7
- Distance: 1,276 km (792.9 mi)
- Winning time: 42h 27' 11"

Results
	Winner	Ambrogio Portalupi (ITA)	(Vittadello)
	Second	Carlo Chiappano (ITA)	(Sanson)
	Third	Rudi Zollinger (SUI)	(Tigra)
	Mountains	Rudi Zollinger (SUI)	(Tigra)
	Team	Tigra	

The 1966 Tour de Suisse was the 30th edition of the Tour de Suisse cycle race and was held from 12 June to 19 June 1966. The race started and finished in Zürich. The race was won by Ambrogio Portalupi of the Vittadello team.

== General classification ==
Final general classification

Rank	Rider	Team	Time
1	Ambrogio Portalupi (ITA)	Vittadello	42h 27' 11"
2	Carlo Chiappano (ITA)	Sanson	+ 12"
3	Rudi Zollinger (SUI)	Tigra	+ 1' 55"
4	Franco Balmamion (ITA)	Sanson	+ 2' 25"
5	Karl Brand (SUI)	Tigra	+ 2' 46"
6	Rolf Maurer (SUI)	Tigra	+ 2' 49"
7	Paul Zollinger (SUI)	Tigra	+ 3' 58"
8	Giancarlo Ferretti (ITA)	Dr. Mann–Grundig	+ 5' 54"
9	Vito Taccone (ITA)	Vittadello	+ 6' 20"
10	Aldo Moser (ITA)	Queen Anne	+ 6' 35"
