= 1966 Tour de Romandie =

Race details
- Dates: 12–15 May 1966
- Stages: 4
- Distance: 806 km (501 mi)
- Winning time: 22h 35' 52"

Results
	Winner	Gianni Motta (ITA)
	Second	Raymond Delisle (FRA)
	Third	Rolf Maurer (SUI)

The 1966 Tour de Romandie was the 20th edition of the Tour de Romandie cycle race and was held from 12 May to 15 May 1966. The race started in Geneva and finished in Lausanne. The race was won by Gianni Motta.

== General classification ==
Final general classification
Rank	Rider	Time
1	Gianni Motta (ITA)	22h 35' 52"
2	Raymond Delisle (FRA)	+ 2' 32"
3	Rolf Maurer (SUI)	+ 2' 51"
4	Robert Hagmann (SUI)	+ 3' 14"
5	Albert Herger (SUI)	+ 3' 30"
6	Louis Rostollan (FRA)	+ 4' 13"
7	Rudi Zollinger (SUI)	+ 5' 06"
8	Jean-Claude Lebaube (FRA)	+ 6' 12"
9	Silvano Schiavon (ITA)	+ 6' 38"
10	Felice Gimondi (ITA)	+ 6' 58"
