= Dino Zandegù =

Italian cyclist (born 1940)

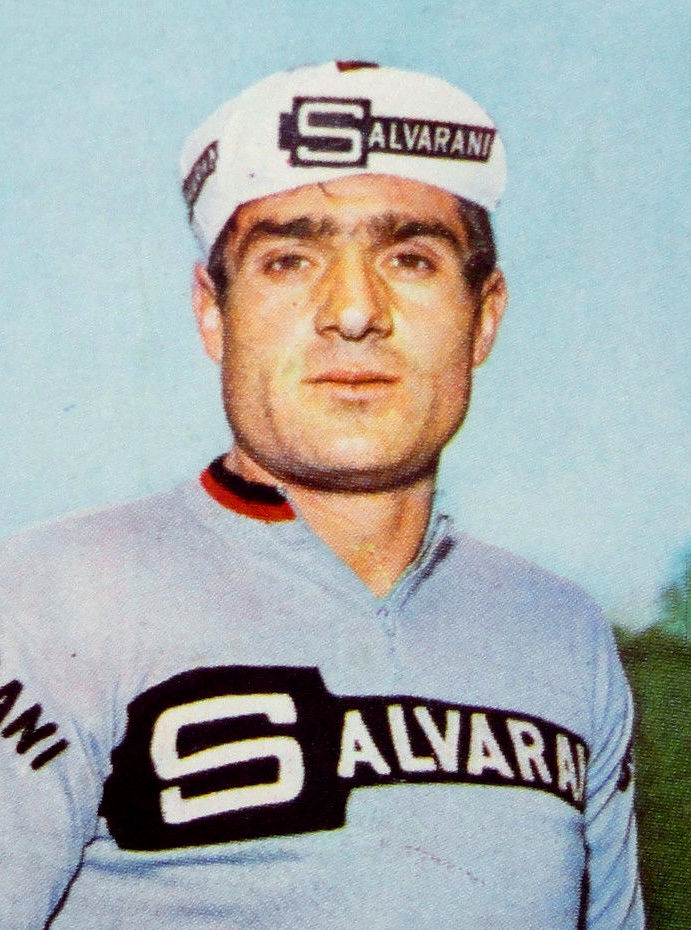
- Zandegù in 1969

Personal information
- Full name: Dino Zandegù
- Born: 31 May 1940 (age 86) Cassano d'Adda, Italy

Cycling career
- Sport: Cycling
- Discipline: Race
- Role: Rider
- Rider type: Sprinter

Professional teams
- 1963: Ignis
- 1964: Cynar
- 1965–1966: Bianchi-Mobylette
- 1967–1971: Salvarani
- 1972: G.B.C.

Major wins
- Grand Tours Giro d'Italia Points classification (1967) 6 individual stages (1966, 1967, 1970, 1971) 1 TTT stage (1971) Stage Races Tirreno–Adriatico (1966) One-day races and Classics Tour of Flanders (1967)

Dino Zandegù (born 31 May 1940) is an Italian former professional cyclist. He won the 1967 Tour of Flanders and the points classification at the 1967 Giro d'Italia. He retired from racing in 1972.

== Major results ==
1964
4th Züri–Metzgete
6th Tour des Quatre-Cantons
1965
1st Giro della Romagna
3rd Giro del Piemonte
6th Giro dell'Emilia
7th Coppa Sabatini
1966
1st Overall Tirreno–Adriatico

1st Stage 2

Giro d'Italia

1st Stages 10 & 12

2nd Coppa Bernocchi
2nd Giro della Romagna
2nd Giro di Toscana
2nd GP Montelupo
3rd Milano–Torino
3rd Giro della Provincia di Reggio Calabria
4th Road race, National Road Championships
5th Overall Giro di Sardegna

1st Stage 5

5th Giro di Campania
1967
1st Tour of Flanders
1st Trofeo Matteotti
1st Giro di Campania
1st Coppa Città di Busto Arsizio
Giro d'Italia

1st Points classification
1st Stages 4 & 18

3rd Giro del Ticino
4th Rund um den Henninger Turm
6th Overall Tirreno–Adriatico

1st Stage 5

6th Milan–San Remo
1968
1st Trofeo Masferrer
1st Stage 4 Volta a Catalunya
Giro di Sardegna

1st Stages 2, 4 & 5a

4th Flèche Enghiennoise
5th Giro della Provincia di Reggio Calabria
6th Tre Valli Varesine
6th Giro di Campania
7th Giro del Veneto
1969
1st Giro della Romagna
1st Trofeo Masferrer
1st Stage 4 Paris–Nice
1st Stage 2 Volta a Catalunya
1st Stage 5a Giro di Sardegna
2nd Tre Valli Varesine
3rd Overall Setmana Catalana de Ciclisme

1st Stage 1

3rd Milano–Vignola
4th Milan–San Remo
5th Trofeo Matteotti
5th Coppa Placci
1970
1st Stage 16 Giro d'Italia
1st Stage 8 Tour de Suisse
1st Stage 4a Tour de Romandie
4th Milano–Vignola
9th Züri–Metzgete
1971
Giro d'Italia

1st Prologue (TTT) & Stage 16
Held after Prologue

Tour de la Nouvelle-France

1st Stages 3 & 5a

5th Giro di Campania
6th Giro di Toscana
1972
Tour de la Nouvelle-France

1st Stages 4a & 5

=== Grand Tour general classification results timeline ===
Grand Tour	1963	1964	1965	1966	1967	1968	1969	1970	1971	1972
Vuelta a España	—	—	—	—	—	DNF	—	—	—	DNF
Giro d'Italia	—	73	29	11	18	—	27	60	52	DNF
Tour de France	—	—	—	—	—	—	36	—	—	—

=== Classics results timeline ===
Monuments results timeline
Monument	1963	1964	1965	1966	1967	1968	1969	1970	1971	1972
Milan–San Remo	—	102	—	36	6	27	4	—	—	70
Tour of Flanders	—	—	—	—	1	17	—	—	—	—
Paris–Roubaix	Did not contest during career									
Liège–Bastogne–Liège	Did not contest during career									
Giro di Lombardia	Did not contest during career									

Legend
—	Did not compete
DNF	Did not finish
