= 1963 Volta a Catalunya =

Race details
- Dates: 8–15 September 1963
- Stages: 8
- Distance: 1,282 km (796.6 mi)
- Winning time: 35h 01' 05"

Results
Jersey awarded to the overall winner	Winner	Joseph Novales (FRA)
	Second	Angelino Soler (ESP)
	Third	Antonio Suárez (ESP)

The 1963 Volta a Catalunya was the 43rd edition of the Volta a Catalunya cycle race and was held from 8 September to 15 September 1963. The race started in Montjuïc and finished in Barcelona. The race was won by Joseph Novales.

== General classification ==
Final general classification

Rank	Rider	Time
1	Joseph Novales (FRA)	35h 01' 05"
2	Angelino Soler (ESP)	+ 5' 30"
3	Antonio Suárez (ESP)	+ 5' 39"
4	Valentín Uriona (ESP)	+ 6' 10"
5	Eusebio Vélez (ESP)	+ 6' 54"
6	Francisco Gabica (ESP)	+ 6' 57"
7	Antonio Gómez del Moral (ESP)	+ 8' 54"
8	Peter Crinnion (IRL)	+ 9' 22"
9	Antonio Karmany (ESP)	+ 10' 20"
10	Fernando Manzaneque (ESP)	+ 10' 36"
