= Giovanni Knapp =

Italian racing cyclist (1943–2021)

Personal information
- Born: 28 July 1943 Belluno, Veneto, Italy
- Died: 21 February 2021 (aged 77) Belluno, Veneto, Italy

Cycling career
- Sport: Cycling
- Role: Rider

Giovanni Knapp (28 July 1943 – 21 February 2021) was an Italian racing cyclist. He won stage 4 of the 1966 Giro d'Italia. He died after suffering a fall in February 2021 at the age of 77.
