= 1966 Tirreno–Adriatico =

Race details
- Dates: 11–13 March 1966
- Stages: 3
- Distance: 603.5 km (375.0 mi)
- Winning time: 15h 43' 42"

Results
	Winner	Dino Zandegù (ITA)
	Second	Vito Taccone (ITA)
	Third	Rolf Maurer (SUI)

The 1966 Tirreno–Adriatico was the first edition of the Tirreno–Adriatico cycle race and was held from 11 March to 13 March 1966. The race started in Rome and finished in Pescara. The race was won by Dino Zandegù.

== General classification ==
Final general classification

Rank	Rider	Time
1	Dino Zandegù (ITA)	15h 43' 42"
2	Vito Taccone (ITA)	+ 0"
3	Rolf Maurer (SUI)	+ 1' 32"
4	Adriano Passuello (ITA)	+ 1' 32"
5	Flaviano Vicentini (ITA)	+ 1' 32"
6	Franco Cribiori (ITA)	+ 1' 32"
7	Guido De Rosso (ITA)	+ 1' 32"
8	Franco Balmamion (ITA)	+ 1' 32"
9	Claudio Michelotto (ITA)	+ 1' 32"
10	Franco Bitossi (ITA)	+ 1' 32"
