= Tour de Suisse =

Swiss multi-day road cycling race

Race details
- Date: June
- Region: Switzerland
- English name: Tour of Switzerland
- Local name: Tour de Suisse (in French)
- Discipline: Road race
- Competition: UCI World Tour; UCI Women's World Tour
- Type: Major one week stage race
- Organiser: IMG
- Race director: Olivier Senn
- Web site: www.tourdesuisse.ch

History (men)
- First edition: 1933
- Editions: 89 (as of 2026)
- First winner: Max Bulla (AUT)
- Most wins: Pasquale Fornara (ITA) (4 wins)
- Most recent: Tadej Pogačar (SLO)

History (women)
- First edition: 1998
- Editions: 10 (as of 2026)
- First winner: Rasa Polikevičiūtė (LTU)
- Most wins: Marlen Reusser (SUI) (3 wins)
- Most recent: Marlen Reusser (SUI)

The Tour de Suisse (English: Tour of Switzerland) is an annual road cycling stage race. Raced over eight days, the event covers two weekends in June, and along with the Critérium du Dauphiné, it is considered a proving ground for the Tour de France, which is on the calendar approximately two weeks after the end of the Tour de Suisse. Since 2011 the event is part of the UCI World Tour, cycling's highest level of professional races.

From 2021, a women's race has been held at the same time, with the event joining the UCI Women's World Tour from 2023.

== History ==
The men's race was first held in 1933 and has evolved in timing, duration and sponsorship. Like the Tour de France and the Dauphiné, the Tour de Suisse has historically had several stages with significant mountain climbs in the Swiss Alps and at least one individual time trial. Several winners of the Tour de Suisse have also won the Tour de France, including Eddy Merckx and Jan Ullrich. In 2005 the Tour de Suisse was included in the inaugural UCI Pro Tour and organisers moved the race to earlier in June.

In 2026, the men's race was shortened to 5 stages and held in conjunction with the women's race owing to reduced budget and logistical issues. Winner of the 2026 men's race Tadej Pogačar welcomed "women and men being part of the same race at the same time".

The first winner of the men's race was Austrian Max Bulla in the 1933 edition. The rider with most wins is Italian Pasquale Fornara who won the men's race four times in the 1950s.

=== Women's race ===
A women's race was first held in 1998, won by Lithuanian rider Rasa Polikevičiūtė. Three further editions were held between 1999 and 2001. The event was restarted in 2021 in conjunction with the men's event, taking place over two days. In 2022, the race was lengthened to four days and became part of the UCI Women's ProSeries. In 2023 the race joined the UCI Women's World Tour. The race was originally considered a proving ground for the Giro d'Italia Women, which followed the race on the calendar. In 2026, the race was extended to 5 days, taking place in conjunction with the men's race.

The rider with the most wins is Swiss rider Marlen Reusser, with three overall victories in 2023, 2025 and 2026.

== Winners ==
=== Men's race ===
Year	Country	Rider	Team
1933	Austria	Max Bulla	
1934	Germany	Ludwig Geyer	
1935	France	Gaspard Rinaldi	
1936	Belgium	Henri Garnier	
1937	Switzerland	Karl Litschi	
1938	Italy	Giovanni Valetti	
1939	Switzerland	Robert Zimmermann	
1940	No race		
1941	Switzerland	Josef Wagner	
1942	Switzerland	Ferdinand Kübler	
1943– 1945	No race		
1946	Italy	Gino Bartali	
1947	Italy	Gino Bartali	
1948	Switzerland	Ferdinand Kübler	
1949	Switzerland	Gottfried Weilenmann	
1950	Switzerland	Hugo Koblet	
1951	Switzerland	Ferdinand Kübler	
1952	Italy	Pasquale Fornara	
1953	Switzerland	Hugo Koblet	
1954	Italy	Pasquale Fornara	
1955	Switzerland	Hugo Koblet	
1956	Switzerland	Rolf Graf	
1957	Italy	Pasquale Fornara	
1958	Italy	Pasquale Fornara	
1959	West Germany	Hans Junkermann	
1960	Switzerland	Alfred Rüegg	
1961	Switzerland	Attilio Moresi	
1962	West Germany	Hans Junkermann	
1963	Italy	Giuseppe Fezzardi	
1964	Switzerland	Rolf Maurer	
1965	Italy	Franco Bitossi	
1966	Italy	Ambrogio Portalupi	
1967	Italy	Gianni Motta	Molteni
1968	Switzerland	Louis Pfenninger	
1969	Italy	Vittorio Adorni	
1970	Italy	Roberto Poggiali	
1971	Belgium	Georges Pintens	
1972	Switzerland	Louis Pfenninger	
1973	Spain	José Manuel Fuente	Kas–Kaskol
1974	Belgium	Eddy Merckx	Molteni
1975	Belgium	Roger De Vlaeminck	Brooklyn
1976	Netherlands	Hennie Kuiper	TI–Raleigh–Campagnolo
1977	Belgium	Michel Pollentier	Flandria–Velda–Latina Assicurazioni
1978	Belgium	Paul Wellens	TI–Raleigh–McGregor
1979	Belgium	Wilfried Wesemael	TI–Raleigh–McGregor
1980	Italy	Mario Beccia	Hoonved–Bottecchia
1981	Switzerland	Beat Breu	Cilo–Aufina
1982	Italy	Giuseppe Saronni	Del Tongo
1983	Ireland	Sean Kelly	Sem–France Loire–Reydel–Mavic
1984	Switzerland	Urs Zimmermann	Cilo–Aufina–Crans–Montana
1985	Australia	Phil Anderson	Panasonic–Raleigh
1986	United States	Andrew Hampsten	La Vie Claire
1987	United States	Andrew Hampsten	7-Eleven
1988	Austria	Helmut Wechselberger	Malvor–Bottecchia–Sidi
1989	Switzerland	Beat Breu	Domex–Weinmann
1990	Ireland	Sean Kelly	PDM–Concorde–Ultima
1991	Belgium	Luc Roosen	Tulip Computers
1992	Italy	Giorgio Furlan	Ariostea
1993	Italy	Marco Saligari	Ariostea
1994	Switzerland	Pascal Richard	GB–MG Maglificio
1995	Russia	Pavel Tonkov	Lampre–Panaria
1996	Austria	Peter Luttenberger	Carrera Jeans–Tassoni
1997	France	Christophe Agnolutto	Casino
1998	Italy	Stefano Garzelli	Mercatone Uno–Bianchi
1999	Italy	Francesco Casagrande	Vini Caldirola
2000	Switzerland	Oscar Camenzind	Lampre–Daikin
2001	Italy	Gilberto Simoni (Note: The race was initially won by Lance Armstrong, but he was stripped of this victory in October 2012.)	Lampre–Daikin
2002	Switzerland	Alex Zülle	Team Coast
2003	Kazakhstan	Alexander Vinokourov	Team Telekom
2004	Germany	Jan Ullrich	T-Mobile Team
2005	Spain	Aitor González	Euskaltel–Euskadi
2006	Spain	Koldo Gil (Note: The race was initially won by Jan Ullrich, but he was stripped of this victory in February 2012.)	Saunier Duval–Prodir
2007	Russia	Vladimir Karpets	Caisse d'Epargne
2008	Czech Republic	Roman Kreuziger	Liquigas
2009	Switzerland	Fabian Cancellara	Team Saxo Bank
2010	Luxembourg	Fränk Schleck	Team Saxo Bank
2011	United States	Levi Leipheimer	Team RadioShack
2012	Portugal	Rui Costa	Movistar Team
2013	Portugal	Rui Costa	Movistar Team
2014	Portugal	Rui Costa	Lampre–Merida
2015	Slovenia	Simon Špilak	Team Katusha
2016	Colombia	Miguel Ángel López	Astana
2017	Slovenia	Simon Špilak	Team Katusha–Alpecin
2018	Australia	Richie Porte	BMC Racing Team
2019	Colombia	Egan Bernal	Team INEOS
2020	No race due to the COVID-19 pandemic in Switzerland		
2021	Ecuador	Richard Carapaz	INEOS Grenadiers
2022	Great Britain	Geraint Thomas	INEOS Grenadiers
2023	Denmark	Mattias Skjelmose	Trek–Segafredo
2024	Great Britain	Adam Yates	UAE Team Emirates
2025	Portugal	João Almeida	UAE Team Emirates XRG
2026	Slovenia	Tadej Pogačar	UAE Team Emirates XRG

=== Women's race ===
Year	Country	Rider	Team
1998	Lithuania	Rasa Polikevičiūtė	Ebly
1999	Russia	Zulfiya Zabirova	Acca Due O
2000	Russia	Zulfiya Zabirova	Acca Due O–Lorena Camichie
2001	United States	Kimberly Baldwin	Saturn Cycling Team
2002-2020	No race		
2021	Great Britain	Lizzie Deignan	Trek–Segafredo
2022	Netherlands	Lucinda Brand	Trek–Segafredo
2023	Switzerland	Marlen Reusser	SD Worx
2024	Netherlands	Demi Vollering	Team SD Worx–Protime
2025	Switzerland	Marlen Reusser	Movistar Team
2026	Switzerland	Marlen Reusser	Movistar Team

== Men's race statistics ==
=== Multiple winners ===
Rider	Country	Titles	Year
Pasquale Fornara	Italy	4	1952, 1954, 1957, 1958
Ferdinand Kübler	Switzerland	3	1942, 1948, 1951
Hugo Koblet	Switzerland	3	1950, 1953, 1955
Rui Costa	Portugal	3	2012, 2013, 2014
Gino Bartali	Italy	2	1946, 1947
Hans Junkermann	West Germany	2	1959, 1962
Louis Pfenninger	Switzerland	2	1968, 1972
Beat Breu	Switzerland	2	1981, 1989
Sean Kelly	Ireland	2	1983, 1990
Andrew Hampsten	United States	2	1986, 1987
Simon Špilak	Slovenia	2	2015, 2017

=== By country ===
Wins	Country
23	Switzerland
20	Italy
8	Belgium
4	Germany (including West Germany); Portugal
3	Austria; Slovenia; Spain; United States
2	Australia; Colombia; France; Ireland; Russia; Great Britain
1	Czech Republic; Denmark; Ecuador; Kazakhstan; Luxembourg; Netherlands

== See also ==
- List of highest paved roads in Switzerland
