= Gianni Motta =

Italian cyclist

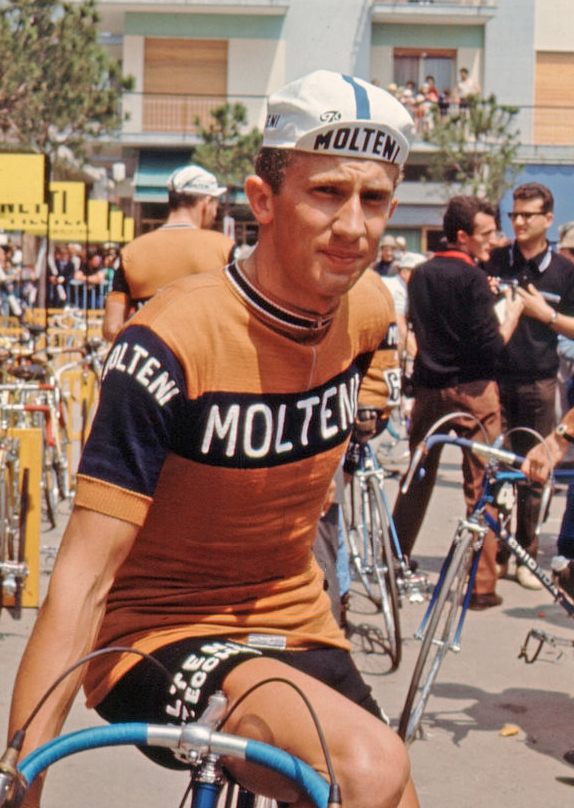
- Motta at the 1966 Giro d'Italia

Personal information
- Full name: Gianni Motta
- Born: 13 March 1943 (age 83) Cassano d'Adda, Italy

Cycling career
- Sport: Cycling
- Discipline: Race
- Role: Rider

Professional teams
- 1964–1968: Molteni
- 1969: Sanson
- 1970–1971: Salvarani
- 1972: Ferretti
- 1973: Zonca
- 1974: Magniflex
- 1976: G.B.C.

Major wins
- Grand Tours Giro d'Italia General classification (1966) Points classification (1966) 6 individual stages (1964, 1966, 1968, 1972, 1973) Stage Races Tour de Romandie (1966, 1971) Tour de Suisse (1967) One-day races and Classics Giro di Lombardia (1964) Tre Valli Varesine (1965–1967, 1970) Milano–Torino (1967) Giro dell'Emilia (1968, 1969, 1971)

Gianni Motta (born 13 March 1943) is an Italian former bicycle racer who won the 1966 Giro d'Italia.

Gianni Motta was born at Cassano d'Adda (Lombardy). His main victories include the Giro d'Italia (1966), a Giro di Lombardia (1964), a Tour de Suisse (1967) and two Tour de Romandie (1966, 1971).

Like many before him, he turned to manufacturing and sales of bicycles after his racing career. In 1984, to promote his bike brand in the USA, he sponsored Gianni Motta–Linea M.D. Italia team that became the first American registered team to compete in Giro d'Italia.

== Doping ==
While at Molteni in 1968, Motta tested positive for a banned substance and his results in the 1968 Giro d'Italia were removed.

== Major results ==
1964
1st Giro di Lombardia
1st Coppa Bernocchi
1st Trofeo Baracchi
1st Stage 3b Tour de Romandie
5th Overall Giro d'Italia

1st Stage 21

2nd Giro dell'Appennino
2nd Giro delle Tre Provincie
3rd Giro del Veneto
8th Coppa Placci
1965
1st Tre Valli Varesine
1st Stage 2 Grand Prix du Midi Libre
2nd GP Lugano
3rd Overall Tour de France
3rd Giro di Campania
3rd Milano-Vignola
4th Coppa Bernocchi
5th Giro di Lombardia
8th Overall Paris–Nice
9th Milan–San Remo
1966
1st Overall Giro d'Italia

1st Points classification
1st Stages 17 & 19

1st Overall Tour de Romandie

1st Stage 2

1st Overall (TTT) Cronostaffetta

1st Stage 1b

1st Giro di Romagna
1st Tre Valli Varesine
3rd Gran Piemonte
1967
1st Overall Tour de Suisse

1st Stages 2 & 3

1st Overall (TTT) Cronostaffetta

1st Stage 1b

1st Milano–Torino
1st Tre Valli Varesine
1st Stage 4 Tour de Romandie
2nd Milan–San Remo
4th Road race, UCI Road World Championships
6th Overall Giro di Sardegna
6th Overall Giro d'Italia
9th GP Alghero
1968
1st Overall (TTT) Cronostaffetta
1st Giro dell'Appennino
1st Giro dell'Emilia
1st Stage 4 Tour de Romandie
4th Giro di Toscana
~~6th Overall Giro d'Italia~~

~~1st Stage 8~~ (Note: Motta, was found to have used performance enhancing drugs and his results were subsequently voided.)

7th Zuri Metzgete
1969
1st Overall Escalada a Montjuïc

1st Stage 1b

1st Giro dell'Emilia
2nd Giro di Romagna
5th Zuri Metzgete
1970
1st Overall (TTT) Cronostaffetta

1st Stage 1c

1st Giro dell'Appennino
1st Tre Valli Varesine
1st Giro dell'Umbria
1st Stage 1a Escalada a Montjuïc
2nd Col San Martino
3rd Overall À travers Lausanne
3rd Giro di Lombardia
10th Giro dell'Emilia
1971
1st Overall Tour de Romandie

1st Stages 4 & 5a

1st Giro dell'Emilia
1st Col San Martino
2nd Gran Piemonte
4th Overall Giro di Sardegna
6th Trofeo Laigueglia
7th Overall Tirreno–Adriatico

1st Stage 1

7th Milan–San Remo
10th La Flèche Wallonne
1972
1st Stage 2 Giro d'Italia
2nd Milan–San Remo
3rd Milano–Torino
4th Giro di Puglia
8th Overall Tour de Romandie
1973
1st Stage 1 Monte Campione
2nd Giro dell'Appennino
3rd Milano-Vignola
6th Giro dell'Emilia
7th Coppa Placci
10th Overall Giro d'Italia

1st Stage 6

1974
1st Stage 5 Giro di Puglia
1976
9th Milano-Vignola

=== Grand Tour general classification results timeline ===
Grand Tour	1964	1965	1966	1967	1968	1969	1970	1971	1972	1973	1974	1975	1976
Vuelta a España	—	—	—	—	—	—	—	—	—	—	—	—	—
Giro d'Italia	5	—	1	6	DSQ	—	—	20	DNF	10	24	—	DNF
Tour de France	—	3	—	—	—	—	—	DNF	—	—	—	—	—

Legend
—	Did not compete
DNF	Did not finish
DSQ	Disqualified
