= João Almeida =

João Almeida may refer to:

- João Almeida (footballer, born 1947), Brazilian footballer
- João de Almeida (general) (1872–1953), Portuguese commander
- Joãozinho Almeida (born 1954), Brazilian footballer
- Joãozinho Neto (born 1980), Brazilian footballer
- João Augusto Ferreira de Almeida (1894–1917), executed Portuguese soldier
- João Carlos Almeida (born 1988), Portuguese track and field athlete
- João Almeida (cyclist) (born 1998), Portuguese cyclist
- João Tavares (born 1998), Portuguese footballer
- João Almeida (footballer, born 1993), Portuguese footballer
- João Almeida (footballer, born 2006), Brazilian footballer
