= 1957 Tour de Suisse =

Race details
- Dates: 12–20 June 1957
- Stages: 8
- Distance: 1,568 km (974.3 mi)
- Winning time: 44h 32' 16"

Results
	Winner	Pasquale Fornara (ITA)
	Second	Edgard Sorgeloos (BEL)
	Third	Attilio Moresi (SUI)

The 1957 Tour de Suisse was the 21st edition of the Tour de Suisse cycle race and was held from 12 June to 20 June 1957. The race started and finished in Zürich. The race was won by Pasquale Fornara.

== General classification ==
Final general classification

Rank	Rider	Time
1	Pasquale Fornara (ITA)	44h 32' 16"
2	Edgard Sorgeloos (BEL)	+ 1' 21"
3	Attilio Moresi (SUI)	+ 1' 42"
4	Hans Junkermann (FRG)	+ 2' 14"
5	Lothar Friedrich (FRG)	+ 2' 45"
6	Hilaire Couvreur (BEL)	+ 3' 00"
7	Carlo Clerici (SUI)	+ 8' 47"
8	Nino Assirelli (ITA)	+ 11' 35"
9	Raymond Reisser (FRA)	+ 13' 20"
10	Adolf Christian (AUT)	+ 13' 40"
