= Joseph Novales =

French cyclist

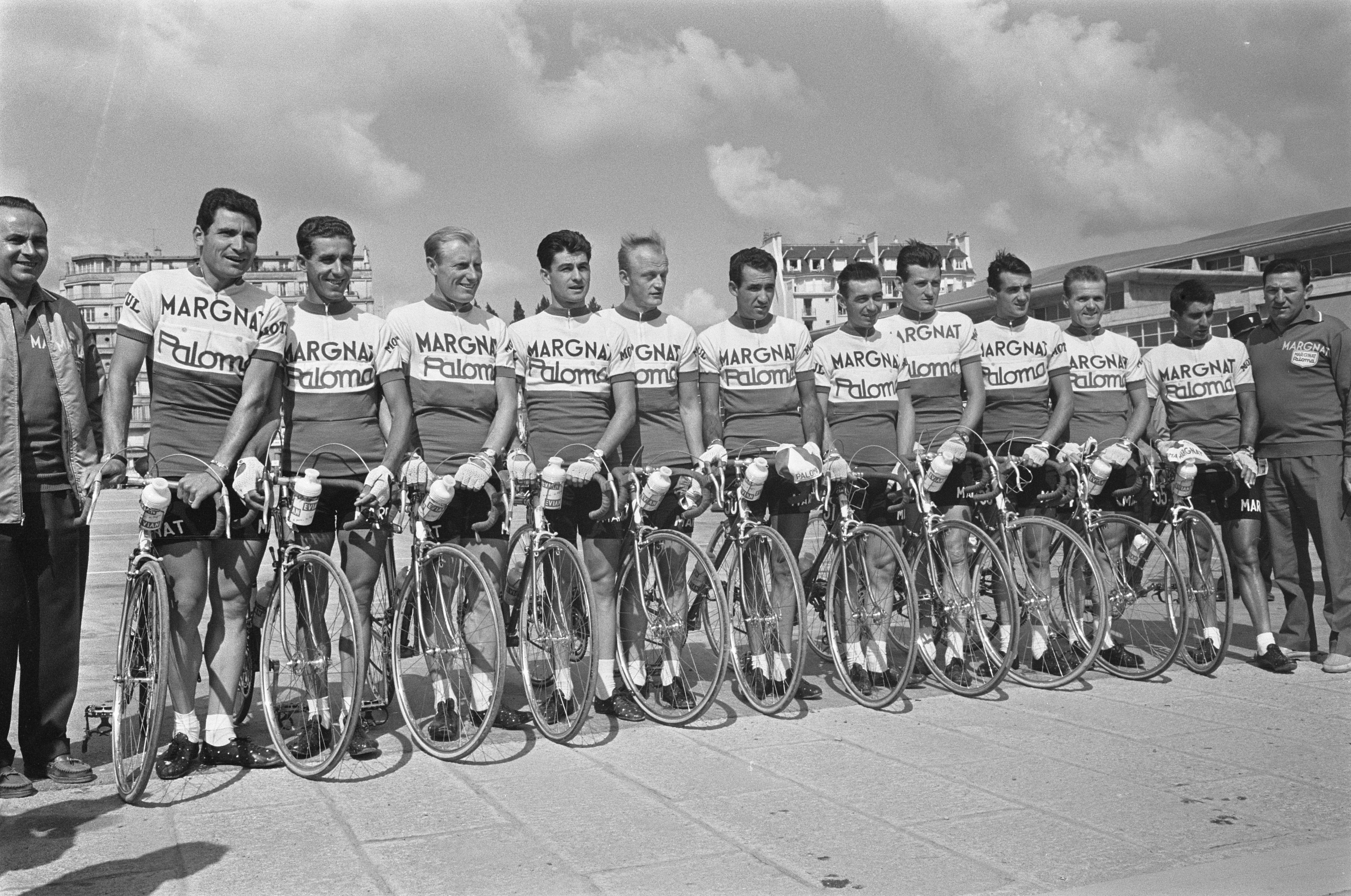

Personal information
- Born: 23 July 1937 Torralba de Aragón, Spain
- Died: 23 March 1985 (aged 47) Libreville, Gabon, France

Cycling career
- Sport: Cycling
- Discipline: Road
- Role: Rider

Professional teams
- 1962–1965: Margnat–Paloma
- 1966: Kamomé–Dilecta

Joseph Novales (23 July 1937 – 23 March 1985) was a French professional cyclist. He was professional from 1962 until 1966.

== Biography ==
Joseph Novales was born in Torralba de Aragón on July 23, 1937 and died in Libreville, France at the age of 47. He was accorded the citizenship of France in 1950.

== Career ==
He competed in three Tour de France editions, between 1962 and 1966. His cycling career spanned 5 seasons, from 1962 to 1966, in which he obtained a total of 13 victories.

== Major results ==
1962
3rd Overall Tour de Romandie

1st Stage 1b

1963
1st Overall Volta a Catalunya
1st Trofeo Baracchi
1st Circuito du Morbihan
2nd GP du Parisien
1964
1st Trofeo Jaumendreu
1st Stage 5 Critérium du Dauphiné
3rd Overall Critérium International

1st Stage 2

9th Overall Tour de Romandie
1965
1st Stage 1 Vuelta a Andalucía

=== Grand Tour results ===
==== Tour de France ====
- 1962: DNF
- 1964: 19th
- 1966: DNF

==== Vuelta a España results ====
- 1965: DNF
