= 1962 Tour de Romandie =

Race details
- Dates: 10–13 May 1962
- Stages: 4
- Distance: 831 km (516 mi)
- Winning time: 22h 33' 53"

Results
	Winner	Guido De Rosso (ITA)
	Second	Franco Cribiori (ITA)
	Third	Joseph Novales (FRA)

The 1962 Tour de Romandie was the 16th edition of the Tour de Romandie cycle race and was held from 10 May to 13 May 1962. The race started and finished in Geneva. The race was won by Guido De Rosso.

== General classification ==
Final general classification
Rank	Rider	Time
1	Guido De Rosso (ITA)	22h 33' 53"
2	Franco Cribiori (ITA)	+ 5' 08"
3	Joseph Novales (FRA)	+ 6' 06"
4	Graziano Battistini (ITA)	+ 6' 56"
5	Willy Schroeders (BEL)	+ 7' 01"
6	Raymond Impanis (BEL)	+ 7' 47"
7	Federico Bahamontes (ESP)	+ 7' 51"
8	Rolf Graf (SUI)	+ 7' 55"
9	Gilbert Bellone (FRA)	+ 8' 26"
10	Henry Anglade (FRA)	+ 8' 27"
