= 1967 Tour of Flanders =

51st Tour of Flanders
Race details
- Dates: 9 April 1967
- Stages: 1
- Distance: 245 km (152.2 mi)
- Winning time: 6h 16' 00"

Results
	Winner	Dino Zandegù (ITA)	(Salvarani–Chiorda)
	Second	Noël Foré (BEL)	(Goldor–Gerka)
	Third	Eddy Merckx (BEL)	(Peugeot–BP–Michelin)

The 51st Tour of Flanders cycling classic was held on Sunday, 2 April 1967. The race was won by Italian rider Dino Zandegù in a two-man sprint with Noël Foré. Eddy Merckx won the sprint for third place. 92 of 139 riders finished.

== Route ==
The race started in Ghent and finished in Gentbrugge – covering 245 km. The Kwaremont was re-included after the road works had suppressed it the previous years. There were four categorized climbs:

- Kwaremont
- Kloosterstraat (Geraardsbergen)
- Valkenberg
- Kasteelstraat

== Results ==
Result
Rank	Rider	Team	Time
1	Dino Zandegù (ITA)	Salvarani–Chiorda	6h 16' 00"
2	Noël Foré (BEL)	Goldor–Gerka	s.t.
3	Eddy Merckx (BEL)	Peugeot–BP–Michelin	+ 20"
4	Felice Gimondi (ITA)	Salvarani–Chiorda	s.t.
5	Barry Hoban (GBR)	Mercier–BP–Hutchinson	s.t.
6	Willy Monty (BEL)	Pelforth–Sauvage–Lejeune	s.t.
7	Guido Reybrouck (BEL)	Romeo–Smiths	s.t.
8	Herman Van Springel (BEL)	Mann–Grundig	s.t.
9	Jan Janssen (NED)	Pelforth–Sauvage–Lejeune	s.t.
10	Gerben Karstens (NED)	Televizier–Batavus	s.t.
