= 1941 Tour de Suisse =

Race details
- Dates: 23–24 August 1941
- Stages: 3
- Distance: 607 km (377.2 mi)
- Winning time: 16h 59' 19"

Results
| | Winner | Josef Wagner (SUI) |
| | Second | Werner Buchwalder (SUI) |
| | Third | Ferdinand Kübler (SUI) |

The 1941 Tour de Suisse was the eighth edition of the Tour de Suisse cycle race and was held from 23 August to 24 August 1941. The race started and finished in Zürich. The race was won by Josef Wagner.

== General classification ==
Final general classification

| Rank | Rider | Time |
|---|---|---|
| 1 | Josef Wagner (SUI) | 16h 59' 19" |
| 2 | Werner Buchwalder (SUI) | + 0" |
| 3 | Ferdinand Kübler (SUI) | + 11' 42" |
| 4 | Hans Maag (SUI) | + 16' 22" |
| 5 | Hans Knecht (SUI) | + 20' 53" |
| 6 | André Hardegger (SUI) | + 24' 06" |
| 7 | Walter Diggelmann (SUI) | + 30' 05" |
| 8 | Robert Zimmermann (SUI) | + 30' 44" |
| 9 | Fritz Saladin (SUI) | + 37' 14" |
| 10 | Karl Wyss (SUI) | + 38' 52" |
