= 1964 Giro di Lombardia =

Race details
- Dates: 17 October 1964
- Stages: 1
- Distance: 266 km (165.3 mi)
- Winning time: 6h 54' 00"

Results
	Winner	Gianni Motta (ITA)	(Molteni)
	Second	Carmine Preziosi (ITA)	(Pelforth–Sauvage–Lejeune)
	Third	Jos Hoevenaers (BEL)	(Flandria–Romeo)

The 1964 Giro di Lombardia was the 58th edition of the Giro di Lombardia cycle race and was held on 17 October 1964. The race started in Milan and finished in Como. The race was won by Gianni Motta of the Molteni team.

== General classification ==
Final general classification

Rank	Rider	Team	Time
1	Gianni Motta (ITA)	Molteni	6h 54' 00"
2	Carmine Preziosi (ITA)	Pelforth–Sauvage–Lejeune	+ 2' 06"
3	Jos Hoevenaers (BEL)	Flandria–Romeo	+ 2' 06"
4	Adriano Durante (ITA)	Legnano	+ 2' 06"
5	Italo Zilioli (ITA)	Carpano	+ 2' 38"
6	Michele Dancelli (ITA)	Molteni	+ 5' 35"
7	Jan Janssen (NED)	Pelforth–Sauvage–Lejeune	+ 6' 28"
8	Jean Marcarini (FRA)	Mercier–BP–Hutchinson	+ 6' 28"
9	Jo de Roo (NED)	Saint-Raphaël–Gitane–Dunlop	+ 6' 28"
10	Franco Cribiori (ITA)	Gazzola	+ 6' 28"
