= Guido De Rosso =

Italian cyclist (born 1940)

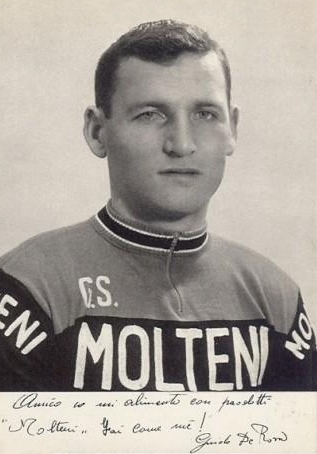
- Guido De Rosso in 1965

Personal information
- Full name: Guido De Rosso
- Born: 28 September 1940 (age 86) Farra di Soligo, Italy

Cycling career
- Sport: Cycling
- Discipline: Road
- Role: Rider

Professional teams
- 1962–1966: Molteni
- 1967: Vittadello
- 1968–1969: Faema

Major wins
- Tour de l'Avenir (1961); Tour de Romandie (1962); Giro del Trentino (1963); Giro del Ticino (1963); Milano–Vignola (1964, 1965); Italian National Road Race Championships (1964); Trofeo Matteotti (1964, 1965); Coppa Placci (1964); Col San Martino (1966); Giro di Campania (1966); Giro del Piemonte (1967)

Guido De Rosso (born 28 September 1940) is a retired Italian professional racing cyclist. He won several races in the 1960s and finished seventh at the 1965 Tour de France. He rode the Giro d'Italia in 1962–1965 and finished fourth in 1963 and third in 1964.

He was the first rider to get a professional victory while riding a Pinarello bicycle. It was two stages of the Tour de l'Avenir as well as winning overall.

To celebrate turning 80 Mattia Perencin, the mayor of Farra di Soligo, presented De Rosso with a plaque of his achievements.

== Major results ==
1960
1st Trofeo Banca Popolare di Vicenza
1961
1st Overall Tour de l'Avenir

1st Stages 5 & 9

4th Road race Amateur UCI Road World Championships
1962
1st Overall Tour de Romandie
3rd GP Ind. & Com.di Prato
3rd Giro del Veneto
6th Giro del Trentino
6th Milano–Vignola
6th Coppa Bernocchi
7th Giro dell'Emilia
9th Tre Valli Varesine
1963
1st Giro del Trentino
1st Giro del Ticino
2nd Giro del Veneto
3rd Overall Tour de Romandie

1st Stage 2

3rd Tre Valli Varesine
4th Overall Giro d'Italia
4th Giro dell'Appennino
4th Giro del Piemonte
4th GP Forli
5th Giro del Lazio
5th Trofeo Baracchi
7th Giro di Lombardia
7th Milano–Vignola
8th Züri-Metzgete
1964
1st Road race, National championships
1st Milano–Vignola
1st Trofeo Matteotti
1st Coppa Placci
2nd Giro del Veneto
3rd Overall Giro d'Italia
3rd Overall Giro di Sardegna
4th Giro dell'Appennino
4th Coppa Bernocchi
4th GP Cannes
8th Overall Tour de Romandie
1965
1st Trofeo Matteotti
1st Milano–Vignola
2nd Giro dell'Appennino
5th GP Ind. & Com.di Prato
7th Overall Tour de France
7th Coppa Placci
10th Overall Giro d'Italia
1966
1st Giro di Campania
3rd GP Union Dortmund
4th Giro della Toscana
5th Trofeo Laigueglia
7th Overall Tirreno–Adriatico
8th Overall Paris–Luxembourg
10th Giro della Provincia di Reggio Calabria
1967
1st Giro del Piemonte
2nd Giro dell'Emilia
3rd Giro dell'Appennino
3rd GP Campagnolo
7th Giro di Lombardia
8th GP Ind. & Com.di Prato
1968
4th Giro dell'Emilia
5th Overall Catalaanse Week
5th GP Camaiore
9th GP Ind. & Com.di Prato
1969
5th Milano–Torino
5th Classica Sarda
7th Overall Giro della Provincia di Reggio Calabria
