= Torralba de Aragón =

Coordinates: 41°56′N 0°30′W

Torralba de Aragón, Spain
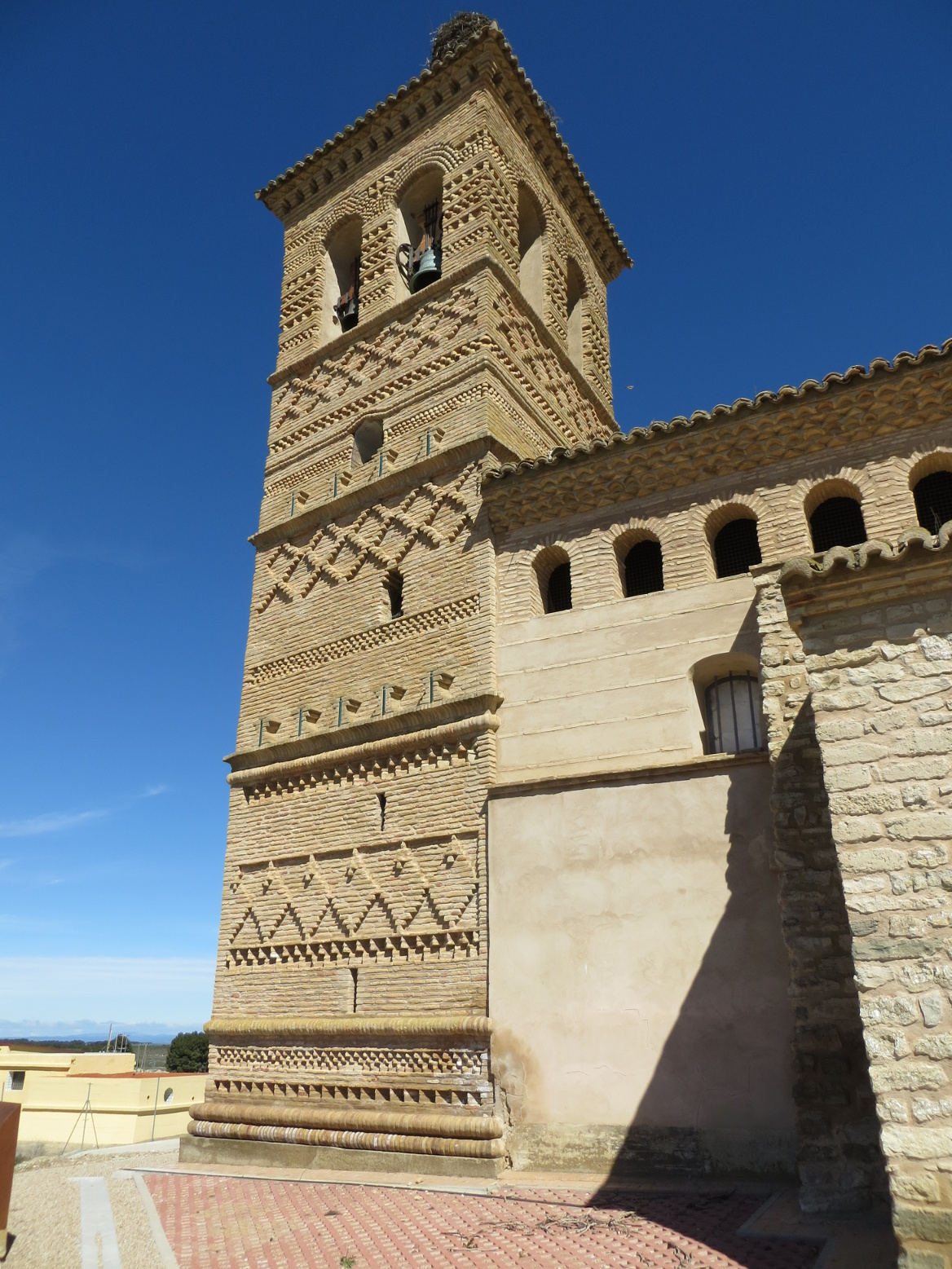
- The Mudejar tower of the Parish Church of Torralba de Aragón

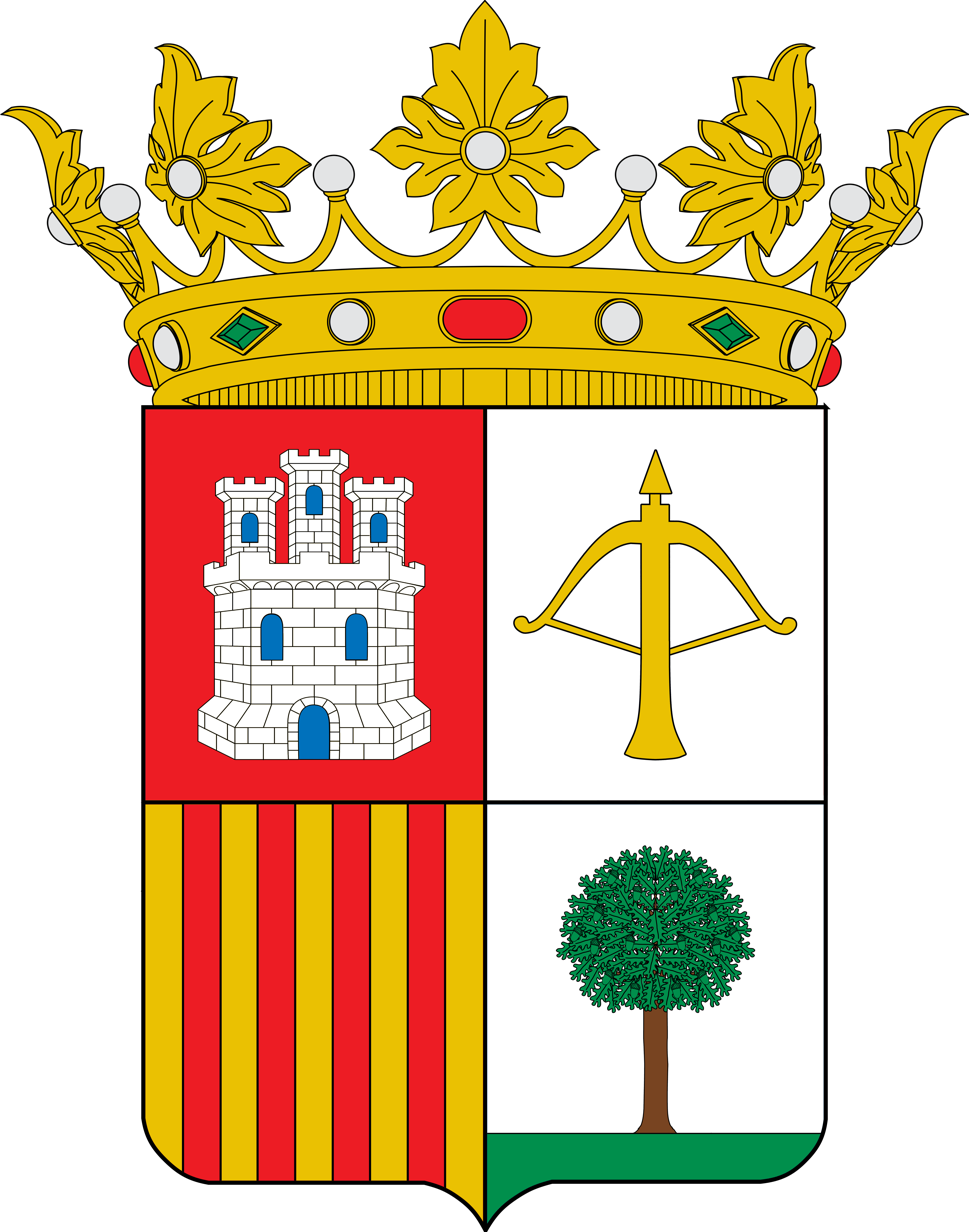
- Coat of arms
- Interactive map of Torralba de Aragón, Spain
- Country: Spain
- Autonomous community: Aragon
- Province: Huesca
- Municipality: Torralba de Aragón

Area
  - Total: 40.47 km^{2} (15.63 sq mi)
- Elevation: 380 m (1,250 ft)

Population (2025-01-01)
  - Total: 105
  - Density: 2.59/km^{2} (6.72/sq mi)
- Time zone: UTC+1 (CET)
  - Summer (DST): UTC+2 (CEST)

Torralba de Aragón is a municipality located in the province of Huesca, Aragon, Spain. According to the 2004 census (INE), the municipality had a population of 115 inhabitants.
