= 1964 Tour de Romandie =

Race details
- Dates: 7–10 May 1964
- Stages: 4
- Distance: 753 km (468 mi)
- Winning time: 20h 02' 49"

Results
	Winner	Rolf Maurer (SUI)
	Second	Huub Zilverberg (NLD)
	Third	Gastone Nencini (ITA)

The 1964 Tour de Romandie was the 18th edition of the Tour de Romandie cycle race and was held from 7 May to 10 May 1964. The race started and finished in Geneva. The race was won by Rolf Maurer.

== General classification ==
Final general classification
Rank	Rider	Time
1	Rolf Maurer (SUI)	20h 02' 49"
2	Huub Zilverberg (NLD)	+ 7"
3	Gastone Nencini (ITA)	+ 48"
4	Eddy Pauwels (BEL)	+ 1' 46"
5	Esteban Martín (ESP)	+ 2' 17"
6	Vito Taccone (ITA)	+ 4' 20"
7	Franco Balmamion (ITA)	+ 4' 40"
8	Guido De Rosso (ITA)	+ 5' 36"
9	Joseph Novales (ITA)	+ 5' 49"
10	René Binggeli (SUI)	+ 5' 52"
