= Josef Wagner (cyclist) =

Swiss cyclist (1916–2003)

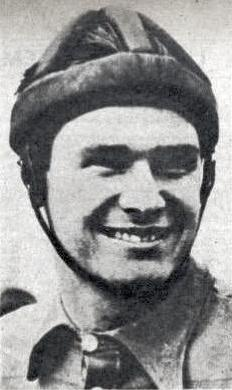
- Joseph Wagner (1939)

Personal information
- Born: 24 April 1916 Zürich, Switzerland
- Died: 25 September 2003 (aged 87) Bad Ragaz, Switzerland

Cycling career
- Sport: Cycling
- Discipline: Road
- Role: Rider

Major wins
- Tour de Suisse (1941)

Josef Wagner (24 April 1916 — 25 September 2003) was a Swiss cyclist.

== Major results ==
1938
2nd Amateur World Road Championships
1941
1st Overall Tour de Suisse
1943
2nd Tour du Lac Léman
1944
2nd National Road Race Championships
3rd Overall À travers Lausanne
1945
2nd National Road Race Championships
1946
2nd Overall Tour de Suisse

1st Stage 3b
