= Attilio Moresi =

Swiss cyclist

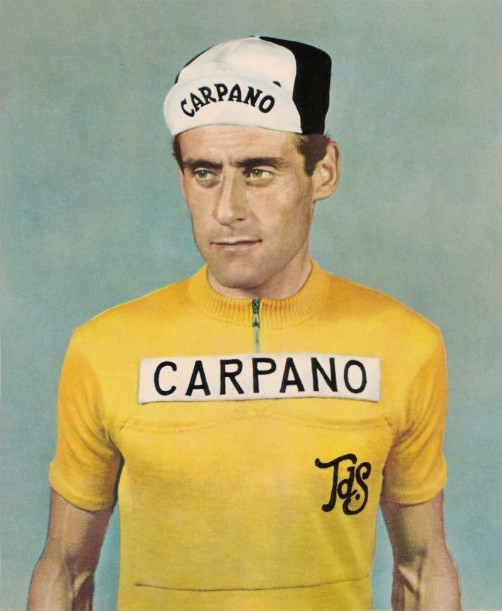
- Moresi in 1961 wearing the Tour de Suisse race leader's yellow jersey

Personal information
- Born: 26 July 1933 Lugano, Switzerland
- Died: 25 April 1995 (aged 61)

Cycling career
- Sport: Cycling
- Discipline: Road
- Role: Rider

Professional teams
- 1956–1960: Mondia
- 1957: Tichine–Vanini
- 1957: Faema–Guerra
- 1959: Molteni
- 1961: Carpano
- 1961: Baratti–Milano
- 1962: Gazzola–Fiorelli–Hutchinson
- 1963–1965: Cynar–Frejus

Attilio Moresi (26 July 1933 – 25 April 1995) was a Swiss cyclist. He was the Swiss National Road Race champion in 1963.

== Major results ==
1957
2nd Tour de Quatre-Cantons
3rd Overall Tour de Suisse
5th Overall Tour de Romandie
1958
2nd Tour de Quatre-Cantons
1960
3rd Tour du Nord-Ouest
4th Overall Tour de Suisse
5th Overall Tour de Romandie
1961
1st Overall Tour de Suisse
1962
6th Züri-Metzgete
1963
1st Road race, National Road Championships
3rd Overall Tour de Suisse

1st Stage 4

8th Overall Paris–Luxembourg
1964
7th GP du canton d'Argovie
1965
6th Züri-Metzgete
