= João Almeida (footballer, born 1993) =

Portuguese footballer

Personal information
- Full name: João Paulo Soares Almeida
- Date of birth: 10 January 1993 (age 33)
- Place of birth: Vale de Cambra, Portugal
- Height: 1.72 m (5 ft 7 1/2 in)
- Position: Midfielder

Team information
- Current team: Ovarense

Youth career
- 2002–2012: Oliveirense

Senior career*
Years	Team	Apps	(Gls)
2012–2016	Oliveirense	6	(0)
2015–2016	→ Estarreja (loan)	6	(0)
2016–2017	Bustelo	11	(0)
2017–	Ovarense	84	(3)
- * Club domestic league appearances and goals as of 1 October 2021

João Paulo Soares Almeida (born 10 January 1993) is a Portuguese footballer who plays for Ovarense as a midfielder.
