= 1963 Tour de Romandie =

Race details
- Dates: 9–12 May 1963
- Stages: 4
- Distance: 783.7 km (487.0 mi)
- Winning time: 20h 56' 54"

Results
	Winner	Willy Bocklant (BEL)
	Second	Federico Bahamontes (ESP)
	Third	Guido De Rosso (ITA)

The 1963 Tour de Romandie was the 17th edition of the Tour de Romandie cycle race and was held from 9 May to 12 May 1963. The race started and finished in Geneva. The race was won by Willy Bocklant.

== General classification ==
Final general classification
Rank	Rider	Time
1	Willy Bocklant (BEL)	20h 56' 54"
2	Federico Bahamontes (ESP)	+ 1' 56"
3	Guido De Rosso (ITA)	+ 1' 57"
4	Marino Fontana (ITA)	+ 3' 47"
5	Angelino Soler (ESP)	+ 4' 30"
6	Jean-Louis Grunewald (FRA)	+ 7' 01"
7	Giuseppe Sartore (ITA)	+ 7' 13"
8	Joseph Velly (FRA)	+ 8' 13"
9	Walter Villiger (SUI)	+ 9' 49"
10	Guido Carlesi (ITA)	+ 10' 56"
