= Mittelholzer =

Mittelholzer is a surname. Notable people with the surname include:

- Edgar Mittelholzer (1909-1965), Guyanese novelist
- Marianne Mittelholzer (born 1941), better known as Mascha Mioni, Swiss painter and textile artist
- Walter Mittelholzer (1894-1937), Swiss aviation pioneer
