= Ambrogio Portalupi =

Italian cyclist (1943–1987)

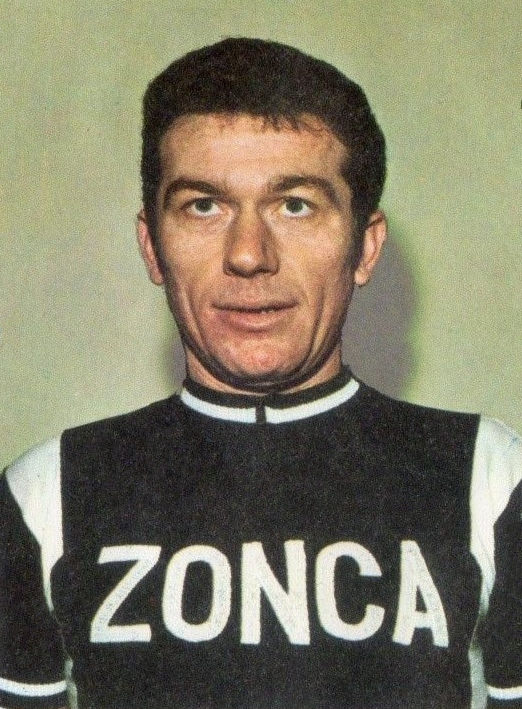
- Ambrogio Portalupi in 1971

Personal information
- Full name: Ambrogio Portalupi
- Born: 25 January 1943 Marcignago, Italy
- Died: 5 January 1987 (aged 43) Pavia, Italy

Cycling career
- Sport: Cycling
- Discipline: Road
- Role: Rider

Professional teams
- 1965: Ignis
- 1966–1967: Vittadello
- 1968: Faema
- 1969–1970: Scic
- 1971: Zonca

Major wins
- Tour de Suisse (1966)

Ambrogio Portalupi (25 January 1943 – 5 January 1987) was an Italian racing cyclist. He won the 1966 Tour de Suisse and rode the Tour de France in 1965, 1967 and 1970.

== Major results ==
1965
3rd Trofeo Matteotti
1966
1st Overall Tour de Suisse

1st Stage 1

1969
1st Stage 2 Tour de Suisse
1st GP Valsassina
