= Louis Pfenninger =

Swiss cyclist (born 1944)

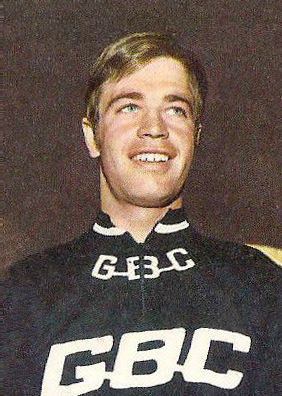

Personal information
- Full name: Louis Pfenninger
- Born: 1 November 1944 (age 81) Bülach, Switzerland
- Height: 1.83 m (6 ft 0 in)
- Weight: 70 kg (154 lb)

Cycling career
- Sport: Cycling
- Disciplines: Road and track
- Role: Rider

Major wins
- Tour de Suisse (1968, 1972)

Louis Pfenninger (born 1 November 1944) is a former Swiss racing cyclist who won the Tour de Suisse in 1968 and 1972. He competed in the individual road race and team time trial events at the 1964 Summer Olympics and rode the Tour de France in 1967. He was the Swiss National Road Race champion in 1971.
