= Kurt Gimmi =

Swiss cyclist (1936–2003)

Personal information
- Full name: Kurt Gimmi
- Born: 13 January 1936 Switzerland
- Died: 29 March 2003 (aged 67)

Cycling career
- Sport: Cycling
- Discipline: Road
- Role: Rider

Major wins
- Tour de France, 1 stage Tour de Romandie (1959)

Kurt Gimmi (13 January 1936 – 29 March 2003) was a Swiss professional road bicycle racer. He was born and died in Zürich and was a professional from 1958 until 1964. He won the eleventh stage of the 1960 Tour de France and the 1959 Tour de Romandie.

== Major results ==
1959
1st, Overall, Tour de Romandie

1st, Stage 1 part b Tour de Romandie, Carouge (SUI)
2nd, Stage 2 Tour de Romandie, Carouge (SUI)

1st, Stage 3a Tour de Suisse

1960
1st, Stage 11 Tour de France
2nd, Overall, Tour de Suisse (SUI)

3rd, Stage 2
2nd, Stage 5

1961
1st, Stage 5 Tour de Suisse

1963
1st, Stage 5 Tour de Suisse
