= Giuseppe Fezzardi =

Italian cyclist

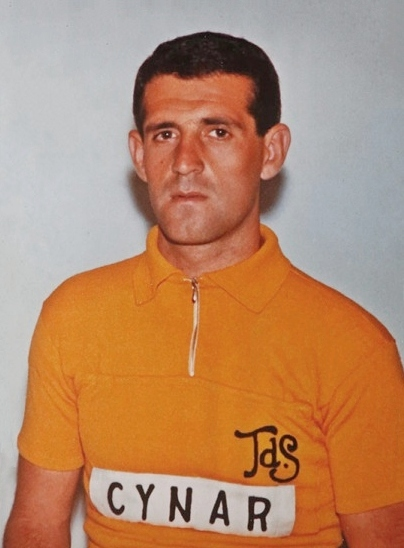
- Fezzardi at the 1963 Tour de Suisse

Personal information
- Full name: Giuseppe Fezzardi
- Born: 28 December 1939 (age 86) Arcisate, Italy

Cycling career
- Sport: Cycling
- Discipline: Road
- Role: Rider

Major wins
- 1 stage 1965 Tour de France

Giuseppe Fezzardi (born 28 December 1939) is a retired Italian professional road bicycle racer, who competed professionally between 1961 and 1972. He won the 1962 Tre Valli Varesine and 1963 Tour de Suisse. Fezzardi rode the 1965 and 1966 Tour de France and won the 15th stage in 1965.
