= Cynar (cycling team) =

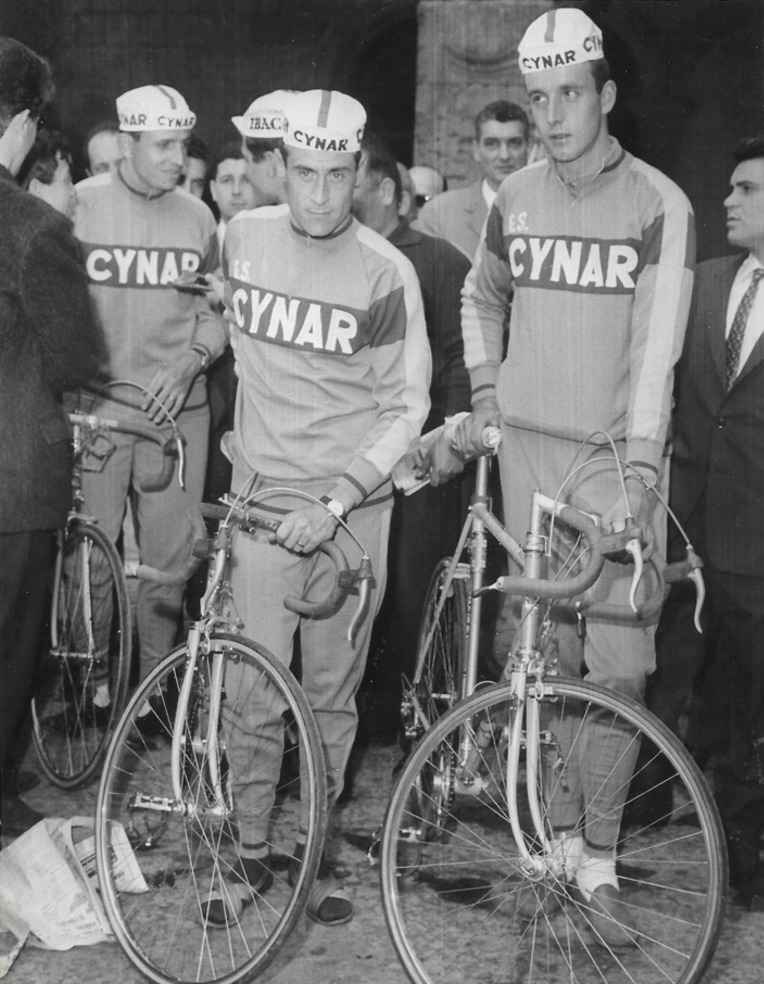
- Ercole Baldini, Attilio Moresi and Roland Zöffel in 1963

Team information
- Registered: Italy
- Founded: 1963
- Disbanded: 1965
- Discipline: Road

Team name history
- 1963–1964 1965: Cynar–Frejus; Cynar–Allegro

Cynar was an Italian professional cycling team that existed from 1963 to 1965. Its main sponsor was Italian liqueur Cynar.
