= Alfred Rüegg =

Swiss cyclist

Personal information
- Full name: Fredy
- Born: 7 May 1934 Zurich, Switzerland
- Died: 26 April 2010 (aged 75) Affoltern am Albis, Switzerland

Cycling career
- Sport: Cycling
- Disciplines: Road and track
- Role: Rider

Major wins
- Tour de Suisse (1960)

Alfred "Fredy" Rüegg (7 May 1934 – 26 April 2010) was a Swiss racing cyclist. He won the 1960 Tour de Suisse. He was the Swiss National Road Race champion in 1967.
