= Robert Hagmann =

Swiss cyclist

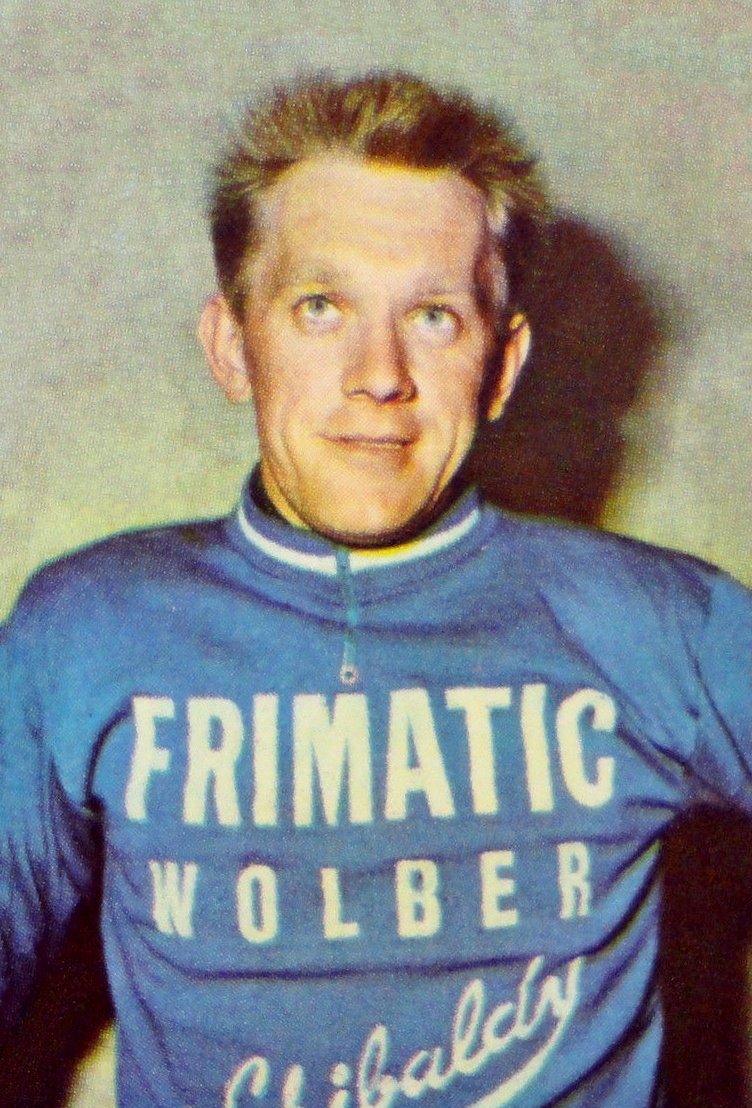
- Robert Hagmann c. 1968

Personal information
- Born: 2 April 1942 (age 84) Zuchwil, Switzerland

Cycling career
- Sport: Cycling
- Role: Rider

Robert Hagmann (born 2 April 1942) is a Swiss former racing cyclist. He was the Swiss National Road Race champion in 1965. He also rode in the 1968 Tour de France.
