= Tigra (cycling team) =

Team information
- Registered: France (1950–1951); Switzerland (1952–1969)
- Founded: 1950
- Disbanded: 1969
- Discipline: Road

Key personnel
- Team managers: Jean de Gribaldy; Erich Grieshaber

Team name history
- 1950–1962 1963–1966 1967 1968 1969: Tigra; Tigra–Meltina; Tigra–Grammont–De Gribaldy; Tigra–Enicar; Tigra

Tigra was a Swiss professional cycling team that existed from 1950 to 1969. Its main sponsor was Swiss bicycle manufacturer Tigra.
