= List of teams and cyclists in the 1969 Giro d'Italia =

The 1969 Giro d'Italia was the 52nd edition of the Giro d'Italia, one of cycling's Grand Tours. The field consisted of 130 riders, and 81 riders finished the race.

== By rider ==
Legend
No.	Starting number worn by the rider during the Giro
Pos.	Position in the general classification
DNF	Denotes a rider who did not finish

No.	Name	Nationality	Team	Ref
1	Eddy Merckx	Belgium	Faema	
2	Martin Van Den Bossche	Belgium	Faema	
3	Victor Van Schil	Belgium	Faema	
4	Guido Reybrouck	Belgium	Faema	
5	Roger Swerts	Belgium	Faema	
6	Guido De Rosso	Italy	Faema	
7	Pietro Scandelli	Italy	Faema	
8	Costantino Conti	Italy	Faema	
9	Lino Farisato	Italy	Faema	
10	Pietro Di Caterina	Italy	Faema	
11	Julio Jiménez	Spain	Eliolona	
12	Siegfried Adler	West Germany	Eliolona	
13	Mario Bettazzoli	Italy	Eliolona	
14	Carlo Brunetti	Italy	Eliolona	
15	Giovanni De Franceschi	Italy	Eliolona	
16	Bernard Vifian	Switzerland	Eliolona	
17	Lucillo Lievore	Italy	Eliolona	
18	Giorgio Mantovani	Italy	Eliolona	
19	Alberto Morellini	Italy	Eliolona	
20	Francesco Plebani	Italy	Eliolona	
21	Albert Van Vlierberghe	Belgium	Ferretti	
22	Carlo Viviani	Italy	Ferretti	
23	Julien Van Lint	Belgium	Ferretti	
24	Romano Tumellero	Italy	Ferretti	
25	Silvano Davo	Italy	Ferretti	
26	Giuseppe Bratzu	Italy	Ferretti	
27	Luigi Roncaglia	Italy	Ferretti	
28	Alberto Rossetto	Italy	Ferretti	
29	Renato Rota	Italy	Ferretti	
30	Leopoldo Cattelan	Italy	Ferretti	
31	Franco Bitossi	Italy	Filotex	
32	Italo Zilioli	Italy	Filotex	
33	Marcello Bergamo	Italy	Filotex	
34	Ugo Colombo	Italy	Filotex	
35	Alberto Della Torre	Italy	Filotex	
36	Giorgio Favaro	Italy	Filotex	
37	Giuseppe Grassi	Italy	Filotex	
38	Adriano Passuello	Italy	Filotex	
39	Alfio Poli	Italy	Filotex	
40	Flaviano Vicentini	Italy	Filotex	
41	Roberto Ballini	Italy	G.B.C.	
42	Renzo Baldan	Italy	G.B.C.	
43	Damiano Capodivento	Italy	G.B.C.	
44	Giorgio Destro	Italy	G.B.C.	
45	Luciano Luciani	Italy	G.B.C.	
46	Imerio Massignan	Italy	G.B.C.	
47	Aldo Moser	Italy	G.B.C.	
48	Rolf Maurer	Switzerland	G.B.C.	
49	Dieter Puschel	West Germany	G.B.C.	
50	Willy Spuhler	Switzerland	G.B.C.	
51	Vito Taccone	Italy	Germanvox–Wega	
52	Antonio Paolo Albonetti	Italy	Germanvox–Wega	
53	Primo Franchini	Italy	Germanvox–Wega	
54	Renato Laghi	Italy	Germanvox–Wega	
55	Vicenzo Mantovani	Italy	Germanvox–Wega	
56	Giuseppe Milioli	Italy	Germanvox–Wega	
57	Rino Montanari	Italy	Germanvox–Wega	
58	Ivan Pierozzi	Italy	Germanvox–Wega	
59	Giancarlo Toschi	Italy	Germanvox–Wega	
60	Ole Ritter	Denmark	Germanvox–Wega	
61	Gianfranco Bianchin	Italy	Gris 2000	
62	Giovanni Bramucci	Italy	Gris 2000	
63	Giovanni Cavalcanti	Italy	Gris 2000	
64	Angelo Corti	Italy	Gris 2000	
65	Amedeo Gattafoni	Italy	Gris 2000	
66	Flavio Martini	Italy	Gris 2000	
67	Francesco Menghi	Italy	Gris 2000	
68	Benito Pigato	Italy	Gris 2000	
69	Sandro Quintarelli	Italy	Gris 2000	
70	Giancarlo Tartoni	Italy	Gris 2000	
71	Giampaolo Cucchieti	Italy	Max Meyer	
72	Ercole Gualazzini	Italy	Max Meyer	
73	Claudio Michelotto	Italy	Max Meyer	
74	Primo Mori	Italy	Max Meyer	
75	Maurizio Malagutti	Italy	Max Meyer	
76	Guido Neri	Italy	Max Meyer	
77	Felice Salina	Italy	Max Meyer	
78	Luigi Sgarbozza	Italy	Max Meyer	
79	Giuseppe Scopel	Italy	Max Meyer	
80	Pietro Tamiazzo	Italy	Max Meyer	
81	Michele Dancelli	Italy	Molteni	
82	Marino Basso	Italy	Molteni	
83	Guerrino Tosello	Italy	Molteni	
84	Giancarlo Polidori	Italy	Molteni	
85	Edy Schütz	Luxembourg	Molteni	
86	Mario Anni	Italy	Molteni	
87	Giacinto Santambrogio	Italy	Molteni	
88	Enrico Maggioni	Italy	Molteni	
89	Davide Boifava	Italy	Molteni	
90	Arturo Pecchielan	Italy	Molteni	
91	Aldo Balasso	Italy	Sagit	
92	Lorenzo Carminati	Italy	Sagit	
93	Antonio Carniel	Italy	Sagit	
94	Franco Cortinovis	Italy	Sagit	
95	Ernesto Donghi	Italy	Sagit	
96	Gabriele Gazzetta	Italy	Sagit	
97	Virgilio Levati	Italy	Sagit	
98	Oliviero Morotti	Italy	Sagit	
99	Wladimiro Palazzi	Italy	Sagit	
100	Franco Vanzin	Italy	Sagit	
101	Rudi Altig	West Germany	Salvarani	
102	Franco Bodrero	Italy	Salvarani	
103	Lino Carletto	Italy	Salvarani	
104	Luciano Dalla Bona	Italy	Salvarani	
105	Tommaso de Pra	Italy	Salvarani	
106	Giancarlo Ferretti	Italy	Salvarani	
107	Felice Gimondi	Italy	Salvarani	
108	Wladimiro Panizza	Italy	Salvarani	
109	Roberto Poggiali	Italy	Salvarani	
110	Dino Zandegù	Italy	Salvarani	
111	Silvano Schiavon	Italy	Sanson	
112	Carlo Chiappano	Italy	Sanson	
113	Ottavio Crepaldi	Italy	Sanson	
114	Matteo Cravero	Italy	Sanson	
115	Pietro Campagnari	Italy	Sanson	
116	Vittorio Marcelli	Italy	Sanson	
117	Giuseppe Fezzardi	Italy	Sanson	
118	Attilio Rota	Italy	Sanson	
119	Franco Mori	Italy	Sanson	
120	Celestino Vercelli	Italy	Sanson	
121	Vittorio Adorni	Italy	Scic	
122	Luciano Armani	Italy	Scic	
123	Attilio Benfatto	Italy	Scic	
124	Emilio Casalini	Italy	Scic	
125	Ernesto Jotti	Italy	Scic	
126	Enrico Paolini	Italy	Scic	
127	Bruno Mealli	Italy	Scic	
128	Adriano Durante	Italy	Scic	
129	Ambrogio Portalupi	Italy	Scic	
130	Pierino Primavera	Italy	Scic	
