= List of teams and cyclists in the 1970 Giro d'Italia =

The 1970 Giro d'Italia was the 53rd edition of the Giro d'Italia, one of cycling's Grand Tours. The field consisted of 130 riders, and 97 riders finished the race.

== By rider ==
Legend
No.	Starting number worn by the rider during the Giro
Pos.	Position in the general classification
DNF	Denotes a rider who did not finish

No.	Name	Nationality	Team	Ref
1	Felice Gimondi	Italy	Salvarani	
2	Franco Balmamion	Italy	Salvarani	
3	Giovanni Cavalcanti	Italy	Salvarani	
4	Walter Godefroot	Belgium	Salvarani	
5	Ercole Gualazzini	Italy	Salvarani	
6	Antoine Houbrechts	Belgium	Salvarani	
7	Wladimiro Panizza	Italy	Salvarani	
8	Roberto Poggiali	Italy	Salvarani	
9	Silvano Schiavon	Italy	Salvarani	
10	Dino Zandegù	Italy	Salvarani	
11	Vito Taccone	Italy	Cosatto	
12	Adriano Amici	Italy	Cosatto	
13	Domenico De Marco	Italy	Cosatto	
14	Pietro Dallai	Italy	Cosatto	
15	Giuseppe De Simone	Italy	Cosatto	
16	Primo Franchini	Italy	Cosatto	
17	Flavio Martini	Italy	Cosatto	
18	Stefanino Mezzetti	Italy	Cosatto	
19	Emilio Santantonio	Italy	Cosatto	
20	Sandro Quintarelli	Italy	Cosatto	
21	Patrick Sercu	Belgium	Dreher	
22	Roberto Ballini	Italy	Dreher	
23	Renzo Baldan	Italy	Dreher	
24	Giuseppe Fezzardi	Italy	Dreher	
25	Bernard Van de Kerckhove	Belgium	Dreher	
26	Gian-Piero Macchi	Italy	Dreher	
27	Adriano Passuello	Italy	Dreher	
28	Attilio Rota	Italy	Dreher	
29	Luigi Sgarbozza	Italy	Dreher	
30	Luciano Soave	Italy	Dreher	
31	Pietro Campagnari	Italy	Faemino–Faema	
32	Lino Farisato	Italy	Faemino–Faema	
33	Jos Huysmans	Belgium	Faemino–Faema	
34	Eddy Merckx	Belgium	Faemino–Faema	
35	Frans Mintjens	Belgium	Faemino–Faema	
36	Jozef Spruyt	Belgium	Faemino–Faema	
37	Roger Swerts	Belgium	Faemino–Faema	
38	Georges Vandenberghe	Belgium	Faemino–Faema	
39	Victor Van Schil	Belgium	Faemino–Faema	
40	Italo Zilioli	Italy	Faemino–Faema	
41	Gösta Pettersson	Sweden	Ferretti	
42	Eraldo Bocci	Italy	Ferretti	
43	Giampaolo Cucchietti	Italy	Ferretti	
44	Enrico Maggioni	Italy	Ferretti	
45	Sture Pettersson	Sweden	Ferretti	
46	Mauro Simonetti	Italy	Ferretti	
47	Romano Tumellero	Italy	Ferretti	
48	Albert Van Vlierberghe	Belgium	Ferretti	
49	Wilmo Francioni	Italy	Ferretti	
50	Renato Rota	Italy	Ferretti	
51	Franco Bitossi	Italy	Filotex	
52	Marcello Bergamo	Italy	Filotex	
53	Ugo Colombo	Italy	Filotex	
54	Arnaldo Caverzasi	Italy	Filotex	
55	Alberto Della Torre	Italy	Filotex	
56	Fabrizio Fabbri	Italy	Filotex	
57	Giuseppe Grassi	Italy	Filotex	
58	Giuseppe Rosolen	Italy	Filotex	
59	Vittorio Urbani	Italy	Filotex	
60	Alfio Poli	Italy	Filotex	
61	Rudi Altig	West Germany	G.B.C.	
62	Aldo Moser	Italy	G.B.C.	
63	Diego Moser	Italy	G.B.C.	
64	Luciano Luciani	Italy	G.B.C.	
65	Wilfried Peffgen	West Germany	G.B.C.	
66	Dieter Puschel	West Germany	G.B.C.	
67	Louis Pfenninger	Switzerland	G.B.C.	
68	Auguste Girard	Italy	G.B.C.	
69	Erwin Thalmann	Switzerland	G.B.C.	
70	Kurt Rub	Switzerland	G.B.C.	
71	Ole Ritter	Denmark	Germanvox	
72	Guido Reybrouck	Belgium	Germanvox	
73	Julien Van Lint	Belgium	Germanvox	
74	Paul In 't Ven	Belgium	Germanvox	
75	Giovanni Bramucci	Italy	Germanvox	
76	Angelo Bassini	Italy	Germanvox	
77	Giuseppe Milioli	Italy	Germanvox	
78	Bruno Lana	Italy	Germanvox	
79	Adriano Pella	Italy	Germanvox	
80	Celestino Vercelli	Italy	Germanvox	
81	Enrique Cifuentes	Spain	La Casera	
82	Sebastian Fernandez Duenas	Spain	La Casera	
83	Joaquim Galera	Spain	La Casera	
84	Manuel Galera	Spain	La Casera	
85	José Manuel Lasa	Spain	La Casera	
86	Miguel María Lasa	Spain	La Casera	
87	José Manuel López	Spain	La Casera	
88	Jorge Mariné	Spain	La Casera	
89	José Antonio Pontón Ruiz	Spain	La Casera	
90	Enrique Sahagún	Spain	La Casera	
91	Sigfrido Fontanelli	Italy	Magniflex	
92	Mauro Vannucchi	Italy	Magniflex	
93	Emile Cambre	Belgium	Magniflex	
94	Ernie De Blaere	Belgium	Magniflex	
95	Willy De Geest	Belgium	Magniflex	
96	Jean Ronsmans	Belgium	Magniflex	
97	Noël Van Clooster	Belgium	Magniflex	
98	Willy Vekemans	Belgium	Magniflex	
99	Marc De Block	Belgium	Magniflex	
100	Herman Flabat	Belgium	Magniflex	
101	Marino Basso	Italy	Molteni	
102	Gianfranco Bianchin	Italy	Molteni	
103	Luigi Castelletti	Italy	Molteni	
104	Carlo Chiappano	Italy	Molteni	
105	Michele Dancelli	Italy	Molteni	
106	Franco Mori	Italy	Molteni	
107	Giacinto Santambrogio	Italy	Molteni	
108	Guerrino Tosello	Italy	Molteni	
109	Martin Van Den Bossche	Belgium	Molteni	
110	Pierfranco Vianelli	Italy	Molteni	
111	Aldo Balasso	Italy	Sagit	
112	Ernesto Donghi	Italy	Sagit	
113	Giuseppe Fantini	Italy	Sagit	
114	Giorgio Favaro	Italy	Sagit	
115	Renato Laghi	Italy	Sagit	
116	Virgino Levati	Italy	Sagit	
117	Oliviero Morotti	Italy	Sagit	
118	Luigi Borghetti	Italy	Sagit	
119	Felice Salina	Italy	Sagit	
120	Roberto Sorlini	Italy	Sagit	
121	Vittorio Adorni	Italy	Scic	
122	Luciano Armani	Italy	Scic	
123	Attilio Benfatto	Italy	Scic	
124	Mino Denti	Italy	Scic	
125	Adriano Durante	Italy	Scic	
126	Claudio Michelotto	Italy	Scic	
127	Guido Neri	Italy	Scic	
128	Enrico Paolini	Italy	Scic	
129	Giancarlo Polidori	Italy	Scic	
130	Ambrogio Portalupi	Italy	Scic	
