= List of teams and cyclists in the 1972 Giro d'Italia =

The 1972 Giro d'Italia was the 55th edition of the Giro d'Italia, one of cycling's Grand Tours. The field consisted of 100 riders, and 69 riders finished the race.

== By rider ==
Legend
No.	Starting number worn by the rider during the Giro
Pos.	Position in the general classification
DNF	Denotes a rider who did not finish

No.	Name	Nationality	Team	Ref
1	Gösta Pettersson	Sweden	Ferretti	
2	Mario Anni	Italy	Ferretti	
3	Ottavio Crepaldi	Italy	Ferretti	
4	Lino Farisato	Italy	Ferretti	
5	Giorgio Favaro	Italy	Ferretti	
6	Wilmo Francioni	Italy	Ferretti	
7	Gianni Motta	Italy	Ferretti	
8	Tomas Pettersson	Sweden	Ferretti	
9	Mauro Simonetti	Italy	Ferretti	
10	Albert Van Vlierberghe	Belgium	Ferretti	
11	Roger De Vlaeminck	Belgium	Dreher	
12	Patrick Sercu	Belgium	Dreher	
13	Pierfranco Vianelli	Italy	Dreher	
14	Enrico Maggioni	Italy	Dreher	
15	Romano Tumellero	Italy	Dreher	
16	Ole Ritter	Denmark	Dreher	
17	Adriano Passuello	Italy	Dreher	
18	Attilio Rota	Italy	Dreher	
19	Arturo Pecchielan	Italy	Dreher	
20	Julien Stevens	Belgium	Dreher	
21	Franco Bitossi	Italy	Filotex	
22	Marcello Bergamo	Italy	Filotex	
23	Giovanni Cavalcanti	Italy	Filotex	
24	Arnaldo Caverzasi	Italy	Filotex	
25	Ugo Colombo	Italy	Filotex	
26	Vittorio Cumino	Italy	Filotex	
27	Josef Fuchs	Switzerland	Filotex	
28	Donato Giuliani	Italy	Filotex	
29	Renato Laghi	Italy	Filotex	
30	Piero Spinelli	Italy	Filotex	
31	Aldo Moser	Italy	G.B.C.–Sony	
32	Claudio Michelotto	Italy	G.B.C.–Sony	
33	Dino Zandegù	Italy	G.B.C.–Sony	
34	Silvano Schiavon	Italy	G.B.C.–Sony	
35	Diego Moser	Italy	G.B.C.–Sony	
36	Silvano Davo	Italy	G.B.C.–Sony	
37	Mario Lanzafame	Italy	G.B.C.–Sony	
38	Erich Spahn	Switzerland	G.B.C.–Sony	
39	Jurg Schneider	Switzerland	G.B.C.–Sony	
40	Edi Schneider	Switzerland	G.B.C.–Sony	
41	José Manuel Fuente	Spain	Kas–Kaskol	
42	José Antonio González	Spain	Kas–Kaskol	
43	Miguel María Lasa	Spain	Kas–Kaskol	
44	Santiago Lazcano	Spain	Kas–Kaskol	
45	Vicente López Carril	Spain	Kas–Kaskol	
46	Jesús Manzaneque	Spain	Kas–Kaskol	
47	Domingo Perurena	Spain	Kas–Kaskol	
48	Francisco Galdós	Spain	Kas–Kaskol	
49	José Pesarrodona	Spain	Kas–Kaskol	
50	Francisco-Javier Galdeano	Spain	Kas–Kaskol	
51	Georges Pintens	Belgium	Van Cauter–Magniflex–de Gribaldy	
52	Fabrizio Fabbri	Italy	Van Cauter–Magniflex–de Gribaldy	
53	Vittorio Urbani	Italy	Van Cauter–Magniflex–de Gribaldy	
54	Pietro Dallai	Italy	Van Cauter–Magniflex–de Gribaldy	
55	Silvano Ravagli	Italy	Van Cauter–Magniflex–de Gribaldy	
56	Mauro Vannucchi	Italy	Van Cauter–Magniflex–de Gribaldy	
57	Alberto Tazzi	Italy	Van Cauter–Magniflex–de Gribaldy	
58	André Poppe	Belgium	Van Cauter–Magniflex–de Gribaldy	
59	Willy De Geest	Belgium	Van Cauter–Magniflex–de Gribaldy	
60	Ludo Van Staeyen	Belgium	Van Cauter–Magniflex–de Gribaldy	
61	Eddy Merckx	Belgium	Molteni	
62	Giancarlo Bellini	Italy	Molteni	
63	Joseph Bruyère	Belgium	Molteni	
64	Jos Deschoenmaecker	Belgium	Molteni	
65	Jos Huysmans	Belgium	Molteni	
66	Frans Mintjens	Belgium	Molteni	
67	Jozef Spruyt	Belgium	Molteni	
68	Roger Swerts	Belgium	Molteni	
69	Martin Van Den Bossche	Belgium	Molteni	
70	Victor Van Schil	Belgium	Molteni	
71	Marino Basso	Italy	Salvarani	
72	Pietro Campagnari	Italy	Salvarani	
73	Emilio Casalini	Italy	Salvarani	
74	Felice Gimondi	Italy	Salvarani	
75	Pietro Guerra	Italy	Salvarani	
76	Antoine Houbrechts	Belgium	Salvarani	
77	Roberto Poggiali	Italy	Salvarani	
78	Giacinto Santambrogio	Italy	Salvarani	
79	Guerrino Tosello	Italy	Salvarani	
80	Italo Zilioli	Italy	Salvarani	
81	Luciano Armani	Italy	Scic	
82	Franco Balmamion	Italy	Scic	
83	Angelo Bassini	Italy	Scic	
84	Attilio Benfatto	Italy	Scic	
85	Carlo Chiappano	Italy	Scic	
86	Michele Dancelli	Italy	Scic	
87	Franco Mori	Italy	Scic	
88	Enrico Paolini	Italy	Scic	
89	Giancarlo Polidori	Italy	Scic	
90	Celestino Vercelli	Italy	Scic	
91	Davide Boifava	Italy	Zonca	
92	Sandro Cammilli	Italy	Zonca	
93	Virginio Levati	Italy	Zonca	
94	Wladimiro Panizza	Italy	Zonca	
95	Giuseppe Perletto	Italy	Zonca	
96	Roberto Sorlini	Italy	Zonca	
97	Pietro Tamiazzo	Italy	Zonca	
98	Giovanni Varini	Italy	Zonca	
99	Louis Pfenninger	Switzerland	Zonca	
100	Kurt Rub	Switzerland	Zonca	
