= List of teams and cyclists in the 1975 Giro d'Italia =

The 1975 Giro d'Italia was the 58th edition of the Giro d'Italia, one of cycling's Grand Tours. The field consisted of 90 riders, and 70 riders finished the race.

== By rider ==
Legend
No.	Starting number worn by the rider during the Giro
Pos.	Position in the general classification
DNF	Denotes a rider who did not finish

No.	Name	Nationality	Team	Ref
11	Felice Gimondi	Italy	Bianchi–Campagnolo	
12	Rik Van Linden	Belgium	Bianchi–Campagnolo	
13	Luigi Castelletti	Italy	Bianchi–Campagnolo	
14	Giovanni Cavalcanti	Italy	Bianchi–Campagnolo	
15	Fabrizio Fabbri	Italy	Bianchi–Campagnolo	
16	Simone Fraccaro	Italy	Bianchi–Campagnolo	
17	Antoine Houbrechts	Belgium	Bianchi–Campagnolo	
18	Emilio-Martin Rodriguez	Colombia	Bianchi–Campagnolo	
19	Giacinto Santambrogio	Italy	Bianchi–Campagnolo	
20	Alex Van Linden	Belgium	Bianchi–Campagnolo	
21	Roger De Vlaeminck	Belgium	Brooklyn	
22	Wladimiro Panizza	Italy	Brooklyn	
23	Patrick Sercu	Belgium	Brooklyn	
24	Giancarlo Bellini	Italy	Brooklyn	
25	Willy De Geest	Belgium	Brooklyn	
26	Ercole Gualazzini	Italy	Brooklyn	
27	Valerio Lualdi	Italy	Brooklyn	
28	Marcello Osler	Italy	Brooklyn	
29	Herman Van der Slagmolen	Belgium	Brooklyn	
30	Aldo Parecchini	Italy	Brooklyn	
31	Davide Boifava	Italy	Furzi	
32	Claudio Bonacina	Italy	Furzi	
33	Alfredo Chinetti	Italy	Furzi	
34	Costantino Conti	Italy	Furzi	
35	Mario Lanzafame	Italy	Furzi	
36	Giorgio Favaro	Italy	Furzi	
37	Arturo Pecchielan	Italy	Furzi	
38	Giancarlo Polidori	Italy	Furzi	
39	Giuseppe Rodella	Italy	Furzi	
40	Giancarlo Tartoni	Italy	Furzi	
41	Henk Poppe	Netherlands	Frisol–G.B.C.	
42	Theo Smit	Netherlands	Frisol–G.B.C.	
43	Ronny De Bisschop	Belgium	Frisol–G.B.C.	
44	Cees van Dongen	Netherlands	Frisol–G.B.C.	
45	Wilfried Reybrouck	Belgium	Frisol–G.B.C.	
46	Etienne Van Braekel	Belgium	Frisol–G.B.C.	
47	Gerard Kamper	Netherlands	Frisol–G.B.C.	
48	Fedor den Hertog	Netherlands	Frisol–G.B.C.	
49	Nidie Den Hertog	Netherlands	Frisol–G.B.C.	
50	Henk Prinsen	Netherlands	Frisol–G.B.C.	
51	Alessio Antonini	Italy	Jollj Ceramica	
52	Giovanni Battaglin	Italy	Jollj Ceramica	
53	Giacomo Bazzan	Italy	Jollj Ceramica	
54	Marcello Bergamo	Italy	Jollj Ceramica	
55	Fausto Bertoglio	Italy	Jollj Ceramica	
56	Pierino Gavazzi	Italy	Jollj Ceramica	
57	Donato Giuliani	Italy	Jollj Ceramica	
58	Knut Knudsen	Norway	Jollj Ceramica	
59	Sandro Quintarelli	Italy	Jollj Ceramica	
60	Bruno Vicino	Italy	Jollj Ceramica	
61	Miguel María Lasa	Spain	Kas–Kaskol	
62	Domingo Perurena	Spain	Kas–Kaskol	
63	Francisco Galdós	Spain	Kas–Kaskol	
64	Vicente López Carril	Spain	Kas–Kaskol	
65	José Antonio González	Spain	Kas–Kaskol	
66	Andrés Oliva	Spain	Kas–Kaskol	
67	Javier Elorriaga	Spain	Kas–Kaskol	
68	Sebastián Pozo	Spain	Kas–Kaskol	
69	Juan Zurano	Spain	Kas–Kaskol	
70	José Grande	Spain	Kas–Kaskol	
71	Marino Basso	Italy	Magniflex	
72	Bruce Biddle	New Zealand	Magniflex	
73	Mario Branchi	Italy	Magniflex	
74	Ottavio Crepaldi	Italy	Magniflex	
75	Wilmo Francioni	Italy	Magniflex	
76	Armando Lora	Italy	Magniflex	
77	Mauro Vannucchi	Italy	Magniflex	
78	Giuseppe Perletto	Italy	Magniflex	
79	Glauco Santoni	Italy	Magniflex	
80	Italo Zilioli	Italy	Magniflex	
81	Gaetano Baronchelli	Italy	Scic	
82	Gianbattista Baronchelli	Italy	Scic	
83	Franco Bitossi	Italy	Scic	
84	Luciano Conati	Italy	Scic	
85	Renato Laghi	Italy	Scic	
86	Primo Mori	Italy	Scic	
87	Enrico Paolini	Italy	Scic	
88	Walter Riccomi	Italy	Scic	
89	Attilio Rota	Italy	Scic	
90	Celestino Vercelli	Italy	Scic	
91	Luciano Borgognoni	Italy	Zonca–Santini	
92	Alberto Caiumi	Italy	Zonca–Santini	
93	Francesco Calvi	Italy	Zonca–Santini	
94	Gianni Di Lorenzo	Italy	Zonca–Santini	
95	Enrico Guadrini	Italy	Zonca–Santini	
96	Adriano Pella	Italy	Zonca–Santini	
97	Louis Pfenninger	Switzerland	Zonca–Santini	
98	Pasquale Pugliese	Italy	Zonca–Santini	
99	Roland Salm	Switzerland	Zonca–Santini	
100	Luigi Venturato	Italy	Zonca–Santini	
