= 1971 Giro d'Italia, Prologue to Stage 10 =

Cycling race stages

The 1971 Giro d'Italia was the 54th edition of the Giro d'Italia, one of cycling's Grand Tours. The Giro began with a prologue team time trial in Lecce on 20 May, and Stage 10 occurred on 30 May with a stage to Pian del Falco di Sestola. The race finished in Milan on 10 June.

== Prologue ==
20 May 1971 — Lecce to Brindisi, 62.2 km (38.6 mi) (TTT)

Prologue result

Rank	Team	Time
1	Salvarani	1h 10' 48"
2	Molteni	+ 3"
3	Scic	+ 34"
4	Ferretti	+ 52"
5	Filotex	+ 1' 39"
6	Dreher	+ 2' 15"
7	G.B.C.	+ 2' 29"
8	Hertekamp–Magniflex	+ 3' 24"
9	Cosatto	+ 11' 33"
10	Kas–Kaskol	+ 12' 00"

== Stage 1 ==
21 May 1971 — Brindisi to Bari, 175 km (109 mi)

Stage 1 result and general classification after Stage 1

Rank	Rider	Team	Time
1	Marino Basso (ITA)	Molteni	4h 02' 42"
2	Franco Bitossi (ITA)	Filotex	s.t.
3	Gianni Motta (ITA)	Salvarani	s.t.
4	Primo Mori (ITA)	Salvarani	s.t.
5	Albert Van Vlierberghe (BEL)	Ferretti	s.t.
6	Alberto Della Torre (ITA)	Filotex	s.t.
7	Michele Dancelli (ITA)	Scic	s.t.
8	Giancarlo Polidori (ITA)	Scic	s.t.
9	Cipriano Chemello (ITA)	Cosatto	s.t.
10	Ole Ritter (DEN)	Dreher	s.t.

== Stage 2 ==
22 May 1971 — Bari to Potenza, 260 km (160 mi)

Stage 2 result

Rank	Rider	Team	Time
1	Enrico Paolini (ITA)	Scic	7h 55' 29"
2	Gianni Motta (ITA)	Salvarani	+ 3"
3	Michele Dancelli (ITA)	Scic	+ 14"
4	Gösta Pettersson (SWE)	Ferretti	s.t.
5	Franco Bitossi (ITA)	Filotex	s.t.
6	Giancarlo Polidori (ITA)	Scic	+ 2' 44"
7	Italo Zilioli (ITA)	Ferretti	s.t.
8	Herman Van Springel (BEL)	Molteni	s.t.
9	Franco Balmamion (ITA)	Scic	s.t.
10	Aldo Moser (ITA)	G.B.C.	s.t.

General classification after Stage 2

Rank	Rider	Team	Time
1	Enrico Paolini (ITA)	Scic	11h 58' 11"
2	Gianni Motta (ITA)	Salvarani	+ 3"
3	Michele Dancelli (ITA)	Scic	+ 14"
4	Gösta Pettersson (SWE)	Ferretti	s.t.
5	Franco Bitossi (ITA)	Filotex	s.t.
6	Giancarlo Polidori (ITA)	Scic	+ 2' 46"
7	Aldo Moser (ITA)	G.B.C.	s.t.
8	Italo Zilioli (ITA)	Ferretti	s.t.
9	Ugo Colombo (ITA)	Filotex	s.t.
10	Wladimiro Panizza (ITA)	Cosatto	s.t.

== Stage 3 ==
23 May 1971 — Potenza to Benevento, 177 km (110 mi)

Stage 3 result

Rank	Rider	Team	Time
1	Ercole Gualazzini (ITA)	Salvarani	5h 05' 23"
2	Patrick Sercu (BEL)	Dreher	s.t.
3	Marino Basso (ITA)	Molteni	s.t.
4	Pietro Guerra (ITA)	Salvarani	s.t.
5	Albert Van Vlierberghe (BEL)	Ferretti	s.t.
6	Luigi Sgarbozza (ITA)	G.B.C.	s.t.
7	Gianni Motta (ITA)	Salvarani	s.t.
8	Giancarlo Polidori (ITA)	Scic	s.t.
9	Enrico Paolini (ITA)	Scic	s.t.
10	Franco Bitossi (ITA)	Filotex	s.t.

General classification after Stage 3

Rank	Rider	Team	Time
1	Enrico Paolini (ITA)	Scic	17h 03' 34"
2	Gianni Motta (ITA)	Salvarani	+ 3"
3	Franco Bitossi (ITA)	Filotex	+ 14"
4	Michele Dancelli (ITA)	Scic	s.t.
5	Gösta Pettersson (SWE)	Ferretti	s.t.
6	Giancarlo Polidori (ITA)	Scic	+ 2' 44"
7	Aldo Moser (ITA)	G.B.C.	s.t.
8	Italo Zilioli (ITA)	Ferretti	s.t.
9	Ugo Colombo (ITA)	Filotex	s.t.
10	Wladimiro Panizza (ITA)	Cosatto	s.t.

== Stage 4 ==
24 May 1971 — Benevento to Pescasseroli, 203 km (126 mi)

Stage 4 result

Rank	Rider	Team	Time
1	Guerrino Tosello (ITA)	Molteni	6h 22' 50"
2	Roberto Sorlini (ITA)	Cosatto	s.t.
3	Ole Ritter (DEN)	Dreher	+ 3' 39"
4	Donato Giuliani (ITA)	Filotex	s.t.
5	José Luis Uribezubia (ESP)	Kas–Kaskol	s.t.
6	Wladimiro Panizza (ITA)	Cosatto	s.t.
7	Ugo Colombo (ITA)	Filotex	+ 3' 46"
8	Antoine Houbrechts (BEL)	Salvarani	+ 3' 50"
9	Marino Basso (ITA)	Molteni	+ 4' 01"
10	Gianni Motta (ITA)	Salvarani	s.t.

General classification after Stage 4

Rank	Rider	Team	Time
1	Enrico Paolini (ITA)	Scic	23h 50' 25"
2	Gianni Motta (ITA)	Salvarani	+ 3"
3	Franco Bitossi (ITA)	Filotex	+ 14"
4	Michele Dancelli (ITA)	Scic	s.t.
5	Gösta Pettersson (SWE)	Ferretti	s.t.
6	Wladimiro Panizza (ITA)	Cosatto	+ 2' 22"
7	Ugo Colombo (ITA)	Filotex	+ 2' 29"
8	Giancarlo Polidori (ITA)	Scic	+ 2' 44"
9	Aldo Moser (ITA)	G.B.C.	s.t.
10	Italo Zilioli (ITA)	Ferretti	s.t.

== Stage 5 ==
25 May 1971 — Pescasseroli to Gran Sasso d'Italia, 198 km (123 mi)

Stage 5 result

Rank	Rider	Team	Time
1	Vicente López Carril (ESP)	Kas–Kaskol	6h 09' 40"
2	Antoine Houbrechts (BEL)	Salvarani	+ 4"
3	Pierfranco Vianelli (ITA)	Dreher	+ 29"
4	Ole Ritter (DEN)	Dreher	+ 41"
5	Roger Swerts (BEL)	Molteni	+ 50"
6	Claudio Michelotto (ITA)	Scic	+ 57"
7	Erik Pettersson (SWE)	Ferretti	+ 1' 02"
8	Aldo Moser (ITA)	G.B.C.	s.t.
9	Ugo Colombo (ITA)	Filotex	s.t.
10	Donato Giuliani (ITA)	Filotex	+ 1' 10"

General classification after Stage 5

Rank	Rider	Team	Time
1	Ugo Colombo (ITA)	Filotex	29h 43' 36"
2	Aldo Moser (ITA)	G.B.C.	+ 15"
3	Claudio Michelotto (ITA)	Scic	+ 52"
4	Silvano Schiavon (ITA)	Dreher	+ 1' 17"
5	Giancarlo Polidori (ITA)	Scic	+ 4' 45"
6	Antoine Houbrechts (BEL)	Salvarani	+ 5' 02"
7	Pierfranco Vianelli (ITA)	Dreher	+ 5' 38"
8	Enrico Paolini (ITA)	Scic	+ 5' 47"
9	Donato Giuliani (ITA)	Filotex	+ 5' 57"
10	Gianni Motta (ITA)	Salvarani	+ 6' 42"

== Stage 6 ==
26 May 1971 — L'Aquila to Orvieto, 163 km (101 mi)

Stage 6 result

Rank	Rider	Team	Time
1	Domingo Perurena (ESP)	Kas–Kaskol	3h 58' 45"
2	Lino Farisato (ITA)	Ferretti	+ 1"
3	Arturo Pecchielan (ITA)	G.B.C.	s.t.
4	Dino Zandegù (ITA)	Salvarani	+ 9"
5	Albert Van Vlierberghe (BEL)	Ferretti	s.t.
6	Giancarlo Polidori (ITA)	Scic	s.t.
7	Patrick Sercu (BEL)	Dreher	s.t.
8	Erik Pettersson (SWE)	Ferretti	s.t.
9	Mario Lanzafame (ITA)	Cosatto	s.t.
10	Primo Mori (ITA)	Salvarani	s.t.

General classification after Stage 6

Rank	Rider	Team	Time
1	Ugo Colombo (ITA)	Filotex	33h 44' 49"
2	Aldo Moser (ITA)	G.B.C.	+ 15"
3	Claudio Michelotto (ITA)	Scic	+ 52"
4	Silvano Schiavon (ITA)	Dreher	+ 1' 17"
5	Giancarlo Polidori (ITA)	Scic	+ 2' 26"
6	Antoine Houbrechts (BEL)	Salvarani	+ 5' 02"
7	Pierfranco Vianelli (ITA)	Dreher	+ 5' 38"
8	Enrico Paolini (ITA)	Scic	+ 5' 47"
9	Donato Giuliani (ITA)	Filotex	+ 5' 57"
10	Franco Bitossi (ITA)	Filotex	+ 6' 37"

== Stage 7 ==
27 May 1971 — Orvieto to San Vincenzo, 220 km (140 mi)

Stage 7 result

Rank	Rider	Team	Time
1	Felice Gimondi (ITA)	Salvarani	5h 22' 22"
2	Marinus Wagtmans (NED)	Molteni	s.t.
3	Wladimiro Panizza (ITA)	Cosatto	s.t.
4	Enrico Paolini (ITA)	Scic	s.t.
5	Francisco Galdós (ESP)	Kas–Kaskol	s.t.
6	Gösta Pettersson (SWE)	Ferretti	s.t.
7	Herman Van Springel (BEL)	Molteni	s.t.
8	Claudio Michelotto (ITA)	Scic	s.t.
9	Aldo Moser (ITA)	G.B.C.	s.t.
10	Romano Tumellero (ITA)	Molteni	+ 6' 22"

General classification after Stage 7

Rank	Rider	Team	Time
1	Aldo Moser (ITA)	G.B.C.	39h 07' 26"
2	Claudio Michelotto (ITA)	Scic	+ 37"
3	Enrico Paolini (ITA)	Scic	+ 5' 32"
4	Ugo Colombo (ITA)	Filotex	+ 6' 07"
5	Gösta Pettersson (SWE)	Ferretti	+ 6' 54"
6	Silvano Schiavon (ITA)	Dreher	+ 7' 24"
7	Giancarlo Polidori (ITA)	Scic	+ 8' 33"
8	Herman Van Springel (BEL)	Molteni	+ 8' 58"
9	Wladimiro Panizza (ITA)	Cosatto	+ 9' 02"
10	Francisco Galdós (ESP)	Kas–Kaskol	+ 9' 20"

== Stage 8 ==
28 May 1971 — San Vincenzo to Casciana Terme, 203 km (126 mi)

Stage 8 result

Rank	Rider	Team	Time
1	Romano Tumellero (ITA)	Molteni	5h 27' 39"
2	Roger Swerts (BEL)	Molteni	+ 3"
3	Wilmo Francioni (ITA)	Ferretti	s.t.
4	José Luis Uribezubia (ESP)	Kas–Kaskol	s.t.
5	Roberto Poggiali (ITA)	Salvarani	s.t.
6	Louis Pfenninger (SUI)	G.B.C.	s.t.
7	Lino Farisato (ITA)	Ferretti	s.t.
8	Ole Ritter (DEN)	Dreher	+ 7"
9	Renato Laghi (ITA)	Filotex	s.t.
10	Mauro Simonetti (ITA)	Ferretti	+ 11"

General classification after Stage 8

Rank	Rider	Team	Time
1	Claudio Michelotto (ITA)	Scic	44h 39' 24"
2	Aldo Moser (ITA)	G.B.C.	+ 2' 02"
3	Enrico Paolini (ITA)	Scic	+ 4' 52"
4	Ugo Colombo (ITA)	Filotex	+ 5' 30"
5	Gösta Pettersson (SWE)	Ferretti	+ 6' 16"
6	Herman Van Springel (BEL)	Molteni	+ 8' 18"
7	Francisco Galdós (ESP)	Kas–Kaskol	+ 8' 43"
8	Silvano Schiavon (ITA)	Dreher	+ 9' 26"
9	Marinus Wagtmans (NED)	Molteni	+ 9' 44"
10	Antoine Houbrechts (BEL)	Salvarani	+ 10' 32"

== Stage 9 ==
29 May 1971 — Casciana Terme to Forte dei Marmi, 141 km (88 mi)

Stage 9 result

Rank	Rider	Team	Time
1	Marino Basso (ITA)	Molteni	3h 27' 37"
2	Patrick Sercu (BEL)	Dreher	s.t.
3	Dino Zandegù (ITA)	Salvarani	s.t.
4	Albert Van Vlierberghe (BEL)	Ferretti	s.t.
5	Noël Van Clooster (BEL)	Hertekamp–Magniflex	s.t.
6	Michele Dancelli (ITA)	Scic	s.t.
7	Luigi Sgarbozza (ITA)	G.B.C.	s.t.
8	Ole Ritter (DEN)	Dreher	s.t.
9	Giancarlo Polidori (ITA)	Scic	s.t.
10	Marinus Wagtmans (NED)	Molteni	s.t.

General classification after Stage 9

Rank	Rider	Team	Time
1	Claudio Michelotto (ITA)	Scic	48h 07' 01"
2	Aldo Moser (ITA)	G.B.C.	+ 2' 02"
3	Enrico Paolini (ITA)	Scic	+ 4' 52"
4	Ugo Colombo (ITA)	Filotex	+ 5' 30"
5	Gösta Pettersson (SWE)	Ferretti	+ 6' 17"
6	Herman Van Springel (BEL)	Molteni	+ 8' 18"
7	Francisco Galdós (ESP)	Kas–Kaskol	+ 8' 43"
8	Silvano Schiavon (ITA)	Dreher	+ 9' 26"
9	Marinus Wagtmans (NED)	Molteni	+ 9' 44"
10	Antoine Houbrechts (BEL)	Salvarani	+ 10' 32"

== Stage 10 ==
30 May 1971 — Forte dei Marmi to Pian del Falco di Sestola, 123 km (76 mi)

Stage 10 result

Rank	Rider	Team	Time
1	José Manuel Fuente (ESP)	Kas–Kaskol	3h 38' 18"
2	Lino Farisato (ITA)	Ferretti	+ 3"
3	Erik Pettersson (SWE)	Ferretti	+ 17"
4	Arturo Pecchielan (ITA)	G.B.C.	+ 18"
5	Giovanni Cavalcanti (ITA)	Filotex	+ 28"
6	José Luis Uribezubia (ESP)	Kas–Kaskol	+ 31"
7	Donato Giuliani (ITA)	Filotex	+ 43"
8	Andrés Gandarias (ESP)	Kas–Kaskol	+ 52"
9	Antoine Houbrechts (BEL)	Salvarani	+ 59"
10	Roger Swerts (BEL)	Molteni	+ 1' 08"

General classification after Stage 10

Rank	Rider	Team	Time
1	Claudio Michelotto (ITA)	Scic	51h 47' 51"
2	Aldo Moser (ITA)	G.B.C.	+ 2' 25"
3	Enrico Paolini (ITA)	Scic	+ 4' 55"
4	Ugo Colombo (ITA)	Filotex	+ 5' 33"
5	Gösta Pettersson (SWE)	Ferretti	+ 6' 20"
6	Herman Van Springel (BEL)	Molteni	+ 8' 18"
7	Francisco Galdós (ESP)	Kas–Kaskol	+ 8' 58"
8	Antoine Houbrechts (BEL)	Salvarani	+ 8' 59"
9	Silvano Schiavon (ITA)	Dreher	+ 9' 29"
10	Marinus Wagtmans (NED)	Molteni	+ 9' 47"
