= 1970 Giro d'Italia, Stage 1 to Stage 10 =

Cycling race stages

The 1970 Giro d'Italia was the 53rd edition of the Giro d'Italia, one of cycling's Grand Tours. The Giro began in San Pellegrino Terme on 18 May, and Stage 10 occurred on 28 May with a stage to Rivisondoli. The race finished in Bolzano on 7 June. For the first time in the Giro, antidoping tests were carried out in the year 1968. The outcomes, though, were communicated only at the end of the race and caused some perplexity and dispute. Even after some counter-tests, Delisle, Motta, Abt, Bodrero, Van Schil, Galera, Diaz and Di Toro were proven positive.

== Stage 1 ==
18 May 1970 — San Pellegrino Terme to Biandronno, 115 km (71 mi)

Stage 1 result and general classification after Stage 1

Rank	Rider	Team	Time
1	Franco Bitossi (ITA)	Filotex	2h 38' 52"
2	Giancarlo Polidori (ITA)	Scic	+ 1"
3	Albert Van Vlierberghe (BEL)	Ferretti	s.t.
4	Ambrogio Portalupi (ITA)	Scic	s.t.
5	Jos Huysmans (BEL)	Faemino–Faema	s.t.
6	Ole Ritter (DEN)	Germanvox	s.t.
7	Michele Dancelli (ITA)	Molteni	s.t.
8	Wladimiro Panizza (ITA)	Salvarani	s.t.
9	Aldo Balasso (ITA)	Sagit	s.t.
10	Giampaolo Cucchietti (ITA)	Ferretti	s.t.

== Stage 2 ==
19 May 1970 — Comerio to Saint-Vincent, 164 km (102 mi)

Stage 2 result

Rank	Rider	Team	Time
1	Eddy Merckx (BEL)	Faemino–Faema	4h 05' 56"
2	Franco Bitossi (ITA)	Filotex	s.t.
3	Dino Zandegù (ITA)	Salvarani	s.t.
4	Marcello Bergamo (ITA)	Filotex	+ 1"
5	Martin Van Den Bossche (BEL)	Molteni	s.t.
6	Michele Dancelli (ITA)	Molteni	s.t.
7	Noël Van Clooster (BEL)	Magniflex	s.t.
8	Rudi Altig (FRG)	G.B.C.	s.t.
9	Giacinto Santambrogio (ITA)	Molteni	s.t.
10	Miguel María Lasa (ESP)	La Casera	s.t.

General classification after Stage 2

Rank	Rider	Team	Time
1	Franco Bitossi (ITA)	Filotex	6h 44' 48"
2	Michele Dancelli (ITA)	Molteni	+ 2"
3	Wladimiro Panizza (ITA)	Salvarani	s.t.
4	Ole Ritter (DEN)	Germanvox	+ 7"
5	Giancarlo Polidori (ITA)	Scic	s.t.
6	Dino Zandegù (ITA)	Salvarani	+ 22"
7	Eddy Merckx (BEL)	Faemino–Faema	s.t.
8	Rudi Altig (FRG)	G.B.C.	+ 23"
9	Noël Van Clooster (BEL)	Magniflex	s.t.
10	Miguel María Lasa (ESP)	La Casera	s.t.

== Stage 3 ==
20 May 1970 — Saint-Vincent to Aosta, 162 km (101 mi)

Stage 3 result

Rank	Rider	Team	Time
1	Franco Bitossi (ITA)	Filotex	5h 09' 32"
2	Michele Dancelli (ITA)	Molteni	s.t.
3	Eddy Merckx (BEL)	Faemino–Faema	s.t.
4	Marcello Bergamo (ITA)	Filotex	s.t.
5	Felice Gimondi (ITA)	Salvarani	s.t.
6	Giancarlo Polidori (ITA)	Scic	s.t.
7	Martin Van Den Bossche (BEL)	Molteni	s.t.
8	Antoine Houbrechts (BEL)	Salvarani	s.t.
9	Italo Zilioli (ITA)	Faemino–Faema	s.t.
10	Roberto Poggiali (ITA)	Salvarani	s.t.

General classification after Stage 3

Rank	Rider	Team	Time
1	Franco Bitossi (ITA)	Filotex	11h 53' 27"
2	Michele Dancelli (ITA)	Molteni	+ 2"
3	Giancarlo Polidori (ITA)	Scic	+ 7"
4	Ole Ritter (DEN)	Germanvox	s.t.
5	Eddy Merckx (BEL)	Faemino–Faema	+ 22"
6	Martin Van Den Bossche (BEL)	Molteni	+ 23"
7	Felice Gimondi (ITA)	Salvarani	s.t.
8	Marcello Bergamo (ITA)	Filotex	s.t.
9	Pierfranco Vianelli (ITA)	Molteni	+ 28"
10	Roberto Poggiali (ITA)	Salvarani	s.t.

== Stage 4 ==
21 May 1970 — Saint-Vincent to Lodi, 205 km (127 mi)

Stage 4 result

Rank	Rider	Team	Time
1	Marino Basso (ITA)	Molteni	5h 20' 24"
2	Patrick Sercu (BEL)	Dreher	s.t.
3	Guido Reybrouck (BEL)	Germanvox	s.t.
4	Georges Vandenberghe (BEL)	Faemino–Faema	s.t.
5	Jean Ronsmans (BEL)	Magniflex	s.t.
6	Luigi Sgarbozza (ITA)	Dreher	s.t.
7	Dino Zandegù (ITA)	Salvarani	s.t.
8	Virgino Levati (ITA)	Sagit	s.t.
9	Michele Dancelli (ITA)	Molteni	s.t.
10	Enrico Paolini (ITA)	Scic	s.t.

General classification after Stage 4

Rank	Rider	Team	Time
1	Franco Bitossi (ITA)	Filotex	17h 13' 51"
2	Michele Dancelli (ITA)	Molteni	+ 2"
3	Giancarlo Polidori (ITA)	Scic	+ 7"
4	Ole Ritter (DEN)	Germanvox	s.t.
5	Eddy Merckx (BEL)	Faemino–Faema	+ 22"
6	Martin Van Den Bossche (BEL)	Molteni	+ 23"
7	Felice Gimondi (ITA)	Salvarani	s.t.
8	Marcello Bergamo (ITA)	Filotex	s.t.
9	Pierfranco Vianelli (ITA)	Molteni	+ 28"
10	Roberto Poggiali (ITA)	Salvarani	s.t.

== Stage 5 ==
22 May 1970 — Lodi to Zingonia, 155 km (96 mi)

Stage 5 result

Rank	Rider	Team	Time
1	Patrick Sercu (BEL)	Dreher	3h 57' 48"
2	Marino Basso (ITA)	Molteni	s.t.
3	Franco Bitossi (ITA)	Filotex	s.t.
4	Michele Dancelli (ITA)	Molteni	s.t.
5	Eddy Merckx (BEL)	Faemino–Faema	s.t.
6	Giuseppe Milioli (ITA)	Germanvox	s.t.
7	Jean Ronsmans (BEL)	Magniflex	s.t.
8	Miguel María Lasa (ESP)	La Casera	s.t.
9	Marcello Bergamo (ITA)	Filotex	s.t.
10	Attilio Benfatto (ITA)	Scic	s.t.

General classification after Stage 5

Rank	Rider	Team	Time
1	Franco Bitossi (ITA)	Filotex	21h 11' 39"
2	Michele Dancelli (ITA)	Molteni	+ 2"
3	Giancarlo Polidori (ITA)	Scic	+ 7"
4	Ole Ritter (DEN)	Germanvox	s.t.
5	Eddy Merckx (BEL)	Faemino–Faema	+ 22"
6	Marcello Bergamo (ITA)	Filotex	+ 23"
7	Felice Gimondi (ITA)	Salvarani	s.t.
8	Martin Van Den Bossche (BEL)	Molteni	s.t.
9	Antoine Houbrechts (BEL)	Salvarani	+ 28"
10	Pierfranco Vianelli (ITA)	Molteni	s.t.

== Stage 6 ==
23 May 1970 — Zingonia to Malcesine, 212 km (132 mi)

Stage 6 result

Rank	Rider	Team	Time
1	Enrico Paolini (ITA)	Scic	5h 52' 02"
2	Guerrino Tosello (ITA)	Molteni	s.t.
3	Martin Van Den Bossche (BEL)	Molteni	+ 20"
4	Ole Ritter (DEN)	Germanvox	s.t.
5	Vittorio Adorni (ITA)	Scic	s.t.
6	Giancarlo Polidori (ITA)	Scic	s.t.
7	Italo Zilioli (ITA)	Faemino–Faema	s.t.
8	Felice Gimondi (ITA)	Salvarani	s.t.
9	Renato Rota (ITA)	Ferretti	s.t.
10	Michele Dancelli (ITA)	Molteni	s.t.

General classification after Stage 6

Rank	Rider	Team	Time
1	Franco Bitossi (ITA)	Filotex	27h 03' 31"
2	Michele Dancelli (ITA)	Molteni	+ 2"
3	Giancarlo Polidori (ITA)	Scic	+ 7"
4	Ole Ritter (DEN)	Germanvox	s.t.
5	Eddy Merckx (BEL)	Faemino–Faema	+ 22"
6	Felice Gimondi (ITA)	Salvarani	+ 23"
7	Martin Van Den Bossche (BEL)	Molteni	s.t.
8	Pierfranco Vianelli (ITA)	Molteni	+ 28"
9	Italo Zilioli (ITA)	Faemino–Faema	+ 1' 01"
10	Miguel María Lasa (ESP)	La Casera	+ 1' 33"

== Stage 7 ==
24 May 1970 — Malcesine to Brentonico, 130 km (81 mi)

Stage 7 result

Rank	Rider	Team	Time
1	Eddy Merckx (BEL)	Faemino–Faema	3h 34' 45"
2	Martin Van Den Bossche (BEL)	Molteni	+ 12"
3	Italo Zilioli (ITA)	Faemino–Faema	+ 44"
4	Michele Dancelli (ITA)	Molteni	+ 48"
5	Felice Gimondi (ITA)	Salvarani	+ 49"
6	Vittorio Adorni (ITA)	Scic	+ 57"
7	Ole Ritter (DEN)	Germanvox	+ 1' 10"
8	Franco Bitossi (ITA)	Filotex	+ 1' 26"
9	Miguel María Lasa (ESP)	La Casera	+ 1' 51"
10	Pierfranco Vianelli (ITA)	Molteni	+ 2' 05"

General classification after Stage 7

Rank	Rider	Team	Time
1	Eddy Merckx (BEL)	Faemino–Faema	30h 38' 58"
2	Martin Van Den Bossche (BEL)	Molteni	+ 13"
3	Michele Dancelli (ITA)	Molteni	+ 28"
4	Felice Gimondi (ITA)	Salvarani	+ 50"
5	Ole Ritter (DEN)	Germanvox	+ 55"
6	Franco Bitossi (ITA)	Filotex	+ 1' 04"
7	Italo Zilioli (ITA)	Faemino–Faema	+ 1' 23"
8	Pierfranco Vianelli (ITA)	Molteni	+ 2' 11"
9	Vittorio Adorni (ITA)	Scic	+ 2' 13"
10	Miguel María Lasa (ESP)	La Casera	+ 3' 02"

== Stage 8 ==
25 May 1970 — Rovereto to Bassano del Grappa, 130 km (81 mi)

Stage 8 result

Rank	Rider	Team	Time
1	Walter Godefroot (BEL)	Salvarani	3h 16' 02"
2	Guido Reybrouck (BEL)	Germanvox	s.t.
3	Patrick Sercu (BEL)	Dreher	s.t.
4	Albert Van Vlierberghe (BEL)	Ferretti	s.t.
5	Marino Basso (ITA)	Molteni	s.t.
6	Georges Vandenberghe (BEL)	Faemino–Faema	s.t.
7	Jean Ronsmans (BEL)	Magniflex	s.t.
8	Franco Bitossi (ITA)	Filotex	s.t.
9	Michele Dancelli (ITA)	Molteni	s.t.
10	Frans Mintjens (BEL)	Faemino–Faema	s.t.

General classification after Stage 8

Rank	Rider	Team	Time
1	Eddy Merckx (BEL)	Faemino–Faema	33h 55' 00"
2	Martin Van Den Bossche (BEL)	Molteni	+ 13"
3	Michele Dancelli (ITA)	Molteni	+ 28"
4	Felice Gimondi (ITA)	Salvarani	+ 50"
5	Ole Ritter (DEN)	Germanvox	+ 55"
6	Franco Bitossi (ITA)	Filotex	+ 1' 04"
7	Italo Zilioli (ITA)	Faemino–Faema	+ 1' 23"
8	Pierfranco Vianelli (ITA)	Molteni	+ 2' 11"
9	Vittorio Adorni (ITA)	Scic	+ 2' 13"
10	Miguel María Lasa (ESP)	La Casera	+ 3' 02"

== Stage 9 ==
26 May 1970 — Bassano del Grappa to Treviso, 56 km (35 mi) (ITT)

Stage 9 result

Rank	Rider	Team	Time
1	Eddy Merckx (BEL)	Faemino–Faema	1h 10' 55"
2	Ole Ritter (DEN)	Germanvox	+ 1' 46"
3	Felice Gimondi (ITA)	Salvarani	+ 2' 02"
4	Adriano Pella (ITA)	Germanvox	+ 2' 44"
5	Gösta Pettersson (SWE)	Ferretti	+ 2' 56"
6	Giuseppe Rosolen (ITA)	Filotex	+ 3' 03"
7	Vittorio Adorni (ITA)	Scic	+ 3' 06"
8	Martin Van Den Bossche (BEL)	Molteni	+ 3' 46"
9	Franco Bitossi (ITA)	Filotex	+ 4' 02"
10	Italo Zilioli (ITA)	Faemino–Faema	+ 4' 11"

General classification after Stage 9

Rank	Rider	Team	Time
1	Eddy Merckx (BEL)	Faemino–Faema	35h 05' 55"
2	Ole Ritter (DEN)	Germanvox	+ 2' 41"
3	Felice Gimondi (ITA)	Salvarani	+ 2' 52"
4	Martin Van Den Bossche (BEL)	Molteni	+ 3' 59"
5	Franco Bitossi (ITA)	Filotex	+ 5' 06"
6	Vittorio Adorni (ITA)	Scic	+ 5' 18"
7	Italo Zilioli (ITA)	Faemino–Faema	+ 5' 34"
8	Michele Dancelli (ITA)	Molteni	+ 6' 22"
9	Gösta Pettersson (SWE)	Ferretti	+ 6' 33"
10	Pierfranco Vianelli (ITA)	Molteni	+ 7' 07"

== Rest day ==
27 May 1970

== Stage 10 ==
28 May 1970 — Terracina to Rivisondoli, 172 km (107 mi)

Stage 10 result

Rank	Rider	Team	Time
1	Italo Zilioli (ITA)	Faemino–Faema	5h 22' 51"
2	Franco Bitossi (ITA)	Filotex	+ 13"
3	Marcello Bergamo (ITA)	Filotex	+ 26"
4	Martin Van Den Bossche (BEL)	Molteni	s.t.
5	Eddy Merckx (BEL)	Faemino–Faema	s.t.
6	Michele Dancelli (ITA)	Molteni	s.t.
7	Felice Gimondi (ITA)	Salvarani	s.t.
8	Miguel María Lasa (ESP)	La Casera	s.t.
9	Ole Ritter (DEN)	Germanvox	s.t.
10	José Manuel Lasa (ESP)	La Casera	s.t.

General classification after Stage 10

Rank	Rider	Team	Time
1	Eddy Merckx (BEL)	Faemino–Faema	40h 29' 12"
2	Ole Ritter (DEN)	Germanvox	+ 2' 41"
3	Felice Gimondi (ITA)	Salvarani	+ 2' 52"
4	Martin Van Den Bossche (BEL)	Molteni	+ 4' 59"
5	Italo Zilioli (ITA)	Faemino–Faema	+ 5' 08"
6	Vittorio Adorni (ITA)	Scic	+ 5' 19"
7	Franco Bitossi (ITA)	Filotex	+ 5' 53"
8	Michele Dancelli (ITA)	Molteni	+ 6' 22"
9	Gösta Pettersson (SWE)	Ferretti	+ 6' 33"
10	Pierfranco Vianelli (ITA)	Molteni	+ 7' 37"
