= Classica Sarda =

Road bicycle race held in Sardinia

Race details
- Date: Late February
- Region: Sardinia, Italy
- Local name(s): Classica Sarda (in Italian)
- Discipline: Road
- Competition: UCI Europe Tour
- Type: Single-day
- Organiser: RCS Sport

History
- First edition: 1948
- Editions: 33
- Final edition: 2011
- First winner: Adolfo Leoni (ITA)
- Most wins: Edgard Sorgeloos (BEL) Giancarlo Polidori (ITA) Roger De Vlaeminck (BEL) (2 wins)
- Final winner: Pavel Brutt (RUS)

Classica Sarda was a road bicycle race that took place on the Italian island Sardinia. It was held after the Giro di Sardegna from 1948 until 1983.

During this period, it was organized under different names, like GP Alghero from 1965 to 1967, Monte Urpino in 1975 and Cagliari-Sassari in 1951, 1980 and 1982.

The race reappeared again on the cycling calendar in 2010 as Classica Sarda Olbia-Pantogia (from Olbia to Pantogia) as a 1.1 event on the UCI Europe Tour.

In 2011, its final edition was organized as the Classica Sarda Sassari-Cagliari.

== Winners ==
Anno	Winner	Second	Third
1948	(Italy) Adolfo Leoni	(Italy) Luciano Maggini	(Italy) Giovanni Corrieri
1949	(Italy) Italo De Zan	(Italy) Vincenzo Rossello	(Italy) Marcello Paolieri
1950	no edition		
1951	(Italy) Renzo Soldani	(Italy) Gino Bartali	(Italy) Giancarlo Astrua
1952	(Italy) Giovanni Corrieri	(Italy) Mario Baroni	(Italy) Ivo Baronti
1953	(Italy) Fiorenzo Magni	(Italy) Giuseppe Minardi	(Italy) Giovanni Corrieri
1954	(Switzerland) Hugo Koblet	(Italy) Stefano Gaggero	(Italy) Remo Bartalini
1955	(Italy) Donato Piazza	(Italy) Vincenzo Zucconelli	(Italy) Bruno Monti
1956	(Italy) Nello Fabbri	(Italy) Giuseppe Pintarelli	(Italy) Bruno Monti
1957	(Belgium) Alfred De Bruyne	(Belgium) Rik Van Looy	(Italy) Guido Boni
1958	no edition		
1959	(Belgium) Edgard Sorgeloos	(Italy) Vito Favero	(Italy) Guido Carlesi
1960	(Spain) Miguel Poblet	(Belgium) Rik Van Looy	(Italy) Rino Benedetti
1961	no edition		
1962	(Italy) Guido Carlesi	(Italy) Livio Trapè	(Italy) Franco Magnani
1963	(Italy) Battista Babini	(Spain) Antonio Suárez	(Italy) Luigi Mele
1964	(Belgium) Edgard Sorgeloos	(Spain) Antonio Suárez	(Italy) Guido Carlesi
1965	(Belgium) Rik Van Looy	(Belgium) Edward Sels	(France) Jean Graczyk
1966	(Italy) Pasquale Fabbri	(Italy) Giampiero Macchi	(Italy) Adriano Durante
1967	(Belgium) Robert Lelangue	(Belgium) Henri De Wolf	(Netherlands) Evert Dolman
1968	(Italy) Franco Bitossi	(Netherlands) ~~Jos van der Vleuten~~ (Note: van der Vleuten was disqualified and second place remained unassigned)	(Belgium) Eddy Merckx
1969	(Italy) Vittorio Adorni	(Italy) Giuseppe Milioli	(Italy) Luigi Sgarbozza
1970	(West Germany) Rudi Altig	(Italy) Attilio Rota	(Italy) Giacinto Santambrogio
1971	(Belgium) Albert Van Vlierberghe	(Belgium) Guido Reybrouck	(Belgium) Patrick Sercu
1972	(Italy) Giancarlo Polidori	(Italy) Romano Tumellero	(Belgium) Patrick Sercu
1973	(Belgium) Patrick Sercu	(Italy) Marino Basso	(Italy) Franco Ongarato
1974	(Italy) Giancarlo Polidori	(Italy) Wilmo Francioni	(Belgium) Joseph Bruyère
1975	(Belgium) Eddy Merckx	(Italy) Gianbattista Baronchelli	(Switzerland) Roland Salm
1976	(Belgium) Roger De Vlaeminck	(Italy) Franco Bitossi	(Australia) Gary Clively
1977	(Italy) Ercole Gualazzini	(Italy) Pierino Gavazzi	(Italy) Felice Gimondi
1978	(Belgium) Roger De Vlaeminck	(Italy) Giuseppe Martinelli	(Italy) Franco Bitossi
1979	no edition		
1980	(Italy) Serge Parsani	(Italy) Claudio Torelli	(Italy) Carmelo Barone
1981	no edition		
1982	(Belgium) Alfons De Wolf	(Italy) Pierangelo Bincoletto	(Italy) Giovanni Mantovani
1983	(Italy) Giuseppe Saronni	(Italy) Giovanni Mantovani	(Netherlands) Frits Pirard
1984-2009	no editions		
2010	(Italy) Giovanni Visconti	(Italy) Fabio Sabatini	(France) Geoffroy Lequatre
2011	(Russia) Pavel Brutt	(Italy) Emanuele Sella	(Slovakia) Peter Sagan
