= Celestino Vercelli =

Italian cyclist (1946–2020)

Personal information
- Born: 10 August 1946 Soriso, Italy
- Died: 26 November 2020 (aged 74)

Cycling career
- Sport: Cycling
- Discipline: Road
- Role: Rider

Amateur team
- 1967: U.S. Vallese

Professional teams
- 1969: Sanson
- 1970: Germanvox–Wega
- 1971–1976: Scic
- 1977: Brooklyn
- 1978: Intercontinentale

Celestino Vercelli (10 August 1946 – 26 November 2020) was an Italian professional racing cyclist. He rode in the 1971 and 1976 Tour de France as well as in seven editions of the Giro d'Italia and the 1970 Vuelta a España.

== Major results ==
1970
7th Trofeo Baracchi (with Adriano Pella)
10th Giro di Toscana
1971
5th Coppa Bernocchi
7th Giro del Piemonte
1972
5th Giro del Veneto
6th Giro dell'Umbria
7th Gran Premio Industria e Commercio di Prato
1975
2nd Coppa Sabatini
7th GP Montelupo
1976
3rd Overall Cronostaffetta

=== Grand Tour general classification results timeline ===
| Grand Tour | 1969 | 1970 | 1971 | 1972 | 1973 | 1974 | 1975 | 1976 | 1977 |
|---|---|---|---|---|---|---|---|---|---|
| Giro d'Italia | 59 | 64 | — | 52 | 75 | 63 | 44 | — | 84 |
| Tour de France | — | — | 83 | — | — | — | — | 55 | — |
| Vuelta a España | — | 45 | — | — | — | — | — | — | — |
