= Giuseppe Grassi =

Giuseppe Grassi may refer to:

- Giuseppe Grassi (politician) (1883–1950), Italian politician
- Giuseppe Grassi (cyclist) (born 1942), Italian cyclist
