= GP Montelupo =

Race details
- Region: Province of Florence, Italy
- Discipline: Road
- Type: One-day race

History
- First edition: 1965
- Editions: 20
- Final edition: 1984
- First winner: Michele Dancelli (ITA)
- Most wins: Roger De Vlaeminck (BEL); Ennio Salvador (ITA); (2 wins)
- Final winner: Ennio Salvador (ITA)

The GP Montelupo was a professional one-day road cycling race held annually from 1965 to 1984 in the Province of Florence, Italy.

== Winners ==
Year	Winner	Second	Third
1965	(Italy) Michele Dancelli	(Italy) Franco Bitossi	(Italy) Roberto Poggiali
1966	(Italy) Franco Cribiori	(Italy) Dino Zandegù	(Italy) Italo Zilioli
1967	(Italy) Wladimiro Panizza	(Italy) Gianni Motta	(Italy) Giorgio Favaro
1968	(Italy) Ugo Colombo	(Italy) Alfio Poli	(Italy) Mario Di Toro
1969	(Italy) Franco Bitossi	(Italy) Davide Boifava	(Italy) Roberto Ballini
1970	(Italy) Giancarlo Polidori	(Italy) Felice Gimondi	(Italy) Romano Tumellero
1971	(Italy) Ottavio Crepaldi	(Italy) Roberto Poggiali	(Italy) Wilmo Francioni
1972	(Italy) Davide Boifava	(Italy) Wilmo Francioni	(Italy) Wladimiro Panizza
1973	(Italy) Italo Zilioli	(Italy) Franco Bitossi	(Italy) Wilmo Francioni
1974	(Italy) Marino Basso	(Belgium) Roger De Vlaeminck	(Italy) Francesco Moser
1975	(Belgium) Roger De Vlaeminck	(Switzerland) Roland Salm	(Italy) Wilmo Francioni
1976	(Belgium) Roger De Vlaeminck	(Italy) Pierino Gavazzi	(Italy) Enrico Paolini
1977	(Italy) Giovanni Battaglin	(Italy) Giuseppe Saronni	(Italy) Pierino Gavazzi
1978	(Italy) Carmelo Barone	(Italy) Ottavio Crepaldi	(Italy) Gaetano Baronchelli
1979	(Italy) Leonardo Mazzantini	(Italy) Carmelo Barone	(Italy) Marino Amadori
1980	(Italy) Gianbattista Baronchelli	(Italy) Valerio Lualdi	(Italy) Pierino Gavazzi
1981	(Italy) Pierino Gavazzi	(Italy) Roberto Ceruti	(Italy) Franco Conti
1982	(Italy) Palmiro Masciarelli	(Italy) Pierino Gavazzi	(Italy) Claudio Torelli
1983	(Italy) Ennio Salvador	(Italy) Moreno Argentin	(Australia) Michael Wilson
1984	(Italy) Ennio Salvador	(Belgium) Rudy Pevenage	(Italy) Marino Amadori
