= Francisco Julia =

Spanish cyclist

Personal information
- Born: 4 May 1942 (age 84)

Cycling career
- Sport: Cycling
- Role: Rider

Francisco Julia (born 4 May 1942) is a Spanish racing cyclist. He rode in the 1971 Tour de France.
