= Marino Amadori =

Italian cyclist

- Marino Amadori at Tour of Romania 2026

Personal information
- Born: 9 April 1957 (age 69) Predappio, Italy

Cycling career
- Sport: Cycling
- Current team: Retired
- Discipline: Road
- Role: Rider

Professional teams
- 1978: Intercontinentale
- 1979: Sapa
- 1980–1981: Magniflex–Olmo
- 1982: Famcucine
- 1983: Gis Gelati
- 1984–1988: Alfa Lum–Olmo
- 1989–1990: Del Tongo

Marino Amadori (born 9 April 1957) is an Italian former cyclist. He rode in 12 editions of the Giro d'Italia; his top result was 11th overall in 1979.

== Major results ==
1979
3rd GP Montelupo
1981
1st Giro del Piemonte
2nd Giro del Friuli
3rd Overall Tirreno–Adriatico

1st Stage 1

3rd Coppa Placci
1983
1st Trofeo Matteotti
1st Coppa Placci
1984
3rd Giro del Lazio
3rd Tre Valli Varesine
3rd GP Montelupo
1985
1st Coppa Sabatini
2nd Giro dell'Umbria
2nd Giro della Romagna
2nd Gran Premio Città di Camaiore
2nd Milano–Vignola
1986
1st Coppa Agostoni
1987
1st GP Industria & Artigianato di Larciano
2nd Giro del Veneto

== Post racing ==
Amadori became a cycling coach. He coached the women's national team from 2005 to 2008. In 2009 he has been appointed as coach of the Italian men's U23 road team. Under his guidance, Samuele Battistella and Filippo Baroncini won the U23 world title.
