= Matthijs de Koning =

Dutch racing cyclist

Personal information
- Born: 18 March 1949 (age 77) Scherpenzeel, Gelderland, Netherlands

Cycling career
- Sport: Cycling
- Role: Rider

Matthijs de Koning (born 18 March 1949) is a Dutch racing cyclist. He rode in the 1971 Tour de France. De Koning was born in Scherpenzeel, Gelderland.
