= Gianfranco Bianchin =

Italian cyclist

Personal information
- Born: 6 February 1947
- Died: 1 August 1970 (aged 23)

Cycling career
- Sport: Cycling
- Discipline: Road
- Role: Rider

Amateur teams
- 1966: U.C. Trevigiani
- 1968: G.S. Casagrande Caneva

Professional teams
- 1969: Gris 2000
- 1970: Molteni

Gianfranco Bianchin (6 February 1947 – 1 August 1970) was an Italian professional road cyclist. Bianchin died at the age of 23, drowning in the Adriatic Sea in only his second season as a professional. He won the 1970 Giro di Toscana and placed second in the Giro di Campania the same year and the Coppa Sabatini the previous year. He also competed in the 1969 and 1970 Giro d'Italia.

The Trofeo Gianfranco Bianchin race is named after him, which has been organized since 1970 in Ponzano Veneto.

== Major results ==
1966
1st Trofeo Città di San Vendemiano
1968
1st Giro del Belvedere
1969
2nd Coppa Sabatini
3rd Coppa Placci
1970
1st Giro di Toscana
2nd Giro di Campania
2nd Grand Prix de Monaco
