= Pierre Rivory =

French cyclist

Personal information
- Born: 22 September 1945 (age 81)

Cycling career
- Sport: Cycling
- Role: Rider

Pierre Rivory (born 22 September 1945) is a French racing cyclist. He rode in the 1971 Tour de France.
