= Eliolona (cycling team) =

Team information
- Registered: Italy
- Founded: 1969
- Disbanded: 1969
- Discipline: Road

Key personnel
- Team manager: Silvano Ciampi

Team name history
- 1969: Eliolona

Eliolona was an Italian professional cycling team that existed only for the 1969 season. The team competed in the 1969 Giro d'Italia. Their main rider was Spanish cyclist Julio Jiménez.
