= Giro dell'Umbria =

Race details
- Date: August/September
- Region: Umbria, Italy
- English name: Tour of Umbria
- Discipline: Road
- Type: One-day race

History
- First edition: 1910
- Editions: 50
- Final edition: 1991
- First winner: Alfredo Tibiletti (ITA)
- Most wins: Francesco Moser (ITA) (5 wins)
- Final winner: Edoardo Rocchi (ITA)

The Giro dell'Umbria was a single-day road bicycle race held annually in Umbria, Italy from 1910 to 1991. After 1991, the race was merged with the newly created Trofeo Melinda.

== Winners ==
Year	Winner	Second	Third
1910	(Italy) Alfredo Tibiletti	(Italy) Luigi Cagna	(Italy) Attilio Mantovani
1911	(Italy) Giuseppe Azzini	(Italy) Camillo Bertarelli	(Italy) Labindo Mancinelli
1912	(Italy) Giuseppe Bonfanti	(Italy) Luigi Lucotti	(Italy) Giovanni Bassi
1913-18	No race		
1919	(Italy) Arturo Ferrario		
1920-21	No race		
1922	(Italy) Michele Gordini		
1923	(Italy) Giuseppe Trentarossi	(Italy) Guido Messeri	(Italy) Alfredo Ciotti
1924	(Italy) Giuseppe Bestetti		
1925	No race		
1926	(Italy) Emilio Petiva	(Italy) Alfredo Barducci	(Italy) Azeglio Terreni
1927	No race		
1928	(Italy) Leonida Frascarelli		
1929	(Italy) Marcello Neri		
1930	(Italy) Ambrogio Morelli	(Italy) Remo Bertoni	(Italy) Antonio Liguori
1931	(Italy) Ettore Meini	(Italy) Attilio Pavesi	(Italy) Ascanio Arcangeli
1932	(Italy) Giovanni Mancinelli		
1933	(Italy) Aldo Bini	(Italy) Aladino Mealli	(Italy) Giovanni Mancinelli
1934	No race		
1935	(Italy) G. Doni		
1936-37	No race		
1938	(Italy) Secondo Magni	(Italy) Enrico Mara	(Italy) Enrico Mollo
1939	(Italy) Giordano Cottur	(Italy) Vasco Bergamaschi	(Italy) Giovanni De Stefanis
1940	(Italy) Aldo Ronconi	(Italy) Glauco Servadei	(Italy) Mario De Benedetti
1941	(Italy) U. Mancinelli		
1942-46	No race		
1947	(Italy) Marcello Roggi		
1948	(Italy) Tino Cargioli		
1949	(France) Amédée Rolland	(Italy) Nazzareno Moretti	(Italy) Fausto Morini
1950	(Italy) Renzo Soldani	(Italy) Luciano Frosini	(Italy) Umberto Drei
1951	No race		
1952	(Italy) Mario Rosario	(Italy) Fernando Desideri	(Italy) Noé Conti
1953	(Italy) Pietro Nascimbene		
1954	(Italy) Giuseppe Marcoccia	(Italy) Virgilio Rezzi	(Italy) Italo Mazzacurati
1955	(Italy) Ardelio Trapé		
1956	(Italy) Bruno Tognaccini		
1957-69	No race		
1970	(Italy) Gianni Motta	(Italy) Renato Laghi	(Italy) Donato Giuliani
1971	(Belgium) Antoon Houbrechts	(Italy) Luigi Sgarbozza	(Italy) Roberto Poggiali
1972	(Italy) Enrico Paolini	(Italy) Roberto Poggiali	(Italy) Arnaldo Caverzasi
1973	(Italy) Giancarlo Polidori	(Italy) Fabrizio Fabbri	(Italy) Antonio Salutini
1974	(Italy) Francesco Moser	(Italy) Franco Bitossi	(Italy) Felice Gimondi
1975	(Italy) Francesco Moser	(Italy) Fabrizio Fabbri	(Italy) Giovanni Battaglin
1976	(Italy) Roberto Poggiali	(Belgium) Antoon Houbrechts	(Italy) Enrico Paolini
1977	(Italy) Francesco Moser	(Italy) Franco Bitossi	(Italy) Giacinto Santambrogio
1978	(Italy) Gianbattista Baronchelli	(Italy) Giovanni Battaglin	(Italy) Mario Beccia
1979	(Italy) Carmelo Barone	(Italy) Pierino Gavazzi	(Italy) Silvano Contini
1980	(Italy) Roberto Ceruti	(Italy) Carmelo Barone	(Italy) Palmiro Masciarelli
1981	(Italy) Francesco Moser	(Switzerland) Jean-Marie Grezet	(Italy) Pierino Gavazzi
1982	(Italy) Gianbattista Baronchelli	(Italy) Emanuele Bombini	(Italy) Giovanni Mantovani
1983	(Italy) Francesco Moser	(Spain) Marino Lejarreta	(Italy) Gianbattista Baronchelli
1984	(Italy) Mario Beccia	(Italy) Gianbattista Baronchelli	(Italy) Silvano Contini
1985	(Italy) Claudio Corti	(Italy) Marino Amadori	(Italy) Giuseppe Passuello
1986	(Italy) Stefano Colagè	(Italy) Roberto Pagnin	(Italy) Palmiro Masciarelli
1987	(Italy) Silvano Contini	(Italy) Francesco Cesarini	(Italy) Renato Piccolo
1988	(Italy) Giorgio Furlan	(Italy) Luigi Botteon	(Italy) Danilo Gioia
1989	(Italy) Stefano Colagè	(Soviet Union) Ivan Ivanov	(Italy) Michele Moro
1990	(Italy) Massimo Ghirotto	(Argentina) Daniel Castro	(Italy) Edoardo Rocchi
1991	(Italy) Edoardo Rocchi	(Italy) Michele Moro	(Italy) Massimiliano Lelli
