= Sandro Quintarelli =

Italian cyclist

Personal information
- Born: 23 September 1945 (age 81) Negrar, Italy

Cycling career
- Sport: Cycling
- Discipline: Road
- Role: Rider

Professional teams
- 1969: Gris 2000
- 1970: Cosatto–Marsicano
- 1971–1972: Ferretti
- 1973–1974: Magniflex
- 1975–1976: Jollj Ceramica
- 1977: Selle Royal

Sandro Quintarelli (born 23 September 1945) is an Italian former professional racing cyclist. He rode in the 1971 and 1975 Tour de France as well as in seven editions of the Giro d'Italia.

== Major results ==
1970
5th Giro del Piemonte
6th Trofeo Matteotti
10th GP Montelupo
1972
9th Gran Premio Industria e Commercio di Prato
1973
4th Overall Giro di Sicilia

=== Grand Tour general classification results timeline ===
Grand Tour	1969	1970	1971	1972	1973	1974	1975	1976	1977
Giro d'Italia	80	91	—	—	104	77	68	75	102
Tour de France	—	—	81	—	—	—	DNF	—	—
Vuelta a España	—	—	—	—	—	—	—	—	—
