= Roberto Ballini =

Italian cyclist

Personal information
- Born: 14 March 1944 (age 82) Lucca, Italy

Cycling career
- Sport: Cycling
- Discipline: Road
- Role: Rider

Professional teams
- 1966–1967: Filotex
- 1968: Max Meyer
- 1969: G.B.C.
- 1970: Dreher
- 1971–1972: Ferretti

Major wins
- Grand Tours Giro d'Italia 1 individual stage (1969)

Roberto Ballini (born 14 March 1944) is an Italian former racing cyclist. He won stage 16 of the 1969 Giro d'Italia. he also won the Coppa Placci the same year.

== Major results ==
1964
2nd Gran Premio della Liberazione
1966
3rd Gran Premio Industria e Commercio di Prato
1967
2nd Gran Piemonte
3rd Gran Premio Città di Camaiore
6th Milano–Vignola
9th Overall Tour de Romandie
9th Trofeo Laigueglia
1968
2nd Giro dell'Appennino
2nd Gran Premio Città di Camaiore
3rd Coppa Bernocchi
6th Overall Tirreno–Adriatico
7th Milan–San Remo
8th Giro di Toscana
1969
1st Coppa Placci
1st Stage 16 Giro d'Italia
3rd GP Montelupo
5th Overall Tirreno–Adriatico
9th Coppa Sabatini
1971
4th Milan–San Remo
