= Silvano Davo =

Italian cyclist (1942–2019)

Personal information
- Born: 26 February 1945
- Died: 5 January 2019 (aged 73)

Cycling career
- Sport: Cycling
- Role: Rider

Silvano Davo (26 February 1942 – 5 January 2019) was an Italian racing cyclist. He rode in the 1971 Tour de France.
