= Giorgio Favaro =

Italian cyclist (1944–2002)

Personal information
- Born: 5 January 1944 San Giorgio in Bosco, Italy
- Died: 8 December 2002 (aged 58) Mornago, Italy

Cycling career
- Sport: Cycling
- Current team: Retired
- Discipline: Road
- Role: Rider

Amateur team
- UC Melzo

Professional teams
- 1966–1969: Filotex
- 1970: Sagit
- 1971: Molteni
- 1971: Zonca
- 1972: Ferretti
- 1973: Magniflex
- 1974: Zonca
- 1975: Furzi–FT

Giorgio Favaro (5 January 1944 – 8 December 2002) was an Italian racing cyclist, who competed as a professional from 1966 to 1975.

== Major results ==
1966
5th Overall Tour de l'Avenir

1st Mountains classification
1st Stage 9

1967
3rd Giro di Romagna
3rd GP Montelupo
1968
1st Stage 5 Tirreno–Adriatico
1969
1st Giro di Toscana
1971
3rd Gran Piemonte
3rd Giro delle Tre Provincie
5th Overall Tour de la Nouvelle-France
1972
1st Stage 4 Tour de Romandie

=== Grand Tour general classification results timeline ===
Grand Tour	1967	1968	1969	1970	1971	1972	1973	1974	1975
Vuelta a España	—	—	—	—	—	—	—	—	—
Giro d'Italia	57	DNF	76	DNF	71	DNF	87	83	24
Tour de France	—	—	—	—	—	—	—	—	—
