= Virginio Levati =

Italian cyclist

Personal information
- Born: 17 November 1944 (age 81)

Cycling career
- Sport: Cycling
- Role: Rider

Virginio Levati (born 17 November 1944) is an Italian racing cyclist. He rode in the 1971 Tour de France.
