= Aldo Moser =

Italian cyclist (1934–2020)

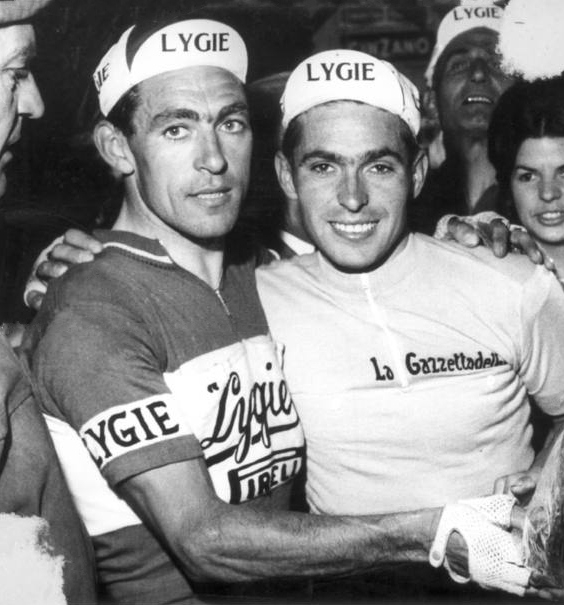
- Aldo (left) and Enzo Moser in 1964

Personal information
- Born: 7 February 1934 Giovo, Italy
- Died: 2 December 2020 (aged 86) Trento, Italy

Cycling career
- Sport: Cycling
- Discipline: Road
- Role: Rider

Professional teams
- 1954–1956: Torpado–Ursus
- 1957: Leo–Chlorodont
- 1958: Cali Broni–Girardengo
- 1959–1960: Faema–Guerra
- 1961: Ghigi
- 1962–1963: San Pellegrino
- 1964: Lygie
- 1965: Maino
- 1966–1968: Vittadello
- 1969–1972: G.B.C.
- 1973: Filotex
- 1974: Furzi

Aldo Moser (7 February 1934 – 2 December 2020) was an Italian cyclist.

== Biography ==
Moser rode in 16 editions of the Giro d'Italia and 4 of the Vuelta a España, totalling 20 Grand Tours. He came from a famous family of cyclists, including his younger brothers Francesco Moser, Enzo Moser and Diego Moser, and nephews Leonardo Moser, Ignazio Moser, and Moreno Moser.

=== Death ===
Moser was hospitalized with COVID-19 at a hospital in Trento, on 1 December 2020, amidst the COVID-19 pandemic in Italy. He died from the virus the next day on 2 December 2020, aged 86.

== Major results ==
1954
1st Coppa Agostoni
7th Giro di Lombardia
1955
1st Gran Premio Industria e Commercio di Prato
1st Stage 3 Roma–Napoli–Roma
2nd Milano–Torino
2nd Tre Valli Varesine
2nd Gran Premio di Lugano
3rd Giro dell'Appennino
6th Overall Giro d'Italia
1956
5th Overall Giro d'Italia
1957
2nd Gran Premio di Lugano
2nd Giro della Provincia di Reggio Calabria
3rd Overall Roma–Napoli–Roma

1st Stage 2

3rd Grand Prix des Nations
3rd Trofeo Baracchi (with Oreste Magni)
1958
1st Trofeo Baracchi (with Ercole Baldini)
2nd Tre Valli Varesine
2nd Trofeo Matteotti
2nd Giro del Ticino
2nd Gran Premio Industria e Commercio di Prato
3rd National Road Race Championships
10th Overall Giro d'Italia
10th Milan–San Remo
1959
1st Trofeo Baracchi (with Ercole Baldini)
1st Grand Prix des Nations
2nd Giro di Sardegna
2nd Giro del Piemonte
1960
1st Manche-Ocean
2nd Trofeo Baracchi (with Ercole Baldini)
1961
2nd Manche-Ocean
3rd Grand Prix des Nations
1962
3rd Trofeo Baracchi (with Giuseppe Fezzardi)
3rd Overall Tour de Suisse
1963
1st Coppa Bernocchi
8th Giro di Lombardia
1964
3rd Giro di Toscana
1966
1st Giro delle Tre Provincie
1969
2nd Giro del Lazio
7th Overall Giro d'Italia
9th Overall Tirreno–Adriatico
1970
10th Overall Tirreno–Adriatico
1971
5th Overall Tirreno–Adriatico
9th Overall Tour de Romandie
