= Sanson (cycling team, 1969) =

Italian cycling team

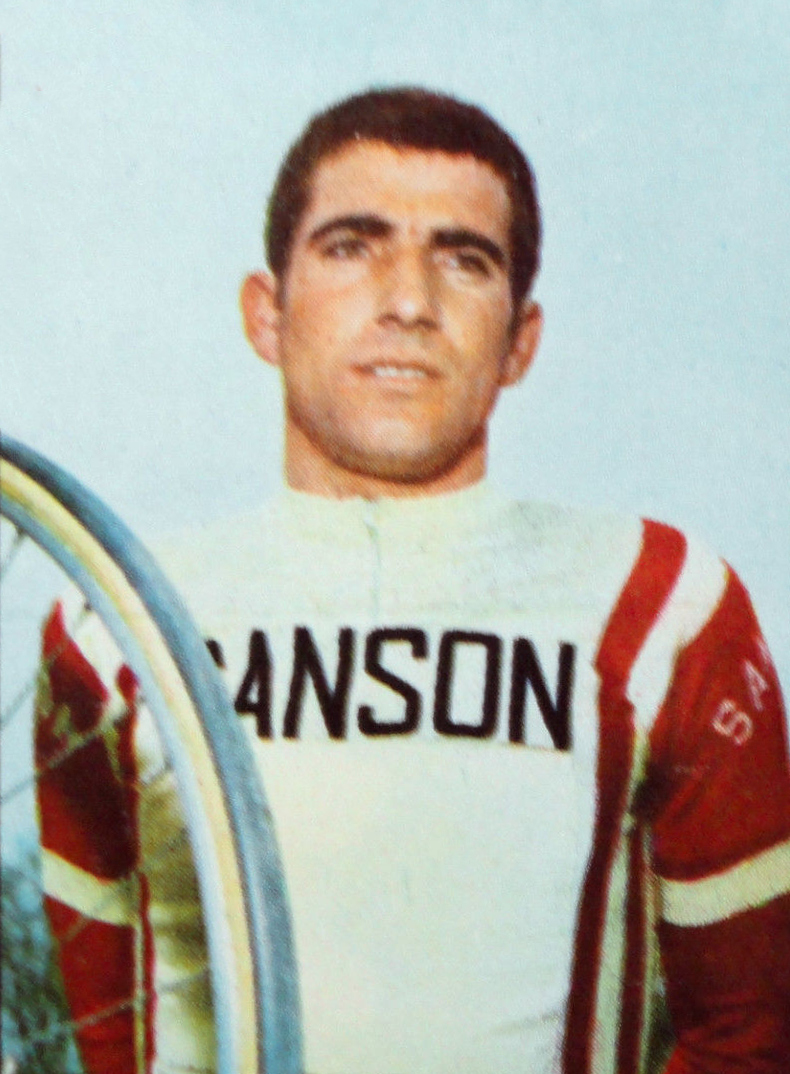
- Vittorio Marcelli wearing the team's jersey

Team information
- Registered: Italy
- Founded: 1969
- Disbanded: 1969
- Discipline: Road

Key personnel
- Team manager: Vendramino Bariviera

Team name history
- 1969: Sanson

Sanson was an Italian professional cycling team that existed for only the 1969 season. The team was one of several professional cycling teams throughout the 1960s and 1970s that were sponsored by Sanson Gelati, an Italian food producer.

== Major wins ==
Overall Tirreno–Adriatico, Carlo Chiappano
Milano–Vignola, Attilio Rota
Escalada a Montjuïc, Gianni Motta
Giro dell'Emilia, Gianni Motta
Stage 10 Giro d'Italia, Carlo Chiappano
