= Davide Boifava =

Italian cyclist

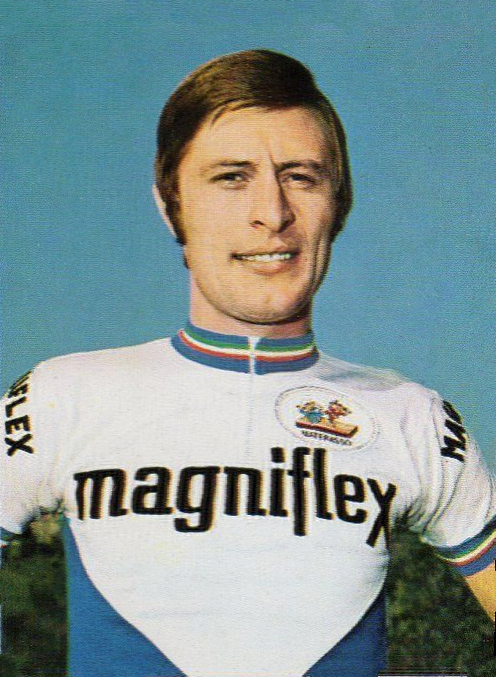
- Davide Boifava c. 1973

Personal information
- Full name: Davide Boifava
- Born: 14 November 1946 (age 79) Nuvolento, Italy

Cycling career
- Sport: Cycling
- Disciplines: Road, track
- Role: Rider, team manager

Professional teams
- 1969–1970: Molteni
- 1971: Scic
- 1972: Zonca
- 1973–1974: Magniflex
- 1975–1978: Furzi–FT

Managerial teams
- 1979–1996: Inoxpran
- 1997–1998: Asics–CGA
- 1999–2000: Riso Scotti–Vinavil
- 2001–2002: Tacconi Sport–Vini Caldirola
- 2003: Mercatone Uno–Scanavino
- 2004: Barloworld
- 2005–2006: Androni Giocattoli–3C Casalinghi
- 2007: Team LPR

Major wins
- Giro d'Italia, 2 stages

Davide Boifava (born 14 November 1946) is an Italian former professional road bicycle racer and cycling team manager.

== Major results ==
1966
1st Trofeo Alcide Degasperi
1968
1st Stage 2a Tour de l'Avenir
1969
1st Pursuit, National Track Championships
1st Overall Tour de Luxembourg
Giro d'Italia

1st Stage 2
Held after Stage 2

1st Overall Cronostafetta (TTT)

1st Stage 1 (ITT)

1st GP Marina di Massa-Pian della Fioba
2nd GP Montelupo
3rd Trofeo Baracchi (with Eddy Merckx)
3rd Grand Prix des Nations
1970
1st Giro della Romagna
2nd Overall Tour de Romandie
3rd Overall Tour de l'Oise
3rd Milano–Torino
4th Overall Giro di Sardegna
5th Trofeo Laigueglia
1971
1st Stage 12 (ITT) Giro d'Italia
2nd GP Forli
10th Overall Tirreno–Adriatico
1972
1st Trofeo Matteotti
1st GP Montelupo
2nd Trofeo Baracchi (with Felice Gimondi)
3rd Coppa Placci
4th Giro di Toscana
6th Tre Valli Varesine
7th Overall Tirreno–Adriatico
1973
1st Pursuit, National Track Championships
2nd Trofeo Baracchi (with Gösta Pettersson)
2nd Giro della Provincia di reggio Calabria
5th Overall Tirreno–Adriatico
6th Milano–Torino
9th Coppa Placci
1974
3rd Giro del Friuli
1975
3rd Gran Premio Città di Camaiore
9th Trofeo Matteotti
1976
3rd Trofeo Baracchi (with Jørgen Marcussen)

=== Grand Tour general classification results timeline ===
Grand Tour	1969	1970	1971	1972	1973	1974	1975	1976	1977	1978
Giro d'Italia	15	—	26	DNF	58	—	11	47	—	74
Tour de France	—	DNF	DNF	—	—	—	—	—	—	—
Vuelta a España	—	—	—	—	—	—	—	—	—	—
