= Adriano Pella =

Italian cyclist (1945–2013)

Personal information
- Born: 30 November 1945 Valdengo, Italy
- Died: 27 May 2013 (aged 67) Biella, Italy

Cycling career
- Sport: Cycling
- Discipline: Road
- Role: Rider

Professional teams
- 1970: Germanvox–Wega
- 1971–1972: Scic
- 1973–1976: Zonca
- 1977: Selle Royal

Adriano Pella (30 November 1945 – 27 May 2013) was an Italian racing cyclist. He rode in the 1971 Tour de France as well as in six editions of the Giro d'Italia.

== Major results ==
1970
1st Stage 8a Paris–Nice
7th Trofeo Baracchi (with Celestino Vercelli)
8th Trofeo Matteotti
9th Giro di Toscana
1971
5th Trofeo Matteotti
1974
6th Gran Premio Città di Camaiore
10th Giro del Friuli
1975
4th Coppa Sabatini
7th Trofeo Matteotti

=== Grand Tour general classification results timeline ===
Grand Tour	1970	1971	1972	1973	1974	1975	1976	1977
Giro d'Italia	DNF	—	—	67	38	30	51	106
Tour de France	—	78	—	—	—	—	55	—
Vuelta a España	DNF	—	—	—	—	—	—	—
