= Sagit (cycling team) =

Team information
- Registered: Italy
- Founded: 1969
- Disbanded: 1970
- Discipline: Road

Key personnel
- Team managers: Lodovico Lissoni; Pierino Baffi

Team name history
- 1969–1970: Sagit

Sagit was an Italian professional cycling team that existed from 1969 to 1970. The team competed in two editions of the Giro d'Italia.

== Major wins ==
1969
Stage 6 Giro d'Italia, Franco Cortinovis
