= Franco Cortinovis =

Italian cyclist

Personal information
- Born: 24 March 1945 (age 81)

Cycling career
- Sport: Cycling
- Role: Rider

Franco Cortinovis (born 24 March 1945) is an Italian racing cyclist. He won stage 6 of the 1969 Giro d'Italia.
