= Carlo Chiappano =

Italian cyclist

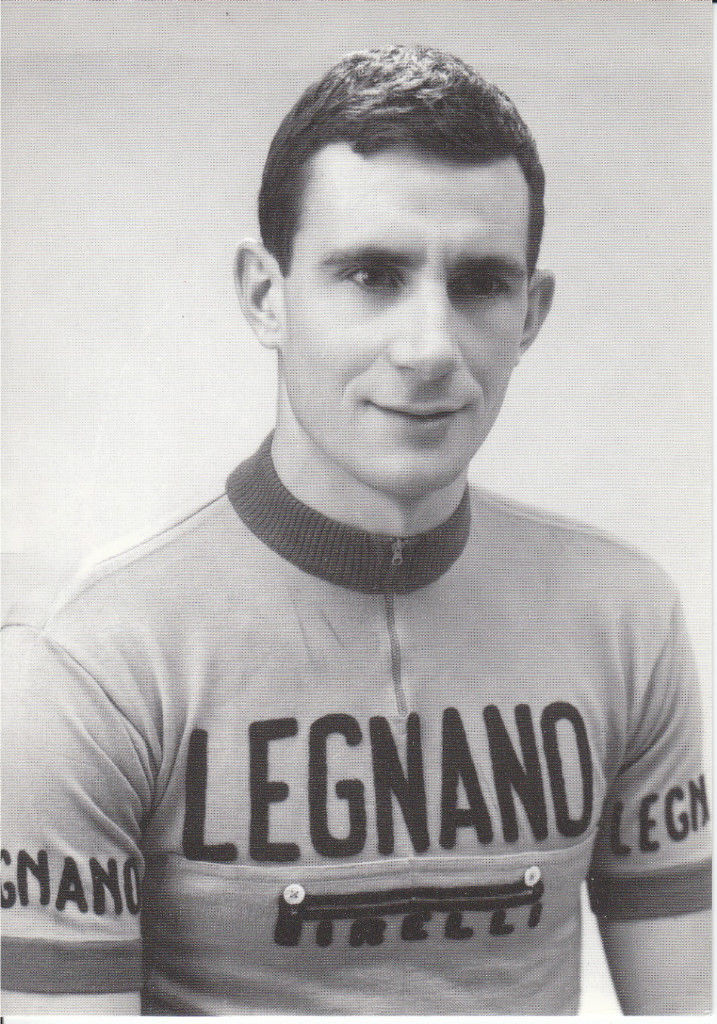

Personal information
- Born: 16 March 1941 Varzi, Italy
- Died: 7 July 1982 (aged 41) Casei Gerola, Italy

Cycling career
- Sport: Cycling
- Discipline: Road
- Role: Rider; Directeur sportif

Amateur team
- 1962: Legnano–Pirelli (stagiaire)

Professional teams
- 1963–1964: Legnano
- 1965–1966: Sanson
- 1967–1969: Salvarani
- 1969: Sanson
- 1970: Molteni
- 1971–1972: Scic

Managerial teams
- 1973–1979: Scic
- 1980–1981: Gis Gelati
- 1982: Del Tongo

Major wins
- Grand Tours Giro d'Italia 1 individual stage (1969) Stage races Tirreno–Adriatico (1969)

Carlo Chiappano (16 March 1941 – 7 July 1982) was an Italian racing cyclist. He won stage 10 of the 1969 Giro d'Italia. He also won the 1969 Tirreno–Adriatico. He rode in nine editions of the Giro d'Italia, as well as three editions of the Tour de France.

After retiring from cycling in 1972, he went on to work as a directeur sportif for several different teams until his death in a car accident in 1982.

== Major results ==
1963
2nd Milano–Torino
1964
10th Overall Giro di Sardegna
1965
Giro d'Italia

Held after Stage 2

2nd GP Cemab
1966
2nd Overall Tour de Suisse

1st Stage 2

1968
7th Trofeo Masferrer
1969
1st Overall Tirreno–Adriatico
1st Stage 10 Giro d'Italia
