= Renato Rota =

Italian cyclist

Personal information
- Born: 21 December 1946 (age 79)

Cycling career
- Sport: Cycling
- Role: Rider

Renato Rota (born 21 December 1946) is an Italian racing cyclist. He rode in the 1970 Tour de France.
