= Attilio Rota =

Italian cyclist

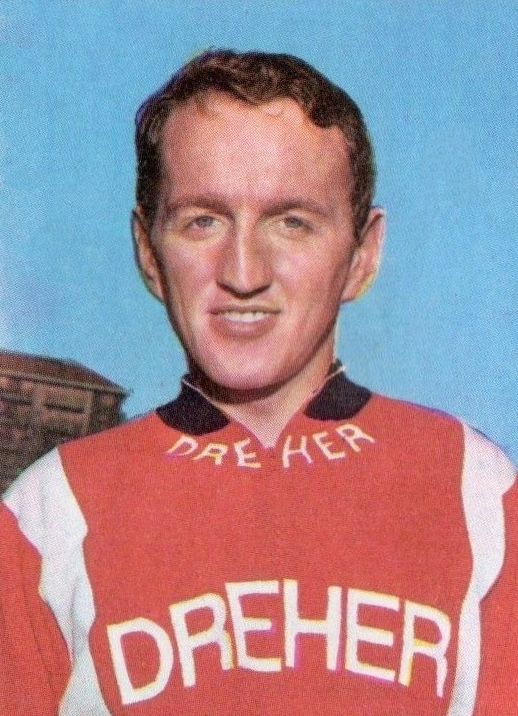
- Attilio Rota c. 1971

Personal information
- Born: 29 April 1945 (age 81) Clusone, Italy

Cycling career
- Sport: Cycling
- Current team: Retired
- Discipline: Road
- Role: Rider

Professional teams
- 1969: Sanson
- 1970–1974: Dreher
- 1975–1976: Scic
- 1977: Brooklyn
- 1978–1980: Sanson–Campagnolo

Attilio Rota (born 29 April 1945) is an Italian former professional racing cyclist. He rode in the 1974 and 1976 Tour de France as well as in eleven editions of the Giro d'Italia.

== Major results ==
1968
1st Gran Premio della Liberazione
1969
1st Milano–Vignola
3rd Giro di Toscana
8th Trofeo Baracchi (with Oliviero Morotti)
1970
2nd Sassari–Cagliari
2nd GP Alghero
5th Gran Premio Industria e Commercio di Prato
6th Gran Premio Città di Camaiore
9th Trofeo Baracchi (with Oliviero Morotti)
1973
6th Giro dell'Umbria
1974
10th Tre Valli Varesine
1977
3rd GP Industria & Artigianato

=== Grand Tour general classification results timeline ===
Grand Tour	1969	1970	1971	1972	1973	1974	1975	1976	1977	1978	1979	1980
Giro d'Italia	41	16	60	54	DNF	58	37	46	—	54	35	44
Tour de France	—	—	—	—	—	DNF	—	36	—	—	—	—
Vuelta a España	—	—	—	—	—	—	—	—	—	—	—	—
