= Pietro Tamiazzo =

Italian cyclist

Personal information
- Born: 5 April 1945 (age 81) Villanova del Sillaro

Cycling career
- Sport: Cycling
- Role: Rider

Pietro Tamiazzo (born 5 April 1945) is an Italian racing cyclist. He rode in the 1970 Tour de France.
