= Pietro Campagnari =

Italian cyclist

Personal information
- Born: 15 May 1941 (age 85) Verona

Cycling career
- Sport: Cycling
- Role: Rider

Pietro Campagnari (born 15 May 1941) is an Italian racing cyclist. He rode in the 1971 Tour de France.
