= Gris 2000 =

Team information
- Registered: Italy
- Founded: 1969
- Disbanded: 1969
- Discipline: Road

Key personnel
- Team manager: Diego Ronchini

Team name history
- 1969: Gris 2000

Gris 2000 was an Italian professional cycling team that existed only for the 1969 season. The team competed in the 1969 Giro d'Italia.
