= Giuseppe Grassi (cyclist) =

Italian cyclist

Personal information
- Born: 15 March 1942 (age 84) (Bariano) BG Italy

Sport
- Sport: Cycling
Medal record
Representing Italy
UCI Motor-paced World Championships
| Gold medal – first place | 1968 Rome | Amateurs |

Giuseppe Grassi (born 15 March 1942) is a retired cyclist from Italy. He won the UCI Motor-paced World Championships in 1968 and the Grand Prix Cemab road race in 1966.
