= 1969 Giro d'Italia =

Race details
- Dates: 16 May - 8 June 1969
- Stages: 23, including one split stage
- Distance: 3,851 km (2,393 mi)
- Winning time: 106h 47' 03"

Results
| Jersey awarded to the overall winner | Winner | Felice Gimondi (ITA) | (Salvarani) |
| | Second | Claudio Michelotto (ITA) | (Max Meyer) |
| | Third | Italo Zilioli (ITA) | (Filotex) |
| Jersey awarded to the points classification winner | Points | Franco Bitossi (ITA) | (Filotex) |
| | Mountains | Claudio Michelotto (ITA) | (Max Meyer) |
| | Team | Molteni | |

The 1969 Giro d'Italia was the 52nd edition of the Giro d'Italia, one of cycling's Grand Tours. The 3,851-kilometre (2,393 mi) race consisted of 23 stages, one of which was a split stage, starting in Garda on 16 May and finishing Milan on 8 June. There were two time trial stages and a single rest day. Felice Gimondi of the Salvarani team won the overall general classification, his second victory. Italians Claudio Michelotto (Max Meyer) placed second, 3 min and 35 s slower than Gimondi, and Italo Zilioli (Filotex) was third, over four minutes behind Gimondi.

Eddy Merckx, who was leading the general classification, was excluded from the race after an extremely controversial anti-doping control in Savona.

== Teams ==
Thirteen teams were invited by the race organizers to participate in the 1969 edition of the Giro d'Italia. Each team sent a squad of ten riders, so the Giro began with a peloton of 130 cyclists. Italian riders composed the majority of the starting peloton with 113 riders participating. The remaining participants were composed of the following nationalities: Belgium (7), Germany (3), Switzerland (3), and one apiece from Denmark, Luxembourg, and Spain. Of those starting, 61 were riding the Giro d'Italia for the first time. The average age of riders was 26.11 years, ranging from 20–year–old Giancarlo Tartoni (Gris 2000) to 35–year–old Aldo Moser (G.B.C.). The team with the youngest average rider age was Gris 2000 (24), while the oldest was G.B.C. (28). 81 made it to the finish in Milan.

The teams that took part in the race were:

- Eliolona
- Faema
- Ferretti
- Filotex
- G.B.C.
- Germanvox–Wega
- Gris 2000
- Max Meyer
- Molteni
- Sagit
- Salvarani
- Sanson
- Scic

== Pre-race favorites ==
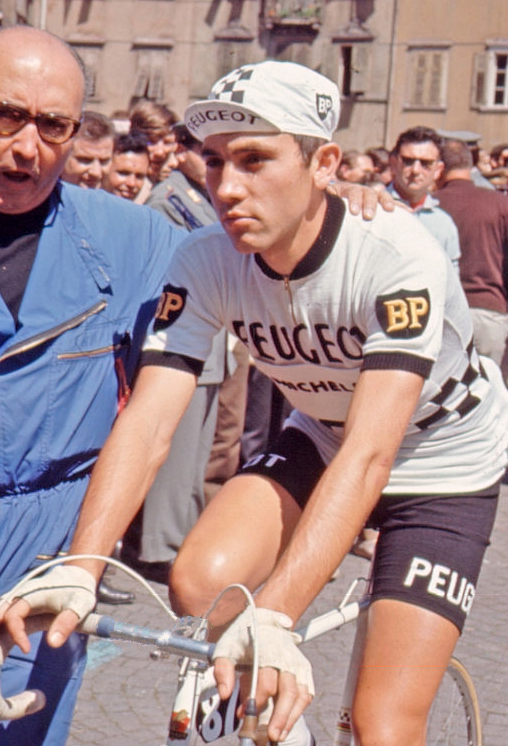
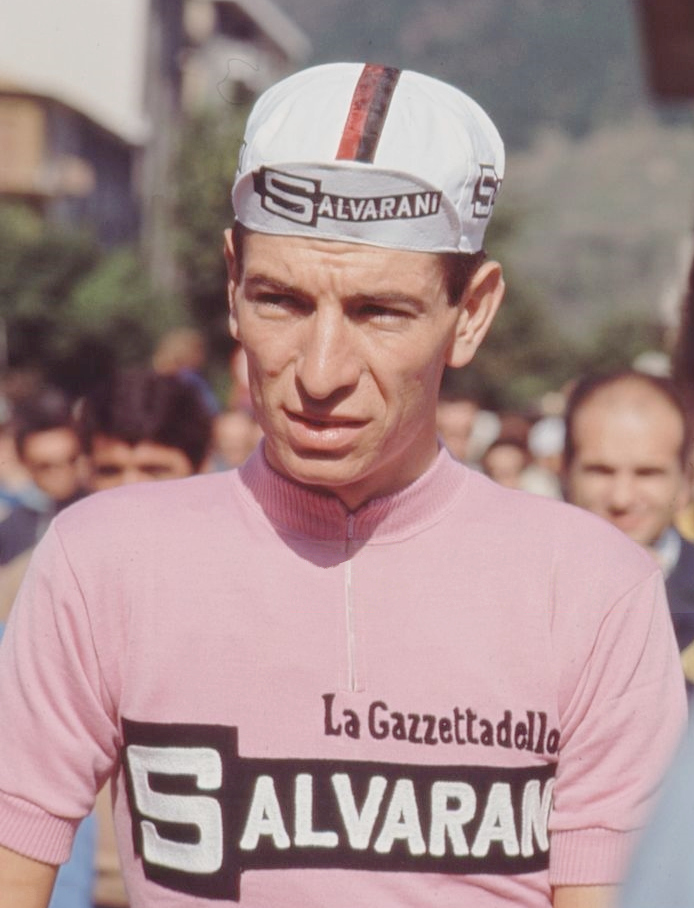
Eddy Merckx and Felice Gimondi (left and right, respectively, pictured at the 1967 Giro d'Italia) were viewed as the favorites to win the race. Gimondi had finished third in 1968, while Merckx won the race. Gimondi won the 1967 edition when Merckx finished seventh.

Eddy Merckx (Faema), the previous year's winner returned to defend his crown. He arrived in Italy amid a great season already with victories in the three Monuments Milan–San Remo, Tour of Flanders, and Liège–Bastogne–Liège. Merckx named Felice Gimondi (Salvarani) his top rival for the upcoming race. Both Merckx and 1967 champion Gimondi were viewed as the principal favorites to win the race. Gimondi had won the Tour de Romandie and placed second in the Tour of Flanders. Both riders hoped to achieve the Giro–Tour double, for the first time since Jacques Anquetil achieved it in 1964. Gimondi had previously attempted the feat in 1965 and 1967. Merckx had specifically hoped to ride a conservative race in order to help his chances to complete the double.

Reigning world champion Vittorio Adorni (Scic) who placed second the year before was viewed as a rider who could challenge the Gimondi–Merckx duel, despite being winless that season so far. Filotex's Italo Zilioli and Franco Bitossi were other riders who were speculated to challenge for high general classification positions. Top sprinters entering the race were Molteni's Michele Dancelli and Marino Basso.

Spanish and French rider participation was lacking, as the former had only a single team entered and there were zero French riders competing. Notable absences included Gianni Motta and Franco Balmamion.

== Route and stages ==
The route was revealed on 27 March 1969 by race director Vincenzo Torriani. The announced route covered 4,092 km (2,543 mi), across twenty-four stages of racing. The average stage length for this edition was 170 km (106 mi). In total the route traversed 600 municipalities over 44 provinces. The route featured 26 categorized climbs that awarded points for the mountains classification, including eight of which were being scaled for the first time in race history. Five of those climbs would be stage finishes for the race. Four climbs were over 2,000 m (6,562 ft), while the whole race climbed a total of 29.8 km (19 mi). The route started flat before the first important stages pertaining to the general classification would be in the ninth and tenth stages. The rest day took place in San Marino on 31 May.

The race started in Garda and made its way south and west across the Apennines. Then the race headed south until Potenza before turning north until reaching San Marino for two stages. The race transferred to Parma and headed east again and entered the Dolomites. Traversing the Dolomites, the race headed west until its finish in Milan.

Stage results
| Stage | Date | Course | Distance | Type | Winner |
|---|---|---|---|---|---|
| 1 | 16 May | Garda to Brescia | 142 km (88 mi) | Plain stage | Giancarlo Polidori (ITA) |
| 2 | 17 May | Brescia to Mirandola | 180 km (112 mi) | Plain stage | Davide Boifava (ITA) |
| 3 | 18 May | Mirandola to Montecatini Terme | 188 km (117 mi) | Stage with mountain(s) | Eddy Merckx (BEL) |
| 4 | 19 May | Montecatini Terme to Montecatini Terme | 21 km (13 mi) | Individual time trial | Eddy Merckx (BEL) |
| 5 | 20 May | Montecatini Terme to Follonica | 194 km (121 mi) | Plain stage | Albert Van Vlierberghe (BEL) |
| 6 | 21 May | Follonica to Viterbo | 198 km (123 mi) | Plain stage | Franco Cortinovis (ITA) |
| 7 | 22 May | Viterbo to Terracina | 206 km (128 mi) | Plain stage | Eddy Merckx (BEL) |
| 8 | 23 May | Terracina to Naples | 133 km (83 mi) | Plain stage | Marino Basso (ITA) |
| 9 | 24 May | Naples to Potenza | 173 km (107 mi) | Plain stage | Michele Dancelli (ITA) |
| 10 | 25 May | Potenza to Campitello Matese | 254 km (158 mi) | Stage with mountain(s) | Carlo Chiappano (ITA) |
| 11 | 26 May | Campobasso to Scanno | 165 km (103 mi) | Stage with mountain(s) | Franco Bitossi (ITA) |
| 12 | 27 May | Scanno to Silvi Marina | 180 km (112 mi) | Stage with mountain(s) | Ugo Colombo (ITA) |
| 13 | 28 May | Silvi Marina to Senigallia | 166 km (103 mi) | Plain stage | Marino Basso (ITA) |
| 14 | 29 May | Senigallia to City of San Marino (San Marino) | 185 km (115 mi) | Stage with mountain(s) | Franco Bitossi (ITA) |
| 15 | 30 May | Cesenatico to City of San Marino (San Marino) | 49.3 km (31 mi) | Individual time trial | Eddy Merckx (BEL) |
| | 31 May | Rest day | | | |
| 16 | 1 June | Parma to Savona | 234 km (145 mi) | Stage with mountain(s) | Roberto Ballini (ITA) |
| 17 | 2 June | Celle Ligure to Pavia | 182 km (113 mi) | Plain stage | Ole Ritter (DEN) |
| 18a | 3 June | Pavia to Zingonia | 115 km (71 mi) | Plain stage | Marino Basso (ITA) |
| 18b | 3 June | Zingonia to San Pellegrino Terme | 100 km (62 mi) | Stage with mountain(s) | Marino Basso (ITA) |
| 19 | 4 June | San Pellegrino Terme to Folgaria | 248 km (154 mi) | Stage with mountain(s) | Italo Zilioli (ITA) |
| 20 | 5 June | Trento to Marmolada | 230 km (143 mi) | Plain stage | Stage Cancelled |
| 21 | 6 June | Rocca Pietore to Cavalese | 131 km (81 mi) | Stage with mountain(s) | Claudio Michelotto (ITA) |
| 22 | 7 June | Cavalese to Folgarida | 150 km (93 mi) | Stage with mountain(s) | Vittorio Adorni (ITA) |
| 23 | 8 June | Folgarida to Milan | 257 km (160 mi) | Stage with mountain(s) | Attilio Benfatto (ITA) |
| | Total | | 3,851 km (2,393 mi) | | |

== Race overview ==
The twentieth stage of the race from Trento to Marmolada started at 8:30 AM local time and by around 1 PM the weather was worsening and this lead race organizers to change the route in order to go through Fiera di Primiero. However, the weather there was even worse and the Torriani elected to neutralize the stage after 104 km (65 mi) of racing.

Following Merckx's disqualification from the race, there were rumors of riders protests. The race started an hour later than intended and the race stopped briefly in front of Merckx's hotel in an act of solidarity. Gimondi, who was promoted to first place, refused to wear the pink jersey during the seventeenth stage. However, the stage went on and the winning breakaway started roughly 30 kilometers from the race finish, with Ole Ritter attacking to win ahead of the fifteen other riders in the move. The mood of the peloton and the race's caravan was described as dismayed.

=== Doping ===
The race had doping controls and the top two riders in the general classification were drug tested after each stage, along with two other cyclists chosen at random. A mobile lab that traveled with the race and conducted the drug tests.

I'm sure ... I'm convinced of it ... I didn't take anything ... It's the truth. Never, never have I taken anything.

— Eddy Merckx following as he spoke to reporters from his hotel room

On 2 June, it was announced that the race leader Merckx had tested positive. Merckx's first test came up positive for fencamfamine, an amphetamine and a second test confirmed the positive. The word spread about Merckx's positive test while Merckx himself was still asleep. The media was able to enter Merckx's room at the Albissola Superiore as the news broke to him, where he stated "I'm sure I didn't take any doping product," as he cried on his hotel bed. Fellow riders, including Gimondi, and team directors stopped by to express their solidarity with Merckx as he faced the news.

The positive test meant Merckx was to be suspended for a month. Race director Vincenzo Torriani delayed the start of the seventeenth stage in an attempt to persuade the president of the Italian Cycling Federation to allow Merckx to begin the stage. However, the president was not in his office and Torriani was forced to start the stage, disqualifying Merckx in the process. Union Cycliste Internationale (UCI) president Adriano Rodoni announced an investigation into the situation, which, in the succeeding days, resulted in the removal of the suspension.

The reaction to Merckx's expulsion was wide. Many writers sided with Merckx stating how he tested negative every other time in the race to that point before the positive on his final test. (Note: One source states he took eight tests, while the other states he took eleven.) Several pointed to his clean track record and willingness to take doping controls whenever approached. A writer made note that it was widely known that riders took stimulants at the time, otherwise the pace of racing could not be kept at what it was at the time. At the time the list of banned substances varied from country to country. There were some riders that threatened to strike at the start of the seventeenth stage. Some writers stated that the Giro was over at that point, and one went as far as to say that this might be the death of the Giro. There were hypotheses that he had consumed tainted food. Fellow cyclists also sided with Merckx, Taccone stated "It was sabotage, while Gimondi commented that if he were to win the race overall, it would have no meaning since he could not best Merckx. On the other hand, Rudi Altig told the media: "The law must be respected. If it had been a runner in the background, there would be no scandal. He would have been disqualified without any other form of trial. Merckx, on the other hand, is the victim, and that is why the case is experiencing such a twist." Former cyclist Marino Vigna and Faema co–director mentioned that Merckx could not have taken a tampered bottle from the ‘’tifosi’’ as he warned Merckx “from the start of the Giro against the danger of refueling during the stage by the public,” further saying that Merckx never accepted bottles from fans. However, he did say that Merckx could have gotten a bottle from a teammate that got one from a spectator.

== Classification leadership ==
Two different jerseys were worn during the 1969 Giro d'Italia. The leader of the general classification – calculated by adding the stage finish times of each rider – wore a pink jersey. This classification is the most important of the race, and its winner is considered as the winner of the Giro.

For the points classification, which awarded a red jersey to its leader, cyclists were given points for finishing a stage in the top 15; there was no distinction in stage types.

A third classification was the mountains classification. For this, the climbs were ranked in first and second categories; double points were given on the Cima Coppi, the highest place in the Giro. In this ranking, points were won by reaching the summit of a climb ahead of other cyclists. No jersey was worn by its leader.

There was also one classification for the teams, based on points, named the Ramazzotti classification. Riders scored points for their team if they were amongst the first 15 to finish a stage, at intermediate sprints, and mountain tops, and for leading the general classification.

A minor classification was the intermediate sprints classification, called the traguardi tricolori. On intermediate sprints, the first rider received 30 points for this classification, and the second rider 10 points. No jersey was used to indicate the leader. There was no time bonus at these intermediate sprints, and no points for the points classification.

In 1969, there was an additional classification called the Minigiro. Midway on every stage, there was a location where the cyclists were timed, and these times were combined in the same way as the general classification.

After every stage, the cyclist who gained the most places in the general classification was given a special prize.

Classification leadership by stage
| Stage | Winner | General classification | Points classification | Mountains classification | Intermediate sprints classification | Minigiro classification | Team classification |
|---|---|---|---|---|---|---|---|
| 1 | Giancarlo Polidori | Giancarlo Polidori | Giancarlo Polidori | not awarded | Virginio Levati | ? | Molteni |
| 2 | Davide Boifava | Davide Boifava | Giancarlo Polidori | not awarded | multiple riders | Roberto Ballini | Molteni |
| 3 | Eddy Merckx | Giancarlo Polidori | Giancarlo Polidori | Eddy Merckx | multiple riders | Daminiano Capodivento | Molteni |
| 4 | Eddy Merckx | Giancarlo Polidori | Eddy Merckx | Eddy Merckx | multiple riders | Ottavio Crepaldi | Molteni |
| 5 | Albert Van Vlierberghe | Giancarlo Polidori | Eddy Merckx | Eddy Merckx | Michele Dancelli | ? | Molteni |
| 6 | Franco Cortinovis | Giancarlo Polidori | Eddy Merckx | Eddy Merckx | Michele Dancelli | Vittorio Marcelli | Molteni |
| 7 | Eddy Merckx | Giancarlo Polidori | Eddy Merckx | Eddy Merckx | Benito Pigato | Vittorio Marcelli | Molteni |
| 8 | Marino Basso | Giancarlo Polidori | Eddy Merckx | Eddy Merckx | multiple riders | Vittorio Marcelli | Molteni |
| 9 | Michele Dancelli | Eddy Merckx | Eddy Merckx | Eddy Merckx | Lucillo Lievore | Vittorio Marcelli | Molteni |
| 10 | Carlo Chiappano | Eddy Merckx | Eddy Merckx | Eddy Merckx & Carlo Chiappano | Lucillo Lievore | Pietro Tamiazzo | Molteni |
| 11 | Franco Bitossi | Eddy Merckx | Eddy Merckx | Franco Bitossi | Lucillo Lievore | Pietro Tamiazzo | Molteni |
| 12 | Ugo Colombo | Silvano Schiavon | Eddy Merckx | Michele Dancelli | Michele Dancelli | Pietro Tamiazzo | Molteni |
| 13 | Marino Basso | Silvano Schiavon | Eddy Merckx | Michele Dancelli | Michele Dancelli | Pietro Tamiazzo | Molteni |
| 14 | Franco Bitossi | Eddy Merckx | Franco Bitossi | Michele Dancelli | Michele Dancelli | Pietro Tamiazzo | Molteni |
| 15 | Eddy Merckx | Eddy Merckx | Eddy Merckx | Michele Dancelli | Michele Dancelli | Pietro Tamiazzo | Molteni |
| 16 | Roberto Ballini | Eddy Merckx | Eddy Merckx | Michele Dancelli | Michele Dancelli | Pietro Tamiazzo | Molteni |
| 17 | Ole Ritter | Felice Gimondi | Franco Bitossi | Michele Dancelli | multiple riders | Pietro Tamiazzo | Molteni |
| 18a | Marino Basso | Felice Gimondi | Franco Bitossi | Michele Dancelli | multiple riders | Pietro Tamiazzo | Molteni |
| 18b | Marino Basso | Felice Gimondi | Franco Bitossi | Michele Dancelli | multiple riders | Pietro Tamiazzo | Molteni |
| 19 | Italo Zilioli | Felice Gimondi | Franco Bitossi | Michele Dancelli | multiple riders | Pietro Tamiazzo | Molteni |
| 20 | Stage Cancelled | Felice Gimondi | Franco Bitossi | Michele Dancelli | multiple riders | Pietro Tamiazzo | Molteni |
| 21 | Claudio Michelotto | Felice Gimondi | Franco Bitossi | Claudio Michellotto | multiple riders | Pietro Tamiazzo | Molteni |
| 22 | Vittorio Adorni | Felice Gimondi | Franco Bitossi | Claudio Michellotto | multiple riders | Pietro Tamiazzo | Molteni |
| 23 | Attilio Benfatto | Felice Gimondi | Franco Bitossi | Claudio Michellotto | Michele Dancelli | Pietro Tamiazzo | Molteni |
| Final | | Felice Gimondi | Franco Bitossi | Claudio Michellotto | Michele Dancelli | Pietro Tamiazzo | Molteni |

== Final standings ==
Legend
| Pink jersey | Denotes the winner of the General classification |
| Red jersey | Denotes the winner of the Points classification |

=== General classification ===
Final general classification (1–10)
| Rank | Name | Team | Time |
|---|---|---|---|
| 1 | Felice Gimondi (ITA) | Salvarani | 128h 4' 27" |
| 2 | Claudio Michelotto (ITA) | Max Meyer | + 3' 35" |
| 3 | Italo Zilioli (ITA) | Filotex | + 4' 48" |
| 4 | Silvano Schiavon (ITA) | Sanson | + 7' 01" |
| 5 | Ugo Colombo (ITA) | Filotex | + 11' 54" |
| 6 | Michele Dancelli (ITA) | Molteni | + 14' 05" |
| 7 | Aldo Moser (ITA) | G.B.C. | + 20' 05" |
| 8 | Primo Mori (ITA) | Max Meyer | + 20' 25" |
| 9 | Rudi Altig (FRG) | Salvarani | + 23' 57" |
| 10 | Franco Bitossi (ITA) | Filotex | + 31' 36" |

=== Mountains classification ===
Final mountains classification (1–10)
| Rank | Name | Team | Points |
|---|---|---|---|
| 1 | Claudio Michelotto (ITA) | Max Meyer | 330 |
| 2 | Italo Zilioli (ITA) | Filotex | 250 |
| 3 | Felice Gimondi (ITA) | Salvarani | 230 |
| 4 | Michele Dancelli (ITA) | Molteni | 220 |
| 5 | Ugo Colombo (ITA) | Filotex | 130 |
| 5 | Silvano Schiavon (ITA) | Sanson | 130 |
| 7 | Julio Jiménez (ESP) | Eliolona | 120 |
| 8 | Franco Bitossi (ITA) | Filotex | 100 |
| 9 | Vittorio Adorni (ITA) | Scic | 80 |
| 10 | Wladimiro Panizza (ITA) | Salvarani | 60 |

=== Points classification ===
Final points classification (1–10)
| Rank | Name | Team | Points |
|---|---|---|---|
| 1 | Franco Bitossi (ITA) | Filotex | 182 |
| 2 | Marino Basso (ITA) | Molteni | 166 |
| 3 | Michele Dancelli (ITA) | Molteni | 129 |
| 4 | Felice Gimondi (ITA) | Salvarani | 126 |
| 5 | Luigi Sgarbozza (ITA) | Max Meyer | 118 |
| 6 | Italo Zilioli (ITA) | Filotex | 107 |
| 7 | Ugo Colombo (ITA) | Filotex | 103 |
| 8 | Silvano Schiavon (ITA) | Sanson | 98 |
| 9 | Dino Zandegù (ITA) | Salvarani | 95 |
| 10 | Rudi Altig (FRG) | Salvarani | 90 |

=== Neoprofessional classification ===
Final neoprofessional classification (1–10)
| Rank | Name | Team | Time |
|---|---|---|---|
| 1 | Primo Mori (ITA) | Max Meyer | 107h 07' 28" |
| 2 | Davide Boifava (ITA) | Molteni | + 26' 57" |
| 3 | Enrico Maggioni (ITA) | Molteni | + 33' 08" |
| 4 | Giovanni Cavalcanti (ITA) | Gris 2000 | + 40' 55" |
| 5 | Matteo Cravero (ITA) | Sanson | + 46' 42" |
| 6 | Marcello Bergamo (ITA) | Filotex | + 48' 01" |
| 7 | Oliviero Morotti (ITA) | Sagit | + 1h 01' 54" |
| 8 | Giuseppe Scopel (ITA) | Max Meyer | + 1h 25' 46" |
| 9 | Arturo Pecchielan (ITA) | Molteni | + 1h 31' 36" |
| 10 | Attilio Rota (ITA) | Sanson | + 1h 39' 24" |

=== Teams classification ===
Final team classification (1–10)
| Rank | Team | Points |
|---|---|---|
| 1 | Molteni | 4871 |
| 2 | Filotex | 3663 |
| 3 | Salvarani | 3332 |
| 4 | Faema | 3155 |
| 5 | Max Meyer | 3128 |
| 6 | Sanson | 2248 |
| 7 | Scic | 2138 |
| 8 | Eliolona | 1114 |
| 9 | G.B.C. | 1059 |
| 10 | Germanvox | 1039 |

=== Intermediate sprints classification ===
Final intermediate sprints classification (1–10)
| Rank | Name | Team | Points |
|---|---|---|---|
| 1 | Michele Dancelli (ITA) | Molteni | 150 |
| 2 | Lucillo Lievore (ITA) | Eliolona | 120 |
| 3 | Silvano Schiavon (ITA) | Sanson | 60 |
| 4 | Pietro Tamiazzo (ITA) | Max Meyer | 60 |
| 5 | Virginio Levati (ITA) | Sagit | 50 |
| 6 | Mario Bettazzoli (ITA) | Eliolona | 50 |
| 7 | Enrico Paolini (ITA) | Scic | 40 |
| 8 | Ercole Gualazzini (ITA) | Max Meyer | 40 |
| 9 | Sandro Quintarelli (ITA) | Gris 2000 | 40 |
| 10 | Luciano Armani (ITA) | Scic | 40 |
