= Ugo Colombo (cyclist) =

Italian cyclist (1940–2019)

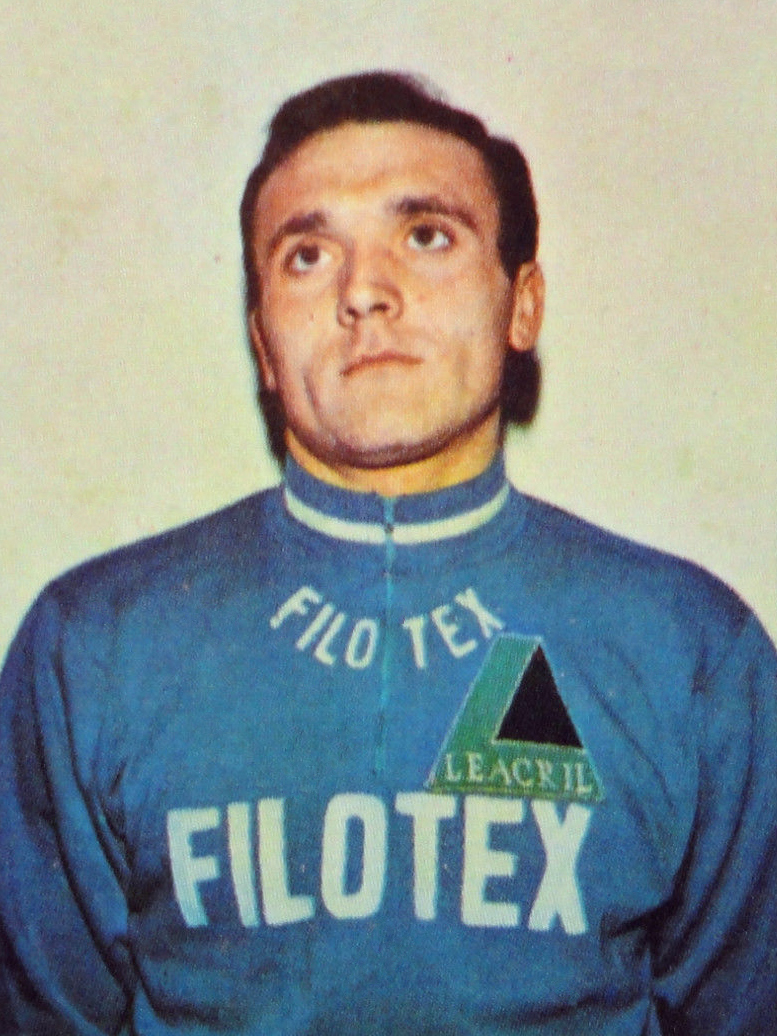
- Ugo Colombo c. 1969

Personal information
- Full name: Ugo Colombo
- Born: 22 February 1940 San Giorgio su Legnano, Milan, Italy
- Died: 10 October 2019 (aged 79) Pontremoli, Tuscany, Italy

Cycling career
- Sport: Cycling
- Discipline: Road
- Role: Rider

Professional teams
- 1964: Springoil-Fuchs
- 1965–1974: Filotex

Major wins
- Giro d'Italia, 3 stages; GP Montelupo (1968); Coppa Placci (1970, 1971)

Ugo Colombo (22 February 1940 – 10 October 2019) was an Italian racing cyclist. He rode the Giro d'Italia in 1964–1974 with Filotex, with the best result of third place in 1971, and the Tour de France in 1966–1968, placing tenth in 1968.

== Grand Tour results timeline ==
	1964	1965	1966	1967	1968	1969	1970	1971	1972	1973	1974
Giro d'Italia	39	23	18	DNF	36	5	17	3	23	DNF	39
Stages won	0	0	0	0	0	1	0	0	1	0	0
Tour de France	DNE	DNE	44	34	10	DNE	DNE	DNE	DNE	DNE	DNE
Stages won	—	—	0	0	0	—	—	—	—	—	—
Vuelta a España	N/A	N/A	N/A	N/A	N/A	N/A	N/A	N/A	N/A	N/A	N/A
Stages won	N/A	N/A	N/A	N/A	N/A	N/A	N/A	N/A	N/A	N/A	N/A

Legend
1	Winner
2–3	Top three-finish
4–10	Top ten-finish
11–	Other finish
DNE	Did not enter
DNF-x	Did not finish (retired on stage x)
DNS-x	Did not start (not started on stage x)
HD-x	Finished outside time limit (occurred on stage x)
DSQ	Disqualified
N/A	Race/classification not held
NR	Not ranked in this classification
