= Arturo Pecchielan =

Italian cyclist

Personal information
- Born: 11 April 1944 (age 82)

Cycling career
- Sport: Cycling
- Role: Rider

Arturo Pecchielan (born 11 April 1944) is an Italian racing cyclist. He rode in the 1970 Tour de France.
