= Romano Tumellero =

Italian cyclist

Personal information
- Born: 2 February 1948 (age 78) Arcugnano, Italy

Cycling career
- Sport: Cycling
- Current team: Retired
- Discipline: Road
- Role: Rider

Professional teams
- 1969–1970: Ferretti
- 1971: Molteni
- 1972: Dreher
- 1973: Jollj Ceramica

Romeno Tumellero (born 2 February 1948 in Arcugnano) is an Italian former cyclist.

== Major results ==
1965
3rd National Road Race Championships
1967
1st Trofeo Alcide Degasperi
1969
1st Coppa Sabatini
1970
3rd Giro di Toscana
3rd GP Montelupo
1971
1st Stage 4 Tour de Romandie
1st Stage 8 Giro d'Italia
2nd Züri-Metzgete
1972
2nd Sassari-Cagliari
