= Giro di Toscana =

Road bicycle race held annually in Tuscany, Italy

Race details
- Date: Late April–Early May (1923–2014); September (2016– )
- Region: Tuscany, Italy
- English name: Tour of Tuscany
- Local name: Giro di Toscana (in Italian)
- Discipline: Road
- Competition: UCI Europe Tour
- Type: One-day (1923–2014); Two-day (2016– )
- Organiser: Comitato Sportivo Città di Arezzo
- Web site: www.girodellatoscana.com

History
- First edition: 1923
- Editions: 98 (as of 2026)
- First winner: Costante Girardengo (ITA)
- Most wins: Gino Bartali (ITA) (5 wins)
- Most recent: Giulio Pellizzari (ITA)

The Giro di Toscana is a road bicycle race held annually in Tuscany, Italy. From 2005 to 2014, the race has been organised as a 1.1 event on the UCI Europe Tour. The race was not held in 2015. On 4 April 2016 it was announced that the race will return in September 2016 as a three-race challenge (similar to the Trittico Lombardo or Vuelta a Mallorca), consisting in three one-day races held consecutively in Tuscany. Each race will award points to the best placed riders, and the rider who score most points will win the overall classification of Giro della Toscana. This new edition will be named Giro della Toscana – Memorial Alfredo Martini, in memory of Alfredo Martini, former cyclist and coach of the Italy national cycling team.

== Winners ==
Year	Country	Rider	Team
1923	Italy	Costante Girardengo	Maino
1924	Italy	Costante Girardengo	Maino
1925	Italy	Nello Ciaccheri	Legnano–Pirelli
1926	Italy	Alfredo Binda	Legnano–Pirelli
1927	Italy	Alfredo Binda	Legnano–Pirelli
1928	Italy	Alessandro Catalani	Wolsit–Pirelli
1929	Italy	Leonida Frascarelli	Ideor
1930	Italy	Pio Caimmi	Gloria–Hutchinson
1931	No race		
1932	Italy	Learco Guerra	Maino-Clement
1933	No race		
1934	Italy	Mario Cipriani	Fréjus
1935	Italy	Mario Cipriani	Fréjus
1936	Italy	Giovanni Cazzulani	Gloria
1937	Italy	Olimpio Bizzi	Fréjus
1938	Italy	Mario Vicini	Lygie–Settebello
1939	Italy	Gino Bartali	Legnano
1940	Italy	Gino Bartali	Legnano
1941	Italy	Fausto Coppi	Legnano
1942	Italy	Vito Ortelli	Bianchi
1943	Italy	Olimpio Bizzi	Bianchi
1944	No race		
1945	No race		
1946	Italy	Aldo Ronconi	Benotto–Superga
1947	Italy	Bruno Pasquini	Legnano
1948	Italy	Gino Bartali	Legnano
1949	Italy	Fiorenzo Magni	Willier Trestina
1950	Italy	Gino Bartali	Bartali-Gardiol
1951	Italy	Loretto Petrucci	Bianchi–Pirelli
1952	Italy	Rinaldo Moresco	Arbos–Pirelli
1953	Italy	Gino Bartali	Bartali
1954	Italy	Fiorenzo Magni	Nivea–Fuchs
1955	Italy	Arrigo Padovan	
1956	Italy	Nello Fabbri	Legnano
1957	Italy	Alfredo Sabbadin	San Pellegrino
1958	Belgium	Willy Vannitsen	Ghigi–Coppi
1959	Italy	Adriano Zamboni	Torpado-Clement
1960	Italy	Nino Defilippis	Carpano
1961	Italy	Marino Fontana	San Pellegrino
1962	Italy	Guido Carlesi	Philco
1963	Italy	Vito Taccone	Lygie
1964	Italy	Giorgio Zancanaro (cyclist)	Carpano
1965	Italy	Luciano Sambi	Legnano
1966	West Germany	Rudi Altig	Molteni
1967	Italy	Franco Balmamion	Molteni
1968	Italy	Franco Bitossi	Filotex
1969	Italy	Giorgio Favaro	Filotex
1970	Italy	Gianfranco Bianchin	Molteni
1971	Italy	Giancarlo Polidori	Scic
1972	Switzerland	Joseph Fuchs	Filotex
1973	Belgium	Roger De Vlaeminck	Brooklyn
1974	Italy	Francesco Moser	Filotex
1975	Italy	Tino Conti	Furzi-FT
1976	Italy	Francesco Moser	Sanson
1977	Italy	Francesco Moser	Sanson
1978	Italy	Giuseppe Perletto	Magniflex–Torpado
1979	Italy	Mario Noris	Sapa
1980	Italy	Nazzareno Berto	Inoxpran
1981	Italy	Gianbattista Baronchelli	Bianchi–Piaggio
1982	Italy	Francesco Moser	Famcucine
1983	Belgium	Fons De Wolf	Bianchi–Piaggio
1984	Italy	Gianbattista Baronchelli	Murella–Rossin
1985	Italy	Ezio Moroni	Atala
1986	Italy	Claudio Corti	Supermercati Brianzoli
1987	Italy	Renato Piccolo	Gewiss–Bianchi
1988	United States	Ron Kiefel	7 Eleven
1989	Italy	Maurizio Fondriest	Del Tongo
1990	Italy	Marco Saligari	Ariostea
1991	Italy	Massimiliano Lelli	Ariostea
1992	Italy	Giorgio Furlan	Ariostea
1993	Italy	Massimiliano Lelli	Ariostea
1994	Italy	Francesco Casagrande	Mercatone Uno–Medeghini
1995	Italy	Massimo Podenzana	Brescialat–Fago
1996	No race		
1997	Italy	Sergio Barbero	Mercatone Uno
1998	Italy	Francesco Secchiari	Scrigno–Gaerne
1999	Italy	Luca Scinto	Mapei–Quick Step
2000	Moldova	Ruslan Ivanov	Amica Chips–Tassoni Sport
2001	Slovenia	Gorazd Štangelj	Liquigas–Pata
2002	Kazakhstan	Alexandre Shefer	Alessio
2003	Italy	Rinaldo Nocentini	Formaggi Pinzolo Fiavè
2004	Italy	Matteo Tosatto	Fassa Bortolo
2005	Italy	Daniele Bennati	Lampre–Caffita
2006	Poland	Przemysław Niemiec	Miche
2007	Italy	Vincenzo Nibali	Liquigas
2008	Italy	Mattia Gavazzi	Preti Mangimi
2009	Italy	Alessandro Petacchi	LPR Brakes–Farnese Vini
2010	Italy	Daniele Bennati	Liquigas–Doimo
2011	Ireland	Dan Martin	Garmin–Cervélo
2012	Italy	Alessandro Ballan	BMC Racing Team
2013	Italy	Mattia Gavazzi	Androni Giocattoli–Venezuela
2014	Netherlands	Pieter Weening	Orica–GreenEDGE
2015	No race		
2016	Italy	Daniele Bennati	Italy National Team
2017	France	Guillaume Martin	Wanty–Groupe Gobert
2018	Italy	Gianni Moscon	Team Sky
2019	Italy	Giovanni Visconti	Neri Sottoli–Selle Italia–KTM
2020	Colombia	Fernando Gaviria	UAE Team Emirates
2021	Denmark	Michael Valgren	EF Education–Nippo
2022	Switzerland	Marc Hirschi	UAE Team Emirates
2023	France	Pavel Sivakov	INEOS Grenadiers
2024	France	Clément Champoussin	Arkéa–B&B Hotels
2025	Mexico	Isaac del Toro	UAE Team Emirates XRG

== See also ==
- Giro della Toscana Int. Femminile – Memorial Michela Fanini
