= Renato Laghi =

Italian cyclist (born 1944)

Personal information
- Born: 8 December 1944 (age 81) Faenza

Cycling career
- Sport: Cycling
- Role: Rider

Renato Laghi (born 8 December 1944) is an Italian racing cyclist. He won stage 19 of the 1977 Giro d'Italia.
