= G.B.C. (cycling team) =

Cycling team (1963-1977)

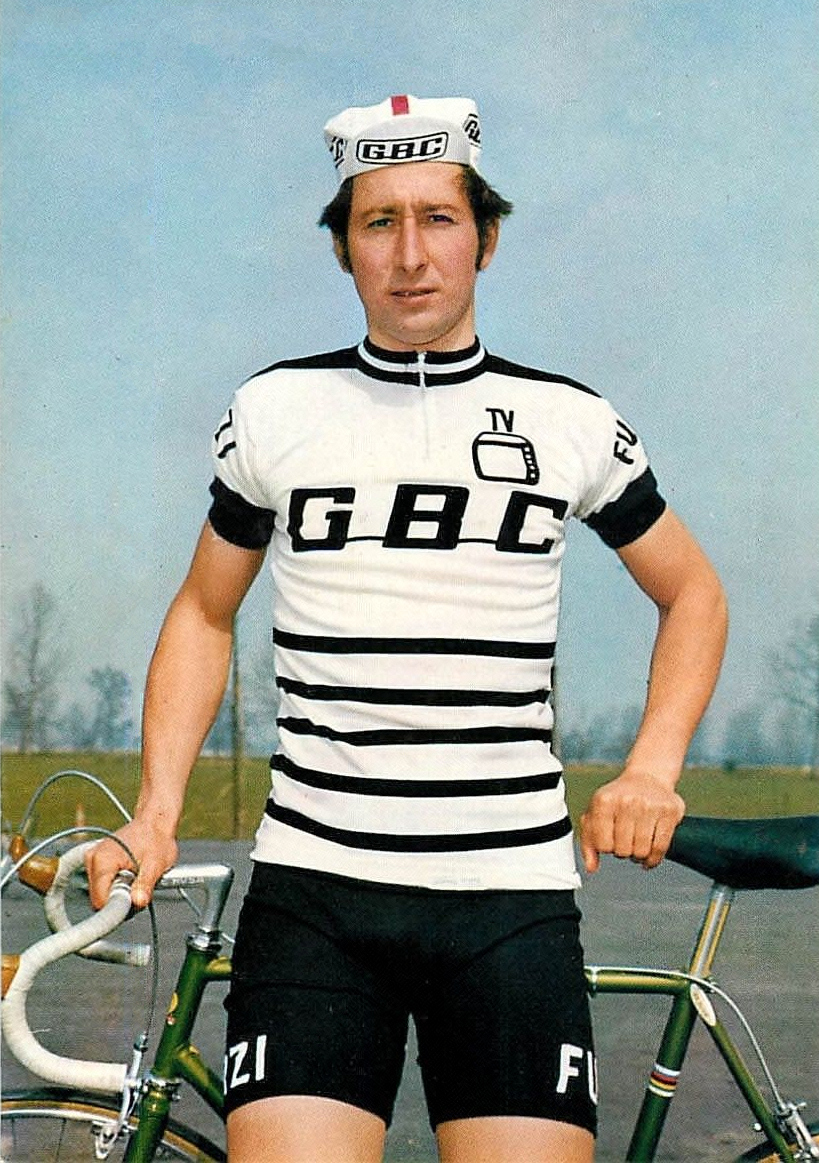
- Giorgio Morbiato wearing the team's jersey

Team information
- UCI code: GBC
- Registered: Italy (1963–1969); Switzerland (1970); Italy (1971–1977)
- Founded: 1963
- Disbanded: 1977
- Discipline: Road

Key personnel
- Team managers: Franco Cribiori; Enzo Moser; Dino Zandegù

Team name history
- 1963 1964–1969 1970–1971 1972 1973 1974 1975 1976 1977: G.B.C.–Gramaglia; G.B.C. G.B.C.–Zimba; G.B.C.–Sony; G.B.C.–Sony–Furzi; Wega; Wega–G.B.C. G.B.C.–TV Color–Sony; G.B.C.–Itla–TV Color

G.B.C. was an Italian and Swiss professional cycling team that existed from 1963 to 1977. Many highly successful riders rode for the team, including Wladimiro Panizza, Roberto Ballini and Rudi Altig.

In 1970, another team, Zimba merged into GBC.

The team was selected to race in eight editions of the Giro d'Italia, where they achieved one stage win by Roberto Ballini in 1969.

The 1977 team Direttore Sportivo were Dino Zandegu and Domenico Garbelli. Domenico was one of the founding partners of Rossin Bikes, who supplied their bicycles for the 1977 season.

== Major victories ==
- Coppa Placci: Roberto Ballini (1969)
- Rund um den Henninger Turm: Rudi Altig (1970)
- Tour de Berne: Eric Spahn (1972)
- Giro della Provincia di Reggio Calabria: Wladimiro Panizza (1973)
- Giro di Romagna: Wladimiro Panizza (1973), Roberto Ceruti (1977)
