= Enrico Paolini =

Italian cyclist (1945–2025)

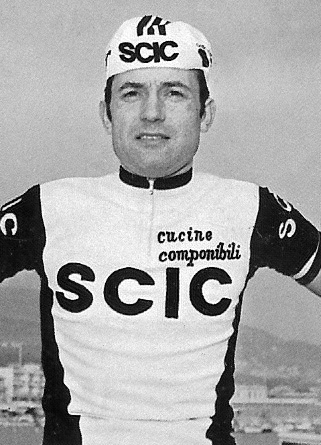
- Paolini in 1975

Personal information
- Born: 26 March 1945 Pesaro, Italy
- Died: 6 May 2025 (aged 80) San Costanzo, Italy

Cycling career
- Sport: Cycling
- Discipline: Road
- Role: Rider

Professional team
- 1969–1979: Scic

Major wins
- Gran Premio Città di Camaiore (1969); Giro d'Italia, 7 stages (1970–1978); Giro del Veneto (1972); Giro dell'Umbria (1972); Italian national road race champion (1973, 1974, 1977); Tre Valli Varesine (1973); GP Cemab (1974); Milano–Vignola (1974); Coppa Bernocchi (1975); Giro dell'Emilia (1975); Giro della Provincia di Reggio Calabria (1976); Milano–Torino (1976); Giro di Campania (1977)

Enrico Paolini (26 March 1945 – 6 May 2025) was an Italian racing cyclist, who competed in the 1970s. He died on 6 May 2025, at the age of 80.

== Grand Tour results timeline ==
	1969	1970	1971	1972	1973	1974	1975	1976	1977	1978	1979
Giro d'Italia	43	24	11	39	22	46	43	64	74	68	95
Stages won	0	1	1	1	0	2	1	0	0	1	0
Tour de France	DNE	DNF	DNF	DNE	DNE	DNE	DNE	50	DNE	DNE	DNE
Stages won	—	0	0	—	—	—	—	0	—	—	—
Vuelta a España	N/A	N/A	N/A	N/A	N/A	N/A	N/A	N/A	N/A	N/A	N/A
Stages won	N/A	N/A	N/A	N/A	N/A	N/A	N/A	N/A	N/A	N/A	N/A

Legend
1	Winner
2–3	Top three-finish
4–10	Top ten-finish
11–	Other finish
DNE	Did not enter
DNF-x	Did not finish (retired on stage x)
DNS-x	Did not start (not started on stage x)
HD-x	Finished outside time limit (occurred on stage x)
DSQ	Disqualified
N/A	Race/classification not held
NR	Not ranked in this classification
