= Giancarlo Polidori =

Italian cyclist (born 1943)

Personal information
- Full name: Giancarlo Polidori
- Born: 30 October 1943 (age 82) Sassoferrato, Italy

Cycling career
- Sport: Cycling
- Discipline: Road
- Role: Rider

Major wins
- One stage Giro d'Italia

Giancarlo Polidori (born 30 October 1943 in Sassoferrato, Italy) is a former Italian professional road bicycle racer. His career highlights include stage wins in Tirreno–Adriatico, the Giro d'Italia and the Tour de Romandie as well as wins in the one-day Italian semi-classics the Giro del Lazio, GP Montelupo, Tre Valli Varesine, the Giro di Toscane, the Trofeo Melinda and the Sassari-Cagliari. In addition he wore the yellow jersey as leader of the general classification for one day in the 1967 Tour de France.

== Palmarès ==
1965
Italy national amateur road race champion
1967
Tour de France:

Wearing yellow jersey for one day

1968
Giro del Lazio
1969
Ardea
Giro d'Italia:

Winner stage 1

1970
GP Montelupo
1971
Giro del Veneto
Giro di Toscana
GP Cemab
Tre Valli Varesine
1972
Sassari – Cagliari
1973
Giro dell'Umbria
1974
Faenza
Sassari – Cagliari
GP Industria
1976
Martorano
