= List of teams and cyclists in the 1968 Giro d'Italia =

The 1968 Giro d'Italia was the 51st edition of the Giro d'Italia, one of cycling's Grand Tours. The field consisted of 130 riders, and 90 riders finished the race.

== By rider ==
Legend
No.	Starting number worn by the rider during the Giro
Pos.	Position in the general classification
DNF	Denotes a rider who did not finish

No.	Name	Nationality	Team	Ref
1	Felice Gimondi	Italy	Salvarani	
2	Antonio Paolo Albonetti	Italy	Salvarani	
3	Rudi Altig	West Germany	Salvarani	
4	Lino Carletto	Italy	Salvarani	
5	Carlo Chiappano	Italy	Salvarani	
6	Luciano Dalla Bona	Italy	Salvarani	
7	Tomasso Da Pra	Italy	Salvarani	
8	Giancarlo Ferretti	Italy	Salvarani	
9	Roberto Poggiali	Italy	Salvarani	
10	Wilfried Peffgen	West Germany	Salvarani	
11	Julio Jiminez	Spain	Bic	
12	Gilles Locatelli	France	Bic	
13	Willy Van Neste	Belgium	Bic	
14	Cees Haast	Netherlands	Bic	
15	Edouard Sels	Belgium	Bic	
16	Charly Grosskost	France	Bic	
17	Jean-Claude Theillière	France	Bic	
18	Jean Ghisellini	France	Bic	
19	Roland Berland	France	Bic	
20	Serge Bolley	France	Bic	
21	Eddy Merckx	Belgium	Faema	
22	Vittorio Adorni	Italy	Faema	
23	Luciano Armani	Italy	Faema	
24	Luigi Casalini	Italy	Faema	
25	Lino Farisato	Italy	Faema	
26	Guido Reybrouck	Belgium	Faema	
27	Joseph Spruyt	Belgium	Faema	
28	Roger Swerts	Belgium	Faema	
29	Martin Van Den Bossche	Belgium	Faema	
30	Victor Van Schil	Belgium	Faema	
31	Francisco García	Spain	Fagor–Fargas	
32	Eusebio Vélez	Portugal	Fagor–Fargas	
33	José Antonio Momeñe	Spain	Fagor–Fargas	
34	José Luis Santamaría	Spain	Fagor–Fargas	
35	Ginés García Perán	Spain	Fagor–Fargas	
36	José Manuel López Rodríguez	Spain	Fagor–Fargas	
37	Mariano Díaz	Spain	Fagor–Fargas	
38	Joaquim Galera	Spain	Fagor–Fargas	
39	José María Errandonea	Spain	Fagor–Fargas	
40	Luis Ocaña	Spain	Fagor–Fargas	
41	Franco Bitossi	Italy	Filotex	
42	Italo Zilioli	Italy	Filotex	
43	Vittorio Chiarini	Italy	Filotex	
44	Ugo Colombo	Italy	Filotex	
45	Alberto Della Torre	Italy	Filotex	
46	Giorgio Favaro	Italy	Filotex	
47	Giuseppe Grassi	Italy	Filotex	
48	Adriano Passuello	Italy	Filotex	
49	Alfio Poli	Italy	Filotex	
50	Flaviano Vicentini	Italy	Filotex	
51	Damiano Capodivento	Italy	G.B.C.	
52	Giorgio Destro	Italy	G.B.C.	
53	Domenico Mazzanti	Italy	G.B.C.	
54	Giuseppe Poli	Italy	G.B.C.	
55	Peter Abt	Switzerland	G.B.C.	
56	René Binggeli	Switzerland	G.B.C.	
57	Auguste Girard	Switzerland	G.B.C.	
58	Rolf Maurer	Switzerland	G.B.C.	
59	Louis Pfenninger	Switzerland	G.B.C.	
60	Bernard Vifian	Switzerland	G.B.C.	
61	Vito Taccone	Italy	Germanvox–Wega	
62	Ole Ritter	Denmark	Germanvox–Wega	
63	Eraldo Bocci	Italy	Germanvox–Wega	
64	Lorenzo Carminati	Italy	Germanvox–Wega	
65	Renato Laghi	Italy	Germanvox–Wega	
66	Giovanni Mantovani	Italy	Germanvox–Wega	
67	Giuseppe Milioli	Italy	Germanvox–Wega	
68	Henning Petersen	Denmark	Germanvox–Wega	
69	Primo Franchini	Italy	Germanvox–Wega	
70	Bruno Vittiglio	Italy	Germanvox–Wega	
71	Ottorino Benedetti	Italy	Kelvinator	
72	Attilio Benfatto	Italy	Kelvinator	
73	Carlo Brunetti	Italy	Kelvinator	
74	Vin Denson	Great Britain	Kelvinator	
75	Mario Di Torro	Italy	Kelvinator	
76	Karl-Heinz Kunde	West Germany	Kelvinator	
77	Luciano Lievore	Italy	Kelvinator	
78	Mario Mancini	Italy	Kelvinator	
79	Albano Negro	Italy	Kelvinator	
80	Mario Zanin	Italy	Kelvinator	
81	Roberto Ballini	Italy	Max Meyer	
82	Giampaolo Cucchieti	Italy	Max Meyer	
83	Adriano Durante	Italy	Max Meyer	
84	Bruno Fantinato	Italy	Max Meyer	
85	Luciano Galbo	Italy	Max Meyer	
86	Claudio Michelotto	Italy	Max Meyer	
87	Guido Neri	Italy	Max Meyer	
88	Luigi Sgarbozza	Italy	Max Meyer	
89	Reino Stefanoni	Italy	Max Meyer	
90	Giorgio Zancanaro	Italy	Max Meyer	
91	Mario Anni	Italy	Molteni	
92	Franco Balmamion	Italy	Molteni	
93	Marino Basso	Italy	Molteni	
94	Francis Blanc	Switzerland	Molteni	
95	Franco Bodrero	Italy	Molteni	
96	Pietro Campagnari	Italy	Molteni	
97	Giuseppe Fezzardi	Italy	Molteni	
98	Gianni Motta	Italy	Molteni	
99	Edy Schütz	Luxembourg	Molteni	
100	Guerrino Tosello	Italy	Molteni	
101	Renzo Baldan	Italy	Pepsi-Cola	
102	Graziano Battistini	Italy	Pepsi-Cola	
103	Renato Bongioni	Italy	Pepsi-Cola	
104	Michele Dancelli	Italy	Pepsi-Cola	
105	Giovanni De Franceschi	Italy	Pepsi-Cola	
106	Imerio Massignan	Italy	Pepsi-Cola	
107	Aldo Pifferi	Italy	Pepsi-Cola	
108	Giancarlo Polidori	Italy	Pepsi-Cola	
109	Silvano Schiavon	Italy	Pepsi-Cola	
110	Karl Brand	Switzerland	Pepsi-Cola	
111	André Bayssière	France	Peugeot	
112	Raymond Delisle	France	Peugeot	
113	Jean-Claude Daunat	France	Peugeot	
114	Jean Dumont	France	Peugeot	
115	René Grenier	France	Peugeot	
116	Désiré Letort	France	Peugeot	
117	Roger Pingeon	France	Peugeot	
118	Henri Rabaute	France	Peugeot	
119	Daniel Samy	France	Peugeot	
120	André Zimmermann	France	Peugeot	
121	Willy Planckaert	Belgium	Smith's	
122	Georges Vandenberghe	Belgium	Smith's	
123	Frans Brands	Belgium	Smith's	
124	Jaak De Boever	Belgium	Smith's	
125	Jean-Baptiste Claes	Belgium	Smith's	
126	Albert Van Vlierberghe	Belgium	Smith's	
127	René Corthout	Belgium	Smith's	
128	Roger Kindt	Belgium	Smith's	
129	Roland Van De Rijse	Belgium	Smith's	
130	Bart Zoet	Netherlands	Smith's	

== By nationality ==
The 130 riders that competed in the 1968 Giro d'Italia represented 11 different countries.

Country	No. of riders	Finishers	Stage wins
Belgium	17	7	8 (Eddy Merckx x4, Guido Reybrouck x3, Ward Sels)
Denmark	2	1	
France	16	9	1 (Charly Grosskost x2)
West Germany	3	2	
United Kingdom	1	1	
Italy	69	57	10 (Italo Zilioli, Guerrino Tosello, Emilio Casalini, Lino Farisato, Luigi Sgarbozza, Marino Basso, Felice Gimondi, Franco Bitossi x2, Luciano Dalla Bona)
Luxembourg	1	1	
Netherlands	2	1	
Portugal	1	0	
Spain	10	6	4 (José Antonio Momeñe, Julio Jiménez x2, Luis Pedro Santamarina)
Switzerland	8	5	
Total	130	90	
