= Vin Denson =

English cyclist (1935–2026)

Vincent Denson
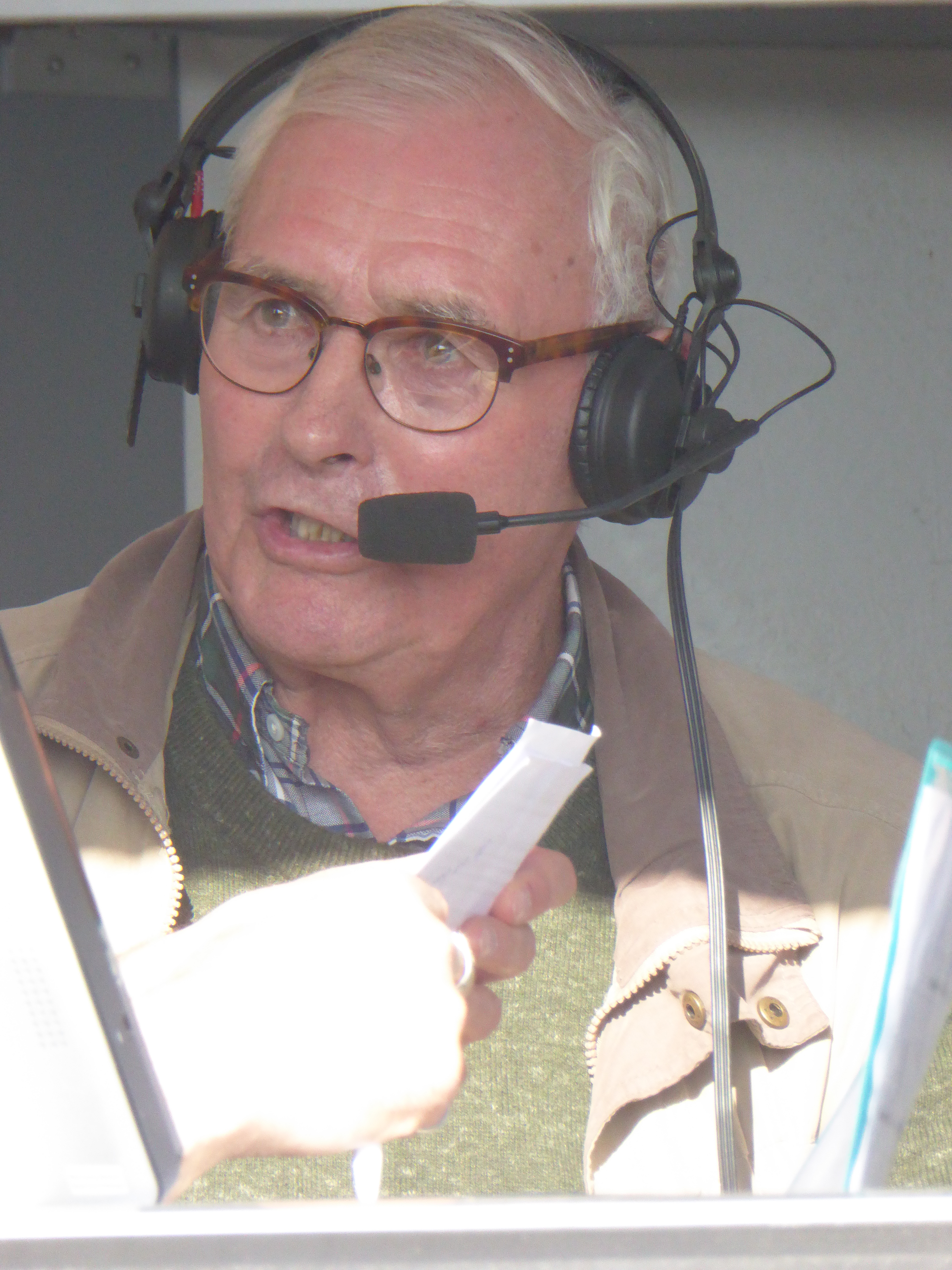
- Denson at the 2018 Tour de Yorkshire

Personal information
- Nicknames: Vin, Vic
- Born: 24 November 1935 Chester, England
- Died: 14 October 2026 (aged 90)

Cycling career
- Sport: Cycling
- Discipline: Road
- Role: Rider

Amateur teams
- 1952: Chester Road Club
- 1960: Clifton Cycling Club

Professional teams
- 1961–1962: Margnat–Rochet–Dunlop
- 1963: Pelforth–Sauvage–Lejeune
- 1964: Solo–Superia
- 1965–1966: Ford France–Gitane
- 1967–May 1968: Bic–Hutchinson
- May 1968–Dec 1968: Kelvinator
- 1969: Bantel

Major wins
- 1962 – GP Frimatic; 1962 – eight-day Vuelta Bidasoa, in Spain; 1962 – 1 stage of the Circuit d'Aquitaine; 1962 – sixth in the Grand Prix des Nations; 1965 – Tour of Luxembourg; 1965 - 1st Stage 1b Tour de France (TTT); 1966 – Stage 7 of the Giro d'Italia

Vincent Denson (24 November 1935 – 14 October 2026) was an English professional racing cyclist who rode the Tour de France, won a stage of the Giro d'Italia and won the Tour of Luxembourg in the 1960s.

Denson was a team-mate of Rik Van Looy and of Jacques Anquetil and, in the Tour de France, of Tom Simpson. He was the first British rider to win a stage of the Giro, before finishing 40th overall.

== Origins ==
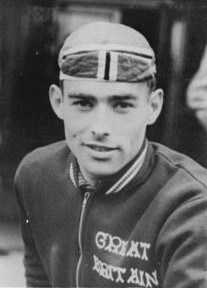
Denson in 1960

Denson was born in Chester, England on 24 November 1935. He had his first bike at 12, a black Hercules Falcon borrowed from his brother and with wooden blocks fitted to the pedals to make it smaller. He began riding to Helsby Hill, Rhyl and Prestatyn and went youth-hostelling. At 17 he joined Chester Road Club, initially for touring but then to race. He was inspired by his French teacher at school, who had lived in France, whose hero was Jean Robic and who gave his class Miroir du Cyclisme to study. Denson's first race was an evening 25-mile time-trial, which he finished in 1h 4 m 30s. He said:

My best memories of those days are of the club runs in Cheshire and Wales – loading someone's saddlebag with horseshoes at the Bangor-on-Dee blacksmith's, fording rivers then lighting fires round which we singed our socks and shrivelled our shoes; riding out to races on Saturday afternoons through busy Liverpool and getting digs on say the L1 or L6, then going to the Green Man [pub] for a singsong pint. Those early racing days were often pretty boozy but we were all as keen as mustard and trained and raced hard so that alcohol consumed the night before was quickly eliminated the next day.

He finished four times in the top 12 of the British Best All-Rounder competition, which aggregates rides over 50 and 100 miles and 12 hours. He came seventh in the Milk Race in 1959 and fifth in 1960. He finished the Peace Race of 1960 and 1961 in 17th and 27th. The Peace Race, which linked Berlin, Warsaw and Prague was run over roads often still wrecked from the Second World War. It was always keenly contested by riders from the communist bloc. Denson said:

The lessons I learned from those Peace Races [included] learning how to avoid hitting heaps of fallen riders... I was leading one charge down one side of the tram lines and looking across I saw Ken Hill leading the other. Suddenly we merged into one group as we flashed down a narrow street and into the tunnel entrance to the track. I kept well to the left, so as to ride as straight as possible, but Covens, the Belgian, decided to chop the corner and pip me for the lead. His speed on the loose shale spun the back of the bike round and took my front wheel. I remember folding my bike up and taking a few inches off the top of a concrete post. I finished, running round the track, carrying my bike and a sore head, nearly two minutes down on the winner – Covens!

Then, when my wounds were healing nicely, on the eighth stage, in Poland, dozens of riders fell in front of me at a tramway junction where the lines seemed to go in all directions. I rode up on to a heap of men and bikes, it seemed like four feet high, and then down the other side intact. My wheel disintegrated into a dozen pieces, my forks dug into the cobbles and I was ejected like a jet pilot at 30mph.

== Semi-professional career ==
Denson failed to make the British team for the Olympic Games and took out a licence as an independent, or semi-professional, for Temple Cycles in 1961. He and three other riders, Ken Laidlaw, Stan Brittain and Sean Ryan, moved to Donzenac, near Brive.

He rode for Britain in the 1961 Tour de France, which was for national teams. Only three of the team – Laidlaw, Brian Robinson and Seamus Elliott got to the finish. Denson dropped out on the col de la République, also known as the col du Grand Bois, outside St-Étienne.

Denson returned to York, where he and his wife, Vi, were buying a house. In March 1962 they decided to return to France, travelling to Paris and then to Troyes, where Denson joined the UVC Aube club, sponsored by Frimatic. He was paid £24 a month.

He won the GP Frimatic by four minutes and then the eight-day Vuelta Bidasoa, in Spain. He won a stage of a professional race, the Circuit d'Aquitaine in France and came sixth in the Grand Prix des Nations despite being led off course and twice losing his chain.

Of his Circuit of Aquitaine ride, he said:

On the second stage I was away with Baldassaroni, the independent champion of France, and one other, and I could see that [professional] contract waiting for me. Baldassaroni told me it was all right, he wouldn't be contesting the sprint, and maybe he genuinely meant it, but I said to myself 'I've heard that one before', and on the final hill I jumped away – and stripped my sprocket. Next day had to be it. I was determined no one was going to stop me, and with 40 km to go I broke away with a group of eight. The danger men were busy watching each other and as the finish came near I saw my chance. Although not a strong sprinter, I threw all I had into a sprint from the back, and on the line I got the verdict from Thiélin and Le Dissez – it was a photo-finish, in fact.

== Professional career ==
Denson's club recommended him to Maurice de Muer, manager of the Pelforth-Sauvage Lejeune professional team. De Muer promised him a contract if he won a stage of the Circuit d'Aquitaine and rode well in the Grand Prix des Nations. Denson signed with Pelforth in October 1963, when he was 27, riding in the yellow, white and blue of the French brewery and its cosponsor, a bicycle factory. He was the second Englishman in the team, with Alan Ramsbottom.

It can be really disastrous for a pro in a big team to miss the Tour, for it means no after-Tour criteriums, where a lot of money is made. Instead, he is a forgotten man, his only hope the end-of-season classics and semi-classics, like the Nations, Paris–Tours, Giro di Lombardia, the Grand Prix de Fourmies and others, but what a fight it is to do a ride in these hotly-disputed rat-races!

—

He came 10th in Milan–San Remo and in Paris–Nice but didn't make Pelforth's Tour team. Denson was already unhappy with Pelforth, where the policy was to pay riders' salaries at the end and not during the season. He was already reduced to eating carrots found in fields while training. Not riding the Tour was a further financial blow.

Denson left Troyes in 1964, hoping for a place with Tom Simpson in the Peugeot team. When the place didn't become free, he moved to Ghent, in Belgium. There, if he couldn't ride for Simpson he could at least train with him. In races, however, they would be rivals; Denson was to ride for Rik Van Looy in the Solo team, sponsored by a margarine company. He was the only foreigner in the team and never did master the Dutch that the rest of team spoke.

When we were all together the others had to translate for me, but on the road it was not such a handicap as it might have been, for the group was aptly named – everyone rode solo! There was no teamwork as such, no plans made at the start of a race, the only standing order being that we all rode for Van Looy, who was the real power behind the team as well as in it.

The team won six stages of that year's Tour de France.

Denson said: "I was leading out sprints for Edward Sels. I pulled my guys out for Sels and almost got a stage win at Toulon behind Jan Janssen and Willy Bocklandt.

That autumn, at the world championship at Sallanches, France, Jacques Anquetil and his directeur-sportif, Raphaël Géminiani, said they had been watching Denson and wanted him for a team they were creating, sponsored by Ford-France. Denson stayed with Anquetil when the sponsor changed to Bic, opened a bar in Ghent, and had what he called the happiest years of his racing life.

== Simpson's death ==
Denson rode for Britain in the 1967 Tour de France. During it, his friend Tom Simpson died close to the summit of Mont Ventoux. He said of the hours at the hotel waiting for news of his leader:

I had taken my bike for some work to be done, to Harry Hall. Harry turned to me and he said 'He's dead. You know, I am certain he's dead.' I said 'No, no, that's not possible, Harry.' Harry said 'He was taken to hospital, we can hope for the best, but I'm certain he's dead.' This knocked me, personally, and I started to think there was a possibility that he could have been dead. Then suddenly, as we went in for the meal Alec Taylor [the team manager] pulled me to one side. He said 'We've had positive news from the hospital. He's been announced dead on arrival at the hospital.'

Although I knew I was a grown man, I remember being almost hysterical in tears. I felt as if something inside me died when Tom died.

Next day the French rider, Jean Stablinski, said the remaining riders wanted Denson, as Simpson's closest friend, to ride ahead of the race and win for Simpson. The victory went instead to Barry Hoban, who said he found himself at the front but remembers nothing else. Denson was still upset.

Denson lost heart, began missing contracts. He recovered by the end of the year and talked to the Italian team, Molteni, about joining. Instead he signed for Kelvinator to ride the Giro d'Italia. A year later (1968) he returned to Britain and rode for the domestic professional team, Bantel.

== Giro d'Italia ==
Denson said of a day spent chasing Gianni Motta through Naples:
"They were chucking rubbish at us from balconies: tomatoes, spaghetti, old newspapers, anything. I was covered with the contents of the dustbins when I walked into the hotel at Naples. The bastards!"

—

Denson won a stage of the Giro d'Italia, stage 9 in 1966 before finishing 40th overall. He said:

There were certain days when we were told there was going to be a lull and we could go for a stage. I was going strong and I dropped them [the Italian and Belgian with whom he was riding] on the last hill. I cracked on. I'd slipped a gear but I flicked it the other way and crucified myself to get up the last climb. I was pleased with my ride – it gave me a little bit to put in the pot because we all used to share our winnings.

Denson said Italian fans often made a pretence of helping push foreign riders up hills while pulling at their brakes to slow them down.

"We'd hack at these characters with our pumps to try and get them off and at the finish we'd get fined for being pushed."

He said his time-trialling experience helped him chase riders like Motta.

Time-trialling helps when you are in a break or getting across from bunch to break. It helped to make me strong and powerful and able to attack. I also did a lot of pursuiting, too, for the speed.

== Personal life and death ==
He returned to the UK and rode for the Bantel Team for 2 seasons. He joined a local cycling club the Harlow CC and he and Vi became very active members.

He later joined the Redbridge CC and raced as a club rider for several years. In 1976, Vin rode the Mersey Roads club 24 Hours TT. He covered 449.31 miles and together with Eric Angell and Ed Pheby won the team award for Redbridge CC amassing a total of 1327.72 miles. In 1977 Vin arranged for his wood treatment business to be the sponsor of the annual Circuit of the Rodings cycle race.

In the late 1990's he returned to track racing at the World Masters Track Championships where he finished 3rd in his age category in the Individual Pursuit.

He encouraged young riders and was indemand as a respected speaker for cyclists.

In 2008 he published his autobiography "Full Cycle" to much interest and acclaim

In 1969 Denson opened a wood-treatment business near Harlow, Essex, before dropping out of professional racing. He continued to race as an amateur.

Denson was known in continental Europe as Vic, a name he acquired because Vin – short for Vincent – is French for "wine".

Denson died on 14 October 2026, aged 90.
