= Death of Tom Simpson =

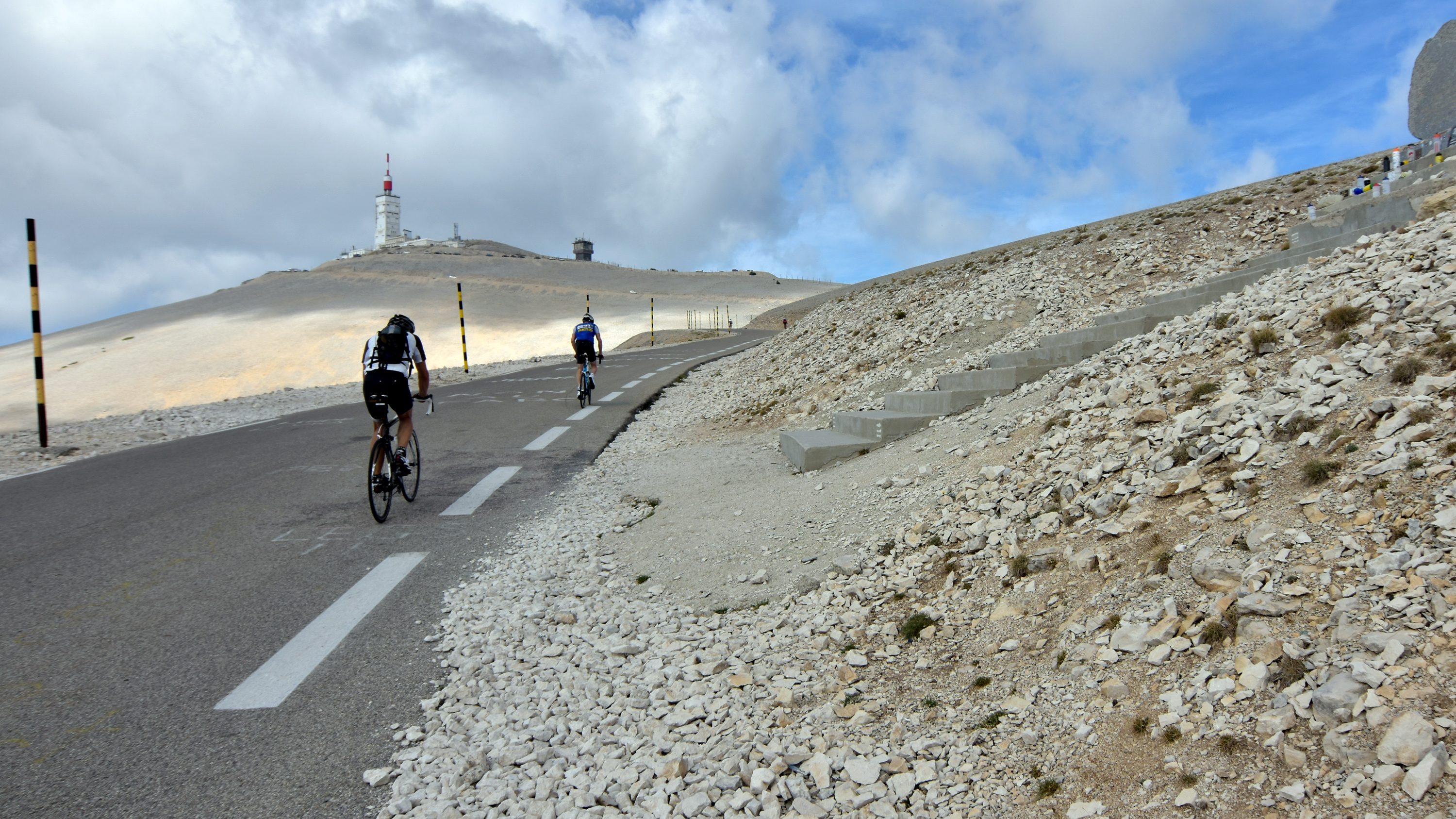
- The location of Simpson's final collapse one kilometre from the summit of Mont Ventoux.
- Date: 13 July 1967
- Time: 5:40 p.m
- Location: Mont Ventoux, Provence, France; 44.169642°N 5.286016°E
- Cause: Heart failure caused by drug and alcohol combination
- Burial: Harworth, Nottinghamshire, England

Tom Simpson (30 November 1937 – 13 July 1967) was a British professional cyclist, one of Britain's most successful of all time. At the time of the 1967 Tour de France, he was the undisputed leader of the British team. In the 13th stage of that race, he collapsed and died during the ascent of Mont Ventoux.

Simpson fell ill with diarrhoea during the Tour's tenth stage. He was under pressure from his personal manager to continue in the race, though members of his team encouraged him to quit. Near the summit of Mont Ventoux, Simpson fell off his bike but was able to get back on it. After riding a short distance farther, he collapsed. He was pronounced dead after being airlifted to a hospital. The post-mortem examination found that Simpson had taken amphetamine and alcohol, a diuretic combination which proved fatal when combined with the heat, the hard climb of the Ventoux, and the stomach complaint.

Approximately 5,000 people came to Simpson's funeral service. A memorial stands close to the spot where he died and has become a pilgrimage for many cyclists. At the Harworth and Bircotes Sports and Social Club, there is a museum dedicated to Simpson's memory.

== Background ==
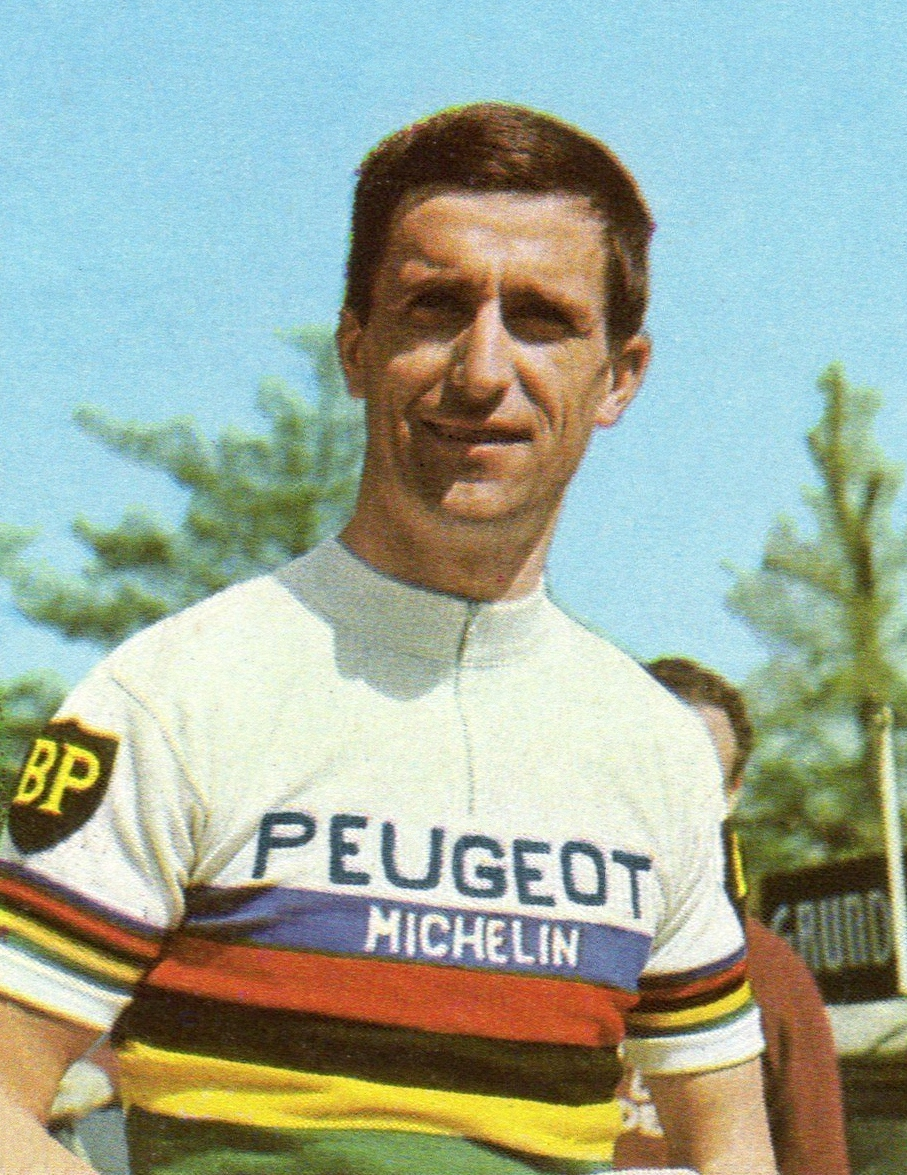
Tom Simpson c. 1966

Going into the 1967 Tour de France, Simpson was determined to make an impact. He was in his eighth year as a professional cyclist and wanted to earn as much money as possible before retiring. Simpson was optimistic that he could finish high in the general classification, securing larger appearance fees from post-Tour criteriums. His plan was to either finish in the top three or wear the leader's yellow jersey; he had targeted three key stages, one of which included the thirteenth over Mont Ventoux, riding safe until the race reached the mountains.

The 1967 Tour was contested by national teams rather than trade teams. (Note: The national team format was used in 1967 Tour de France after tour organiser Félix Lévitan believed the team sponsors were behind the riders strike in the previous year's Tour.) Simpson was the undisputed leader of the British team, one of the weakest in the race. Four team members had experience in top-level racing and six were riding the Tour for the first time. This could have been seen as a handicap, but Simpson was not guaranteed the leadership of his trade team, Peugeot-BP-Michelin, and would have to compete with Frenchman Roger Pingeon – the eventual winner of the 1967 Tour.

After the first week, Simpson lay in sixth place overall, leading the favourites. As the race crossed the Alps, Simpson fell ill, across the Col du Galibier, with diarrhoea and stomach pains. He was not able to eat and rode on reserves, finishing in 16th place and dropping to seventh overall, with his rivals ahead. He placed in 39th position on stage 11 and 7th on 12.

In Marseille, on the evening of 12 July 1967 on stage 12, his personal manager, Daniel Dousset, put Simpson under pressure to produce good results. However, his friend and teammate on the British team, Vin Denson, advised Simpson to limit his losses and settle with what he had; his Peugeot manager, Gaston Plaud, asked Simpson to quit the race even though he had no authority to do so.

== Death ==
The thirteenth stage (13 July) of the 1967 Tour measured 211.5 km (131.4 mi); it started in Marseille, crossing Mont Ventoux (the "Giant of Provence") before finishing in Carpentras. At dawn, Tour doctor Pierre Dumas met journalist Pierre Chany near his hotel. Dumas noted the warm temperature: "If the boys stick their nose in a 'topette' [bag of drugs] today, we could have a death on our hands". At the start line, a journalist noticed Simpson looked tired and asked him if the heat was the problem. Simpson replied, "No, it's not the heat, it's the Tour."

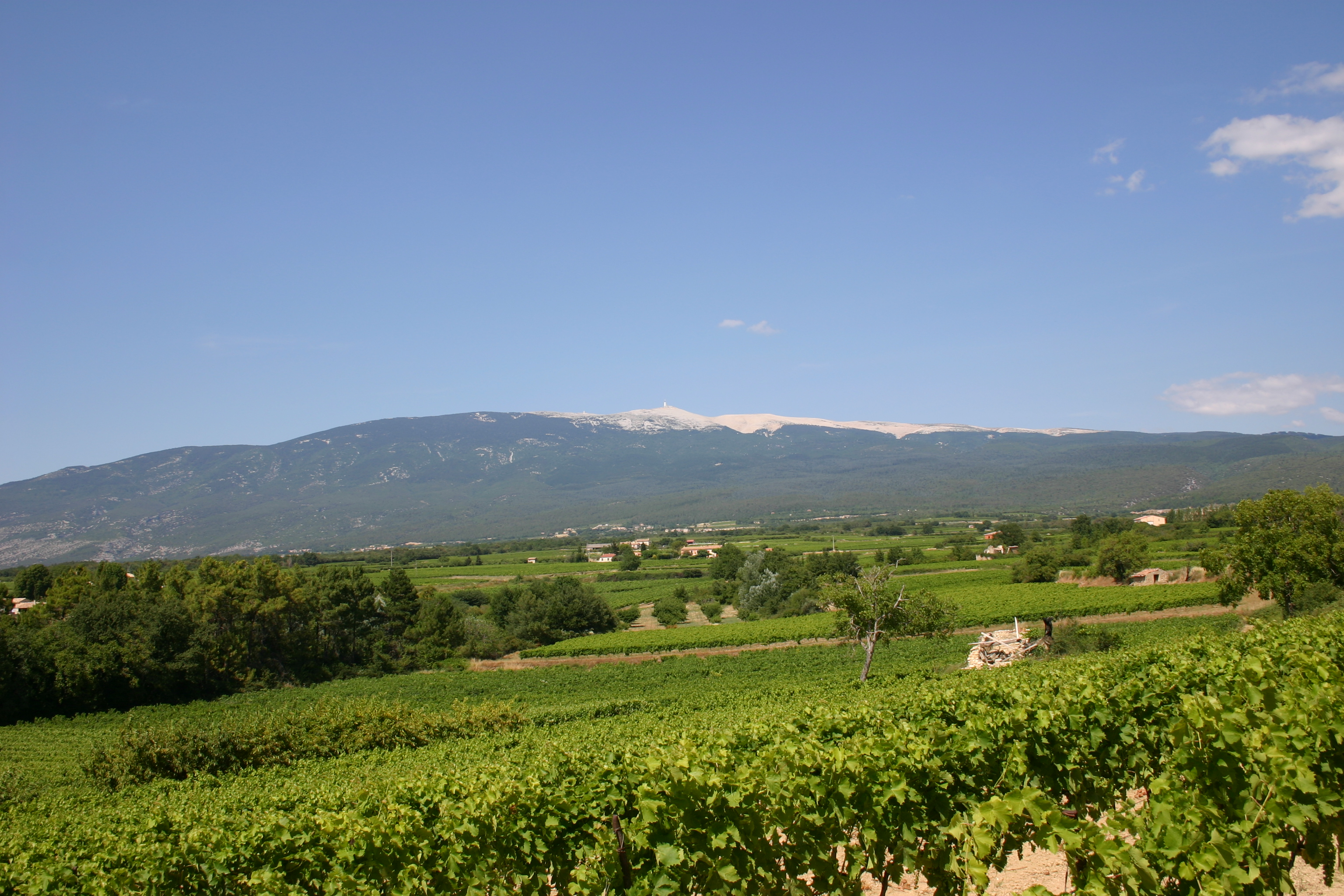
The 1,912 m (6,273 ft)-high Mont Ventoux, where Simpson died on 13 July 1967, aged 29.

As the race reached the lower slopes of Ventoux, Simpson's team mechanic, Harry Hall, witnessed a still ill Simpson putting the lid back on his water bottle as he exited a building. Race commissaire (official) Jacques Lohmuller later confirmed to Hall that he also saw the incident and that Simpson was putting brandy in his bottle. (Note: Alcohol was used as a stimulant and to dull pain. At the time, the Tour organisers limited each rider to four bidons (bottles) of water, about two litres, two on the bike and two more given at feeding stations – the effects of dehydration being poorly understood. During races, riders raided roadside bars for drinks, and filled their bottles from fountains.) As the race closed in on the summit of Ventoux, the peloton began to fracture, and for a while, Simpson managed to stay in the front group of elite riders. He then slipped back to a group of chasers around one minute behind before he began to lose control of his bike and zig-zag across the road. (Note: Zig-zagging on an ascent is way of lessening the gradient.) His team manager, Alec Taylor, feared for Simpson less for the way he was going up the mountain than for the way he would go down the other side. (Note: The rushing air would revive him but Taylor feared that Simpson, whom he described as a madcap descender, would overdo things and crash.)

One kilometre from the summit, Simpson fell off his bike. Taylor and Hall arrived in the team car to help him. Hall tried to persuade Simpson to stop when he fell, saying, "Come on Tom, that's it, that's your Tour finished." But Simpson said he wanted to go on. Taylor was informed and said, "If Tom wants to go on, he goes." Noticing that his toe straps were still undone, Simpson said, "Me straps, Harry, me straps!" They got him on his bike and pushed him off. Simpson's last words, as remembered by Hall, were, "On, on, on." The words, "Put me back on my bike!" were invented by Sid Saltmarsh, covering the event for The Sun and Cycling – now Cycling Weekly – who was not there at the time but rather in a reception black-spot for live accounts on Radio Tour. Simpson managed to ride a further 500 yards (460 m) before he began to wobble. He was held upright by three spectators who then helped him to the ground on the side of the road. Simpson was unconscious with his hands locked to the handlebars. Hall shouted for the other mechanic, Ken Ryall, to prise them loose and the pair laid the lifeless Simpson beside the road. Hall and a nurse from the Tour's medical team took turns giving him mouth-to-mouth resuscitation before Dumas came with an oxygen mask.

Approximately forty minutes after his collapse, a police helicopter took Simpson to nearby Avignon Hospital, where he was pronounced dead at 5:40 p.m. Dumas refused to sign a burial certificate and a poisons expert from Marseille was commissioned to conduct an autopsy. Two empty tubes of amphetamines and a half-full tube were found in the rear pocket of his racing jersey, one of which was labelled Tonedron. The British team was called in for questioning and their baggage was searched. Two of the Belgian soigneurs – who looked after riders on the British team including Simpson – locked themselves in their room, got drunk and did not come out.

On the next racing day, the other riders were reluctant to continue racing and asked the organisers for a postponement. French rider Jean Stablinski suggested that the race continue, with a British rider, whose team would wear black armbands, allowed to win the stage. Barry Hoban won the stage. This was later a subject of argument as it was widely believed that the race winner should have been Denson, Simpson's other teammate and close friend.

== Post-mortem ==
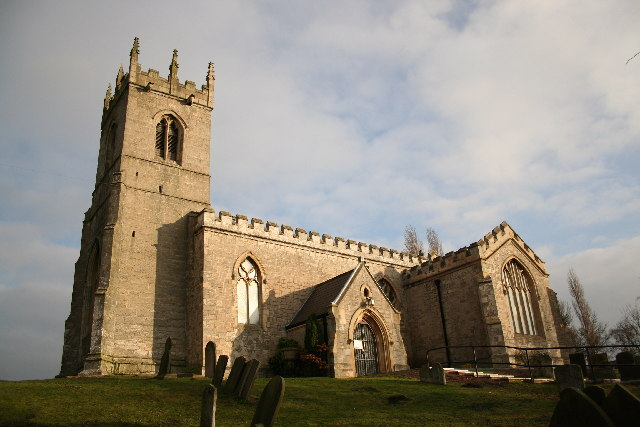
Simpson's burial service took place at the 12th-century All Saints Parish Church, Harworth.

Initial media reports suggested that Simpson's death was caused by heat exhaustion, until, on 31 July 1967, British journalist J. L. Manning of the Daily Mail broke the news about a formal connection between drugs and Simpson's death: "Tommy Simpson rode to his death in the Tour de France so doped that he did not know he had reached the limit of his endurance. He died in the saddle, slowly asphyxiated by intense effort in a heatwave after taking methylamphetamine drugs and alcoholic stimulants."

French authorities confirmed that Simpson had traces of amphetamine in his body, impairing his judgement and allowing him to push his body beyond its limit. The official cause of death was "heart failure caused by exhaustion." The live broadcast was the first showing a death caused by doping. His death contributed to the introduction of mandatory testing for performance-enhancing drugs in cycling, leading to tests in 1968 at the Giro d'Italia, Tour de France and Summer Olympics.

Simpson was buried in Harworth Cemetery in Nottinghamshire, after a service at the All Saints Parish Church in the village. An estimated 5,000 mourners attended the ceremony, including Peugeot teammate Eddy Merckx, the only continental rider in attendance. The epitaph on Simpson's gravestone reads, "His body ached, his legs grew tired, but still he would not give in," taken from a card left by his brother, Harry, following his death. In his adopted hometown of Ghent, a service was held at Sint-Amandsberg's Catholic Cathedral.

== Memorials ==
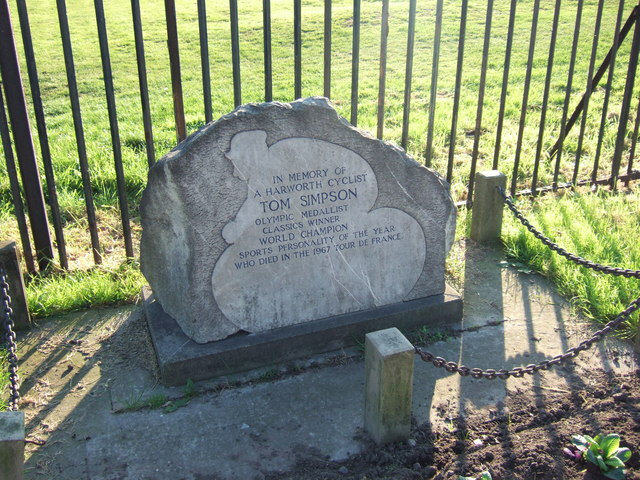
The memorial in Harworth, a replica of the one which stands on the spot where Simpson died.

A granite memorial to Simpson stands on the spot where he collapsed and died on Ventoux, one kilometre east of the summit, with the words "Olympic medallist, world champion, British sporting ambassador." Cycling opened a subscription fund in the week following his death, raising around £1,500. It was unveiled in 1968 by Simpson's wife Helen, Hoban, and the British team manager Alec Taylor. It was inspired by the memorial to motorcycle racer Jimmie Guthrie at The Cutting (now called "Guthrie's Memorial"), Isle of Man.

Over the years, Simpson's memorial slowly fell into disrepair and a new plinth was constructed, secured into the mountainside with steel rods. On the 30th anniversary of Simpson's death, his daughters Joanne and Jane added a plaque that reads, "There is no mountain too high." Concrete steps from the roadside to the memorial were opened on the 40th anniversary. The memorial has become a pilgrimage to cyclists, who pass the memorial and frequently leave tributes such as drinking bottles and caps. In nearby Bédoin, there is a plaque in the square, placed by journalists following the 1967 Tour.

The Harworth and Bircotes Sports and Social Club has a small museum dedicated to Simpson, opened by Belgian cyclist Lucien Van Impe in August 2001. The main display includes the bicycle he used to win the 1967 Paris–Nice and the jersey, gloves and shorts he wore on the day of his death. In 1997, a replica of the memorial on Ventoux was erected outside the museum. In Ghent there is a bust of Simpson at the entrance to the Kuipke velodrome. Every year since his death, the Tom Simpson Memorial Race has taken place in Harworth.

British rider David Millar won stage 12 of the 2012 Tour de France on the 45th anniversary of Simpson's death and, having previously been banned from cycling for using performance-enhancing drugs himself, paid tribute to Simpson and reinforced the importance of learning from his – and Simpson's – mistakes. Millar wrote the introduction for a reissue of Simpson's autobiography, Cycling is My Life, published in 2009.

== See also ==
- List of cyclists with a cycling related death
- List of doping cases in cycling

== Notes and references ==
=== Bibliography ===
- Dakin, Chiz (2014). Cycling in the Cotswolds. Milnthorpe, UK: Cicerone Press. ISBN 978-1-78362-042-5.
- Dauncey, Hugh; Hare, Geoff (2003). The Tour De France, 1903–2003: A Century of Sporting Structures, Meanings and Values. London: Frank Cass & Co. ISBN 978-0-203-50241-9.
- Dimeo, Paul (2007). A History of Drug Use in Sport: 1876–1976: Beyond Good and Evil. London: Routledge. ISBN 978-0-203-00370-1.
- Fotheringham, William (2007) [1st. pub. 2002]. Put Me Back on My Bike: In Search of Tom Simpson. London: Yellow Jersey Press. ISBN 978-0-224-08018-7.
- Henderson, Jon (2011). Best of British: Hendo's Sporting Heroes. London: Yellow Jersey Press. ISBN 978-1-4481-1341-5.
- Houlihan, Barrie (2002). Dying to Win: Doping in Sport And the Development of Anti-doping Policy, Part 996 (2nd ed.). Strasbourg, France: Council of Europe. ISBN 978-92-871-4685-4.
- Laurence, Alastair (Director) (2005). Death on the Mountain: The Story of Tom Simpson (Television production). London: BBC.
- Mazanov, Jason (2013). Towards a Social Science of Drugs in Sport. London: Routledge. ISBN 978-1-317-98454-2.
- McGann, Bill; McGann, Carol (2008). The Story of the Tour De France, Volume 2: 1965–2007. Indianapolis, IN: Dog Ear Publishing. ISBN 978-1-59858-608-4.
- Mehlman, Maxwell J. (2009). The Price of Perfection: Individualism and Society in the Era of Biomedical Enhancement. Baltimore, MD: JHU Press. ISBN 978-0-8018-9538-8.
- Nelsson, Richard (2012). The Tour De France ... to the Bitter End. London: Guardian Books. ISBN 978-0-85265-336-4.
- Rosen, Daniel M. (2008). Dope: A History of Performance Enhancement in Sports from the Nineteenth Century to Today. Santa Barbara, CA: ABC-CLIO. ISBN 978-0-313-34521-0.
- Sidwells, Chris (2000). Mr Tom: True Story of Tom Simpson. Norwich, UK: Mousehold Press. ISBN 978-1-874739-14-2.
- Thompson, Christopher S. (2008). The Tour de France: A Cultural History (2nd ed.). Berkeley, CA: University of California Press. ISBN 978-0-520-93486-3.
- Williams, Nicola; Le Nevez, Catherine (2007) [1st. pub. 1999]. Provence and the Côte d'Azur (5th ed.). Melbourne: Lonely Planet. ISBN 978-1-74104-236-8.
- Wong, Glenn M. (2010). Essentials of Sports Law. Santa Barbara, CA: ABC-CLIO. ISBN 978-0-313-35675-9.
- Woodland, Les (2007) [1st. pub. 2003]. The Yellow Jersey Companion to the Tour de France. London: Yellow Jersey Press. ISBN 978-0-224-08016-3.
