= Harry Hall (cyclist) =

British cycling mechanic

Personal information
- Born: 1928–29 Manchester, England
- Died: 28 October 2007 (aged 78) New Mills, England

Cycling career
- Sport: Cycling

Harry Hall (c. 1929 – 28 October 2007) was a British cycling mechanic and cycle shop owner.

Hall was born in Manchester, England in 1928 or 1929. An enthusiastic cyclist, in 1955 Hall gave up his job as a printer to establish Harry Hall Cycles. His first shop was at 400 Hyde Road, West Gorton which he opened in 1956 in a small terraced house near Belle Vue. Times were tough at the start and Hall worked as a delivery driver by day and built wheels at night, whist his wife Jean ran the shop. Hall moved to a larger shop in central Manchester at 30 Cathedral Street in 1960. Business was good, the shop was very popular and he expanded to include no. 32 next door. Hall was a member of Tame Valley RC and he supported and sponsored the popular and successful Manchester club.

Harry Hall was the British team mechanic in the 1961 Warsaw-Berlin-Prague race and went on to be the British Cycling Federation mechanic at most of the leading races including the Tour de l'Avenir and Tour de France. Harry's converted minivan was a very common sight at Britain's biggest cycling events from 1962 to 1976. Hall was described as "British cycling's most famous spannerman". In 1967, he was mechanic for Tom Simpson in the Tour de France. He was the last person to speak to Simpson before his death on Mont Ventoux.

Harry Hall had made good contacts in Europe when he travelled as a race mechanic, which enabled him to import the latest continental and Japanese equipment. Harry Hall frames were built by Roger Kowalski and he also outsourced frames from other builders such as Woodrup and Bob Jackson.

Hall sponsored some top amateur riders including Paul Sherwen, Graham Jones and Jeff Williams. Fotheringham describes the arrangement "The sponsorship deal was uniquely incentivised; cyclists were given a bike, for which they would have to pay at the end of the season. If, however, they managed to get photographs in a cycling magazine, during the season, of them and the bike, they would get credits to spend on kit at Hall's shop."

The shop moved in 1984 to a huge sub-basement at 25-33 Hanging Ditch, which occupied 7,000 square feet. The large shop was a great success and a mecca for Northern cyclists. The business expanded, employing fourteen staff and Harry's son Graham Hall took over in 1985 and Harry retired in 1989. Simon Pearson started working for Harry Hall in 1984, he became the shop manager and stayed there for decades.

Harry Hall's premises were opposite the Manchester Arndale Centre and the shop was extensively damaged by the IRA Manchester bombing on 15 June 1996. Harry Hall moved out to premises in Church Street, Eccles, but in the six months that they were in Eccles, they were broken into and bikes were stolen, then they were ram raided in a further theft. Harry Hall's moved back to central Manchester on 8 February 1997, taking a 4,000-square-foot shop on Lever Street, at the corner of Dale Street. The business moved again in 2000 to a new shop in the railway arches at 67 Whitworth Street West, Manchester.

Harry Hall lived in New Mills with his wife Jean and sons Graham and Robert. In later life, when his son Graham had taken over the running of the shop, Harry Hall started racing again for Tame Valley RC and won the British National and World Veterans' Championships in 1989 at the age of sixty. Harry Hall died in 2007 aged 78, in New Mills.

Harry Hall Cycles closed on 31 January 2024 after 67 years.
