= Pepsi-Cola (cycling team, 1969) =

Cycling team (1969)

Team information
- Registered: Spain
- Founded: 1969
- Disbanded: 1969
- Discipline: Road

Key personnel
- Team manager: Salvador Botella

Pepsi-Cola was a Spanish professional cycling team that existed for the 1969 season. The team was managed by former professional cyclist Salvador Botella.

The team competed in the 1969 Vuelta a España, where they had two stage wins.

== Major wins ==
1969
Vuelta a España

Stages 7 & 8, Ramón Sáez

Klasika Primavera, José Manuel Lasa
Prueba Villafranca de Ordizia, Miguel María Lasa
