= Kelvinator (cycling team) =

Italian cycling team

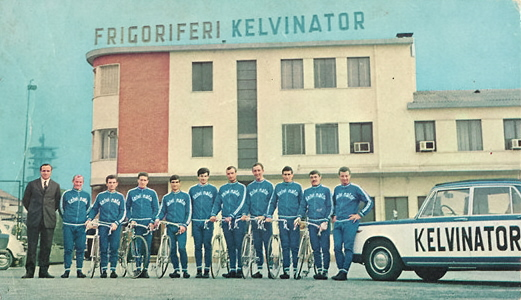

Team information
- Registered: Italy
- Founded: 1968
- Disbanded: 1968
- Discipline: Road

Key personnel
- Team managers: Ercole Baldini; Silvano Ciampi

Team name history
- 1968: Kelvinator

Kelvinator was an Italian professional cycling team that existed only in 1968. The team was sponsored by Kelvinator, an American home appliance company and competed in the 1968 Giro d'Italia.

== Major wins ==
1968
GP Vaux, Vincent Denson
Giro del Belvedere, Lucillo Lievore
