= Mont Ventoux =

Mountain in France

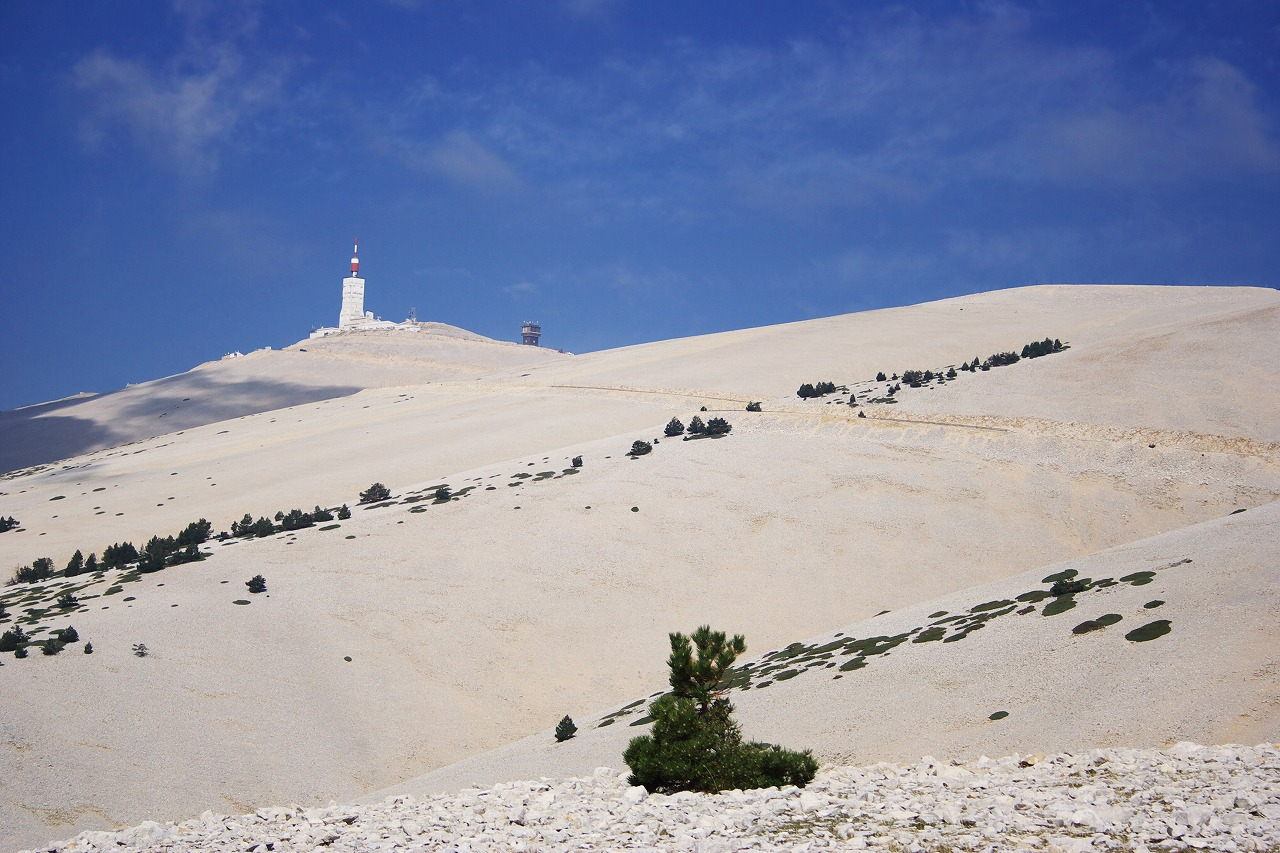
- South side of the summit of Mont Ventoux

Highest point
- Elevation: 1,910 m (6,270 ft)
- Prominence: 1,148 m (3,766 ft)
- Isolation: 61.04 km (37.93 mi) to Montagne Durbonas
- Coordinates: 44°10′28″N 5°16′44″E

Geography
- Location within France
- Location: Vaucluse, France
- Parent range: periphery of the Alps

Climbing
- First ascent: Prior to Jean Buridan; probably ancient
- Easiest route: Hike

Mont Ventoux
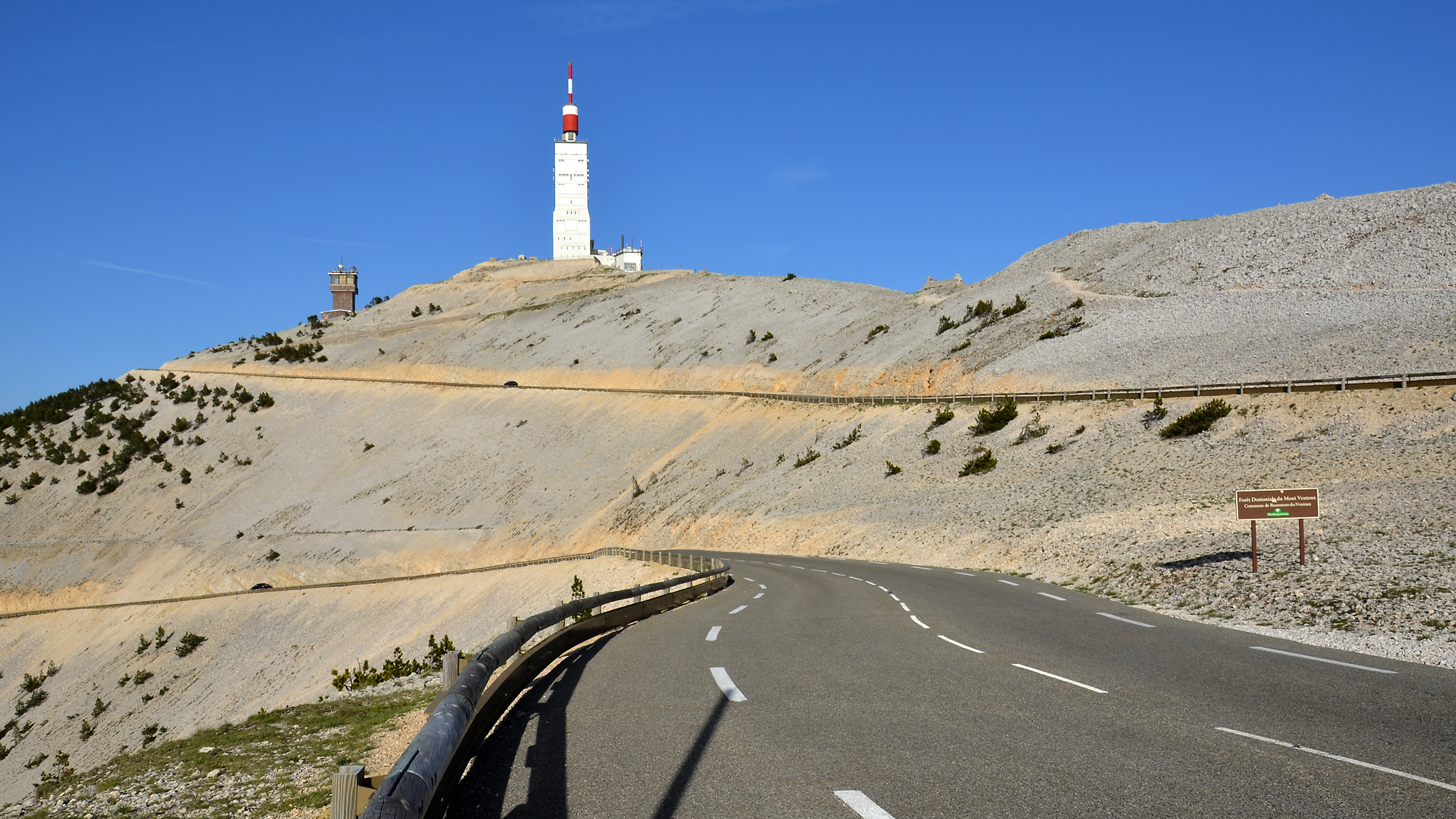
- North side of the summit of Mont Ventoux

- Location within Alps
- Elevation: 1,910 m (6,270 ft)
- Traversed by: road

Location
- Location: France
- Range: Free-standing on the western periphery of the Alps
- Coordinates: 44°10′28″N 5°16′44″E

Mont Ventoux (French: [mɔ̃ vɑ̃tu]; Provençal: Ventor [venˈtu]) is a mountain in the Provence region of southern France, located some 20 km (12 miles) northeast of Carpentras, Vaucluse. On the north side, the mountain borders the department of Drôme. At 1,910 m (6,270 ft), it is the highest mountain in the region and has been nicknamed the "Beast of Provence", the "Giant of Provence", or "The Bald Mountain". It has gained fame through its inclusion in the Tour de France cycling race; in 2009 it was the scene of the first penultimate-day mountain top finish in the Tour de France.

Mont Ventoux, although geologically part of the Alps, is often considered to be separate from them, due to the lack of mountains of a similar height nearby. It stands alone to the north of the Luberon range, separated by the Monts de Vaucluse, and just to the east of the Dentelles de Montmirail, its foothills. The top of the mountain is bare limestone without vegetation or trees, which makes the mountain's barren peak appear from a distance to be snow-capped all year round (its snow cover actually only lasts from December to April). Its isolated position overlooking the valley of the Rhône ensures that it dominates the entire region and can be seen from a long distance away on a clear day.

== Etymology ==
Venteux means windy in French. In the 10th century, the names Mons Ventosus and Mons Ventorius were used interchangeably. The mistral has created wind speeds at the summit as high as 320 km/h (200 mph). The wind blows over the mountains at 90 km/h (56 mph) for roughly 240 days a year. The road over the mountain is often closed due to high winds, especially the col des tempêtes ("storm pass") just before the summit.

== History ==
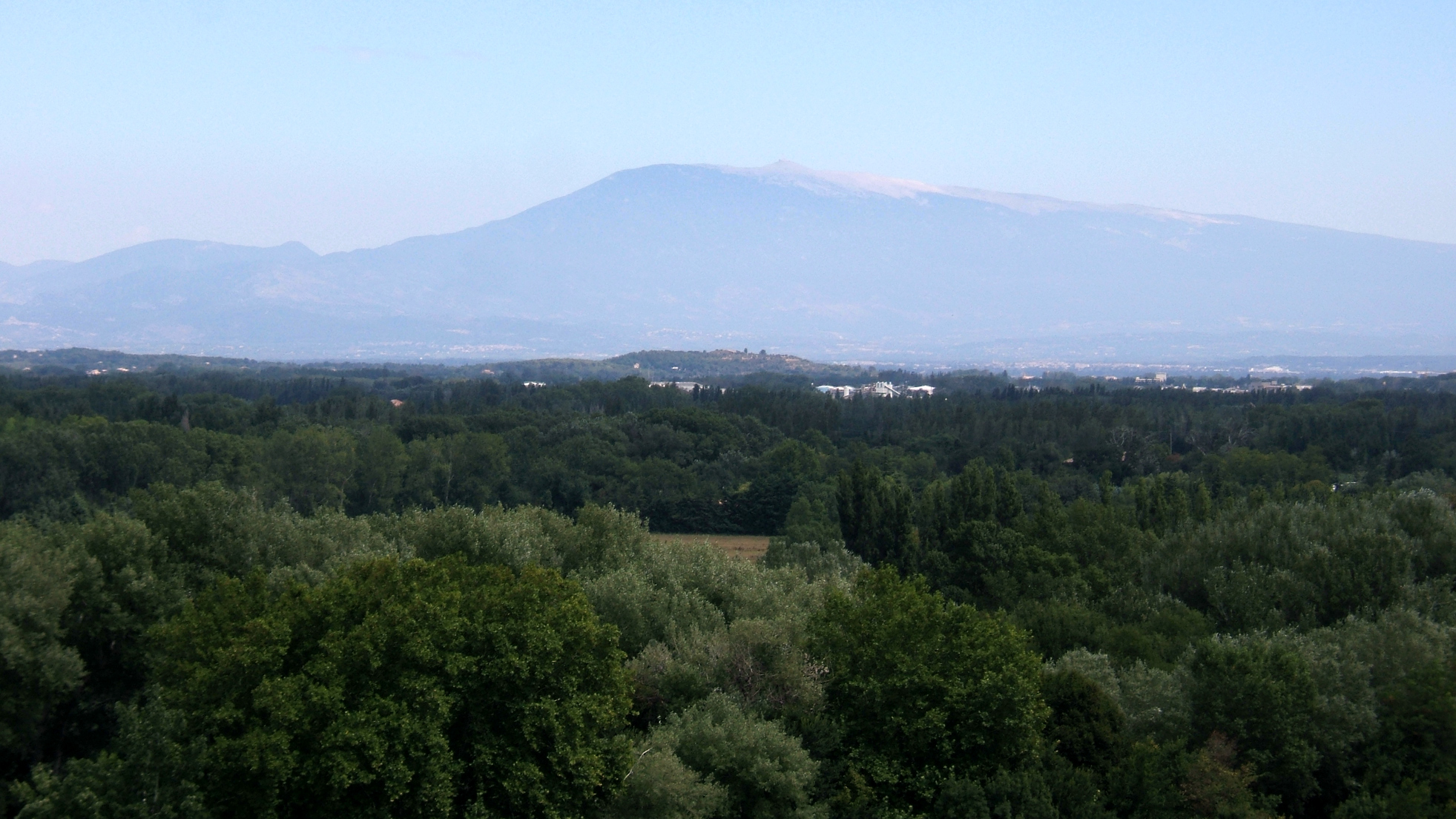
Mont Ventoux as seen from Avignon, around 50 km (30 miles) away.

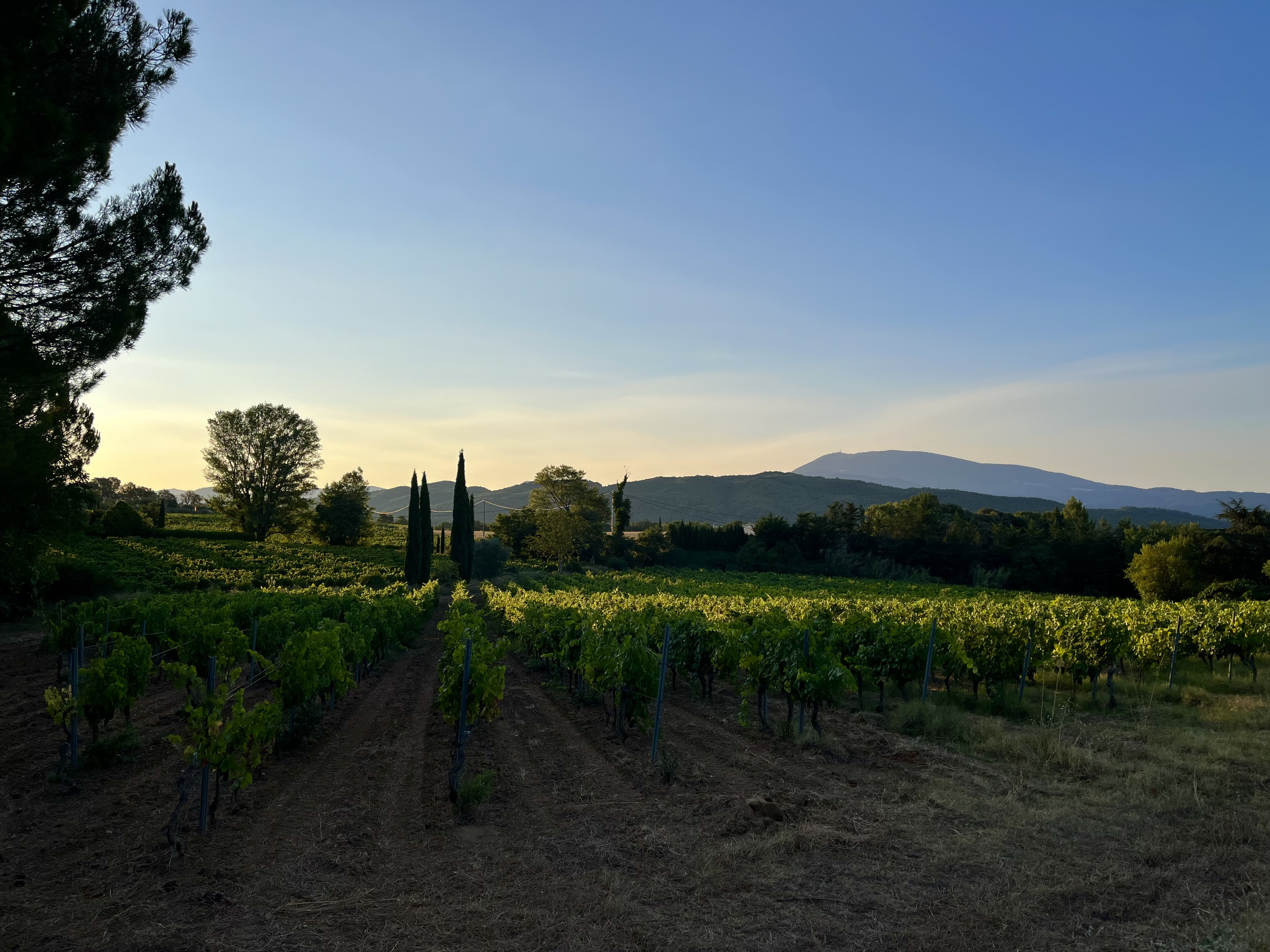
Mont Ventoux from Vaison-la-Romaine

Humans have probably scaled Mount Ventoux since prehistory. The first recorded ascent was by the influential 14th‑century French scholastic philosopher Jean Buridan who is recorded climbing Mont Ventoux before 1334 while on his way to the papal court in Avignon "in order to make some meteorological observations". The Italian poet Petrarch wrote a possibly fictional account of an ascent accompanied by his brother on 26 April 1336, in his Ascent of Mont Ventoux.

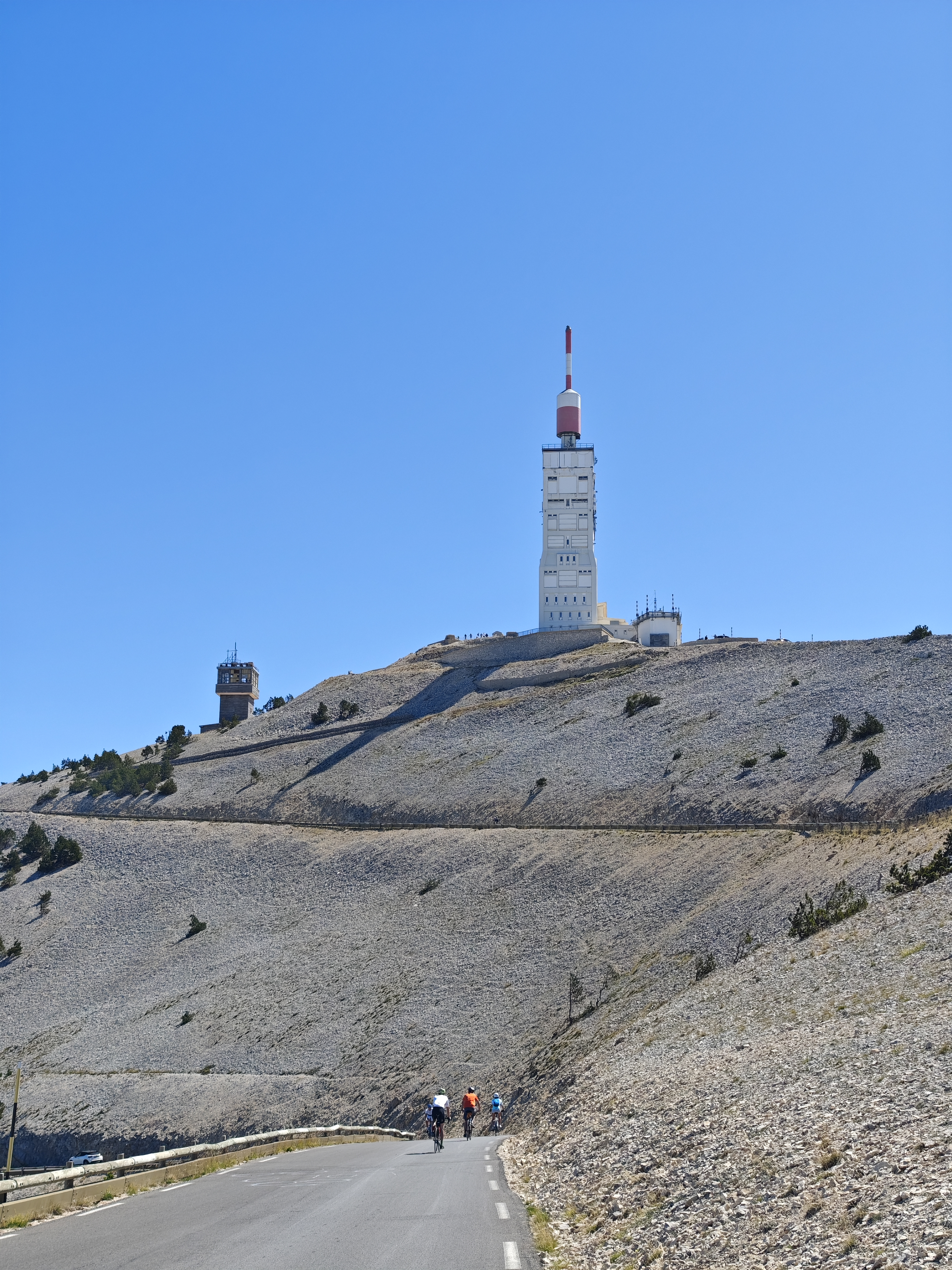
Cyclists on the road to Mont Ventoux

In the 15th century, a chapel was constructed on the top and dedicated to the Holy Cross.

In 1882, a meteorological station was constructed on the summit, but it is no longer in use. This observatory had been planned in 1879, along with a carriage road for access.

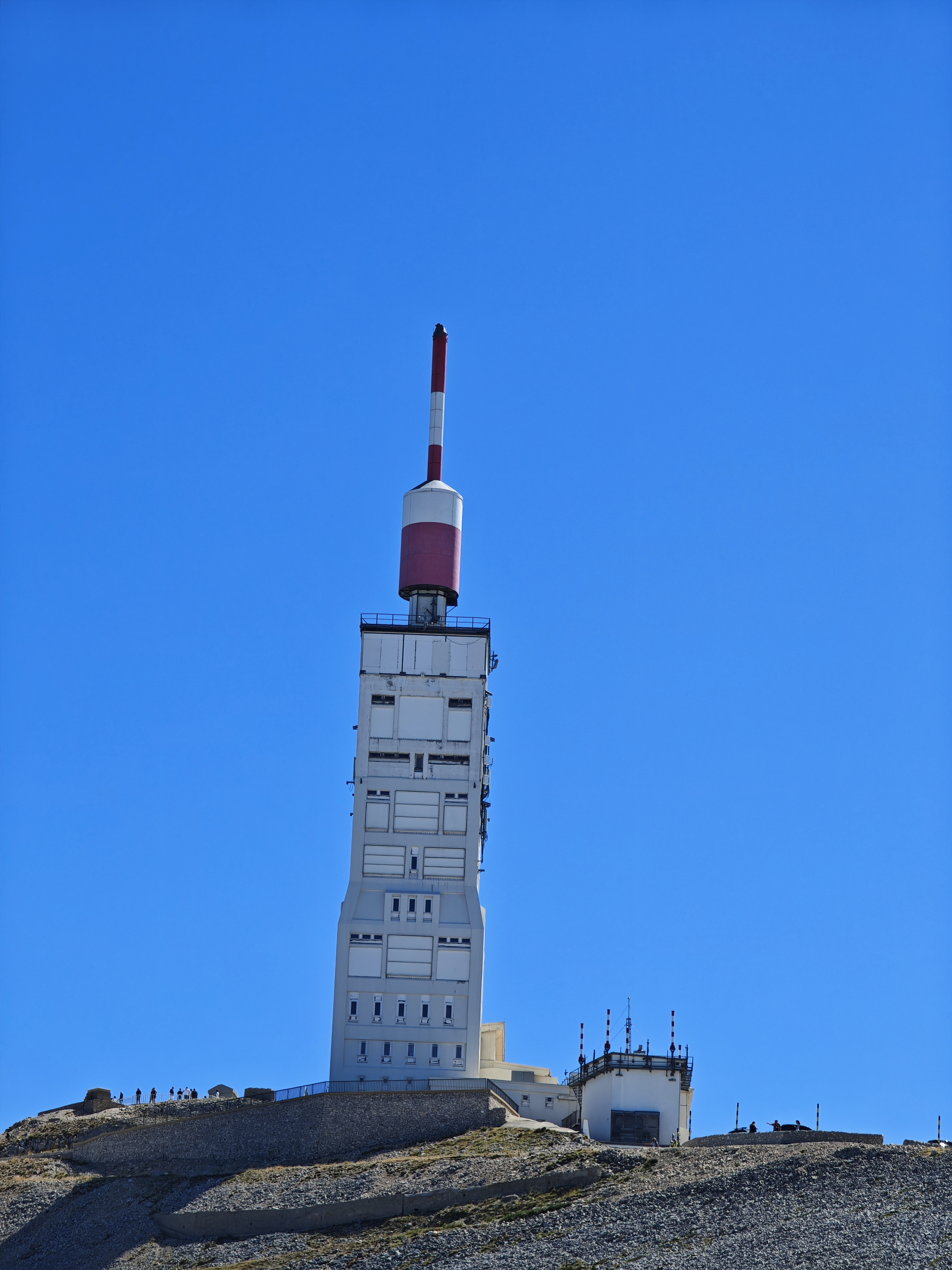
Summit communications tower on Mont Ventoux

In the 1960s, a 50-metre-tall (160 ft) telecommunications mast was built.

From 1902 to 1976, the Mont Ventoux Hill Climb for car and motorcycle took place on the roads of the Mont.

== Flora and fauna ==
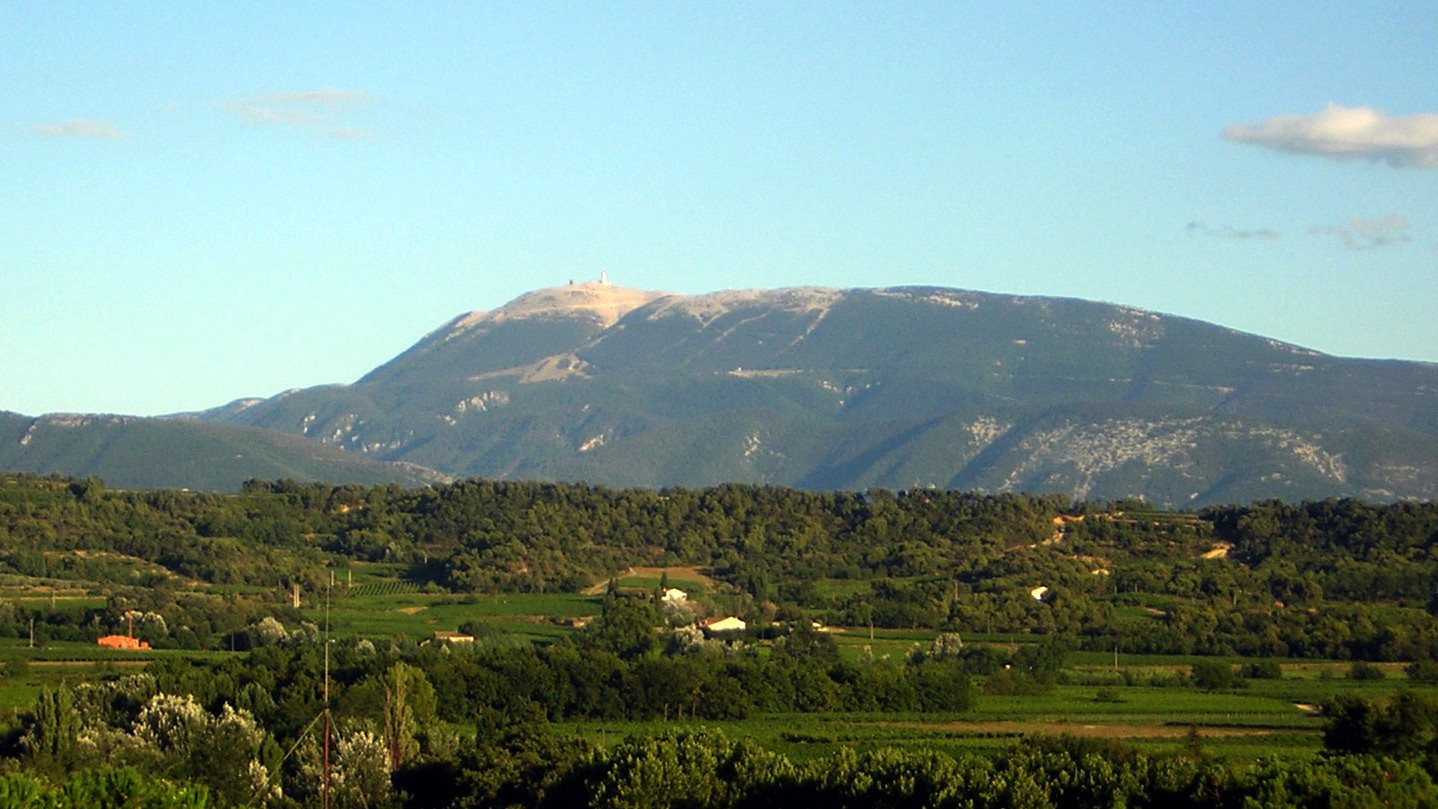
View of Mont Ventoux from Mirabel-aux-Baronnies

Originally forested, Mont Ventoux was systematically stripped of trees from the 12th century onwards to serve the demands of the shipbuilders of the naval port of Toulon. Some areas have been reforested since 1860 with a variety of hardwood trees (such as holm oaks and beeches) as well as coniferous species, such as Atlas cedars and larches. A little higher, junipers are common.

The mountain comprises the species boundary or ecotone between the flora and fauna of northern and southern France. Some species, including various types of spiders and butterflies, are unique to Mont Ventoux. It is a good place to spot the short-toed snake eagle (Circaetus gallicus).

Its biological distinctiveness was recognised by UNESCO in 1990 when the Réserve de Biosphère du Mont Ventoux was created, protecting an area of 810 square kilometres (200,150 acres) on and around the mountain.

== Climate ==
Climate data for Beaumont du Ventoux (Mont Serein), 1445m (1991−2020 normals)
Month	Jan	Feb	Mar	Apr	May	Jun	Jul	Aug	Sep	Oct	Nov	Dec	Year
Record high °C (°F)	12.7 (54.9)	14.7 (58.5)	17.0 (62.6)	20.0 (68.0)	26.9 (80.4)	33.4 (92.1)	30.0 (86.0)	32.1 (89.8)	24.7 (76.5)	19.6 (67.3)	16.1 (61.0)	14.0 (57.2)	33.4 (92.1)
Mean daily maximum °C (°F)	1.2 (34.2)	1.6 (34.9)	5.2 (41.4)	8.2 (46.8)	13.2 (55.8)	17.7 (63.9)	20.7 (69.3)	20.5 (68.9)	14.6 (58.3)	9.9 (49.8)	4.6 (40.3)	2.0 (35.6)	10.0 (49.9)
Daily mean °C (°F)	−0.7 (30.7)	−0.7 (30.7)	2.3 (36.1)	4.9 (40.8)	9.6 (49.3)	13.7 (56.7)	16.4 (61.5)	16.4 (61.5)	11.3 (52.3)	7.5 (45.5)	2.7 (36.9)	0.1 (32.2)	7.0 (44.5)
Mean daily minimum °C (°F)	−2.6 (27.3)	−3.1 (26.4)	−0.6 (30.9)	1.7 (35.1)	6.1 (43.0)	9.7 (49.5)	12.0 (53.6)	12.3 (54.1)	8.0 (46.4)	5.2 (41.4)	0.8 (33.4)	−1.8 (28.8)	4.0 (39.2)
Record low °C (°F)	−15 (5)	−18 (0)	−13 (9)	−9 (16)	−4.7 (23.5)	−0.5 (31.1)	1.5 (34.7)	3.2 (37.8)	−1.8 (28.8)	−8 (18)	−11 (12)	−14.9 (5.2)	−18 (0)
Average precipitation mm (inches)	130.9 (5.15)	84.9 (3.34)	82.5 (3.25)	125.7 (4.95)	112.3 (4.42)	76.4 (3.01)	43.7 (1.72)	59.5 (2.34)	138.8 (5.46)	169.2 (6.66)	177.2 (6.98)	115.9 (4.56)	1,317 (51.84)
Average precipitation days (≥ 1.0 mm)	8.8	7.2	7.5	9.4	8.9	6.0	4.3	4.6	6.9	8.8	10.3	8.9	91.6
Source: Météo-France

== Road cycling ==
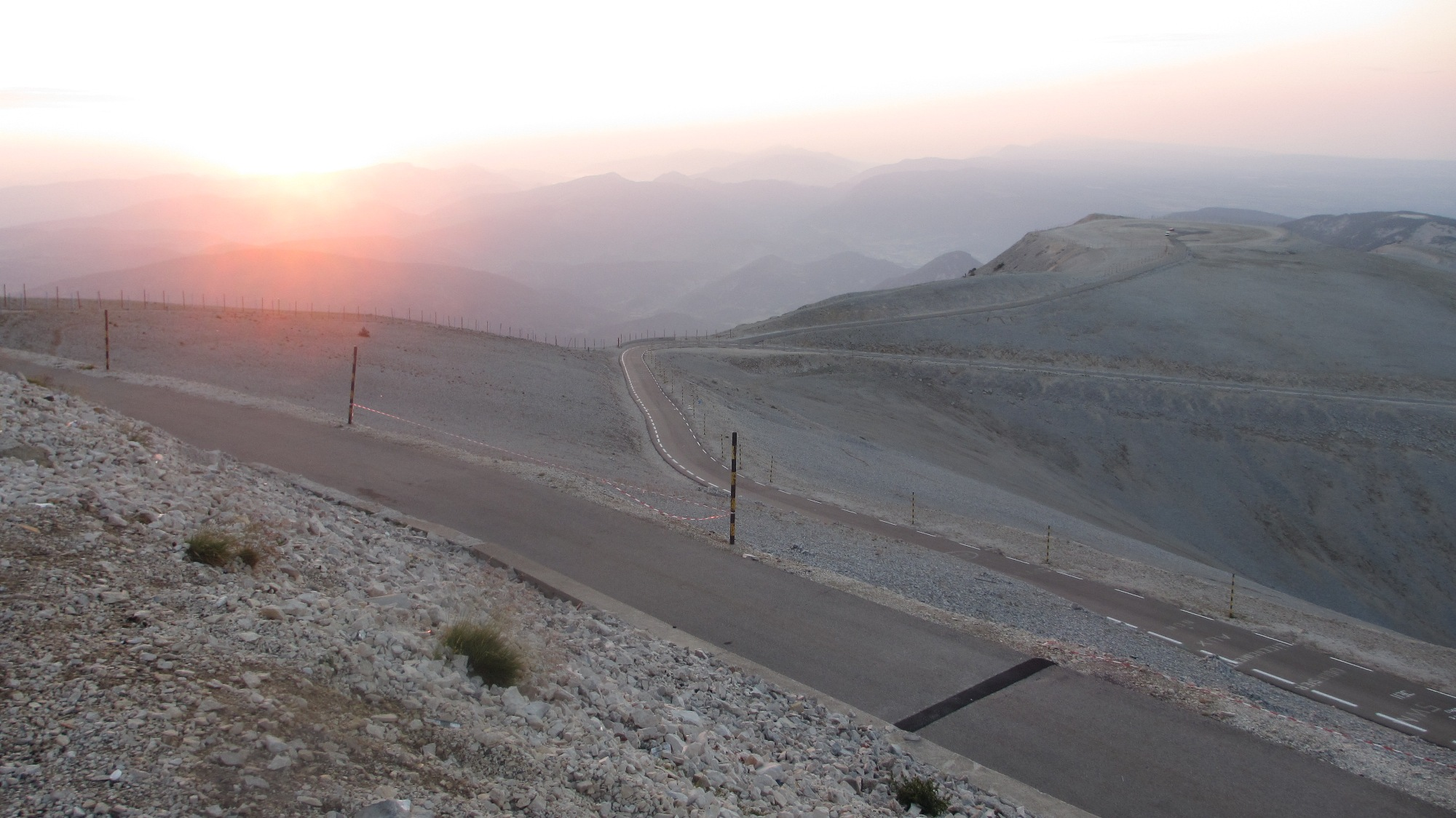
The view from the summit of Mont Ventoux at dawn

In road bicycle racing, the mountain can be climbed by three routes.

- From the South: climb starts in Bédoin: 1,617 m (5,305 ft) over 21.8 km (13.5 mi). This is regarded as the most difficult ascent, and is ranked by PJAMM Cycling as the 3rd most difficult bike climb in France. The road to the summit has an average gradient of 7.43%. Until Saint-Estève, the climb is 3.9% over 5.8 km (3.6 mi), but the remaining 16 km (9.9 mi) has an average gradient of 8.9%. To serve as a comparison the climb of Alpe d'Huez is about 13.8 km (8.6 mi) at an average gradient of 7.9%. The last kilometres may have strong, violent winds. The ride takes 1 1/2 to 2 1/2 hours for trained amateur riders. Professional riders take 60 to 75 minutes. The fastest time so far recorded has been that of Tadej Pogacar in Stage 16 of the 2025 Tour de France: 53min 47s. The time was measured from Bédoin for the first time in the 1958 Tour de France, in which Charly Gaul was the fastest at 62 min 9 s.
- From the Northwest: climb starts in Malaucène: 1,570 m (5,150 ft) over 21.5 km (13.4 mi). About equal in difficulty as the Bédoin ascent, but better sheltered against the wind.
- From the East: climb starts in Sault: 1,210 m (3,970 ft) over 26 km (16 mi). The easiest route. After Chalet Reynard (where the "lunar landscape" of the summit starts), the climb is the same as the Bédoin ascent. Average gradient of 4.4%.

Every year there are amateur races to climb the mountain as quickly and often as possible in 24 hours, the Ventoux Masterseries and "Les Cinglés du Mont Ventoux". Cyclists can become a member of the Cinglés du Mont Ventoux Club by ascending all 3 sides of the mountain in a single day. Within this club there are other even more difficult challenges such as the Galériens which is 4 ascents in 24 hours of Ventoux including a forest path as the 4th ascent, the Bicinglés which is 6 ascents, all 3 sides twice in 24 hours and is 8800m of elevation which is roughly equivalent to the elevation of Mount Everest. Beyond this there are unofficial and extremely challenging variants such as the Tricinglés which is an extension of the bicinglés and is all 3 sides three times in 24 hours, total of 9 ascents of Ventoux in a single day. On 16 May 2006, Jean-Pascal Roux from Bédoin broke the record of climbs in 24 hours, with eleven climbs, all of them from Bédoin.

=== Tour de France ===
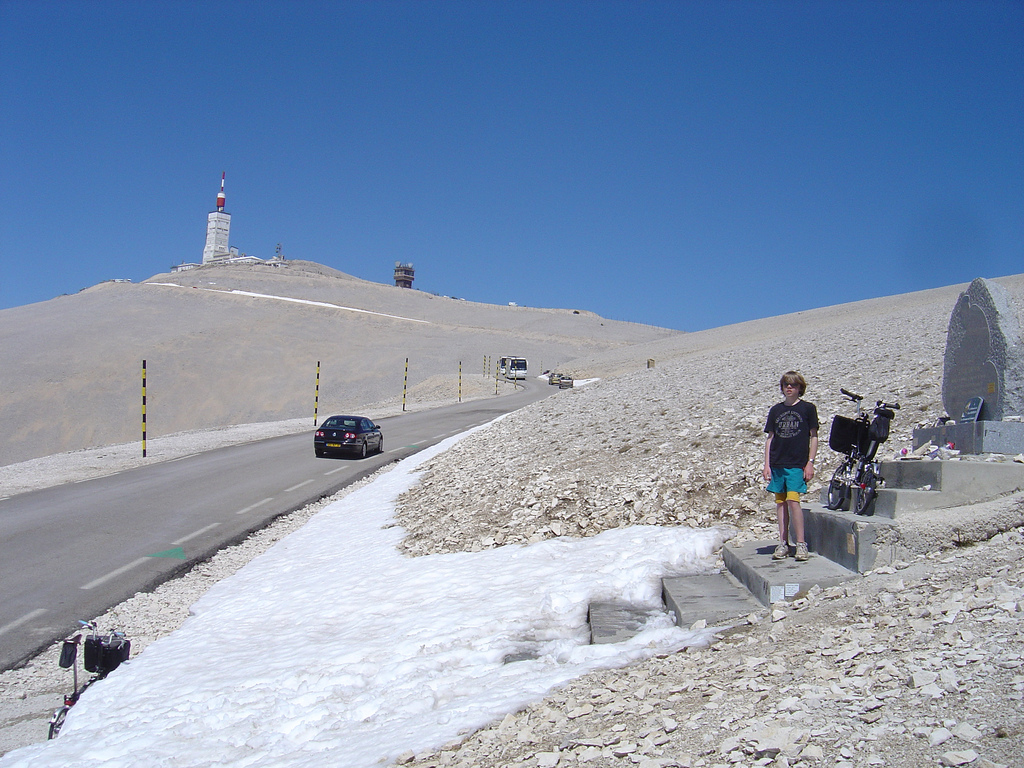
Memorial of Tom Simpson, who died near the summit during the 1967 Tour de France, aged 29.

Mont Ventoux is the scene of one of the most difficult climbs in the Tour de France bicycle race, which has ascended the mountain eighteen times since 1951. The followed trail mostly passes through Bédoin. Its fame as a scene of great Tour dramas has made it popular among cyclists around the world.

British cyclist Tom Simpson died on the mountain on 13 July 1967 from heat exhaustion caused by a combination of factors, including dehydration (caused by lack of fluid intake and diarrhœa), use of amphetamines, and alcohol, although there is still speculation as to the exact cause of his death. He began to wildly weave across the road before he fell down. He was delirious and asked spectators to put him back on the bike, which he rode to within a kilometre of the summit before collapsing dead, still clipped into his pedals. Amphetamines were found in his jersey and bloodstream. There is a memorial to Simpson near the summit, which has become a shrine to fans of cycling, who often leave small tokens of remembrance there. In 1970, Eddy Merckx rode himself to the brink of collapse while winning the stage. He received oxygen, recovered, and won the Tour. In 1994, Eros Poli, not known for his climbing ability, stole away at the beginning of the day's stage, built up a substantial time gap from the peloton, and was first over the Ventoux and eventual stage winner despite losing a minute of his lead per kilometre of the ascent.

==== Tour de France stage finishes ====
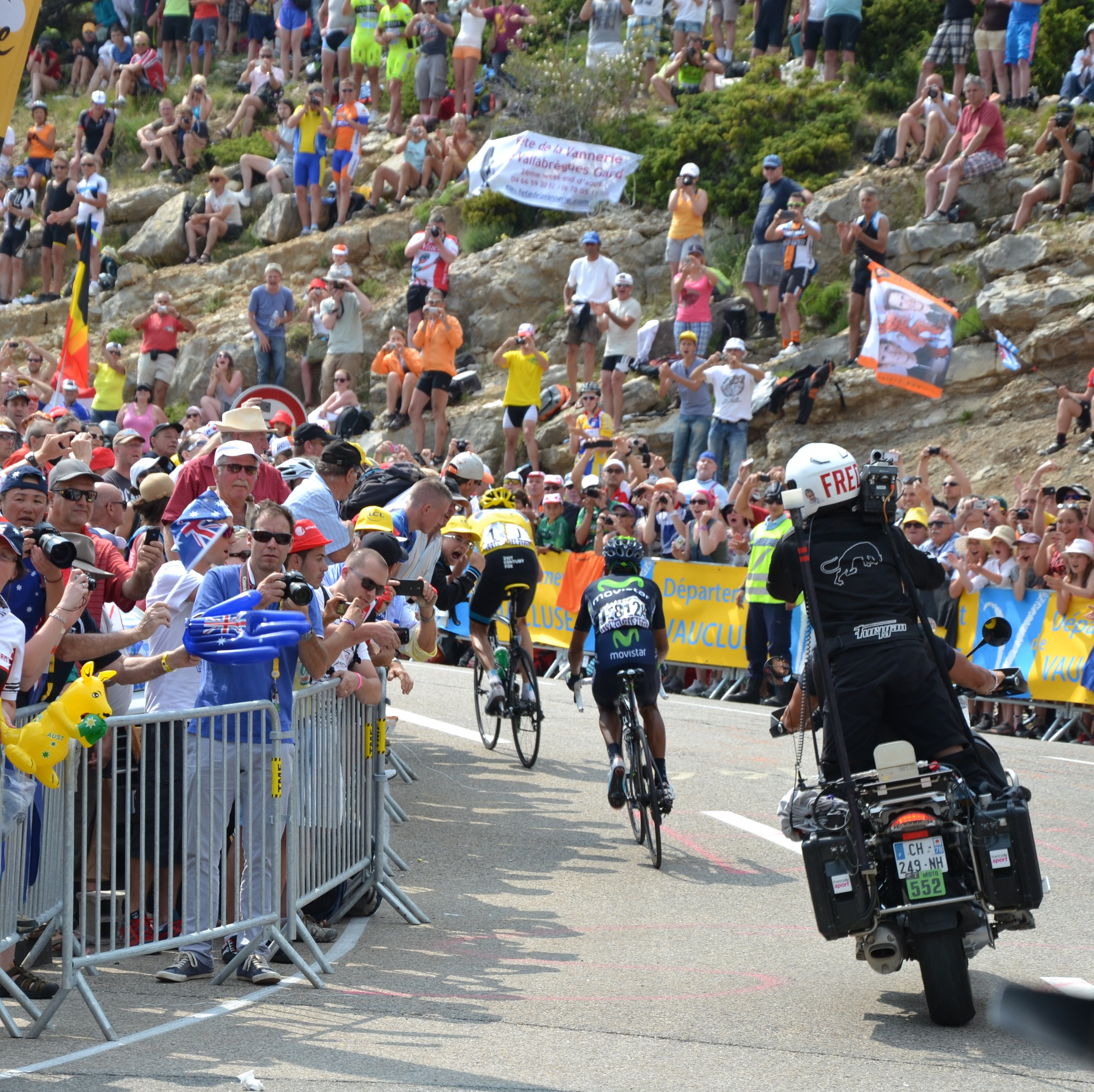
Chris Froome and Nairo Quintana climbing Mont Ventoux at the 2013 Tour de France

The race has finished at the summit of Mont Ventoux ten times. The finish line is at 1,910 m (6,270 ft), although in 1965, 1967, 1972 and 1974 the finish was lower, at 1,895 m (6,217 ft).

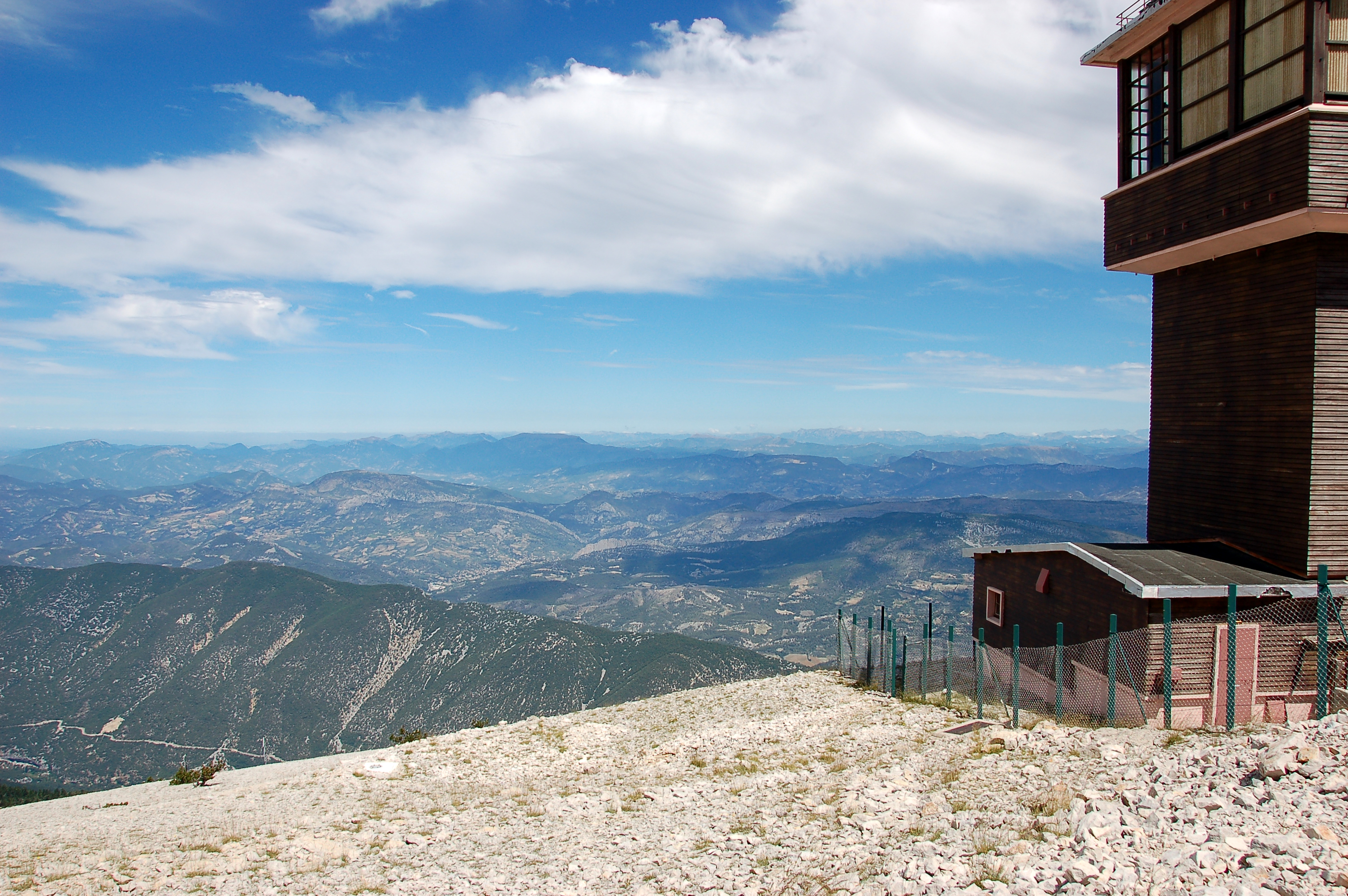
Summit of Mont Ventoux

Three riders have won on top of the mountain, and gone on to win the Tour; Charly Gaul in 1958, Eddy Merckx in 1970 and Chris Froome in 2013. Both Merckx and Froome won while wearing the yellow jersey, maintaining the overall lead until Paris. Gaul was not in yellow when he won on the Ventoux, nor did he immediately gain the maillot jaune following the victory, Gaul only taking the overall lead of the tour several stages later.

In September 2008, it was announced by Claude Haut, the president of the Vaucluse province, that in 2009 the Tour de France would visit Mont Ventoux after a seven-year absence. Unusually, the riders climbed the mountain on the second-to-last day of the race, on 25 July 2009, prior to transferring to Paris for the traditional parade on the Champs-Élysées. It was next featured in the 100th Tour de France in 2013 on Stage 15.

In 2016, the stage to Mont Ventoux was shortened by 6 km (3.7 mi) the day before, after a weather forecast of high winds at the summit. The stage then finished at Chalet Reynard at 1,435 m (4,708 ft), with approximately 10 km (6 mi) of ascent up the mountain. This stage also featured a motorcycle-induced crash which damaged Chris Froome's bike, prompting him to jog some 100 metres up the mountain until he was able to get a neutral service bike (as his team car was too far back at the time), which did not fit him properly.

Stage 16 of the 2025 Tour de France ended at the summit of Mont Ventoux and was won by Frenchman Valentin Paret-Peintre.

Tour de France stages with summit finishes on Mont Ventoux
Year	Stage	Start of stage	Distance (km)	Category	Stage winner	General classification leader	Tour de France winner
1958	18	Bédoin	21.5 (ITT)	1	Charly Gaul (LUX)	Raphaël Géminiani (FRA)	Charly Gaul (LUX)
1965	14	Montpellier	173	1	Raymond Poulidor (FRA)	Felice Gimondi (ITA)	Felice Gimondi (ITA)
1970	14	Gap	170	1	Eddy Merckx (BEL)	Eddy Merckx (BEL)	Eddy Merckx (BEL)
1972	11	Carnon-Plage	207	1	Bernard Thévenet (FRA)	Eddy Merckx (BEL)	Eddy Merckx (BEL)
1987	18	Carpentras	36.5 (ITT)	HC	Jean-François Bernard (FRA)	Jean-François Bernard (FRA)	Stephen Roche (IRL)
2000	12	Carpentras	149	HC	Marco Pantani (ITA)	Lance Armstrong (USA)	~~Lance Armstrong~~ (USA)
2002	14	Lodève	221	HC	Richard Virenque (FRA)	Lance Armstrong (USA)	~~Lance Armstrong~~ (USA)
2009	20	Montélimar	167	HC	Juan Manuel Gárate (ESP)	Alberto Contador (ESP)	Alberto Contador (ESP)
2013	15	Givors	242.5	HC	Chris Froome (GBR)	Chris Froome (GBR)	Chris Froome (GBR)
2016	12	Montpellier	178	HC	Thomas De Gendt (BEL)	Chris Froome (GBR)	Chris Froome (GBR)
2025	16	Montpellier	171.5	HC	Valentin Paret-Peintre (FRA)	Tadej Pogačar (SLO)	Tadej Pogačar (SLO)

Note: As a result of an investigation into doping in 2012 Lance Armstrong was stripped of his Tour de France titles between 1999 and 2005 by the UCI. As such the tours for those years have no winner.

==== Other appearances in the Tour ====
The race has also crossed the summit eight times.

Year	Stage	Category	Start	Finish	Leader at the summit
1951	18	1	Montpellier	Avignon	Lucien Lazaridès (FRA)
1952	14	1	Aix-en-Provence	Avignon	Jean Robic (FRA)
1955	11	1	Marseille	Avignon	Louison Bobet (FRA)
1967	13	1	Marseille	Carpentras	Julio Jiménez (ESP)
1974	12	1	Savines-le-Lac	Orange	Gonzalo Aja (ESP)
1994	15	HC	Montpellier	Carpentras	Eros Poli (ITA)
2021	11	1	Sorgues	Malaucène	Julian Alaphilippe (FRA)
2021	11	HC	Sorgues	Malaucène	Wout Van Aert (BEL)

In 1951, the approach to the summit was from Malaucène. In 2021, the first ascent was from Sault, whilst the second was from Bédoin. In all other years, the approach has been from Bédoin.

=== Tour de France Femmes ===
Stage 7 of the 2026 Tour de France Femmes ended at the summit of Mont Ventoux, taking the route through Bédoin. The stage was won by Katarzyna Niewiadoma-Phinney, taking the Yellow Jersey.

Year	Stage	Start of stage	Distance (km)	Category	Stage winner	Yellow Jersey
2026	7	La Voulte-sur-Rhône	146.8	HC	Katarzyna Niewiadoma-Phinney (POL)	Katarzyna Niewiadoma-Phinney (POL)

=== Climb from Bédoin ===
The climb by bike from Bédoin to Mont Ventoux is one of the toughest in professional cycling. The figure for the average gradients per kilometre can be found in many books and websites on cycling. The average gradient of the total climb and also the average gradients per kilometre differ slightly, depending on the source of the information. Accurate measurements result in an average gradient for the total climb of 7.43%, based on a horizontal distance of 21.765 km (13.524 mi) and an ascent of 1,617 m (5,305 ft). The actual distance ridden is 21.825 km (13.561 mi).

The average gradients in each kilometre are as follows:

Kilometre	Average gradient	Kilometre	Average gradient
1	1.9%	12	10.1%
2	2.8%	13	9.2%
3	3.8%	14	9.4%
4	5.8%	15	8.8%
5	5.6%	16	6.9%
6	3.1%	17	6.6%
7	8.6%	18	6.8%
8	9.4%	19	7.4%
9	10.5%	20	8.3%
10	10.1%	21	9.1%
11	9.3%	22	10.0%

=== Transcontinental Race ===
Mont Ventoux was used as the first checkpoint in the 2015 Transcontinental Race, which is a non-stop, unsupported bicycle race across Europe.

== Skiing ==
There are two small ski stations on the mountain: "Mont Serein" on the north side, and "Chalet Reynard" on the south. High winds and the modest elevation tend to limit the ski season. Weather conditions are such that the northern slope is often icy, leading to a saying among people of the surrounding region regarding the challenges of skiing the mountain: Qui skie au Ventoux, skie partout (If you can ski Ventoux, you can ski anywhere).

== See also ==
- List of highest paved roads in Europe
- List of mountain passes
